= 1989–90 Los Angeles Kings season =

National Hockey League team season

1989–90 Los Angeles Kings
- Division: 4th Smythe
- Conference: 8th Campbell
- 1989–90 record: 34–39–7
- Home record: 21–16–3
- Road record: 13–23–4
- Goals for: 338
- Goals against: 337

Team information
- General manager: Rogatien Vachon
- Coach: Tom Webster
- Captain: Wayne Gretzky
- Alternate captains: Larry Robinson; Dave Taylor
- Arena: Great Western Forum

Team leaders
- Goals: Luc Robitaille (52)
- Assists: Wayne Gretzky (102)
- Points: Wayne Gretzky (142)
- Penalty minutes: Marty McSorley (322)
- Plus/minus: Tim Watters (+23)
- Wins: Kelly Hrudey (22)
- Goals against average: Ron Scott (3.67)

The 1989–90 Los Angeles Kings season was the Kings' 23rd season in the National Hockey League (NHL). It saw the Kings compile a record of 34-39-7 for 75 points, good enough for fourth place in the Smythe Division. They defeated the defending Stanley Cup champion Calgary Flames in the first round of the playoffs before falling to the eventual Stanley Cup champion Edmonton Oilers in the second round. For the Kings, this was the second consecutive year that they eliminated the defending Stanley Cup champions in the first round of the playoffs, only to be swept in the following round by the eventual Cup champions. In both years, they involved both teams from the province of Alberta.

This season saw the Kings' captain, Wayne Gretzky, become the all-time leading scorer in NHL history (see below for more details). Gretzky also led the league in scoring for the year, winning the Art Ross Trophy.

== Offseason ==
=== NHL draft ===
Los Angeles's draft picks at the 1989 NHL entry draft held at the Met Center in Bloomington, Minnesota.

Round	#	Player	Nationality	College/Junior/Club team (League)
2	39	Brent Thompson	Canada	Medicine Hat Tigers (WHL)
4	81	Jim Maher	United States	University of Illinois at Chicago (CCHA)
5	102	Eric Richard	Canada	Granby Bisons (QMJHL)
5	103	Tom Newman	United States	Blaine High School (USHS-MN)
6	123	Daniel Rydmark	Sweden	Farjestad BK (Sweden)
7	144	Ted Kramer	United States	University of Michigan (CCHA)
8	165	Sean Whyte	Canada	Guelph Platers (OHL)
9	182	Jim Giacin	United States	Culver Military Academy (USHS-IN)
9	186	Martin Maskarinec	Czechoslovakia	Sparta Prague (Czechoslovakia)
10	207	Jim Hiller	Canada	Melville Millionaires (SJHL)
11	228	Steve Jaques	Canada	Tri-City Americans (WHL)
12	249	Kevin Sneddon	Canada	Harvard University (ECAC)
S	23	Carl Repp	Canada	University of British Columbia (CWUAA)

== Regular season ==
Mario Gosselin was the first goaltender in NHL history to lose a game without giving up a goal. Gosselin filled in for Kelly Hrudey and the Kings would give up an empty net goal. The result was a 7-6 loss to the Edmonton Oilers.

On Wednesday, October 25, 1989, the Kings were shut out at home 5-0 by the Calgary Flames. It was the first time the team had been shut out in a regular-season game since Wednesday, March 12, 1986, when they lost at home 3-0 to the Detroit Red Wings. Prior to the loss against the Flames, the Kings had scored at least one goal in 261 consecutive regular-season games.

=== Wayne Gretzky's scoring record ===
On October 15, 1989, playing in only his 780th career game, Wayne Gretzky became the all-time leading scorer in NHL history, breaking the record of 1,850 career points set by his idol, Gordie Howe. Gretzky set the new record on a game-tying goal against Bill Ranford in the final minute of a contest against his former team, the Edmonton Oilers, in Edmonton. Afterwards, Howe was on hand to congratulate Gretzky on his accomplishment. The Kings went on to win the game in overtime.

=== Final standings ===
Smythe Division
	GP	W	L	T	GF	GA	Pts
**Calgary Flames**	80	42	23	15	348	265	99
**Edmonton Oilers**	80	38	28	14	315	283	90
**Winnipeg Jets**	80	37	32	11	298	290	85
**Los Angeles Kings**	80	34	39	7	338	337	75
Vancouver Canucks	80	25	41	14	245	306	64

Note: GP = Games played, W = Wins, L = Losses, T = Ties, Pts = Points, GF = Goals for, GA = Goals against
Note: Teams that qualified for the playoffs are highlighted in bold.

Campbell Conference
R		Div	GP	W	L	T	GF	GA	Pts
**1**	**Calgary Flames**	**SMY**	**80**	**42**	**23**	**15**	**348**	**265**	**99**
**2**	**Edmonton Oilers**	**SMY**	**80**	**38**	**28**	**14**	**315**	**283**	**90**
**3**	**Chicago Blackhawks**	**NRS**	**80**	**41**	**33**	**6**	**316**	**294**	**88**
**4**	**Winnipeg Jets**	**SMY**	**80**	**37**	**32**	**11**	**298**	**290**	**85**
**5**	**St. Louis Blues**	**NRS**	**80**	**37**	**34**	**9**	**295**	**279**	**83**
**6**	**Toronto Maple Leafs**	**NRS**	**80**	**38**	**38**	**4**	**337**	**358**	**80**
**7**	**Minnesota North Stars**	**NRS**	**80**	**36**	**40**	**4**	**284**	**291**	**76**
**8**	**Los Angeles Kings**	**SMY**	**80**	**34**	**39**	**7**	**338**	**337**	**75**
9	Detroit Red Wings	NRS	80	28	38	14	288	323	70
10	Vancouver Canucks	SMY	80	25	41	14	245	306	64

Divisions: NRS – Norris, SMY – Smythe

bold – Qualified for playoffs

=== Record vs. opponents ===
==== Vs. Campbell Conference ====
Vs. Smythe Division

1989–90 NHL records
Team	CGY	EDM	LAK	VAN	WIN	Total
Calgary	—	4–3–1	4–3–1	5–1–2	3–5	**16–12–4**
Edmonton	3–4–1	—	4–2–2	6–1–1	5–3	**18–10–4**
Los Angeles	3–4–1	2–4–2	—	4–2–2	2–5–1	**11–15–6**
Vancouver	1–5–2	1–6–1	2–4–2	—	2–3–3	**6–18–8**
Winnipeg	5–3	3–5	5–2–1	3–3–2	—	**16–13–3**

Vs. Norris Division

1989–90 NHL records
Team	CHI	DET	MIN	STL	TOR	Total
Calgary	2–0–1	1–2	2–1	2–0–1	2–1	**9–4–2**
Edmonton	1–2	1–2	3–0	2–0–1	1–2	**8–6–1**
Los Angeles	1–2	2–1	1–2	2–1	1–2	**7–8–0**
Vancouver	1–2	1–1–1	2–1	1–2	1–2	**6–8–1**
Winnipeg	1–2	1–1–1	1–2	1–1–1	2–0–1	**6–6–3**

Vs. Wales Conference

Vs. Adams Division

1989–90 NHL records
Team	BOS	BUF	HFD	MTL	QUE	Total
Calgary	1–1–1	1–1–1	2–0–1	1–2	1–0–2	**6–4–5**
Edmonton	0–2–1	2–1	0–1–2	1–1–1	3–0	**6–5–4**
Los Angeles	1–2	1–2	1–2	1–1–1	3–0	**7–7–1**
Vancouver	2–1	0–2–1	1–2	1–2	0–2–1	**4–9–2**
Winnipeg	1–1–1	0–3	2–1	1–1–1	2–1	**6–7–2**

Vs. Patrick Division

1989–90 NHL records
Team	NJD	NYI	NYR	PHI	PIT	WSH	Total
Calgary	3–0	3–0	2–1	1–1–1	2–0–1	0–1–2	**11–3–4**
Edmonton	0–1–2	1–0–2	0–2–1	2–1	1–2	2–1	**6–7–5**
Los Angeles	1–2	1–2	2–1	0–3	2–1	3–0	**9–9–0**
Vancouver	3–0	1–2	0–3	1–0–2	2–1	2–0–1	**9–6–3**
Winnipeg	2–1	1–2	1–1–1	2–1	0–2–1	3–0	**9–7–2**

== Schedule and results ==
1989–90 regular season
October

Game	Result	Date	Score	Opponent	Record
1	W	October 5, 1989	4–2	Toronto Maple Leafs (1989–90)	1–0–0
2	L	October 7, 1989	5–6	Edmonton Oilers (1989–90)	1–1–0
3	W	October 8, 1989	5–0	Detroit Red Wings (1989–90)	2–1–0
4	L	October 11, 1989	4–7	New York Islanders (1989–90)	2–2–0
5	W	October 13, 1989	6–5	@ Vancouver Canucks (1989–90)	3–2–0
6	W	October 15, 1989	5–4 OT	@ Edmonton Oilers (1989–90)	4–2–0
7	L	October 17, 1989	2–3	Boston Bruins (1989–90)	4–3–0
8	W	October 21, 1989	6–4	@ St. Louis Blues (1989–90)	5–3–0
9	L	October 22, 1989	4–7	@ Chicago Blackhawks (1989–90)	5–4–0
10	L	October 25, 1989	0–5	Calgary Flames (1989–90)	5–5–0
11	W	October 27, 1989	3–1	@ Winnipeg Jets (1989–90)	6–5–0
12	L	October 29, 1989	1–6	@ Winnipeg Jets (1989–90)	6–6–0
13	W	October 31, 1989	8–4	@ Pittsburgh Penguins (1989–90)	7–6–0

November

Game	Result	Date	Score	Opponent	Record
14	L	November 2, 1989	4–5 OT	@ Boston Bruins (1989–90)	7–7–0
15	L	November 4, 1989	3–6	@ Hartford Whalers (1989–90)	7–8–0
16	L	November 5, 1989	3–5	@ Buffalo Sabres (1989–90)	7–9–0
17	L	November 8, 1989	4–5	Calgary Flames (1989–90)	7–10–0
18	W	November 11, 1989	5–4	Montreal Canadiens (1989–90)	8–10–0
19	W	November 14, 1989	8–6	@ Calgary Flames (1989–90)	9–10–0
20	T	November 15, 1989	2–2 OT	@ Edmonton Oilers (1989–90)	9–10–1
21	W	November 18, 1989	5–3	Washington Capitals (1989–90)	10–10–1
22	W	November 22, 1989	6–3	Chicago Blackhawks (1989–90)	11–10–1
23	W	November 25, 1989	7–4	Vancouver Canucks (1989–90)	12–10–1
24	T	November 26, 1989	3–3 OT	@ Vancouver Canucks (1989–90)	12–10–2
25	L	November 30, 1989	6–7	Edmonton Oilers (1989–90)	12–11–2

December

Game	Result	Date	Score	Opponent	Record
26	W	December 2, 1989	6–0	New York Rangers (1989–90)	13–11–2
27	W	December 6, 1989	5–4 OT	Vancouver Canucks (1989–90)	14–11–2
28	L	December 8, 1989	4–5 OT	@ Edmonton Oilers (1989–90)	14–12–2
29	W	December 10, 1989	8–4	@ Quebec Nordiques (1989–90)	15–12–2
30	T	December 11, 1989	2–2 OT	@ Montreal Canadiens (1989–90)	15–12–3
31	W	December 13, 1989	5–2	@ Hartford Whalers (1989–90)	16–12–3
32	L	December 15, 1989	5–7	@ New Jersey Devils (1989–90)	16–13–3
33	L	December 16, 1989	2–5	@ Philadelphia Flyers (1989–90)	16–14–3
34	W	December 19, 1989	9–5	Winnipeg Jets (1989–90)	17–14–3
35	W	December 21, 1989	6–1	Quebec Nordiques (1989–90)	18–14–3
36	W	December 23, 1989	4–1	Vancouver Canucks (1989–90)	19–14–3
37	T	December 27, 1989	5–5 OT	Calgary Flames (1989–90)	19–14–4
38	L	December 30, 1989	3–6	Philadelphia Flyers (1989–90)	19–15–4

January

Game	Result	Date	Score	Opponent	Record
39	W	January 1, 1990	7–4	@ Washington Capitals (1989–90)	20–15–4
40	L	January 2, 1990	3–5	@ New York Islanders (1989–90)	20–16–4
41	L	January 4, 1990	2–4	@ New Jersey Devils (1989–90)	20–17–4
42	L	January 6, 1990	4–7	@ Toronto Maple Leafs (1989–90)	20–18–4
43	L	January 9, 1990	3–4	St. Louis Blues (1989–90)	20–19–4
44	T	January 11, 1990	3–3 OT	Edmonton Oilers (1989–90)	20–19–5
45	L	January 13, 1990	3–6	Hartford Whalers (1989–90)	20–20–5
46	L	January 16, 1990	2–4	Buffalo Sabres (1989–90)	20–21–5
47	W	January 18, 1990	9–4	Detroit Red Wings (1989–90)	21–21–5
48	T	January 23, 1990	3–3 OT	@ Vancouver Canucks (1989–90)	21–21–6
49	L	January 25, 1990	6–7	@ Edmonton Oilers (1989–90)	21–22–6
50	L	January 27, 1990	1–3	New York Rangers (1989–90)	21–23–6
51	W	January 30, 1990	5–2	New Jersey Devils (1989–90)	22–23–6

February

Game	Result	Date	Score	Opponent	Record
52	L	February 1, 1990	4–7	Chicago Blackhawks (1989–90)	22–24–6
53	W	February 3, 1990	4–3	Calgary Flames (1989–90)	23–24–6
54	W	February 6, 1990	5–3	@ Calgary Flames (1989–90)	24–24–6
55	L	February 8, 1990	1–5	Winnipeg Jets (1989–90)	24–25–6
56	L	February 10, 1990	6–7	@ Pittsburgh Penguins (1989–90)	24–26–6
57	L	February 12, 1990	3–5	@ Toronto Maple Leafs (1989–90)	24–27–6
58	L	February 14, 1990	5–6	@ Detroit Red Wings (1989–90)	24–28–6
59	L	February 15, 1990	3–6	@ Minnesota North Stars (1989–90)	24–29–6
60	W	February 17, 1990	7–1	Quebec Nordiques (1989–90)	25–29–6
61	W	February 19, 1990	3–2	Washington Capitals (1989–90)	26–29–6
62	W	February 21, 1990	4–2	Minnesota North Stars (1989–90)	27–29–6
63	L	February 24, 1990	4–6	Vancouver Canucks (1989–90)	27–30–6
64	W	February 28, 1990	4–2	Edmonton Oilers (1989–90)	28–30–6

March

Game	Result	Date	Score	Opponent	Record
65	L	March 2, 1990	3–9	@ Winnipeg Jets (1989–90)	28–31–6
66	L	March 4, 1990	2–5	@ Winnipeg Jets (1989–90)	28–32–6
67	L	March 5, 1990	0–5	@ Calgary Flames (1989–90)	28–33–6
68	L	March 7, 1990	2–5	Montreal Canadiens (1989–90)	28–34–6
69	W	March 10, 1990	8–2	Pittsburgh Penguins (1989–90)	29–34–6
70	W	March 12, 1990	6–2	@ New York Rangers (1989–90)	30–34–6
71	W	March 14, 1990	6–5 OT	@ Buffalo Sabres (1989–90)	31–34–6
72	W	March 17, 1990	5–4	@ Boston Bruins (1989–90)	32–34–6
73	L	March 18, 1990	4–7	@ Philadelphia Flyers (1989–90)	32–35–6
74	L	March 20, 1990	2–5	@ Minnesota North Stars (1989–90)	32–36–6
75	W	March 22, 1990	3–1	New York Islanders (1989–90)	33–36–6
76	W	March 24, 1990	9–3	St. Louis Blues (1989–90)	34–36–6
77	T	March 27, 1990	4–4 OT	Winnipeg Jets (1989–90)	34–36–7
78	L	March 29, 1990	0–1	Winnipeg Jets (1989–90)	34–37–7
79	L	March 31, 1990	3–6	@ Vancouver Canucks (1989–90)	34–38–7

April

Game	Result	Date	Score	Opponent	Record
80	L	April 1, 1990	4–8	@ Calgary Flames (1989–90)	34–39–7

Legend: Win (2 points) Loss (0 points) Tie (1 point)

== Playoffs ==
=== Round 1: (S1) Calgary Flames vs. (S4) Los Angeles Kings ===
April 4	Los Angeles Kings	5–3	Calgary Flames	Olympic Saddledome

April 6	Los Angeles Kings	5–8	Calgary Flames	Olympic Saddledome

April 8	Calgary Flames	1–2	OT	Los Angeles Kings	Great Western Forum

April 10	Calgary Flames	4–12	Los Angeles Kings	Great Western Forum

April 12	Los Angeles Kings	1–5	Calgary Flames	Olympic Saddledome

April 14	Calgary Flames	3–4	2OT	Los Angeles Kings	Great Western Forum

Los Angeles won series 4–2

=== Round 2: (S2) Edmonton Oilers vs. (S4) Los Angeles Kings ===
April 18	Los Angeles Kings	0–7	Edmonton Oilers	Northlands Coliseum

April 20	Los Angeles Kings	1–6	Edmonton Oilers	Northlands Coliseum

April 22	Edmonton Oilers	5–4	Los Angeles Kings	Great Western Forum

April 24	Edmonton Oilers	6–5	OT	Los Angeles Kings	Great Western Forum

Edmonton won series 4–0

== Player statistics ==
Regular season
Scoring

Player	Pos	GP	G	A	Pts	PIM	+/-	PPG	SHG	GWG
Wayne Gretzky	C	73	40	102	142	42	8	10	4	4
Luc Robitaille	LW	80	52	49	101	38	8	20	0	7
Bernie Nicholls	C	47	27	48	75	66	-6	8	0	1
John Tonelli	LW	73	31	37	68	62	-8	15	0	4
Steve Duchesne	D	79	20	42	62	36	-3	6	0	1
Steve Kasper	C	77	17	28	45	27	4	1	1	4
Mike Krushelnyski	LW/C	63	16	25	41	50	7	2	2	2
Dave Taylor	RW	58	15	26	41	96	17	2	0	1
Larry Robinson	D	64	7	32	39	34	7	1	0	1
Bob Kudelski	RW	62	23	13	36	49	-7	2	2	3
Marty McSorley	D	75	15	21	36	322	2	2	1	0
Tomas Sandstrom	RW	28	13	20	33	28	-1	1	1	0
Todd Elik	C	48	10	23	33	41	4	1	0	0
Brian Benning	D	48	5	18	23	104	1	3	0	0
Mikko Makela	RW	45	7	14	21	16	-4	0	0	0
Keith Crowder	RW	55	4	13	17	93	2	0	0	1
Mike Allison	LW	55	2	11	13	78	-6	0	0	1
Jay Miller	LW	68	10	2	12	224	-6	0	0	1
Tony Granato	RW	19	5	6	11	45	-2	1	0	0
Tim Watters	D	62	1	10	11	92	23	0	0	0
Petr Prajsler	D	34	3	7	10	47	-9	1	0	0
Tom Laidlaw	D	57	1	8	9	42	4	0	0	0
Barry Beck	D	52	1	7	8	53	3	0	0	0
Hubie McDonough	C	22	3	4	7	10	4	0	0	1
Craig Duncanson	LW	10	3	2	5	9	1	0	0	0
Chris Kontos	LW/C	6	2	2	4	4	3	0	0	0
Mikael Lindholm	C	18	2	2	4	2	2	0	0	0
Bob Halkidis	D	20	0	4	4	56	4	0	0	0
Scott Bjugstad	RW	11	1	2	3	2	2	0	0	1
Jim Fox	RW	11	1	1	2	0	-1	0	0	1
Ken Baumgartner	LW	12	1	0	1	28	-10	0	0	0
Rob Blake	D	4	0	0	0	4	0	0	0	0
Mario Gosselin	G	26	0	0	0	0	0	0	0	0
Kelly Hrudey	G	52	0	0	0	18	0	0	0	0
Ron Scott	G	12	0	0	0	2	0	0	0	0
Robb Stauber	G	2	0	0	0	0	0	0	0	0
Gord Walker	RW	1	0	0	0	0	0	0	0	0

Goaltending

Player	MIN	GP	W	L	T	GA	GAA	SO	SA	SV	SV%
Kelly Hrudey	2860	52	22	21	6	194	4.07	2	1532	1338	.873
Mario Gosselin	1226	26	7	11	1	79	3.87	0	587	508	.865
Ron Scott	654	12	5	6	0	40	3.67	0	321	281	.875
Robb Stauber	83	2	0	1	0	11	7.95	0	43	32	.744
Team:	4823	80	34	39	7	324	4.03	2	2483	2159	.870

Playoffs
Scoring

Player	Pos	GP	G	A	Pts	PIM	+/-	PPG	SHG	GWG
Todd Elik	C	10	3	9	12	10	1	1	0	0
Steve Duchesne	D	10	2	9	11	6	-2	1	0	0
Luc Robitaille	LW	10	5	5	10	12	-5	1	0	1
Wayne Gretzky	C	7	3	7	10	0	-4	1	0	0
Tony Granato	RW	10	5	4	9	12	-2	2	1	2
Tomas Sandstrom	RW	10	5	4	9	19	-5	0	0	0
Dave Taylor	RW	6	4	4	8	2	2	2	0	0
Larry Robinson	D	10	2	3	5	10	2	0	0	0
Rob Blake	D	8	1	3	4	4	-4	1	0	0
Mike Krushelnyski	LW/C	10	1	3	4	12	0	0	0	1
Marty McSorley	D	10	1	3	4	18	-8	1	0	0
Bob Kudelski	RW	8	1	2	3	2	-5	0	0	0
John Tonelli	LW	10	1	2	3	6	-6	0	0	0
Steve Kasper	C	10	1	1	2	2	-4	0	0	0
Jay Miller	LW	10	1	1	2	10	-6	0	0	0
Brian Benning	D	7	0	2	2	10	-9	0	0	0
Mike Allison	LW	4	1	0	1	2	-2	0	1	0
Keith Crowder	RW	7	1	0	1	9	-1	0	0	0
Chris Kontos	LW/C	5	1	0	1	0	-6	0	1	0
Bob Halkidis	D	8	0	1	1	8	-7	0	0	0
Kelly Hrudey	G	9	0	1	1	0	0	0	0	0
Scott Bjugstad	RW	2	0	0	0	2	-1	0	0	0
Mario Gosselin	G	3	0	0	0	0	0	0	0	0
Mikko Makela	RW	1	0	0	0	0	0	0	0	0
Petr Prajsler	D	3	0	0	0	0	-1	0	0	0
Ron Scott	G	1	0	0	0	0	0	0	0	0
Tim Watters	D	4	0	0	0	6	4	0	0	0

Goaltending

Player	MIN	GP	W	L	GA	GAA	SO	SA	SV	SV%
Kelly Hrudey	539	9	4	4	39	4.34	0	265	226	.853
Mario Gosselin	63	3	0	2	3	2.86	0	23	20	.870
Ron Scott	32	1	0	0	4	7.50	0	10	6	.600
Team:	634	10	4	6	46	4.35	0	298	252	.846

Note:

Pos = Position;GP = Games played; G = Goals; A = Assists; Pts = Points; PIM = Penalty minutes; +/- = Plus/minus; PPG = Power-play goals; SHG = Short-handed goals; GWG = Game-winning goals
Pos = Position;GP = Games played; Min, TOI = Minutes played; W = Wins; L = Losses; T,T/OT = Ties; OTL = Overtime losses; GA = Goals-against; GAA = Goals-against average; SO = Shutouts; SA = Shots against; SV = Shots saved;SV% = Save percentage;

== Awards and honors ==
- Wayne Gretzky, Runner Up, Lady Byng Memorial Trophy

== Transactions ==
The Kings were involved in the following transactions during the 1989–90 season.

=== Trades ===
June 17, 1989	To Los Angeles Kings 5th round pick in 1989 - Tom Newman	To Washington Capitals Alan May
September 1, 1989	To Los Angeles Kings Barry Beck	To New York Rangers 4th round pick in 1990 - Jeff Nielsen
October 4, 1989	To Los Angeles Kings 4th round pick in 1991 - Keith Redmond	To Buffalo Sabres Dean Kennedy
November 10, 1989	To Los Angeles Kings Brian Benning	To St. Louis Blues 3rd round pick in 1991 - Kyle Reeves
November 24, 1989	To Los Angeles Kings Bob Halkidis; Future considerations	To Buffalo Sabres Dale DeGray
November 29, 1989	To Los Angeles Kings Mikko Mäkelä	To New York Islanders Hubie McDonough; Ken Baumgartner
December 1, 1989	To Los Angeles Kings Brad Jones	To Winnipeg Jets Phil Sykes
January 20, 1990	To Los Angeles Kings Tony Granato; Tomas Sandstrom	To New York Rangers Bernie Nicholls

=== Free agent signings ===
May 19, 1989	From Belleville Bulls (OHL) Darryl Williams
June 14, 1989	From Quebec Nordiques Mario Gosselin
June 17, 1989	From Boston Bruins Keith Crowder
June 17, 1989	From University of Minnesota (WCHA) Robb Stauber
July 26, 1989	From Montreal Canadiens Larry Robinson (3 years, $1.7 million)
August 24, 1989	From Pittsburgh Penguins Scott Bjugstad
January 12, 1990	From New York Rangers Ron Scott

=== Free agents lost ===
July 6, 1989	To Boston Bruins Jim Wiemer
August 10, 1989	To New Jersey Devils Roland Melanson
August 16, 1989	To New York Islanders Glenn Healy

=== Free agent compensation ===
August 16, 1989	To Los Angeles Kings 4th round pick in 1990 - Jeff Nielsen	To New York Islanders Glenn Healy

=== Waivers ===
March 6, 1990	To New York Islanders Dave Pasin
