= 1989–90 Washington Capitals season =

NHL hockey team season

1989–90 Washington Capitals
- Division: 3rd Patrick
- Conference: 7th Wales
- 1989–90 record: 36–38–6
- Home record: 19–18–3
- Road record: 17–20–3
- Goals for: 284
- Goals against: 275

Team information
- General manager: David Poile
- Coach: Bryan Murray; Terry Murray
- Captain: Rod Langway
- Alternate captains: Dale Hunter; Scott Stevens
- Arena: Capital Centre

Team leaders
- Goals: Dino Ciccarelli (41)
- Assists: Mike Ridley (43)
- Points: Dino Ciccarelli (79)
- Penalty minutes: Alan May (339)
- Plus/minus: Geoff Courtnall (+27)
- Wins: Don Beaupre (23)
- Goals against average: Mike Liut (2.13)

The 1989–90 Washington Capitals season was the Washington Capitals 16th season in the National Hockey League (NHL). The team reached the Prince of Wales Conference Finals for the first time, losing to the Bruins 4 games to 0.

== Offseason ==
=== NHL draft ===
Round	Pick	Player	Nationality	College/Junior/Club team
1	19	Olaf Kolzig (G)	West Germany	Tri-City Americans (WHL)
2	35	Byron Dafoe (G)	Canada	Portland Winter Hawks (WHL)
3	59	Jim Mathieson (D)	Canada	Regina Pats (WHL)
3	61	Jason Woolley (D)	Canada	Michigan State University (CCHA)
4	82	Trent Klatt (RW)	United States	Osseo Senior High School (USHS-MN)
7	145	Dave Lorentz (LW)	Canada	Peterborough Petes (OHL)
8	166	Dean Holoien (RW)	Canada	Saskatoon Blades (WHL)
9	187	Victor Gervais (C)	Canada	Seattle Thunderbirds (WHL)
10	208	Jiri Vykoukal (D)	Czechoslovakia	TJ DS Olomouc (Czechoslovakia)
11	229	Andrei Sidorov (LW)	Soviet Union	Dynamo Moscow (USSR)
12	250	Ken House (C)	Canada	Miami University (CCHA)
S	24	Karl Clauss (D)	United States	Colgate University (ECAC)

== Regular season ==
=== Final standings ===
Patrick Division
	GP	W	L	T	GF	GA	Pts
**New York Rangers**	80	36	31	13	279	267	85
**New Jersey Devils**	80	37	34	9	295	288	83
**Washington Capitals**	80	36	38	6	284	275	78
**New York Islanders**	80	31	38	11	281	288	73
Pittsburgh Penguins	80	32	40	8	318	359	72
Philadelphia Flyers	80	30	39	11	290	297	71

Note: GP = Games played, W = Wins, L = Losses, T = Ties, Pts = Points, GF = Goals for, GA = Goals against
Note: Teams that qualified for the playoffs are highlighted in bold.

Wales Conference
R		Div	GP	W	L	T	GF	GA	Pts
**1**	**p – Boston Bruins**	**ADM**	**80**	**46**	**25**	**9**	**289**	**232**	**101**
**2**	**Buffalo Sabres**	**ADM**	**80**	**45**	**27**	**8**	**286**	**248**	**98**
**3**	**Montreal Canadiens**	**ADM**	**80**	**41**	**28**	**11**	**288**	**234**	**93**
**4**	**Hartford Whalers**	**ADM**	**80**	**38**	**33**	**9**	**275**	**268**	**85**
**5**	**New York Rangers**	**PTK**	**80**	**36**	**31**	**13**	**279**	**267**	**85**
**6**	**New Jersey Devils**	**PTK**	**80**	**37**	**34**	**9**	**295**	**288**	**83**
**7**	**Washington Capitals**	**PTK**	**80**	**36**	**38**	**6**	**284**	**275**	**78**
**8**	**New York Islanders**	**PTK**	**80**	**31**	**38**	**11**	**281**	**288**	**73**
9	Pittsburgh Penguins	PTK	80	32	40	8	318	359	72
10	Philadelphia Flyers	PTK	80	30	39	11	290	297	71
11	Quebec Nordiques	ADM	80	12	61	7	240	407	31

Divisions: PTK – Patrick, ADM – Adams

bold – Qualified for playoffs; p – Won Presidents' Trophy

=== Record vs. opponents ===
==== Vs. Wales Conference ====
**Vs. Patrick Division**

1989–90 NHL records
Team	**NJD**	**NYI**	**NYR**	**PHI**	**PIT**	**WSH**	**Total**
New Jersey	—	4–1–2	3–3–1	4–2–1	4–2–1	3–4	18–12–5
N.Y. Islanders	1–4–2	—	2–3–2	1–4–2	3–3–1	4–3	11–17–7
N.Y. Rangers	3–3–1	3–2–2	—	5–2	1–5–1	3–4	15–16–4
Philadelphia	2–4–1	4–1–2	2–5	—	4–3	1–5–1	13–18–4
Pittsburgh	2–4–1	3–3–1	5–1–1	3–4	—	5–2	18–14–3
Washington	4–3	3–4	4–3	5–1–1	2–5	—	18–16–1

**Vs. Adams Division**

1989–90 NHL records
Team	**BOS**	**BUF**	**HFD**	**MTL**	**QUE**	**Total**
New Jersey	1–1–1	2–1	1–2	1–2	3–0	8–6–1
N.Y. Islanders	1–1–1	3–0	1–2	1–2	1–2	7–7–1
N.Y. Rangers	3–0	0–2–1	2–1	0–3	3–0	8–6–1
Philadelphia	0–3	1–2	1–2	2–0–1	1–1–1	5–8–2
Pittsburgh	1–2	0–3	0–2–1	1–2	2–1	4–10–1
Washington	1–2	1–1–1	1–2	2–1	3–0	8–6–1

==== Vs. Campbell Conference ====
**Vs. Norris Division**

1989–90 NHL records
Team	**CHI**	**DET**	**MIN**	**STL**	**TOR**	**Total**
New Jersey	2–1	1–1–1	1–2	2–1	1–2	7–7–1
N.Y. Islanders	1–2	1–1–1	1–2	1–2	3–0	7–7–1
N.Y. Rangers	1–0–2	2–0–1	1–1–1	0–2–1	1–1–1	5–4–6
Philadelphia	0–3	0–1–2	2–1	2–1	2–1	6–7–2
Pittsburgh	0–3	2–0–1	1–1–1	0–3	1–2	4–9–2
Washington	1–2	3–0	3–0	0–2–1	1–2	8–6–1

**Vs. Smythe Division**

1989–90 NHL records
Team	**CGY**	**EDM**	**LAK**	**VAN**	**WIN**	**Total**
New Jersey	0–3	1–0–2	2–1	0–3	1–2	4–9–2
N.Y. Islanders	0–3	0–1–2	2–1	2–1	2–1	6–7–2
N.Y. Rangers	1–2	2–0–1	1–2	3–0	1–1–1	8–5–2
Philadelphia	1–1–1	1–2	3–0	0–1–2	1–2	6–6–3
Pittsburgh	0–2–1	2–1	1–2	1–2	2–0–1	6–7–2
Washington	1–0–2	1–2	0–3	0–2–1	0–3	2–10–3

== Schedule and results ==
1989–90 regular season
October

Game	Result	Date	Score	Opponent	Record
1	W	October 6, 1989	5–3	Philadelphia Flyers (1989–90)	1–0–0
2	L	October 7, 1989	2–3	Chicago Blackhawks (1989–90)	1–1–0
3	L	October 11, 1989	1–4	@ Hartford Whalers (1989–90)	1–2–0
4	W	October 13, 1989	7–4	New York Rangers (1989–90)	2–2–0
5	T	October 14, 1989	4–4 OT	Calgary Flames (1989–90)	2–2–1
6	W	October 16, 1989	4–3 OT	@ Montreal Canadiens (1989–90)	3–2–1
7	L	October 20, 1989	3–5	New York Islanders (1989–90)	3–3–1
8	L	October 21, 1989	4–8	@ Toronto Maple Leafs (1989–90)	3–4–1
9	T	October 23, 1989	3–3 OT	@ Calgary Flames (1989–90)	3–4–2
10	L	October 25, 1989	4–6	@ Winnipeg Jets (1989–90)	3–5–2
11	L	October 28, 1989	0–1	@ St. Louis Blues (1989–90)	3–6–2
12	L	October 29, 1989	0–1	@ Chicago Blackhawks (1989–90)	3–7–2
13	T	October 31, 1989	1–1 OT	St. Louis Blues (1989–90)	3–7–3

November

Game	Result	Date	Score	Opponent	Record
14	W	November 3, 1989	2–1	Toronto Maple Leafs (1989–90)	4–7–3
15	W	November 5, 1989	3–0	@ Quebec Nordiques (1989–90)	5–7–3
16	W	November 7, 1989	5–3	@ New York Islanders (1989–90)	6–7–3
17	L	November 10, 1989	3–5	Boston Bruins (1989–90)	6–8–3
18	L	November 11, 1989	3–5	Edmonton Oilers (1989–90)	6–9–3
19	T	November 14, 1989	4–4 OT	@ Vancouver Canucks (1989–90)	6–9–4
20	L	November 18, 1989	3–5	@ Los Angeles Kings (1989–90)	6–10–4
21	W	November 22, 1989	5–3	New York Islanders (1989–90)	7–10–4
22	L	November 24, 1989	4–7	Pittsburgh Penguins (1989–90)	7–11–4
23	W	November 25, 1989	4–1	@ Pittsburgh Penguins (1989–90)	8–11–4
24	W	November 29, 1989	5–3	@ Detroit Red Wings (1989–90)	9–11–4

December

Game	Result	Date	Score	Opponent	Record
25	L	December 1, 1989	2–3	Philadelphia Flyers (1989–90)	9–12–4
26	W	December 2, 1989	5–3	@ New Jersey Devils (1989–90)	10–12–4
27	W	December 5, 1989	4–3	@ Philadelphia Flyers (1989–90)	11–12–4
28	L	December 6, 1989	3–5	@ Pittsburgh Penguins (1989–90)	11–13–4
29	W	December 9, 1989	7–3	@ Boston Bruins (1989–90)	12–13–4
30	L	December 10, 1989	3–4	@ Buffalo Sabres (1989–90)	12–14–4
31	L	December 15, 1989	3–5	New York Islanders (1989–90)	12–15–4
32	W	December 16, 1989	5–2	@ Hartford Whalers (1989–90)	13–15–4
33	W	December 19, 1989	2–1	@ Philadelphia Flyers (1989–90)	14–15–4
34	L	December 21, 1989	2–5	@ Pittsburgh Penguins (1989–90)	14–16–4
35	W	December 23, 1989	3–2	New York Rangers (1989–90)	15–16–4
36	W	December 26, 1989	6–3	Pittsburgh Penguins (1989–90)	16–16–4
37	W	December 27, 1989	3–1	@ New Jersey Devils (1989–90)	17–16–4
38	W	December 29, 1989	2–1	Detroit Red Wings (1989–90)	18–16–4

January

Game	Result	Date	Score	Opponent	Record
39	L	January 1, 1990	4–7	Los Angeles Kings (1989–90)	18–17–4
40	L	January 3, 1990	1–2	@ New York Rangers (1989–90)	18–18–4
41	L	January 5, 1990	2–5	Vancouver Canucks (1989–90)	18–19–4
42	L	January 6, 1990	3–5	@ Boston Bruins (1989–90)	18–20–4
43	L	January 8, 1990	6–8	@ Toronto Maple Leafs (1989–90)	18–21–4
44	L	January 10, 1990	1–6	@ Winnipeg Jets (1989–90)	18–22–4
45	L	January 12, 1990	4–6	Pittsburgh Penguins (1989–90)	18–23–4
46	L	January 13, 1990	2–4	@ New York Islanders (1989–90)	18–24–4
47	W	January 16, 1990	9–6	New Jersey Devils (1989–90)	19–24–4
48	W	January 19, 1990	6–3	@ Buffalo Sabres (1989–90)	20–24–4
49	L	January 23, 1990	3–4	Winnipeg Jets (1989–90)	20–25–4
50	L	January 24, 1990	2–3	@ New Jersey Devils (1989–90)	20–26–4
51	W	January 26, 1990	6–3	Montreal Canadiens (1989–90)	21–26–4
52	W	January 28, 1990	7–2	Philadelphia Flyers (1989–90)	22–26–4
53	W	January 31, 1990	4–3 OT	@ Minnesota North Stars (1989–90)	23–26–4

February

Game	Result	Date	Score	Opponent	Record
54	L	February 2, 1990	3–5	@ New York Islanders (1989–90)	23–27–4
55	L	February 4, 1990	4–5 OT	Edmonton Oilers (1989–90)	23–28–4
56	W	February 6, 1990	12–2	Quebec Nordiques (1989–90)	24–28–4
57	L	February 8, 1990	5–7	@ Pittsburgh Penguins (1989–90)	24–29–4
58	L	February 9, 1990	3–5	New Jersey Devils (1989–90)	24–30–4
59	W	February 11, 1990	5–3	Minnesota North Stars (1989–90)	25–30–4
60	W	February 14, 1990	4–3	@ Edmonton Oilers (1989–90)	26–30–4
61	L	February 19, 1990	2–3	@ Los Angeles Kings (1989–90)	26–31–4
62	L	February 23, 1990	3–6	New York Rangers (1989–90)	26–32–4
63	W	February 25, 1990	9–4	Detroit Red Wings (1989–90)	27–32–4
64	W	February 27, 1990	4–0	Chicago Blackhawks (1989–90)	28–32–4
65	L	February 28, 1990	2–3	@ New York Rangers (1989–90)	28–33–4

March

Game	Result	Date	Score	Opponent	Record
66	L	March 2, 1990	3–4	Hartford Whalers (1989–90)	28–34–4
67	W	March 4, 1990	4–3	New Jersey Devils (1989–90)	29–34–4
68	T	March 6, 1990	1–1 OT	Buffalo Sabres (1989–90)	29–34–5
69	W	March 9, 1990	4–3	Quebec Nordiques (1989–90)	30–34–5
70	W	March 10, 1990	4–3	@ Philadelphia Flyers (1989–90)	31–34–5
71	L	March 13, 1990	1–4	St. Louis Blues (1989–90)	31–35–5
72	L	March 17, 1990	1–3	Vancouver Canucks (1989–90)	31–36–5
73	W	March 18, 1990	4–3	@ Minnesota North Stars (1989–90)	32–36–5
74	W	March 20, 1990	3–0	New York Islanders (1989–90)	33–36–5
75	L	March 23, 1990	2–4	Montreal Canadiens (1989–90)	33–37–5
76	W	March 25, 1990	4–1	Calgary Flames (1989–90)	34–37–5
77	L	March 27, 1990	1–4	@ New Jersey Devils (1989–90)	34–38–5
78	T	March 29, 1990	2–2 OT	@ Philadelphia Flyers (1989–90)	34–38–6
79	W	March 31, 1990	2–1	New York Rangers (1989–90)	35–38–6

April

Game	Result	Date	Score	Opponent	Record
80	W	April 1, 1990	3–2	@ New York Rangers (1989–90)	36–38–6

Legend: Win (2 points) Loss (0 points) Tie (1 point)

== Playoffs ==
=== Round 1: (P2) New Jersey Devils vs. (P3) Washington Capitals ===
April 5	Washington Capitals	5–4	OT	New Jersey Devils	Brendan Byrne Arena

April 7	Washington Capitals	5–6	New Jersey Devils	Brendan Byrne Arena

April 9	New Jersey Devils	2–1	Washington Capitals	Capital Centre

April 11	New Jersey Devils	1–3	Washington Capitals	Capital Centre

April 13	Washington Capitals	4–3	New Jersey Devils	Brendan Byrne Arena

April 15	New Jersey Devils	2–3	Washington Capitals	Capital Centre

Washington won series 4–2

=== Round 2: (P1) New York Rangers vs. (P3) Washington Capitals ===
April 19	Washington Capitals	3–7	New York Rangers	Madison Square Garden

April 21	Washington Capitals	6–3	New York Rangers	Madison Square Garden

April 23	New York Rangers	1–7	Washington Capitals	Capital Centre

April 25	New York Rangers	3–4	OT	Washington Capitals	Capital Centre

April 27	Washington Capitals	2–1	OT	New York Rangers	Madison Square Garden

Washington won series 4–1

=== Conference Finals: (A1) Boston Bruins vs. (P3) Washington Capitals ===
May 3	Washington Capitals	3–5	Boston Bruins	Boston Garden

May 5	Washington Capitals	0–3	Boston Bruins	Boston Garden

May 7	Boston Bruins	4–1	Washington Capitals	Capital Centre

May 9	Boston Bruins	3–2	Washington Capitals	Capital Centre

Boston won series 4–0

== Player statistics ==
=== Regular season ===
Scoring

Player	Pos	GP	G	A	Pts	PIM	+/-	PPG	SHG	GWG
Dino Ciccarelli	RW	80	41	38	79	122	-5	10	0	6
Geoff Courtnall	LW	80	35	39	74	104	27	9	0	2
Mike Ridley	C	74	30	43	73	27	0	8	3	3
Michal Pivonka	C	77	25	39	64	54	-7	10	3	0
Dale Hunter	C	80	23	39	62	233	17	9	1	6
Kevin Hatcher	D	80	13	41	54	102	4	4	0	2
Kelly Miller	LW	80	18	22	40	49	-2	3	2	2
Scott Stevens	D	56	11	29	40	154	1	7	0	0
Calle Johansson	D	70	8	31	39	25	7	4	0	2
Stephen Leach	RW	70	18	14	32	104	10	0	0	2
John Tucker	C	38	9	19	28	10	11	1	0	1
Bob Rouse	D	70	4	16	20	123	-2	0	0	2
Alan May	RW	77	7	10	17	339	-1	1	0	2
Yvon Corriveau	LW	50	9	6	15	50	-1	1	0	1
Bob Joyce	LW	24	5	8	13	4	2	1	0	1
Bill Houlder	D	41	1	11	12	28	8	0	0	0
John Druce	RW	45	8	3	11	52	-3	1	0	1
Dave Christian	RW	28	3	8	11	4	-12	0	0	1
Nick Kypreos	LW	31	5	4	9	82	2	0	0	2
Rob Murray	C	41	2	7	9	58	-10	0	0	0
Doug Wickenheiser	C	27	1	8	9	20	1	0	0	0
Rod Langway	D	58	0	8	8	39	7	0	0	0
Tim Bergland	RW	32	2	5	7	31	2	0	0	0
Neil Sheehy	D	59	1	5	6	291	8	0	0	0
Scot Kleinendorst	D	15	1	3	4	16	4	0	0	0
Kent Paynter	D	13	1	2	3	18	-7	0	0	0
Mike Richard	C	3	0	2	2	0	0	0	0	0
Alfie Turcotte	C	4	0	2	2	0	0	0	0	0
Robin Bawa	RW	5	1	0	1	6	-3	0	0	0
Chris Felix	D	6	1	0	1	2	-6	1	0	0
Brian Tutt	D	7	1	0	1	2	-4	0	0	0
Don Beaupre	G	48	0	1	1	24	0	0	0	0
Jim Hrivnak	G	11	0	1	1	0	0	0	0	0
Alain Cote	D	2	0	0	0	7	-2	0	0	0
Mark Ferner	D	2	0	0	0	0	-1	0	0	0
Olaf Kolzig	G	2	0	0	0	0	0	0	0	0
Tyler Larter	C	1	0	0	0	0	-1	0	0	0
Mike Liut	G	8	0	0	0	0	0	0	0	0
Steve Maltais	LW	8	0	0	0	2	-2	0	0	0
Bob Mason	G	16	0	0	0	4	0	0	0	0
Jim Mathieson	D	2	0	0	0	4	0	0	0	0
Dennis Smith	D	4	0	0	0	0	0	0	0	0

Goaltending

Player	MIN	GP	W	L	T	GA	GAA	SO	SA	SV	SV%
Don Beaupre	2793	48	23	18	5	150	3.22	2	1362	1212	.890
Jim Hrivnak	609	11	5	5	0	36	3.55	0	293	257	.877
Mike Liut	478	8	4	4	0	17	2.13	1	217	200	.922
Bob Mason	822	16	4	9	1	48	3.50	0	389	341	.877
Olaf Kolzig	120	2	0	2	0	12	6.00	0	63	51	.810
Team:	4822	80	36	38	6	263	3.27	3	2324	2061	.887

=== Playoffs ===
Scoring

Player	Pos	GP	G	A	Pts	PIM	PPG	SHG	GWG
John Druce	RW	15	14	3	17	23	8	1	4
Geoff Courtnall	LW	15	4	9	13	32	1	0	2
Dale Hunter	C	15	4	8	12	61	1	0	0
Dino Ciccarelli	RW	8	8	3	11	6	1	0	1
Scott Stevens	D	15	2	7	9	25	1	0	0
Kelly Miller	LW	15	3	5	8	23	0	1	0
John Tucker	C	12	1	7	8	4	0	0	0
Kevin Hatcher	D	11	0	8	8	32	0	0	0
Mike Ridley	C	14	3	4	7	8	0	1	0
Calle Johansson	D	15	1	6	7	4	0	0	0
Bob Rouse	D	15	2	3	5	47	1	0	0
Rod Langway	D	15	1	4	5	12	0	0	1
Stephen Leach	RW	14	2	2	4	8	0	0	0
Bob Joyce	LW	14	2	1	3	9	0	0	0
Tim Bergland	RW	15	1	1	2	10	0	0	0
Michal Pivonka	C	11	0	2	2	6	0	0	0
Nick Kypreos	LW	7	1	0	1	15	0	0	0
Neil Sheehy	D	13	0	1	1	92	0	0	0
Don Beaupre	G	8	0	0	0	2	0	0	0
Scot Kleinendorst	D	3	0	0	0	0	0	0	0
Mike Liut	G	9	0	0	0	0	0	0	0
Steve Maltais	LW	1	0	0	0	0	0	0	0
Alan May	RW	15	0	0	0	37	0	0	0
Rob Murray	C	9	0	0	0	18	0	0	0
Kent Paynter	D	3	0	0	0	10	0	0	0

Goaltending

Player	MIN	GP	W	L	GA	GAA	SO	SA	SV	SV%
Don Beaupre	401	8	4	3	18	2.69	0	187	169	.904
Mike Liut	507	9	4	4	28	3.31	0	223	195	.874
Team:	908	15	8	7	46	3.04	0	410	364	.888

Note: GP = Games played; G = Goals; A = Assists; Pts = Points; +/- = Plus/minus; PIM = Penalty minutes; PPG=Power-play goals; SHG=Short-handed goals; GWG=Game-winning goals
MIN=Minutes played; W = Wins; L = Losses; T = Ties; GA = Goals against; GAA = Goals against average; SO = Shutouts; SA=Shots against; SV=Shots saved; SV% = Save percentage;
