= 1989–90 NHL season =

National Hockey League season

- League: National Hockey League
- Sport: Ice hockey
- Duration: October 5, 1989 – May 24, 1990
- Games: 80
- Teams: 21
- TV partner(s): CBC, TSN, SRC (Canada); SportsChannel America, NBC (Note: NBC only televised the All-Star Game.) (United States)

Draft
- Top draft pick: Mats Sundin
- Picked by: Quebec Nordiques

Regular season
- Presidents' Trophy: Boston Bruins
- Season MVP: Mark Messier (Oilers)
- Top scorer: Wayne Gretzky (Kings)

Playoffs
- Playoffs MVP: Bill Ranford (Oilers)

Stanley Cup
- Champions: Edmonton Oilers
- Runners-up: Boston Bruins

NHL seasons
- 1988–89 1990–91

The 1989–90 NHL season was the 73rd season of the National Hockey League. The Stanley Cup winners were the Edmonton Oilers, who won the best of seven series 4–1 against the Boston Bruins. The championship was the Oilers' fifth Stanley Cup in seven seasons.

== Entry draft ==
The 1989 NHL entry draft was held on June 17, at the Met Center in Bloomington, Minnesota. Mats Sundin was selected first overall by the Quebec Nordiques.

== Regular season ==
Wayne Gretzky records his 1,851st point, passing Gordie Howe for the most in NHL history on Oct. 15, 1989.

This season marked the first time that all three New York City area NHL teams, including the New Jersey Devils, made the playoffs in the same season, a feat which has since been repeated thrice more: in the 1993–94, the 2006–07, and the 2022–23 seasons.

Until 2017, this was last time the Detroit Red Wings missed the Stanley Cup playoffs.

Sam St. Laurent of the Red Wings became the last goalie to wear a full fiberglass mask during an NHL game.

=== Final standings ===
Note: W = Wins, L = Losses, T = Ties, GF= Goals For, GA = Goals Against, Pts = Points, PIM = Penalties in minutes

==== Prince of Wales Conference ====
Adams Division
	GP	W	L	T	GF	GA	Pts
Boston Bruins	80	46	25	9	289	232	101
Buffalo Sabres	80	45	27	8	286	248	98
Montreal Canadiens	80	41	28	11	288	234	93
Hartford Whalers	80	38	33	9	275	268	85
Quebec Nordiques	80	12	61	7	240	407	31

Patrick Division
	GP	W	L	T	GF	GA	Pts
New York Rangers	80	36	31	13	279	267	85
New Jersey Devils	80	37	34	9	295	288	83
Washington Capitals	80	36	38	6	284	275	78
New York Islanders	80	31	38	11	281	288	73
Pittsburgh Penguins	80	32	40	8	318	359	72
Philadelphia Flyers	80	30	39	11	290	297	71

==== Clarence Campbell Conference ====
Norris Division
	GP	W	L	T	GF	GA	Pts
Chicago Blackhawks	80	41	33	6	315	294	88
St. Louis Blues	80	37	34	9	295	279	83
Toronto Maple Leafs	80	38	38	4	337	358	80
Minnesota North Stars	80	36	40	4	284	291	76
Detroit Red Wings	80	28	38	14	288	323	70

Smythe Division
	GP	W	L	T	GF	GA	Pts
Calgary Flames	80	42	23	15	348	265	99
Edmonton Oilers	80	38	28	14	315	283	90
Winnipeg Jets	80	37	32	11	298	290	85
Los Angeles Kings	80	34	39	7	338	337	75
Vancouver Canucks	80	25	41	14	245	306	64

== Playoffs ==
=== Bracket ===
The top four teams in each division qualified for the playoffs. In each round, teams competed in a best-of-seven series (scores in the bracket indicate the number of games won in each best-of-seven series). In the division semifinals, the fourth seeded team in each division played against the division winner from their division. The other series matched the second and third place teams from the divisions. The two winning teams from each division's semifinals then met in the division finals. The two division winners of each conference then played in the conference finals. The two conference winners then advanced to the Stanley Cup Final.

Division semifinals	Division finals
A1	Boston	4
A4	Hartford	3
A1	Boston	4
A3	Montreal	1
A2	Buffalo	2
A3	Montreal	4
Prince of Wales Conference
P1	NY Rangers	4
P4	NY Islanders	1
P1	NY Rangers	1
P3	Washington	4
P2	New Jersey	2
P3	Washington	4
N1	Chicago	4
N4	Minnesota	3
N1	Chicago	4
N2	St. Louis	3
N2	St. Louis	4
N3	Toronto	1
Clarence Campbell Conference
S1	Calgary	2
S4	Los Angeles	4
S4	Los Angeles	0
S2	Edmonton	4
S2	Edmonton	4
S3	Winnipeg	3

Conference finals
A1	Boston	4
P3	Washington	0
N1	Chicago	2
S2	Edmonton	4

Stanley Cup Final
A1	Boston	1
S2	Edmonton	4

== Awards ==
1989–90 NHL awards
Award	Recipient(s)	Runner(s)-up/Finalists
Presidents' Trophy (Best regular-season record)	Boston Bruins	Calgary Flames
Prince of Wales Trophy (Wales Conference playoff champion)	Boston Bruins	Washington Capitals
Clarence S. Campbell Bowl (Campbell Conference playoff champion)	Edmonton Oilers	Chicago Blackhawks
Alka-Seltzer Plus-Minus Award (Best plus-minus statistic)	Paul Cavallini (St. Louis Blues)	Stephane Richer (Montreal Canadiens)
Art Ross Trophy (Player with most points)	Wayne Gretzky (Los Angeles Kings)	Mark Messier (Edmonton Oilers)
Bill Masterton Memorial Trophy (Perseverance, sportsmanship, and dedication)	Gord Kluzak (Boston Bruins)	N/A
Calder Memorial Trophy (Best first-year player)	Sergei Makarov (Calgary Flames)	Mike Modano (Minnesota North Stars); Jeremy Roenick (Chicago Blackhawks)
Conn Smythe Trophy (Most valuable player, playoffs)	Bill Ranford (Edmonton Oilers)	N/A
Frank J. Selke Trophy (Best defensive forward)	Rick Meagher (St. Louis Blues)	Guy Carbonneau (Montreal Canadiens); Esa Tikkanen (Edmonton Oilers)
Hart Memorial Trophy (Most valuable player, regular season)	Mark Messier (Edmonton Oilers)	Ray Bourque (Boston Bruins); Brett Hull (St. Louis Blues)
Jack Adams Award (Best coach)	Bob Murdoch (Winnipeg Jets)	Mike Milbury (Boston Bruins); Roger Neilson (New York Rangers)
James Norris Memorial Trophy (Best defenceman)	Ray Bourque (Boston Bruins)	Al MacInnis (Calgary Flames); Doug Wilson (Chicago Blackhawks)
King Clancy Memorial Trophy (Leadership and humanitarian contribution)	Kevin Lowe (Edmonton Oilers)	N/A
Lady Byng Memorial Trophy (Sportsmanship and excellence)	Brett Hull (St. Louis Blues)	Wayne Gretzky (Los Angeles Kings); Pat LaFontaine (New York Islanders)
Lester B. Pearson Award (Outstanding player)	Mark Messier (Edmonton Oilers)	N/A
Vezina Trophy (Best goaltender)	Patrick Roy (Montreal Canadiens)	Andy Moog (Boston Bruins); Daren Puppa (Buffalo Sabres)
William M. Jennings Trophy (Goaltender(s) of team with fewest goals against)	Andy Moog and Rejean Lemelin (Boston Bruins)	N/A

=== All-Star teams ===
First team	Position	Second team
Patrick Roy, Montreal Canadiens	G	Daren Puppa, Buffalo Sabres
Ray Bourque, Boston Bruins	D	Paul Coffey, Pittsburgh Penguins
Al MacInnis, Calgary Flames	D	Doug Wilson, Chicago Blackhawks
Mark Messier, Edmonton Oilers	C	Wayne Gretzky, Los Angeles Kings
Brett Hull, St. Louis Blues	RW	Cam Neely, Boston Bruins
Luc Robitaille, Los Angeles Kings	LW	Brian Bellows, Minnesota North Stars

== Player statistics ==
=== Scoring leaders ===
Note: GP = Games played; G = Goals; A = Assists; Pts = Points, PIM = Penalties in minutes, PPG = Powerplay Goals, SHG = Shorthanded Goals, GWG = Game Winning Goals

Player	Team	GP	G	A	Pts	PIM	+/−	PPG	SHG	GWG
Wayne Gretzky	Los Angeles Kings	73	40	102	142	42	+8	10	4	4
Mark Messier	Edmonton Oilers	79	45	84	129	79	+19	13	6	3
Steve Yzerman	Detroit Red Wings	79	62	65	127	79	-6	16	7	8
Mario Lemieux	Pittsburgh Penguins	59	45	78	123	78	-18	14	3	4
Brett Hull	St. Louis Blues	80	72	41	113	24	-1	27	0	12
Bernie Nicholls	Los Angeles Kings/ New York Rangers	79	39	73	112	86	-9	15	0	1
Pierre Turgeon	Buffalo Sabres	80	40	66	106	29	+10	17	1	10
Pat LaFontaine	New York Islanders	74	54	51	105	38	-13	13	2	8
Paul Coffey	Pittsburgh Penguins	80	29	74	103	95	-25	10	0	3
Joe Sakic	Quebec Nordiques	80	39	63	102	27	-40	8	1	2
Adam Oates	St. Louis Blues	80	23	79	102	30	9	6	2	3
Sources: NHL, Quanthockey.com.

=== Leading goaltenders ===
GP = Games played; Min = Minutes played; W = Wins; L = Losses; T = Ties; SO = Shutouts; GAA = Goals against average; Sv% = Save percentage

Player	Team	GP	Min	W	L	T	SO	GAA	Sv%
Mike Liut	Hartford Whalers/Washington Capitals	37	2160	19	16	1	4	2.53	.905
Patrick Roy	Montreal Canadiens	54	3173	31	16	5	3	2.53	.912
Rejean Lemelin	Boston Bruins	43	2310	22	15	2	2	2.80	.892
Andy Moog	Boston Bruins	46	2535	24	10	7	3	2.89	.893
Daren Puppa	Buffalo Sabres	56	3241	31	16	6	1	2.89	.903
Jacques Cloutier	Chicago Blackhawks	43	2178	18	15	2	2	3.09	.879
Mike Vernon	Calgary Flames	47	2795	23	14	9	0	3.13	.870
Bob Essensa	Winnipeg Jets	36	2961	18	9	5	1	3.15	.891
Bill Ranford	Edmonton Oilers	56	3107	24	16	9	1	3.19	.887
Don Beaupre	Washington Capitals	48	2793	23	18	5	2	3.22	.890
Jon Casey	Minnesota North Stars	61	3407	31	22	4	3	3.22	.896
Source: Quanthockey.com.

== Coaches ==
=== Patrick Division ===
- New Jersey Devils: Jim Schoenfeld and John Cunniff
- New York Islanders: Al Arbour
- New York Rangers: Roger Neilson
- Philadelphia Flyers: Paul Holmgren
- Pittsburgh Penguins: Gene Ubriaco and Craig Patrick
- Washington Capitals: Bryan Murray and Terry Murray

=== Adams Division ===
- Boston Bruins: Mike Milbury
- Buffalo Sabres: Rick Dudley
- Hartford Whalers: Rick Ley
- Montreal Canadiens: Pat Burns
- Quebec Nordiques: Michel Bergeron

=== Norris Division ===
- Chicago Blackhawks: Mike Keenan
- Detroit Red Wings: Jacques Demers
- Minnesota North Stars: Pierre Page
- St. Louis Blues: Brian Sutter
- Toronto Maple Leafs: Doug Carpenter

=== Smythe Division ===
- Calgary Flames: Terry Crisp
- Edmonton Oilers: John Muckler
- Los Angeles Kings: Tom Webster
- Vancouver Canucks: Bob McCammon
- Winnipeg Jets: Bob Murdoch

== Milestones ==
This season would be the last the Toronto Maple Leafs would play under the 29-year ownership of Harold Ballard as a result of his death in April 1990 and the subsequent sale of the franchise.

=== Debuts ===
The following is a list of players of note who played their first NHL game in 1989–90 (listed with their first team, asterisk (*) marks debut in playoffs):

- Wes Walz, Boston Bruins
- Alexander Mogilny, Buffalo Sabres
- Rob Ray, Buffalo Sabres
- Donald Audette*, Buffalo Sabres
- Sergei Makarov, Calgary Flames
- Rob Blake, Los Angeles Kings
- Helmut Balderis, Minnesota North Stars
- Mike Modano, Minnesota North Stars
- Andrew Cassels, Montreal Canadiens
- Lyle Odelein, Montreal Canadiens
- Vyacheslav Fetisov, New Jersey Devils
- Alexei Kasatonov, New Jersey Devils
- Murray Baron, Philadelphia Flyers
- Curtis Joseph, St. Louis Blues
- Tie Domi, Toronto Maple Leafs
- Vladimir Krutov, Vancouver Canucks
- Igor Larionov, Vancouver Canucks
- Olaf Kolzig, Washington Capitals

=== Last games ===
The following is a list of players of note that played their last game in the NHL in 1989–90 (listed with their last team):

- Reed Larson, Buffalo Sabres
- Al Secord, Chicago Blackhawks
- Bob Murray, Chicago Blackhawks
- Duane Sutter, Chicago Blackhawks
- Bernie Federko, Detroit Red Wings
- Borje Salming, Detroit Red Wings
- Reijo Ruotsalainen, Edmonton Oilers
- Barry Beck, Los Angeles Kings
- Helmut Balderis, Minnesota North Stars
- Curt Fraser, Minnesota North Stars
- Mark Johnson, New Jersey Devils
- Ron Greschner, New York Rangers
- Doug Smith, Pittsburgh Penguins
- Vladimir Krutov, Vancouver Canucks
- Paul Reinhart, Vancouver Canucks
- Doug Wickenheiser, Washington Capitals

== Broadcasting ==
This was the second season of the league's Canadian national broadcast rights deals with TSN and Hockey Night in Canada on CBC. Saturday night regular season games continued to air on CBC, while TSN televised selected weeknight games. Coverage of the Stanley Cup playoffs was primarily on CBC, with TSN airing first round all-U.S. series.

This was also the second season of the league's U.S. national broadcast rights deal SportsChannel America, with up to three regular season games a week and coverage of the playoffs. Meanwhile, NBC agreed to televise the All-Star Game, reportedly wanting to test the appeal of hockey.

== See also ==
- 1989 in sports
- 1989 NHL entry draft
- 1989–90 NHL transactions
- 1990 in sports
- 41st National Hockey League All-Star Game
- List of Stanley Cup champions
- National Hockey League All-Star Game
- NHL All-Rookie Team
