= 1989–90 New York Islanders season =

NHL hockey team season

1989–90 New York Islanders
- Division: 4th Patrick
- Conference: 8th Wales
- 1989–90 record: 31–38–11
- Home record: 15–17–8
- Road record: 16–21–3
- Goals for: 281
- Goals against: 288

Team information
- General manager: Bill Torrey
- Coach: Al Arbour
- Captain: Brent Sutter
- Alternate captains: Pat LaFontaine; Bryan Trottier
- Arena: Nassau Coliseum

Team leaders
- Goals: Pat LaFontaine (54)
- Assists: Pat LaFontaine (51)
- Points: Pat LaFontaine (105)
- Penalty minutes: Mick Vukota (290)
- Wins: Mark Fitzpatrick (19)
- Goals against average: Mark Fitzpatrick (3.39)

The 1989–90 New York Islanders season was the 18th season for the franchise in the National Hockey League (NHL). The team finished 31–38–11, returning to the Stanley Cup playoffs after a one-year absence, but losing to their rivals the New York Rangers in the first round, four games to one.

== Regular season ==
The Islanders finished the regular season with the fewest power-play opportunities of all 21 teams in the league with just 330. They also tied the Boston Bruins for most shutouts in the NHL, with 5.

=== Final standings ===
Patrick Division
	GP	W	L	T	GF	GA	Pts
**New York Rangers**	80	36	31	13	279	267	85
**New Jersey Devils**	80	37	34	9	295	288	83
**Washington Capitals**	80	36	38	6	284	275	78
**New York Islanders**	80	31	38	11	281	288	73
Pittsburgh Penguins	80	32	40	8	318	359	72
Philadelphia Flyers	80	30	39	11	290	297	71

Note: GP = Games played, W = Wins, L = Losses, T = Ties, Pts = Points, GF = Goals for, GA = Goals against
Note: Teams that qualified for the playoffs are highlighted in bold.

Wales Conference
R		Div	GP	W	L	T	GF	GA	Pts
**1**	**p – Boston Bruins**	**ADM**	**80**	**46**	**25**	**9**	**289**	**232**	**101**
**2**	**Buffalo Sabres**	**ADM**	**80**	**45**	**27**	**8**	**286**	**248**	**98**
**3**	**Montreal Canadiens**	**ADM**	**80**	**41**	**28**	**11**	**288**	**234**	**93**
**4**	**Hartford Whalers**	**ADM**	**80**	**38**	**33**	**9**	**275**	**268**	**85**
**5**	**New York Rangers**	**PTK**	**80**	**36**	**31**	**13**	**279**	**267**	**85**
**6**	**New Jersey Devils**	**PTK**	**80**	**37**	**34**	**9**	**295**	**288**	**83**
**7**	**Washington Capitals**	**PTK**	**80**	**36**	**38**	**6**	**284**	**275**	**78**
**8**	**New York Islanders**	**PTK**	**80**	**31**	**38**	**11**	**281**	**288**	**73**
9	Pittsburgh Penguins	PTK	80	32	40	8	318	359	72
10	Philadelphia Flyers	PTK	80	30	39	11	290	297	71
11	Quebec Nordiques	ADM	80	12	61	7	240	407	31

Divisions: PTK – Patrick, ADM – Adams

bold – Qualified for playoffs; p – Won Presidents' Trophy

=== Record vs. opponents ===
==== Vs. Wales Conference ====
**Vs. Patrick Division**

1989–90 NHL records
Team	**NJD**	**NYI**	**NYR**	**PHI**	**PIT**	**WSH**	**Total**
New Jersey	—	4–1–2	3–3–1	4–2–1	4–2–1	3–4	18–12–5
N.Y. Islanders	1–4–2	—	2–3–2	1–4–2	3–3–1	4–3	11–17–7
N.Y. Rangers	3–3–1	3–2–2	—	5–2	1–5–1	3–4	15–16–4
Philadelphia	2–4–1	4–1–2	2–5	—	4–3	1–5–1	13–18–4
Pittsburgh	2–4–1	3–3–1	5–1–1	3–4	—	5–2	18–14–3
Washington	4–3	3–4	4–3	5–1–1	2–5	—	18–16–1

**Vs. Adams Division**

1989–90 NHL records
Team	**BOS**	**BUF**	**HFD**	**MTL**	**QUE**	**Total**
New Jersey	1–1–1	2–1	1–2	1–2	3–0	8–6–1
N.Y. Islanders	1–1–1	3–0	1–2	1–2	1–2	7–7–1
N.Y. Rangers	3–0	0–2–1	2–1	0–3	3–0	8–6–1
Philadelphia	0–3	1–2	1–2	2–0–1	1–1–1	5–8–2
Pittsburgh	1–2	0–3	0–2–1	1–2	2–1	4–10–1
Washington	1–2	1–1–1	1–2	2–1	3–0	8–6–1

==== Vs. Campbell Conference ====
**Vs. Norris Division**

1989–90 NHL records
Team	**CHI**	**DET**	**MIN**	**STL**	**TOR**	**Total**
New Jersey	2–1	1–1–1	1–2	2–1	1–2	7–7–1
N.Y. Islanders	1–2	1–1–1	1–2	1–2	3–0	7–7–1
N.Y. Rangers	1–0–2	2–0–1	1–1–1	0–2–1	1–1–1	5–4–6
Philadelphia	0–3	0–1–2	2–1	2–1	2–1	6–7–2
Pittsburgh	0–3	2–0–1	1–1–1	0–3	1–2	4–9–2
Washington	1–2	3–0	3–0	0–2–1	1–2	8–6–1

**Vs. Smythe Division**

1989–90 NHL records
Team	**CGY**	**EDM**	**LAK**	**VAN**	**WIN**	**Total**
New Jersey	0–3	1–0–2	2–1	0–3	1–2	4–9–2
N.Y. Islanders	0–3	0–1–2	2–1	2–1	2–1	6–7–2
N.Y. Rangers	1–2	2–0–1	1–2	3–0	1–1–1	8–5–2
Philadelphia	1–1–1	1–2	3–0	0–1–2	1–2	6–6–3
Pittsburgh	0–2–1	2–1	1–2	1–2	2–0–1	6–7–2
Washington	1–0–2	1–2	0–3	0–2–1	0–3	2–10–3

== Schedule and results ==
1989–90 regular season
October

Game	Result	Date	Score	Opponent	Record
1	L	October 5, 1989	5–6	@ Minnesota North Stars (1989–90)	0–1–0
2	L	October 7, 1989	3–6	@ Calgary Flames (1989–90)	0–2–0
3	W	October 9, 1989	5–2	@ Vancouver Canucks (1989–90)	1–2–0
4	W	October 11, 1989	7–4	@ Los Angeles Kings (1989–90)	2–2–0
5	T	October 14, 1989	3–3 OT	Philadelphia Flyers (1989–90)	2–2–1
6	L	October 17, 1989	3–6	Minnesota North Stars (1989–90)	2–3–1
7	W	October 20, 1989	5–3	@ Washington Capitals (1989–90)	3–3–1
8	L	October 21, 1989	1–2	Vancouver Canucks (1989–90)	3–4–1
9	T	October 24, 1989	3–3 OT	Edmonton Oilers (1989–90)	3–4–2
10	T	October 27, 1989	5–5 OT	@ New York Rangers (1989–90)	3–4–3
11	L	October 28, 1989	1–4	New York Rangers (1989–90)	3–5–3
12	L	October 31, 1989	0–3	Montreal Canadiens (1989–90)	3–6–3

November

Game	Result	Date	Score	Opponent	Record
13	L	November 2, 1989	2–5	@ Pittsburgh Penguins (1989–90)	3–7–3
14	W	November 4, 1989	3–2	Detroit Red Wings (1989–90)	4–7–3
15	L	November 5, 1989	2–3	@ Philadelphia Flyers (1989–90)	4–8–3
16	L	November 7, 1989	3–5	Washington Capitals (1989–90)	4–9–3
17	L	November 9, 1989	5–7	Quebec Nordiques (1989–90)	4–10–3
18	L	November 11, 1989	3–5	Chicago Blackhawks (1989–90)	4–11–3
19	L	November 12, 1989	2–4	@ New York Rangers (1989–90)	4–12–3
20	L	November 14, 1989	4–5	Philadelphia Flyers (1989–90)	4–13–3
21	W	November 16, 1989	6–2	Toronto Maple Leafs (1989–90)	5–13–3
22	L	November 18, 1989	3–5	@ Pittsburgh Penguins (1989–90)	5–14–3
23	L	November 21, 1989	3–4	Winnipeg Jets (1989–90)	5–15–3
24	L	November 22, 1989	3–5	@ Washington Capitals (1989–90)	5–16–3
25	L	November 25, 1989	2–7	Edmonton Oilers (1989–90)	5–17–3
26	L	November 28, 1989	2–3 OT	@ New Jersey Devils (1989–90)	5–18–3
27	W	November 30, 1989	2–0	@ Chicago Blackhawks (1989–90)	6–18–3

December

Game	Result	Date	Score	Opponent	Record
28	W	December 2, 1989	6–3	@ Winnipeg Jets (1989–90)	7–18–3
29	W	December 5, 1989	3–0	Buffalo Sabres (1989–90)	8–18–3
30	W	December 6, 1989	4–3	@ Hartford Whalers (1989–90)	9–18–3
31	T	December 9, 1989	0–0 OT	New York Rangers (1989–90)	9–18–4
32	L	December 12, 1989	2–7	New Jersey Devils (1989–90)	9–19–4
33	L	December 13, 1989	2–5	@ New Jersey Devils (1989–90)	9–20–4
34	W	December 15, 1989	5–3	@ Washington Capitals (1989–90)	10–20–4
35	W	December 16, 1989	4–3	New York Rangers (1989–90)	11–20–4
36	W	December 19, 1989	5–4 OT	New Jersey Devils (1989–90)	12–20–4
37	W	December 23, 1989	8–6	Pittsburgh Penguins (1989–90)	13–20–4
38	W	December 28, 1989	3–2	St. Louis Blues (1989–90)	14–20–4
39	L	December 30, 1989	3–6	@ Quebec Nordiques (1989–90)	14–21–4
40	W	December 31, 1989	4–2	@ Buffalo Sabres (1989–90)	15–21–4

January

Game	Result	Date	Score	Opponent	Record
41	W	January 2, 1990	5–3	Los Angeles Kings (1989–90)	16–21–4
42	W	January 6, 1990	5–2	Quebec Nordiques (1989–90)	17–21–4
43	W	January 10, 1990	3–1	@ Toronto Maple Leafs (1989–90)	18–21–4
44	W	January 11, 1990	8–4	@ Minnesota North Stars (1989–90)	19–21–4
45	W	January 13, 1990	4–2	Washington Capitals (1989–90)	20–21–4
46	W	January 16, 1990	3–0	Vancouver Canucks (1989–90)	21–21–4
47	W	January 17, 1990	6–3	@ Montreal Canadiens (1989–90)	22–21–4
48	W	January 19, 1990	6–4	@ Winnipeg Jets (1989–90)	23–21–4
49	L	January 23, 1990	2–4	@ Hartford Whalers (1989–90)	23–22–4
50	L	January 25, 1990	2–5	@ Boston Bruins (1989–90)	23–23–4
51	W	January 27, 1990	9–3	Pittsburgh Penguins (1989–90)	24–23–4
52	T	January 28, 1990	4–4 OT	New Jersey Devils (1989–90)	24–23–5
53	L	January 30, 1990	1–2	St. Louis Blues (1989–90)	24–24–5

February

Game	Result	Date	Score	Opponent	Record
54	W	February 2, 1990	5–3	Washington Capitals (1989–90)	25–24–5
55	W	February 4, 1990	1–0	@ Buffalo Sabres (1989–90)	26–24–5
56	W	February 6, 1990	8–7 OT	@ Pittsburgh Penguins (1989–90)	27–24–5
57	T	February 8, 1990	5–5 OT	@ Philadelphia Flyers (1989–90)	27–24–6
58	W	February 10, 1990	4–3 OT	@ Boston Bruins (1989–90)	28–24–6
59	L	February 13, 1990	2–4	Calgary Flames (1989–90)	28–25–6
60	L	February 17, 1990	1–3	Chicago Blackhawks (1989–90)	28–26–6
61	L	February 18, 1990	2–3	@ Philadelphia Flyers (1989–90)	28–27–6
62	L	February 22, 1990	3–4 OT	@ Pittsburgh Penguins (1989–90)	28–28–6
63	T	February 24, 1990	3–3 OT	Detroit Red Wings (1989–90)	28–28–7
64	T	February 25, 1990	3–3 OT	New Jersey Devils (1989–90)	28–28–8
65	L	February 28, 1990	3–4	@ Detroit Red Wings (1989–90)	28–29–8

March

Game	Result	Date	Score	Opponent	Record
66	L	March 2, 1990	3–6	@ New York Rangers (1989–90)	28–30–8
67	L	March 3, 1990	4–5	@ St. Louis Blues (1989–90)	28–31–8
68	L	March 6, 1990	2–4	Hartford Whalers (1989–90)	28–32–8
69	L	March 8, 1990	2–4	@ New Jersey Devils (1989–90)	28–33–8
70	T	March 10, 1990	3–3 OT	Boston Bruins (1989–90)	28–33–9
71	L	March 13, 1990	2–4	Montreal Canadiens (1989–90)	28–34–9
72	L	March 15, 1990	4–5	@ Philadelphia Flyers (1989–90)	28–35–9
73	W	March 17, 1990	6–3	New York Rangers (1989–90)	29–35–9
74	T	March 18, 1990	2–2 OT	Pittsburgh Penguins (1989–90)	29–35–10
75	L	March 20, 1990	0–3	@ Washington Capitals (1989–90)	29–36–10
76	L	March 22, 1990	1–3	@ Los Angeles Kings (1989–90)	29–37–10
77	T	March 24, 1990	5–5 OT	@ Edmonton Oilers (1989–90)	29–37–11
78	L	March 27, 1990	2–4	Calgary Flames (1989–90)	29–38–11
79	W	March 28, 1990	6–3	@ Toronto Maple Leafs (1989–90)	30–38–11
80	W	March 31, 1990	6–2	Philadelphia Flyers (1989–90)	31–38–11

Legend: Win (2 points) Loss (0 points) Tie (1 point)

== Playoffs ==
1990 Stanley Cup playoffs
Division Semifinals vs. (P1) New York Rangers – Rangers win 4–1

Game	Date	Visitor	Score	Home	OT	Series
1	April 5	NY Islanders	1–2	NY Rangers		0–1
2	April 7	NY Islanders	2–5	NY Rangers		0–2
3	April 9	NY Rangers	3–4	NY Islanders	2OT	1–2
4	April 11	NY Rangers	6–1	NY Islanders		1–3
5	April 13	NY Islanders	5–6	NY Rangers		1–4

Legend: Win Loss

== Player statistics ==
Regular season
Scoring

Player	Pos	GP	G	A	Pts	PIM	+/-	PPG	SHG	GWG
Pat LaFontaine	C	74	54	51	105	38	-13	13	2	8
Brent Sutter	C	67	33	35	68	65	9	17	3	3
Doug Crossman	D	80	15	44	59	54	3	8	0	1
Jeff Norton	D	60	4	49	53	65	-9	4	0	0
Pat Flatley	RW	62	17	32	49	101	10	4	0	2
Randy Wood	LW/C	74	24	24	48	39	-10	6	1	3
Don Maloney	LW	79	16	27	43	47	6	0	1	2
Derek King	LW	46	13	27	40	20	2	5	0	1
David Volek	W	80	17	22	39	41	-2	6	0	0
Alan Kerr	RW	75	15	21	36	129	-1	3	0	1
Hubie McDonough	C	54	18	11	29	26	10	0	3	3
Gary Nylund	D	64	4	21	25	144	8	2	0	0
Bryan Trottier	C	59	13	11	24	29	-11	4	0	0
Brad Lauer	LW	63	6	18	24	19	5	0	0	2
Gerald Diduck	D	76	3	17	20	163	2	1	0	0
Dave Chyzowski	LW	34	8	6	14	45	-4	3	0	1
Mick Vukota	RW	76	4	8	12	290	10	0	0	0
Joe Reekie	D	31	1	8	9	43	13	0	0	1
Gilles Thibaudeau	C	20	4	4	8	17	2	0	0	0
Jari Gronstrand	D	41	3	4	7	27	0	0	0	2
Tom Fitzgerald	RW	19	2	5	7	4	-3	0	0	1
Mikko Makela	RW	20	2	3	5	2	-10	1	0	0
Ken Baumgartner	LW	53	0	5	5	194	6	0	0	0
Derek Laxdal	RW	12	3	1	4	4	-4	0	0	0
Marc Bergevin	D	18	0	4	4	30	-8	0	0	0
Dean Chynoweth	D	20	0	2	2	39	0	0	0	0
Mark Fitzpatrick	G	47	0	2	2	18	0	0	0	0
Dale Henry	LW	20	0	2	2	2	-4	0	0	0
Rich Pilon	D	14	0	2	2	31	2	0	0	0
Shawn Evans	D	2	1	0	1	0	-1	1	0	0
Paul Gagne	LW	9	1	0	1	4	-1	0	0	0
Jeff Finley	D	11	0	1	1	0	0	0	0	0
Glenn Healy	G	39	0	1	1	7	0	0	0	0
Wayne McBean	D	5	0	1	1	2	-1	0	0	0
Rob DiMaio	RW	7	0	0	0	2	0	0	0	0
Dale Kushner	RW	2	0	0	0	2	0	0	0	0
Chris Pryor	D	10	0	0	0	24	-7	0	0	0

Goaltending

Player	MIN	GP	W	L	T	GA	GAA	SO	SA	SV	SV%
Mark Fitzpatrick	2653	47	19	19	5	150	3.39	3	1472	1322	.898
Glenn Healy	2197	39	12	19	6	128	3.50	2	1210	1082	.894
Team:	4850	80	31	38	11	278	3.44	5	2682	2404	.896

Playoffs
Scoring

Player	Pos	GP	G	A	Pts	PIM	+/-	PPG	SHG	GWG
Brent Sutter	C	5	2	3	5	2	0	2	0	1
David Volek	W	5	1	4	5	0	-3	0	0	0
Jeff Norton	D	4	1	3	4	17	0	0	0	0
Pat Flatley	RW	5	3	0	3	2	1	2	0	0
Wayne McBean	D	2	1	1	2	0	0	0	0	0
Randy Wood	LW/C	5	1	1	2	4	-2	0	0	0
Jeff Finley	D	5	0	2	2	2	-3	0	0	0
Brad Lauer	LW	4	0	2	2	10	4	0	0	0
Derek Laxdal	RW	1	0	2	2	2	2	0	0	0
Gary Nylund	D	5	0	2	2	17	1	0	0	0
Rob DiMaio	RW	1	1	0	1	4	2	0	0	0
Tom Fitzgerald	RW	4	1	0	1	4	0	0	0	0
Hubie McDonough	C	5	1	0	1	4	-2	0	0	0
Bryan Trottier	C	4	1	0	1	4	-4	0	0	0
Doug Crossman	D	5	0	1	1	6	1	0	0	0
Rod Dallman	LW	1	0	1	1	0	1	0	0	0
Glenn Healy	G	4	0	1	1	0	0	0	0	0
Pat LaFontaine	C	2	0	1	1	0	-1	0	0	0
Ken Baumgartner	LW	4	0	0	0	27	1	0	0	0
Marc Bergevin	D	1	0	0	0	2	0	0	0	0
Gerald Diduck	D	5	0	0	0	12	-5	0	0	0
Mark Fitzpatrick	G	4	0	0	0	19	0	0	0	0
Jari Gronstrand	D	3	0	0	0	4	0	0	0	0
Alan Kerr	RW	4	0	0	0	10	-3	0	0	0
Derek King	LW	4	0	0	0	4	-3	0	0	0
Don Maloney	LW	5	0	0	0	2	-1	0	0	0
Mick Vukota	RW	1	0	0	0	17	0	0	0	0

Goaltending

Player	MIN	GP	W	L	GA	GAA	SO	SA	SV	SV%
Glenn Healy	166	4	1	2	9	3.25	0	79	70	.886
Mark Fitzpatrick	152	4	0	2	13	5.13	0	71	58	.817
Team:	318	5	1	4	22	4.15	0	150	128	.853

Note: Pos = Position; GP = Games played; G = Goals; A = Assists; Pts = Points; +/- = plus/minus; PIM = Penalty minutes; PPG = Power-play goals; SHG = Short-handed goals; GWG = Game-winning goals
MIN = Minutes played; W = Wins; L = Losses; T = Ties; GA = Goals-against; GAA = Goals-against average; SO = Shutouts; SA = Shots against; SV = Shots saved; SV% = Save percentage;

== Draft picks ==
New York's draft picks at the 1989 NHL entry draft held at the Met Center in Bloomington, Minnesota.

Round	#	Player	Nationality	College/Junior/Club team (League)
1	2	Dave Chyzowski	Canada	Kamloops Blazers (WHL)
2	23	Travis Green	Canada	Spokane Chiefs (WHL)
3	44	Jason Zent	United States	Nichols School (USHS-NY)
4	65	Brent Grieve	Canada	Oshawa Generals (OHL)
5	86	Jace Reed	United States	Grand Rapids High School (USHS-MN)
5	90	Steve Young	Canada	Moose Jaw Warriors (WHL)
5	99	Kevin O'Sullivan	United States	Catholic Memorial School (USHS-MN)
7	128	Jon Larson	United States	Roseau High School (USHS-MN)
7	133	Brett Harkins	United States	Detroit Compuware Ambassadors (OHL)
8	149	Phil Huber	Canada	Kamloops Blazers (WHL)
9	170	Matthew Robbins	United States	New Hampton School (USHS-NH)
10	191	Vladimir Malakhov	Soviet Union	CSKA Moscow (Soviet Union)
11	212	Kelly Ens	Canada	Lethbridge Hurricanes (WHL)
12	233	Iain Fraser	Canada	Oshawa Generals (OHL)
S	2	Rob Vanderydt	Canada	Miami University (CCHA)
S	7	Brad Mattson	United States	Saint Mary's University of Minnesota (MIAC)

== See also ==
- 1989–90 NHL season
