= 1989–90 New York Rangers season =

NHL hockey team season

1989–90 New York Rangers
- Patrick Division champions
- Division: 1st Patrick
- Conference: T-4th Wales
- 1989–90 record: 36–31–13
- Home record: 20–11–9
- Road record: 16–20–4
- Goals for: 279
- Goals against: 267

Team information
- General manager: Neil Smith
- Coach: Roger Neilson
- Captain: Kelly Kisio
- Arena: Madison Square Garden

Team leaders
- Goals: John Ogrodnick (43)
- Assists: Brian Leetch (45)
- Points: John Ogrodnick (74)
- Penalty minutes: Troy Mallette (305)
- Wins: John Vanbiesbrouck (19)
- Goals against average: Mike Richter (3.00)

The 1989–90 New York Rangers season was the franchise's 64th season. During the regular season, the Rangers led the Patrick Division with 85 points and qualified for the NHL playoffs. In the first round of the playoffs, the Rangers defeated the New York Islanders four games to one and earned a berth in the Patrick Division Finals. There, New York lost to the Washington Capitals in five games.

== Offseason ==
During the offseason, Gulf+Western, owners of the Rangers, and all MSG properties since 1977, changed their name to Paramount Communications. The new name was chosen in honor of the company's leading subsidiary, the Paramount Pictures film studio.

== Regular season ==
The Rangers finished the regular season with the most power-play opportunities (442) and the most power-play goals scored (103).

=== Final standings ===
Patrick Division
	GP	W	L	T	GF	GA	Pts
**New York Rangers**	80	36	31	13	279	267	85
**New Jersey Devils**	80	37	34	9	295	288	83
**Washington Capitals**	80	36	38	6	284	275	78
**New York Islanders**	80	31	38	11	281	288	73
Pittsburgh Penguins	80	32	40	8	318	359	72
Philadelphia Flyers	80	30	39	11	290	297	71

Note: GP = Games played, W = Wins, L = Losses, T = Ties, Pts = Points, GF = Goals for, GA = Goals against
Note: Teams that qualified for the playoffs are highlighted in bold.

Wales Conference
R		Div	GP	W	L	T	GF	GA	Pts
**1**	**p – Boston Bruins**	**ADM**	**80**	**46**	**25**	**9**	**289**	**232**	**101**
**2**	**Buffalo Sabres**	**ADM**	**80**	**45**	**27**	**8**	**286**	**248**	**98**
**3**	**Montreal Canadiens**	**ADM**	**80**	**41**	**28**	**11**	**288**	**234**	**93**
**4**	**Hartford Whalers**	**ADM**	**80**	**38**	**33**	**9**	**275**	**268**	**85**
**5**	**New York Rangers**	**PTK**	**80**	**36**	**31**	**13**	**279**	**267**	**85**
**6**	**New Jersey Devils**	**PTK**	**80**	**37**	**34**	**9**	**295**	**288**	**83**
**7**	**Washington Capitals**	**PTK**	**80**	**36**	**38**	**6**	**284**	**275**	**78**
**8**	**New York Islanders**	**PTK**	**80**	**31**	**38**	**11**	**281**	**288**	**73**
9	Pittsburgh Penguins	PTK	80	32	40	8	318	359	72
10	Philadelphia Flyers	PTK	80	30	39	11	290	297	71
11	Quebec Nordiques	ADM	80	12	61	7	240	407	31

Divisions: PTK – Patrick, ADM – Adams

bold – Qualified for playoffs; p – Won Presidents' Trophy

=== Record vs. opponents ===
==== Vs. Wales Conference ====
**Vs. Patrick Division**

1989–90 NHL records
Team	**NJD**	**NYI**	**NYR**	**PHI**	**PIT**	**WSH**	**Total**
New Jersey	—	4–1–2	3–3–1	4–2–1	4–2–1	3–4	18–12–5
N.Y. Islanders	1–4–2	—	2–3–2	1–4–2	3–3–1	4–3	11–17–7
N.Y. Rangers	3–3–1	3–2–2	—	5–2	1–5–1	3–4	15–16–4
Philadelphia	2–4–1	4–1–2	2–5	—	4–3	1–5–1	13–18–4
Pittsburgh	2–4–1	3–3–1	5–1–1	3–4	—	5–2	18–14–3
Washington	4–3	3–4	4–3	5–1–1	2–5	—	18–16–1

**Vs. Adams Division**

1989–90 NHL records
Team	**BOS**	**BUF**	**HFD**	**MTL**	**QUE**	**Total**
New Jersey	1–1–1	2–1	1–2	1–2	3–0	8–6–1
N.Y. Islanders	1–1–1	3–0	1–2	1–2	1–2	7–7–1
N.Y. Rangers	3–0	0–2–1	2–1	0–3	3–0	8–6–1
Philadelphia	0–3	1–2	1–2	2–0–1	1–1–1	5–8–2
Pittsburgh	1–2	0–3	0–2–1	1–2	2–1	4–10–1
Washington	1–2	1–1–1	1–2	2–1	3–0	8–6–1

==== Vs. Campbell Conference ====
**Vs. Norris Division**

1989–90 NHL records
Team	**CHI**	**DET**	**MIN**	**STL**	**TOR**	**Total**
New Jersey	2–1	1–1–1	1–2	2–1	1–2	7–7–1
N.Y. Islanders	1–2	1–1–1	1–2	1–2	3–0	7–7–1
N.Y. Rangers	1–0–2	2–0–1	1–1–1	0–2–1	1–1–1	5–4–6
Philadelphia	0–3	0–1–2	2–1	2–1	2–1	6–7–2
Pittsburgh	0–3	2–0–1	1–1–1	0–3	1–2	4–9–2
Washington	1–2	3–0	3–0	0–2–1	1–2	8–6–1

**Vs. Smythe Division**

1989–90 NHL records
Team	**CGY**	**EDM**	**LAK**	**VAN**	**WIN**	**Total**
New Jersey	0–3	1–0–2	2–1	0–3	1–2	4–9–2
N.Y. Islanders	0–3	0–1–2	2–1	2–1	2–1	6–7–2
N.Y. Rangers	1–2	2–0–1	1–2	3–0	1–1–1	8–5–2
Philadelphia	1–1–1	1–2	3–0	0–1–2	1–2	6–6–3
Pittsburgh	0–2–1	2–1	1–2	1–2	2–0–1	6–7–2
Washington	1–0–2	1–2	0–3	0–2–1	0–3	2–10–3

== Schedule and results ==
1989–90 regular season
October: 8–2–3 (home: 4–1–3; road: 4–1–0)

Game	Date	Time (ET)	Opponent	Score	OT	Decision	Location	Attendance	Record	Points	Recap
1	October 6		@ Winnipeg	4–1					1–0–0	2	
2	October 8		@ Chicago	5–3					2–0–0	4	
3	October 11		Calgary	5–4					3–0–0	6	
4	October 13		@ Washington	4–7					3–1–0	6	
5	October 15		Pittsburgh	4–2					4–1–0	8	
6	October 17		Chicago	3–3	OT				4–1–1	9	
7	October 19		Hartford	7–3					5–1–1	11	
8	October 21		@ Philadelphia	3–1					6–1–1	13	
9	October 23		Vancouver	5–3					7–1–1	15	
10	October 25	7:35 p.m. EDT	Edmonton	3–3	OT	Froese	Madison Square Garden	15,501	7–1–2	16	
11	October 27		N.Y. Islanders	5–5	OT				7–1–3	17	
12	October 28		@ N.Y. Islanders	4–1					8–1–3	19	
13	October 30		Philadelphia	1–3					8–2–3	19	

November: 5–7–1 (home: 4–1–1; road: 1–6–0)

Game	Date	Time (ET)	Opponent	Score	OT	Decision	Location	Attendance	Record	Points	Recap
14	November 2		Quebec	6–1					9–2–3	21	
15	November 4		@ Montreal	2–3					9–3–3	21	
16	November 6		Detroit	6–1					10–3–3	23	
17	November 8		Montreal	2–3					10–4–3	23	
18	November 12		N.Y. Islanders	4–2					11–4–3	25	
19	November 14		@ Pittsburgh	0–6					11–5–3	25	
20	November 17		@ New Jersey	4–5	OT				11–6–3	25	
21	November 18		@ Hartford	3–2					12–6–3	27	
22	November 20		Winnipeg	3–3	OT				12–6–4	28	
23	November 22		@ Buffalo	1–4					12–7–4	28	
24	November 25		@ Toronto	4–7					12–8–4	28	
25	November 26		Quebec	3–1					13–8–4	30	
26	November 29		@ Winnipeg	4–5					13–9–4	30	

December: 2–9–3 (home: 1–4–2; road: 1–5–1)

Game	Date	Time (ET)	Opponent	Score	OT	Decision	Location	Attendance	Record	Points	Recap
27	December 1		@ Vancouver	4–3					14–9–4	32	
28	December 2		@ Los Angeles	0–6					14–10–4	32	
29	December 6		New Jersey	5–3					15–10–4	34	
30	December 9		@ N.Y. Islanders	0–0	OT				15–10–5	35	
31	December 10		Philadelphia	2–4					15–11–5	35	
32	December 13		St. Louis	1–3					15–12–5	35	
33	December 16		@ N.Y. Islanders	3–4					15–13–5	35	
34	December 17		Montreal	0–2					15–14–5	35	
35	December 20		Buffalo	2–2	OT				15–14–6	36	
36	December 23		@ Washington	2–3					15–15–6	36	
37	December 26		New Jersey	4–4	OT				15–15–7	37	
38	December 27		@ Pittsburgh	4–7					15–16–7	37	
39	December 29		@ New Jersey	2–3					15–17–7	37	
40	December 31		Pittsburgh	4–5					15–18–7	37	

January: 5–4–3 (home: 2–1–2; road: 3–3–1)

Game	Date	Time (ET)	Opponent	Score	OT	Decision	Location	Attendance	Record	Points	Recap
41	January 3		Washington	2–1					16–18–7	39	
42	January 4		@ Minnesota	2–8					16–19–7	39	
43	January 6		@ St. Louis	3–4					16–20–7	39	
44	January 8		Pittsburgh	5–7					16–21–7	39	
45	January 10		Chicago	2–2	OT				16–21–8	40	
46	January 13		@ Boston	3–2					17–21–8	42	
47	January 14		Philadelphia	4–3	OT				18–21–8	43	
48	January 18		@ Pittsburgh	3–3	OT				18–21–9	44	
49	January 23	9:35 p.m. EST	@ Edmonton	4–3		Richter	Northlands Coliseum	17,101	19–21–9	46	
50	January 25		@ Calgary	5–8					19–22–9	46	
51	January 27		@ Los Angeles	3–1					20–22–9	48	
52	January 31		St. Louis	2–2	OT				20–22–10	49	

February: 9–3–1 (home: 5–2–0; road: 4–1–1)

Game	Date	Time (ET)	Opponent	Score	OT	Decision	Location	Attendance	Record	Points	Recap
53	February 3		@ Boston	2–1					21–22–10	51	
54	February 4		Minnesota	4–3					22–22–10	53	
55	February 7	7:35 p.m. EST	Edmonton	5–2		Vanbiesbrouck	Madison Square Garden	16,227	23–22–10	55	
56	February 9		@ Buffalo	2–3					23–23–10	55	
57	February 11		Calgary	2–5					23–24–10	55	
58	February 13		@ Philadelphia	4–3					24–24–10	57	
59	February 14		Pittsburgh	3–4	OT				24–25–10	57	
60	February 16		@ New Jersey	2–1					25–25–10	59	
61	February 19		New Jersey	4–3	OT				26–25–10	61	
62	February 21		@ Detroit	4–4	OT				26–25–11	62	
63	February 23		@ Washington	6–3					27–25–11	64	
64	February 26		Boston	6–1					28–25–11	66	
65	February 28		Washington	3–2					29–25–11	68	

March: 7–5–2 (home: 4–1–1; road: 3–4–1)

Game	Date	Time (ET)	Opponent	Score	OT	Decision	Location	Attendance	Record	Points	Recap
66	March 2		N.Y. Islanders	6–3					30–25–11	70	
67	March 3		@ Hartford	4–6					30–26–11	70	
68	March 5		Detroit	3–2					31–26–11	72	
69	March 8		@ Philadelphia	7–5					32–26–11	74	
70	March 10		@ Minnesota	2–2	OT				32–26–12	75	
71	March 12		Los Angeles	2–6					32–27–12	75	
72	March 14		@ Toronto	8–2					33–27–12	77	
73	March 17		@ N.Y. Islanders	3–6					33–28–12	77	
74	March 18		Vancouver	5–2					34–28–12	79	
75	March 21		Toronto	5–5	OT				34–28–13	80	
76	March 25		Philadelphia	7–3					35–28–13	82	
77	March 27		@ Quebec	7–4					36–28–13	84	
78	March 29		@ New Jersey	4–6					36–29–13	84	
79	March 31		@ Washington	1–2					36–30–13	84	

April: 0–1–0 (home: 0–1–0; road: 0–0–0)

Game	Date	Time (ET)	Opponent	Score	OT	Decision	Location	Attendance	Record	Points	Recap
80	April 1		Washington	2–3					36–31–13	84	

Legend: Win (2 points) Loss (0 points) Tie (1 point)

== Playoffs ==
1990 Stanley Cup playoffs
Division semifinals vs. (P4) New York Islanders – N.Y. Rangers win 4–1

Game	Date	Visitor	Score	Home	OT	Attendance	Series
1	April 5	N.Y. Islanders	1–2	N.Y. Rangers		16,651	Rangers lead series 1–0
2	April 7	N.Y. Islanders	2–5	N.Y. Rangers		16,651	Rangers lead series 2–0
3	April 9	N.Y. Rangers	3–4	N.Y. Islanders	2OT	16,297	Rangers lead series 2–1
4	April 11	N.Y. Rangers	6–1	N.Y. Islanders		16,297	Rangers lead series 3–1
5	April 13	N.Y. Islanders	5–6	N.Y. Rangers		16,651	Rangers win series 4–1

Division Finals vs. (P3) Washington Capitals – Washington wins 4–1

Game	Date	Visitor	Score	Home	OT	Attendance	Series
1	April 19	Washington	3–7	N.Y. Rangers		16,651	Rangers lead series 1–0
2	April 21	Washington	6–3	N.Y. Rangers		16,651	Series tied 1–1
3	April 23	N.Y. Rangers	1–7	Washington		18,011	Washington leads series 2–1
4	April 25	N.Y. Rangers	3–4	Washington	OT	18,130	Washington leads series 3–1
5	April 27	Washington	2–1	N.Y. Rangers	OT	16,651	Washington wins series 4–1

Legend: Win Loss

== Player statistics ==
Skaters

Regular season
Player	GP	G	A	Pts	+/-	PIM
John Ogrodnick	80	43	31	74	11	44
Brian Mullen	76	27	41	68	7	42
Darren Turcotte	76	32	34	66	3	32
Kelly Kisio	68	22	44	66	11	105
James Patrick	73	14	43	57	4	50
Brian Leetch	72	11	45	56	−18	26
Tomas Sandstrom^{‡}	48	19	19	38	−10	100
Bernie Nicholls^{†}	32	12	25	37	−3	20
Ulf Dahlen^{‡}	63	18	18	36	−4	30
Troy Mallette	79	13	16	29	−8	305
Carey Wilson	41	9	17	26	4	57
Tony Granato^{‡}	37	7	18	25	1	77
Mike Gartner^{†}	12	11	5	16	4	6
Mark Hardy	54	0	15	15	4	94
Miloslav Horava	45	4	10	14	10	26
Kris King	68	6	7	13	2	286
Mark Janssens	80	5	8	13	−26	161
Jan Erixon	58	4	9	13	−17	8
Randy Moller	60	1	12	13	−1	139
David Shaw	22	2	10	12	−3	22
Ron Greschner	55	1	9	10	−7	53
Lindy Ruff	56	3	6	9	−10	80
Paul Broten	32	5	3	8	−4	26
Jeff Bloemberg	28	3	3	6	−8	25
Dave Archibald^{†}	19	2	3	5	0	6
Kevin Miller	16	0	5	5	−1	2
Normand Rochefort	31	3	1	4	2	24
Chris Nilan	25	1	2	3	−8	59
Rick Bennett	6	1	0	1	−4	5
Corey Millen	4	0	0	0	−2	2
Todd Charlesworth	7	0	0	0	−3	6
Rudy Poeschek	15	0	0	0	−1	55

Playoffs
Player	GP	G	A	Pts	PIM
Bernie Nicholls	10	7	5	12	16
James Patrick	10	3	8	11	0
Kelly Kisio	10	2	8	10	8
John Ogrodnick	10	6	3	9	0
Mike Gartner	10	5	3	8	12
Randy Moller	10	1	6	7	32
Darren Turcotte	10	1	6	7	4
Troy Mallette	10	2	2	4	81
Brian Mullen	10	2	2	4	8
Normand Rochefort	10	2	1	3	26
Jeff Bloemberg	7	0	3	3	5
Lindy Ruff	8	0	3	3	12
Mark Janssens	9	2	1	3	10
Carey Wilson	10	2	1	3	0
Paul Broten	6	1	1	2	2
Chris Nilan	4	0	1	1	19
Jan Erixon	10	1	0	1	2
Kris King	10	0	1	1	30
Miloslav Horava	2	0	1	1	0
Mark Hardy	3	0	1	1	2
Kevin Miller	1	0	0	0	0
Ron Greschner	10	0	0	0	16

Goaltenders

Regular season
Player	GP	TOI	W	L	T	GA	GAA	SA	SV%	SO
John Vanbiesbrouck	47	2734	19	19	7	154	3.38	1362	.887	1
Mike Richter	23	1320	12	5	5	66	3.00	686	.904	0
Bob Froese	15	812	5	7	1	45	3.33	355	.873	0

Playoffs
Player	GP	TOI	W	L	GA	GAA	SA	SV%	SO
Mike Richter	6	330	3	2	19	3.45	181	.895	0
John Vanbiesbrouck	6	298	2	3	15	3.02	153	.902	0

^{†}Denotes player spent time with another team before joining Rangers. Stats reflect time with Rangers only.
^{‡}Traded mid-season. Stats reflect time with Rangers only.

Note:

Pos = Position;GP = Games played; G = Goals; A = Assists; Pts = Points; PIM = Penalty minutes; +/- = Plus/minus; PPG = Power-play goals; SHG = Short-handed goals; GWG = Game-winning goals
Pos = Position;GP = Games played; Min, TOI = Minutes played; W = Wins; L = Losses; T,T/OT = Ties; OTL = Overtime losses; GA = Goals-against; GAA = Goals-against average; SO = Shutouts; SA = Shots against; SV = Shots saved;SV% = Save percentage;

== Transactions ==
- September 1, 1989: the Rangers traded Barry Beck to the Los Angeles Kings for future considerations.
- September 7, 1989: the Rangers traded Chris McRae and a 5th round draft pick in 1990 to the Detroit Red Wings for Kris King.
- September 14, 1989: the Rangers acquired Lee Giffin from the Pittsburgh Penguins for future considerations.
- October 5, 1989: the Rangers traded Michel Petit to the Quebec Nordiques for Randy Moller.
- November 1, 1989: the Rangers traded Jayson More to the Minnesota North Stars for Dave Archibald.
- January 20, 1990: the Rangers traded Tomas Sandstrom and Tony Granato to the Los Angeles Kings for Bernie Nicholls.
- March 6, 1990: the Rangers traded Ulf Dahlen, a 4th round draft pick in 1990, and future considerations (a 4th round draft pick in 1991) to the Minnesota North Stars for Mike Gartner.

== Draft picks ==
New York's picks at the 1989 NHL entry draft in Bloomington, Minnesota at the Met Center.

Round	#	Player	Position	Nationality	College/Junior/Club team (League)
1	20	Steven Rice	RW	Canada	Kitchener Rangers (OHL)
2	40	Jason Prosofsky	RW	Canada	Medicine Hat Tigers (WHL)
3	45	Rob Zamuner	LW	Canada	Guelph Platers (OHL)
3	49	Louie DeBrusk	LW	Canada	London Knights (OHL)
4	67	Jim Cummins	RW	United States	Michigan State University (NCAA)
5	88	Aaron Miller	D	United States	Niagara Scenics (NAHL)
6	118	Joby Messier	D	Canada	Michigan State University (NCAA)
7	139	Greg Leahy	F	United States	Portland Winter Hawks (WHL)
8	160	Greg Spenrath	D	Canada	Tri-City Americans (WHL)
9	181	Mark Bavis	LW	United States	Cushing Academy (Massachusetts)
10	202	Roman Oksiuta	RW	Soviet Union	Voskresensk Khimik (Russia)
11	223	Steve Locke	D	Canada	Niagara Falls Thunder (OHL)
12	244	Kenneth MacDermid	LW	Canada	Hull Olympiques (QMJHL)

=== Supplemental Draft ===
New York's picks at the 1989 NHL supplemental draft.

Player	Position	Nationality	College/Junior/Club team (League)
Anthony Palumbo	C	Canada	Lake Superior State University (CCHA)
