= 1989–90 Pittsburgh Penguins season =

NHL team season

1989–90 Pittsburgh Penguins
- Division: 5th Patrick
- Conference: 9th Wales
- 1989–90 record: 32–40–8
- Home record: 22–15–3
- Road record: 10–25–5
- Goals for: 318
- Goals against: 359

Team information
- General manager: Craig Patrick
- Coach: Gene Ubriaco; Craig Patrick
- Captain: Mario Lemieux
- Alternate captains: Paul Coffey; John Cullen
- Arena: Pittsburgh Civic Arena

Team leaders
- Goals: Mario Lemieux (45)
- Assists: Mario Lemieux (78)
- Points: Mario Lemieux (123)
- Penalty minutes: Kevin Stevens (171)
- Wins: Wendell Young (16)
- Goals against average: Wendell Young (4.17)

The 1989–90 Pittsburgh Penguins season saw the Penguins looking to improve upon the previous season's performance where they finished second in the Patrick Division and made it to the second round of playoffs where they encountered disappointment falling in seven games despite leading the series three games to two against their cross-state opponents Philadelphia Flyers. Unfortunately, after a back injury that sidelined captain Mario Lemieux for the remainder of the season during a February 14, 1990 4-3 victory over the New York Rangers, the Penguins went 3-3-1 for the remainder of February, and 2-9-3 in March, falling out of playoff contention and missing the playoffs for the first time since the 1987–88 season.

== Regular season ==
The Penguins allowed the most short-handed goals during the regular season, with 21.

=== All-Star Game ===

The 41st National Hockey League All-Star Game was held in Civic Arena in Pittsburgh, home to the Pittsburgh Penguins, on January 21, 1990. The game saw the team of all-stars from the Wales conference defeat the Campbell conference all-stars 12–7. Mario Lemieux was named the game's Most Valuable Player.

=== Season standings ===
Patrick Division
	GP	W	L	T	GF	GA	Pts
**New York Rangers**	80	36	31	13	279	267	85
**New Jersey Devils**	80	37	34	9	295	288	83
**Washington Capitals**	80	36	38	6	284	275	78
**New York Islanders**	80	31	38	11	281	288	73
Pittsburgh Penguins	80	32	40	8	318	359	72
Philadelphia Flyers	80	30	39	11	290	297	71

Note: GP = Games played, W = Wins, L = Losses, T = Ties, Pts = Points, GF = Goals for, GA = Goals against
Note: Teams that qualified for the playoffs are highlighted in bold.

Wales Conference
R		Div	GP	W	L	T	GF	GA	Pts
**1**	**p – Boston Bruins**	**ADM**	**80**	**46**	**25**	**9**	**289**	**232**	**101**
**2**	**Buffalo Sabres**	**ADM**	**80**	**45**	**27**	**8**	**286**	**248**	**98**
**3**	**Montreal Canadiens**	**ADM**	**80**	**41**	**28**	**11**	**288**	**234**	**93**
**4**	**Hartford Whalers**	**ADM**	**80**	**38**	**33**	**9**	**275**	**268**	**85**
**5**	**New York Rangers**	**PTK**	**80**	**36**	**31**	**13**	**279**	**267**	**85**
**6**	**New Jersey Devils**	**PTK**	**80**	**37**	**34**	**9**	**295**	**288**	**83**
**7**	**Washington Capitals**	**PTK**	**80**	**36**	**38**	**6**	**284**	**275**	**78**
**8**	**New York Islanders**	**PTK**	**80**	**31**	**38**	**11**	**281**	**288**	**73**
9	Pittsburgh Penguins	PTK	80	32	40	8	318	359	72
10	Philadelphia Flyers	PTK	80	30	39	11	290	297	71
11	Quebec Nordiques	ADM	80	12	61	7	240	407	31

Divisions: PTK – Patrick, ADM – Adams

bold – Qualified for playoffs; p – Won Presidents' Trophy

=== Record vs. opponents ===
==== Vs. Wales Conference ====
**Vs. Patrick Division**

1989–90 NHL records
Team	**NJD**	**NYI**	**NYR**	**PHI**	**PIT**	**WSH**	**Total**
New Jersey	—	4–1–2	3–3–1	4–2–1	4–2–1	3–4	18–12–5
N.Y. Islanders	1–4–2	—	2–3–2	1–4–2	3–3–1	4–3	11–17–7
N.Y. Rangers	3–3–1	3–2–2	—	5–2	1–5–1	3–4	15–16–4
Philadelphia	2–4–1	4–1–2	2–5	—	4–3	1–5–1	13–18–4
Pittsburgh	2–4–1	3–3–1	5–1–1	3–4	—	5–2	18–14–3
Washington	4–3	3–4	4–3	5–1–1	2–5	—	18–16–1

**Vs. Adams Division**

1989–90 NHL records
Team	**BOS**	**BUF**	**HFD**	**MTL**	**QUE**	**Total**
New Jersey	1–1–1	2–1	1–2	1–2	3–0	8–6–1
N.Y. Islanders	1–1–1	3–0	1–2	1–2	1–2	7–7–1
N.Y. Rangers	3–0	0–2–1	2–1	0–3	3–0	8–6–1
Philadelphia	0–3	1–2	1–2	2–0–1	1–1–1	5–8–2
Pittsburgh	1–2	0–3	0–2–1	1–2	2–1	4–10–1
Washington	1–2	1–1–1	1–2	2–1	3–0	8–6–1

==== Vs. Campbell Conference ====
**Vs. Norris Division**

1989–90 NHL records
Team	**CHI**	**DET**	**MIN**	**STL**	**TOR**	**Total**
New Jersey	2–1	1–1–1	1–2	2–1	1–2	7–7–1
N.Y. Islanders	1–2	1–1–1	1–2	1–2	3–0	7–7–1
N.Y. Rangers	1–0–2	2–0–1	1–1–1	0–2–1	1–1–1	5–4–6
Philadelphia	0–3	0–1–2	2–1	2–1	2–1	6–7–2
Pittsburgh	0–3	2–0–1	1–1–1	0–3	1–2	4–9–2
Washington	1–2	3–0	3–0	0–2–1	1–2	8–6–1

**Vs. Smythe Division**

1989–90 NHL records
Team	**CGY**	**EDM**	**LAK**	**VAN**	**WIN**	**Total**
New Jersey	0–3	1–0–2	2–1	0–3	1–2	4–9–2
N.Y. Islanders	0–3	0–1–2	2–1	2–1	2–1	6–7–2
N.Y. Rangers	1–2	2–0–1	1–2	3–0	1–1–1	8–5–2
Philadelphia	1–1–1	1–2	3–0	0–1–2	1–2	6–6–3
Pittsburgh	0–2–1	2–1	1–2	1–2	2–0–1	6–7–2
Washington	1–0–2	1–2	0–3	0–2–1	0–3	2–10–3

== Schedule and results ==
1989–90 regular season
October: 3–7–2 (home: 3–4–0; road: 0–3–2), 8 points

#	Date	Visitor	Score	Home	Record	Points
1	Oct 5	Pittsburgh Penguins	4–5	Boston Bruins	0–1–0	0
2	Oct 7	Pittsburgh Penguins	4–4	New Jersey Devils	0–1–1	1
3	Oct 10	Winnipeg Jets	1–5	Pittsburgh Penguins	1–1–1	3
4	Oct 14	Montreal Canadiens	1–2	Pittsburgh Penguins	2–1–1	5
5	Oct 15	Pittsburgh Penguins	2–4	New York Rangers	2–2–1	5
6	Oct 17	Toronto Maple Leafs	5–7	Pittsburgh Penguins	3–2–1	7
7	Oct 18	St. Louis Blues	9–3	Pittsburgh Penguins	3–3–1	7
8	Oct 21	Buffalo Sabres	4–2	Pittsburgh Penguins	3–4–1	7
9	Oct 25	Toronto Maple Leafs	8–6	Pittsburgh Penguins	3–5–1	7
10	Oct 26	Pittsburgh Penguins	3–3	Detroit Red Wings	3–5–2	8
11	Oct 28	Pittsburgh Penguins	1–5	Montreal Canadiens	3–6–2	8
12	Oct 31	Los Angeles Kings	8–4	Pittsburgh Penguins	3–7–2	8

November: 6–7–0 (home: 4–3–0; road: 2–4–0), 12 points

#	Date	Visitor	Score	Home	Record	Points
13	Nov 2	New York Islanders	2–5	Pittsburgh Penguins	4–7–2	10
14	Nov 4	Pittsburgh Penguins	3–1	Edmonton Oilers	5–7–2	12
15	Nov 5	Pittsburgh Penguins	3–5	Vancouver Canucks	5–8–2	12
16	Nov 9	Pittsburgh Penguins	3–4	Chicago Blackhawks	5–9–2	12
17	Nov 11	Pittsburgh Penguins	3–8	St. Louis Blues	5–10–2	12
18	Nov 14	New York Rangers	0–6	Pittsburgh Penguins	6–10–2	14
19	Nov 16	Quebec Nordiques	2–8	Pittsburgh Penguins	7–10–2	16
20	Nov 18	New York Islanders	3–5	Pittsburgh Penguins	8–10–2	18
21	Nov 22	New Jersey Devils	6–3	Pittsburgh Penguins	8–11–2	18
22	Nov 24	Pittsburgh Penguins	7–4	Washington Capitals	9–11–2	20
23	Nov 25	Washington Capitals	4–1	Pittsburgh Penguins	9–12–2	20
24	Nov 28	Philadelphia Flyers	6–3	Pittsburgh Penguins	9–13–2	20
25	Nov 30	Pittsburgh Penguins	1–4	Philadelphia Flyers	9–14–2	20

December: 7–5–1 (home: 4–2–0; road: 3–3–1), 15 points

#	Date	Visitor	Score	Home	Record	Points
26	Dec 2	Pittsburgh Penguins	7–4	Quebec Nordiques	10–14–2	22
27	Dec 6	Washington Capitals	3–5	Pittsburgh Penguins	11–14–2	24
28	Dec 8	Pittsburgh Penguins	3–2	New Jersey Devils	12–14–2	26
29	Dec 9	Chicago Blackhawks	6–4	Pittsburgh Penguins	12–15–2	26
30	Dec 12	Boston Bruins	5–7	Pittsburgh Penguins	13–15–2	28
31	Dec 14	Pittsburgh Penguins	4–4	Minnesota North Stars	13–15–3	29
32	Dec 16	Pittsburgh Penguins	3–4	Calgary Flames	13–16–3	29
33	Dec 19	Hartford Whalers	8–4	Pittsburgh Penguins	13–17–3	29
34	Dec 21	Washington Capitals	2–5	Pittsburgh Penguins	14–17–3	31
35	Dec 23	Pittsburgh Penguins	6–8	New York Islanders	14–18–3	31
36	Dec 26	Pittsburgh Penguins	3–6	Washington Capitals	14–19–3	31
37	Dec 27	New York Rangers	4–7	Pittsburgh Penguins	15–19–3	33
38	Dec 31	Pittsburgh Penguins	5–4	New York Rangers	16–19–3	35

January: 6–6–1 (home: 3–3–1; road: 3–3–0), 13 points

#	Date	Visitor	Score	Home	Record	Points
39	Jan 2	Boston Bruins	5–2	Pittsburgh Penguins	16–20–3	35
40	Jan 4	Vancouver Canucks	3–4	Pittsburgh Penguins	17–20–3	37
41	Jan 6	Winnipeg Jets	3–5	Pittsburgh Penguins	18–20–3	39
42	Jan 8	Pittsburgh Penguins	7–5	New York Rangers	19–20–3	41
43	Jan 10	Pittsburgh Penguins	3–6	New Jersey Devils	19–21–3	41
44	Jan 12	Pittsburgh Penguins	6–4	Washington Capitals	20–21–3	43
45	Jan 16	Philadelphia Flyers	3–4	Pittsburgh Penguins	21–21–3	45
46	Jan 18	New York Rangers	3–3	Pittsburgh Penguins	21–21–4	46
47	Jan 23	New Jersey Devils	4–2	Pittsburgh Penguins	21–22–4	46
48	Jan 25	Pittsburgh Penguins	5–3	Detroit Red Wings	22–22–4	48
49	Jan 27	Pittsburgh Penguins	3–9	New York Islanders	22–23–4	48
50	Jan 28	Pittsburgh Penguins	2–7	Buffalo Sabres	22–24–4	48
51	Jan 30	Philadelphia Flyers	6–3	Pittsburgh Penguins	22–25–4	48

February: 8–5–1 (home: 6–1–0; road: 2–4–1), 17 points

#	Date	Visitor	Score	Home	Record	Points
52	Feb 2	Edmonton Oilers	3–6	Pittsburgh Penguins	23–25–4	50
53	Feb 3	Pittsburgh Penguins	4–8	Toronto Maple Leafs	23–26–4	50
54	Feb 6	New York Islanders	8–7 OT	Pittsburgh Penguins	23–27–4	50
55	Feb 8	Washington Capitals	5–7	Pittsburgh Penguins	24–27–4	52
56	Feb 10	Los Angeles Kings	6–7	Pittsburgh Penguins	25–27–4	54
57	Feb 11	Pittsburgh Penguins	4–1	Philadelphia Flyers	26–27–4	56
58	Feb 14	Pittsburgh Penguins	4–3	New York Rangers	27–27–4	58
59	Feb 16	Pittsburgh Penguins	3–3	Winnipeg Jets	27–27–5	59
60	Feb 18	Pittsburgh Penguins	4–6	Chicago Blackhawks	27–28–5	59
61	Feb 20	Philadelphia Flyers	4–6	Pittsburgh Penguins	28–28–5	61
62	Feb 22	New York Islanders	3–4	Pittsburgh Penguins	29–28–5	63
63	Feb 24	Pittsburgh Penguins	1–11	Montreal Canadiens	29–29–5	63
64	Feb 26	Pittsburgh Penguins	2–3	Quebec Nordiques	29–30–5	63
65	Feb 28	New Jersey Devils	1–2	Pittsburgh Penguins	30–30–5	65

March: 2–9–3 (home: 2–2–2; road: 0–7–1), 7 points

#	Date	Visitor	Score	Home	Record	Points
66	Mar 2	Pittsburgh Penguins	5–6	New Jersey Devils	30–31–5	65
67	Mar 4	Minnesota North Stars	6–8	Pittsburgh Penguins	31–31–5	67
68	Mar 6	Pittsburgh Penguins	3–4 OT	Edmonton Oilers	31–32–5	67
69	Mar 7	Pittsburgh Penguins	3–6	Calgary Flames	31–33–5	67
70	Mar 10	Pittsburgh Penguins	2–8	Los Angeles Kings	31–34–5	67
71	Mar 11	Pittsburgh Penguins	3–5	Vancouver Canucks	31–35–5	67
72	Mar 15	Detroit Red Wings	1–6	Pittsburgh Penguins	32–35–5	69
73	Mar 17	Minnesota North Stars	6–2	Pittsburgh Penguins	32–36–5	69
74	Mar 18	Pittsburgh Penguins	2–2	New York Islanders	32–36–6	70
75	Mar 22	Pittsburgh Penguins	3–5	Philadelphia Flyers	32–37–6	70
76	Mar 24	Calgary Flames	3–3	Pittsburgh Penguins	32–37–7	71
77	Mar 25	Pittsburgh Penguins	2–4	Hartford Whalers	32–38–7	71
78	Mar 27	Hartford Whalers	3–3	Pittsburgh Penguins	32–38–8	72
79	Mar 29	Pittsburgh Penguins	4–5	St. Louis Blues	32–39–8	72
80	Mar 31	Buffalo Sabres	3–2 OT	Pittsburgh Penguins	32–40–8	72

Legend: Win (2 points) Loss (0 points) Tie (1 point)

== Player statistics ==
Skaters

Regular season
Player	GP	G	A	Pts	+/−	PIM
Mario Lemieux	59	45	78	123	–18	78
Paul Coffey	80	29	74	103	–25	95
John Cullen	72	32	60	92	–13	138
Rob Brown	80	33	47	80	–10	102
Kevin Stevens	76	29	41	70	–13	171
Mark Recchi	74	30	37	67	6	44
Phil Bourque	76	22	17	39	–7	108
Bob Errey	78	20	19	39	3	109
Tony Tanti^{†}	37	14	18	32	–11	22
Zarley Zalapski	51	6	25	31	–14	37
Dan Quinn^{‡}	41	9	20	29	–15	22
Troy Loney	67	11	16	27	–9	168
Barry Pederson^{†}	38	4	18	22	–10	29
Jim Johnson	75	3	13	16	–20	154
Randy Gilhen	61	5	11	16	–8	54
Randy Hillier	61	3	12	15	11	71
Chris Dahlquist	62	4	10	14	–2	56
Andrew McBain^{‡}	41	5	9	14	–8	51
Jock Callander	30	4	7	11	0	49
Gilbert Delorme	54	3	7	10	3	44
Gord Dineen	69	1	8	9	6	125
Richard Zemlak	19	1	5	6	–6	43
Jim Kyte	56	3	1	4	–10	125
Jay Caufield	37	1	2	3	0	123
Jamie Leach	10	0	3	3	3	0
Doug Smith^{†}	10	1	1	2	–2	25
Mark Kachowski	14	0	1	1	1	40
Dave Capuano^{‡}	6	0	0	0	0	2
Rod Buskas^{†}	6	0	0	0	–4	13
Total		318	560	878	—	2,098

Goaltenders

Regular Season
Player	GP	TOI	W	L	T	GA	GAA	SA	SV%	SO	G	A	PIM
Wendell Young	43	2318:16	16	20	3	161	4.17	1263	0.873	1	0	4	8
Frank Pietrangelo	21	1066:26	8	6	2	77	4.33	580	0.867	0	0	0	2
Tom Barrasso	24	1294:19	7	12	3	101	4.68	746	0.865	0	0	0	8
Alain Chevrier^{†}	3	166:06	1	2	0	14	5.06	89	0.843	0	0	1	2
Total		4845:07	32	40	8	353	4.37	2678	0.868	1	0	5	20

^{†}Denotes player spent time with another team before joining the Penguins. Stats reflect time with the Penguins only.
^{‡}Denotes player was traded mid-season. Stats reflect time with the Penguins only.

== Awards and records ==
- Mario Lemieux, All-Star Game MVP
- Mario Lemieux became the first person to score 800 points for the Penguins. He did so in a 4–3 win over Vancouver on January 4.
- Mario Lemieux established a new franchise record for goals (345). He broke the previous records of 316 held by Jean Pronovost.
- Paul Coffey established a franchise record for goals (74) by a defenseman. He broke the previous records of 66 held by both Ron Stackhouse and Randy Carlyle.
- Rod Buskas set a franchise record for penalty minutes (959). He had led the category since the previous season.

== Transactions ==
The Penguins were involved in the following transactions during the 1989–90 season:

=== Trades ===
September 14, 1989	To New York Rangers Lee Giffin	To Pittsburgh Penguins future considerations
October 24, 1989	To Vancouver Canucks Rod Buskas	To Pittsburgh Penguins 1990 6th round pick
January 8, 1990	To Vancouver Canucks Dave Capuano; Andrew McBain; Dan Quinn	To Pittsburgh Penguins Rod Buskas; Barry Pederson; Tony Tanti
February 26, 1990	To Vancouver Canucks cash	To Pittsburgh Penguins Doug Smith
March 6, 1990	To Edmonton Oilers future considerations	To Pittsburgh Penguins Brian Wilks
March 6, 1990	To Chicago Blackhawks future considerations	To Pittsburgh Penguins Alain Chevrier

=== Free agents ===
Player	Acquired from	Lost to	Date
Gilbert Delorme	Detroit Red Wings		June 28, 1989
Tim Tookey		Philadelphia Flyers	June 30, 1989
Chris Clifford	Chicago Blackhawks		September 6, 1989
Steve Dykstra		Hartford Whalers	October 9, 1989
Bryan Erickson		Winnipeg Jets	March 2, 1990

=== Signings ===
Player	Date	Contract terms
Gord Dineen	June 27, 1989	Multi-year contract
Phil Bourque	June 27, 1989	Multi-year contract
Troy Loney	June 27, 1989	Multi-year contract
Wendell Young	June 30, 1989	Multi-year contract
Mario Lemieux	August 1, 1989	5 year/$10 million
Rob Brown	September 14, 1989	2 years
Mike Needham	June 5, 1990	Multi-year contract
Paul Laus	June 5, 1990	Multi-year contract

=== Other ===
Name	Date	Details
John Welday	July 29, 1989	Hired as strength and conditioning coach
Gene Ubriaco	December 5, 1989	Fired as head coach
Tony Esposito	December 5, 1989	Fired as GM
Craig Patrick	December 5, 1989	Hired as head coach/GM
Gilles Meloche	January 24, 1990	Hired as goaltending coach
Craig Patrick	June 12, 1990	Replaced as head coach (remained as GM)
Bob Johnson	June 12, 1990	Hired as head coach
Scotty Bowman	June 12, 1990	Hired as Director of development and recruitment
Joe Dragon	June 15, 1990	Supplemental draft pick
Savo Mitrovic	June 15, 1990	Supplemental draft pick

== Draft picks ==
Pittsburgh Penguins' picks at the 1989 NHL entry draft.

Round	#	Player	Pos	Nationality	College/Junior/Club team (League)
1	16	Jamie Heward	D	Canada	Regina Pats (WHL)
2	37	Paul Laus	D	Canada	Niagara Falls Thunder (OHL)
3	58	John Brill	R	United States	Grand Rapids H.S. (Minn.)
4	79	Todd Nelson	D	Canada	Prince Albert Raiders (WHL)
5	100	Tom Nevers	C	United States	Edina H.S. (Minn.)
6	121	Michael Markovich	D	United States	U. of Denver (NCAA)
6	126^{[a]}	Michael Needham	R	Canada	Kamloops Blazers (WHL)
7	142	Patrick Schafhauser	D	United States	Hill-Murray H.S. (Minn.)
8	163	David Shute	C	United States	Victoria Cougars (WHL)
9	184	Andrew Wolf	D	Canada	Victoria Cougars (WHL)
10	205	Greg Hagen	R	United States	Hill-Murray H.S. (Minn.)
11	226	Scott Farrell	D	Canada	Spokane Chiefs (WHL)
12	247	Jason Smart	C	Canada	Saskatoon Blades (WHL)
S	21	John DePourcq	C	Canada	Ferris State University (CCHA)

Draft notes

- ^{a} The Calgary Flames' sixth-round pick went to the Pittsburgh Penguins as a result of a January 9, 1989, trade that sent Steve Guenette to the Flames in exchange for this pick.
