= 1989–90 Montreal Canadiens season =

NHL hockey team season

1989–90 Montreal Canadiens
- Division: 3rd Adams
- Conference: 3rd Wales
- 1989–90 record: 41–28–11
- Home record: 26–8–6
- Road record: 15–20–5
- Goals for: 288
- Goals against: 234

Team information
- General manager: Serge Savard
- Coach: Pat Burns
- Captain: Guy Carbonneau; Chris Chelios
- Alternate captains: Mats Naslund
- Arena: Montreal Forum

Team leaders
- Goals: Stephane Richer (51)
- Assists: Shayne Corson (44)
- Points: Stephane Richer (91)
- Penalty minutes: Todd Ewen (158)
- Plus/minus: Stephane Richer (+35)
- Wins: Patrick Roy (31)
- Goals against average: Patrick Roy (2.53)

The 1989–90 Montreal Canadiens season was the Canadiens' 81st season. The Canadiens were eliminated in the Adams Division final by the Boston Bruins 4 games to 1.

== Offseason ==
Captain Bob Gainey retired in July 1989. The Canadiens named Guy Carbonneau and Chris Chelios co-captains, in August. Meanwhile, longtime defenceman Larry Robinson signed with the Los Angeles Kings via free-agency.

=== NHL draft ===
Montreal's draft picks at the 1989 NHL entry draft held at the Met Center in Bloomington, Minnesota.

| Round | # | Player | Nationality | College/Junior/Club team (League) |
|---|---|---|---|---|
| 1 | 13 | Lindsay Vallis | Canada | Seattle Thunderbirds (WHL) |
| 2 | 30 | Patrice Brisebois | Canada | Laval Titan (QMJHL) |
| 2 | 41 | Steve Larouche | Canada | Trois-Rivieres Draveurs (QMJHL) |
| 3 | 51 | Pierre Sevigny | Canada | Verdun Junior Canadiens (QMJHL) |
| 4 | 83 | Andre Racicot | Canada | Granby Bisons (QMJHL) |
| 5 | 104 | Marc Deschamps | Canada | Cornell University (ECAC) |
| 7 | 146 | Craig Ferguson | United States | Yale University (ECAC) |
| 8 | 167 | Patrick Lebeau | Canada | Saint-Jean Lynx (QMJHL) |
| 9 | 188 | Roy Mitchell | Canada | Portland Winter Hawks (WHL) |
| 11 | 230 | Justin Duberman | United States | University of North Dakota (WCHA) |
| 12 | 251 | Steve Cadieux | Canada | Shawinigan Cataractes (QMJHL) |
| S | 25 | Craig Charron | United States | University of Massachusetts Lowell (Hockey East) |

== Regular season ==
The Canadiens finished the regular season with only 234 goals allowed, second only to the Boston Bruins. Their power play struggled throughout the season and they finished last in power-play goals scored (54) and power-play percentage (15.88%). Although the Canadiens scored the fewest short-handed goals in the league, with 4, they only allowed 7, good enough for 4th place in the league (tied with the Buffalo Sabres and Edmonton Oilers).

=== Final standings ===
Adams Division
| | GP | W | L | T | GF | GA | Pts |
|---|---|---|---|---|---|---|---|
| **Boston Bruins** | 80 | 46 | 25 | 9 | 289 | 232 | 101 |
| **Buffalo Sabres** | 80 | 45 | 27 | 8 | 286 | 248 | 98 |
| **Montreal Canadiens** | 80 | 41 | 28 | 11 | 288 | 234 | 93 |
| **Hartford Whalers** | 80 | 38 | 33 | 9 | 275 | 268 | 85 |
| Quebec Nordiques | 80 | 12 | 61 | 7 | 240 | 407 | 31 |

Note: GP = Games played, W = Wins, L = Losses, T = Ties, Pts = Points, GF = Goals for, GA = Goals against
Note: Teams that qualified for the playoffs are highlighted in bold.

Wales Conference
| R | | Div | GP | W | L | T | GF | GA | Pts |
|---|---|---|---|---|---|---|---|---|---|
| **1** | **p – Boston Bruins** | **ADM** | **80** | **46** | **25** | **9** | **289** | **232** | **101** |
| **2** | **Buffalo Sabres** | **ADM** | **80** | **45** | **27** | **8** | **286** | **248** | **98** |
| **3** | **Montreal Canadiens** | **ADM** | **80** | **41** | **28** | **11** | **288** | **234** | **93** |
| **4** | **Hartford Whalers** | **ADM** | **80** | **38** | **33** | **9** | **275** | **268** | **85** |
| **5** | **New York Rangers** | **PTK** | **80** | **36** | **31** | **13** | **279** | **267** | **85** |
| **6** | **New Jersey Devils** | **PTK** | **80** | **37** | **34** | **9** | **295** | **288** | **83** |
| **7** | **Washington Capitals** | **PTK** | **80** | **36** | **38** | **6** | **284** | **275** | **78** |
| **8** | **New York Islanders** | **PTK** | **80** | **31** | **38** | **11** | **281** | **288** | **73** |
| 9 | Pittsburgh Penguins | PTK | 80 | 32 | 40 | 8 | 318 | 359 | 72 |
| 10 | Philadelphia Flyers | PTK | 80 | 30 | 39 | 11 | 290 | 297 | 71 |
| 11 | Quebec Nordiques | ADM | 80 | 12 | 61 | 7 | 240 | 407 | 31 |

Divisions: PTK – Patrick, ADM – Adams

bold – Qualified for playoffs; p – Won Presidents' Trophy

=== Record vs. opponents ===
==== Vs. Wales Conference ====
1989–90 NHL records Vs. Adams Division
| Team | **BOS** | **BUF** | **HFD** | **MTL** | **QUE** | **Total** |
|---|---|---|---|---|---|---|
| Boston | — | 4–3–1 | 4–3–1 | 4–3–1 | 6–1–1 | **18–10–4** |
| Buffalo | 3–4–1 | — | 6–2 | 4–3–1 | 7–0–1 | **20–9–3** |
| Hartford | 3–4–1 | 2–6 | — | 3–4–1 | 6–1–1 | **14–15–3** |
| Montreal | 3–4–1 | 3–4–1 | 4–3–1 | — | 7–1 | **17–12–3** |
| Quebec | 1–6–1 | 0–7–1 | 1–6–1 | 1–7 | — | **3–26–3** |

1989–90 NHL records Vs. Patrick Division
| Team | **NJD** | **NYI** | **NYR** | **PHI** | **PIT** | **WSH** | **Total** |
|---|---|---|---|---|---|---|---|
| Boston | 1–1–1 | 1–1–1 | 0–3 | 3–0 | 2–1 | 2–1 | **9–7–2** |
| Buffalo | 1–2 | 0–3 | 2–0–1 | 2–1 | 3–0 | 1–1–1 | **9–7–2** |
| Hartford | 2–1 | 2–1 | 1–2 | 2–1 | 2–0–1 | 2–1 | **11–6–2** |
| Montreal | 2–1 | 2–1 | 3–0 | 0–2–1 | 2–1 | 1–2 | **10–7–1** |
| Quebec | 0–3 | 2–1 | 0–3 | 1–1–1 | 1–2 | 0–3 | **4–13–1** |

==== Vs. Campbell Conference ====
1989–90 NHL records Vs. Norris Division
| Team | **CHI** | **DET** | **MIN** | **STL** | **TOR** | **Total** |
|---|---|---|---|---|---|---|
| Boston | 3–0 | 3–0 | 2–1 | 2–1 | 2–1 | **12–3–0** |
| Buffalo | 1–2 | 2–1 | 1–1–1 | 1–2 | 2–1 | **7–7–1** |
| Hartford | 1–2 | 2–0–1 | 2–1 | 1–2 | 1–1–1 | **7–6–2** |
| Montreal | 1–2 | 1–0–2 | 2–1 | 1–0–2 | 2–1 | **7–4–4** |
| Quebec | 1–2 | 0–3 | 1–2 | 0–3 | 0–3 | **2–13–0** |

1989–90 NHL records Vs. Smythe Division
| Team | **CGY** | **EDM** | **LAK** | **VAN** | **WIN** | **Total** |
|---|---|---|---|---|---|---|
| Boston | 1–1–1 | 2–0–1 | 2–1 | 1–2 | 1–1–1 | **7–5–3** |
| Buffalo | 1–1–1 | 1–2 | 2–1 | 2–0–1 | 3–0 | **9–4–2** |
| Hartford | 0–2–1 | 1–0–2 | 2–1 | 2–1 | 1–2 | **6–6–3** |
| Montreal | 2–1 | 1–1–1 | 1–1–1 | 2–1 | 1–1–1 | **7–5–3** |
| Quebec | 0–1–2 | 0–3 | 0–3 | 2–0–1 | 1–2 | **3–9–3** |

== Schedule and results ==
1989–90 regular season
October

| Game | Result | Date | Score | Opponent | Record |
|---|---|---|---|---|---|
| 1 | W | October 5, 1989 | 4-1 | @ Hartford Whalers | 1-0-0 |
| 2 | W | October 7, 1989 | 5–1 | Buffalo Sabres | 2–0–0 |
| 3 | L | October 9, 1989 | 0–2 | @ Boston Bruins | 2–1–0 |
| 4 | W | October 11, 1989 | 4–2 | Boston Bruins | 3–1–0 |
| 5 | W | October 13, 1989 | 4–3 OT | @ New Jersey Devils | 4–1–0 |
| 6 | L | October 14, 1989 | 1–2 OT | @ Pittsburgh Penguins | 4–2–0 |
| 7 | L | October 16, 1989 | 3–4 OT | Washington Capitals | 4–3–0 |
| 8 | W | October 18, 1989 | 2–1 | Calgary Flames | 5–3–0 |
| 9 | L | October 20, 1989 | 2–6 | @ Buffalo Sabres | 5–4–0 |
| 10 | L | October 21, 1989 | 4–5 | New Jersey Devils | 5–5–0 |
| 11 | W | October 23, 1989 | 3–2 | Hartford Whalers | 6–5–0 |
| 12 | L | October 26, 1989 | 3–5 | @ Chicago Blackhawks | 6–6–0 |
| 13 | W | October 28, 1989 | 5–1 | Pittsburgh Penguins | 7–6–0 |
| 14 | W | October 29, 1989 | 5–4 | Edmonton Oilers | 8–6–0 |
| 15 | W | October 31, 1989 | 3–0 | @ New York Islanders | 9–6–0 |

November

| Game | Result | Date | Score | Opponent | Record |
|---|---|---|---|---|---|
| 16 | L | November 2, 1989 | 3–4 | Buffalo Sabres | 9–7–0 |
| 17 | W | November 4, 1989 | 3–2 | New York Rangers | 10–7–0 |
| 18 | T | November 6, 1989 | 3–3 OT | St. Louis Blues | 10–7–1 |
| 19 | W | November 8, 1989 | 3–2 | @ New York Rangers | 11–7–1 |
| 20 | T | November 9, 1989 | 1–1 OT | @ St. Louis Blues | 11–7–2 |
| 21 | L | November 11, 1989 | 4–5 | @ Los Angeles Kings | 11–8–2 |
| 22 | W | November 15, 1989 | 5–1 | Winnipeg Jets | 12–8–2 |
| 23 | L | November 16, 1989 | 2–3 | @ Boston Bruins | 12–9–2 |
| 24 | W | November 18, 1989 | 4–3 OT | Toronto Maple Leafs | 13–9–2 |
| 25 | W | November 20, 1989 | 3–2 | Calgary Flames | 14–9–2 |
| 26 | L | November 22, 1989 | 1–5 | @ Philadelphia Flyers | 14–10–2 |
| 27 | W | November 25, 1989 | 5–3 | Boston Bruins | 15–10–2 |
| 28 | W | November 29, 1989 | 5–2 | Quebec Nordiques | 16–10–2 |
| 29 | W | November 30, 1989 | 6–2 | @ Quebec Nordiques | 17–10–2 |

December

| Game | Result | Date | Score | Opponent | Record |
|---|---|---|---|---|---|
| 30 | L | December 2, 1989 | 3–4 | Hartford Whalers | 17–11–2 |
| 31 | W | December 6, 1989 | 4–1 | @ Minnesota North Stars | 18–11–2 |
| 32 | T | December 8, 1989 | 6–6 OT | @ Winnipeg Jets | 18–11–3 |
| 33 | L | December 9, 1989 | 4–7 | @ Toronto Maple Leafs | 18–12–3 |
| 34 | T | December 11, 1989 | 2–2 OT | Los Angeles Kings | 18–12–4 |
| 35 | L | December 13, 1989 | 1–3 | Chicago Blackhawks | 18–13–4 |
| 36 | W | December 16, 1989 | 3–1 | Detroit Red Wings | 19–13–4 |
| 37 | W | December 17, 1989 | 2–0 | @ New York Rangers | 20–13–4 |
| 38 | T | December 22, 1989 | 2–2 OT | @ Buffalo Sabres | 20–13–5 |
| 39 | L | December 23, 1989 | 3–5 | Philadelphia Flyers | 20–14–5 |
| 40 | L | December 27, 1989 | 1–2 | @ Vancouver Canucks | 20–15–5 |
| 41 | L | December 29, 1989 | 2–6 | @ Edmonton Oilers | 20–16–5 |
| 42 | L | December 30, 1989 | 3–5 | @ Calgary Flames | 20–17–5 |

January

| Game | Result | Date | Score | Opponent | Record |
|---|---|---|---|---|---|
| 43 | W | January 6, 1990 | 6–3 | Buffalo Sabres | 21–17–5 |
| 44 | W | January 7, 1990 | 5–3 | Vancouver Canucks | 22–17–5 |
| 45 | L | January 9, 1990 | 2–5 | @ Quebec Nordiques | 22–18–5 |
| 46 | W | January 12, 1990 | 5–2 | @ New Jersey Devils | 23–18–5 |
| 47 | T | January 13, 1990 | 2–2 OT | Philadelphia Flyers | 23–18–6 |
| 48 | W | January 15, 1990 | 4–3 | Minnesota North Stars | 24–18–6 |
| 49 | L | January 17, 1990 | 3–6 | New York Islanders | 24–19–6 |
| 50 | W | January 24, 1990 | 7–3 | Quebec Nordiques | 25–19–6 |
| 51 | L | January 26, 1990 | 3–6 | @ Washington Capitals | 25–20–6 |
| 52 | W | January 27, 1990 | 5–3 | @ Toronto Maple Leafs | 26–20–6 |
| 53 | L | January 29, 1990 | 1–2 | Boston Bruins | 26–21–6 |

February

| Game | Result | Date | Score | Opponent | Record |
|---|---|---|---|---|---|
| 54 | W | February 1, 1990 | 4–2 | @ Boston Bruins | 27–21–6 |
| 55 | W | February 3, 1990 | 1–0 | Buffalo Sabres | 28–21–6 |
| 56 | W | February 4, 1990 | 2–0 | Hartford Whalers | 29–21–6 |
| 57 | L | February 7, 1990 | 1–3 | @ Buffalo Sabres | 29–22–6 |
| 58 | W | February 10, 1990 | 7–2 | Quebec Nordiques | 30–22–6 |
| 59 | W | February 14, 1990 | 10–1 | Vancouver Canucks | 31–22–6 |
| 60 | L | February 16, 1990 | 3–5 | @ Buffalo Sabres | 31–23–6 |
| 61 | W | February 17, 1990 | 7–3 | Hartford Whalers | 32–23–6 |
| 62 | T | February 19, 1990 | 5–5 OT | @ Detroit Red Wings | 32–23–7 |
| 63 | W | February 22, 1990 | 6–5 | @ Quebec Nordiques | 33–23–7 |
| 64 | W | February 24, 1990 | 11–1 | Pittsburgh Penguins | 34–23–7 |
| 65 | W | February 25, 1990 | 6–5 OT | St. Louis Blues | 35–23–7 |
| 66 | L | February 28, 1990 | 1–3 | @ Hartford Whalers | 35–24–7 |

March

| Game | Result | Date | Score | Opponent | Record |
|---|---|---|---|---|---|
| 67 | L | March 1, 1990 | 3–5 | @ Boston Bruins | 35–25–7 |
| 68 | L | March 3, 1990 | 2–3 | @ Minnesota North Stars | 35–26–7 |
| 69 | W | March 7, 1990 | 5–2 | @ Los Angeles Kings | 36–26–7 |
| 70 | T | March 10, 1990 | 3–3 OT | Detroit Red Wings | 36–26–8 |
| 71 | W | March 13, 1990 | 4–2 | @ New York Islanders | 37–26–8 |
| 72 | T | March 14, 1990 | 3–3 OT | Edmonton Oilers | 37–26–9 |
| 73 | W | March 17, 1990 | 3–2 OT | Chicago Blackhawks | 38–26–9 |
| 74 | W | March 18, 1990 | 8–3 | Quebec Nordiques | 39–26–9 |
| 75 | L | March 21, 1990 | 2–3 | @ Winnipeg Jets | 39–27–9 |
| 76 | W | March 23, 1990 | 4–2 | @ Washington Capitals | 40–27–9 |
| 77 | L | March 24, 1990 | 4–7 | @ Hartford Whalers | 40–28–9 |
| 78 | W | March 29, 1990 | 5–2 | @ Quebec Nordiques | 41–28–9 |
| 79 | T | March 31, 1990 | 2–2 OT | Boston Bruins | 41–28–10 |

April

| Game | Result | Date | Score | Opponent | Record |
|---|---|---|---|---|---|
| 80 | T | April 1, 1990 | 1–1 OT | @ Hartford Whalers | 41–28–11 |

Legend: Win (2 points) Loss (0 points) Tie (1 point)

== Player statistics ==
=== Regular season ===
==== Scoring ====
| Player | Pos | GP | G | A | Pts | PIM | +/- | PPG | SHG | GWG |
|---|---|---|---|---|---|---|---|---|---|---|
| Stephane Richer | RW | 75 | 51 | 40 | 91 | 46 | 35 | 9 | 0 | 8 |
| Shayne Corson | LW | 76 | 31 | 44 | 75 | 144 | 33 | 7 | 0 | 6 |
| Russ Courtnall | RW | 80 | 27 | 32 | 59 | 27 | 14 | 3 | 0 | 2 |
| Guy Carbonneau | C | 68 | 19 | 36 | 55 | 37 | 21 | 1 | 1 | 3 |
| Brian Skrudland | C | 59 | 11 | 31 | 42 | 56 | 21 | 4 | 0 | 1 |
| Mike McPhee | LW | 56 | 23 | 18 | 41 | 47 | 28 | 0 | 1 | 1 |
| Mats Naslund | LW | 72 | 21 | 20 | 41 | 19 | 3 | 6 | 0 | 3 |
| Petr Svoboda | D | 60 | 5 | 31 | 36 | 98 | 20 | 2 | 0 | 2 |
| Stephan Lebeau | C | 57 | 15 | 20 | 35 | 11 | 13 | 5 | 0 | 3 |
| Chris Chelios | D | 53 | 9 | 22 | 31 | 136 | 20 | 1 | 2 | 1 |
| Bobby Smith | C | 53 | 12 | 14 | 26 | 35 | -4 | 4 | 0 | 2 |
| Brent Gilchrist | LW | 57 | 9 | 15 | 24 | 28 | 3 | 1 | 0 | 0 |
| Mike Keane | RW | 74 | 9 | 15 | 24 | 78 | 0 | 1 | 0 | 1 |
| Ryan Walter | C/LW | 70 | 8 | 16 | 24 | 59 | 4 | 1 | 0 | 1 |
| Mathieu Schneider | D | 44 | 7 | 14 | 21 | 25 | 2 | 5 | 0 | 1 |
| Jyrki Lumme | D | 54 | 1 | 19 | 20 | 41 | 17 | 0 | 0 | 0 |
| Claude Lemieux | RW | 39 | 8 | 10 | 18 | 106 | -8 | 3 | 0 | 1 |
| Eric Desjardins | D | 55 | 3 | 13 | 16 | 51 | 1 | 1 | 0 | 0 |
| Craig Ludwig | D | 73 | 1 | 15 | 16 | 108 | 24 | 0 | 0 | 0 |
| Sylvain Lefebvre | D | 68 | 3 | 10 | 13 | 61 | 18 | 0 | 0 | 0 |
| J.J. Daigneault | D | 36 | 2 | 10 | 12 | 14 | 11 | 0 | 0 | 1 |
| Todd Ewen | RW | 41 | 4 | 6 | 10 | 158 | 1 | 0 | 0 | 2 |
| Jocelyn Lemieux | RW | 34 | 4 | 2 | 6 | 61 | -1 | 0 | 0 | 1 |
| Patrick Roy | G | 54 | 0 | 5 | 5 | 0 | 0 | 0 | 0 | 0 |
| Tom Chorske | LW | 14 | 3 | 1 | 4 | 2 | 2 | 0 | 0 | 0 |
| Donald Dufresne | D | 18 | 0 | 4 | 4 | 23 | 1 | 0 | 0 | 0 |
| Andrew Cassels | C | 6 | 2 | 0 | 2 | 2 | 1 | 0 | 0 | 1 |
| Martin Desjardins | C | 8 | 0 | 2 | 2 | 2 | -4 | 0 | 0 | 0 |
| Lyle Odelein | D | 8 | 0 | 2 | 2 | 33 | -1 | 0 | 0 | 0 |
| Mark Pederson | LW | 9 | 0 | 2 | 2 | 2 | 0 | 0 | 0 | 0 |
| Ed Cristofoli | RW | 9 | 0 | 1 | 1 | 4 | -1 | 0 | 0 | 0 |
| Brian Hayward | G | 29 | 0 | 0 | 0 | 4 | 0 | 0 | 0 | 0 |
| Steve Martinson | LW | 13 | 0 | 0 | 0 | 64 | -2 | 0 | 0 | 0 |
| Andre Racicot | G | 1 | 0 | 0 | 0 | 0 | 0 | 0 | 0 | 0 |

==== Goaltending ====
| Player | MIN | GP | W | L | T | GA | GAA | SO | SA | SV | SV% |
|---|---|---|---|---|---|---|---|---|---|---|---|
| Patrick Roy | 3173 | 54 | 31 | 16 | 5 | 134 | 2.53 | 3 | 1524 | 1390 | .912 |
| Brian Hayward | 1674 | 29 | 10 | 12 | 6 | 94 | 3.37 | 1 | 770 | 676 | .878 |
| Andre Racicot | 13 | 1 | 0 | 0 | 0 | 3 | 13.85 | 0 | 6 | 3 | .500 |
| Team: | 4860 | 80 | 41 | 28 | 11 | 231 | 2.85 | 4 | 2300 | 2069 | .900 |

=== Playoffs ===
==== Scoring ====
| Player | Pos | GP | G | A | Pts | PIM | PPG | SHG | GWG |
|---|---|---|---|---|---|---|---|---|---|
| Stephane Richer | RW | 9 | 7 | 3 | 10 | 2 | 1 | 0 | 1 |
| Shayne Corson | LW | 11 | 2 | 8 | 10 | 20 | 0 | 0 | 0 |
| Brian Skrudland | C | 11 | 3 | 5 | 8 | 30 | 0 | 0 | 1 |
| Russ Courtnall | RW | 11 | 5 | 1 | 6 | 10 | 0 | 0 | 0 |
| Guy Carbonneau | C | 11 | 2 | 3 | 5 | 6 | 0 | 0 | 0 |
| Bobby Smith | C | 11 | 1 | 4 | 5 | 6 | 0 | 0 | 0 |
| Petr Svoboda | D | 10 | 0 | 5 | 5 | 7 | 0 | 0 | 0 |
| Claude Lemieux | RW | 11 | 1 | 3 | 4 | 38 | 0 | 0 | 1 |
| Mathieu Schneider | D | 9 | 1 | 3 | 4 | 31 | 1 | 0 | 0 |
| Stephan Lebeau | C | 2 | 3 | 0 | 3 | 0 | 0 | 0 | 1 |
| Brent Gilchrist | LW | 8 | 2 | 0 | 2 | 2 | 0 | 0 | 0 |
| Mike McPhee | LW | 9 | 1 | 1 | 2 | 16 | 0 | 0 | 0 |
| Mats Naslund | LW | 3 | 1 | 1 | 2 | 0 | 0 | 0 | 1 |
| Ryan Walter | C/LW | 11 | 0 | 2 | 2 | 0 | 0 | 0 | 0 |
| Chris Chelios | D | 5 | 0 | 1 | 1 | 8 | 0 | 0 | 0 |
| Donald Dufresne | D | 10 | 0 | 1 | 1 | 18 | 0 | 0 | 0 |
| Mike Keane | RW | 11 | 0 | 1 | 1 | 8 | 0 | 0 | 0 |
| Craig Ludwig | D | 11 | 0 | 1 | 1 | 16 | 0 | 0 | 0 |
| Patrick Roy | G | 11 | 0 | 1 | 1 | 0 | 0 | 0 | 0 |
| J.J. Daigneault | D | 9 | 0 | 0 | 0 | 2 | 0 | 0 | 0 |
| Eric Desjardins | D | 6 | 0 | 0 | 0 | 10 | 0 | 0 | 0 |
| Todd Ewen | RW | 10 | 0 | 0 | 0 | 4 | 0 | 0 | 0 |
| Brian Hayward | G | 1 | 0 | 0 | 0 | 0 | 0 | 0 | 0 |
| Sylvain Lefebvre | D | 6 | 0 | 0 | 0 | 2 | 0 | 0 | 0 |
| Mark Pederson | LW | 2 | 0 | 0 | 0 | 0 | 0 | 0 | 0 |

==== Goaltending ====
| Player | MIN | GP | W | L | GA | GAA | SO | SA | SV | SV% |
|---|---|---|---|---|---|---|---|---|---|---|
| Patrick Roy | 641 | 11 | 5 | 6 | 26 | 2.43 | 1 | 292 | 266 | .911 |
| Brian Hayward | 33 | 1 | 0 | 0 | 2 | 3.64 | 0 | 18 | 16 | .889 |
| Team: | 674 | 11 | 5 | 6 | 28 | 2.49 | 1 | 310 | 282 | .910 |

Note:

Pos = Position;GP = Games played; G = Goals; A = Assists; Pts = Points; PIM = Penalty minutes; +/- = Plus/minus; PPG = Power-play goals; SHG = Short-handed goals; GWG = Game-winning goals
Pos = Position;GP = Games played; Min, TOI = Minutes played; W = Wins; L = Losses; T,T/OT = Ties; OTL = Overtime losses; GA = Goals-against; GAA = Goals-against average; SO = Shutouts; SA = Shots against; SV = Shots saved;SV% = Save percentage;
