= 1989–90 Quebec Nordiques season =

National Hockey League team season

1989–90 Quebec Nordiques
- Division: 5th Adams
- Conference: 11th Wales
- 1989–90 record: 12–61–7
- Home record: 8–26–6
- Road record: 4–35–1
- Goals for: 240
- Goals against: 407

Team information
- General manager: Martin Madden (Oct–Feb); Maurice Filion (Feb–Apr; interim)
- Coach: Michel Bergeron
- Captain: Peter Stastny (Oct–Mar); Vacant (Mar–Apr)
- Arena: Colisée de Québec

Team leaders
- Goals: Joe Sakic (39)
- Assists: Joe Sakic (63)
- Points: Joe Sakic (102)
- Penalty minutes: Paul Gillis (234)
- Wins: Ron Tugnutt (5)
- Goals against average: Ron Tugnutt (4.61)

The 1989–90 Quebec Nordiques season was the Nordiques 11th season in the National Hockey League (NHL).

== Offseason ==
The Nordiques would not bring back Jean Perron, who finished the 1988–89 season as the interim head coach of the team. Quebec would bring back former head coach Michel Bergeron, who had coached the club from 1980 to 1987. Bergeron left the Nordiques to coach the New York Rangers from 1987 to 1989, leading them to two consecutive 82 point seasons. The club also named Martin Madden as the new general manager.

At the 1989 NHL entry draft, the Nordiques had the first overall draft pick, and selected Mats Sundin from Nacka HK. Sundin became the first ever European born player drafted with the first overall selection. In 25 games with Nacka, Sundin had ten goals and 18 points. With their second pick, Quebec drafted Adam Foote from the Sault Ste. Marie Greyhounds. In 66 games, Foote had seven goals and 39 points in 1988–89.

Quebec made some trades during the off-season, dealing away their top goal scorer from the 1988–89 season, Walt Poddubny, along with a fourth round draft pick in the 1990 NHL entry draft to the New Jersey Devils for Joe Cirella, Claude Loiselle, and an eighth round draft pick in the 1990 NHL entry draft. Cirella had three goals and 22 points in 80 games with the Devils in 1988–89, while Loiselle had seven goals and 21 points in 74 games. Quebec also traded Bob Mason to the Washington Capitals for future considerations, and Gaetan Duchesne to the Minnesota North Stars for Kevin Kaminski. Kaminski spent the 1988–89 with the Saskatoon Blades of the WHL, scoring 25 goals and 68 points in 52 games. Right at the end of the pre-season, the Nordiques traded away Randy Moller to the New York Rangers for Michel Petit. Petit had eight goals and 33 points with the Rangers in 1988–89.

The biggest move the club made was signing free agent Guy Lafleur to a two-year contract. Lafleur, who originally retired during the 1984–85, was inducted into the Hockey Hall of Fame in 1988. Lafleur came out of retirement and signed with the New York Rangers for the 1988–89 season, where he scored 18 goals and 45 points in 67 games with the Rangers. Lafleur won five Stanley Cup championships with the Montreal Canadiens, and had a streak of 50 or more goals in a season and at least 119 points during a six-year stretch from 1974 to 1980. Lafleur also scored a league high 60 goals in 1977–78, and led the league in scoring for three consecutive seasons, from 1975 to 1978. The Nordiques also signed Lucien DeBlois, who also spent the previous season with the New York Rangers, where he had nine goals and 33 points in 73 games.

== Regular season ==
Quebec would have a poor start to the season, going 1-4-1 in their first six games, before winning two in a row to be only a game under .500. The Nordiques then lost eight games in a row to quickly fall out of the playoff race, before winning two in a row to improve to 5–12–1. However, any hope of contention ended when they only won a total of four games in December and January.

As the losses piled up for the Nordiques, they began to make trades. Greg Adams and Robert Picard were traded to the Detroit Red Wings for former Nordiques player Tony McKegney, while Jeff Brown was dealt to the St. Louis Blues for Tony Hrkac and Greg Millen.

By February 2, 1990, the Nordiques were 9–36–6, and their season was all but finished. On that date, the club fired general manager Martin Madden, and replaced him on an interim basis with former general manager Maurice Filion. Under Filion, the Nordiques traded away Michel Goulet, Greg Millen and a sixth round draft pick in the 1991 NHL entry draft to the Chicago Blackhawks for Everett Sanipass, Mario Doyon, and Dan Vincelette. The trades continued, as team captain Peter Stastny was traded to the New Jersey Devils for Craig Wolanin and future considerations, which turned out to be Randy Velischek.

None of the roster moves had much effect. The Nordiques only won three more games for the remainder of the season to finish with a 12-61-7 record, earning 31 points—easily the worst record in the NHL. The next-worst record belonged to the Vancouver Canucks, who finished with more than twice the Nordiques' point total. The twelve wins was the fewest by a team since the Winnipeg Jets had nine in 1980–81, while their 31 points was the fewest since the Washington Capitals had 21 in the 1974–75 season. It is still the worst season in Nordiques/Avalanche history, and one of the worst for a non-expansion team since 1967.

Offensively, the Nordiques were led by Joe Sakic, who had 39 goals and 102 points, both team highs. Peter Stastny was the only other Nordique to finish with more than 20 goals, as he had 24 goals and 62 points before being traded to the New Jersey Devils. Tony McKegney had 16 goals and 27 points in 48 games after being acquired from the Detroit Red Wings, while Guy Lafleur had 12 goals and 34 points in his first season with the Nordiques.

On defence, Michel Petit put up twelve goals and 36 points in his first season with the club. Rookie Bryan Fogarty had four goals and 14 points in 45 games, however, he had a -47 rating, the worst on the club.

In goal, Ron Tugnutt led the Nordiques with five wins, while posting a club best 4.61 GAA in 35 games.

The Nordiques finished the regular season last in scoring (240 goals for), last in goaltending (407 goals allowed), last in power-play goals allowed (98) and last in penalty-killing percentage (74.35%).

The Nordiques finished the 1989–90 regular season with a 5.05 GAA. They are the last team to finish the regular season with a GAA above five to date.

=== Final standings ===
Adams Division
	GP	W	L	T	GF	GA	Pts
**Boston Bruins**	80	46	25	9	289	232	101
**Buffalo Sabres**	80	45	27	8	286	248	98
**Montreal Canadiens**	80	41	28	11	288	234	93
**Hartford Whalers**	80	38	33	9	275	268	85
Quebec Nordiques	80	12	61	7	240	407	31

Note: GP = Games played, W = Wins, L = Losses, T = Ties, Pts = Points, GF = Goals for, GA = Goals against
Note: Teams that qualified for the playoffs are highlighted in bold.

Wales Conference
R		Div	GP	W	L	T	GF	GA	Pts
**1**	**p – Boston Bruins**	**ADM**	**80**	**46**	**25**	**9**	**289**	**232**	**101**
**2**	**Buffalo Sabres**	**ADM**	**80**	**45**	**27**	**8**	**286**	**248**	**98**
**3**	**Montreal Canadiens**	**ADM**	**80**	**41**	**28**	**11**	**288**	**234**	**93**
**4**	**Hartford Whalers**	**ADM**	**80**	**38**	**33**	**9**	**275**	**268**	**85**
**5**	**New York Rangers**	**PTK**	**80**	**36**	**31**	**13**	**279**	**267**	**85**
**6**	**New Jersey Devils**	**PTK**	**80**	**37**	**34**	**9**	**295**	**288**	**83**
**7**	**Washington Capitals**	**PTK**	**80**	**36**	**38**	**6**	**284**	**275**	**78**
**8**	**New York Islanders**	**PTK**	**80**	**31**	**38**	**11**	**281**	**288**	**73**
9	Pittsburgh Penguins	PTK	80	32	40	8	318	359	72
10	Philadelphia Flyers	PTK	80	30	39	11	290	297	71
11	Quebec Nordiques	ADM	80	12	61	7	240	407	31

Divisions: PTK – Patrick, ADM – Adams

bold – Qualified for playoffs; p – Won Presidents' Trophy

=== Record vs. opponents ===
==== Vs. Wales Conference ====
1989–90 NHL records Vs. Adams Division
Team	**BOS**	**BUF**	**HFD**	**MTL**	**QUE**	**Total**
Boston	—	4–3–1	4–3–1	4–3–1	6–1–1	**18–10–4**
Buffalo	3–4–1	—	6–2	4–3–1	7–0–1	**20–9–3**
Hartford	3–4–1	2–6	—	3–4–1	6–1–1	**14–15–3**
Montreal	3–4–1	3–4–1	4–3–1	—	7–1	**17–12–3**
Quebec	1–6–1	0–7–1	1–6–1	1–7	—	**3–26–3**

1989–90 NHL records Vs. Patrick Division
Team	**NJD**	**NYI**	**NYR**	**PHI**	**PIT**	**WSH**	**Total**
Boston	1–1–1	1–1–1	0–3	3–0	2–1	2–1	**9–7–2**
Buffalo	1–2	0–3	2–0–1	2–1	3–0	1–1–1	**9–7–2**
Hartford	2–1	2–1	1–2	2–1	2–0–1	2–1	**11–6–2**
Montreal	2–1	2–1	3–0	0–2–1	2–1	1–2	**10–7–1**
Quebec	0–3	2–1	0–3	1–1–1	1–2	0–3	**4–13–1**

==== Vs. Campbell Conference ====
1989–90 NHL records Vs. Norris Division
Team	**CHI**	**DET**	**MIN**	**STL**	**TOR**	**Total**
Boston	3–0	3–0	2–1	2–1	2–1	**12–3–0**
Buffalo	1–2	2–1	1–1–1	1–2	2–1	**7–7–1**
Hartford	1–2	2–0–1	2–1	1–2	1–1–1	**7–6–2**
Montreal	1–2	1–0–2	2–1	1–0–2	2–1	**7–4–4**
Quebec	1–2	0–3	1–2	0–3	0–3	**2–13–0**

1989–90 NHL records Vs. Smythe Division
Team	**CGY**	**EDM**	**LAK**	**VAN**	**WIN**	**Total**
Boston	1–1–1	2–0–1	2–1	1–2	1–1–1	**7–5–3**
Buffalo	1–1–1	1–2	2–1	2–0–1	3–0	**9–4–2**
Hartford	0–2–1	1–0–2	2–1	2–1	1–2	**6–6–3**
Montreal	2–1	1–1–1	1–1–1	2–1	1–1–1	**7–5–3**
Quebec	0–1–2	0–3	0–3	2–0–1	1–2	**3–9–3**

== Schedule and results ==
1989–90 regular season
October

Game	Result	Date	Score	Opponent	Record	Attendance
1	L	October 5, 1989	3–4	@ Buffalo Sabres (1989–90)	0–1–0	14,465
2	W	October 7, 1989	4–1	Boston Bruins (1989–90)	1–1–0	15,399
3	L	October 8, 1989	6–9	Hartford Whalers (1989–90)	1–2–0	15,379
4	L	October 12, 1989	2–4	@ Philadelphia Flyers (1989–90)	1–3–0	17,266
5	L	October 14, 1989	2–3	@ Minnesota North Stars (1989–90)	1–4–0	11,236
6	T	October 17, 1989	8–8 OT	Calgary Flames (1989–90)	1–4–1	15,391
7	W	October 19, 1989	5–3	@ Chicago Blackhawks (1989–90)	2–4–1	14,668
8	W	October 21, 1989	7–2	Minnesota North Stars (1989–90)	3–4–1	15,393
9	L	October 25, 1989	0–2	@ Hartford Whalers (1989–90)	3–5–1	11,831
10	L	October 26, 1989	2–4	@ Boston Bruins (1989–90)	3–6–1	14,084
11	L	October 28, 1989	3–6	Edmonton Oilers (1989–90)	3–7–1	15,399
12	L	October 31, 1989	3–5	Chicago Blackhawks (1989–90)	3–8–1	15,375

November

Game	Result	Date	Score	Opponent	Record	Attendance
13	L	November 2, 1989	1–6	@ New York Rangers (1989–90)	3–9–1	16,364
14	L	November 4, 1989	2–5	St. Louis Blues (1989–90)	3–10–1	14,902
15	L	November 5, 1989	0–3	Washington Capitals (1989–90)	3–11–1	15,323
16	L	November 8, 1989	3–6	@ New Jersey Devils (1989–90)	3–12–1	11,609
17	W	November 9, 1989	7–5	@ New York Islanders (1989–90)	4–12–1	10,307
18	W	November 11, 1989	3–2	Vancouver Canucks (1989–90)	5–12–1	15,396
19	L	November 14, 1989	3–5	Winnipeg Jets (1989–90)	5–13–1	15,220
20	L	November 16, 1989	2–8	@ Pittsburgh Penguins (1989–90)	5–14–1	16,015
21	L	November 18, 1989	1–8	Detroit Red Wings (1989–90)	5–15–1	15,113
22	T	November 21, 1989	4–4 OT	Calgary Flames (1989–90)	5–15–2	14,647
23	W	November 22, 1989	4–2	@ Hartford Whalers (1989–90)	6–15–2	12,723
24	L	November 25, 1989	2–3	Buffalo Sabres (1989–90)	6–16–2	14,847
25	L	November 26, 1989	1–3	@ New York Rangers (1989–90)	6–17–2	15,605
26	L	November 29, 1989	2–5	@ Montreal Canadiens (1989–90)	6–18–2	17,184
27	L	November 30, 1989	2–6	Montreal Canadiens (1989–90)	6–19–2	15,399

December

Game	Result	Date	Score	Opponent	Record	Attendance
28	L	December 2, 1989	4–7	Pittsburgh Penguins (1989–90)	6–20–2	15,020
29	T	December 5, 1989	3–3 OT	Boston Bruins (1989–90)	6–20–3	14,886
30	T	December 9, 1989	6–6 OT	Philadelphia Flyers (1989–90)	6–20–4	15,399
31	L	December 10, 1989	4–8	Los Angeles Kings (1989–90)	6–21–4	15,399
32	L	December 13, 1989	1–5	@ Edmonton Oilers (1989–90)	6–22–4	16,213
33	L	December 14, 1989	2–8	@ Calgary Flames (1989–90)	6–23–4	19,261
34	T	December 17, 1989	2–2 OT	@ Vancouver Canucks (1989–90)	6–23–5	15,232
35	L	December 21, 1989	1–6	@ Los Angeles Kings (1989–90)	6–24–5	15,265
36	L	December 23, 1989	5–6	Buffalo Sabres (1989–90)	6–25–5	14,943
37	T	December 26, 1989	3–3 OT	Hartford Whalers (1989–90)	6–25–6	14,091
38	W	December 30, 1989	6–3	New York Islanders (1989–90)	7–25–6	15,399

January

Game	Result	Date	Score	Opponent	Record	Attendance
39	L	January 3, 1990	4–5	@ Toronto Maple Leafs (1989–90)	7–26–6	16,382
40	L	January 4, 1990	1–4	@ Detroit Red Wings (1989–90)	7–27–6	19,647
41	L	January 6, 1990	2–5	@ New York Islanders (1989–90)	7–28–6	13,526
42	W	January 9, 1990	5–2	Montreal Canadiens (1989–90)	8–28–6	15,399
43	L	January 11, 1990	1–3	@ Boston Bruins (1989–90)	8–29–6	14,207
44	L	January 13, 1990	4–5	New Jersey Devils (1989–90)	8–30–6	14,962
45	W	January 16, 1990	8–6	@ Winnipeg Jets (1989–90)	9–30–6	11,730
46	L	January 18, 1990	4–7	@ Minnesota North Stars (1989–90)	9–31–6	10,877
47	L	January 23, 1990	2–9	Boston Bruins (1989–90)	9–32–6	14,609
48	L	January 24, 1990	3–7	@ Montreal Canadiens (1989–90)	9–33–6	16,907
49	L	January 27, 1990	6–8	Detroit Red Wings (1989–90)	9–34–6	14,836
50	L	January 30, 1990	2–5	Buffalo Sabres (1989–90)	9–35–6	14,777
51	L	January 31, 1990	3–6	@ Buffalo Sabres (1989–90)	9–36–6	16,433

February

Game	Result	Date	Score	Opponent	Record	Attendance
52	L	February 3, 1990	1–5	Hartford Whalers (1989–90)	9–37–6	15,006
53	L	February 4, 1990	2–3	Boston Bruins (1989–90)	9–38–6	14,839
54	L	February 6, 1990	2–12	@ Washington Capitals (1989–90)	9–39–6	15,558
55	L	February 8, 1990	1–5	@ Boston Bruins (1989–90)	9–40–6	14,071
56	L	February 10, 1990	2–7	@ Montreal Canadiens (1989–90)	9–41–6	17,939
57	W	February 13, 1990	5–3	Vancouver Canucks (1989–90)	10–41–6	14,839
58	L	February 15, 1990	2–9	@ St. Louis Blues (1989–90)	10–42–6	15,845
59	L	February 17, 1990	1–7	@ Los Angeles Kings (1989–90)	10–43–6	16,005
60	L	February 21, 1990	2–3	@ Hartford Whalers (1989–90)	10–44–6	13,932
61	L	February 22, 1990	5–6	Montreal Canadiens (1989–90)	10–45–6	15,399
62	L	February 24, 1990	1–6	St. Louis Blues (1989–90)	10–46–6	15,363
63	W	February 26, 1990	3–2	Pittsburgh Penguins (1989–90)	11–46–6	15,109
64	L	February 28, 1990	4–5	@ Toronto Maple Leafs (1989–90)	11–47–6	16,382

March

Game	Result	Date	Score	Opponent	Record	Attendance
65	T	March 3, 1990	3–3 OT	Buffalo Sabres (1989–90)	11–47–7	15,090
66	L	March 4, 1990	3–5	@ Buffalo Sabres (1989–90)	11–48–7	16,433
67	L	March 7, 1990	3–6	@ Winnipeg Jets (1989–90)	11–49–7	11,813
68	L	March 9, 1990	3–4	@ Washington Capitals (1989–90)	11–50–7	16,186
69	L	March 10, 1990	3–9	@ New Jersey Devils (1989–90)	11–51–7	19,040
70	L	March 13, 1990	1–4	Edmonton Oilers (1989–90)	11–52–7	15,174
71	L	March 15, 1990	3–6	Chicago Blackhawks (1989–90)	11–53–7	15,162
72	W	March 17, 1990	6–3	Philadelphia Flyers (1989–90)	12–53–7	14,754
73	L	March 18, 1990	3–8	@ Montreal Canadiens (1989–90)	12–54–7	17,367
74	L	March 21, 1990	1–4	@ Hartford Whalers (1989–90)	12–55–7	12,230
75	L	March 22, 1990	3–7	@ Boston Bruins (1989–90)	12–56–7	14,448
76	L	March 24, 1990	3–4 OT	Toronto Maple Leafs (1989–90)	12–57–7	15,337
77	L	March 27, 1990	4–7	New York Rangers (1989–90)	12–58–7	14,466
78	L	March 29, 1990	2–5	Montreal Canadiens (1989–90)	12–59–7	15,399
79	L	March 31, 1990	2–3	Hartford Whalers (1989–90)	12–60–7	15,015

April

Game	Result	Date	Score	Opponent	Record	Attendance
80	L	April 1, 1990	2–5	@ Buffalo Sabres (1989–90)	12–61–7	16,433

Legend: Win (2 points) Loss (0 points) Tie (1 point)

== Player statistics ==
Regular season
Scoring

Player	Pos	GP	G	A	Pts	PIM	+/-	PPG	SHG	GWG
Joe Sakic	C	80	39	63	102	27	-40	8	1	2
Peter Stastny	C	62	24	38	62	24	-45	10	0	0
Michel Goulet	LW	57	16	29	45	42	-33	8	0	0
Michel Petit	D	63	12	24	36	215	-38	5	0	0
Guy Lafleur	RW	39	12	22	34	4	-15	6	0	2
Marc Fortier	C	59	13	17	30	28	-16	3	1	1
Tony McKegney	LW	48	16	11	27	45	-31	5	0	0
Mike Hough	LW	43	13	13	26	84	-24	3	1	0
Claude Loiselle	C	72	11	14	25	104	-27	0	3	0
Paul Gillis	C	71	8	14	22	234	-24	0	1	0
Jeff Jackson	LW	65	8	12	20	71	-21	0	1	0
Iiro Jarvi	RW	41	7	13	20	18	-11	1	0	1
Joe Cirella	D	56	4	14	18	67	-27	1	0	0
Mario Marois	D	67	3	15	18	104	-45	2	0	0
Lucien DeBlois	C	70	9	8	17	45	-29	1	0	1
Jeff Brown	D	29	6	10	16	18	-14	2	0	3
Ken McRae	C	66	7	8	15	191	-38	0	0	1
Bryan Fogarty	D	45	4	10	14	31	-47	2	0	0
Tony Hrkac	C	22	4	8	12	2	-5	2	0	0
Steven Finn	D	64	3	9	12	208	-33	1	0	0
Brian Lawton	LW	14	5	6	11	10	-9	3	0	0
Darin Kimble	RW	44	5	5	10	185	-20	2	0	1
Curtis Leschyshyn	D	68	2	6	8	44	-41	1	0	0
Everett Sanipass	LW	9	3	3	6	8	-4	2	0	0
Mark Vermette	RW	11	1	5	6	8	-3	0	0	0
Daniel Dore	RW	16	2	3	5	59	-8	1	0	0
Mario Doyon	D	9	2	3	5	6	-1	1	0	0
Robert Picard	D	24	0	5	5	28	-5	0	0	0
Greg Adams	LW	7	1	3	4	17	-2	0	0	0
Craig Wolanin	D	13	0	3	3	10	2	0	0	0
Stephane Morin	C	6	0	2	2	2	1	0	0	0
Jaroslav Sevcik	LW	13	0	2	2	2	-5	0	0	0
Brent Severyn	LW	35	0	2	2	42	-19	0	0	0
Jari Gronstrand	D	7	0	1	1	2	-1	0	0	0
Dan Vincelette	LW	11	0	1	1	25	-6	0	0	0
Jamie Baker	C	1	0	0	0	0	-1	0	0	0
Mario Brunetta	G	6	0	0	0	0	0	0	0	0
Stephane Fiset	G	6	0	0	0	0	0	0	0	0
Scott Gordon	G	10	0	0	0	0	0	0	0	0
Stephane Guerard	D	4	0	0	0	6	-5	0	0	0
Kevin Kaminski	C	1	0	0	0	0	-1	0	0	0
Max Middendorf	RW	3	0	0	0	0	-9	0	0	0
Greg Millen	G	18	0	0	0	0	0	0	0	0
Sergei Mylnikov	G	10	0	0	0	0	0	0	0	0
Jean-Marc Richard	D	1	0	0	0	0	-1	0	0	0
Jean-Marc Routhier	RW	8	0	0	0	9	-3	0	0	0
Greg Smyth	D	13	0	0	0	57	-8	0	0	0
John Tanner	G	1	0	0	0	0	0	0	0	0
Ron Tugnutt	G	35	0	0	0	2	0	0	0	0

Goaltending

Player	MIN	GP	W	L	T	GA	GAA	SO	SA	SV	SV%
Ron Tugnutt	1978	35	5	24	3	152	4.61	0	1080	928	.859
Greg Millen	1080	18	3	14	1	95	5.28	0	648	553	.853
Scott Gordon	597	10	2	8	0	53	5.33	0	368	315	.856
Mario Brunetta	191	6	1	2	0	13	4.08	0	99	86	.869
Sergei Mylnikov	568	10	1	7	2	47	4.96	0	330	283	.858
Stephane Fiset	342	6	0	5	1	34	5.96	0	199	165	.829
John Tanner	60	1	0	1	0	3	3.00	0	30	27	.900
Team:	4816	80	12	61	7	397	4.95	0	2754	2357	.856

Note:

Pos = Position;GP = Games played; G = Goals; A = Assists; Pts = Points; PIM = Penalty minutes; +/- = Plus/minus; PPG = Power-play goals; SHG = Short-handed goals; GWG = Game-winning goals
Pos = Position;GP = Games played; Min, TOI = Minutes played; W = Wins; L = Losses; T,T/OT = Ties; OTL = Overtime losses; GA = Goals-against; GAA = Goals-against average; SO = Shutouts; SA = Shots against; SV = Shots saved;SV% = Save percentage;

== Transactions ==
The Nordiques were involved in the following transactions during the 1989–90 season.

=== Trades ===
June 19, 1989	To Minnesota North Stars Gaetan Duchesne	To Quebec Nordiques Kevin Kaminski
October 5, 1989	To New York Rangers Randy Moller	To Quebec Nordiques Michel Petit
December 4, 1989	To Detroit Red Wings Greg Adams; Robert Picard	To Quebec Nordiques Tony McKegney
December 13, 1989	To St. Louis Blues Jeff Brown	To Quebec Nordiques Tony Hrkac; Greg Millen
March 5, 1990	To Chicago Blackhawks Michel Goulet; Greg Millen; 6th-round pick in 1991 - Kevin St. Jacques	To Quebec Nordiques Mario Doyon; Everett Sanipass; Dan Vincelette
March 6, 1990	To New Jersey Devils Peter Stastny	To Quebec Nordiques Craig Wolanin; Randy Velischek

=== Waivers ===
October 2, 1989	From Vancouver Canucks Greg Adams
November 21, 1989	To New York Islanders Jari Gronstrand
December 1, 1989	From Hartford Whalers Brian Lawton

=== Free agents ===
Player	Former team
Lucien DeBlois	New York Rangers
Guy Lafleur	New York Rangers

Player	New team
Brian Lawton	Boston Bruins

== Draft picks ==
Quebec's draft picks from the 1989 NHL entry draft which was held at the Met Center in Bloomington, Minnesota.

Round	#	Player	Nationality	College/junior/club team (league)
1	1	Mats Sundin	Sweden	Nacka HK (Sweden)
2	22	Adam Foote	Canada	Sault Ste. Marie Greyhounds (OHL)
3	43	Stephane Morin	Canada	Chicoutimi Saguenéens (QMJHL)
3	54	John Tanner	Canada	Peterborough Petes (OHL)
4	68	Niklas Andersson	Sweden	Frölunda HC (Sweden)
4	76	Eric Dubois	Canada	Laval Titan (QMJHL)
5	85	Kevin Kaiser	Canada	Minnesota Duluth Bulldogs (NCAA)
6	106	Dan Lambert	Canada	Swift Current Broncos (WHL)
7	127	Sergei Mylnikov	Soviet Union	Traktor Chelyabinsk (Soviet Union)
8	148	Paul Krake	Canada	Alaska Anchorage Seawolves (NCAA)
9	169	Vyacheslav Bykov	Soviet Union	CSKA Moscow (Soviet Union)
10	190	Andrei Khomutov	Soviet Union	CSKA Moscow (Soviet Union)
11	211	Byron Witkowski	Canada	Nipawin Hawks (SJHL)
12	232	Noel Rahn	United States	Edina High School (USHS)
S	1	Dave DePinto	United States	University of Illinois at Chicago (NCAA)
S	6	Rick Berens	United States	University of Denver (WCAC)

== Farm teams ==
- Halifax Citadels - AHL

== See also ==
- 1989–90 NHL season
