= 1989–90 Philadelphia Flyers season =

NHL hockey team season

1989–90 Philadelphia Flyers
- Division: 6th Patrick
- Conference: 10th Wales
- 1989–90 record: 30–39–11
- Home record: 17–19–4
- Road record: 13–20–7
- Goals for: 290 (10th)
- Goals against: 297 (15th)

Team information
- General manager: Bob Clarke
- Coach: Paul Holmgren
- Captain: Dave Poulin (Oct.–Dec.); Ron Sutter (Dec.–Apr.)
- Alternate captains: Mark Howe; Rick Tocchet
- Arena: Spectrum
- Average attendance: 17,407
- Minor league affiliate: Hershey Bears

Team leaders
- Goals: Rick Tocchet (37)
- Assists: Rick Tocchet (59)
- Points: Rick Tocchet (96)
- Penalty minutes: Craig Berube (291)
- Plus/minus: Mark Howe (+22)
- Wins: Ken Wregget (22)
- Goals against average: Ken Wregget (3.42)

The 1989–90 Philadelphia Flyers season was the franchise's 23rd season in the National Hockey League (NHL). The Flyers missed the playoffs for the first time since 1972, and only the third time in franchise history.

== Regular season ==
The 1989–90 season was one of the most turbulent in franchise history.

Goaltender Ron Hextall had to sit out the first 12-games of the schedule, sentenced after cementing his folk-hero status in the city by crowning Chris Chelios in the waning minutes of Game 6 of the Wales Conference Finals in May. Unfortunately, the layoff plus contract disputes cost him practice time in training camp, and he was felled by groin injuries three separate times during the season.

An ugly 1–6–1 start was reversed despite injuries to Hextall, Brian Propp, Tim Kerr, Mark Howe and others with the team atop the weakened Patrick Division after a win in Montreal just before Christmas.

Little used Tony Horacek posted a hat trick in a 6–3 win in Los Angeles over the Kings on December 30, but the team suffered through a dismal 10-game winless stretch thereafter (0–7–3) from December 31 through January 23. Previous inconsistent play plus the slide cost Dave Poulin his captaincy on December 15, then forced his trade to Boston for former Flyer Ken Linseman. The move did not work, and despite breaking the skid with an 8–6 win against the Jets, Holmgren accused his club of quitting during a 7–2 loss at Washington on January 28 - a defeat which put them three points behind the Capitals in last place.

Newly acquired back-up Pete Peeters had his only season highlight with a 3–0 shutout over Toronto on February 15, but he finished the season 1–13–5. On February 28 in Vancouver, the team was lucky to pull out a 7–7 tie after blowing a 5–2 first-period lead. In the interim, Wells was dealt to the Sabres for unknown winger and future NHL referee Kevin Maguire.

Following an inspired win in Calgary on March 1, Propp was traded to the Bruins, and a four-goal game by Mark Messier in a 5–3 loss to Edmonton two days later triggered a four-game losing streak. The nadir of the late-season collapse came on March 17 in Quebec, as the Flyers allowed three third-period goals to drop a 6–3 decision to the Nordiques (who went on to win all of 12 games that year). Inexplicably, with the Islanders and Penguins also taking late-season dives, the Flyers were still alive for the final playoff spot in the division.

A 5–3 home win over Pittsburgh on March 22 got the team within one point of fourth, but they limped to the end of the schedule with an 0–3–2 record. A 6–2 road loss to the Islanders on March 31 eliminated them from the postseason.

It marked the first time in franchise history that the team finished in last place in any division since its 1967 inception.

Among the bright spots, Tocchet led the team with 37 goals and 96 points. Seven players scored 20-or-more goals. Kerr was limited to 40 games but managed 24 goals and 48 points.

General manager Bob Clarke, having been with the Flyers organization since he was drafted in 1969, was fired on April 16.

=== Season standings ===
Patrick Division
	GP	W	L	T	GF	GA	Pts
**New York Rangers**	80	36	31	13	279	267	85
**New Jersey Devils**	80	37	34	9	295	288	83
**Washington Capitals**	80	36	38	6	284	275	78
**New York Islanders**	80	31	38	11	281	288	73
Pittsburgh Penguins	80	32	40	8	318	359	72
Philadelphia Flyers	80	30	39	11	290	297	71

Note: GP = Games played, W = Wins, L = Losses, T = Ties, Pts = Points, GF = Goals for, GA = Goals against
Note: Teams that qualified for the playoffs are highlighted in bold.

Wales Conference
R		Div	GP	W	L	T	GF	GA	Pts
**1**	**p – Boston Bruins**	**ADM**	**80**	**46**	**25**	**9**	**289**	**232**	**101**
**2**	**Buffalo Sabres**	**ADM**	**80**	**45**	**27**	**8**	**286**	**248**	**98**
**3**	**Montreal Canadiens**	**ADM**	**80**	**41**	**28**	**11**	**288**	**234**	**93**
**4**	**Hartford Whalers**	**ADM**	**80**	**38**	**33**	**9**	**275**	**268**	**85**
**5**	**New York Rangers**	**PTK**	**80**	**36**	**31**	**13**	**279**	**267**	**85**
**6**	**New Jersey Devils**	**PTK**	**80**	**37**	**34**	**9**	**295**	**288**	**83**
**7**	**Washington Capitals**	**PTK**	**80**	**36**	**38**	**6**	**284**	**275**	**78**
**8**	**New York Islanders**	**PTK**	**80**	**31**	**38**	**11**	**281**	**288**	**73**
9	Pittsburgh Penguins	PTK	80	32	40	8	318	359	72
10	Philadelphia Flyers	PTK	80	30	39	11	290	297	71
11	Quebec Nordiques	ADM	80	12	61	7	240	407	31

Divisions: PTK – Patrick, ADM – Adams

bold – Qualified for playoffs; p – Won Presidents' Trophy

=== Record vs. opponents ===
==== Vs. Wales Conference ====
**Vs. Patrick Division**

1989–90 NHL records
Team	**NJD**	**NYI**	**NYR**	**PHI**	**PIT**	**WSH**	**Total**
New Jersey	—	4–1–2	3–3–1	4–2–1	4–2–1	3–4	18–12–5
N.Y. Islanders	1–4–2	—	2–3–2	1–4–2	3–3–1	4–3	11–17–7
N.Y. Rangers	3–3–1	3–2–2	—	5–2	1–5–1	3–4	15–16–4
Philadelphia	2–4–1	4–1–2	2–5	—	4–3	1–5–1	13–18–4
Pittsburgh	2–4–1	3–3–1	5–1–1	3–4	—	5–2	18–14–3
Washington	4–3	3–4	4–3	5–1–1	2–5	—	18–16–1

**Vs. Adams Division**

1989–90 NHL records
Team	**BOS**	**BUF**	**HFD**	**MTL**	**QUE**	**Total**
New Jersey	1–1–1	2–1	1–2	1–2	3–0	8–6–1
N.Y. Islanders	1–1–1	3–0	1–2	1–2	1–2	7–7–1
N.Y. Rangers	3–0	0–2–1	2–1	0–3	3–0	8–6–1
Philadelphia	0–3	1–2	1–2	2–0–1	1–1–1	5–8–2
Pittsburgh	1–2	0–3	0–2–1	1–2	2–1	4–10–1
Washington	1–2	1–1–1	1–2	2–1	3–0	8–6–1

==== Vs. Campbell Conference ====
**Vs. Norris Division**

1989–90 NHL records
Team	**CHI**	**DET**	**MIN**	**STL**	**TOR**	**Total**
New Jersey	2–1	1–1–1	1–2	2–1	1–2	7–7–1
N.Y. Islanders	1–2	1–1–1	1–2	1–2	3–0	7–7–1
N.Y. Rangers	1–0–2	2–0–1	1–1–1	0–2–1	1–1–1	5–4–6
Philadelphia	0–3	0–1–2	2–1	2–1	2–1	6–7–2
Pittsburgh	0–3	2–0–1	1–1–1	0–3	1–2	4–9–2
Washington	1–2	3–0	3–0	0–2–1	1–2	8–6–1

**Vs. Smythe Division**

1989–90 NHL records
Team	**CGY**	**EDM**	**LAK**	**VAN**	**WIN**	**Total**
New Jersey	0–3	1–0–2	2–1	0–3	1–2	4–9–2
N.Y. Islanders	0–3	0–1–2	2–1	2–1	2–1	6–7–2
N.Y. Rangers	1–2	2–0–1	1–2	3–0	1–1–1	8–5–2
Philadelphia	1–1–1	1–2	3–0	0–1–2	1–2	6–6–3
Pittsburgh	0–2–1	2–1	1–2	1–2	2–0–1	6–7–2
Washington	1–0–2	1–2	0–3	0–2–1	0–3	2–10–3

== Schedule and results ==
1989–90 regular season
October: 3–7–1, 7 points (home: 2–3–0; road: 1–4–1)

Game	Date	Score	Opponent	Decision	Record	Points	Recap
1	October 5	2–6	New Jersey Devils	Wregget	0–1–0	0	L
2	October 6	3–5	@ Washington Capitals	Wregget	0–2–0	0	L
3	October 8	3–5	@ Winnipeg Jets	Peeters	0–3–0	0	L
4	October 12	4–2	Quebec Nordiques	Wregget	1–3–0	2	W
5	October 14	3–3 OT	@ New York Islanders	Peeters	1–3–1	3	T
6	October 15	2–3	Calgary Flames	Wregget	1–4–1	3	L
7	October 18	3–5	@ New Jersey Devils	Peeters	1–5–1	3	L
8	October 21	1–3	New York Rangers	Wregget	1–6–1	3	L
9	October 24	6–1	St. Louis Blues	Wregget	2–6–1	5	W
10	October 28	5–6	@ Minnesota North Stars	Wregget	2–7–1	5	L
11	October 30	3–1	@ New York Rangers	Wregget	3–7–1	7	W

November: 9–3–2, 20 points (home: 5–2–1; road: 4–1–1)

Game	Date	Score	Opponent	Decision	Record	Points	Recap
12	November 1	5–5 OT	@ Detroit Red Wings	Peeters	3–7–2	8	T
13	November 4	7–4	@ Toronto Maple Leafs	Hextall	4–7–2	10	W
14	November 5	3–2	New York Islanders	Hoffort	5–7–2	12	W
15	November 9	1–4	Toronto Maple Leafs	Peeters	5–8–2	12	L
16	November 11	7–5	@ New Jersey Devils	Hoffort	6–8–2	14	W
17	November 12	3–3 OT	New Jersey Devils	Hoffort	6–8–3	15	T
18	November 14	5–4	@ New York Islanders	Hextall	7–8–3	17	W
19	November 16	6–3	Minnesota North Stars	Hoffort	8–8–3	19	W
20	November 18	0–1 OT	Winnipeg Jets	Wregget	8–9–3	19	L
21	November 22	5–1	Montreal Canadiens	Wregget	9–9–3	21	W
22	November 24	5–1	Edmonton Oilers	Wregget	10–9–3	23	W
23	November 25	2–5	@ Hartford Whalers	Peeters	10–10–3	23	L
24	November 28	6–3	@ Pittsburgh Penguins	Wregget	11–10–3	25	W
25	November 30	4–1	Pittsburgh Penguins	Wregget	12–10–3	27	W

December: 6–7–2, 14 points (home: 2–5–0; road: 4–2–2)

Game	Date	Score	Opponent	Decision	Record	Points	Recap
26	December 1	3–2	@ Washington Capitals	Wregget	13–10–3	29	W
27	December 3	1–2	Boston Bruins	Wregget	13–11–3	29	L
28	December 5	3–4	Washington Capitals	Wregget	13–12–3	29	L
29	December 7	4–3 OT	Buffalo Sabres	Wregget	14–12–3	31	W
30	December 9	6–6 OT	@ Quebec Nordiques	Wregget	14–12–4	32	T
31	December 10	4–2	@ New York Rangers	Wregget	15–12–4	34	W
32	December 14	2–3	Hartford Whalers	Wregget	15–13–4	34	L
33	December 16	5–2	Los Angeles Kings	Wregget	16–13–4	36	W
34	December 17	3–4	@ Buffalo Sabres	Wregget	16–14–4	36	L
35	December 19	1–2	Washington Capitals	Wregget	16–15–4	36	L
36	December 22	4–5 OT	New Jersey Devils	Wregget	16–16–4	36	L
37	December 23	5–3	@ Montreal Canadiens	Wregget	17–16–4	38	W
38	December 27	1–2	@ Edmonton Oilers	Wregget	17–17–4	38	L
39	December 30	6–3	@ Los Angeles Kings	Wregget	18–17–4	40	W
40	December 31	2–2 OT	@ Vancouver Canucks	Peeters	18–17–5	41	T

January: 2–9–2, 6 points (home: 1–3–0; road: 1–6–2)

Game	Date	Score	Opponent	Decision	Record	Points	Recap
41	January 2	4–4 OT	@ Calgary Flames	Wregget	18–17–6	42	T
42	January 4	4–5 OT	@ St. Louis Blues	Wregget	18–18–6	42	L
43	January 6	5–8	@ Chicago Blackhawks	Peeters	18–19–6	42	L
44	January 11	4–5	Chicago Blackhawks	Wregget	18–20–6	42	L
45	January 13	2–2 OT	@ Montreal Canadiens	Peeters	18–20–7	43	T
46	January 14	3–4 OT	@ New York Rangers	Wregget	18–21–7	43	L
47	January 16	3–4	@ Pittsburgh Penguins	Peeters	18–22–7	43	L
48	January 18	2–3 OT	Vancouver Canucks	Wregget	18–23–7	43	L
49	January 23	2–3	Buffalo Sabres	Wregget	18–24–7	43	L
50	January 25	8–6	Winnipeg Jets	Wregget	19–24–7	45	W
51	January 27	1–2	@ Boston Bruins	Peeters	19–25–7	45	L
52	January 28	2–7	@ Washington Capitals	Wregget	19–26–7	45	L
53	January 30	6–3	@ Pittsburgh Penguins	Wregget	20–26–7	47	W

February: 5–5–2, 12 points (home: 4–2–1; road: 1–3–1)

Game	Date	Score	Opponent	Decision	Record	Points	Recap
54	February 1	2–1	Hartford Whalers	Wregget	21–26–7	49	W
55	February 3	7–6 OT	Minnesota North Stars	Wregget	22–26–7	51	W
56	February 8	5–5 OT	New York Islanders	Wregget	22–26–8	52	T
57	February 11	1–4	Pittsburgh Penguins	Wregget	22–27–8	52	L
58	February 13	3–4	New York Rangers	Peeters	22–28–8	52	L
59	February 15	3–0	Toronto Maple Leafs	Peeters	23–28–8	54	W
60	February 16	6–9	@ Detroit Red Wings	Peeters	23–29–8	54	L
61	February 18	3–2	New York Islanders	Hextall	24–29–8	56	W
62	February 20	4–6	@ Pittsburgh Penguins	Wregget	24–30–8	56	L
63	February 22	7–4	@ St. Louis Blues	Hextall	25–30–8	58	W
64	February 25	1–4	@ Chicago Blackhawks	Hextall	25–31–8	58	L
65	February 28	7–7 OT	@ Vancouver Canucks	Hextall	25–31–9	59	T

March: 5–8–1, 11 points (home: 3–4–1; road: 2–4–0)

Game	Date	Score	Opponent	Decision	Record	Points	Recap
66	March 1	4–2	@ Calgary Flames	Wregget	26–31–9	61	W
67	March 3	3–5	@ Edmonton Oilers	Hextall	26–32–9	61	L
68	March 6	1–2	Boston Bruins	Wregget	26–33–9	61	L
69	March 8	5–7	New York Rangers	Wregget	26–34–9	61	L
70	March 10	3–4	Washington Capitals	Wregget	26–35–9	61	L
71	March 15	5–4	New York Islanders	Wregget	27–35–9	63	W
72	March 17	3–6	@ Quebec Nordiques	Peeters	27–36–9	63	L
73	March 18	7–4	Los Angeles Kings	Wregget	28–36–9	65	W
74	March 20	3–2	@ New Jersey Devils	Wregget	29–36–9	67	W
75	March 22	5–3	Pittsburgh Penguins	Wregget	30–36–9	69	W
76	March 24	2–5	New Jersey Devils	Peeters	30–37–9	69	L
77	March 25	3–7	@ New York Rangers	Peeters	30–38–9	69	L
78	March 29	2–2 OT	Washington Capitals	Peeters	30–38–10	70	T
79	March 31	2–6	@ New York Islanders	Peeters	30–39–10	70	L

April: 0–0–1, 1 points (home: 0–0–1; road: 0–0–0)

Game	Date	Score	Opponent	Decision	Record	Points	Recap
80	April 1	3–3 OT	Detroit Red Wings	Hoffort	30–39–11	71	T

Legend: W Win (2 points) L Loss (0 points) T Tie (1 point)

== Player statistics ==
=== Scoring ===
- Position abbreviations: C = Center; D = Defense; G = Goaltender; LW = Left wing; RW = Right wing
- † = Joined team via a transaction (e.g., trade, waivers, signing) during the season. Stats reflect time with the Flyers only.
- ‡ = Left team via a transaction (e.g., trade, waivers, release) during the season. Stats reflect time with the Flyers only.

No.	Player	Pos	Regular season					
No.	Player	Pos	GP	G	A	Pts	+/-	PIM
22	Rick Tocchet	RW	75	37	59	96	4	196
32	Murray Craven	LW	76	25	50	75	2	42
10	Mike Bullard	C	70	27	37	64	0	67
9	Pelle Eklund	LW	70	23	39	62	7	16
12	Tim Kerr	RW	40	24	24	48	−3	34
14	Ron Sutter	C	75	22	26	48	2	104
23	Ilkka Sinisalo	RW	59	23	23	46	6	26
3	Gord Murphy	D	75	14	27	41	−7	95
26	Brian Propp‡	LW	40	13	15	28	3	31
2	Mark Howe	D	40	7	21	28	22	24
25	Keith Acton	C	69	13	14	27	−2	80
19	Scott Mellanby	RW	57	6	17	23	−4	77
28	Kjell Samuelsson	D	66	5	17	22	20	91
29	Terry Carkner	D	63	4	18	22	−8	169
11 (Note: Latal wore number 62 in his first four games.)	Jiri Latal	D	32	6	13	19	4	6
7	Jay Wells‡	D	59	3	16	19	4	129
17	Craig Berube	LW	74	4	14	18	−7	291
20	Dave Poulin‡	C	28	9	8	17	5	12
18	Ken Linseman†	C	29	5	9	14	−7	30
5	Kerry Huffman	D	43	1	12	13	−3	34
21 (Note: Horacek wore number 43 through November 16.)	Tony Horacek	LW	48	5	5	10	6	117
24	Derrick Smith	LW	55	3	6	9	−15	32
6	Jeff Chychrun	D	79	2	7	9	−12	250
15	Doug Sulliman	RW	28	3	4	7	4	0
8	Murray Baron	D	16	2	2	4	−1	12
46	Don Biggs	C	11	2	0	2	−4	8
18	Brian Dobbin	RW	9	1	1	2	1	11
36 (Note: Lacombe wore number 68 in his first game.)	Normand Lacombe†	RW	18	0	2	2	0	7
35	Ken Wregget	G	51	0	2	2		12
20	Kevin Maguire†	RW	5	1	0	1	−1	6
42	Don Nachbaur	C	2	0	1	1	1	0
33	Pete Peeters	G	24	0	1	1		2
20	Len Barrie†	C	1	0	0	0	−2	0
26 (Note: Fenyves wore number 39 in his first eleven games.)	David Fenyves	D	12	0	0	0	−6	4
7	Craig Fisher	C	2	0	0	0	0	0
37	Mark Freer	C	2	0	0	0	0	0
34	Jeff Harding	RW	9	0	0	0	−1	18
27	Ron Hextall	G	8	0	0	0		14
30	Bruce Hoffort	G	7	0	0	0		2
45	Chris Jensen	RW	1	0	0	0	−1	2
47	Shaun Sabol	D	2	0	0	0	0	0

=== Goaltending ===
No.	Player	Regular season										
No.	Player	GP	GS	W	L	T	SA	GA	GAA	SV%	SO	TOI
35	Ken Wregget	51	50	22	24	3	1557	169	3.42	.891	0	2,961
27	Ron Hextall	8	8	4	2	1	219	29	4.15	.868	0	419
30	Bruce Hoffort	7	4	3	0	2	159	19	3.47	.881	0	329
33	Pete Peeters	24	18	1	13	5	601	72	3.79	.880	1	1,140

== Awards and records ==
=== Awards ===
Type	Award/honor	Recipient	Ref
League (in-season)	NHL All-Star Game selection	Brian Propp (Note: Propp was voted to the starting lineup.)	
League (in-season)	NHL All-Star Game selection	Rick Tocchet	
Team	Barry Ashbee Trophy	Gord Murphy	
Team	Bobby Clarke Trophy	Rick Tocchet	
Team	Class Guy Award	Craig Berube	

=== Records ===
Among the team records set during the 1989–90 season was Rick Tocchet tying the team record for most goals in a regular season game (4) on January 25. The Flyers team record 17 consecutive playoff appearances streak ended with their failure to qualify for the 1990 Stanley Cup playoffs.

=== Milestones ===
Milestone	Player	Date	Ref
First game	Murray Baron	October 5, 1989	
First game	Tony Horacek	October 8, 1989	
First game	Shaun Sabol	November 4, 1989	
First game	Bruce Hoffort	November 5, 1989	
First game	Jiri Latal	November 5, 1989	
First game	Len Barrie	February 28, 1990	
First game	Craig Fisher	March 24, 1990	

== Transactions ==
The Flyers were involved in the following transactions from May 26, 1989, the day after the deciding game of the 1989 Stanley Cup Final, through May 24, 1990, the day of the deciding game of the 1990 Stanley Cup Final.

=== Trades ===
Date	Details		Ref
July 21, 1989	To Philadelphia Flyers: Future considerations	To Winnipeg Jets: Shawn Cronin	
August 28, 1989	To Philadelphia Flyers: Rights to Jiri Latal	To Toronto Maple Leafs: 7th-round pick in 1991	
September 8, 1989	To Philadelphia Flyers: 5th-round pick in 1991; Philadelphia's 7th-round pick in 1991	To Toronto Maple Leafs: Mark Laforest	
September 28, 1989	To Philadelphia Flyers: Future considerations	To Winnipeg Jets: Keith Acton; Pete Peeters	
October 3, 1989	To Philadelphia Flyers: Keith Acton; Pete Peeters	To Winnipeg Jets: Toronto's 5th-round pick in 1991; Future considerations	
January 5, 1990	To Philadelphia Flyers: Normand Lacombe	To Edmonton Oilers: 4th-round pick in 1990 or 1991 (Note: The Oilers had the choice of year. The Oilers chose the 1990 draft pick.)	
January 16, 1990	To Philadelphia Flyers: Ken Linseman	To Boston Bruins: Dave Poulin	
March 2, 1990	To Philadelphia Flyers: 2nd-round pick in 1990	To Boston Bruins: Brian Propp	
March 5, 1990	To Philadelphia Flyers: Kevin Maguire; 2nd-round pick in 1990	To Buffalo Sabres: Jay Wells; 4th-round pick in 1991	

=== Players acquired ===
Date	Player	Former team	Term	Via	Ref
June 12, 1989	Shawn Cronin	Washington Capitals		Free agency	
June 16, 1989	Pete Peeters	Washington Capitals	2-year (Note: Option for third year)	Free agency	
June 30, 1989	Bruce Hoffort	Lake Superior State University (WCHA)	3-year	Free agency	
July 12, 1989	Tim Tookey	Pittsburgh Penguins		Free agency	
February 27, 1990	Len Barrie	Kamloops Blazers (WHL)		Free agency	

=== Players lost ===
Date	Player	New team	Via	Ref
N/A	Glen Seabrooke		Retirement	
July 12, 1989	Al Hill		Retirement	
August 7, 1989	Al Secord	Chicago Blackhawks	Free agency	
October 2, 1989	Nick Kypreos	Washington Capitals	Waiver draft	
October 2, 1989	Moe Mantha	Winnipeg Jets	Waiver draft	

=== Signings ===
Date	Player	Term	Ref
June 17, 1989	Pelle Eklund	3-year	
August 28, 1989	Jiri Latal		
September 11, 1989	Ken Wregget	1-year	
December 1, 1989	Mark Howe	3-year	
December 1, 1989	Derrick Smith	multi-year	
December 27, 1989	Steve Scheifele	multi-year	
March 5, 1990	Craig Fisher		

== Draft picks ==
=== NHL entry draft ===
Philadelphia's picks at the 1989 NHL entry draft, which was held at the Met Center in Bloomington, Minnesota, on June 17, 1989. The Flyers' first-round pick, 12th overall, was traded to the Toronto Maple Leafs along with the Calgary Flames' first-round pick, 21st overall, for Ken Wregget on March 6, 1989. They also traded their third-round pick, 54th overall, and Greg Smyth to the Quebec Nordiques for Terry Carkner on July 25, 1988, their fourth-round pick, 75th overall, to the Minnesota North Stars for Gordie Roberts on February 9, 1988, and their fifth-round pick, 96th overall, to the Toronto Maple Leafs for Al Secord on February 7, 1989.

Round	Pick	Player	Position	Nationality	Team (league)	Notes
2	33	Greg Johnson	Center	Canada	Thunder Bay Flyers (USHL)	
2	34	Patrik Juhlin	Left wing	Sweden	Vasteras IK (Elitserien)	(Note: The Flyers traded Bob Froese to the New York Rangers for Kjell Samuelsson and Rangers' second-round pick, 34th overall, on December 18, 1986.)
4	72	Reid Simpson	Left wing	Canada	Prince Albert Raiders (WHL)	(Note: The Flyers traded Gordie Roberts to the St. Louis Blues for the Blues' fifth-round pick, later upgraded to the Blues' fourth-round pick, 72nd overall, on March 8, 1988)
6	117	Niklas Eriksson	Right wing	Sweden	Leksands IF (Elitserien)	
7	138	John Callahan	Center	United States	Belmont Hill School (Mass.)	
8	159	Sverre Sears	Defense	United States	Belmont Hill School (Mass.)	
9	180	Glen Wisser	Forward	United States	Philadelphia Junior Flyers (Jr. B)	
10	201	Al Kummu	Defense	Canada	Humboldt Broncos (SJHL)	
11	222	Matt Brait	Defense	United States	St. Michael's Buzzers (MetJHL)	
12	243	James Pollio	Left wing	United States	Vermont Academy (Vermont)	

=== NHL supplemental draft ===
Philadelphia's picks at the 1989 NHL supplemental draft.

Round	Pick	Player	Position	Nationality	Team (league)
2	17	Jamie Baker	Defense	United States	University of Windsor (CIAU)

== Farm teams ==
The Flyers were affiliated with the Hershey Bears of the AHL.
