= 1989–90 Chicago Blackhawks season =

National Hockey League team season

1989–90 Chicago Blackhawks
- Norris Division champions
- Division: 1st Norris
- Conference: 2nd Campbell
- 1989–90 record: 41–33–6
- Home record: 25–13–2
- Road record: 16–20–4
- Goals for: 316
- Goals against: 294

Team information
- General manager: Bob Pulford
- Coach: Mike Keenan
- Captain: Dirk Graham
- Alternate captains: Keith Brown; Steve Larmer; Denis Savard; Doug Wilson
- Arena: Chicago Stadium

Team leaders
- Goals: Steve Thomas (40)
- Assists: Steve Larmer (59)
- Points: Steve Larmer (90)
- Penalty minutes: Wayne Van Dorp (303)
- Wins: Jacques Cloutier (18)
- Goals against average: Jacques Cloutier (3.09)

The 1989–90 Chicago Blackhawks season was the Hawks' 64th season. The season involved winning the Norris Division.

== Offseason ==
The Blackhawks brought 1970s Soviet star goaltender Vladislav Tretiak to Chicago to help improve their netminders. The biggest offseason trade was a September 1990 deal sending Steve Ludzik to the Sabres for goalie Jacques Cloutier.

=== NHL draft ===
Chicago's draft picks at the 1989 NHL entry draft held at the Met Center in Bloomington, Minnesota.

Round	#	Player	Nationality	College/Junior/Club team (League)
1	6	Adam Bennett	Canada	Sudbury Wolves (OHL)
2	27	Mike Speer	Canada	Guelph Platers (OHL)
3	48	Bob Kellogg	United States	Springfield Olympics (EJHL)
6	111	Tommi Pullola	Finland	Sport (Finland)
7	132	Tracy Egeland	Canada	Prince Albert Raiders (WHL)
8	153	Milan Tichy	Czechoslovakia	Prince Albert Raiders (WHL)
9	174	Jason Greyerbiehl	Canada	Colgate University (ECAC)
10	195	Matt Saunders	Canada	Northeastern University (Hockey East)
11	216	Mike Kozak	Canada	Clarkson University (ECAC)
12	237	Mike Doneghey	United States	Catholic Memorial School (USHS-MA)
S	11	Alex Roberts	United States	University of Michigan (CCHA)

== Regular season ==
The Blackhawks would play consistent hockey all season as they win the Norris Division with a record of 41–33–6.

Offensively, Steve Larmer again led the team with 59 assists and 90 points. Steve Thomas led the team in goals with 40. Dennis Savard was second in points with 80 and assists with 53. Jeremey Roenick finished his first full year with 26 goals and 40 assists for 66 points. Doug Wilson had an outstanding year with 23 goals, 50 assists for a team third-best 73 points. Dave Manson was again second-highest defenseman in scoring with 28 points. On November 2, 1989, Doug Wilson scored just 18 seconds into the overtime period to give the Blackhawks a 4–3 home win over the Minnesota North Stars. It would prove to be the fastest overtime goal scored during the 1989-90 NHL regular season.

In goal, while Alain Chevrier took the Blackhawks to the Conference finals the year before, his 16–14–3 record and 4.18 Goals Against Average in 89–90 got him traded in March 1990. Jacques Cloutier who was acquired just before the season began, was the primary goaltender with an 18–15–2 record and a 3.09 Goals Against Average. In March, the Blackhawks acquired Greg Millen from Quebec, and he began to take over in the nets at the end of the season with a 5–4–1 record. Eddie Belfour could not make the Hawks roster and instead spent six months with the Canadian national team.

=== Final standings ===
Norris Division
	GP	W	L	T	GF	GA	Pts
**Chicago Blackhawks**	80	41	33	6	315	294	88
**St. Louis Blues**	80	37	34	9	295	279	83
**Toronto Maple Leafs**	80	38	38	4	337	358	80
**Minnesota North Stars**	80	36	40	4	284	291	76
Detroit Red Wings	80	28	38	14	288	323	70

Note: GP = Games played, W = Wins, L = Losses, T = Ties, Pts = Points, GF = Goals for, GA = Goals against
Note: Teams that qualified for the playoffs are highlighted in bold.

Campbell Conference
R		Div	GP	W	L	T	GF	GA	Pts
**1**	**Calgary Flames**	**SMY**	**80**	**42**	**23**	**15**	**348**	**265**	**99**
**2**	**Edmonton Oilers**	**SMY**	**80**	**38**	**28**	**14**	**315**	**283**	**90**
**3**	**Chicago Blackhawks**	**NRS**	**80**	**41**	**33**	**6**	**316**	**294**	**88**
**4**	**Winnipeg Jets**	**SMY**	**80**	**37**	**32**	**11**	**298**	**290**	**85**
**5**	**St. Louis Blues**	**NRS**	**80**	**37**	**34**	**9**	**295**	**279**	**83**
**6**	**Toronto Maple Leafs**	**NRS**	**80**	**38**	**38**	**4**	**337**	**358**	**80**
**7**	**Minnesota North Stars**	**NRS**	**80**	**36**	**40**	**4**	**284**	**291**	**76**
**8**	**Los Angeles Kings**	**SMY**	**80**	**34**	**39**	**7**	**338**	**337**	**75**
9	Detroit Red Wings	NRS	80	28	38	14	288	323	70
10	Vancouver Canucks	SMY	80	25	41	14	245	306	64

Divisions: NRS – Norris, SMY – Smythe

bold – Qualified for playoffs

=== Record vs. opponents ===
==== Vs. Campbell Conference ====
Vs. Norris Division

1989–90 NHL records
Team	CHI	DET	MIN	STL	TOR	Total
Chicago	—	4–3–1	3–4–1	2–5–1	5–3	**14–15–3**
Detroit	3–4–1	—	4–4	3–4–1	4–3–1	**14–15–3**
Minnesota	4–3–1	4–4	—	4–4	5–3	**17–14–1**
St. Louis	5–2–1	4–3–1	4–4	—	1–7	**14–16–2**
Toronto	3–5	3–4–1	3–5	7–1	—	**16–15–1**

Vs. Smythe Division

1989–90 NHL records
Team	CGY	EDM	LAK	VAN	WIN	Total
Chicago	0–2–1	2–1	2–1	2–1	2–1	**8–6–1**
Detroit	2–1	2–1	1–2	1–1–1	1–1–1	**7–6–2**
Minnesota	1–2	0–3	2–1	1–2	2–1	**6–9–0**
St. Louis	0–2–1	0–2–1	1–2	2–1	1–1–1	**4–8–3**
Toronto	1–2	2–1	2–1	2–1	0–2–1	**7–7–1**

Vs. Wales Conference

Vs. Adams Division

1989–90 NHL records
Team	BOS	BUF	HFD	MTL	QUE	Total
Chicago	0–3	2–1	2–1	2–1	2–1	**8–7–0**
Detroit	0–3	1–2	0–2–1	0–1–2	3–0	**4–8–3**
Minnesota	1–2	1–1–1	1–2	1–2	2–1	**6–8–1**
St. Louis	1–2	2–1	2–1	0–1–2	3–0	**8–5–2**
Toronto	1–2	1–2	1–1–1	1–2	3–0	**7–7–1**

Vs. Patrick Division

1989–90 NHL records
Team	NJD	NYI	NYR	PHI	PIT	WSH	Total
Chicago	1–2	2–1	0–1–2	3–0	3–0	2–1	**11–5–2**
Detroit	1–1–1	1–1–1	0–2–1	1–0–2	0–2–1	0–3	**3–9–6**
Minnesota	2–1	2–1	1–1–1	1–2	1–1–1	0–3	**7–9–2**
St. Louis	1–2	2–1	2–0–1	1–2	3–0	2–0–1	**11–5–2**
Toronto	2–1	0–3	1–1–1	1–2	2–1	2–1	**8–9–1**

== Schedule and results ==
1989–90 regular season
October

Game	Result	Date	Score	Opponent	Record
1	L	October 5, 1989	3–8	St. Louis Blues (1989–90)	0–1–0
2	W	October 7, 1989	3–2	@ Washington Capitals (1989–90)	1–1–0
3	L	October 8, 1989	3–5	New York Rangers (1989–90)	1–2–0
4	W	October 12, 1989	9–6	Toronto Maple Leafs (1989–90)	2–2–0
5	L	October 14, 1989	1–2	@ St. Louis Blues (1989–90)	2–3–0
6	W	October 15, 1989	3–0	Detroit Red Wings (1989–90)	3–3–0
7	T	October 17, 1989	3–3 OT	@ New York Rangers (1989–90)	3–3–1
8	L	October 19, 1989	3–5	Quebec Nordiques (1989–90)	3–4–1
9	W	October 20, 1989	4–2	@ Winnipeg Jets (1989–90)	4–4–1
10	W	October 22, 1989	7–4	Los Angeles Kings (1989–90)	5–4–1
11	W	October 24, 1989	5–3	@ Detroit Red Wings (1989–90)	6–4–1
12	W	October 26, 1989	5–3	Montreal Canadiens (1989–90)	7–4–1
13	L	October 28, 1989	2–3	@ New Jersey Devils (1989–90)	7–5–1
14	W	October 29, 1989	1–0	Washington Capitals (1989–90)	8–5–1
15	W	October 31, 1989	5–3	@ Quebec Nordiques (1989–90)	9–5–1

November

Game	Result	Date	Score	Opponent	Record
16	W	November 2, 1989	4–3 OT	Minnesota North Stars (1989–90)	10–5–1
17	L	November 4, 1989	0–3	@ Minnesota North Stars (1989–90)	10–6–1
18	W	November 5, 1989	4–3 OT	Winnipeg Jets (1989–90)	11–6–1
19	W	November 9, 1989	4–3	Pittsburgh Penguins (1989–90)	12–6–1
20	W	November 11, 1989	5–3	@ New York Islanders (1989–90)	13–6–1
21	W	November 12, 1989	4–2	Hartford Whalers (1989–90)	14–6–1
22	L	November 16, 1989	3–4	@ Vancouver Canucks (1989–90)	14–7–1
23	T	November 18, 1989	4–4 OT	@ Calgary Flames (1989–90)	14–7–2
24	L	November 19, 1989	4–5 OT	@ Edmonton Oilers (1989–90)	14–8–2
25	L	November 22, 1989	3–6	@ Los Angeles Kings (1989–90)	14–9–2
26	L	November 26, 1989	3–5	@ Minnesota North Stars (1989–90)	14–10–2
27	L	November 30, 1989	0–2	New York Islanders (1989–90)	14–11–2

December

Game	Result	Date	Score	Opponent	Record
28	L	December 3, 1989	3–4	Detroit Red Wings (1989–90)	14–12–2
29	W	December 6, 1989	6–4	Toronto Maple Leafs (1989–90)	15–12–2
30	W	December 9, 1989	6–4	@ Pittsburgh Penguins (1989–90)	16–12–2
31	W	December 10, 1989	7–1	Vancouver Canucks (1989–90)	17–12–2
32	W	December 13, 1989	3–1	@ Montreal Canadiens (1989–90)	18–12–2
33	L	December 15, 1989	4–8	@ Detroit Red Wings (1989–90)	18–13–2
34	W	December 17, 1989	6–5	Edmonton Oilers (1989–90)	19–13–2
35	W	December 20, 1989	9–6	St. Louis Blues (1989–90)	20–13–2
36	L	December 22, 1989	3–5	Toronto Maple Leafs (1989–90)	20–14–2
37	W	December 23, 1989	7–5	@ Toronto Maple Leafs (1989–90)	21–14–2
38	L	December 26, 1989	3–8	@ St. Louis Blues (1989–90)	21–15–2
39	T	December 28, 1989	1–1 OT	Minnesota North Stars (1989–90)	21–15–3
40	W	December 30, 1989	7–3	Hartford Whalers (1989–90)	22–15–3

January

Game	Result	Date	Score	Opponent	Record
41	W	January 3, 1990	3–2	Edmonton Oilers (1989–90)	23–15–3
42	W	January 6, 1990	8–5	Philadelphia Flyers (1989–90)	24–15–3
43	T	January 10, 1990	2–2 OT	@ New York Rangers (1989–90)	24–15–4
44	W	January 11, 1990	5–4	@ Philadelphia Flyers (1989–90)	25–15–4
45	L	January 14, 1990	5–6	Calgary Flames (1989–90)	25–16–4
46	L	January 15, 1990	6–7	@ Toronto Maple Leafs (1989–90)	25–17–4
47	W	January 17, 1990	3–1	Minnesota North Stars (1989–90)	26–17–4
48	W	January 19, 1990	5–2	Vancouver Canucks (1989–90)	27–17–4
49	L	January 24, 1990	2–3	Buffalo Sabres (1989–90)	27–18–4
50	W	January 26, 1990	4–2	@ Buffalo Sabres (1989–90)	28–18–4
51	L	January 27, 1990	4–6	@ Hartford Whalers (1989–90)	28–19–4

February

Game	Result	Date	Score	Opponent	Record
52	W	February 1, 1990	7–4	@ Los Angeles Kings (1989–90)	29–19–4
53	L	February 4, 1990	3–7	@ Winnipeg Jets (1989–90)	29–20–4
54	W	February 8, 1990	8–6	@ Detroit Red Wings (1989–90)	30–20–4
55	L	February 10, 1990	4–6	@ Minnesota North Stars (1989–90)	30–21–4
56	W	February 13, 1990	4–1	Buffalo Sabres (1989–90)	31–21–4
57	L	February 15, 1990	1–4	Calgary Flames (1989–90)	31–22–4
58	W	February 17, 1990	3–1	@ New York Islanders (1989–90)	32–22–4
59	W	February 18, 1990	6–4	Pittsburgh Penguins (1989–90)	33–22–4
60	W	February 20, 1990	8–3	@ St. Louis Blues (1989–90)	34–22–4
61	L	February 22, 1990	3–6	Boston Bruins (1989–90)	34–23–4
62	L	February 24, 1990	2–3	@ New Jersey Devils (1989–90)	34–24–4
63	W	February 25, 1990	4–1	Philadelphia Flyers (1989–90)	35–24–4
64	L	February 27, 1990	0–4	@ Washington Capitals (1989–90)	35–25–4

March

Game	Result	Date	Score	Opponent	Record
65	L	March 1, 1990	4–6	St. Louis Blues (1989–90)	35–26–4
66	L	March 3, 1990	3–4	@ Boston Bruins (1989–90)	35–27–4
67	L	March 4, 1990	1–4	Boston Bruins (1989–90)	35–28–4
68	L	March 7, 1990	4–5	@ Minnesota North Stars (1989–90)	35–29–4
69	T	March 10, 1990	2–2 OT	@ St. Louis Blues (1989–90)	35–29–5
70	L	March 11, 1990	4–6	St. Louis Blues (1989–90)	35–30–5
71	T	March 13, 1990	3–3 OT	Detroit Red Wings (1989–90)	35–30–6
72	W	March 15, 1990	6–3	@ Quebec Nordiques (1989–90)	36–30–6
73	L	March 17, 1990	2–3 OT	@ Montreal Canadiens (1989–90)	36–31–6
74	W	March 19, 1990	3–2	@ Toronto Maple Leafs (1989–90)	37–31–6
75	W	March 22, 1990	6–3	New Jersey Devils (1989–90)	38–31–6
76	L	March 24, 1990	3–5	@ Detroit Red Wings (1989–90)	38–32–6
77	W	March 25, 1990	3–2	Detroit Red Wings (1989–90)	39–32–6
78	W	March 29, 1990	4–2	Toronto Maple Leafs (1989–90)	40–32–6
79	L	March 31, 1990	4–6	@ Toronto Maple Leafs (1989–90)	40–33–6

April

Game	Result	Date	Score	Opponent	Record
80	W	April 1, 1990	4–1	Minnesota North Stars (1989–90)	41–33–6

Legend: Win (2 points) Loss (0 points) Tie (1 point)

== Player stats ==
=== Regular season ===
Scoring

Player	Pos	GP	G	A	Pts	PIM	+/-	PPG	SHG	GWG
Steve Larmer	RW	80	31	59	90	40	25	8	2	4
Denis Savard	C	60	27	53	80	56	8	10	2	4
Doug Wilson	D	70	23	50	73	40	13	13	1	2
Steve Thomas	LW	76	40	30	70	91	-3	13	0	7
Adam Creighton	C	80	34	36	70	224	4	12	0	3
Jeremy Roenick	C	78	26	40	66	54	2	6	0	4
Troy Murray	C	68	17	38	55	86	-2	3	1	4
Dirk Graham	W	73	22	32	54	102	1	2	3	1
Greg Gilbert	LW	70	12	25	37	54	27	0	0	3
Dave Manson	D	59	5	23	28	301	4	1	0	1
Keith Brown	D	67	5	20	25	87	26	2	0	0
Bob Murray	D	49	5	19	24	45	3	3	0	1
Al Secord	LW	43	14	7	21	131	5	1	0	0
Jocelyn Lemieux	RW	39	10	11	21	47	0	1	0	1
Mike Hudson	C/LW	49	9	12	21	56	-3	0	0	3
Trent Yawney	D	70	5	15	20	82	-6	1	0	1
Duane Sutter	RW	72	4	14	18	156	-2	0	0	1
Steve Konroyd	D	75	3	14	17	34	6	1	0	0
Wayne Presley	RW	49	6	7	13	69	-19	1	0	0
Bob McGill	D	69	2	10	12	204	-7	0	1	0
Wayne Van Dorp	LW	61	7	4	11	303	-3	0	0	1
Michel Goulet	LW	8	4	1	5	9	1	1	1	0
Everett Sanipass	LW	12	2	2	4	17	0	0	0	0
Mike Eagles	C/LW	23	1	2	3	34	-4	0	0	0
Bob Bassen	C	6	1	1	2	8	1	0	0	0
Bruce Cassidy	D	2	1	1	2	0	-1	1	0	0
Alain Chevrier	G	39	0	2	2	6	0	0	0	0
Brian Noonan	RW	8	0	2	2	6	0	0	0	0
Greg Millen	G	10	0	1	1	0	0	0	0	0
Cam Russell	D	19	0	1	1	27	-3	0	0	0
Jacques Cloutier	G	43	0	0	0	8	0	0	0	0
Mike Peluso	LW	2	0	0	0	15	0	0	0	0
Dan Vincelette	LW	2	0	0	0	4	-1	0	0	0
Jimmy Waite	G	4	0	0	0	0	0	0	0	0

Goaltending

Player	MIN	GP	W	L	T	GA	GAA	SO	SA	SV	SV%
Jacques Cloutier	2178	43	18	15	2	112	3.09	2	931	819	.880
Alain Chevrier	1894	39	16	14	3	132	4.18	0	898	766	.853
Greg Millen	575	10	5	4	1	32	3.34	0	267	235	.880
Jimmy Waite	183	4	2	0	0	14	4.59	0	92	78	.848
Team:	4830	80	41	33	6	290	3.60	2	2188	1898	.867

=== Playoffs ===
After reaching the Conference finals the year before, hopes were high entering the playoffs. The first round reunited the Hawks with their old rivals, the Minnesota North Stars for the first time since their four-year consecutive playoff match streak ended in 1985. The playoff format had changed since then, and now featured a seven-game series. The Blackhawks would barely survive this seven game war with the fourth place Minnesota North Stars. The Hawks defeated the North Stars four games to three with the Hawks outscoring Minnesota by a total of three goals over the series.

April 4	Minnesota North Stars	2–1	Chicago Blackhawks	Chicago Stadium	Recap
Brian Bellows (1) – pp – 09:57		First period	No scoring
No scoring		Second period	No scoring
Brian Bellows (2) – 05:54		Third period	05:01 – pp – Denis Savard (1)
Jon Casey 30 saves / 31 shots		Goalie stats	Greg Millen 24 saves / 26 shots

April 6	Minnesota North Stars	3–5	Chicago Blackhawks	Chicago Stadium	Recap
Brian Bellows (3) – pp – 08:49; Shawn Chambers (1) – pp – 10:41; Neal Broten (1) – pp – 11:56		First period	14:24 – pp – Wayne Presley (1)
No Scoring		Second period	01:49 – Greg Gilbert (1); 03:53 – pp – Jeremy Roenick (1); 07:27 – pp – Steve Thomas (1); 16:39 – sh – Wayne Presley (2)
No Scoring		Third period	No Scoring
Jon Casey 26 saves / 31 shots		Goalie stats	Ed Belfour 15 saves / 15 shots Greg Millen 2 saves / 5 shots

April 8	Chicago Blackhawks	2–1	Minnesota North Stars	Met Center	Recap
No scoring		First period	No scoring
No scoring		Second period	No scoring
10:12 – Steve Larmer (1); 15:27 – Wayne Presley (3)		Third period	Mike Modano (1) – 19:24
Greg Millen 31 saves / 32 shots		Goalie stats	Jon Casey 27 saves / 29 shots

April 10	Chicago Blackhawks	0–4	Minnesota North Stars	Met Center	Recap
No scoring		First period	04:24 – Don Barber (1); 11:41 – pp – Don Barber (2)
No scoring		Second period	07:42 – Basil McRae (1)
No scoring		Third period	03:41 – Dave Gagner (1)
Ed Belfour 26 saves / 28 shots Greg Millen 10 saves / 12 shots		Goalie stats	Jon Casey 29 saves / 29 shots

April 12	Minnesota North Stars	1–5	Chicago Blackhawks	Chicago Stadium	Recap
No scoring		First period	10:17 – pp – Jeremy Roenick (2); 13:26 – Denis Savard (2)
Brian Bellows (4) – pp – 09:24		Second period	04:53 – Greg Gilbert (2)
No scoring		Third period	16:37 – Michel Goulet (1); 17:48 – Steve Thomas
Jon Casey 31 saves / 36 shots		Goalie stats	Greg Millen 26 saves / 27 shots

April 14	Chicago Blackhawks	3–5	Minnesota North Stars	Met Center	Recap
Greg Gilbert (3) – 12:33		First period	10:28 – Shawn Chambers (2); 17:25 – Perry Berezan (1); 18:48 – Neal Broten (2)
No scoring		Second period	01:26 – Larry Murphy (1); 14:20 – pp – Dave Gagner (2)
Steve Larmer (2) – sh – 12:57; Jeremy Roenick (3) – 13:57		Third period	No scoring
Ed Belfour 31 saves / 33 shots Greg Millen 7 saves / 10 shots		Goalie stats	Jon Casey 27 saves / 30 shots

April 16	Minnesota North Stars	2–5	Chicago Blackhawks	Chicago Stadium	Recap
Don Barber (3) – pp – 09:02		First period	No scoring
No scoring		Second period	03:00 – Wayne Presley (4); 04:06 – Wayne Presley (5); 12:41 – Jeremy Roenick (4); 14:06 – Jeremy Roenick (5)
Ulf Dahlen (1) – 09:58		Third period	17:10 – Greg Gilbert (4)
Jon Casey 28 saves / 33 shots Kari Takko 0 saves / 0 shots		Goalie stats	Greg Millen 30 saves / 32 shots

Chicago won series 4–3

The second round Norris Division Finals, saw the Blackhawks pitted against the St. Louis Blues. The Blackhawks again needed all seven games to advance. In a bold move, coach Mike Keenan decided to start Ed Belfour, who was recently recalled from the minors, in net in three of the games, and Eddie the Eagle won all three. The first six games were decided by one or two goals each, and game seven in Chicago was set for another close battle, however after Jeremy Roenick gave the Hawks a 2–0 first period lead, the Blues went on a powerplay only to have Steve Larmer score a demoralizing shorthanded goal, and the rout was on - resulting in 8–2 victory. The Blackhawks were again headed to the conference finals against the Edmonton Oilers. Unlike their previous playoff loses to Edmonton, this time the Oilers were without Wayne Gretzky.)

April 18	St. Louis Blues	4–3	Chicago Blackhawks	Chicago Stadium	Recap
Rod Brind'Amour (3) – 05:42; Rick Meagher (1) – 18:58		First period	09:26 – Doug Wilson (1)
Rod Brind'Amour (4) – 06:05; Brett Hull (6) – 10:59		Second period	13:43 – pp – Trent Yawney (1); 18:24 – Adam Creighton (1)
No scoring		Third period	No scoring
Vincent Riendeau 29 saves / 32 shots		Goalie stats	Ed Belfour 13 saves / 13 shots Greg Millen 9 saves / 13 shots

April 20	St. Louis Blues	3–5	Chicago Blackhawks	Chicago Stadium	Recap
No scoring		First period	12:39 – pp – Steve Larmer (3)
Brett Hull (7) – 00:35		Second period	06:18 – Wayne Presley (6)
Brett Hull (8) – pp – 07:06; Paul Cavallini (2) – 14:34		Third period	08:37 – pp – Troy Murray (1); 08:47 – Steve Thomas (3); 19:46 – Jeremy Roenick (6)
Vincent Riendeau 24 saves / 28 shots		Goalie stats	Greg Millen 24 saves / 27 shots

April 22	Chicago Blackhawks	4–5	St. Louis Blues	St. Louis Arena	Recap
Doug Wilson (2) – pp – 02:12		First period	00:18 – Sergio Momesso (3); 16:46 – pp – Brett Hull (9)
Dave Manson (1) – 04:38		Second period	09:42 – pp – Jeff Brown (2)
Bob Murray (1) – 12:26; Steve Thomas (4) – 14:38		Third period	15:24 – Brett Hull (10); 19:51 – Gino Cavallini (1)
Greg Millen 23 saves / 28 shots		Goalie stats	Vincent Riendeau 44 saves / 48 shots

April 24	Chicago Blackhawks	3–2	St. Louis Blues	St. Louis Arena	Recap
No scoring		First period	No scoring
Wayne Presley (7) – 02:06; Michel Goulet (2) – 02:42; Trent Yawney (2) – pp – 18:09		Second period	12:53 – Rod Brind'Amour (5)
No scoring		Third period	05:26 – pp – Ron Wilson (3)
Ed Belfour 31 saves / 33 shots		Goalie stats	Vincent Riendeau 22 saves / 25 shots

April 26	St. Louis Blues	2–3	Chicago Blackhawks	Chicago Stadium	Recap
Adam Oates (1) – pp – 14:05		First period	No scoring
Brett Hull (11) – pp – 14:33		Second period	03:56 – Jocelyn Lemieux (1); 04:59 – Troy Murray (2); 06:12 – Steve Thomas (5)
No scoring		Third period	No scoring
Vincent Riendeau 29 saves / 32 shots		Goalie stats	Ed Belfour 18 saves / 20 shots

April 28	Chicago Blackhawks	2–4	St. Louis Blues	St. Louis Arena	Recap
No scoring		First period	01:36 – pp – Brett Hull (12); 02:30 – Dave Lowry (2)
Denis Savard (3) – pp – 07:39; Jeremy Roenick (7) – pp – 14:32		Second period	15:18 – Brett Hull (13)
No scoring		Third period	11:07 – Rich Sutter (2)
Jacques Cloutier 24 saves / 26 shots Ed Belfour 0 saves / 2 shots		Goalie stats	Vincent Riendeau 37 saves / 39 shots

April 30	St. Louis Blues	2–8	Chicago Blackhawks	Chicago Stadium	Recap
No scoring		First period	02:47 – Jeremy Roenick (8); 13:03 – Jeremy Roenick (9)
Paul MacLean (4) – pp – 12:06		Second period	03:03 – sh – Steve Larmer (4); 07:28 – Denis Savard (4); 10:22 – pp – Dave Manson (2)
Adam Oates (2) – 17:19		Third period	00:35 – Greg Gilbert (5); 03:45 – sh – Adam Creighton (2); 19:49 – Duane Sutter (1)
Curtis Joseph 10 saves / 14 shots Vincent Riendeau 11 saves / 15 shots		Goalie stats	Ed Belfour 26 saves / 28 shots

Chicago won series 4–3

The Western Conference Finals saw Keenan go back to Millen and Cloutier in the nets with Belfour only appearing in the first game despite his 2.49 goals against average. After splitting the first two in the Edmonton, the Hawks took the first home game at the Chicago Stadium to take a 2–1 series lead. However, the Oilers won the next three to win the series, and went on to win the Stanley Cup.

May 2	Chicago Blackhawks	2–5	Edmonton Oilers	Northlands Coliseum	Recap
No scoring		First period	09:42 – Mark Messier (6)
No scoring		Second period	03:17 – Mark Lamb (6); 08:52 – Steve Smith (2)
Wayne Presley (8) – 00:57; Steve Larmer (5) – pp – 06:55		Third period	04:43 – Steve Smith (3); 07:39 – Craig MacTavish (2)
Ed Belfour 23 saves / 28 shots		Goalie stats	Bill Ranford 23 saves / 25 shots

May 4	Chicago Blackhawks	4–3	Edmonton Oilers	Northlands Coliseum	Recap
Troy Murray (3) – 17:50		First period	No scoring
Denis Savard (5) – 02:020; Steve Thomas (6) – 17:36		Second period	09:49 – Glenn Anderson (4); 18:01 – pp – Jari Kurri (6)
Doug Wilson (3) – 18:01		Third period	02:10 – Esa Tikkanen (9)
Greg Millen 24 saves / 27 shots		Goalie stats	Bill Ranford 35 saves / 39 shots

May 6	Edmonton Oilers	1–5	Chicago Blackhawks	Chicago Stadium	Recap
Craig Simpson (9) – pp – 06:01		First period	08:41 – Bob Murray (2); 12:32 – Steve Larmer (6)
No scoring		Second period	03:05 – Steve Larmer (7)
No scoring		Third period	07:27 – sh – Dirk Graham (1); 13:51 – Wayne Presley (9)
Bill Ranford 24 saves / 29 shots		Goalie stats	Greg Millen 31 saves / 32 shots

May 8	Edmonton Oilers	4–2	Chicago Blackhawks	Chicago Stadium	Recap
Glenn Anderson (5) – pp – 15:02; Mark Messier (7) – 17:25		First period	18:22 – pp – Denis Savard (6)
Craig Simpson (10) – 00:11; Mark Messier (8) – 14:06		Second period	07:16 – Jeremy Roenick (10)
No scoring		Third period	No scoring
Bill Ranford 25 saves / 27 shots		Goalie stats	Jacques Cloutier 11 saves / 12 shots Greg Millen 1 save / 4 shots

May 10	Chicago Blackhawks	3–4	Edmonton Oilers	Northlands Coliseum	Recap
Steve Konroyd (1) – 14:14		First period	02:08 – Randy Gregg (2); 12:25 – pp – Craig Simpson (11); 14:32 – Adam Graves (2)
Troy Murray (4) – 04:03; Denis Savard (7) – pp – 12:45		Second period	18:29 – pp – Jari Kurri (7)
No scoring		Third period	No scoring
Jacques Cloutier 30 saves / 34 shots		Goalie stats	Bill Ranford 18 saves / 21 shots

May 12	Edmonton Oilers	8–4	Chicago Blackhawks	Chicago Stadium	Recap
Esa Tikkanen (1) – sh – 02:010; Craig Simpson (12) – pp – 12:26; Petr Klima (4) – 15:11		First period	05:01 – pp – Jeremy Roenick (11)
Adam Graves (3) – 05:17; Joe Murphy (4) – 15:22; Glenn Anderson (6) – 17:31; Mark Messier (9) – 17:48		Second period	No scoring
Steve Smith (4) – 03:06		Third period	01:31 – Adam Creighton (3); 08:11 – Steve Thomas (7); 09:04 – pp – Trent Yawney (3)
Bill Ranford 26 saves / 30 shots		Goalie stats	Greg Millen 18 saves / 25 shots Jacques Cloutier 2 saves / 3 shots

Edmonton won series 4–2

Scoring

Player	Pos	GP	G	A	Pts	PIM	+/-	PPG	SHG	GWG
Steve Larmer	RW	20	7	15	22	2	2	2	2	2
Denis Savard	C	20	7	15	22	41	0	4	0	1
Jeremy Roenick	C	20	11	7	18	8	-1	4	0	1
Wayne Presley	RW	19	9	6	15	29	8	1	1	1
Doug Wilson	D	20	3	12	15	18	5	1	0	1
Steve Thomas	LW	20	7	6	13	33	2	1	0	3
Greg Gilbert	LW	19	5	8	13	34	10	0	0	0
Adam Creighton	C	20	3	6	9	59	1	0	1	0
Jocelyn Lemieux	RW	18	1	8	9	28	1	0	0	0
Troy Murray	C	20	4	4	8	22	2	1	0	0
Trent Yawney	D	20	3	5	8	27	-1	3	0	1
Michel Goulet	LW	14	2	4	6	6	2	0	0	0
Dave Manson	D	20	2	4	6	46	-5	1	0	0
Bob Murray	D	16	2	4	6	8	8	0	0	0
Dirk Graham	W	5	1	5	6	2	0	0	1	0
Steve Konroyd	D	20	1	3	4	19	6	0	0	0
Keith Brown	D	18	0	4	4	43	2	0	0	0
Duane Sutter	RW	20	1	1	2	48	-1	0	0	0
Ed Belfour	G	9	0	1	1	6	0	0	0	0
Bob Bassen	C	1	0	0	0	2	-1	0	0	0
Jacques Cloutier	G	4	0	0	0	0	0	0	0	0
Mike Hudson	C/LW	4	0	0	0	2	-2	0	0	0
Bob McGill	D	5	0	0	0	2	1	0	0	0
Greg Millen	G	14	0	0	0	4	0	0	0	0
Cam Russell	D	1	0	0	0	0	-1	0	0	0
Al Secord	LW	12	0	0	0	8	-2	0	0	0
Wayne Van Dorp	LW	8	0	0	0	23	-1	0	0	0

Goaltending

Player	MIN	GP	W	L	GA	GAA	SO	SA	SV	SV%
Greg Millen	613	14	6	6	40	3.92	0	300	260	.867
Ed Belfour	409	9	4	2	17	2.49	0	200	183	.915
Jacques Cloutier	175	4	0	2	8	2.74	0	75	67	.893
Team:	1197	20	10	10	65	3.26	0	575	510	.887

Note: Pos = Position; GP = Games played; G = Goals; A = Assists; Pts = Points; +/- = plus/minus; PIM = Penalty minutes; PPG = Power-play goals; SHG = Short-handed goals; GWG = Game-winning goals
MIN = Minutes played; W = Wins; L = Losses; T = Ties; GA = Goals-against; GAA = Goals-against average; SO = Shutouts; SA = Shots against; SV = Shots saved; SV% = Save percentage;
