= 1989–90 Boston Bruins season =

NHL team season

1989–90 Boston Bruins
- Presidents' Trophy winners
- Wales Conference champions
- Adams Division champions
- Division: 1st Adams
- Conference: 1st Wales
- 1989–90 record: 46–25–9
- Home record: 23–13–4
- Road record: 23–12–5
- Goals for: 289
- Goals against: 232

Team information
- General manager: Harry Sinden
- Coach: Mike Milbury
- Captain: Ray Bourque
- Alternate captains: Craig Janney; Cam Neely
- Arena: Boston Garden

Team leaders
- Goals: Cam Neely (55)
- Assists: Ray Bourque (65)
- Points: Cam Neely (92)
- Penalty minutes: Lyndon Byers (159)
- Wins: Andy Moog (24)
- Goals against average: Rejean Lemelin (2.80)

The 1989–90 Boston Bruins season was the Bruins' 66th season. The season culminated with their participation in the Stanley Cup finals.

== Offseason ==
=== NHL draft ===
Round	Pick	Player	Nationality	College/junior/club team
1	17	Shayne Stevenson (C)	Canada	Kitchener Rangers (OHL)
2	38	Mike Parson (G)	Canada	Guelph Platers (OHL)
3	57	Wes Walz (C)	Canada	Lethbridge Hurricanes (WHL)
4	80	Jackson Penney (RW)	Canada	Victoria Cougars (WHL)
5	101	Mark Montanari (C)	Canada	Kitchener Rangers (OHL)
6	122	Steven Foster (D)	United States	Catholic Memorial School (USHS-MA)
7	143	Oto Hascak (C)	Czechoslovakia	Dukla Trenčín (Czechoslovakia)
8	164	Rick Allain (D)	Canada	Kitchener Rangers (OHL)
9	185	James Lavish (RW)	United States	Deerfield Academy (USHS-MA)
10	206	Geoff Simpson (D)	Canada	Estevan Bruins (SJHL)
11	227	David Franzosa (LW)	United States	Boston College (Hockey East)
S	22	Jeff Schulman (D)	United States	University of Vermont (Hockey East)

== Regular season ==
The Bruins concluded the regular season with the best defensive corps in the league, with just 232 goals allowed. They also allowed the fewest power-play goals (53), the fewest short-handed goals (3) and tied the Washington Capitals for the most shutouts (5). The Bruins managed to secure the Presidents' Trophy with just 101 points, the fewest ever for a Presidents' Trophy winner in a non-lockout-shortened season.

=== Final standings ===
Adams Division
	GP	W	L	T	GF	GA	Pts
**Boston Bruins**	80	46	25	9	289	232	101
**Buffalo Sabres**	80	45	27	8	286	248	98
**Montreal Canadiens**	80	41	28	11	288	234	93
**Hartford Whalers**	80	38	33	9	275	268	85
Quebec Nordiques	80	12	61	7	240	407	31

Note: GP = Games played, W = Wins, L = Losses, T = Ties, Pts = Points, GF = Goals for, GA = Goals against
Note: Teams that qualified for the playoffs are highlighted in bold.

Wales Conference
R		Div	GP	W	L	T	GF	GA	Pts
**1**	**p – Boston Bruins**	**ADM**	**80**	**46**	**25**	**9**	**289**	**232**	**101**
**2**	**Buffalo Sabres**	**ADM**	**80**	**45**	**27**	**8**	**286**	**248**	**98**
**3**	**Montreal Canadiens**	**ADM**	**80**	**41**	**28**	**11**	**288**	**234**	**93**
**4**	**Hartford Whalers**	**ADM**	**80**	**38**	**33**	**9**	**275**	**268**	**85**
**5**	**New York Rangers**	**PTK**	**80**	**36**	**31**	**13**	**279**	**267**	**85**
**6**	**New Jersey Devils**	**PTK**	**80**	**37**	**34**	**9**	**295**	**288**	**83**
**7**	**Washington Capitals**	**PTK**	**80**	**36**	**38**	**6**	**284**	**275**	**78**
**8**	**New York Islanders**	**PTK**	**80**	**31**	**38**	**11**	**281**	**288**	**73**
9	Pittsburgh Penguins	PTK	80	32	40	8	318	359	72
10	Philadelphia Flyers	PTK	80	30	39	11	290	297	71
11	Quebec Nordiques	ADM	80	12	61	7	240	407	31

Divisions: PTK – Patrick, ADM – Adams

bold – Qualified for playoffs; p – Won Presidents' Trophy

=== Record vs. opponents ===
==== Vs. Wales Conference ====
1989–90 NHL records Vs. Adams Division
Team	BOS	BUF	HFD	MTL	QUE	Total
Boston	—	4–3–1	4–3–1	4–3–1	6–1–1	**18–10–4**
Buffalo	3–4–1	—	6–2	4–3–1	7–0–1	**20–9–3**
Hartford	3–4–1	2–6	—	3–4–1	6–1–1	**14–15–3**
Montreal	3–4–1	3–4–1	4–3–1	—	7–1	**17–12–3**
Quebec	1–6–1	0–7–1	1–6–1	1–7	—	**3–26–3**

1989–90 NHL records Vs. Patrick Division
Team	NJD	NYI	NYR	PHI	PIT	WSH	Total
Boston	1–1–1	1–1–1	0–3	3–0	2–1	2–1	**9–7–2**
Buffalo	1–2	0–3	2–0–1	2–1	3–0	1–1–1	**9–7–2**
Hartford	2–1	2–1	1–2	2–1	2–0–1	2–1	**11–6–2**
Montreal	2–1	2–1	3–0	0–2–1	2–1	1–2	**10–7–1**
Quebec	0–3	2–1	0–3	1–1–1	1–2	0–3	**4–13–1**

==== Vs. Campbell Conference ====
1989–90 NHL records Vs. Norris Division
Team	CHI	DET	MIN	STL	TOR	Total
Boston	3–0	3–0	2–1	2–1	2–1	**12–3–0**
Buffalo	1–2	2–1	1–1–1	1–2	2–1	**7–7–1**
Hartford	1–2	2–0–1	2–1	1–2	1–1–1	**7–6–2**
Montreal	1–2	1–0–2	2–1	1–0–2	2–1	**7–4–4**
Quebec	1–2	0–3	1–2	0–3	0–3	**2–13–0**

1989–90 NHL records Vs. Smythe Division
Team	CGY	EDM	LAK	VAN	WIN	Total
Boston	1–1–1	2–0–1	2–1	1–2	1–1–1	**7–5–3**
Buffalo	1–1–1	1–2	2–1	2–0–1	3–0	**9–4–2**
Hartford	0–2–1	1–0–2	2–1	2–1	1–2	**6–6–3**
Montreal	2–1	1–1–1	1–1–1	2–1	1–1–1	**7–5–3**
Quebec	0–1–2	0–3	0–3	2–0–1	1–2	**3–9–3**

== Schedule and results ==
1989–90 regular season
October

Game	Result	Date	Score	Opponent	Record
1	W	October 5, 1989	5–4	Pittsburgh Penguins (1989–90)	1–0–0
2	L	October 7, 1989	1–4	@ Quebec Nordiques (1989–90)	1–1–0
3	W	October 9, 1989	2–0	Montreal Canadiens (1989–90)	2–1–0
4	L	October 11, 1989	2–4	@ Montreal Canadiens (1989–90)	2–2–0
5	T	October 13, 1989	3–3 OT	@ Edmonton Oilers (1989–90)	2–2–1
6	L	October 15, 1989	6–7	@ Vancouver Canucks (1989–90)	2–3–1
7	W	October 17, 1989	3–2	@ Los Angeles Kings (1989–90)	3–3–1
8	W	October 20, 1989	3–0	@ Edmonton Oilers (1989–90)	4–3–1
9	L	October 21, 1989	2–5	@ Calgary Flames (1989–90)	4–4–1
10	W	October 26, 1989	4–2	Quebec Nordiques (1989–90)	5–4–1
11	L	October 28, 1989	0–1	Hartford Whalers (1989–90)	5–5–1
12	L	October 29, 1989	3–4	@ Buffalo Sabres (1989–90)	5–6–1

November

Game	Result	Date	Score	Opponent	Record
13	W	November 2, 1989	5–4 OT	Los Angeles Kings (1989–90)	6–6–1
14	T	November 4, 1989	3–3 OT	Buffalo Sabres (1989–90)	6–6–2
15	W	November 9, 1989	6–2	Edmonton Oilers (1989–90)	7–6–2
16	W	November 10, 1989	5–3	@ Washington Capitals (1989–90)	8–6–2
17	W	November 15, 1989	5–2	@ Hartford Whalers (1989–90)	9–6–2
18	W	November 16, 1989	3–2	Montreal Canadiens (1989–90)	10–6–2
19	W	November 18, 1989	6–4	New Jersey Devils (1989–90)	11–6–2
20	W	November 21, 1989	2–1 OT	@ Detroit Red Wings (1989–90)	12–6–2
21	W	November 23, 1989	6–0	Toronto Maple Leafs (1989–90)	13–6–2
22	L	November 25, 1989	3–5	@ Montreal Canadiens (1989–90)	13–7–2
23	W	November 28, 1989	5–1	@ St. Louis Blues (1989–90)	14–7–2
24	W	November 30, 1989	5–1	Buffalo Sabres (1989–90)	15–7–2

December

Game	Result	Date	Score	Opponent	Record
25	L	December 2, 1989	1–2	St. Louis Blues (1989–90)	15–8–2
26	W	December 3, 1989	2–1	@ Philadelphia Flyers (1989–90)	16–8–2
27	T	December 5, 1989	3–3 OT	@ Quebec Nordiques (1989–90)	16–8–3
28	L	December 7, 1989	3–4	Hartford Whalers (1989–90)	16–9–3
29	L	December 9, 1989	3–7	Washington Capitals (1989–90)	16–10–3
30	L	December 12, 1989	5–7	@ Pittsburgh Penguins (1989–90)	16–11–3
31	W	December 13, 1989	4–2	@ Buffalo Sabres (1989–90)	17–11–3
32	L	December 16, 1989	1–3	Buffalo Sabres (1989–90)	17–12–3
33	L	December 17, 1989	1–3	@ New Jersey Devils (1989–90)	17–13–3
34	L	December 20, 1989	3–4	@ Hartford Whalers (1989–90)	17–14–3
35	W	December 21, 1989	4–2	Minnesota North Stars (1989–90)	18–14–3
36	W	December 23, 1989	6–5	Detroit Red Wings (1989–90)	19–14–3
37	W	December 26, 1989	6–4	Toronto Maple Leafs (1989–90)	20–14–3
38	W	December 29, 1989	4–3 OT	@ Buffalo Sabres (1989–90)	21–14–3
39	L	December 30, 1989	6–7 OT	@ Toronto Maple Leafs (1989–90)	21–15–3

January

Game	Result	Date	Score	Opponent	Record
40	W	January 2, 1990	5–2	@ Pittsburgh Penguins (1989–90)	22–15–3
41	W	January 4, 1990	4–2	Winnipeg Jets (1989–90)	23–15–3
42	W	January 6, 1990	5–3	Washington Capitals (1989–90)	24–15–3
43	W	January 7, 1990	2–1	@ Buffalo Sabres (1989–90)	25–15–3
44	W	January 11, 1990	3–1	Quebec Nordiques (1989–90)	26–15–3
45	L	January 13, 1990	2–3	New York Rangers (1989–90)	26–16–3
46	W	January 15, 1990	4–1	Hartford Whalers (1989–90)	27–16–3
47	T	January 17, 1990	5–5 OT	@ Hartford Whalers (1989–90)	27–16–4
48	T	January 18, 1990	2–2 OT	Calgary Flames (1989–90)	27–16–5
49	W	January 23, 1990	9–2	@ Quebec Nordiques (1989–90)	28–16–5
50	W	January 25, 1990	5–2	New York Islanders (1989–90)	29–16–5
51	W	January 27, 1990	2–1	Philadelphia Flyers (1989–90)	30–16–5
52	W	January 29, 1990	2–1	@ Montreal Canadiens (1989–90)	31–16–5

February

Game	Result	Date	Score	Opponent	Record
53	L	February 1, 1990	2–4	Montreal Canadiens (1989–90)	31–17–5
54	L	February 3, 1990	1–2	New York Rangers (1989–90)	31–18–5
55	W	February 4, 1990	3–2	@ Quebec Nordiques (1989–90)	32–18–5
56	W	February 6, 1990	2–0	@ Detroit Red Wings (1989–90)	33–18–5
57	W	February 8, 1990	5–1	Quebec Nordiques (1989–90)	34–18–5
58	L	February 10, 1990	3–4 OT	New York Islanders (1989–90)	34–19–5
59	L	February 11, 1990	2–4	Vancouver Canucks (1989–90)	34–20–5
60	L	February 14, 1990	2–3	@ Winnipeg Jets (1989–90)	34–21–5
61	W	February 18, 1990	7–2	@ Vancouver Canucks (1989–90)	35–21–5
62	W	February 20, 1990	5–3	@ Calgary Flames (1989–90)	36–21–5
63	W	February 22, 1990	6–3	@ Chicago Blackhawks (1989–90)	37–21–5
64	W	February 24, 1990	3–2	@ Minnesota North Stars (1989–90)	38–21–5
65	L	February 26, 1990	1–6	@ New York Rangers (1989–90)	38–22–5

March

Game	Result	Date	Score	Opponent	Record
66	W	March 1, 1990	5–3	Montreal Canadiens (1989–90)	39–22–5
67	W	March 3, 1990	4–3	Chicago Blackhawks (1989–90)	40–22–5
68	W	March 4, 1990	4–1	@ Chicago Blackhawks (1989–90)	41–22–5
69	W	March 6, 1990	2–1	@ Philadelphia Flyers (1989–90)	42–22–5
70	L	March 8, 1990	4–10	Buffalo Sabres (1989–90)	42–23–5
71	T	March 10, 1990	3–3 OT	@ New York Islanders (1989–90)	42–23–6
72	W	March 11, 1990	4–3	@ Hartford Whalers (1989–90)	43–23–6
73	T	March 15, 1990	3–3 OT	Winnipeg Jets (1989–90)	43–23–7
74	L	March 17, 1990	4–5	Los Angeles Kings (1989–90)	43–24–7
75	W	March 22, 1990	7–3	Quebec Nordiques (1989–90)	44–24–7
76	L	March 24, 1990	6–7	Minnesota North Stars (1989–90)	44–25–7
77	W	March 27, 1990	3–0	@ St. Louis Blues (1989–90)	45–25–7
78	W	March 29, 1990	3–2	Hartford Whalers (1989–90)	46–25–7
79	T	March 31, 1990	2–2 OT	@ Montreal Canadiens (1989–90)	46–25–8

April

Game	Result	Date	Score	Opponent	Record
80	T	April 1, 1990	3–3 OT	New Jersey Devils (1989–90)	46–25–9

Legend: Win (2 points) Loss (0 points) Tie (1 point)

== Player statistics ==
=== Regular season ===
Scoring

Player	Pos	GP	G	A	Pts	PIM	+/-	PPG	SHG	GWG
Cam Neely	RW	76	55	37	92	117	10	25	0	12
Ray Bourque	D	77	19	65	84	50	31	8	0	3
Craig Janney	C	55	24	38	62	4	3	11	0	5
Bobby Carpenter	C	80	25	31	56	97	-3	5	0	5
Bob Sweeney	C/RW	70	22	24	46	93	2	5	2	6
Andy Brickley	LW/C	43	12	28	40	8	11	6	0	1
John Carter	LW	76	17	22	39	26	17	2	1	1
Greg Hawgood	D	77	11	27	38	76	12	2	0	1
Glen Wesley	D	78	9	27	36	48	6	5	0	4
Garry Galley	D	71	8	27	35	75	2	1	0	0
Randy Burridge	LW	63	17	15	32	47	9	7	0	1
Dave Christian	RW	50	12	17	29	8	4	2	0	3
Bobby Gould	RW	77	8	17	25	92	-3	0	0	2
Dave Poulin	C	32	6	19	25	12	11	0	1	0
Ken Linseman	C	32	6	16	22	66	12	1	0	0
Jim Wiemer	D	61	5	14	19	63	11	0	0	1
Rob Cimetta	W	47	8	9	17	33	4	0	0	0
Brian Propp	LW	14	3	9	12	10	2	0	1	0
Peter Douris	RW	36	5	6	11	15	8	1	0	0
Lyndon Byers	RW	43	4	4	8	159	0	0	0	0
Don Sweeney	D	58	3	5	8	58	11	0	0	0
Mike Millar	RW	15	1	4	5	0	-2	0	0	0
Jarmo Kekäläinen	LW	11	2	2	4	8	2	0	0	1
Stephane Quintal	D	38	2	2	4	22	-11	0	0	0
Bob Joyce	LW	23	1	2	3	22	-8	0	0	0
Nevin Markwart	LW	8	1	2	3	15	-2	1	0	0
Allen Pedersen	D	68	1	2	3	71	-5	0	0	0
Andy Moog	G	46	0	3	3	18	0	0	0	0
Greg Johnston	RW	9	1	1	2	6	-1	0	0	0
Wes Walz	C	2	1	1	2	0	-1	1	0	0
Gord Kluzak	D	8	0	2	2	11	4	0	0	0
Michael Thelven	D	6	0	2	2	23	3	0	0	0
Bob Beers	D	3	0	1	1	6	2	0	0	0
Bill O'Dwyer	C	6	0	1	1	2	-2	0	0	0
John Blum	D	2	0	0	0	0	-1	0	0	0
Lou Crawford	LW	7	0	0	0	20	1	0	0	0
Ron Hoover	C	2	0	0	0	0	-2	0	0	0
Brian Lawton	LW	8	0	0	0	14	-4	0	0	0
Rejean Lemelin	G	43	0	0	0	32	0	0	0	0
Ray Neufeld	RW	1	0	0	0	0	0	0	0	0
Bruce Shoebottom	D	2	0	0	0	4	0	0	0	0
Graeme Townshend	RW	4	0	0	0	7	-1	0	0	0

Goaltending

Player	MIN	GP	W	L	T	GA	GAA	SO	SA	SV	SV%
Andy Moog	2536	46	24	10	7	122	2.89	3	1145	1023	.893
Rejean Lemelin	2310	43	22	15	2	108	2.81	2	1002	894	.892
Team:	4846	80	46	25	9	230	2.85	5	2147	1917	.893

=== Playoffs ===
Scoring

Player	Pos	GP	G	A	Pts	PIM	+/-	PPG	SHG	GWG
Cam Neely	RW	21	12	16	28	51	7	4	1	2
Craig Janney	C	18	3	19	22	2	3	1	0	2
Ray Bourque	D	17	5	12	17	16	11	1	0	0
Randy Burridge	LW	21	4	11	15	14	2	0	1	0
Dave Poulin	C	18	8	5	13	8	1	2	0	2
Brian Propp	LW	20	4	9	13	2	5	1	0	2
Bobby Carpenter	C	21	4	6	10	39	-3	2	0	1
John Carter	LW	21	6	3	9	45	0	0	1	0
Glen Wesley	D	21	2	6	8	36	6	0	0	1
Garry Galley	D	21	3	3	6	34	-8	1	0	2
Don Sweeney	D	21	1	5	6	18	-10	1	0	0
Dave Christian	RW	21	4	1	5	4	-6	1	0	0
Greg Hawgood	D	15	1	3	4	12	-9	1	0	0
John Byce	C	8	2	0	2	2	2	0	0	0
Bob Beers	D	14	1	1	2	18	1	0	0	0
Bob Sweeney	C/RW	20	0	2	2	30	-7	0	0	0
Lyndon Byers	RW	17	1	0	1	12	-4	0	0	0
Greg Johnston	RW	5	1	0	1	4	-1	0	0	1
Peter Douris	RW	8	0	1	1	8	0	0	0	0
Jim Wiemer	D	8	0	1	1	4	-4	0	0	0
Andy Brickley	LW/C	2	0	0	0	0	0	0	0	0
Lou Crawford	LW	1	0	0	0	0	-1			
Bobby Gould	RW	17	0	0	0	4	-3	0	0	0
Rejean Lemelin	G	3	0	0	0	0	0	0	0	0
Andy Moog	G	20	0	0	0	6	0	0	0	0
Bill O'Dwyer	C	1	0	0	0	2	0	0	0	0
Allen Pedersen	D	21	0	0	0	41	-1	0	0	0

Goaltending

Player	MIN	GP	W	L	GA	GAA	SO	SA	SV	SV%
Andy Moog	1195	20	13	7	44	2.21	2	486	442	.909
Rejean Lemelin	135	3	0	1	13	5.78	0	57	44	.772
Team:	1330	21	13	8	57	2.57	2	543	486	.895

Note:

Pos = Position;GP = Games played; G = Goals; A = Assists; Pts = Points; PIM = Penalty minutes; +/- = Plus/minus; PPG = Power-play goals; SHG = Short-handed goals; GWG = Game-winning goals
Pos = Position;GP = Games played; Min, TOI = Minutes played; W = Wins; L = Losses; T,T/OT = Ties; OTL = Overtime losses; GA = Goals-against; GAA = Goals-against average; SO = Shutouts; SA = Shots against; SV = Shots saved;SV% = Save percentage;

== Playoffs ==
=== Adams Division Semifinals ===
Boston Bruins vs. Hartford Whalers
Date	Away	Score	Home	Score
Apr. 5	Hartford	4	Boston	3
Apr. 7	Hartford	1	Boston	3
Apr. 9	Boston	3	Hartford	5
Apr. 11	Boston	6	Hartford	5
Apr. 13	Hartford	2	Boston	3
Apr. 15	Boston	2	Hartford	3 (OT)
Apr. 17	Hartford	1	Boston	3
Boston wins best-of-seven series 4–3

=== Adams Division Finals ===
Boston Bruins vs. Montreal Canadiens
Date	Away	Score	Home	Score
Apr. 19	Montreal	0	Boston	1
Apr. 21	Montreal	4	Boston	5 (OT)
Apr. 23	Boston	6	Montreal	3
Apr. 25	Boston	1	Montreal	4
Apr. 27	Montreal	1	Boston	3
Boston wins best-of-seven series 4–1

=== Wales Conference Finals ===
Boston Bruins vs. Washington Capitals
Date	Away	Score	Home	Score
May 3	Washington	3	Boston	5
May 5	Washington	0	Boston	3
May 7	Boston	4	Washington	1
May 9	Boston	3	Washington	2
Boston wins best-of-seven series 4–0

=== Stanley Cup Final ===
In Game 1, Petr Klima scored at 15:13 of the third overtime period to give the Oilers a 3–2 win; this game remains the longest in Stanley Cup Finals history (Longest NHL overtime games), edging both Brett Hull's cup-winner in 1999 and Igor Larionov's game-winner in 2002 by less than 30 seconds. In game five at the Boston Garden on May 24, the Oilers won 4–1. Craig Simpson scored the game-winning goal. Oilers goaltender Bill Ranford was awarded the Conn Smythe Trophy as Playoff MVP.

Boston Bruins vs. Edmonton Oilers

Date	Away	Score	Home	Score	Notes
May 15	Edmonton	3	Boston	2	3OT
May 18	Edmonton	7	Boston	2	
May 20	Boston	2	Edmonton	1	
May 22	Boston	1	Edmonton	5	
May 24	Edmonton	4	Boston	1	
Edmonton wins series 4–1 and Stanley Cup.

== Awards and records ==
- Presidents Trophy
- Prince of Wales Trophy
- James Norris Memorial Trophy: Ray Bourque
- William M. Jennings Trophy: Rejean Lemelin/Andy Moog
