= 1989–90 Toronto Maple Leafs season =

NHL hockey team season

1989–90 Toronto Maple Leafs
- Division: 3rd Norris
- Conference: 6th Campbell
- 1989–90 record: 38–38–4
- Home record: 24–14–2
- Road record: 14–24–2
- Goals for: 337
- Goals against: 358

Team information
- General manager: Floyd Smith
- Coach: Doug Carpenter
- Captain: Rob Ramage
- Alternate captains: Wendel Clark; Brad Marsh
- Arena: Maple Leaf Gardens

Team leaders
- Goals: Gary Leeman (51)
- Assists: Vincent Damphousse (61)
- Points: Gary Leeman (95)
- Penalty minutes: Brian Curran (301)
- Wins: Allan Bester (20)
- Goals against average: Mark Laforest (3.89)

The 1989–90 Toronto Maple Leafs season was Toronto's 73rd season in the National Hockey League (NHL). The Maple Leafs had their first non-losing season since the 1978–79 NHL season, and qualified for the playoffs after missing the prior year. Gary Leeman became the second member of the Maple Leafs to score 50 goals in one season.

== Off-season ==
Newly acquired defenceman Rob Ramage is named team captain. Ramage assumes a role that has been vacant for three seasons.

=== NHL entry draft ===
Round	Pick	Player	Nationality	College/Junior/Club team
1	3	Scott Thornton (C)	Canada	Belleville Bulls (OHL)
1	12	Rob Pearson (RW)	Canada	Belleville Bulls (OHL)
1	21	Steve Bancroft (D)	Canada	Belleville Bulls (OHL)
4	66	Matt Martin (D)	United States	Avon Old Farms (USHS-CT)
5	96	Keith Carney (D)	United States	Mount Saint Charles Academy (USHS-RI)
6	108	Dave Burke (D)	United States	Cornell University (ECAC)
6	125	Mike Doers (RW)	United States	Northwood School (USHS-NY)
7	129	Keith Merkler (LW)	United States	Portledge School (USHS-NY)
8	150	Derek Langille (D)	Canada	North Bay Centennials (OHL)
9	171	Jeffrey St. Laurent (RW)	United States	Berwick Academy (USHS-ME)
10	192	Justin Tomberlin (C)	United States	Greenway High School (USHS-MN)
11	213	Mike Jackson (RW)	Canada	Toronto Marlboros (OHL)
12	234	Steve Chartrand (LW)	Canada	Drummondville Voltigeurs (QMJHL)
S	3	Dave Tomlinson (C)	Canada	Boston University (Hockey East)
S	8	Mike Moes (C)	United States	University of Michigan (CCHA)

== Regular season ==
On the power play, the Maple Leafs scored 81 goals on 348 advantages for a 23.3% success rate. This ranked fourth overall in the NHL. The Maple Leafs allowed 17 shorthanded goals on 348 advantages, which ranked 20th in the league. Against the power play, the Maple Leafs allowed 89 goals on 408 advantages, which ranked 15th in the league. The Maple Leafs scored 16 shorthanded goals, third-best in the league. Dave Reid was influential by scoring four shorthanded goals.

Eddie Olczyk reached 30 goals for the third straight year. Olczyk tied a Maple Leafs scoring record by scoring at least 1 point in 18 consecutive games. It was the NHL's third longest scoring streak of the season. The streak was snapped on January 10 in a game against the New York Islanders. During the streak, Olczyk had 11 goals and 17 assists.

Offensively, the Leafs scored 337 goals and 889 points, the most ever by a Leafs team in a season. They had four 30-goal scorers.

=== Season standings ===
Norris Division
	GP	W	L	T	GF	GA	Pts
**Chicago Blackhawks**	80	41	33	6	315	294	88
**St. Louis Blues**	80	37	34	9	295	279	83
**Toronto Maple Leafs**	80	38	38	4	337	358	80
**Minnesota North Stars**	80	36	40	4	284	291	76
Detroit Red Wings	80	28	38	14	288	323	70

Note: GP = Games played, W = Wins, L = Losses, T = Ties, Pts = Points, GF = Goals for, GA = Goals against
Note: Teams that qualified for the playoffs are highlighted in bold.

Campbell Conference
R		Div	GP	W	L	T	GF	GA	Pts
**1**	**Calgary Flames**	**SMY**	**80**	**42**	**23**	**15**	**348**	**265**	**99**
**2**	**Edmonton Oilers**	**SMY**	**80**	**38**	**28**	**14**	**315**	**283**	**90**
**3**	**Chicago Blackhawks**	**NRS**	**80**	**41**	**33**	**6**	**316**	**294**	**88**
**4**	**Winnipeg Jets**	**SMY**	**80**	**37**	**32**	**11**	**298**	**290**	**85**
**5**	**St. Louis Blues**	**NRS**	**80**	**37**	**34**	**9**	**295**	**279**	**83**
**6**	**Toronto Maple Leafs**	**NRS**	**80**	**38**	**38**	**4**	**337**	**358**	**80**
**7**	**Minnesota North Stars**	**NRS**	**80**	**36**	**40**	**4**	**284**	**291**	**76**
**8**	**Los Angeles Kings**	**SMY**	**80**	**34**	**39**	**7**	**338**	**337**	**75**
9	Detroit Red Wings	NRS	80	28	38	14	288	323	70
10	Vancouver Canucks	SMY	80	25	41	14	245	306	64

Divisions: NRS – Norris, SMY – Smythe

bold – Qualified for playoffs

=== Record vs. opponents ===
==== Vs. Campbell Conference ====
**Vs. Norris Division**

1989–90 NHL records
Team	**CHI**	**DET**	**MIN**	**STL**	**TOR**	**Total**
Chicago	—	4–3–1	3–4–1	2–5–1	5–3	**14–15–3**
Detroit	3–4–1	—	4–4	3–4–1	4–3–1	**14–15–3**
Minnesota	4–3–1	4–4	—	4–4	5–3	**17–14–1**
St. Louis	5–2–1	4–3–1	4–4	—	1–7	**14–16–2**
Toronto	3–5	3–4–1	3–5	7–1	—	**16–15–1**

**Vs. Smythe Division**

1989–90 NHL records
Team	**CGY**	**EDM**	**LAK**	**VAN**	**WIN**	**Total**
Chicago	0–2–1	2–1	2–1	2–1	2–1	**8–6–1**
Detroit	2–1	2–1	1–2	1–1–1	1–1–1	**7–6–2**
Minnesota	1–2	0–3	2–1	1–2	2–1	**6–9–0**
St. Louis	0–2–1	0–2–1	1–2	2–1	1–1–1	**4–8–3**
Toronto	1–2	2–1	2–1	2–1	0–2–1	**7–7–1**

Vs. Wales Conference

**Vs. Adams Division**

1989–90 NHL records
Team	**BOS**	**BUF**	**HFD**	**MTL**	**QUE**	**Total**
Chicago	0–3	2–1	2–1	2–1	2–1	**8–7–0**
Detroit	0–3	1–2	0–2–1	0–1–2	3–0	**4–8–3**
Minnesota	1–2	1–1–1	1–2	1–2	2–1	**6–8–1**
St. Louis	1–2	2–1	2–1	0–1–2	3–0	**8–5–2**
Toronto	1–2	1–2	1–1–1	1–2	3–0	**7–7–1**

**Vs. Patrick Division**

1989–90 NHL records
Team	**NJD**	**NYI**	**NYR**	**PHI**	**PIT**	**WSH**	**Total**
Chicago	1–2	2–1	0–1–2	3–0	3–0	2–1	**11–5–2**
Detroit	1–1–1	1–1–1	0–2–1	1–0–2	0–2–1	0–3	**3–9–6**
Minnesota	2–1	2–1	1–1–1	1–2	1–1–1	0–3	**7–9–2**
St. Louis	1–2	2–1	2–0–1	1–2	3–0	2–0–1	**11–5–2**
Toronto	2–1	0–3	1–1–1	1–2	2–1	2–1	**8–9–1**

== Schedule and results ==
1989–90 regular season
October

Game	Result	Date	Score	Opponent	Record
1	L	October 5, 1989	2–4	@ Los Angeles Kings (1989–90)	0–1–0
2	W	October 7, 1989	8–5	@ St. Louis Blues (1989–90)	1–1–0
3	L	October 11, 1989	1–7	Buffalo Sabres (1989–90)	1–2–0
4	L	October 12, 1989	6–9	@ Chicago Blackhawks (1989–90)	1–3–0
5	L	October 14, 1989	1–5	Winnipeg Jets (1989–90)	1–4–0
6	L	October 17, 1989	5–7	@ Pittsburgh Penguins (1989–90)	1–5–0
7	W	October 18, 1989	4–3	Vancouver Canucks (1989–90)	2–5–0
8	W	October 21, 1989	8–4	Washington Capitals (1989–90)	3–5–0
9	L	October 23, 1989	4–5	New Jersey Devils (1989–90)	3–6–0
10	W	October 25, 1989	8–6	@ Pittsburgh Penguins (1989–90)	4–6–0
11	L	October 27, 1989	5–6 OT	@ Buffalo Sabres (1989–90)	4–7–0
12	W	October 28, 1989	6–4	Detroit Red Wings (1989–90)	5–7–0
13	W	October 31, 1989	6–4	@ Minnesota North Stars (1989–90)	6–7–0

November

Game	Result	Date	Score	Opponent	Record
14	L	November 3, 1989	1–2	@ Washington Capitals (1989–90)	6–8–0
15	L	November 4, 1989	4–7	Philadelphia Flyers (1989–90)	6–9–0
16	W	November 6, 1989	2–1	Minnesota North Stars (1989–90)	7–9–0
17	W	November 9, 1989	4–1	@ Philadelphia Flyers (1989–90)	8–9–0
18	W	November 11, 1989	4–2	Detroit Red Wings (1989–90)	9–9–0
19	L	November 12, 1989	3–6	@ Minnesota North Stars (1989–90)	9–10–0
20	W	November 15, 1989	5–2	St. Louis Blues (1989–90)	10–10–0
21	L	November 16, 1989	2–6	@ New York Islanders (1989–90)	10–11–0
22	L	November 18, 1989	3–4 OT	@ Montreal Canadiens (1989–90)	10–12–0
23	L	November 22, 1989	3–6	@ Minnesota North Stars (1989–90)	10–13–0
24	L	November 23, 1989	0–6	@ Boston Bruins (1989–90)	10–14–0
25	W	November 25, 1989	7–4	New York Rangers (1989–90)	11–14–0
26	W	November 29, 1989	3–2 OT	@ Vancouver Canucks (1989–90)	12–14–0

December

Game	Result	Date	Score	Opponent	Record
27	L	December 2, 1989	4–7	@ Calgary Flames (1989–90)	12–15–0
28	L	December 3, 1989	3–5	@ Edmonton Oilers (1989–90)	12–16–0
29	L	December 6, 1989	4–6	@ Chicago Blackhawks (1989–90)	12–17–0
30	W	December 7, 1989	5–2	@ St. Louis Blues (1989–90)	13–17–0
31	W	December 9, 1989	7–4	Montreal Canadiens (1989–90)	14–17–0
32	W	December 11, 1989	3–1	St. Louis Blues (1989–90)	15–17–0
33	W	December 13, 1989	4–2	@ Detroit Red Wings (1989–90)	16–17–0
34	L	December 16, 1989	3–4	Minnesota North Stars (1989–90)	16–18–0
35	W	December 18, 1989	6–3	St. Louis Blues (1989–90)	17–18–0
36	L	December 20, 1989	2–4	@ Detroit Red Wings (1989–90)	17–19–0
37	W	December 22, 1989	5–3	@ Chicago Blackhawks (1989–90)	18–19–0
38	L	December 23, 1989	5–7	Chicago Blackhawks (1989–90)	18–20–0
39	L	December 26, 1989	4–6	@ Boston Bruins (1989–90)	18–21–0
40	T	December 27, 1989	7–7 OT	Detroit Red Wings (1989–90)	18–21–1
41	W	December 30, 1989	7–6 OT	Boston Bruins (1989–90)	19–21–1

January

Game	Result	Date	Score	Opponent	Record
42	W	January 3, 1990	5–4	Quebec Nordiques (1989–90)	20–21–1
43	W	January 6, 1990	7–4	Los Angeles Kings (1989–90)	21–21–1
44	W	January 8, 1990	8–6	Washington Capitals (1989–90)	22–21–1
45	L	January 10, 1990	1–3	New York Islanders (1989–90)	22–22–1
46	W	January 13, 1990	6–5	Calgary Flames (1989–90)	23–22–1
47	W	January 15, 1990	7–6	Chicago Blackhawks (1989–90)	24–22–1
48	W	January 18, 1990	4–1	@ St. Louis Blues (1989–90)	25–22–1
49	W	January 24, 1990	7–3	Minnesota North Stars (1989–90)	26–22–1
50	W	January 26, 1990	5–1	@ New Jersey Devils (1989–90)	27–22–1
51	L	January 27, 1990	3–5	Montreal Canadiens (1989–90)	27–23–1
52	T	January 31, 1990	5–5 OT	@ Winnipeg Jets (1989–90)	27–23–2

February

Game	Result	Date	Score	Opponent	Record
53	L	February 2, 1990	2–5	@ Detroit Red Wings (1989–90)	27–24–2
54	W	February 3, 1990	8–4	Pittsburgh Penguins (1989–90)	28–24–2
55	L	February 6, 1990	4–6	@ St. Louis Blues (1989–90)	28–25–2
56	W	February 7, 1990	7–1	St. Louis Blues (1989–90)	29–25–2
57	L	February 10, 1990	2–6	@ Hartford Whalers (1989–90)	29–26–2
58	W	February 12, 1990	5–3	Los Angeles Kings (1989–90)	30–26–2
59	T	February 14, 1990	6–6 OT	Hartford Whalers (1989–90)	30–26–3
60	L	February 15, 1990	0–3	@ Philadelphia Flyers (1989–90)	30–27–3
61	W	February 17, 1990	5–4	New Jersey Devils (1989–90)	31–27–3
62	L	February 22, 1990	2–12	@ Calgary Flames (1989–90)	31–28–3
63	W	February 23, 1990	6–5	@ Edmonton Oilers (1989–90)	32–28–3
64	L	February 26, 1990	2–5	@ Vancouver Canucks (1989–90)	32–29–3
65	W	February 28, 1990	5–4	Quebec Nordiques (1989–90)	33–29–3

March

Game	Result	Date	Score	Opponent	Record
66	L	March 2, 1990	2–3 OT	@ Detroit Red Wings (1989–90)	33–30–3
67	L	March 3, 1990	2–5	Detroit Red Wings (1989–90)	33–31–3
68	W	March 8, 1990	7–6	@ Hartford Whalers (1989–90)	34–31–3
69	W	March 10, 1990	3–2	Edmonton Oilers (1989–90)	35–31–3
70	L	March 12, 1990	1–4	Minnesota North Stars (1989–90)	35–32–3
71	L	March 14, 1990	2–8	New York Rangers (1989–90)	35–33–3
72	W	March 16, 1990	4–3	@ Buffalo Sabres (1989–90)	36–33–3
73	L	March 17, 1990	4–5 OT	Winnipeg Jets (1989–90)	36–34–3
74	L	March 19, 1990	2–3	Chicago Blackhawks (1989–90)	36–35–3
75	T	March 21, 1990	5–5 OT	@ New York Rangers (1989–90)	36–35–4
76	W	March 24, 1990	4–3 OT	@ Quebec Nordiques (1989–90)	37–35–4
77	L	March 26, 1990	4–5	@ Minnesota North Stars (1989–90)	37–36–4
78	L	March 28, 1990	3–6	New York Islanders (1989–90)	37–37–4
79	L	March 29, 1990	2–4	@ Chicago Blackhawks (1989–90)	37–38–4
80	W	March 31, 1990	6–4	Chicago Blackhawks (1989–90)	38–38–4

Legend: Win (2 points) Loss (0 points) Tie (1 point)

== Player statistics ==
=== Regular season ===
Scoring

Player	Pos	GP	G	A	Pts	PIM	+/-	PPG	SHG	GWG
Gary Leeman	RW	80	51	44	95	63	4	14	1	5
Vincent Damphousse	C	80	33	61	94	56	2	9	0	5
Eddie Olczyk	C	79	32	56	88	78	0	6	0	4
Daniel Marois	RW	68	39	37	76	82	1	14	0	3
Mark Osborne	LW	78	23	50	73	91	2	3	1	6
Al Iafrate	D	75	21	42	63	135	-4	6	1	0
Tom Kurvers	D	70	15	37	52	29	-8	9	1	1
Rob Ramage	D	80	8	41	49	202	-1	3	0	1
Tom Fergus	C	54	19	26	45	62	-18	4	0	2
Lou Franceschetti	RW	80	21	15	36	127	-12	0	2	4
Dave Reid	LW	70	9	19	28	9	-8	0	4	1
Wendel Clark	LW/D	38	18	8	26	116	2	7	0	2
Dan Daoust	C	65	7	11	18	89	1	0	4	0
Gilles Thibaudeau	C	21	7	11	18	13	6	3	0	2
Luke Richardson	D	67	4	14	18	122	-1	0	0	0
John McIntyre	C	59	5	12	17	117	-12	0	1	1
Dave Hannan	C	39	6	9	15	55	-12	0	1	0
Scott Pearson	LW	41	5	10	15	90	-7	0	0	1
Todd Gill	D	48	1	14	15	92	-8	0	0	0
Brad Marsh	D	79	1	13	14	95	14	0	0	0
John Kordic	RW	55	9	4	13	252	-8	3	0	0
Brian Curran	D	72	2	9	11	301	-2	0	0	0
Bobby Reynolds	LW	7	1	1	2	0	-3	0	0	0
Allan Bester	G	42	0	2	2	4	0	0	0	0
Peter Ihnacak	C	5	0	2	2	0	3	0	0	0
Mark LaForest	G	27	0	1	1	23	0	0	0	0
Paul Lawless	LW	6	0	1	1	0	-4	0	0	0
Jeff Reese	G	21	0	1	1	10	0	0	0	0
Darryl Shannon	D	10	0	1	1	12	-10	0	0	0
Jack Capuano	D	1	0	0	0	0	-1	0	0	0
Tie Domi	RW	2	0	0	0	42	0	0	0	0
Rocky Dundas	RW	5	0	0	0	14	-1	0	0	0
Peter Ing	G	3	0	0	0	0	0	0	0	0
Sean McKenna	RW	5	0	0	0	20	-3	0	0	0
Mike Stevens	LW	1	0	0	0	0	0	0	0	0

Goaltending

Player	MIN	GP	W	L	T	GA	GAA	SO	SA	SV	SV%
Allan Bester	2206	42	20	16	0	165	4.49	0	1296	1131	.873
Mark LaForest	1343	27	9	14	0	87	3.89	0	765	678	.886
Jeff Reese	1101	21	9	6	3	81	4.41	0	630	549	.871
Peter Ing	182	3	0	2	1	18	5.93	0	107	89	.832
Team:	4832	80	38	38	4	351	4.36	0	2798	2447	.875

=== Playoffs ===
Scoring

Player	Pos	GP	G	A	Pts	PIM	PPG	SHG	GWG
Gary Leeman	RW	5	3	3	6	16	2	0	0
Mark Osborne	LW	5	2	3	5	12	0	1	0
Daniel Marois	RW	5	2	2	4	12	2	0	0
Tom Fergus	C	5	2	1	3	4	0	0	0
Eddie Olczyk	C	5	1	2	3	14	0	0	0
Rob Ramage	D	5	1	2	3	20	0	0	0
Todd Gill	D	5	0	3	3	16	0	0	0
Tom Kurvers	D	5	0	3	3	4	0	0	0
Scott Pearson	LW	2	2	0	2	10	0	0	0
Wendel Clark	LW/D	5	1	1	2	19	0	0	0
Vincent Damphousse	C	5	0	2	2	2	0	0	0
Dave Hannan	C	3	1	0	1	4	0	0	1
Brad Marsh	D	5	1	0	1	2	0	0	0
Brian Curran	D	5	0	1	1	19	0	0	0
Dan Daoust	C	5	0	1	1	20	0	0	0
Lou Franceschetti	RW	5	0	1	1	26	0	0	0
John Kordic	RW	5	0	1	1	33	0	0	0
Allan Bester	G	4	0	0	0	0	0	0	0
John McIntyre	C	2	0	0	0	2	0	0	0
Jeff Reese	G	2	0	0	0	0	0	0	0
Dave Reid	LW	3	0	0	0	0	0	0	0
Luke Richardson	D	5	0	0	0	22	0	0	0

Goaltending

Player	MIN	GP	W	L	GA	GAA	SO	SA	SV	SV%
Jeff Reese	108	2	1	1	6	3.33	0	50	44	.880
Allan Bester	196	4	0	3	14	4.29	0	120	106	.883
Team:	304	5	1	4	20	3.95	0	170	150	.882

Note:

Pos = Position;GP = Games played; G = Goals; A = Assists; Pts = Points; PIM = Penalty minutes; +/- = Plus/minus; PPG = Power-play goals; SHG = Short-handed goals; GWG = Game-winning goals
Pos = Position;GP = Games played; Min, TOI = Minutes played; W = Wins; L = Losses; T,T/OT = Ties; OTL = Overtime losses; GA = Goals-against; GAA = Goals-against average; SO = Shutouts; SA = Shots against; SV = Shots saved;SV% = Save percentage;

== Playoffs ==
St. Louis vs. Toronto
Date	Away	Home
April 4	Toronto 2	4 St. Louis
April 6	Toronto 2	4 St. Louis
April 8	St. Louis 6	5 Toronto	OT
April 10	St. Louis 2	4 Toronto
April 12	Toronto 3	4 St. Louis
St. Louis wins series 4–1

== Awards and records ==
- Fewest Ties in One Season, 4 ties
- Most Goals Scored in One Season, 337 goals
- Most Penalty Minutes in One Season, 2,419 penalty minutes
- Gary Leeman, Molson Cup (Most game star selections for Toronto Maple Leafs)
- Al Iafrate, Defence, NHL All-Star Game
Player is still active or individual record

Regular Season
Player	Milestone	Reached
Eddie Olczyk	400th NHL Game	October 28, 1989

== Transactions ==
The Maple Leafs have been involved in the following transactions during the 1989–90 season.

=== Trades ===
June 29, 1989	To Washington Capitals 5th round pick in 1990 – Mark Ouimet	To Toronto Maple Leafs Lou Franceschetti
August 28, 1989	To Philadelphia Flyers Jiri Latal	To Toronto Maple Leafs 7th round pick in 1990 – Andrei Lomakin
September 8, 1989	To Philadelphia Flyers 5th round pick in 1991 – Juha Ylonen; 7th round pick in 1991 – Andrei Lomakin	To Toronto Maple Leafs Mark Laforest
October 16, 1989	To New Jersey Devils 1st round pick in 1991 – Scott Niedermayer	To Toronto Maple Leafs Tom Kurvers
December 20, 1989	To New York Islanders Jack Capuano; Paul Gagne; Derek Laxdal	To Toronto Maple Leafs Gilles Thibaudeau; Mike Stevens
December 21, 1989	To Edmonton Oilers Vladimir Ruzicka	To Toronto Maple Leafs 4th round pick in 1990 – Greg Walters
June 16, 1990	To Philadelphia Flyers 3rd round pick in 1990 – Al Kinisky	To Toronto Maple Leafs Kevin Maguire; 8th round pick in 1991 – Dmitri Mironov
June 28, 1990	To New York Rangers Tie Domi; Mark Laforest	To Toronto Maple Leafs Greg Johnston

=== Free agents ===
Player	Former team
Rocky Dundas	Montreal Canadiens

Player	New team
Borje Salming	Detroit Red Wings
Chris Kotsopoulos	Detroit Red Wings
