= Martin Madden (ice hockey) =

Canadian ice hockey general manager

- Born: Martin Madden; June 5, 1943 (age 81); Quebec City, Quebec, Canada
- Occupation: Former general manager of the Quebec Nordiques

Martin Madden Sr. (born June 5, 1943) is a Canadian former ice hockey general manager. He served as general manager for the Quebec Nordiques from June 27, 1988, to February 2, 1990. Madden also spent time volunteer coaching the Quebec Beavers youth ice hockey team at the Quebec International Pee-Wee Hockey Tournament.
