= Greg Adams (ice hockey, born 1960) =

Canadian ice hockey player (born 1960)

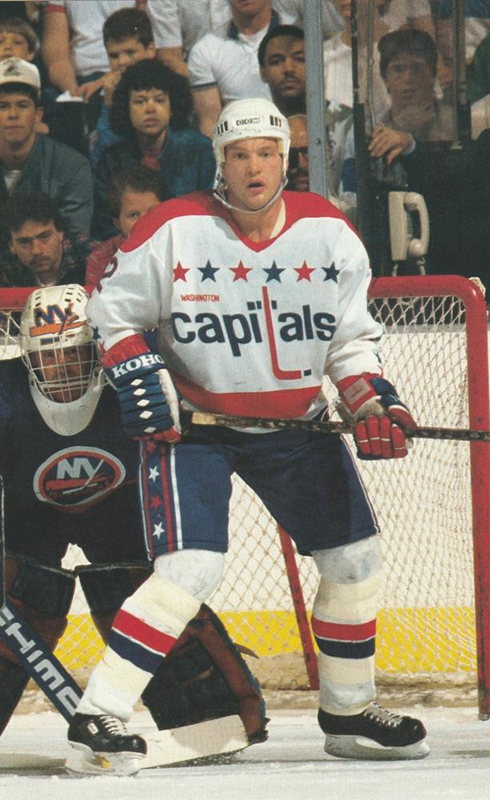
- Adams in 1987
- Born: May 31, 1960 (age 66) Duncan, British Columbia, Canada
- Height: 6 ft 1 in (185 cm)
- Weight: 190 lb (86 kg; 13 st 8 lb)
- Position: Left wing
- Shot: Left
- Played for: Philadelphia Flyers; Hartford Whalers; Washington Capitals; Edmonton Oilers; Vancouver Canucks; Quebec Nordiques; Detroit Red Wings
- NHL draft: Undrafted
- Playing career: 1980–1990

Gregory Charles Adams (born May 31, 1960) is a Canadian former professional ice hockey forward who played in the National Hockey League (NHL) from 1980–81 to 1989–90.

== Playing career ==
Adams was passed over in the 1979 NHL entry draft and signed as a free agent with the Philadelphia Flyers in 1979. In his final year in the Western Hockey League (WHL) with the Victoria Cougars he scored 62 goals playing on a line with Barry Pederson. He spent the 1980–81 season with the Flyers' farm team, the Maine Mariners, and impressed in a six-game stint in Philadelphia, scoring three goals. The following season he appeared in 33 games, scoring 19 points.

Adams was traded to the Hartford Whalers in the Mark Howe trade in the summer of 1982. In the 1982–83 season, he spent his first full season in the NHL, scoring 10 goals and 23 points in 79 games. He established himself as a gritty, physical presence and registered 216 penalty minutes (PIM), the highest total of his career.

Adams was dealt again in the summer of 1983, this time to the Washington Capitals. While the Whalers had just 19 wins in 1982–83, the Capitals were one of the deepest squads in the league, and he found it more difficult to get ice time. In his first two years in Washington, he scored just eight goals in 108 games and was demoted briefly to the American Hockey League (AHL). However, he established himself as a key member of the team in the 1985–86 season, and put up surprising numbers with 18 goals and 56 points, along with 152 PIM. He continued to perform well over the next two seasons, posting totals of 14 and 15 goals while providing his usual physical presence.

For the 1988–89 season, Adams has moved to the defending Stanley Cup champions Edmonton Oilers. However, he struggled to find a niche with the Oilers, scoring just four goals in 49 games, and was dealt again at the trade deadline, this time to the Vancouver Canucks. This created one of the more unusual situations in NHL history, as the Canucks' lineup already featured star winger Greg "Gus" Adams.

Adams's stint in Vancouver was brief, scoring four goals in 12 games for the team. He was claimed in the 1989 NHL Waiver Draft by the Quebec Nordiques just before the 1989–90 season, but spent most of the season in the AHL. He finished the season with the Detroit Red Wings before retiring.

Adams finished his career with 84 goals and 227 career points in 545 NHL games and recorded 1,173 PIM.

== Post-playing career ==
After Adams retired from the NHL, he moved back to Duncan, British Columbia, close to where he grew up. He is now an owner of some Tim Hortons franchises around Duncan.

== Career statistics ==
			Regular season					Playoffs
Season	Team	League	GP	G	A	Pts	PIM	GP	G	A	Pts	PIM
1977–78	Nanaimo Clippers	BCJHL	62	53	61	114	150	—	—	—	—	—
1978–79	Victoria Cougars	WHL	71	23	31	54	151	14	5	0	5	59
1979–80	Victoria Cougars	WHL	71	62	48	110	212	16	9	11	20	71
1980–81	Maine Mariners	AHL	71	19	20	39	158	20	2	3	5	89
1980–81	Philadelphia Flyers	NHL	6	3	0	3	8	—	—	—	—	—
1981–82	Maine Mariners	AHL	45	16	21	37	241	4	0	3	3	28
1981–82	Philadelphia Flyers	NHL	33	4	15	19	105	—	—	—	—	—
1982–83	Hartford Whalers	NHL	79	10	13	23	216	—	—	—	—	—
1983–84	Washington Capitals	NHL	57	2	6	8	133	1	0	0	0	0
1984–85	Binghamton Whalers	AHL	28	9	16	25	58	—	—	—	—	—
1984–85	Washington Capitals	NHL	51	6	12	18	72	5	0	0	0	9
1985–86	Washington Capitals	NHL	78	18	38	56	152	9	1	3	4	27
1986–87	Washington Capitals	NHL	67	14	30	44	184	7	1	3	4	38
1987–88	Washington Capitals	NHL	78	15	12	27	153	14	0	5	5	58
1988–89	Edmonton Oilers	NHL	49	4	5	9	82	—	—	—	—	—
1988–89	Vancouver Canucks	NHL	12	4	2	6	35	7	0	0	0	21
1989–90	Halifax Citadels	AHL	10	6	13	19	18	—	—	—	—	—
1989–90	Quebec Nordiques	NHL	7	1	3	4	17	—	—	—	—	—
1989–90	Detroit Red Wings	NHL	28	3	7	10	16	—	—	—	—	—
NHL totals			545	84	143	227	1,173	43	2	11	13	153

== Awards and honours ==
Award	Year
WHL
First All-Star Team	1980
