= Tony Horacek =

- Born: February 3, 1967 (age 59) Vancouver, British Columbia, Canada
- Height: 6 ft 4 in (193 cm)
- Weight: 215 lb (98 kg; 15 st 5 lb)
- Position: Left wing
- Shot: Left
- Played for: Philadelphia Flyers; Chicago Blackhawks
- NHL draft: 147th overall, 1985; Philadelphia Flyers
- Playing career: 1988–1998

Anthony S. Horacek (born February 3, 1967) is a Canadian former professional ice hockey left winger who played in the National Hockey League (NHL) with the Philadelphia Flyers and Chicago Blackhawks.

== Playing career ==
Horacek had his best game as a professional on December 30, 1989. In a game at the Great Western Forum against the Los Angeles Kings, his hat trick helped the Flyers to a 6–3 win.

== Coaching career ==
He recently accepted a head coaching position at Lebanon Valley College in Annville, Pennsylvania. He currently coaches the Midget 16U AAA Palmyra Black Knights

== Career statistics ==
			Regular season					Playoffs
Season	Team	League	GP	G	A	Pts	PIM	GP	G	A	Pts	PIM
1984–85	Kelowna Wings	WHL	67	9	18	27	114	6	0	1	1	11
1985–86	Spokane Chiefs	WHL	64	19	28	47	129	9	4	5	9	29
1986–87	Spokane Chiefs	WHL	64	23	37	60	177	5	1	3	4	18
1986–87	Hershey Bears	AHL	—	—	—	—	—	1	0	0	0	0
1987–88	Spokane Chiefs	WHL	24	17	23	40	63	—	—	—	—	—
1987–88	Kamloops Blazers	WHL	26	14	17	31	51	18	6	4	10	73
1987–88	Hershey Bears	AHL	1	0	0	0	0	—	—	—	—	—
1988–89	Hershey Bears	AHL	10	0	0	0	38	—	—	—	—	—
1988–89	Indianapolis Ice	IHL	43	11	13	24	138	—	—	—	—	—
1989–90	Philadelphia Flyers	NHL	48	5	5	10	117	—	—	—	—	—
1989–90	Hershey Bears	AHL	12	0	5	5	25	—	—	—	—	—
1990–91	Philadelphia Flyers	NHL	34	3	6	9	49	—	—	—	—	—
1990–91	Hershey Bears	AHL	19	5	3	8	35	4	2	0	2	14
1991–92	Philadelphia Flyers	NHL	34	1	3	4	51	—	—	—	—	—
1991–92	Chicago Blackhawks	NHL	12	1	4	5	21	2	1	0	1	2
1992–93	Indianapolis Ice	IHL	6	1	1	2	28	5	3	2	5	18
1993–94	Chicago Blackhawks	NHL	7	0	0	0	53	—	—	—	—	—
1993–94	Indianapolis Ice	IHL	29	6	7	13	63	—	—	—	—	—
1994–95	Chicago Blackhawks	NHL	19	0	1	1	25	—	—	—	—	—
1994–95	Indianapolis Ice	IHL	51	7	19	26	201	—	—	—	—	—
1995–96	Hershey Bears	AHL	34	4	9	13	75	5	1	1	2	4
1996–97	Cincinnati Cyclones	IHL	60	4	5	9	158	2	0	1	1	2
1997–98	Utah Grizzlies	IHL	5	0	0	0	7	—	—	—	—	—
NHL totals			154	10	19	29	316	2	1	0	1	2
