= Shaun Sabol =

American ice hockey player (born 1966)

- Born: July 13, 1966 (age 60) Minneapolis, Minnesota, U.S.
- Height: 6 ft 3 in (191 cm)
- Weight: 215 lb (98 kg; 15 st 5 lb)
- Position: Defense
- Shot: Left
- Played for: Philadelphia Flyers
- NHL draft: 209th overall, 1986; Philadelphia Flyers
- Playing career: 1987–1992

Shaun Thomas Sabol (born July 13, 1966) is an American former professional ice hockey defenseman who played in the National Hockey League (NHL) with the Philadelphia Flyers during the 1989–90 season.

== Career statistics ==
			Regular season					Playoffs
Season	Team	League	GP	G	A	Pts	PIM	GP	G	A	Pts	PIM
1983–84	St. Paul Vulcans	USHL	47	6	10	16	32	—	—	—	—	—
1984–85	St. Paul Vulcans	USHL	47	4	13	17	137	—	—	—	—	—
1985–86	St. Paul Vulcans	USHL	46	10	19	29	129	—	—	—	—	—
1986–87	University of Wisconsin	NCAA	40	7	16	23	98	—	—	—	—	—
1987–88	University of Wisconsin	NCAA	8	4	3	7	10	—	—	—	—	—
1987–88	Hershey Bears	AHL	51	1	9	10	66	2	0	0	0	5
1988–89	Hershey Bears	AHL	58	7	11	18	134	12	0	2	2	35
1989–90	Philadelphia Flyers	NHL	2	0	0	0	0	—	—	—	—	—
1989–90	Hershey Bears	AHL	46	6	16	22	49	—	—	—	—	—
1990–91	Hershey Bears	AHL	59	6	13	19	136	7	0	1	1	34
1991–92	Binghamton Rangers	AHL	72	5	19	24	123	11	1	2	3	10
NHL totals			2	0	0	0	0	—	—	—	—	—
AHL totals			286	25	68	93	508	32	1	5	6	84
