= Dan Vincelette =

Canadian ice hockey player

- Born: August 1, 1967 (age 57); Verdun, Quebec, Canada
- Height: 6 ft 2 in (188 cm)
- Weight: 200 lb (91 kg; 14 st 4 lb)
- Position: Left wing
- Shot: Left
- Played for: Chicago Blackhawks; Quebec Nordiques; Durham Wasps
- NHL draft: 74th overall, 1985; Chicago Black Hawks
- Playing career: 1987–1997

Daniel Vincelette (born August 1, 1967) is a Canadian former professional ice hockey player who played in the National Hockey League (NHL) for the Chicago Blackhawks and Quebec Nordiques from 1987 to 1992. The rest of his career, which lasted from 1987 to 1997, was mainly spent in the minor leagues.

== Biography ==
Vincelette was born in Verdun, Quebec. As a youth, he played in the 1979 Quebec International Pee-Wee Hockey Tournament with a minor ice hockey team from Acton Vale, Quebec.

Vincelette started his National Hockey League career with the Chicago Blackhawks in 1986. He also played for the Quebec Nordiques. He left the NHL after the 1992 season.

== Career statistics ==
=== Regular season and playoffs ===
			Regular season					Playoffs
Season	Team	League	GP	G	A	Pts	PIM	GP	G	A	Pts	PIM
1982–83	Cantons de l'Est Cantonniers	QMAAA	1	0	0	0	0	—	—	—	—	—
1983–84	Cantons de l'Est Cantonniers	QMAAA	40	9	13	22	43	15	4	4	8	32
1984–85	Drummondville Voltigeurs	QMJHL	64	11	24	35	124	12	0	1	1	11
1985–86	Drummondville Voltigeurs	QMJHL	69	38	45	83	244	22	11	14	25	35
1986–87	Drummondville Voltigeurs	QMJHL	50	34	35	69	288	8	6	5	11	17
1986–87	Chicago Blackhawks	NHL	—	—	—	—	—	3	0	0	0	0
1987–88	Chicago Blackhawks	NHL	69	6	11	17	109	4	0	0	0	0
1988–89	Chicago Blackhawks	NHL	66	11	4	15	119	5	0	0	0	4
1988–89	Saginaw Spirit	IHL	2	0	0	0	14	—	—	—	—	—
1989–90	Chicago Blackhawks	NHL	2	0	0	0	4	—	—	—	—	—
1989–90	Indianapolis Ice	IHL	49	16	13	29	262	—	—	—	—	—
1989–90	Quebec Nordiques	NHL	11	0	1	1	25	—	—	—	—	—
1989–90	Halifax Citadels	AHL	—	—	—	—	—	2	0	0	0	4
1990–91	Indianapolis Ice	IHL	15	5	3	8	51	7	2	1	3	62
1990–91	Quebec Nordiques	NHL	16	0	1	1	38	—	—	—	—	—
1990–91	Halifax Citadels	AHL	24	4	9	13	85	—	—	—	—	—
1991–92	Chicago Blackhawks	NHL	29	3	5	8	56	—	—	—	—	—
1991–92	Indianapoli Ice	IHL	16	5	3	8	84	—	—	—	—	—
1992–93	Atlanta Knights	IHL	30	5	5	10	126	—	—	—	—	—
1992–93	San Diego Gulls	IHL	6	0	0	0	6	—	—	—	—	—
1993–94	Durham Wasps	BHL	10	3	2	5	36	6	0	0	0	52
1995–96	San Francisco Spiders	IHL	35	3	7	10	96	4	0	0	0	15
1996–97	Acton Vale Nova	QSPHL	22	10	12	22	155	—	—	—	—	—
NHL totals			193	20	22	42	351	12	0	0	0	4
