= 1989 NHL supplemental draft =

Player selection draft

General information
- Date: June 16, 1989

Overview
- 26 total selections in 2 rounds
- First selection: (United States) Dave DePinto (Quebec Nordiques)

The 1989 NHL supplemental draft was the fourth NHL supplemental draft. It was held on June 16, 1989.

== Selections by round ==
=== Round one ===
The first round was limited to teams that missed the 1989 Stanley Cup playoffs.

Pick #	Player	Nationality	NHL team	College (league)
1	Dave DePinto (G)	United States	Quebec Nordiques	University of Illinois at Chicago (CCHA)
2	Rob Vanderydt (C)	Canada	New York Islanders	Miami University (CCHA)
3	Dave Tomlinson (C)	Canada	Toronto Maple Leafs	Boston University (Hockey East)
4	Peter Hankinson (F)	United States	Winnipeg Jets	University of Minnesota (WCHA)
5	C. J. Young (RW)	United States	New Jersey Devils	Harvard University (ECAC)

=== Round two ===
Pick #	Player	Nationality	NHL team	College (league)
6	Rick Berens (F)	United States	Quebec Nordiques	University of Denver (WCAC)
7	Brad Mattson (F)	United States	New York Islanders	Saint Mary's University of Minnesota (MIAC)
8	Mike Moes (C)	Canada	Toronto Maple Leafs	University of Michigan (CCHA)
9	Jon Anderson (LW)	United States	Winnipeg Jets	University of Minnesota (WCHA)
10	Mark Romaine (G)	United States	New Jersey Devils	Providence College (Hockey East)
11	Alex Roberts (D)	United States	Chicago Blackhawks	University of Michigan (CCHA)
12	Jamie Loewen (G)	Canada	Minnesota North Stars	University of Alaska Fairbanks (NCAA)
13	Jeff Napierala (RW)	United States	Vancouver Canucks	Lake Superior State University (CCHA)
14	Rob Tustian (D)	United States	St. Louis Blues	Michigan Technological University (WCHA)
15	Chris Tancill (RW)	United States	Hartford Whalers	University of Wisconsin (WCHA)
16	Brad Kreick (D)	Canada	Detroit Red Wings	Brown University (ECAC)
17	Jamie Baker (D)	United States	Philadelphia Flyers	University of Windsor (OUAA)
18	Anthony Palumbo (C)	Canada	New York Rangers	Lake Superior State University (CCHA)
19	Ian Boyce (LW)	Canada	Buffalo Sabres	University of Vermont (ECAC)
20	Dave Aiken (F)	United States	Edmonton Oilers	University of New Hampshire (Hockey East)
21	John DePourcq (C)	Canada	Pittsburgh Penguins	Ferris State University (CCHA)
22	Jeff Schulman (D)	United States	Boston Bruins	University of Vermont (ECAC)
23	Carl Repp (G)	Canada	Los Angeles Kings	University of British Columbia (CWUAA)
24	Karl Clauss (D)	United States	Washington Capitals	Colgate University (ECAC)
25	Craig Charron (C)	United States	Montreal Canadiens	University of Massachusetts Lowell (Hockey East)
26	Shawn Heaphy (C)	Canada	Calgary Flames	Michigan State University (CCHA)

== See also ==
- 1989 NHL entry draft
- 1989–90 NHL season
- List of NHL players
