= 1989–90 Hartford Whalers season =

National Hockey League team season

1989–90 Hartford Whalers
- Division: 4th Adams
- Conference: 5th Wales
- 1989–90 record: 38–33–9
- Home record: 17–18–5
- Road record: 21–15–4
- Goals for: 275
- Goals against: 268

Team information
- General manager: Eddie Johnston
- Coach: Rick Ley
- Captain: Ron Francis
- Alternate captains: Dave Tippett; Joel Quenneville
- Arena: Hartford Civic Center
- Average attendance: 13,705 (87.7%)
- Minor league affiliate: Binghamton Whalers (AHL)

Team leaders
- Goals: Pat Verbeek (44)
- Assists: Ron Francis (69)
- Points: Ron Francis (101)
- Penalty minutes: Pat Verbeek (228)
- Plus/minus: Ulf Samuelsson (+15)
- Wins: Peter Sidorkiewicz (19)
- Goals against average: Mike Liut (2.64)

The 1989–90 Hartford Whalers season was the Whalers' eleventh season in the National Hockey League (NHL).

== Offseason ==
On May 12, 1989, the Whalers announced that general manager Emile Francis would be promoted to team president. Replacing Francis as general manager of the club was Eddie Johnston. Johnston had previously held the general manager position with the Pittsburgh Penguins from 1983 to 1988. During his tenure with the Penguins, the club drafted Mario Lemieux with the first overall selection in the 1984 NHL entry draft.

Four days later, on May 16, Johnston fired head coach Larry Pleau. Pleau led the Whalers to an 81-117-26 record over parts of five seasons as head coach of the club from 1980 to 1988. Pleau also had previously been the general manager of the club from 1981 to 1983. Just over two weeks later, Hartford hired Rick Ley to take over as head coach of the team. Ley had played with the Whalers when they played in the World Hockey Association from 1972 to 1979, then in the National Hockey League from 1979 to 1981. Ley would have his number retired by the club on December 26, 1982. In 1981-82, Ley worked as an assistant coach with the Whalers. Midway in the 1982-83, Ley took over head coaching duties with the Binghamton Whalers, leading them to a 22-17-5 record in 44 games. From 1984 to 1988, Ley was the head coach of the Muskegon Lumberjacks of the IHL, leading the club to three 50+ win seasons in four years, while winning the Turner Cup during the 1985-86 season. In 1988-89, Ley coached the Milwaukee Admirals, leading the team to a 54-23-5 record in his only season with the club.

At the 1989 NHL entry draft, held at the Met Center in Bloomington, Minnesota on June 17, the Whalers selected Bobby Holik from Dukla Jihlava of the Czechoslovak Extraliga. In 36 games during the 1988-89 season, Holik scored 10 goals and 25 points in 35 games. Other notable selections that Hartford made include Blair Atcheynum, Jim McKenzie, James Black, Scott Daniels and Michel Picard.

At the draft, the Whalers made a trade with the New Jersey Devils. Hartford acquired Pat Verbeek from the Devils in exchange for Sylvain Turgeon. In 1988-89, Verbeek scored 26 goals and 47 points in 77 games. His best season with New Jersey was in 1987-88, as Verbeek scored 46 goals and 77 points in 73 games, helping the club reach the post-season for the first time since the team relocated to New Jersey. In 463 career games, Verbeek scored 170 goals and 320 points since joining the Devils in 1982.

At the 1989 NHL supplemental draft, the Whalers selected Chris Tancill. In 44 games during the 1988–89 season with the Wisconsin Badgers, Tancill scored 20 goals and 43 points.

On July 1, Brent Peterson announced his retirement from hockey. Nineteen days later, the Whalers hired Peterson as an assistant coach.

The Whalers acquired Mikael Andersson from the Minnesota North Stars at the Waiver Draft held on October 2. Andersson played in 14 games with the Buffalo Sabres during the 1988-89 season, earning an assist. In 56 games with the Rochester Americans of the American Hockey League, Andersson scored 18 goals and 51 points.

== Regular season ==
=== Final standings ===
Adams Division
	GP	W	L	T	GF	GA	Pts
**Boston Bruins**	80	46	25	9	289	232	101
**Buffalo Sabres**	80	45	27	8	286	248	98
**Montreal Canadiens**	80	41	28	11	288	234	93
**Hartford Whalers**	80	38	33	9	275	268	85
Quebec Nordiques	80	12	61	7	240	407	31
Source:Note: GP = Games played, W = Wins, L = Losses, T = Ties, Pts = Points, GF = Goals for, GA = Goals against Note: Teams that qualified for the playoffs are highlighted in bold.

Wales Conference
R		Div	GP	W	L	T	GF	GA	Pts
**1**	**p – Boston Bruins**	**ADM**	**80**	**46**	**25**	**9**	**289**	**232**	**101**
**2**	**Buffalo Sabres**	**ADM**	**80**	**45**	**27**	**8**	**286**	**248**	**98**
**3**	**Montreal Canadiens**	**ADM**	**80**	**41**	**28**	**11**	**288**	**234**	**93**
**4**	**Hartford Whalers**	**ADM**	**80**	**38**	**33**	**9**	**275**	**268**	**85**
**5**	**New York Rangers**	**PTK**	**80**	**36**	**31**	**13**	**279**	**267**	**85**
**6**	**New Jersey Devils**	**PTK**	**80**	**37**	**34**	**9**	**295**	**288**	**83**
**7**	**Washington Capitals**	**PTK**	**80**	**36**	**38**	**6**	**284**	**275**	**78**
**8**	**New York Islanders**	**PTK**	**80**	**31**	**38**	**11**	**281**	**288**	**73**
9	Pittsburgh Penguins	PTK	80	32	40	8	318	359	72
10	Philadelphia Flyers	PTK	80	30	39	11	290	297	71
11	Quebec Nordiques	ADM	80	12	61	7	240	407	31

Divisions: PTK – Patrick, ADM – Adams

bold – Qualified for playoffs; p – Won Presidents' Trophy

=== Record vs. opponents ===
==== Vs. Wales Conference ====
1989–90 NHL records Vs. Adams Division
Team	BOS	BUF	HFD	MTL	QUE	Total
Boston	—	4–3–1	4–3–1	4–3–1	6–1–1	**18–10–4**
Buffalo	3–4–1	—	6–2	4–3–1	7–0–1	**20–9–3**
Hartford	3–4–1	2–6	—	3–4–1	6–1–1	**14–15–3**
Montreal	3–4–1	3–4–1	4–3–1	—	7–1	**17–12–3**
Quebec	1–6–1	0–7–1	1–6–1	1–7	—	**3–26–3**

1989–90 NHL records Vs. Patrick Division
Team	NJD	NYI	NYR	PHI	PIT	WSH	Total
Boston	1–1–1	1–1–1	0–3	3–0	2–1	2–1	**9–7–2**
Buffalo	1–2	0–3	2–0–1	2–1	3–0	1–1–1	**9–7–2**
Hartford	2–1	2–1	1–2	2–1	2–0–1	2–1	**11–6–2**
Montreal	2–1	2–1	3–0	0–2–1	2–1	1–2	**10–7–1**
Quebec	0–3	2–1	0–3	1–1–1	1–2	0–3	**4–13–1**

==== Vs. Campbell Conference ====
1989–90 NHL records Vs. Norris Division
Team	CHI	DET	MIN	STL	TOR	Total
Boston	3–0	3–0	2–1	2–1	2–1	**12–3–0**
Buffalo	1–2	2–1	1–1–1	1–2	2–1	**7–7–1**
Hartford	1–2	2–0–1	2–1	1–2	1–1–1	**7–6–2**
Montreal	1–2	1–0–2	2–1	1–0–2	2–1	**7–4–4**
Quebec	1–2	0–3	1–2	0–3	0–3	**2–13–0**

1989–90 NHL records Vs. Smythe Division
Team	CGY	EDM	LAK	VAN	WIN	Total
Boston	1–1–1	2–0–1	2–1	1–2	1–1–1	**7–5–3**
Buffalo	1–1–1	1–2	2–1	2–0–1	3–0	**9–4–2**
Hartford	0–2–1	1–0–2	2–1	2–1	1–2	**6–6–3**
Montreal	2–1	1–1–1	1–1–1	2–1	1–1–1	**7–5–3**
Quebec	0–1–2	0–3	0–3	2–0–1	1–2	**3–9–3**

== Schedule and results ==
1989–90 regular season
October

Game	Result	Date	Score	Opponent	Record
1	L	October 5, 1989	1–4	Montreal Canadiens (1989–90)	0–1–0
2	L	October 7, 1989	4–6	Minnesota North Stars (1989–90)	0–2–0
3	W	October 8, 1989	9–6	@ Quebec Nordiques (1989–90)	1–2–0
4	W	October 11, 1989	4–1	Washington Capitals (1989–90)	2–2–0
5	L	October 13, 1989	1–4	@ Buffalo Sabres (1989–90)	2–3–0
6	L	October 14, 1989	2–3	New Jersey Devils (1989–90)	2–4–0
7	W	October 18, 1989	2–1	Buffalo Sabres (1989–90)	3–4–0
8	L	October 19, 1989	3–7	@ New York Rangers (1989–90)	3–5–0
9	T	October 21, 1989	3–3 OT	Detroit Red Wings (1989–90)	3–5–1
10	L	October 23, 1989	2–3	@ Montreal Canadiens (1989–90)	3–6–1
11	W	October 25, 1989	2–0	Quebec Nordiques (1989–90)	4–6–1
12	W	October 26, 1989	7–3	@ New Jersey Devils (1989–90)	5–6–1
13	W	October 28, 1989	1–0	@ Boston Bruins (1989–90)	6–6–1

November

Game	Result	Date	Score	Opponent	Record
14	L	November 1, 1989	3–5	St. Louis Blues (1989–90)	6–7–1
15	W	November 3, 1989	4–3	@ Detroit Red Wings (1989–90)	7–7–1
16	W	November 4, 1989	6–3	Los Angeles Kings (1989–90)	8–7–1
17	L	November 8, 1989	3–6	Buffalo Sabres (1989–90)	8–8–1
18	W	November 10, 1989	4–2	@ Winnipeg Jets (1989–90)	9–8–1
19	L	November 12, 1989	2–4	@ Chicago Blackhawks (1989–90)	9–9–1
20	W	November 14, 1989	3–0	@ Detroit Red Wings (1989–90)	10–9–1
21	L	November 15, 1989	2–5	Boston Bruins (1989–90)	10–10–1
22	L	November 18, 1989	2–3	New York Rangers (1989–90)	10–11–1
23	L	November 22, 1989	2–4	Quebec Nordiques (1989–90)	10–12–1
24	W	November 25, 1989	5–2	Philadelphia Flyers (1989–90)	11–12–1
25	L	November 26, 1989	2–4	@ Buffalo Sabres (1989–90)	11–13–1
26	L	November 28, 1989	2–4	Buffalo Sabres (1989–90)	11–14–1
27	W	November 30, 1989	5–3	@ St. Louis Blues (1989–90)	12–14–1

December

Game	Result	Date	Score	Opponent	Record
28	W	December 2, 1989	4–3	@ Montreal Canadiens (1989–90)	13–14–1
29	L	December 6, 1989	3–4	New York Islanders (1989–90)	13–15–1
30	W	December 7, 1989	4–3	@ Boston Bruins (1989–90)	14–15–1
31	W	December 9, 1989	7–3	New Jersey Devils (1989–90)	15–15–1
32	L	December 13, 1989	2–5	Los Angeles Kings (1989–90)	15–16–1
33	W	December 14, 1989	3–2	@ Philadelphia Flyers (1989–90)	16–16–1
34	L	December 16, 1989	2–5	Washington Capitals (1989–90)	16–17–1
35	W	December 19, 1989	8–4	@ Pittsburgh Penguins (1989–90)	17–17–1
36	W	December 20, 1989	4–3	Boston Bruins (1989–90)	18–17–1
37	W	December 23, 1989	4–3	Minnesota North Stars (1989–90)	19–17–1
38	T	December 26, 1989	3–3 OT	@ Quebec Nordiques (1989–90)	19–17–2
39	L	December 30, 1989	3–7	@ Chicago Blackhawks (1989–90)	19–18–2

January

Game	Result	Date	Score	Opponent	Record
40	L	January 3, 1990	2–4	Winnipeg Jets (1989–90)	19–19–2
41	L	January 5, 1990	4–6	@ Calgary Flames (1989–90)	19–20–2
42	T	January 6, 1990	4–4 OT	@ Edmonton Oilers (1989–90)	19–20–3
43	W	January 10, 1990	3–1	@ Vancouver Canucks (1989–90)	20–20–3
44	W	January 13, 1990	6–3	@ Los Angeles Kings (1989–90)	21–20–3
45	L	January 15, 1990	1–4	@ Boston Bruins (1989–90)	21–21–3
46	T	January 17, 1990	5–5 OT	Boston Bruins (1989–90)	21–21–4
47	T	January 19, 1990	3–3 OT	Calgary Flames (1989–90)	21–21–5
48	W	January 23, 1990	4–2	New York Islanders (1989–90)	22–21–5
49	L	January 25, 1990	2–3	@ St. Louis Blues (1989–90)	22–22–5
50	W	January 27, 1990	6–4	Chicago Blackhawks (1989–90)	23–22–5
51	T	January 30, 1990	4–4 OT	Edmonton Oilers (1989–90)	23–22–6

February

Game	Result	Date	Score	Opponent	Record
52	L	February 1, 1990	1–2	@ Philadelphia Flyers (1989–90)	23–23–6
53	W	February 3, 1990	5–1	@ Quebec Nordiques (1989–90)	24–23–6
54	L	February 4, 1990	0–2	@ Montreal Canadiens (1989–90)	24–24–6
55	W	February 7, 1990	5–3	@ Minnesota North Stars (1989–90)	25–24–6
56	L	February 9, 1990	1–4	Vancouver Canucks (1989–90)	25–25–6
57	W	February 10, 1990	6–2	Toronto Maple Leafs (1989–90)	26–25–6
58	T	February 14, 1990	6–6 OT	@ Toronto Maple Leafs (1989–90)	26–25–7
59	L	February 17, 1990	3–7	@ Montreal Canadiens (1989–90)	26–26–7
60	W	February 18, 1990	6–4	@ Buffalo Sabres (1989–90)	27–26–7
61	W	February 21, 1990	3–2	Quebec Nordiques (1989–90)	28–26–7
62	L	February 23, 1990	3–7	@ Buffalo Sabres (1989–90)	28–27–7
63	L	February 24, 1990	1–3	Winnipeg Jets (1989–90)	28–28–7
64	W	February 28, 1990	3–1	Montreal Canadiens (1989–90)	29–28–7

March

Game	Result	Date	Score	Opponent	Record
65	W	March 2, 1990	4–3	@ Washington Capitals (1989–90)	30–28–7
66	W	March 3, 1990	6–4	New York Rangers (1989–90)	31–28–7
67	W	March 6, 1990	4–2	@ New York Islanders (1989–90)	32–28–7
68	L	March 8, 1990	6–7	Toronto Maple Leafs (1989–90)	32–29–7
69	L	March 10, 1990	0–5	Buffalo Sabres (1989–90)	32–30–7
70	L	March 11, 1990	3–4	Boston Bruins (1989–90)	32–31–7
71	W	March 13, 1990	1–0	@ Vancouver Canucks (1989–90)	33–31–7
72	L	March 17, 1990	4–5	@ Calgary Flames (1989–90)	33–32–7
73	W	March 18, 1990	3–1	@ Edmonton Oilers (1989–90)	34–32–7
74	W	March 21, 1990	4–1	Quebec Nordiques (1989–90)	35–32–7
75	W	March 24, 1990	7–4	Montreal Canadiens (1989–90)	36–32–7
76	W	March 25, 1990	4–2	Pittsburgh Penguins (1989–90)	37–32–7
77	T	March 27, 1990	3–3 OT	@ Pittsburgh Penguins (1989–90)	37–32–8
78	L	March 29, 1990	2–3	@ Boston Bruins (1989–90)	37–33–8
79	W	March 31, 1990	3–2	@ Quebec Nordiques (1989–90)	38–33–8

April

Game	Result	Date	Score	Opponent	Record
80	T	April 1, 1990	1–1 OT	Montreal Canadiens (1989–90)	38–33–9

Legend: Win (2 points) Loss (0 points) Tie (1 point)

== Playoffs ==
=== Bruins 4, Whalers 3 ===
==== Adams Division Semi-finals ====
===== (1) Boston Bruins vs. (4) Hartford Whalers =====
April 5	Hartford Whalers	4 – 3	Boston Bruins	Boston Garden	Recap
Krygier (1) - (Verbeek, Francis) - 5:42		First period	No scoring
Evason (1) - (Tippett) - 2:41; Young (1) - (Ferraro, Tomlak) - 6:16; Ladouceur (1) - (Krygier, Shaw) - 9:19		Second period	6:29 - Neely (1) - (Poulin, Bourque); 15:46 - Carpenter (1) - (Neely)
No scoring		Third period	19:38 - pp - Poulin (1) - (Carter)
Sidorkiewicz (1-0) (33 saves / 36 shots)		Goalie stats	Lemelin (0-1) (13 saves / 17 shots)

April 7	Hartford Whalers	1 – 3	Boston Bruins	Boston Garden	Recap
No scoring		First period	10:58 - pp - Bourque (1) - (Galley, Propp)
Krygier (2) - (Verbeek, Ferraro) - 7:42		Second period	14:06 - pp - Galley (1) - (Bourque, Carpenter)
No scoring		Third period	6:57 - pp - Carpenter (2) - (Neely, Burridge)
Sidorkiewicz (1-1) (32 saves / 35 shots)		Goalie stats	Moog (1-0) (25 saves / 26 shots)

April 9	Boston Bruins	3 – 5	Hartford Whalers	Hartford Civic Center	Recap
Carpenter (3) - pp - (Neely, Janney) - 7:59; Christian (1) - pp - (Poulin, Propp) - 17:20		First period	12:13 - pp - Shaw (1) - (Francis, Andersson); 14:41 - pp - Verbeek (1) - (Andersson, Shaw)
No scoring		Second period	No scoring
Burridge (1) - (Janney, Wiemer) - 8:25		Third period	0:36 - Babych (1) - (Shaw); 2:13 - Verbeek (2) - (Francis, Shaw); 19:42 - en - Dineen (1) - (Tippett)
Moog (1-1) (22 saves / 26 shots)		Goalie stats	Sidorkiewicz (2-1) (22 saves / 25 shots)

April 11	Boston Bruins	6 – 5	Hartford Whalers	Hartford Civic Center	Recap
No scoring		First period	1:18 - Evason (2) - (Unassisted)
Christian (2) - (Janney, Carter) - 4:35; Wesley (1) - (Carpenter, Douris) - 10:24		Second period	2:04 - Shaw (2) - (Unassisted); 7:02 - Dineen (2) - (Babych, Andersson); 8:29 - Corriveau (1) - (Hull, Babych)
Poulin (2) - (Wesley) - 1:28; Beers (1) - (Janney, Neely) - 7:00; Christian (3) - (Poulin, Burridge) - 8:10; Poulin (3) - (Burridge, Neely) - 18:16		Third period	No scoring
Moog (2-1) (7 saves / 7 shots); Lemelin (17 saves / 22 shots)		Goalie stats	Sidorkiewicz (2-2) (23 saves / 29 shots)

April 13	Hartford Whalers	2 – 3	Boston Bruins	Boston Garden	Recap
Samuelsson (1) - (Tippett, Dineen) - 9:36		First period	15:18 - pp - Propp (1) - (Janney, Wesley); 17:27 - pp - Neely (2) - (Janney, Propp)
Tippett (1) - (Dineen) - 15:56		Second period	18:07 - sh - Neely (3) - (Unassisted)
No scoring		Third period	No scoring
Sidorkiewicz (2-3) (15 saves / 18 shots)		Goalie stats	Moog (3-1) (20 saves / 22 shots)

April 15	Boston Bruins	2 – 3	OT	Hartford Whalers	Hartford Civic Center	Recap
No scoring		First period		6:31 - Young (2) - (Evason, Ferraro)
Poulin (4) - (Burridge, D. Sweeney) - 9:00		Second period		1:35 - Francis (2) - (Unassisted)
Burridge (2) - (Unassisted) - 1:05		Third period		No scoring
No scoring		First overtime period		12:30 - Dineen (3) - (Evason)
Moog (3-2) (23 saves / 26 shots)		Goalie stats		Sidorkiewicz (3-3) (23 saves / 25 shots)

April 17	Hartford Whalers	1 – 3	Boston Bruins	Boston Garden	Recap
No scoring		First period	1:30 - Byce (1) - (Carter, Bourque); 7:29 - pp - Janney (1) - (Neely, Wesley)
No scoring		Second period	15:22 - Neely (4) - (Janney)
Francis (3) - pp - (Shaw) - 13:48		Third period	No scoring
Sidorkiewicz (3-4) (22 saves / 25 shots)		Goalie stats	Moog (4-2) (27 saves / 28 shots)

Boston wins series 4 – 3

== Transactions ==
The Whalers were involved in the following transactions during the 1989–90 season.

=== Trades ===
June 17, 1989	To New Jersey Devils Sylvain Turgeon	To Hartford Whalers Pat Verbeek
October 7, 1989	To Minnesota North Stars Kevin Sullivan	To Hartford Whalers Mike Berger
October 10, 1989	To Edmonton Oilers Norm Maciver	To Hartford Whalers Jim Ennis
October 31, 1989	To New Jersey Devils Jim Thomson	To Hartford Whalers Chris Cichocki
December 13, 1989	To Winnipeg Jets Paul MacDermid	To Hartford Whalers Randy Cunneyworth
March 3, 1990	To Boston Bruins Steve Dykstra	To Hartford Whalers Jeff Sirkka
March 5, 1990	To Washington Capitals Mike Liut	To Hartford Whalers Yvon Corriveau
March 6, 1990	To Edmonton Oilers Marc Laforge	To Hartford Whalers Cam Brauer

=== Waivers ===
October 2, 1989	From Buffalo Sabres Mikael Andersson
December 1, 1989	To Quebec Nordiques Brian Lawton

=== Free agents ===
Player	Former team
Daryl Reaugh	Edmonton Oilers
Steve Dykstra	Pittsburgh Penguins
Emanuel Viveiros	Minnesota North Stars

== Draft picks ==
Hartford's draft picks at the 1989 NHL entry draft held at the Met Center in Bloomington, Minnesota.

Round	#	Player	Nationality	College/Junior/Club team (League)
1	10	Bobby Holik	Czechoslovakia	Dukla Jihlava (Czechoslovakia)
3	52	Blair Atcheynum	Canada	Moose Jaw Warriors (WHL)
4	73	Jim McKenzie	Canada	Victoria Cougars (WHL)
5	94	James Black	Canada	Portland Winter Hawks (WHL)
6	115	Jerome Bechard	Canada	Moose Jaw Warriors (WHL)
7	136	Scott Daniels	Canada	Regina Pats (WHL)
8	157	Raymond Saumier	Canada	Trois-Rivières Draveurs (QMJHL)
9	178	Michel Picard	Canada	Trois-Rivières Draveurs (QMJHL)
10	199	Trevor Buchanan	Canada	Kamloops Blazers (WHL)
11	220	John Battice	Canada	London Knights (OHL)
12	241	Peter Kasowski	Canada	Swift Current Broncos (WHL)
S	15	Chris Tancill	United States	University of Wisconsin (WCHA)

== See also ==
- 1989–90 NHL season
