= 1989–90 Buffalo Sabres season =

NHL hockey team season

1989–90 Buffalo Sabres
- Division: 2nd Adams
- Conference: 2nd Wales
- 1989–90 record: 45–27–8
- Home record: 27–11–2
- Road record: 18–16–6
- Goals for: 286
- Goals against: 248

Team information
- General manager: Gerry Meehan
- Coach: Rick Dudley
- Captain: Mike Foligno
- Alternate captains: Phil Housley; Mike Ramsey
- Arena: Buffalo Memorial Auditorium

Team leaders
- Goals: Dave Andreychuk and Pierre Turgeon (40)
- Assists: Pierre Turgeon (66)
- Points: Pierre Turgeon (106)
- Penalty minutes: Mike Hartman (211)
- Wins: Daren Puppa (31)
- Goals against average: Daren Puppa (2.89)

The 1989–90 Buffalo Sabres season was the Sabres' 20th season in the National Hockey League (NHL). They finished the season with the third best record in the NHL. The season also featured the NHL debuts of Alexander Mogilny, Rob Ray, and Donald Audette.

== Offseason ==
=== NHL draft ===
Round	Pick	Player	Nationality	College/Junior/Club team
1	14	Kevin Haller (D)	Canada	Regina Pats (WHL)
3	56	Scott Thomas (RW)	United States	Nichols School (USHS-NY)
4	77	Doug MacDonald (C)	Canada	University of Wisconsin (NCAA)
5	98	Ken Sutton (D)	Canada	Saskatoon Blades (WHL)
6	107	Bill Pye (G)	United States	Northern Michigan University (WCHA)
6	119	Mike Barkley (C)	Canada	University of Maine (Hockey East)
8	161	Derek Plante (C)	United States	Cloquet High School (USHS-MN)
9	183	Donald Audette (RW)	Canada	Laval Titan (QMJHL)
10	194	Mark Astley (D)	Canada	Lake Superior State University (CCHA)
10	203	John Nelson (C)	Canada	Toronto Marlboros (OHL)
11	224	Todd Henderson (G)	Canada	Thunder Bay Flyers (USHL)
12	245	Mike Bavis (RW)	United States	Cushing Academy (USHS-MA)
S	19	Ian Boyce (LW)	Canada	University of Vermont (Hockey East)

== Regular season ==
=== Season standings ===
Adams Division
	GP	W	L	T	GF	GA	Pts
**Boston Bruins**	80	46	25	9	289	232	101
**Buffalo Sabres**	80	45	27	8	286	248	98
**Montreal Canadiens**	80	41	28	11	288	234	93
**Hartford Whalers**	80	38	33	9	275	268	85
Quebec Nordiques	80	12	61	7	240	407	31

Note: GP = Games played, W = Wins, L = Losses, T = Ties, Pts = Points, GF = Goals for, GA = Goals against
Note: Teams that qualified for the playoffs are highlighted in bold.

Wales Conference
R		Div	GP	W	L	T	GF	GA	Pts
**1**	**p – Boston Bruins**	**ADM**	**80**	**46**	**25**	**9**	**289**	**232**	**101**
**2**	**Buffalo Sabres**	**ADM**	**80**	**45**	**27**	**8**	**286**	**248**	**98**
**3**	**Montreal Canadiens**	**ADM**	**80**	**41**	**28**	**11**	**288**	**234**	**93**
**4**	**Hartford Whalers**	**ADM**	**80**	**38**	**33**	**9**	**275**	**268**	**85**
**5**	**New York Rangers**	**PTK**	**80**	**36**	**31**	**13**	**279**	**267**	**85**
**6**	**New Jersey Devils**	**PTK**	**80**	**37**	**34**	**9**	**295**	**288**	**83**
**7**	**Washington Capitals**	**PTK**	**80**	**36**	**38**	**6**	**284**	**275**	**78**
**8**	**New York Islanders**	**PTK**	**80**	**31**	**38**	**11**	**281**	**288**	**73**
9	Pittsburgh Penguins	PTK	80	32	40	8	318	359	72
10	Philadelphia Flyers	PTK	80	30	39	11	290	297	71
11	Quebec Nordiques	ADM	80	12	61	7	240	407	31

Divisions: PTK – Patrick, ADM – Adams

bold – Qualified for playoffs; p – Won Presidents' Trophy

=== Record vs. opponents ===
==== Vs. Wales Conference ====
1989–90 NHL records Vs. Adams Division
Team	**BOS**	**BUF**	**HFD**	**MTL**	**QUE**	**Total**
Boston	—	4–3–1	4–3–1	4–3–1	6–1–1	**18–10–4**
Buffalo	3–4–1	—	6–2	4–3–1	7–0–1	**20–9–3**
Hartford	3–4–1	2–6	—	3–4–1	6–1–1	**14–15–3**
Montreal	3–4–1	3–4–1	4–3–1	—	7–1	**17–12–3**
Quebec	1–6–1	0–7–1	1–6–1	1–7	—	**3–26–3**

1989–90 NHL records Vs. Patrick Division
Team	**NJD**	**NYI**	**NYR**	**PHI**	**PIT**	**WSH**	**Total**
Boston	1–1–1	1–1–1	0–3	3–0	2–1	2–1	**9–7–2**
Buffalo	1–2	0–3	2–0–1	2–1	3–0	1–1–1	**9–7–2**
Hartford	2–1	2–1	1–2	2–1	2–0–1	2–1	**11–6–2**
Montreal	2–1	2–1	3–0	0–2–1	2–1	1–2	**10–7–1**
Quebec	0–3	2–1	0–3	1–1–1	1–2	0–3	**4–13–1**

==== Vs. Campbell Conference ====
1989–90 NHL records Vs. Norris Division
Team	**CHI**	**DET**	**MIN**	**STL**	**TOR**	**Total**
Boston	3–0	3–0	2–1	2–1	2–1	**12–3–0**
Buffalo	1–2	2–1	1–1–1	1–2	2–1	**7–7–1**
Hartford	1–2	2–0–1	2–1	1–2	1–1–1	**7–6–2**
Montreal	1–2	1–0–2	2–1	1–0–2	2–1	**7–4–4**
Quebec	1–2	0–3	1–2	0–3	0–3	**2–13–0**

1989–90 NHL records Vs. Smythe Division
Team	**CGY**	**EDM**	**LAK**	**VAN**	**WIN**	**Total**
Boston	1–1–1	2–0–1	2–1	1–2	1–1–1	**7–5–3**
Buffalo	1–1–1	1–2	2–1	2–0–1	3–0	**9–4–2**
Hartford	0–2–1	1–0–2	2–1	2–1	1–2	**6–6–3**
Montreal	2–1	1–1–1	1–1–1	2–1	1–1–1	**7–5–3**
Quebec	0–1–2	0–3	0–3	2–0–1	1–2	**3–9–3**

== Schedule and results ==
1989–90 regular season
October

Game	Result	Date	Score	Opponent	Record
1	W	October 5, 1989	4–3	Quebec Nordiques (1989–90)	1–0–0
2	L	October 7, 1989	1–5	@ Montreal Canadiens (1989–90)	1–1–0
3	T	October 8, 1989	2–2 OT	Minnesota North Stars (1989–90)	1–1–1
4	W	October 11, 1989	7–1	@ Toronto Maple Leafs (1989–90)	2–1–1
5	W	October 13, 1989	4–1	Hartford Whalers (1989–90)	3–1–1
6	L	October 14, 1989	2–6	@ Detroit Red Wings (1989–90)	3–2–1
7	L	October 18, 1989	1–2	@ Hartford Whalers (1989–90)	3–3–1
8	W	October 20, 1989	6–2	Montreal Canadiens (1989–90)	4–3–1
9	W	October 21, 1989	4–2	@ Pittsburgh Penguins (1989–90)	5–3–1
10	L	October 25, 1989	2–4	@ Minnesota North Stars (1989–90)	5–4–1
11	W	October 27, 1989	6–5 OT	Toronto Maple Leafs (1989–90)	6–4–1
12	W	October 29, 1989	4–3	Boston Bruins (1989–90)	7–4–1

November

Game	Result	Date	Score	Opponent	Record
13	W	November 2, 1989	4–3	@ Montreal Canadiens (1989–90)	8–4–1
14	T	November 4, 1989	3–3 OT	@ Boston Bruins (1989–90)	8–4–2
15	W	November 5, 1989	5–3	Los Angeles Kings (1989–90)	9–4–2
16	W	November 8, 1989	6–3	@ Hartford Whalers (1989–90)	10–4–2
17	W	November 10, 1989	4–2	Vancouver Canucks (1989–90)	11–4–2
18	W	November 12, 1989	6–5	Edmonton Oilers (1989–90)	12–4–2
19	T	November 16, 1989	4–4 OT	@ Calgary Flames (1989–90)	12–4–3
20	L	November 17, 1989	0–3	@ Edmonton Oilers (1989–90)	12–5–3
21	T	November 19, 1989	2–2 OT	@ Vancouver Canucks (1989–90)	12–5–4
22	W	November 22, 1989	4–1	New York Rangers (1989–90)	13–5–4
23	W	November 25, 1989	3–2	@ Quebec Nordiques (1989–90)	14–5–4
24	W	November 26, 1989	4–2	Hartford Whalers (1989–90)	15–5–4
25	W	November 28, 1989	4–2	@ Hartford Whalers (1989–90)	16–5–4
26	L	November 30, 1989	1–5	@ Boston Bruins (1989–90)	16–6–4

December

Game	Result	Date	Score	Opponent	Record
27	W	December 1, 1989	6–4	New Jersey Devils (1989–90)	17–6–4
28	W	December 3, 1989	4–3	St. Louis Blues (1989–90)	18–6–4
29	L	December 5, 1989	0–3	@ New York Islanders (1989–90)	18–7–4
30	L	December 7, 1989	3–4 OT	@ Philadelphia Flyers (1989–90)	18–8–4
31	W	December 10, 1989	4–3	Washington Capitals (1989–90)	19–8–4
32	L	December 13, 1989	2–4	Boston Bruins (1989–90)	19–9–4
33	W	December 16, 1989	3–1	@ Boston Bruins (1989–90)	20–9–4
34	W	December 17, 1989	4–3	Philadelphia Flyers (1989–90)	21–9–4
35	T	December 20, 1989	2–2 OT	@ New York Rangers (1989–90)	21–9–5
36	T	December 22, 1989	2–2 OT	Montreal Canadiens (1989–90)	21–9–6
37	W	December 23, 1989	6–5	@ Quebec Nordiques (1989–90)	22–9–6
38	W	December 26, 1989	6–3	Detroit Red Wings (1989–90)	23–9–6
39	L	December 29, 1989	3–4 OT	Boston Bruins (1989–90)	23–10–6
40	L	December 31, 1989	2–4	New York Islanders (1989–90)	23–11–6

January

Game	Result	Date	Score	Opponent	Record
41	L	January 2, 1990	3–5	@ New Jersey Devils (1989–90)	23–12–6
42	L	January 6, 1990	3–6	@ Montreal Canadiens (1989–90)	23–13–6
43	L	January 7, 1990	1–2	Boston Bruins (1989–90)	23–14–6
44	L	January 11, 1990	3–5	@ Calgary Flames (1989–90)	23–15–6
45	W	January 13, 1990	5–3	@ Vancouver Canucks (1989–90)	24–15–6
46	W	January 16, 1990	4–2	@ Los Angeles Kings (1989–90)	25–15–6
47	L	January 19, 1990	3–6	Washington Capitals (1989–90)	25–16–6
48	W	January 23, 1990	3–2	@ Philadelphia Flyers (1989–90)	26–16–6
49	W	January 24, 1990	3–2	@ Chicago Blackhawks (1989–90)	27–16–6
50	L	January 26, 1990	2–4	Chicago Blackhawks (1989–90)	27–17–6
51	W	January 28, 1990	7–2	Pittsburgh Penguins (1989–90)	28–17–6
52	W	January 30, 1990	5–2	@ Quebec Nordiques (1989–90)	29–17–6
53	W	January 31, 1990	6–3	Quebec Nordiques (1989–90)	30–17–6

February

Game	Result	Date	Score	Opponent	Record
54	L	February 3, 1990	0–1	@ Montreal Canadiens (1989–90)	30–18–6
55	L	February 4, 1990	0–1	New York Islanders (1989–90)	30–19–6
56	W	February 7, 1990	3–1	Montreal Canadiens (1989–90)	31–19–6
57	W	February 9, 1990	3–2	New York Rangers (1989–90)	32–19–6
58	L	February 11, 1990	2–4	@ St. Louis Blues (1989–90)	32–20–6
59	L	February 13, 1990	1–4	@ Chicago Blackhawks (1989–90)	32–21–6
60	W	February 16, 1990	5–3	Montreal Canadiens (1989–90)	33–21–6
61	L	February 18, 1990	4–6	Hartford Whalers (1989–90)	33–22–6
62	W	February 20, 1990	4–3 OT	@ Winnipeg Jets (1989–90)	34–22–6
63	L	February 21, 1990	3–7	@ Edmonton Oilers (1989–90)	34–23–6
64	W	February 23, 1990	7–3	Hartford Whalers (1989–90)	35–23–6
65	W	February 25, 1990	3–1	Winnipeg Jets (1989–90)	36–23–6
66	L	February 27, 1990	1–4	@ St. Louis Blues (1989–90)	36–24–6

March

Game	Result	Date	Score	Opponent	Record
67	T	March 3, 1990	3–3 OT	@ Quebec Nordiques (1989–90)	36–24–7
68	W	March 4, 1990	5–3	Quebec Nordiques (1989–90)	37–24–7
69	T	March 6, 1990	1–1 OT	@ Washington Capitals (1989–90)	37–24–8
70	W	March 8, 1990	10–4	@ Boston Bruins (1989–90)	38–24–8
71	W	March 10, 1990	5–0	@ Hartford Whalers (1989–90)	39–24–8
72	L	March 14, 1990	5–6 OT	Los Angeles Kings (1989–90)	39–25–8
73	L	March 16, 1990	3–4	Toronto Maple Leafs (1989–90)	39–26–8
74	W	March 18, 1990	4–3 OT	Winnipeg Jets (1989–90)	40–26–8
75	W	March 21, 1990	5–4	Calgary Flames (1989–90)	41–26–8
76	L	March 25, 1990	3–4	New Jersey Devils (1989–90)	41–27–8
77	W	March 27, 1990	6–5	@ Detroit Red Wings (1989–90)	42–27–8
78	W	March 29, 1990	4–2	Minnesota North Stars (1989–90)	43–27–8
79	W	March 31, 1990	3–2 OT	@ Pittsburgh Penguins (1989–90)	44–27–8

April

Game	Result	Date	Score	Opponent	Record
80	W	April 1, 1990	5–2	Quebec Nordiques (1989–90)	45–27–8

Legend: Win (2 points) Loss (0 points) Tie (1 point)

== Playoffs ==
1990 Stanley Cup playoffs

April 5	Montreal Canadiens	1-4	Buffalo Sabres	Buffalo Memorial Auditorium

April 7	Montreal Canadiens	3-0	Buffalo Sabres	Buffalo Memorial Auditorium

April 9	Buffalo Sabres	1-2	OT	Montreal Canadiens	Montreal Forum

April 11	Buffalo Sabres	4-2	Montreal Canadiens	Montreal Forum

April 13	Montreal Canadiens	4-2	Buffalo Sabres	Buffalo Memorial Auditorium

April 15	Buffalo Sabres	2-5	Montreal Canadiens	Montreal Forum

Montreal won series 4-2

== Awards and records ==
- Daren Puppa, Goaltender, NHL All-Star Game Appearance
- Pierre Turgeon, Phil Housley, Dave Andreychuk, NHL All-Star Game Appearance
- Daren Puppa, Goaltender, NHL Second Team All-Star
