= 1989–90 New Jersey Devils season =

National Hockey League season

1989–90 New Jersey Devils
- Division: 2nd Patrick
- Conference: 5th Wales
- 1989–90 record: 37–34–9
- Home record: 22–15–3
- Road record: 15–19–6
- Goals for: 295
- Goals against: 288

Team information
- General manager: Lou Lamoriello
- Coach: John Cunniff
- Captain: Kirk Muller
- Alternate captains: John MacLean; Patrik Sundstrom
- Arena: Brendan Byrne Arena

Team leaders
- Goals: John MacLean (41)
- Assists: Kirk Muller (56)
- Points: Kirk Muller (86)
- Penalty minutes: Ken Daneyko (216)
- Plus/minus: John MacLean (+17)
- Wins: Sean Burke (22)
- Goals against average: Chris Terreri (3.42)

The 1989–90 New Jersey Devils season was the 16th season for the National Hockey League (NHL) franchise that was established on June 11, 1974, and eighth season since the franchise relocated from Colorado prior to the 1982–83 NHL season. The season saw the Devils make the playoffs for the second time and only the third time in franchise history. The Devils were eliminated in the first round by the Washington Capitals.

== Regular season ==
=== Season standings ===
Patrick Division
	GP	W	L	T	GF	GA	Pts
**New York Rangers**	80	36	31	13	279	267	85
**New Jersey Devils**	80	37	34	9	295	288	83
**Washington Capitals**	80	36	38	6	284	275	78
**New York Islanders**	80	31	38	11	281	288	73
Pittsburgh Penguins	80	32	40	8	318	359	72
Philadelphia Flyers	80	30	39	11	290	297	71

Note: GP = Games played, W = Wins, L = Losses, T = Ties, Pts = Points, GF = Goals for, GA = Goals against
Note: Teams that qualified for the playoffs are highlighted in bold.

Wales Conference
R		Div	GP	W	L	T	GF	GA	Pts
**1**	**p – Boston Bruins**	**ADM**	**80**	**46**	**25**	**9**	**289**	**232**	**101**
**2**	**Buffalo Sabres**	**ADM**	**80**	**45**	**27**	**8**	**286**	**248**	**98**
**3**	**Montreal Canadiens**	**ADM**	**80**	**41**	**28**	**11**	**288**	**234**	**93**
**4**	**Hartford Whalers**	**ADM**	**80**	**38**	**33**	**9**	**275**	**268**	**85**
**5**	**New York Rangers**	**PTK**	**80**	**36**	**31**	**13**	**279**	**267**	**85**
**6**	**New Jersey Devils**	**PTK**	**80**	**37**	**34**	**9**	**295**	**288**	**83**
**7**	**Washington Capitals**	**PTK**	**80**	**36**	**38**	**6**	**284**	**275**	**78**
**8**	**New York Islanders**	**PTK**	**80**	**31**	**38**	**11**	**281**	**288**	**73**
9	Pittsburgh Penguins	PTK	80	32	40	8	318	359	72
10	Philadelphia Flyers	PTK	80	30	39	11	290	297	71
11	Quebec Nordiques	ADM	80	12	61	7	240	407	31

Divisions: PTK – Patrick, ADM – Adams

bold – Qualified for playoffs; p – Won Presidents' Trophy

=== Record vs. opponents ===
==== Vs. Wales Conference ====
**Vs. Patrick Division**

1989–90 NHL records
Team	**NJD**	**NYI**	**NYR**	**PHI**	**PIT**	**WSH**	**Total**
New Jersey	—	4–1–2	3–3–1	4–2–1	4–2–1	3–4	18–12–5
N.Y. Islanders	1–4–2	—	2–3–2	1–4–2	3–3–1	4–3	11–17–7
N.Y. Rangers	3–3–1	3–2–2	—	5–2	1–5–1	3–4	15–16–4
Philadelphia	2–4–1	4–1–2	2–5	—	4–3	1–5–1	13–18–4
Pittsburgh	2–4–1	3–3–1	5–1–1	3–4	—	5–2	18–14–3
Washington	4–3	3–4	4–3	5–1–1	2–5	—	18–16–1

**Vs. Adams Division**

1989–90 NHL records
Team	**BOS**	**BUF**	**HFD**	**MTL**	**QUE**	**Total**
New Jersey	1–1–1	2–1	1–2	1–2	3–0	8–6–1
N.Y. Islanders	1–1–1	3–0	1–2	1–2	1–2	7–7–1
N.Y. Rangers	3–0	0–2–1	2–1	0–3	3–0	8–6–1
Philadelphia	0–3	1–2	1–2	2–0–1	1–1–1	5–8–2
Pittsburgh	1–2	0–3	0–2–1	1–2	2–1	4–10–1
Washington	1–2	1–1–1	1–2	2–1	3–0	8–6–1

==== Vs. Campbell Conference ====
**Vs. Norris Division**

1989–90 NHL records
Team	**CHI**	**DET**	**MIN**	**STL**	**TOR**	**Total**
New Jersey	2–1	1–1–1	1–2	2–1	1–2	7–7–1
N.Y. Islanders	1–2	1–1–1	1–2	1–2	3–0	7–7–1
N.Y. Rangers	1–0–2	2–0–1	1–1–1	0–2–1	1–1–1	5–4–6
Philadelphia	0–3	0–1–2	2–1	2–1	2–1	6–7–2
Pittsburgh	0–3	2–0–1	1–1–1	0–3	1–2	4–9–2
Washington	1–2	3–0	3–0	0–2–1	1–2	8–6–1

**Vs. Smythe Division**

1989–90 NHL records
Team	**CGY**	**EDM**	**LAK**	**VAN**	**WIN**	**Total**
New Jersey	0–3	1–0–2	2–1	0–3	1–2	4–9–2
N.Y. Islanders	0–3	0–1–2	2–1	2–1	2–1	6–7–2
N.Y. Rangers	1–2	2–0–1	1–2	3–0	1–1–1	8–5–2
Philadelphia	1–1–1	1–2	3–0	0–1–2	1–2	6–6–3
Pittsburgh	0–2–1	2–1	1–2	1–2	2–0–1	6–7–2
Washington	1–0–2	1–2	0–3	0–2–1	0–3	2–10–3

== Schedule and results ==
1989–90 regular season
October

Game	Result	Date	Score	Opponent	Record
1	W	October 5, 1989	6–2	@ Philadelphia Flyers (season)	1–0–0
2	T	October 7, 1989	4–4 OT	Pittsburgh Penguins (season)	1–0–1
3	L	October 10, 1989	2–4	Calgary Flames (season)	1–1–1
4	L	October 13, 1989	3–4 OT	Montreal Canadiens (season)	1–2–1
5	W	October 14, 1989	3–2	@ Hartford Whalers (season)	2–2–1
6	W	October 18, 1989	5–3	Philadelphia Flyers (season)	3–2–1
7	L	October 20, 1989	2–3	Vancouver Canucks (season)	3–3–1
8	W	October 21, 1989	5–4	@ Montreal Canadiens (season)	4–3–1
9	W	October 23, 1989	5–4	@ Toronto Maple Leafs (season)	5–3–1
10	L	October 26, 1989	3–7	Hartford Whalers (season)	5–4–1
11	W	October 28, 1989	3–2	Chicago Blackhawks (season)	6–4–1
12	L	October 31, 1989	3–4	@ Vancouver Canucks (season)	6–5–1

November

Game	Result	Date	Score	Opponent	Record
13	T	November 1, 1989	6–6 OT	@ Edmonton Oilers (season)	6–5–2
14	L	November 4, 1989	3–7	@ Calgary Flames (season)	6–6–2
15	W	November 8, 1989	6–3	Quebec Nordiques (season)	7–6–2
16	L	November 11, 1989	5–7	Philadelphia Flyers (season)	7–7–2
17	T	November 12, 1989	3–3 OT	@ Philadelphia Flyers (season)	7–7–3
18	L	November 15, 1989	1–2 OT	Minnesota North Stars (season)	7–8–3
19	W	November 17, 1989	5–4 OT	New York Rangers (season)	8–8–3
20	L	November 18, 1989	4–6	@ Boston Bruins (season)	8–9–3
21	W	November 22, 1989	6–3	@ Pittsburgh Penguins (season)	9–9–3
22	L	November 24, 1989	6–7	@ Minnesota North Stars (season)	9–10–3
23	W	November 25, 1989	3–1	@ Winnipeg Jets (season)	10–10–3
24	W	November 28, 1989	3–2 OT	New York Islanders (season)	11–10–3

December

Game	Result	Date	Score	Opponent	Record
25	L	December 1, 1989	4–6	@ Buffalo Sabres (season)	11–11–3
26	L	December 2, 1989	3–5	Washington Capitals (season)	11–12–3
27	L	December 6, 1989	3–5	@ New York Rangers (season)	11–13–3
28	L	December 8, 1989	2–3	Pittsburgh Penguins (season)	11–14–3
29	L	December 9, 1989	3–7	@ Hartford Whalers (season)	11–15–3
30	W	December 12, 1989	7–2	@ New York Islanders (season)	12–15–3
31	W	December 13, 1989	5–2	New York Islanders (season)	13–15–3
32	W	December 15, 1989	7–5	Los Angeles Kings (season)	14–15–3
33	W	December 17, 1989	3–1	Boston Bruins (season)	15–15–3
34	L	December 19, 1989	4–5 OT	@ New York Islanders (season)	15–16–3
35	W	December 22, 1989	5–4 OT	@ Philadelphia Flyers (season)	16–16–3
36	W	December 23, 1989	3–2	St. Louis Blues (season)	17–16–3
37	T	December 26, 1989	4–4 OT	@ New York Rangers (season)	17–16–4
38	L	December 27, 1989	1–3	Washington Capitals (season)	17–17–4
39	W	December 29, 1989	3–2	New York Rangers (season)	18–17–4
40	L	December 31, 1989	4–6	@ Detroit Red Wings (season)	18–18–4

January

Game	Result	Date	Score	Opponent	Record
41	W	January 2, 1990	5–3	Buffalo Sabres (season)	19–18–4
42	W	January 4, 1990	4–2	Los Angeles Kings (season)	20–18–4
43	L	January 8, 1990	3–4	Winnipeg Jets (season)	20–19–4
44	W	January 10, 1990	6–3	Pittsburgh Penguins (season)	21–19–4
45	L	January 12, 1990	2–5	Montreal Canadiens (season)	21–20–4
46	W	January 13, 1990	5–4	@ Quebec Nordiques (season)	22–20–4
47	L	January 16, 1990	6–9	@ Washington Capitals (season)	22–21–4
48	W	January 23, 1990	4–2	@ Pittsburgh Penguins (season)	23–21–4
49	W	January 24, 1990	3–2	Washington Capitals (season)	24–21–4
50	L	January 26, 1990	1–5	Toronto Maple Leafs (season)	24–22–4
51	T	January 28, 1990	4–4 OT	@ New York Islanders (season)	24–22–5
52	L	January 30, 1990	2–5	@ Los Angeles Kings (season)	24–23–5

February

Game	Result	Date	Score	Opponent	Record
53	L	February 4, 1990	2–4	@ Vancouver Canucks (season)	24–24–5
54	T	February 6, 1990	2–2 OT	Edmonton Oilers (season)	24–24–6
55	W	February 9, 1990	5–3	@ Washington Capitals (season)	25–24–6
56	L	February 10, 1990	0–7	@ St. Louis Blues (season)	25–25–6
57	T	February 12, 1990	1–1 OT	Detroit Red Wings (season)	25–25–7
58	L	February 16, 1990	1–2	New York Rangers (season)	25–26–7
59	L	February 17, 1990	4–5	@ Toronto Maple Leafs (season)	25–27–7
60	L	February 19, 1990	3–4 OT	@ New York Rangers (season)	25–28–7
61	L	February 22, 1990	2–4	Winnipeg Jets (season)	25–29–7
62	W	February 24, 1990	3–2	Chicago Blackhawks (season)	26–29–7
63	T	February 25, 1990	3–3 OT	@ New York Islanders (season)	26–29–8
64	L	February 28, 1990	1–2	@ Pittsburgh Penguins (season)	26–30–8

March

Game	Result	Date	Score	Opponent	Record
65	W	March 2, 1990	6–5	Pittsburgh Penguins (season)	27–30–8
66	L	March 4, 1990	3–4	@ Washington Capitals (season)	27–31–8
67	W	March 6, 1990	2–1	St. Louis Blues (season)	28–31–8
68	W	March 8, 1990	4–2	New York Islanders (season)	29–31–8
69	W	March 10, 1990	9–3	Quebec Nordiques (season)	30–31–8
70	W	March 13, 1990	3–1	@ Minnesota North Stars (season)	31–31–8
71	L	March 15, 1990	4–5	@ Calgary Flames (season)	31–32–8
72	W	March 17, 1990	4–1	@ Edmonton Oilers (season)	32–32–8
73	L	March 20, 1990	2–3	Philadelphia Flyers (season)	32–33–8
74	L	March 22, 1990	3–6	@ Chicago Blackhawks (season)	32–34–8
75	W	March 24, 1990	5–2	@ Philadelphia Flyers (season)	33–34–8
76	W	March 25, 1990	4–3	@ Buffalo Sabres (season)	34–34–8
77	W	March 27, 1990	4–1	Washington Capitals (season)	35–34–8
78	W	March 29, 1990	6–4	New York Rangers (season)	36–34–8
79	W	March 31, 1990	5–1	Detroit Red Wings (season)	37–34–8

April

Game	Result	Date	Score	Opponent	Record
80	T	April 1, 1990	3–3 OT	@ Boston Bruins (season)	37–34–9

Legend: Win (2 points) Loss (0 points) Tie (1 point)

== Playoffs ==
=== Patrick Division Semifinals ===
==== (P2) New Jersey Devils vs. (P3) Washington Capitals ====
The first two games took place at the Meadowlands in New Jersey. In Game 1, Washington beat New Jersey 5–4 in overtime. In Game 2, the Devils won 6–5. Games 3 and 4 took place at Capital Centre. The Devils were victorious in Game 3 2–1, but their series lead was abruptly halted by the Capitals in game 4 when they won 3–1. Game 5 went back to New Jersey, and the Capitals took a 4–3 win. Game 6 was back at Capital Centre where the Capitals took a 3–2 win over the Devils and won the series 4–2.

== Player statistics ==
=== Regular season ===
Scoring

Player	Pos	GP	G	A	Pts	PIM	+/-	PPG	SHG	GWG
Kirk Muller	LW	80	30	56	86	74	-1	9	0	6
John MacLean	RW	80	41	38	79	80	17	10	3	11
Patrik Sundstrom	C	74	27	49	76	34	15	8	1	0
Brendan Shanahan	LW	73	30	42	72	137	15	8	0	5
Bruce Driver	D	75	7	46	53	63	6	1	0	0
Sylvain Turgeon	LW	72	30	17	47	81	-8	7	0	3
Mark Johnson	C	63	16	29	45	12	-8	4	0	1
Viacheslav Fetisov	D	72	8	34	42	52	9	2	0	0
Doug Brown	RW	69	14	20	34	16	7	1	3	3
Janne Ojanen	C	64	17	13	30	12	-5	1	0	1
Tommy Albelin	D	68	6	23	29	63	-1	4	0	0
David Maley	LW	67	8	17	25	160	-2	0	0	2
Ken Daneyko	D	74	6	15	21	216	15	0	1	1
Alexei Kasatonov	D	39	6	15	21	16	15	1	0	0
Aaron Broten	LW/C	42	10	8	18	36	-15	1	2	0
Bob Brooke	C	35	8	10	18	30	3	0	0	1
Walt Poddubny	LW	33	4	10	14	28	-4	1	0	0
Jon Morris	C	20	6	7	13	8	12	2	0	1
Peter Stastny	C	12	5	6	11	16	-1	2	0	1
Eric Weinrich	D	19	2	7	9	11	1	1	0	1
Craig Wolanin	D	37	1	7	8	47	-13	0	0	0
Reijo Ruotsalainen	D	31	2	5	7	14	-4	1	0	0
Pat Conacher	LW	19	3	3	6	4	2	0	0	0
Randy Velischek	D	62	0	6	6	72	4	0	0	0
Jamie Huscroft	D	42	2	3	5	149	-2	0	0	0
Jim Korn	D/LW	37	2	3	5	99	-1	0	0	0
Neil Brady	C	19	1	4	5	13	-1	0	0	0
Peter Sundstrom	LW	21	1	2	3	4	1	0	0	0
Claude Vilgrain	RW	6	1	2	3	4	-1	0	0	0
Paul Ysebaert	C	5	1	2	3	0	0	0	0	0
Sean Burke	G	52	0	1	1	38	0	0	0	0
Sergei Starikov	D	16	0	1	1	8	-8	0	0	0
Troy Crowder	RW	10	0	0	0	23	0	0	0	0
Tom Kurvers	D	1	0	0	0	0	-1	0	0	0
Chris Terreri	G	35	0	0	0	0	0	0	0	0
Jim Thomson	RW	3	0	0	0	31	-3	0	0	0

Goaltending

Player	MIN	GP	W	L	T	GA	GAA	SO	SA	SV	SV%
Sean Burke	2914	52	22	22	6	175	3.60	0	1453	1278	.880
Chris Terreri	1931	35	15	12	3	110	3.42	0	1004	894	.890
Team:	4845	80	37	34	9	285	3.53	0	2457	2172	.884

=== Playoffs ===
Scoring

Player	Pos	GP	G	A	Pts	PIM	PPG	SHG	GWG
Brendan Shanahan	LW	6	3	3	6	20	1	0	1
Bruce Driver	D	6	1	5	6	6	0	0	0
John MacLean	RW	6	4	1	5	12	2	1	0
Peter Stastny	C	6	3	2	5	2	1	0	1
Jon Morris	C	6	1	3	4	23	1	0	0
Kirk Muller	LW	6	1	3	4	11	0	0	0
Patrik Sundstrom	C	6	1	3	4	2	0	0	0
Eric Weinrich	D	6	1	3	4	17	0	0	0
Alexei Kasatonov	D	6	0	3	3	14	0	0	0
Ken Daneyko	D	6	2	0	2	21	0	0	0
Viacheslav Fetisov	D	6	0	2	2	10	0	0	0
Pat Conacher	LW	5	1	0	1	10	0	0	0
Doug Brown	RW	6	0	1	1	2	0	0	0
Bob Brooke	C	5	0	0	0	14	0	0	0
Sean Burke	G	2	0	0	0	2	0	0	0
Troy Crowder	RW	2	0	0	0	10	0	0	0
Jamie Huscroft	D	5	0	0	0	16	0	0	0
Mark Johnson	C	2	0	0	0	0	0	0	0
David Maley	LW	6	0	0	0	25	0	0	0
Chris Terreri	G	4	0	0	0	0	0	0	0
Sylvain Turgeon	LW	1	0	0	0	0	0	0	0
Randy Velischek	D	6	0	0	0	4	0	0	0
Claude Vilgrain	RW	4	0	0	0	0	0	0	0

Goaltending

Player	MIN	GP	W	L	GA	GAA	SO	SA	SV	SV%
Chris Terreri	238	4	2	2	13	3.28	0	103	90	.874
Sean Burke	125	2	0	2	8	3.84	0	57	49	.860
Team:	363	6	2	4	21	3.47	0	160	139	.869

Note: GP = Games played; G = Goals; A = Assists; Pts = Points; +/- = Plus/minus; PIM = Penalty minutes; PPG = Power-play goals; SHG = Short-handed goals; GWG = Game-winning goals
MIN = Minutes played; W = Wins; L = Losses; T = Ties; GA = Goals against; GAA = Goals against average; SO = Shutouts; SA = Shots against; SV = Shots saved; SV% = Save percentage;

== Draft picks ==
The Devils' draft picks at the 1989 NHL entry draft.

Rd #	Pick #	Player	Nat	Pos	Team (League)	Notes
1	5	Bill Guerin	United States	RW	Springfield Olympics (NEJHL)	
1	18	Jason Miller	Canada	C	Medicine Hat Tigers (WHL)	(Note: The Devils acquired the 1989 first-round draft pick from Los Angeles for Corey Foster on June 17, 1989.)
2	26	Jarrod Skalde	Canada	C	Oshawa Generals (OHL)	
3	47	Scott Pellerin	Canada	LW	University of Maine (Hockey East)	
4	68	No fourth-round pick				(Note: The Devils traded their 1989 fourth-round pick (used on Niklas Andersson) to Quebec for Tommy Albelin on December 12, 1988.)
5	89	Mike Heinke	United States	G	Avon Old Farms H.S. (Connecticut)	
6	110	David Emma	United States	RW	Boston College (Hockey East)	
7	131	No seventh-round pick				(Note: The Devils traded their 1989 seventh-round pick (used on Doug Evans) and Alain Chevrier to Winnipeg for Steve Rooney and the Jets' 1990 third-round pick (Bombardir) on June 19, 1988. The official Devils transaction page incorrectly lists Evans' pick as 1990.)
8	152	Sergei Starikov	Soviet Union	D	CSKA Moscow (Soviet League)	
9	173	Andre Faust	Canada	LW	Princeton University (ECAC)	
10	194	No tenth-round pick				(Note: The Devils traded their 1989 tenth-round pick (used on Mark Astley) and a 1987 third-round pick (used on Andrew MacVicar) to the Buffalo Sabres for Tom Kurvers on June 13, 1987.)
11	215	Jason Simon	Canada	W	Windsor Compuware Spitfires (OHL)	
12	236	Peter Larsson	Sweden	C	Södertälje SK (Elitserien)	
S	5	C. J. Young	United States	RW	Harvard University (ECAC)	
S	10	Mark Romaine	United States	G	Providence College (Hockey East)	

== See also ==
- 1989–90 NHL season
