= 1989–90 Vancouver Canucks season =

20th season in franchise history

1989–90 Vancouver Canucks
- Division: 5th Smythe
- Conference: 10th Campbell
- 1989–90 record: 25–41–14
- Home record: 13–16–11
- Road record: 12–25–3
- Goals for: 245
- Goals against: 306

Team information
- General manager: Pat Quinn
- Coach: Bob McCammon
- Captain: Stan Smyl
- Alternate captains: Paul Reinhart; Garth Butcher; Rich Sutter; Doug Lidster; Larry Melnyk
- Arena: Pacific Coliseum
- Average attendance: 15,417

Team leaders
- Goals: Greg Adams (30)
- Assists: Paul Reinhart (40)
- Points: Paul Reinhart (57)
- Penalty minutes: Ronnie Stern (208)
- Wins: Kirk McLean (21)
- Goals against average: Kirk McLean (3.87)

The 1989–90 Vancouver Canucks season was the team's 20th in the National Hockey League (NHL).

== Regular season ==
=== Final standings ===
Smythe Division
	GP	W	L	T	GF	GA	Pts
**Calgary Flames**	80	42	23	15	348	265	99
**Edmonton Oilers**	80	38	28	14	315	283	90
**Winnipeg Jets**	80	37	32	11	298	290	85
**Los Angeles Kings**	80	34	39	7	338	337	75
Vancouver Canucks	80	25	41	14	245	306	64

Note: GP = Games played, W = Wins, L = Losses, T = Ties, Pts = Points, GF = Goals for, GA = Goals against
Note: Teams that qualified for the playoffs are highlighted in bold.

Campbell Conference
R		Div	GP	W	L	T	GF	GA	Pts
**1**	**Calgary Flames**	**SMY**	**80**	**42**	**23**	**15**	**348**	**265**	**99**
**2**	**Edmonton Oilers**	**SMY**	**80**	**38**	**28**	**14**	**315**	**283**	**90**
**3**	**Chicago Blackhawks**	**NRS**	**80**	**41**	**33**	**6**	**316**	**294**	**88**
**4**	**Winnipeg Jets**	**SMY**	**80**	**37**	**32**	**11**	**298**	**290**	**85**
**5**	**St. Louis Blues**	**NRS**	**80**	**37**	**34**	**9**	**295**	**279**	**83**
**6**	**Toronto Maple Leafs**	**NRS**	**80**	**38**	**38**	**4**	**337**	**358**	**80**
**7**	**Minnesota North Stars**	**NRS**	**80**	**36**	**40**	**4**	**284**	**291**	**76**
**8**	**Los Angeles Kings**	**SMY**	**80**	**34**	**39**	**7**	**338**	**337**	**75**
9	Detroit Red Wings	NRS	80	28	38	14	288	323	70
10	Vancouver Canucks	SMY	80	25	41	14	245	306	64

Divisions: NRS – Norris, SMY – Smythe

bold – Qualified for playoffs

=== Record vs. opponents ===
==== Vs. Campbell Conference ====
**Vs. Smythe Division**

1989–90 NHL records
Team	**CGY**	**EDM**	**LAK**	**VAN**	**WIN**	**Total**
Calgary	—	4–3–1	4–3–1	5–1–2	3–5	**16–12–4**
Edmonton	3–4–1	—	4–2–2	6–1–1	5–3	**18–10–4**
Los Angeles	3–4–1	2–4–2	—	4–2–2	2–5–1	**11–15–6**
Vancouver	1–5–2	1–6–1	2–4–2	—	2–3–3	**6–18–8**
Winnipeg	5–3	3–5	5–2–1	3–3–2	—	**16–13–3**

**Vs. Norris Division**

1989–90 NHL records
Team	**CHI**	**DET**	**MIN**	**STL**	**TOR**	**Total**
Calgary	2–0–1	1–2	2–1	2–0–1	2–1	**9–4–2**
Edmonton	1–2	1–2	3–0	2–0–1	1–2	**8–6–1**
Los Angeles	1–2	2–1	1–2	2–1	1–2	**7–8–0**
Vancouver	1–2	1–1–1	2–1	1–2	1–2	**6–8–1**
Winnipeg	1–2	1–1–1	1–2	1–1–1	2–0–1	**6–6–3**

Vs. Wales Conference

**Vs. Adams Division**

1989–90 NHL records
Team	**BOS**	**BUF**	**HFD**	**MTL**	**QUE**	**Total**
Calgary	1–1–1	1–1–1	2–0–1	1–2	1–0–2	**6–4–5**
Edmonton	0–2–1	2–1	0–1–2	1–1–1	3–0	**6–5–4**
Los Angeles	1–2	1–2	1–2	1–1–1	3–0	**7–7–1**
Vancouver	2–1	0–2–1	1–2	1–2	0–2–1	**4–9–2**
Winnipeg	1–1–1	0–3	2–1	1–1–1	2–1	**6–7–2**

**Vs. Patrick Division**

1989–90 NHL records
Team	**NJD**	**NYI**	**NYR**	**PHI**	**PIT**	**WSH**	**Total**
Calgary	3–0	3–0	2–1	1–1–1	2–0–1	0–1–2	**11–3–4**
Edmonton	0–1–2	1–0–2	0–2–1	2–1	1–2	2–1	**6–7–5**
Los Angeles	1–2	1–2	2–1	0–3	2–1	3–0	**9–9–0**
Vancouver	3–0	1–2	0–3	1–0–2	2–1	2–0–1	**9–6–3**
Winnipeg	2–1	1–2	1–1–1	2–1	0–2–1	3–0	**9–7–2**

== Schedule and results ==
1989–90 regular season
October

Game	Result	Date	Score	Opponent	Record
1	L	October 5, 1989	1–4	Edmonton Oilers (1989–90)	0–1–0
2	W	October 7, 1989	5–3	Detroit Red Wings (1989–90)	1–1–0
3	L	October 9, 1989	2–5	New York Islanders (1989–90)	1–2–0
4	W	October 11, 1989	5–2	@ Edmonton Oilers (1989–90)	2–2–0
5	L	October 13, 1989	5–6	Los Angeles Kings (1989–90)	2–3–0
6	W	October 15, 1989	7–6	Boston Bruins (1989–90)	3–3–0
7	L	October 18, 1989	3–4	@ Toronto Maple Leafs (1989–90)	3–4–0
8	W	October 20, 1989	3–2	@ New Jersey Devils (1989–90)	4–4–0
9	W	October 21, 1989	2–1	@ New York Islanders (1989–90)	5–4–0
10	L	October 23, 1989	3–5	@ New York Rangers (1989–90)	5–5–0
11	T	October 27, 1989	5–5 OT	@ Calgary Flames (1989–90)	5–5–1
12	W	October 28, 1989	4–3	Calgary Flames (1989–90)	6–5–1
13	W	October 31, 1989	4–3	New Jersey Devils (1989–90)	7–5–1

November

Game	Result	Date	Score	Opponent	Record
14	L	November 3, 1989	2–3	Winnipeg Jets (1989–90)	7–6–1
15	W	November 5, 1989	5–3	Pittsburgh Penguins (1989–90)	8–6–1
16	L	November 8, 1989	2–3 OT	@ Winnipeg Jets (1989–90)	8–7–1
17	L	November 10, 1989	2–4	@ Buffalo Sabres (1989–90)	8–8–1
18	L	November 11, 1989	2–3	@ Quebec Nordiques (1989–90)	8–9–1
19	T	November 14, 1989	4–4 OT	Washington Capitals (1989–90)	8–9–2
20	W	November 16, 1989	4–3	Chicago Blackhawks (1989–90)	9–9–2
21	T	November 19, 1989	2–2 OT	Buffalo Sabres (1989–90)	9–9–3
22	L	November 21, 1989	3–4	@ Edmonton Oilers (1989–90)	9–10–3
23	L	November 25, 1989	4–7	@ Los Angeles Kings (1989–90)	9–11–3
24	T	November 26, 1989	3–3 OT	Los Angeles Kings (1989–90)	9–11–4
25	L	November 29, 1989	2–3 OT	Toronto Maple Leafs (1989–90)	9–12–4

December

Game	Result	Date	Score	Opponent	Record
26	L	December 1, 1989	3–4	New York Rangers (1989–90)	9–13–4
27	W	December 3, 1989	6–5	Minnesota North Stars (1989–90)	10–13–4
28	L	December 6, 1989	4–5 OT	@ Los Angeles Kings (1989–90)	10–14–4
29	L	December 9, 1989	4–6	@ St. Louis Blues (1989–90)	10–15–4
30	L	December 10, 1989	1–7	@ Chicago Blackhawks (1989–90)	10–16–4
31	W	December 12, 1989	4–2	@ Minnesota North Stars (1989–90)	11–16–4
32	T	December 13, 1989	3–3 OT	@ Winnipeg Jets (1989–90)	11–16–5
33	T	December 15, 1989	3–3 OT	Winnipeg Jets (1989–90)	11–16–6
34	T	December 17, 1989	2–2 OT	Quebec Nordiques (1989–90)	11–16–7
35	L	December 19, 1989	1–2	Calgary Flames (1989–90)	11–17–7
36	L	December 20, 1989	1–2 OT	@ Calgary Flames (1989–90)	11–18–7
37	L	December 23, 1989	1–4	@ Los Angeles Kings (1989–90)	11–19–7
38	W	December 27, 1989	2–1	Montreal Canadiens (1989–90)	12–19–7
39	T	December 31, 1989	2–2 OT	Philadelphia Flyers (1989–90)	12–19–8

January

Game	Result	Date	Score	Opponent	Record
40	L	January 2, 1990	1–4	@ Detroit Red Wings (1989–90)	12–20–8
41	L	January 4, 1990	3–4	@ Pittsburgh Penguins (1989–90)	12–21–8
42	W	January 5, 1990	5–2	@ Washington Capitals (1989–90)	13–21–8
43	L	January 7, 1990	3–5	@ Montreal Canadiens (1989–90)	13–22–8
44	L	January 10, 1990	1–3	Hartford Whalers (1989–90)	13–23–8
45	L	January 12, 1990	2–5	St. Louis Blues (1989–90)	13–24–8
46	L	January 13, 1990	3–5	Buffalo Sabres (1989–90)	13–25–8
47	L	January 16, 1990	0–3	@ New York Islanders (1989–90)	13–26–8
48	W	January 18, 1990	3–2 OT	@ Philadelphia Flyers (1989–90)	14–26–8
49	L	January 19, 1990	2–5	@ Chicago Blackhawks (1989–90)	14–27–8
50	T	January 23, 1990	3–3 OT	Los Angeles Kings (1989–90)	14–27–9
51	L	January 26, 1990	3–6	Minnesota North Stars (1989–90)	14–28–9
52	L	January 27, 1990	2–6	@ Edmonton Oilers (1989–90)	14–29–9
53	L	January 30, 1990	2–7	Calgary Flames (1989–90)	14–30–9

February

Game	Result	Date	Score	Opponent	Record
54	L	February 1, 1990	3–4 OT	@ Calgary Flames (1989–90)	14–31–9
55	L	February 2, 1990	1–8	@ Winnipeg Jets (1989–90)	14–32–9
56	W	February 4, 1990	4–2	New Jersey Devils (1989–90)	15–32–9
57	W	February 6, 1990	5–3	Winnipeg Jets (1989–90)	16–32–9
58	W	February 9, 1990	4–1	@ Hartford Whalers (1989–90)	17–32–9
59	W	February 11, 1990	4–2	@ Boston Bruins (1989–90)	18–32–9
60	L	February 13, 1990	3–5	@ Quebec Nordiques (1989–90)	18–33–9
61	L	February 14, 1990	1–10	@ Montreal Canadiens (1989–90)	18–34–9
62	T	February 16, 1990	2–2 OT	Edmonton Oilers (1989–90)	18–34–10
63	L	February 18, 1990	2–7	Boston Bruins (1989–90)	18–35–10
64	L	February 20, 1990	2–4	Edmonton Oilers (1989–90)	18–36–10
65	W	February 24, 1990	6–4	@ Los Angeles Kings (1989–90)	19–36–10
66	W	February 26, 1990	5–2	Toronto Maple Leafs (1989–90)	20–36–10
67	T	February 28, 1990	7–7 OT	Philadelphia Flyers (1989–90)	20–36–11

March

Game	Result	Date	Score	Opponent	Record
68	L	March 3, 1990	1–5	@ Calgary Flames (1989–90)	20–37–11
69	L	March 4, 1990	3–6	@ Edmonton Oilers (1989–90)	20–38–11
70	T	March 9, 1990	4–4 OT	Calgary Flames (1989–90)	20–38–12
71	W	March 11, 1990	5–3	Pittsburgh Penguins (1989–90)	21–38–12
72	L	March 13, 1990	0–1	Hartford Whalers (1989–90)	21–39–12
73	W	March 15, 1990	6–5 OT	@ St. Louis Blues (1989–90)	22–39–12
74	W	March 17, 1990	3–1	@ Washington Capitals (1989–90)	23–39–12
75	L	March 18, 1990	2–5	@ New York Rangers (1989–90)	23–40–12
76	T	March 20, 1990	4–4 OT	@ Detroit Red Wings (1989–90)	23–40–13
77	W	March 23, 1990	4–2	@ Winnipeg Jets (1989–90)	24–40–13
78	T	March 25, 1990	3–3 OT	Winnipeg Jets (1989–90)	24–40–14
79	L	March 27, 1990	1–4	Edmonton Oilers (1989–90)	24–41–14
80	W	March 31, 1990	6–3	Los Angeles Kings (1989–90)	25–41–14

Legend: Win (2 points) Loss (0 points) Tie (1 point)

== Player statistics ==
=== Scoring leaders ===
Note: GP = Games played; G = Goals; A = Assists; Pts = Points; +/- = Plus/minus; PIM = Penalty minutes

Player	GP	G	A	Pts	+/-	PIM
Paul Reinhart	67	17	40	57	2	30
Trevor Linden	73	21	30	51	-17	43
Greg Adams	65	30	20	50	-8	18
Brian Bradley	67	19	29	48	5	65
Petri Skriko	77	15	33	48	-21	36

=== Goaltending ===
Note: GP = Games played; TOI = Time on ice (minutes); W = Wins; L = Losses; T = Ties; GA = Goals against; SO = Shutouts; Sv% = Save percentage; GAA = Goals against average

Player	GP	TOI	W	L	T	GA	SO	Sv%	GAA
Kirk McLean	63	3739	21	30	10	216	0	.880	3.28
Steve Weeks	21	1142	4	11	4	79	0	.873	4.15

== Draft picks ==
Vancouver's picks at the 1989 NHL entry draft in Bloomington, Minnesota.

Round	#	Player	Nationality	College/Junior/Club team (League)
1	8	Jason Herter (D)	Canada	University of North Dakota (NCAA)
2	29	Robert Woodward (LW)	United States	Deerfield Academy (USS)
4	71	Brett Hauer (D)	United States	Richfield High School (USS)
6	113	Pavel Bure (RW)	Soviet Union	CSKA Moscow (Soviet Hockey League)
7	134	James Revenberg (RW)	Canada	Windsor Compuware Spitfires (OHL)
8	155	Robert Sangster (LW)	Canada	Kitchener Rangers (OHL)
9	176	Sandy Moger (RW)	Canada	Lake Superior State University (NCAA)
10	197	Gus Morschauser (G)	Canada	Kitchener Rangers (OHL)
11	218	Hayden O'Rear (D)	United States	Lathrop High School (Alaska)
12	239	Darcy Cahill (C)	Canada	Cornwall Royals (OHL)
12	248	Jan Bergman (D)	Sweden	Södertälje SK (Elitserien)
S	13	Jeff Napierala (RW)	United States	Lake Superior State University (CCHA)

== Farm teams ==
Milwaukee Admirals (IHL)

== See also ==
- 1989–90 NHL season
