= 1989–90 Minnesota North Stars season =

National Hockey League team season

1989–90 Minnesota North Stars
- Division: 4th Norris
- Conference: 7th Campbell
- 1989–90 record: 36–40–4
- Home record: 26–12–2
- Road record: 10–28–2
- Goals for: 284
- Goals against: 291

Team information
- General manager: Jack Ferreira
- Coach: Pierre Page
- Captain: Curt Giles
- Alternate captains: Basil McRae; Unknown
- Arena: Met Center

Team leaders
- Goals: Brian Bellows (55)
- Assists: Neal Broten (62)
- Points: Brian Bellows (99)
- Penalty minutes: Shane Churla (292)
- Plus/minus: Stewart Gavin (+9)
- Wins: Jon Casey (31)
- Goals against average: Jon Casey (3.22)

The 1989–90 Minnesota North Stars season was the North Stars' 23rd season.

Coached by Pierre Page, the team compiled a record of 36–40–4 for 76 points to finish the regular season 4th in the Norris Division. The North Stars were nearly unbeatable at the Met Center, winning 26, the best in the Norris Division and third-best home record overall. In the playoffs, they lost the division semi-finals 4–3 to the Chicago Blackhawks.

== Offseason ==
=== NHL draft ===
Round	Pick	Player	Nationality	College/junior/club team
1	7	Doug Zmolek (D)	United States	Rochester John Marshall H.S. (USHS-MN)
2	28	Mike Craig (RW)	Canada	Oshawa Generals (OHL)
3	60	Murray Garbutt (C)	Canada	Medicine Hat Tigers (WHL)
4	75	J. F. Quintin (LW)	Canada	Shawinigan Cataractes (QMJHL)
5	87	Pat MacLeod (D)	Canada	Kamloops Blazers (WHL)
5	91	Bryan Schoen (G)	United States	Minnetonka High School (USHS-MN)
5	97	Rhys Hollyman (D)	Canada	Miami University (CCHA)
6	112	Scott Cashman (G)	Canada	Kanata (COJHL)
8	154	Jon Pratt (LW)	United States	Pingree High School (USHS-MA)
9	175	Kenneth Blum (C)	United States	St. Joseph Central High School (USHS-MA)
10	196	Arturs Irbe (G)	Soviet Union	Dinamo Riga (USSR)
11	217	Tom Pederson (D)	United States	University of Minnesota (WCHA)
12	238	Helmuts Balderis (RW)	Soviet Union	Dinamo Riga (USSR)
S	12	Jamie Loewen (G)	Canada	University of Alaska Fairbanks (CCHA)

== Regular season ==
=== Final standings ===
Norris Division
	GP	W	L	T	GF	GA	Pts
**Chicago Blackhawks**	80	41	33	6	315	294	88
**St. Louis Blues**	80	37	34	9	295	279	83
**Toronto Maple Leafs**	80	38	38	4	337	358	80
**Minnesota North Stars**	80	36	40	4	284	291	76
Detroit Red Wings	80	28	38	14	288	323	70

Note: GP = Games played, W = Wins, L = Losses, T = Ties, Pts = Points, GF = Goals for, GA = Goals against
Note: Teams that qualified for the playoffs are highlighted in bold.

Campbell Conference
R		Div	GP	W	L	T	GF	GA	Pts
**1**	**Calgary Flames**	**SMY**	**80**	**42**	**23**	**15**	**348**	**265**	**99**
**2**	**Edmonton Oilers**	**SMY**	**80**	**38**	**28**	**14**	**315**	**283**	**90**
**3**	**Chicago Blackhawks**	**NRS**	**80**	**41**	**33**	**6**	**316**	**294**	**88**
**4**	**Winnipeg Jets**	**SMY**	**80**	**37**	**32**	**11**	**298**	**290**	**85**
**5**	**St. Louis Blues**	**NRS**	**80**	**37**	**34**	**9**	**295**	**279**	**83**
**6**	**Toronto Maple Leafs**	**NRS**	**80**	**38**	**38**	**4**	**337**	**358**	**80**
**7**	**Minnesota North Stars**	**NRS**	**80**	**36**	**40**	**4**	**284**	**291**	**76**
**8**	**Los Angeles Kings**	**SMY**	**80**	**34**	**39**	**7**	**338**	**337**	**75**
9	Detroit Red Wings	NRS	80	28	38	14	288	323	70
10	Vancouver Canucks	SMY	80	25	41	14	245	306	64

Divisions: NRS – Norris, SMY – Smythe

bold – Qualified for playoffs

=== Record vs. opponents ===
==== Vs. Campbell Conference ====
**Vs. Norris Division**

1989–90 NHL records
Team	**CHI**	**DET**	**MIN**	**STL**	**TOR**	**Total**
Chicago	—	4–3–1	3–4–1	2–5–1	5–3	**14–15–3**
Detroit	3–4–1	—	4–4	3–4–1	4–3–1	**14–15–3**
Minnesota	4–3–1	4–4	—	4–4	5–3	**17–14–1**
St. Louis	5–2–1	4–3–1	4–4	—	1–7	**14–16–2**
Toronto	3–5	3–4–1	3–5	7–1	—	**16–15–1**

**Vs. Smythe Division**

1989–90 NHL records
Team	**CGY**	**EDM**	**LAK**	**VAN**	**WIN**	**Total**
Chicago	0–2–1	2–1	2–1	2–1	2–1	**8–6–1**
Detroit	2–1	2–1	1–2	1–1–1	1–1–1	**7–6–2**
Minnesota	1–2	0–3	2–1	1–2	2–1	**6–9–0**
St. Louis	0–2–1	0–2–1	1–2	2–1	1–1–1	**4–8–3**
Toronto	1–2	2–1	2–1	2–1	0–2–1	**7–7–1**

Vs. Wales Conference

**Vs. Adams Division**

1989–90 NHL records
Team	**BOS**	**BUF**	**HFD**	**MTL**	**QUE**	**Total**
Chicago	0–3	2–1	2–1	2–1	2–1	**8–7–0**
Detroit	0–3	1–2	0–2–1	0–1–2	3–0	**4–8–3**
Minnesota	1–2	1–1–1	1–2	1–2	2–1	**6–8–1**
St. Louis	1–2	2–1	2–1	0–1–2	3–0	**8–5–2**
Toronto	1–2	1–2	1–1–1	1–2	3–0	**7–7–1**

**Vs. Patrick Division**

1989–90 NHL records
Team	**NJD**	**NYI**	**NYR**	**PHI**	**PIT**	**WSH**	**Total**
Chicago	1–2	2–1	0–1–2	3–0	3–0	2–1	**11–5–2**
Detroit	1–1–1	1–1–1	0–2–1	1–0–2	0–2–1	0–3	**3–9–6**
Minnesota	2–1	2–1	1–1–1	1–2	1–1–1	0–3	**7–9–2**
St. Louis	1–2	2–1	2–0–1	1–2	3–0	2–0–1	**11–5–2**
Toronto	2–1	0–3	1–1–1	1–2	2–1	2–1	**8–9–1**

== Schedule and results ==
1989–90 regular season
October

Game	Result	Date	Score	Opponent	Record
1	W	October 5, 1989	6–5	New York Islanders (1989–90)	1–0–0
2	W	October 7, 1989	6–4	@ Hartford Whalers (1989–90)	2–0–0
3	T	October 8, 1989	2–2 OT	@ Buffalo Sabres (1989–90)	2–0–1
4	W	October 12, 1989	3–0	St. Louis Blues (1989–90)	3–0–1
5	W	October 14, 1989	3–2	Quebec Nordiques (1989–90)	4–0–1
6	W	October 17, 1989	6–3	@ New York Islanders (1989–90)	5–0–1
7	L	October 18, 1989	3–4	@ Detroit Red Wings (1989–90)	5–1–1
8	L	October 21, 1989	2–7	@ Quebec Nordiques (1989–90)	5–2–1
9	W	October 25, 1989	4–2	Buffalo Sabres (1989–90)	6–2–1
10	L	October 26, 1989	1–4	@ St. Louis Blues (1989–90)	6–3–1
11	W	October 28, 1989	6–5	Philadelphia Flyers (1989–90)	7–3–1
12	L	October 31, 1989	4–6	Toronto Maple Leafs (1989–90)	7–4–1

November

Game	Result	Date	Score	Opponent	Record
13	L	November 2, 1989	3–4 OT	@ Chicago Blackhawks (1989–90)	7–5–1
14	W	November 4, 1989	3–0	Chicago Blackhawks (1989–90)	8–5–1
15	L	November 6, 1989	1–2	@ Toronto Maple Leafs (1989–90)	8–6–1
16	W	November 9, 1989	5–1	Detroit Red Wings (1989–90)	9–6–1
17	W	November 11, 1989	3–2 OT	Calgary Flames (1989–90)	10–6–1
18	W	November 12, 1989	6–3	Toronto Maple Leafs (1989–90)	11–6–1
19	W	November 15, 1989	2–1 OT	@ New Jersey Devils (1989–90)	12–6–1
20	L	November 16, 1989	3–6	@ Philadelphia Flyers (1989–90)	12–7–1
21	W	November 18, 1989	3–0	St. Louis Blues (1989–90)	13–7–1
22	L	November 21, 1989	4–7	@ St. Louis Blues (1989–90)	13–8–1
23	W	November 22, 1989	6–3	Toronto Maple Leafs (1989–90)	14–8–1
24	W	November 24, 1989	7–6	New Jersey Devils (1989–90)	15–8–1
25	W	November 26, 1989	5–3	Chicago Blackhawks (1989–90)	16–8–1
26	L	November 30, 1989	2–5	@ Calgary Flames (1989–90)	16–9–1

December

Game	Result	Date	Score	Opponent	Record
27	L	December 2, 1989	1–6	@ Edmonton Oilers (1989–90)	16–10–1
28	L	December 3, 1989	5–6	@ Vancouver Canucks (1989–90)	16–11–1
29	L	December 6, 1989	1–4	Montreal Canadiens (1989–90)	16–12–1
30	L	December 8, 1989	1–2	@ Detroit Red Wings (1989–90)	16–13–1
31	L	December 9, 1989	1–3	Detroit Red Wings (1989–90)	16–14–1
32	L	December 12, 1989	2–4	Vancouver Canucks (1989–90)	16–15–1
33	T	December 14, 1989	4–4 OT	Pittsburgh Penguins (1989–90)	16–15–2
34	W	December 16, 1989	4–3	@ Toronto Maple Leafs (1989–90)	17–15–2
35	L	December 19, 1989	0–5	Edmonton Oilers (1989–90)	17–16–2
36	L	December 21, 1989	2–4	@ Boston Bruins (1989–90)	17–17–2
37	L	December 23, 1989	3–4	@ Hartford Whalers (1989–90)	17–18–2
38	L	December 26, 1989	3–5	@ Winnipeg Jets (1989–90)	17–19–2
39	T	December 28, 1989	1–1 OT	@ Chicago Blackhawks (1989–90)	17–19–3
40	L	December 30, 1989	2–3	@ St. Louis Blues (1989–90)	17–20–3
41	W	December 31, 1989	2–1 OT	St. Louis Blues (1989–90)	18–20–3

January

Game	Result	Date	Score	Opponent	Record
42	W	January 4, 1990	8–2	New York Rangers (1989–90)	19–20–3
43	W	January 6, 1990	4–3	Detroit Red Wings (1989–90)	20–20–3
44	L	January 9, 1990	0–9	@ Detroit Red Wings (1989–90)	20–21–3
45	L	January 11, 1990	4–8	New York Islanders (1989–90)	20–22–3
46	W	January 13, 1990	6–4	Detroit Red Wings (1989–90)	21–22–3
47	L	January 15, 1990	3–4	@ Montreal Canadiens (1989–90)	21–23–3
48	L	January 17, 1990	1–3	@ Chicago Blackhawks (1989–90)	21–24–3
49	W	January 18, 1990	7–4	Quebec Nordiques (1989–90)	22–24–3
50	L	January 24, 1990	3–7	@ Toronto Maple Leafs (1989–90)	22–25–3
51	W	January 26, 1990	6–3	@ Vancouver Canucks (1989–90)	23–25–3
52	L	January 27, 1990	1–3	@ Calgary Flames (1989–90)	23–26–3
53	W	January 29, 1990	4–2	Winnipeg Jets (1989–90)	24–26–3
54	L	January 31, 1990	3–4 OT	Washington Capitals (1989–90)	24–27–3

February

Game	Result	Date	Score	Opponent	Record
55	L	February 3, 1990	6–7 OT	@ Philadelphia Flyers (1989–90)	24–28–3
56	L	February 4, 1990	3–4	@ New York Rangers (1989–90)	24–29–3
57	L	February 7, 1990	3–5	Hartford Whalers (1989–90)	24–30–3
58	W	February 10, 1990	6–4	Chicago Blackhawks (1989–90)	25–30–3
59	L	February 11, 1990	3–5	@ Washington Capitals (1989–90)	25–31–3
60	L	February 13, 1990	1–2 OT	St. Louis Blues (1989–90)	25–32–3
61	W	February 15, 1990	6–3	Los Angeles Kings (1989–90)	26–32–3
62	L	February 18, 1990	2–3	@ Edmonton Oilers (1989–90)	26–33–3
63	L	February 21, 1990	2–4	@ Los Angeles Kings (1989–90)	26–34–3
64	L	February 24, 1990	2–3	Boston Bruins (1989–90)	26–35–3
65	W	February 27, 1990	8–3	Winnipeg Jets (1989–90)	27–35–3

March

Game	Result	Date	Score	Opponent	Record
66	W	March 3, 1990	3–2	Montreal Canadiens (1989–90)	28–35–3
67	L	March 4, 1990	6–8	@ Pittsburgh Penguins (1989–90)	28–36–3
68	W	March 7, 1990	5–4	Chicago Blackhawks (1989–90)	29–36–3
69	T	March 10, 1990	2–2 OT	New York Rangers (1989–90)	29–36–4
70	W	March 12, 1990	4–1	@ Toronto Maple Leafs (1989–90)	30–36–4
71	L	March 13, 1990	1–3	New Jersey Devils (1989–90)	30–37–4
72	W	March 17, 1990	6–2	@ Pittsburgh Penguins (1989–90)	31–37–4
73	L	March 18, 1990	3–4	Washington Capitals (1989–90)	31–38–4
74	W	March 20, 1990	5–2	Los Angeles Kings (1989–90)	32–38–4
75	W	March 22, 1990	5–1	@ Detroit Red Wings (1989–90)	33–38–4
76	W	March 24, 1990	7–6	@ Boston Bruins (1989–90)	34–38–4
77	W	March 26, 1990	5–4	Toronto Maple Leafs (1989–90)	35–38–4
78	L	March 29, 1990	2–4	@ Buffalo Sabres (1989–90)	35–39–4
79	W	March 31, 1990	6–3	@ St. Louis Blues (1989–90)	36–39–4

April

Game	Result	Date	Score	Opponent	Record
80	L	April 1, 1990	1–4	@ Chicago Blackhawks (1989–90)	36–40–4

Legend: Win (2 points) Loss (0 points) Tie (1 point)
