= 1989–90 St. Louis Blues season =

Hockey season

1989–90 St. Louis Blues
- Division: 2nd Norris
- Conference: 5th Campbell
- 1989–90 record: 37–34–9
- Home record: 20–15–5
- Road record: 17–19–4
- Goals for: 295
- Goals against: 279

Team information
- General manager: Ron Caron
- Coach: Brian Sutter
- Captain: Rick Meagher
- Arena: St. Louis Arena

Team leaders
- Goals: Brett Hull (72)
- Assists: Adam Oates (79)
- Points: Brett Hull (113)
- Penalty minutes: Kelly Chase (244)
- Wins: Vincent Riendeau (17)
- Goals against average: Greg Millen (2.94)

The 1989–90 St. Louis Blues season was the St. Louis Blues' 23rd season in the National Hockey League (NHL).

== Offseason ==
Team captain Bernie Federko is traded to the Detroit Red Wings. Forward Rick Meagher is named team captain.

== Regular season ==
=== Final standings ===
Norris Division
	GP	W	L	T	GF	GA	Pts
**Chicago Blackhawks**	80	41	33	6	315	294	88
**St. Louis Blues**	80	37	34	9	295	279	83
**Toronto Maple Leafs**	80	38	38	4	337	358	80
**Minnesota North Stars**	80	36	40	4	284	291	76
Detroit Red Wings	80	28	38	14	288	323	70

Note: GP = Games played, W = Wins, L = Losses, T = Ties, Pts = Points, GF = Goals for, GA = Goals against
Note: Teams that qualified for the playoffs are highlighted in bold.

Campbell Conference
R		Div	GP	W	L	T	GF	GA	Pts
**1**	**Calgary Flames**	**SMY**	**80**	**42**	**23**	**15**	**348**	**265**	**99**
**2**	**Edmonton Oilers**	**SMY**	**80**	**38**	**28**	**14**	**315**	**283**	**90**
**3**	**Chicago Blackhawks**	**NRS**	**80**	**41**	**33**	**6**	**316**	**294**	**88**
**4**	**Winnipeg Jets**	**SMY**	**80**	**37**	**32**	**11**	**298**	**290**	**85**
**5**	**St. Louis Blues**	**NRS**	**80**	**37**	**34**	**9**	**295**	**279**	**83**
**6**	**Toronto Maple Leafs**	**NRS**	**80**	**38**	**38**	**4**	**337**	**358**	**80**
**7**	**Minnesota North Stars**	**NRS**	**80**	**36**	**40**	**4**	**284**	**291**	**76**
**8**	**Los Angeles Kings**	**SMY**	**80**	**34**	**39**	**7**	**338**	**337**	**75**
9	Detroit Red Wings	NRS	80	28	38	14	288	323	70
10	Vancouver Canucks	SMY	80	25	41	14	245	306	64

Divisions: NRS – Norris, SMY – Smythe

bold – Qualified for playoffs

=== Record vs. opponents ===
==== Vs. Campbell Conference ====
**Vs. Norris Division**

1989–90 NHL records
Team	**CHI**	**DET**	**MIN**	**STL**	**TOR**	**Total**
Chicago	—	4–3–1	3–4–1	2–5–1	5–3	**14–15–3**
Detroit	3–4–1	—	4–4	3–4–1	4–3–1	**14–15–3**
Minnesota	4–3–1	4–4	—	4–4	5–3	**17–14–1**
St. Louis	5–2–1	4–3–1	4–4	—	1–7	**14–16–2**
Toronto	3–5	3–4–1	3–5	7–1	—	**16–15–1**

**Vs. Smythe Division**

1989–90 NHL records
Team	**CGY**	**EDM**	**LAK**	**VAN**	**WIN**	**Total**
Chicago	0–2–1	2–1	2–1	2–1	2–1	**8–6–1**
Detroit	2–1	2–1	1–2	1–1–1	1–1–1	**7–6–2**
Minnesota	1–2	0–3	2–1	1–2	2–1	**6–9–0**
St. Louis	0–2–1	0–2–1	1–2	2–1	1–1–1	**4–8–3**
Toronto	1–2	2–1	2–1	2–1	0–2–1	**7–7–1**

Vs. Wales Conference

**Vs. Adams Division**

1989–90 NHL records
Team	**BOS**	**BUF**	**HFD**	**MTL**	**QUE**	**Total**
Chicago	0–3	2–1	2–1	2–1	2–1	**8–7–0**
Detroit	0–3	1–2	0–2–1	0–1–2	3–0	**4–8–3**
Minnesota	1–2	1–1–1	1–2	1–2	2–1	**6–8–1**
St. Louis	1–2	2–1	2–1	0–1–2	3–0	**8–5–2**
Toronto	1–2	1–2	1–1–1	1–2	3–0	**7–7–1**

**Vs. Patrick Division**

1989–90 NHL records
Team	**NJD**	**NYI**	**NYR**	**PHI**	**PIT**	**WSH**	**Total**
Chicago	1–2	2–1	0–1–2	3–0	3–0	2–1	**11–5–2**
Detroit	1–1–1	1–1–1	0–2–1	1–0–2	0–2–1	0–3	**3–9–6**
Minnesota	2–1	2–1	1–1–1	1–2	1–1–1	0–3	**7–9–2**
St. Louis	1–2	2–1	2–0–1	1–2	3–0	2–0–1	**11–5–2**
Toronto	2–1	0–3	1–1–1	1–2	2–1	2–1	**8–9–1**

== Schedule and results ==
1989–90 regular season
October

Game	Result	Date	Score	Opponent	Record
1	W	October 5, 1989	8–3	@ Chicago Blackhawks (1989–90)	1–0–0
2	L	October 7, 1989	5–8	Toronto Maple Leafs (1989–90)	1–1–0
3	L	October 12, 1989	0–3	@ Minnesota North Stars (1989–90)	1–2–0
4	W	October 14, 1989	2–1	Chicago Blackhawks (1989–90)	2–2–0
5	W	October 18, 1989	9–3	@ Pittsburgh Penguins (1989–90)	3–2–0
6	L	October 19, 1989	3–4	Detroit Red Wings (1989–90)	3–3–0
7	L	October 21, 1989	4–6	Los Angeles Kings (1989–90)	3–4–0
8	L	October 24, 1989	1–6	@ Philadelphia Flyers (1989–90)	3–5–0
9	W	October 26, 1989	4–1	Minnesota North Stars (1989–90)	4–5–0
10	W	October 28, 1989	1–0	Washington Capitals (1989–90)	5–5–0
11	T	October 31, 1989	1–1 OT	@ Washington Capitals (1989–90)	5–5–1

November

Game	Result	Date	Score	Opponent	Record
12	W	November 1, 1989	5–3	@ Hartford Whalers (1989–90)	6–5–1
13	W	November 4, 1989	5–2	@ Quebec Nordiques (1989–90)	7–5–1
14	T	November 6, 1989	3–3 OT	@ Montreal Canadiens (1989–90)	7–5–2
15	T	November 9, 1989	1–1 OT	Montreal Canadiens (1989–90)	7–5–3
16	W	November 11, 1989	8–3	Pittsburgh Penguins (1989–90)	8–5–3
17	L	November 15, 1989	2–5	@ Toronto Maple Leafs (1989–90)	8–6–3
18	W	November 16, 1989	7–2	@ Detroit Red Wings (1989–90)	9–6–3
19	L	November 18, 1989	0–3	@ Minnesota North Stars (1989–90)	9–7–3
20	W	November 21, 1989	7–4	Minnesota North Stars (1989–90)	10–7–3
21	W	November 23, 1989	5–2	@ Winnipeg Jets (1989–90)	11–7–3
22	T	November 25, 1989	3–3 OT	Calgary Flames (1989–90)	11–7–4
23	L	November 28, 1989	1–5	Boston Bruins (1989–90)	11–8–4
24	L	November 30, 1989	3–5	Hartford Whalers (1989–90)	11–9–4

December

Game	Result	Date	Score	Opponent	Record
25	W	December 2, 1989	2–1	@ Boston Bruins (1989–90)	12–9–4
26	L	December 3, 1989	3–4	@ Buffalo Sabres (1989–90)	12–10–4
27	T	December 5, 1989	2–2 OT	@ Detroit Red Wings (1989–90)	12–10–5
28	L	December 7, 1989	2–5	Toronto Maple Leafs (1989–90)	12–11–5
29	W	December 9, 1989	6–4	Vancouver Canucks (1989–90)	13–11–5
30	L	December 11, 1989	1–3	@ Toronto Maple Leafs (1989–90)	13–12–5
31	W	December 13, 1989	3–1	@ New York Rangers (1989–90)	14–12–5
32	T	December 16, 1989	3–3 OT	Edmonton Oilers (1989–90)	14–12–6
33	L	December 18, 1989	3–6	@ Toronto Maple Leafs (1989–90)	14–13–6
34	L	December 20, 1989	6–9	@ Chicago Blackhawks (1989–90)	14–14–6
35	L	December 23, 1989	2–3	@ New Jersey Devils (1989–90)	14–15–6
36	W	December 26, 1989	8–3	Chicago Blackhawks (1989–90)	15–15–6
37	L	December 28, 1989	2–3	@ New York Islanders (1989–90)	15–16–6
38	W	December 30, 1989	3–2	Minnesota North Stars (1989–90)	16–16–6
39	L	December 31, 1989	1–2 OT	@ Minnesota North Stars (1989–90)	16–17–6

January

Game	Result	Date	Score	Opponent	Record
40	L	January 2, 1990	4–6	Edmonton Oilers (1989–90)	16–18–6
41	W	January 4, 1990	5–4 OT	Philadelphia Flyers (1989–90)	17–18–6
42	W	January 6, 1990	4–3	New York Rangers (1989–90)	18–18–6
43	W	January 9, 1990	4–3	@ Los Angeles Kings (1989–90)	19–18–6
44	W	January 12, 1990	5–2	@ Vancouver Canucks (1989–90)	20–18–6
45	L	January 14, 1990	5–6	@ Winnipeg Jets (1989–90)	20–19–6
46	L	January 16, 1990	2–5	Calgary Flames (1989–90)	20–20–6
47	L	January 18, 1990	1–4	Toronto Maple Leafs (1989–90)	20–21–6
48	W	January 23, 1990	6–3	@ Detroit Red Wings (1989–90)	21–21–6
49	W	January 25, 1990	3–2	Hartford Whalers (1989–90)	22–21–6
50	T	January 27, 1990	3–3 OT	Winnipeg Jets (1989–90)	22–21–7
51	W	January 30, 1990	2–1	@ New York Islanders (1989–90)	23–21–7
52	T	January 31, 1990	2–2 OT	@ New York Rangers (1989–90)	23–21–8

February

Game	Result	Date	Score	Opponent	Record
53	W	February 3, 1990	4–2	Detroit Red Wings (1989–90)	24–21–8
54	W	February 6, 1990	6–4	Toronto Maple Leafs (1989–90)	25–21–8
55	L	February 7, 1990	1–7	@ Toronto Maple Leafs (1989–90)	25–22–8
56	W	February 10, 1990	7–0	New Jersey Devils (1989–90)	26–22–8
57	W	February 11, 1990	4–2	Buffalo Sabres (1989–90)	27–22–8
58	W	February 13, 1990	2–1 OT	@ Minnesota North Stars (1989–90)	28–22–8
59	W	February 15, 1990	9–2	Quebec Nordiques (1989–90)	29–22–8
60	W	February 17, 1990	6–1	Detroit Red Wings (1989–90)	30–22–8
61	L	February 20, 1990	3–8	Chicago Blackhawks (1989–90)	30–23–8
62	L	February 22, 1990	4–7	Philadelphia Flyers (1989–90)	30–24–8
63	W	February 24, 1990	6–1	@ Quebec Nordiques (1989–90)	31–24–8
64	L	February 25, 1990	5–6 OT	@ Montreal Canadiens (1989–90)	31–25–8
65	W	February 27, 1990	4–1	Buffalo Sabres (1989–90)	32–25–8

March

Game	Result	Date	Score	Opponent	Record
66	W	March 1, 1990	6–4	@ Chicago Blackhawks (1989–90)	33–25–8
67	W	March 3, 1990	5–4	New York Islanders (1989–90)	34–25–8
68	L	March 6, 1990	1–2	@ New Jersey Devils (1989–90)	34–26–8
69	L	March 8, 1990	2–3	@ Detroit Red Wings (1989–90)	34–27–8
70	T	March 10, 1990	2–2 OT	Chicago Blackhawks (1989–90)	34–27–9
71	W	March 11, 1990	6–4	@ Chicago Blackhawks (1989–90)	35–27–9
72	W	March 13, 1990	4–1	@ Washington Capitals (1989–90)	36–27–9
73	L	March 15, 1990	5–6 OT	Vancouver Canucks (1989–90)	36–28–9
74	L	March 17, 1990	3–4 OT	Detroit Red Wings (1989–90)	36–29–9
75	L	March 19, 1990	2–5	@ Calgary Flames (1989–90)	36–30–9
76	L	March 21, 1990	6–8	@ Edmonton Oilers (1989–90)	36–31–9
77	L	March 24, 1990	3–9	@ Los Angeles Kings (1989–90)	36–32–9
78	L	March 27, 1990	0–3	Boston Bruins (1989–90)	36–33–9
79	W	March 29, 1990	5–4	Pittsburgh Penguins (1989–90)	37–33–9
80	L	March 31, 1990	3–6	Minnesota North Stars (1989–90)	37–34–9

Legend: Win (2 points) Loss (0 points) Tie (1 point)

== Player statistics ==
=== Regular season ===
Scoring

Player	Pos	GP	G	A	Pts	PIM	+/-	PPG	SHG	GWG
Brett Hull	RW	80	72	41	113	24	-1	27	0	12
Adam Oates	C	80	23	79	102	30	9	6	2	3
Peter Zezel	C	73	25	47	72	30	-9	7	0	3
Paul MacLean	RW	78	34	33	67	100	2	12	0	6
Rod Brind'Amour	C	79	26	35	61	46	23	10	0	1
Sergio Momesso	LW	79	24	32	56	199	-15	4	0	4
Paul Cavallini	D	80	8	39	47	106	38	2	1	0
Jeff Brown	D	48	10	28	38	37	-12	6	1	0
Gino Cavallini	LW	80	15	15	30	77	-8	1	0	4
Dave Lowry	LW	78	19	6	25	75	1	0	2	1
Rick Meagher	C	76	8	17	25	47	4	0	2	1
Steve Tuttle	RW	71	12	10	22	4	-6	1	1	1
Ron Wilson	C	33	3	17	20	23	5	1	0	1
Tony Hrkac	C	28	5	12	17	8	1	1	0	0
Gordie Roberts	D	75	3	14	17	140	-12	0	0	0
Mike Lalor	D	78	0	16	16	81	-6	0	0	0
Glen Featherstone	D	58	0	12	12	145	-1	0	0	0
Michel Mongeau	C	7	1	5	6	2	4	0	0	0
Randy Skarda	D	25	0	5	5	11	2	0	0	0
Tom Tilley	D	34	0	5	5	6	10	0	0	0
Kelly Chase	RW	43	1	3	4	244	-1	0	0	0
Dave Thomlinson	LW	19	1	2	3	12	-4	0	0	0
Rich Sutter	RW	12	2	0	2	22	-2	0	0	0
Brian Benning	D	7	1	1	2	2	-3	0	0	0
Robert Dirk	D	37	1	1	2	128	9	0	0	0
Dominic Lavoie	D	13	1	1	2	16	-5	1	0	0
Keith Osborne	RW	5	0	2	2	8	-2	0	0	0
Curtis Joseph	G	15	0	1	1	0	0	0	0	0
Adrien Plavsic	D	4	0	1	1	2	3	0	0	0
Herb Raglan	RW	11	0	1	1	21	-5	0	0	0
Harold Snepsts	D	7	0	1	1	10	-4	0	0	0
Jim Vesey	C/RW	6	0	1	1	0	-3	0	0	0
Doug Evans	LW	3	0	0	0	0	0	0	0	0
Todd Ewen	RW	3	0	0	0	11	-2	0	0	0
Pat Jablonski	G	4	0	0	0	0	0	0	0	0
Greg Millen	G	21	0	0	0	0	0	0	0	0
Dave Richter	D	2	0	0	0	0	-2	0	0	0
Vincent Riendeau	G	43	0	0	0	6	0	0	0	0
Tony Twist	LW	28	0	0	0	124	-2	0	0	0

Goaltending

Player	MIN	GP	W	L	T	GA	GAA	SO	SA	SV	SV%
Vincent Riendeau	2551	43	17	19	5	149	3.50	1	1271	1122	.883
Greg Millen	1245	21	11	7	3	61	2.94	1	556	495	.890
Curtis Joseph	852	15	9	5	1	48	3.38	0	435	387	.890
Pat Jablonski	208	4	0	3	0	17	4.90	0	98	81	.827
Team:	4856	80	37	34	9	275	3.40	2	2360	2085	.883

=== Playoffs ===
Scoring

Player	Pos	GP	G	A	Pts	PIM	+/-	PPG	SHG	GWG
Brett Hull	RW	12	13	8	21	17	1	7	0	3
Adam Oates	C	12	2	12	14	4	-10	1	0	0
Rod Brind'Amour	C	12	5	8	13	6	0	1	0	0
Jeff Brown	D	12	2	10	12	4	-6	1	0	1
Ron Wilson	C	12	3	5	8	18	1	2	0	0
Peter Zezel	C	12	1	7	8	4	3	1	0	0
Paul MacLean	RW	12	4	3	7	20	-5	3	0	0
Sergio Momesso	LW	12	3	2	5	63	3	0	0	1
Paul Cavallini	D	12	2	3	5	20	4	0	0	0
Gino Cavallini	LW	12	1	3	4	12	-4	0	0	1
Dave Lowry	LW	12	2	1	3	39	-7	0	0	0
Rich Sutter	RW	12	2	1	3	39	-3	0	1	1
Harold Snepsts	D	11	0	3	3	38	-4	0	0	0
Glen Featherstone	D	12	0	2	2	47	-4	0	0	0
Mike Lalor	D	12	0	2	2	31	-3	0	0	0
Gordie Roberts	D	10	0	2	2	26	6	0	0	0
Kelly Chase	RW	9	1	0	1	46	-1	0	0	0
Rick Meagher	C	8	1	0	1	2	-2	0	0	0
Michel Mongeau	C	2	0	1	1	0	-1	0	0	0
Steve Tuttle	RW	5	0	1	1	2	-1	0	0	0
Robert Dirk	D	3	0	0	0	0	-1	0	0	0
Curtis Joseph	G	6	0	0	0	2	0	0	0	0
Vincent Riendeau	G	8	0	0	0	0	0	0	0	0

Goaltending

Player	MIN	GP	W	L	GA	GAA	SO	SA	SV	SV%
Curtis Joseph	327	6	4	1	18	3.30	0	167	149	.892
Vincent Riendeau	397	8	3	4	24	3.63	0	223	199	.892
Team:	724	12	7	5	42	3.48	0	390	348	.892

Note:

Pos = Position;GP = Games played; G = Goals; A = Assists; Pts = Points; PIM = Penalty minutes; +/- = Plus/minus; PPG = Power-play goals; SHG = Short-handed goals; GWG = Game-winning goals
Pos = Position;GP = Games played; Min, TOI = Minutes played; W = Wins; L = Losses; T,T/OT = Ties; OTL = Overtime losses; GA = Goals-against; GAA = Goals-against average; SO = Shutouts; SA = Shots against; SV = Shots saved;SV% = Save percentage;

== Awards and records ==
- Frank J. Selke Trophy: || Rick Meagher
- Lady Byng Memorial Trophy: || Brett Hull
- NHL Plus/Minus Award: || Paul Cavallini, St. Louis Blues
- Brett Hull, Right Wing, NHL First Team All-Star
- Brett Hull, NHL goals leader, with 72

== Draft picks ==
St. Louis's draft picks at the 1989 NHL entry draft held at the Met Center in Bloomington, Minnesota.

Round	#	Player	Nationality	College/Junior/Club team (League)
1	9	Jason Marshall	Canada	Vernon Lakers (BCJHL)
2	31	Rick Corriveau	Canada	London Knights (OHL)
3	55	Denny Felsner	United States	University of Michigan (CCHA)
5	93	Daniel Laperriere	Canada	St. Lawrence University (ECAC)
6	114	David Roberts	United States	Avon Old Farms (USHS-CT)
6	124	Derek Frenette	Canada	Ferris State University (CCHA)
7	135	Jeff Batters	Canada	University of Alaska Anchorage (NCAA Independent)
8	156	Kevin Plager	United States	Parkway North High School (USHS-MO)
9	177	John Roderick	United States	Cambridge Rindge and Latin School (USHS-MA)
10	198	John Valo	United States	Detroit Compuware Ambassadors (NAHL)
11	219	Brian Lukowski	United States	Niagara Falls Canucks (GHJHL)
S	14	Rob Tustian	United States	Michigan Technological University (WCHA)
