= 1989–90 Detroit Red Wings season =

Sports season

1989–90 Detroit Red Wings
- Division: 5th Norris
- Conference: 9th Campbell
- 1989–90 record: 28–38–14
- Home record: 20–14–6
- Road record: 8–24–8
- Goals for: 288
- Goals against: 317

Team information
- General manager: Jim Devellano
- Coach: Jacques Demers
- Captain: Steve Yzerman
- Alternate captains: Gerard Gallant; Mike O'Connell
- Arena: Joe Louis Arena

Team leaders
- Goals: Steve Yzerman (62)
- Assists: Steve Yzerman (65)
- Points: Steve Yzerman (127)
- Penalty minutes: Joe Kocur (268)
- Plus/minus: Borje Salming (20)
- Wins: Glen Hanlon (15)
- Goals against average: Sam St. Laurent (3.76)

The 1989–90 Detroit Red Wings season was the Red Wings' 58th season, the franchise's 64th. The season involved drafting Sergei Fedorov and Nicklas Lidstrom the team missed the playoffs for the first time since the 1985–86 season. Until the 2016–17 season, this was the last season that the Red Wings failed to make the playoffs.

== Offseason ==
=== NHL draft ===
Round	#	Player	Position	Nationality
1	11	Mike Sillinger	Center	Canada
2	32	Bob Boughner	Defense	Canada
3	53	Nicklas Lidstrom	Defense	Sweden
4	74	Sergei Fedorov	Center	Soviet Union
5	95	Shawn McCosh	Center	Canada
6	116	Dallas Drake	Right wing	Canada
7	137	Scott Zygulski	Defense	United States
8	158	Andy Suhy	Defense	United States
9	179	Bob Jones	Left wing	Canada
10	200	Greg Bignell	Defense	Canada
10	204	Rick Judson	Left wing	United States
11	221	Vladimir Konstantinov	Defense	Soviet Union
12	242	Joe Frederick	Right wing	United States
12	246	Jason Glickman	Goaltender	United States
S	16	Brad Kreick	Defense	Canada

== Regular season ==
=== Final standings ===
Norris Division
	GP	W	L	T	GF	GA	Pts
**Chicago Blackhawks**	80	41	33	6	315	294	88
**St. Louis Blues**	80	37	34	9	295	279	83
**Toronto Maple Leafs**	80	38	38	4	337	358	80
**Minnesota North Stars**	80	36	40	4	284	291	76
Detroit Red Wings	80	28	38	14	288	323	70

Note: GP = Games played, W = Wins, L = Losses, T = Ties, Pts = Points, GF = Goals for, GA = Goals against
Note: Teams that qualified for the playoffs are highlighted in bold.

Campbell Conference
R		Div	GP	W	L	T	GF	GA	Pts
**1**	**Calgary Flames**	**SMY**	**80**	**42**	**23**	**15**	**348**	**265**	**99**
**2**	**Edmonton Oilers**	**SMY**	**80**	**38**	**28**	**14**	**315**	**283**	**90**
**3**	**Chicago Blackhawks**	**NRS**	**80**	**41**	**33**	**6**	**316**	**294**	**88**
**4**	**Winnipeg Jets**	**SMY**	**80**	**37**	**32**	**11**	**298**	**290**	**85**
**5**	**St. Louis Blues**	**NRS**	**80**	**37**	**34**	**9**	**295**	**279**	**83**
**6**	**Toronto Maple Leafs**	**NRS**	**80**	**38**	**38**	**4**	**337**	**358**	**80**
**7**	**Minnesota North Stars**	**NRS**	**80**	**36**	**40**	**4**	**284**	**291**	**76**
**8**	**Los Angeles Kings**	**SMY**	**80**	**34**	**39**	**7**	**338**	**337**	**75**
9	Detroit Red Wings	NRS	80	28	38	14	288	323	70
10	Vancouver Canucks	SMY	80	25	41	14	245	306	64

Divisions: NRS – Norris, SMY – Smythe

bold – Qualified for playoffs

=== Record vs. opponents ===
==== Vs. Campbell Conference ====
**Vs. Norris Division**

1989–90 NHL records
Team	**CHI**	**DET**	**MIN**	**STL**	**TOR**	**Total**
Chicago	—	4–3–1	3–4–1	2–5–1	5–3	**14–15–3**
Detroit	3–4–1	—	4–4	3–4–1	4–3–1	**14–15–3**
Minnesota	4–3–1	4–4	—	4–4	5–3	**17–14–1**
St. Louis	5–2–1	4–3–1	4–4	—	1–7	**14–16–2**
Toronto	3–5	3–4–1	3–5	7–1	—	**16–15–1**

**Vs. Smythe Division**

1989–90 NHL records
Team	**CGY**	**EDM**	**LAK**	**VAN**	**WIN**	**Total**
Chicago	0–2–1	2–1	2–1	2–1	2–1	**8–6–1**
Detroit	2–1	2–1	1–2	1–1–1	1–1–1	**7–6–2**
Minnesota	1–2	0–3	2–1	1–2	2–1	**6–9–0**
St. Louis	0–2–1	0–2–1	1–2	2–1	1–1–1	**4–8–3**
Toronto	1–2	2–1	2–1	2–1	0–2–1	**7–7–1**

Vs. Wales Conference

**Vs. Adams Division**

1989–90 NHL records
Team	**BOS**	**BUF**	**HFD**	**MTL**	**QUE**	**Total**
Chicago	0–3	2–1	2–1	2–1	2–1	**8–7–0**
Detroit	0–3	1–2	0–2–1	0–1–2	3–0	**4–8–3**
Minnesota	1–2	1–1–1	1–2	1–2	2–1	**6–8–1**
St. Louis	1–2	2–1	2–1	0–1–2	3–0	**8–5–2**
Toronto	1–2	1–2	1–1–1	1–2	3–0	**7–7–1**

**Vs. Patrick Division**

1989–90 NHL records
Team	**NJD**	**NYI**	**NYR**	**PHI**	**PIT**	**WSH**	**Total**
Chicago	1–2	2–1	0–1–2	3–0	3–0	2–1	**11–5–2**
Detroit	1–1–1	1–1–1	0–2–1	1–0–2	0–2–1	0–3	**3–9–6**
Minnesota	2–1	2–1	1–1–1	1–2	1–1–1	0–3	**7–9–2**
St. Louis	1–2	2–1	2–0–1	1–2	3–0	2–0–1	**11–5–2**
Toronto	2–1	0–3	1–1–1	1–2	2–1	2–1	**8–9–1**

== Schedule and results ==
1989–90 regular season
October

Game	Result	Date	Score	Opponent	Record
1	L	October 5, 1989	7–10	@ Calgary Flames (1989–90)	0–1–0
2	L	October 7, 1989	3–5	@ Vancouver Canucks (1989–90)	0–2–0
3	L	October 8, 1989	0–5	@ Los Angeles Kings (1989–90)	0–3–0
4	W	October 12, 1989	5–4	Winnipeg Jets (1989–90)	1–3–0
5	W	October 14, 1989	6–2	Buffalo Sabres (1989–90)	2–3–0
6	L	October 15, 1989	0–3	@ Chicago Blackhawks (1989–90)	2–4–0
7	W	October 18, 1989	4–3	Minnesota North Stars (1989–90)	3–4–0
8	W	October 19, 1989	4–3	@ St. Louis Blues (1989–90)	4–4–0
9	T	October 21, 1989	3–3 OT	@ Hartford Whalers (1989–90)	4–4–1
10	L	October 24, 1989	3–5	Chicago Blackhawks (1989–90)	4–5–1
11	T	October 26, 1989	3–3 OT	Pittsburgh Penguins (1989–90)	4–5–2
12	L	October 28, 1989	4–6	@ Toronto Maple Leafs (1989–90)	4–6–2

November

Game	Result	Date	Score	Opponent	Record
13	T	November 1, 1989	5–5 OT	Philadelphia Flyers (1989–90)	4–6–3
14	L	November 3, 1989	3–4	Hartford Whalers (1989–90)	4–7–3
15	L	November 4, 1989	2–3	@ New York Islanders (1989–90)	4–8–3
16	L	November 6, 1989	1–6	@ New York Rangers (1989–90)	4–9–3
17	L	November 9, 1989	1–5	@ Minnesota North Stars (1989–90)	4–10–3
18	L	November 11, 1989	2–4	@ Toronto Maple Leafs (1989–90)	4–11–3
19	L	November 14, 1989	0–3	Hartford Whalers (1989–90)	4–12–3
20	L	November 16, 1989	2–7	St. Louis Blues (1989–90)	4–13–3
21	W	November 18, 1989	8–1	@ Quebec Nordiques (1989–90)	5–13–3
22	L	November 21, 1989	1–2 OT	Boston Bruins (1989–90)	5–14–3
23	W	November 24, 1989	3–2	Calgary Flames (1989–90)	6–14–3
24	L	November 27, 1989	2–6	Edmonton Oilers (1989–90)	6–15–3
25	L	November 29, 1989	3–5	Washington Capitals (1989–90)	6–16–3

December

Game	Result	Date	Score	Opponent	Record
26	T	December 1, 1989	3–3 OT	@ Winnipeg Jets (1989–90)	6–16–4
27	W	December 3, 1989	4–3	@ Chicago Blackhawks (1989–90)	7–16–4
28	T	December 5, 1989	2–2 OT	St. Louis Blues (1989–90)	7–16–5
29	W	December 8, 1989	2–1	Minnesota North Stars (1989–90)	8–16–5
30	W	December 9, 1989	3–1	@ Minnesota North Stars (1989–90)	9–16–5
31	L	December 13, 1989	2–4	Toronto Maple Leafs (1989–90)	9–17–5
32	W	December 15, 1989	8–4	Chicago Blackhawks (1989–90)	10–17–5
33	L	December 16, 1989	1–3	@ Montreal Canadiens (1989–90)	10–18–5
34	W	December 20, 1989	4–2	Toronto Maple Leafs (1989–90)	11–18–5
35	L	December 23, 1989	5–6	@ Boston Bruins (1989–90)	11–19–5
36	L	December 26, 1989	3–6	@ Buffalo Sabres (1989–90)	11–20–5
37	T	December 27, 1989	7–7 OT	@ Toronto Maple Leafs (1989–90)	11–20–6
38	L	December 29, 1989	1–2	@ Washington Capitals (1989–90)	11–21–6
39	W	December 31, 1989	6–4	New Jersey Devils (1989–90)	12–21–6

January

Game	Result	Date	Score	Opponent	Record
40	W	January 2, 1990	4–1	Vancouver Canucks (1989–90)	13–21–6
41	W	January 4, 1990	4–1	Quebec Nordiques (1989–90)	14–21–6
42	L	January 6, 1990	3–4	@ Minnesota North Stars (1989–90)	14–22–6
43	W	January 9, 1990	9–0	Minnesota North Stars (1989–90)	15–22–6
44	L	January 12, 1990	5–7	@ Winnipeg Jets (1989–90)	15–23–6
45	L	January 13, 1990	4–6	@ Minnesota North Stars (1989–90)	15–24–6
46	W	January 16, 1990	6–4	@ Edmonton Oilers (1989–90)	16–24–6
47	L	January 18, 1990	4–9	@ Los Angeles Kings (1989–90)	16–25–6
48	L	January 23, 1990	3–6	St. Louis Blues (1989–90)	16–26–6
49	L	January 25, 1990	3–5	Pittsburgh Penguins (1989–90)	16–27–6
50	W	January 27, 1990	8–6	@ Quebec Nordiques (1989–90)	17–27–6
51	W	January 31, 1990	7–5	Edmonton Oilers (1989–90)	18–27–6

February

Game	Result	Date	Score	Opponent	Record
52	W	February 2, 1990	5–2	Toronto Maple Leafs (1989–90)	19–27–6
53	L	February 3, 1990	2–4	@ St. Louis Blues (1989–90)	19–28–6
54	L	February 6, 1990	0–2	Boston Bruins (1989–90)	19–29–6
55	L	February 8, 1990	6–8	Chicago Blackhawks (1989–90)	19–30–6
56	W	February 10, 1990	7–5	Calgary Flames (1989–90)	20–30–6
57	T	February 12, 1990	1–1 OT	@ New Jersey Devils (1989–90)	20–30–7
58	W	February 14, 1990	6–5	Los Angeles Kings (1989–90)	21–30–7
59	W	February 16, 1990	9–6	Philadelphia Flyers (1989–90)	22–30–7
60	L	February 17, 1990	1–6	@ St. Louis Blues (1989–90)	22–31–7
61	T	February 19, 1990	5–5 OT	Montreal Canadiens (1989–90)	22–31–8
62	T	February 21, 1990	4–4 OT	New York Rangers (1989–90)	22–31–9
63	T	February 24, 1990	3–3 OT	@ New York Islanders (1989–90)	22–31–10
64	L	February 25, 1990	4–9	@ Washington Capitals (1989–90)	22–32–10
65	W	February 28, 1990	4–3	New York Islanders (1989–90)	23–32–10

March

Game	Result	Date	Score	Opponent	Record
66	W	March 2, 1990	3–2 OT	Toronto Maple Leafs (1989–90)	24–32–10
67	W	March 3, 1990	5–2	@ Toronto Maple Leafs (1989–90)	25–32–10
68	L	March 5, 1990	2–3	@ New York Rangers (1989–90)	25–33–10
69	W	March 8, 1990	3–2	St. Louis Blues (1989–90)	26–33–10
70	T	March 10, 1990	3–3 OT	@ Montreal Canadiens (1989–90)	26–33–11
71	T	March 13, 1990	3–3 OT	@ Chicago Blackhawks (1989–90)	26–33–12
72	L	March 15, 1990	1–6	@ Pittsburgh Penguins (1989–90)	26–34–12
73	W	March 17, 1990	4–3 OT	@ St. Louis Blues (1989–90)	27–34–12
74	T	March 20, 1990	4–4 OT	Vancouver Canucks (1989–90)	27–34–13
75	L	March 22, 1990	1–5	Minnesota North Stars (1989–90)	27–35–13
76	W	March 24, 1990	5–3	Chicago Blackhawks (1989–90)	28–35–13
77	L	March 25, 1990	2–3	@ Chicago Blackhawks (1989–90)	28–36–13
78	L	March 27, 1990	5–6	Buffalo Sabres (1989–90)	28–37–13
79	L	March 31, 1990	1–5	@ New Jersey Devils (1989–90)	28–38–13

April

Game	Result	Date	Score	Opponent	Record
80	T	April 1, 1990	3–3 OT	@ Philadelphia Flyers (1989–90)	28–38–14

Legend: Win (2 points) Loss (0 points) Tie (1 point)

== Player statistics ==
=== Forwards ===
Note: GP = Games played; G = Goals; A = Assists; Pts = Points; PIM = Penalty minutes

Player	GP	G	A	Pts	PIM
Steve Yzerman	79	62	65	127	79
Gerard Gallant	69	36	44	80	254
Bernie Federko	73	17	40	57	24
Shawn Burr	76	24	32	56	82
John Chabot	69	9	40	49	24
Jimmy Carson	44	20	16	36	8
Joey Kocur	71	16	20	36	268
Dave Barr	62	10	25	35	45
Marc Habscheid	66	15	11	26	33
Daniel Shank	57	11	13	24	143
Petr Klima	13	5	5	10	6
Greg Adams	28	3	7	10	16
Kevin McClelland	61	4	5	9	183
Randy McKay	33	3	6	9	51
Sheldon Kennedy	20	2	7	9	10
Torrie Robertson	42	1	5	6	112
Brent Fedyk	27	1	4	5	6
Joe Murphy	9	3	1	4	4
Bob Probert	4	3	0	3	21
Tony McKegney	14	2	1	3	8
Jim Nill	15	0	2	2	18
Chris McRae	7	1	0	1	45
Adam Graves	13	0	1	1	13
Murray Eaves	1	0	0	0	0
Glenn Merkosky	3	0	0	0	0

=== Defensemen ===
Note: GP = Games played; G = Goals; A = Assists; Pts = Points; PIM = Penalty minutes

Player	GP	G	A	Pts	PIM
Steve Chiasson	67	14	28	42	114
Rick Zombo	77	5	20	25	95
Lee Norwood	64	8	14	22	95
Borje Salming	49	2	17	19	52
Mike O'Connell	66	4	14	18	22
Yves Racine	28	4	9	13	23
Doug Houda	73	2	9	11	127
Robert Picard	20	0	3	3	20
Dean Morton	1	1	0	1	2
John Mokosak	33	0	1	1	82
Peter Dineen	2	0	0	0	5
Chris Kotsopoulos	2	0	0	0	10

=== Goaltending ===
Note: GP = Games played; MIN = Minutes; W = Wins; L = Losses; T = Ties; SO = Shutouts; GAA = Goals against average

Player	GP	MIN	W	L	T	SO	GAA
Tim Cheveldae	28	1600	10	9	8	0	3.79
Glen Hanlon	45	2290	15	18	5	1	4.03
Sam St. Laurent	14	607	2	6	1	0	3.76
Greg Stefan	7	359	1	5	0	0	4.01

==== Scoring by goalies ====
Note: GP = Games played; G = Goals; A = Assists; Pts = Points; PIM = Points

Player	GP	G	A	Pts	PIM
Glen Hanlon	45	0	3	3	24
Greg Stefan	7	0	1	1	4
Tim Cheveldae	28	0	1	1	2
