= James Black (ice hockey) =

Canadian ice hockey player

- Born: August 15, 1969 (age 56) Regina, Saskatchewan, Canada
- Height: 6 ft 0 in (183 cm)
- Weight: 185 lb (84 kg; 13 st 3 lb)
- Position: Centre
- Shot: Left
- Played for: Hartford Whalers; Minnesota North Stars; Dallas Stars; Buffalo Sabres; Chicago Blackhawks; Washington Capitals
- NHL draft: 94th overall, 1989; Hartford Whalers
- Playing career: 1989–2005

James Black (born August 15, 1969) is a Canadian former professional ice hockey forward who played eleven seasons in the National Hockey League with the Hartford Whalers, Minnesota North Stars/Dallas Stars, Buffalo Sabres, Chicago Blackhawks and Washington Capitals from 1989–90 to 2000–01.

== Career ==
Black was drafted 94th overall by the Hartford Whalers in the 1989 NHL entry draft. He played 352 career NHL games, scoring 58 goals and 57 assists for 115 points. His best offensive season was the 1998–99 NHL season when he achieved career highs in goals with sixteen, assists with fourteen, and points with thirty.

== Career statistics ==
			Regular season					Playoffs
Season	Team	League	GP	G	A	Pts	PIM	GP	G	A	Pts	PIM
1986–87	Edmonton Knights of Columbus	AMHL	41	36	48	84	58	—	—	—	—	—
1987–88	Portland Winter Hawks	WHL	72	30	50	80	50	—	—	—	—	—
1988–89	Portland Winter Hawks	WHL	71	45	51	96	57	19	13	6	19	28
1989–90	Hartford Whalers	NHL	1	0	0	0	0	—	—	—	—	—
1989–90	Binghamton Whalers	AHL	80	37	35	72	34	—	—	—	—	—
1990–91	Hartford Whalers	NHL	1	0	0	0	0	—	—	—	—	—
1990–91	Springfield Indians	AHL	79	35	61	96	34	18	9	9	18	6
1991–92	Hartford Whalers	NHL	30	4	6	10	10	—	—	—	—	—
1991–92	Springfield Indians	AHL	47	15	25	40	33	10	3	2	5	18
1992–93	Minnesota North Stars	NHL	10	2	1	3	4	—	—	—	—	—
1992–93	Kalamazoo Wings	AHL	63	25	45	70	40	—	—	—	—	—
1993–94	Dallas Stars	NHL	13	2	3	5	2	—	—	—	—	—
1993–94	Buffalo Sabres	NHL	2	0	0	0	0	—	—	—	—	—
1993–94	Rochester Americans	AHL	45	19	32	51	28	4	2	3	5	0
1994–95	Las Vegas Thunder	IHL	78	29	44	73	54	10	1	6	7	4
1995–96	Chicago Blackhawks	NHL	13	3	3	6	16	8	1	0	1	2
1995–96	Indianapolis Ice	IHL	67	32	50	82	56	—	—	—	—	—
1996–97	Chicago Blackhawks	NHL	64	12	11	23	20	5	1	1	2	2
1997–98	Chicago Blackhawks	NHL	52	10	5	15	8	—	—	—	—	—
1998–99	Washington Capitals	NHL	75	16	14	30	14	—	—	—	—	—
1998–99	Chicago Wolves	IHL	5	6	0	6	0	—	—	—	—	—
1999–00	Washington Capitals	NHL	49	8	9	17	6	—	—	—	—	—
2000–01	Washington Capitals	NHL	42	1	5	6	4	—	—	—	—	—
2000–01	Portland Pirates	AHL	5	2	3	5	0	—	—	—	—	—
2001–02	Grand Rapids Griffins	AHL	29	6	10	16	10	—	—	—	—	—
2002–03	EV Zug	NLA	18	6	8	14	4	—	—	—	—	—
2003–04	Iserlohn Roosters	DEL	50	17	27	44	44	—	—	—	—	—
2004–05	HC Bolzano	Italy	6	2	3	5	2	10	4	2	6	8
NHL totals			352	58	57	115	84	13	2	1	3	4
AHL totals			285	114	166	280	139	32	14	14	28	24
IHL totals			213	92	139	231	150	10	1	6	7	4
DEL totals			50	17	27	44	44	—	—	—	—	—
NLA totals			18	6	8	14	4	—	—	—	—	—
