= 1989–90 Calgary Flames season =

NHL team season

1989–90 Calgary Flames
- Smythe Division champions
- Division: 1st Smythe
- Conference: 1st Campbell
- 1989–90 record: 42–23–15
- Home record: 28–7–5
- Road record: 14–16–10
- Goals for: 348
- Goals against: 265

Team information
- General manager: Cliff Fletcher
- Coach: Terry Crisp
- Captain: Jim Peplinski (Oct); Brad McCrimmon (Oct-Apr)
- Alternate captains: Doug Gilmour; Tim Hunter
- Arena: Olympic Saddledome
- Average attendance: 19,861

Team leaders
- Goals: Joe Nieuwendyk (45)
- Assists: Doug Gilmour (67)
- Points: Joe Nieuwendyk (95)
- Penalty minutes: Tim Hunter (279)
- Wins: Mike Vernon (23)
- Goals against average: Mike Vernon (3.13)

Calgary Flames 10th anniversary logo patch

The 1989–90 Calgary Flames season was the Flames' eighteenth season, and their tenth in Calgary. In defense of their first Stanley Cup championship, despite losing both Lanny McDonald and Jim Peplinski to retirement, the Flames remained a dominant team on the ice, finishing atop the Smythe Division and the Campbell Conference for the third consecutive year, and 2nd overall in the NHL with 99 points – two points behind the Boston Bruins.

The regular season success did not translate in the postseason, however, as the Flames were stunned by the Los Angeles Kings in six games in the first round of the playoffs. The loss began 15 years of playoff frustration, as the Flames would not win another postseason round until the 2003–04 season.

Following the loss, the Flames fired head coach Terry Crisp, later replacing him with Doug Risebrough. In three seasons with the Flames, Crisp compiled a 144–63–33 record, with one Stanley Cup win and two Presidents' Trophies.

Individually, Russian superstar Sergei Makarov, who was drafted by the Flames in 1983, was allowed to leave the Soviet Union and play in the NHL. Makarov finished 4th in team scoring with 86 points. The 32-year-old Makarov captured the Calder Memorial Trophy as the NHL's rookie of the year. The selection was controversial, as Makarov had played 11 pro seasons in the Soviet Union prior to joining the Flames. As a result, the league changed the rules for the following seasons, stating that only players under the age of 26 would be eligible for the award.

Four Flames were named to represent the Campbell Conference at the 1990 All-Star Game: Forwards Joe Mullen and Joe Nieuwendyk, defenceman Al MacInnis and goaltender Mike Vernon.

== Regular season ==
The Flames finished first in scoring, with 348 goals for, and first in power-play percentage, with 27.73% (99 for 357).

=== Season standings ===
Smythe Division
	GP	W	L	T	GF	GA	Pts
**Calgary Flames**	80	42	23	15	348	265	99
**Edmonton Oilers**	80	38	28	14	315	283	90
**Winnipeg Jets**	80	37	32	11	298	290	85
**Los Angeles Kings**	80	34	39	7	338	337	75
Vancouver Canucks	80	25	41	14	245	306	64

Note: GP = Games played, W = Wins, L = Losses, T = Ties, Pts = Points, GF = Goals for, GA = Goals against
Note: Teams that qualified for the playoffs are highlighted in bold.

Campbell Conference
R		Div	GP	W	L	T	GF	GA	Pts
**1**	**Calgary Flames**	**SMY**	**80**	**42**	**23**	**15**	**348**	**265**	**99**
**2**	**Edmonton Oilers**	**SMY**	**80**	**38**	**28**	**14**	**315**	**283**	**90**
**3**	**Chicago Blackhawks**	**NRS**	**80**	**41**	**33**	**6**	**316**	**294**	**88**
**4**	**Winnipeg Jets**	**SMY**	**80**	**37**	**32**	**11**	**298**	**290**	**85**
**5**	**St. Louis Blues**	**NRS**	**80**	**37**	**34**	**9**	**295**	**279**	**83**
**6**	**Toronto Maple Leafs**	**NRS**	**80**	**38**	**38**	**4**	**337**	**358**	**80**
**7**	**Minnesota North Stars**	**NRS**	**80**	**36**	**40**	**4**	**284**	**291**	**76**
**8**	**Los Angeles Kings**	**SMY**	**80**	**34**	**39**	**7**	**338**	**337**	**75**
9	Detroit Red Wings	NRS	80	28	38	14	288	323	70
10	Vancouver Canucks	SMY	80	25	41	14	245	306	64

Divisions: NRS – Norris, SMY – Smythe

bold – Qualified for playoffs

=== Record vs. opponents ===
==== Vs. Campbell Conference ====
Vs. Smythe Division

1989–90 NHL records
Team	CGY	EDM	LAK	VAN	WIN	Total
Calgary	—	4–3–1	4–3–1	5–1–2	3–5	**16–12–4**
Edmonton	3–4–1	—	4–2–2	6–1–1	5–3	**18–10–4**
Los Angeles	3–4–1	2–4–2	—	4–2–2	2–5–1	**11–15–6**
Vancouver	1–5–2	1–6–1	2–4–2	—	2–3–3	**6–18–8**
Winnipeg	5–3	3–5	5–2–1	3–3–2	—	**16–13–3**

Vs. Norris Division

1989–90 NHL records
Team	CHI	DET	MIN	STL	TOR	Total
Calgary	2–0–1	1–2	2–1	2–0–1	2–1	**9–4–2**
Edmonton	1–2	1–2	3–0	2–0–1	1–2	**8–6–1**
Los Angeles	1–2	2–1	1–2	2–1	1–2	**7–8–0**
Vancouver	1–2	1–1–1	2–1	1–2	1–2	**6–8–1**
Winnipeg	1–2	1–1–1	1–2	1–1–1	2–0–1	**6–6–3**

Vs. Wales Conference

Vs. Adams Division

1989–90 NHL records
Team	BOS	BUF	HFD	MTL	QUE	Total
Calgary	1–1–1	1–1–1	2–0–1	1–2	1–0–2	**6–4–5**
Edmonton	0–2–1	2–1	0–1–2	1–1–1	3–0	**6–5–4**
Los Angeles	1–2	1–2	1–2	1–1–1	3–0	**7–7–1**
Vancouver	2–1	0–2–1	1–2	1–2	0–2–1	**4–9–2**
Winnipeg	1–1–1	0–3	2–1	1–1–1	2–1	**6–7–2**

Vs. Patrick Division

1989–90 NHL records
Team	NJD	NYI	NYR	PHI	PIT	WSH	Total
Calgary	3–0	3–0	2–1	1–1–1	2–0–1	0–1–2	**11–3–4**
Edmonton	0–1–2	1–0–2	0–2–1	2–1	1–2	2–1	**6–7–5**
Los Angeles	1–2	1–2	2–1	0–3	2–1	3–0	**9–9–0**
Vancouver	3–0	1–2	0–3	1–0–2	2–1	2–0–1	**9–6–3**
Winnipeg	2–1	1–2	1–1–1	2–1	0–2–1	3–0	**9–7–2**

== Schedule and results ==
1989–90 regular season
October: 6–3–4 (home: 3–0–2; road: 3–3–2)

#	Date	Visitor	Score	Home	OT	Record	Points
1	October 5	Detroit	7 – 10	Calgary		1–0–0	2
2	October 7	NY Islanders	3 – 6	Calgary		2–0–0	4
3	October 10	Calgary	4 – 2	New Jersey		3–0–0	6
4	October 11	Calgary	4 – 5	NY Rangers		3–1–0	6
5	October 14	Calgary	4 – 4	Washington	OT	3–1–1	7
6	October 15	Calgary	3 – 2	Philadelphia		4–1–1	9
7	October 17	Calgary	8 – 8	Quebec	OT	4–1–2	10
8	October 18	Calgary	1 – 2	Montreal		4–2–2	10
9	October 21	Boston	2 – 5	Calgary		5–2–2	12
10	October 23	Washington	3 – 3	Calgary	OT	5–2–3	13
11	October 25	Calgary	5 – 0	Los Angeles		6–2–3	15
12	October 27	Vancouver	5 – 5	Calgary	OT	6–2–4	16
13	October 28	Calgary	3 – 4	Vancouver		6–3–4	16

November: 5–6–4 (home: 4–1–2; road: 1–5–2)

#	Date	Visitor	Score	Home	OT	Record	Points
14	November 1	Winnipeg	3 – 5	Calgary		7–3–4	18
15	November 3	Calgary	2 – 5	Edmonton		7–4–4	18
16	November 4	New Jersey	3 – 7	Calgary		8–4–4	20
17	November 6	Edmonton	1 – 5	Calgary		9–4–4	22
18	November 8	Calgary	5 – 4	Los Angeles		10–4–4	24
19	November 11	Calgary	2 – 3	Minnesota	OT	10–5–4	24
20	November 12	Calgary	2 – 3	Winnipeg		10–6–4	24
21	November 14	Los Angeles	8 – 6	Calgary		10–7–4	24
22	November 16	Buffalo	4 – 4	Calgary	OT	10–7–5	25
23	November 18	Chicago	4 – 4	Calgary	OT	10–7–6	26
24	November 20	Calgary	2 – 3	Montreal		10–8–6	26
25	November 21	Calgary	4 – 4	Quebec	OT	10–8–7	27
26	November 24	Calgary	2 – 3	Detroit		10–9–7	27
27	November 25	Calgary	3 – 3	St. Louis	OT	10–9–8	28
28	November 30	Minnesota	2 – 5	Calgary		11–9–8	30

December: 6–4–2 (home: 5–2–0; road: 1–2–2)

#	Date	Visitor	Score	Home	OT	Record	Points
29	December 2	Toronto	4 – 7	Calgary		12–9–8	32
30	December 6	Winnipeg	3 – 4	Calgary		12–10–8	32
31	December 10	Calgary	1 – 4	Winnipeg		12–11–8	32
32	December 11	Calgary	3 – 3	Edmonton	OT	12–11–9	33
33	December 14	Quebec	2 – 8	Calgary		13–11–9	35
34	December 16	Pittsburgh	3 – 4	Calgary		14–11–9	37
35	December 19	Calgary	2 – 1	Vancouver		15–11–9	39
36	December 20	Vancouver	1 – 2	Calgary	OT	16–11–9	41
37	December 23	Calgary	1 – 2	Edmonton		16–12–9	41
38	December 27	Calgary	5 – 5	Los Angeles		16–12–10	42
39	December 29	Winnipeg	2 – 1	Calgary	OT	16–13–10	42
40	December 30	Montreal	3 – 5	Calgary		17–13–10	44

January: 8–2–3 (home: 4–1–1; road: 4–1–2)

#	Date	Visitor	Score	Home	OT	Record	Points
41	January 2	Philadelphia	4 – 4	Calgary	OT	17–13–11	45
42	January 5	Hartford	4 – 6	Calgary		18–13–11	47
43	January 7	Calgary	3 – 1	Edmonton		19–13–11	49
44	January 9	Edmonton	3 – 2	Calgary	OT	19–14–11	49
45	January 11	Buffalo	3 – 5	Calgary		20–14–11	51
46	January 13	Calgary	5 – 6	Toronto		20–15–11	51
47	January 14	Calgary	6 – 5	Chicago		21–15–11	53
48	January 16	Calgary	5 – 2	St. Louis		22–15–11	55
49	January 18	Calgary	2 – 2	Boston	OT	22–15–12	56
50	January 19	Calgary	3 – 3	Hartford	OT	22–15–13	57
51	January 25	NY Rangers	5 – 8	Calgary		23–15–13	59
52	January 27	Minnesota	1 – 3	Calgary		24–15–13	61
53	January 30	Calgary	7 – 2	Vancouver		25–15–13	63

February: 6–5–0 (home: 3–2–0; road: 3–3–0)

#	Date	Visitor	Score	Home	OT	Record	Points
54	February 1	Vancouver	3 – 4	Calgary	OT	26–15–13	65
55	February 3	Calgary	3 – 4	Los Angeles		26–16–13	65
56	February 6	Los Angeles	5 – 3	Calgary		26–17–13	65
57	February 10	Calgary	5 – 7	Detroit		26–18–13	65
58	February 11	Calgary	5 – 2	NY Rangers		27–18–13	67
59	February 13	Calgary	4 – 2	NY Islanders		28–18–13	69
60	February 15	Calgary	4 – 1	Chicago		29–18–13	71
61	February 18	Calgary	1 – 5	Winnipeg		29–19–13	71
62	February 20	Boston	5 – 3	Calgary		29–20–13	71
63	February 22	Toronto	2 – 12	Calgary		30–20–13	73
64	February 25	Edmonton	4 – 10	Calgary		31–20–13	75

March: 10–3–2 (home: 8–1–0; road: 2–2–2)

#	Date	Visitor	Score	Home	OT	Record	Points
65	March 1	Philadelphia	4 – 2	Calgary		31–21–13	75
66	March 3	Vancouver	1 – 5	Calgary		32–21–13	77
67	March 5	Los Angeles	0 – 5	Calgary		33–21–13	79
68	March 7	Pittsburgh	3 – 6	Calgary		34–21–13	81
69	March 9	Calgary	4 – 4	Vancouver	OT	34–21–14	82
70	March 11	Calgary	6 – 4	Winnipeg		35–21–14	84
71	March 12	Winnipeg	4 – 5	Calgary	OT	36–21–14	86
72	March 15	New Jersey	4 – 5	Calgary		37–21–14	88
73	March 17	Hartford	4 – 5	Calgary		38–21–14	90
74	March 19	St. Louis	2 – 5	Calgary		39–21–14	92
75	March 21	Calgary	4 – 5	Buffalo		39–22–14	92
76	March 24	Calgary	3 – 3	Pittsburgh	OT	39–22–15	93
77	March 25	Calgary	1 – 4	Washington		39–23–15	93
78	March 27	Calgary	4 – 2	NY Islanders		40–23–15	95
79	March 30	Edmonton	2 – 6	Calgary		41–23–15	97

April: 1–0–0 (home: 1–0–0; road: 0–0–0)

#	Date	Visitor	Score	Home	OT	Record	Points
80	April 1	Los Angeles	4 – 8	Calgary		42–23–15	99

Legend: Win (2 points) Loss (0 points) Tie (1 point)

== Playoffs ==
The Flames defense of their first Stanley Cup championship ended quickly as Calgary was stunned by the Los Angeles Kings in six games. The loss would begin a string of playoff disappointments for the Flames, who would not win another playoff round until the 2004 Stanley Cup Playoffs.

The Flames 12–4 defeat in game four of the series remains a Flames team record for most goals against in one playoff game.

1990 Stanley Cup playoffs
Smythe Division semifinal vs. Los Angeles – Kings win 4–2

#	Date	Visitor	Score	Home	OT	Attendance	Series
1	April 4	Los Angeles	5 – 3	Calgary		19,172	Los Angeles leads 1–0
2	April 6	Los Angeles	5 – 8	Calgary		20,168	Series tied 1–1
3	April 8	Calgary	1 – 2	Los Angeles	OT	16,005	Los Angeles leads 2–1
4	April 10	Calgary	4 – 12	Los Angeles		16,005	Los Angeles leads 3–1
5	April 12	Los Angeles	1 – 5	Calgary		20,107	Los Angeles leads 3–2
6	April 14	Calgary	3 – 4	Los Angeles	2OT	16,005	Los Angeles wins 4–2

Legend: Win Loss

== Player statistics ==
=== Skaters ===
Note: GP = Games played; G = Goals; A = Assists; Pts = Points; PIM = Penalty minutes

		Regular season					Playoffs
Player	#	GP	G	A	Pts	PIM	GP	G	A	Pts	PIM
Joe Nieuwendyk	25	79	45	50	95	40	6	4	6	10	4
Doug Gilmour	39	78	24	67	91	54	6	3	1	4	8
Al MacInnis	2	79	28	62	90	82	6	2	3	5	8
Sergei Makarov	42	80	24	62	86	55	6	0	6	6	3
Gary Suter	20	76	16	60	76	97	6	0	1	1	12
Gary Roberts	10	78	39	33	72	222	6	2	5	7	41
Joe Mullen	7	78	36	33	69	24	6	3	0	3	0
Theoren Fleury	14	80	31	35	66	157	6	2	3	5	10
Paul Ranheim	28	80	26	28	54	23	6	1	3	4	2
Brian MacLellan	27	65	20	18	38	26	6	0	2	2	8
Jamie Macoun	34	78	8	27	35	70	6	0	3	3	10
Joel Otto	29	75	13	20	33	116	6	2	2	4	2
Jiri Hrdina	17	64	12	18	30	31	6	0	1	1	2
Dana Murzyn	5	78	7	13	20	140	6	2	2	4	2
Brad McCrimmon	4	79	4	15	19	78	6	0	2	2	8
Ric Nattress	6	49	1	14	15	26	6	2	0	2	8
Colin Patterson	11	61	5	3	8	20	-	-	-	-	-
Jonas Bergqvist	18	22	2	5	7	10	-	-	-	-	-
Mark Hunter	22	10	2	3	5	39	-	-	-	-	-
Tim Hunter	19	67	2	3	5	279	6	0	0	0	4
Roger Johansson	21	35	0	5	5	48	-	-	-	-	-
Sergei Priakin	16	20	2	2	4	0	2	0	0	0	0
Mike Vernon	30	47	0	3	3	21	6	0	0	0	0
Jim Korn^{†}	26	9	0	2	2	26	4	1	0	1	12
Jim Peplinski	24	6	1	0	1	4	-	-	-	-	-
Brian Glynn	32	1	0	0	0	0	-	-	-	-	-
Steve Guenette	1	2	0	0	0	2	-	-	-	-	-
Stu Grimson	35	3	0	0	0	17	-	-	-	-	-
Marc Bureau	33	5	0	0	0	4	-	-	-	-	-
Ken Sabourin	55	5	0	0	0	10	-	-	-	-	-
Rick Wamsley	31	36	0	0	0	4	1	0	0	0	0

^{†}Denotes player spent time with another team before joining Calgary. Stats reflect time with the Flames only.

=== Goaltenders ===
Note: GP = Games played; TOI = Time on ice (minutes); W = Wins; L = Losses; OT = Overtime/shootout losses; GA = Goals against; SO = Shutouts; GAA = Goals against average

		Regular season								Playoffs
Player	#	GP	TOI	W	L	T	GA	SO	GAA	GP	TOI	W	L	GA	SO	GAA
Mike Vernon	30	47	2795	23	14	9	146	1	3.13	6	342	2	3	19	0	3.33
Rick Wamsley	31	36	1969	18	8	6	107	0	3.26	1	49	0	1	9	0	11.02
Steve Guenette	1	2	119	1	1	0	8	0	4.03	-	-	-	-	-	-	-

== Transactions ==
The Flames were involved in the following transactions during the 1989–90 season.

=== Trades ===
June 16, 1989	To Calgary Flames 2nd round pick in 1989 (Kent Manderville)	To Toronto Maple Leafs Rob Ramage
March 6, 1990	To Calgary Flames Jim Korn	To New Jersey Devils 5th round pick in 1990 (Petr Kuchyna)

=== Free Agents ===
Player / Former team	Player / New team

== Draft picks ==
Calgary's picks at the 1989 NHL entry draft, held in Bloomington, Minnesota.

Rnd	Pick	Player	Nationality	Position	Team (league)	NHL statistics				
Rnd	Pick	Player	Nationality	Position	Team (league)	GP	G	A	Pts	PIM
2	24	Kent Manderville	Canada	C	N/A	646	37	67	104	348
2	42	Ted Drury	United States	C	N/A	414	41	52	93	367
3	50	Veli-Pekka Kautonen	Finland	D	HIFK Helsinki (FNL)					
3	63	Corey Lyons	Canada	RW	Lethbridge Hurricanes (WHL)					
4	70	Robert Reichel	Czechoslovakia	C	CHZ LITVÍNOV (CZE)	830	252	378	630	388
4	84	Ryan O'Leary	United States	C	N/A					
5	105	Toby Kearney	United States	LW	N/A					
7	147	Alex Nikolic	Canada	LW	Cornell (ECAC)					
8	168	Kevin Wortman	United States	D	N/A	5	0	0	0	2
9	189	Sergey Gomolyako	Soviet Union	RW	Traktor Chelyabinsk (USSR)					
10	210	Dan Sawyer	United States	D	N/A					
11	231	Alexander Yudin	Soviet Union	D	HC Dynamo Moscow (USSR)					
12	252	Kenneth Kennholt	Sweden	D	Djurgårdens IF (SEL)					
S	26	Shawn Heaphy	Canada	C	N/A	1	0	0	0	2

== See also ==
- 1989–90 NHL season
