= 1990 Stanley Cup playoffs =

Ice hockey playoffs

Tournament details
- Dates: April 4–May 24, 1990
- Teams: 16
- Defending champions: Calgary Flames

Final positions
- Champions: Edmonton Oilers
- Runners-up: Boston Bruins

Tournament statistics
- Scoring leader(s): Craig Simpson (Oilers) & Mark Messier (Oilers) (31 points)

Awards
- MVP: Bill Ranford (Oilers)

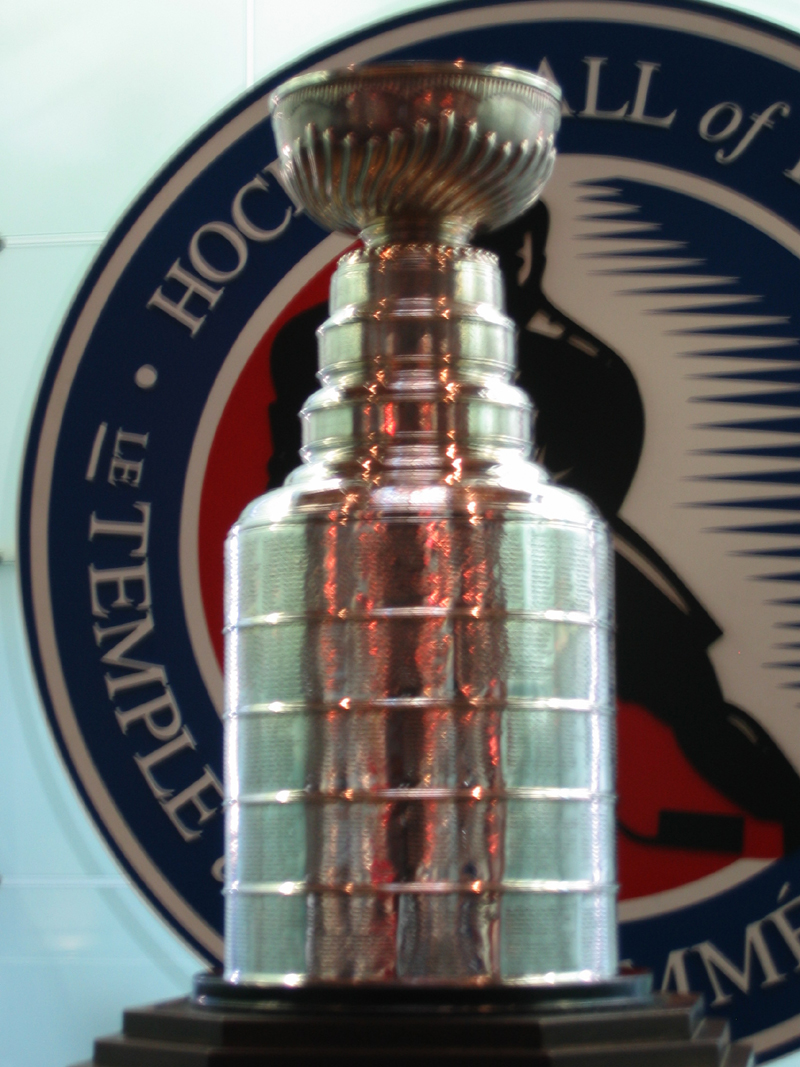
The Stanley Cup.

The 1990 Stanley Cup playoffs for the National Hockey League (NHL) championship began on April 5, 1990, following the 1989–90 regular season. The sixteen teams that qualified, from the top four teams of the four divisions, played best-of-seven series. The Conference Champions played a best-of-seven series for the Stanley Cup.

This was the last time that the Detroit Red Wings missed the playoffs until 2017. They would make the playoffs for 25 consecutive seasons from 1991 to 2016, excluding 2005, when the season was cancelled.

Since entering the NHL as expansion teams in the 1967–68 NHL season this was the first and only time until 2023 that both the Philadelphia Flyers and Pittsburgh Penguins missed the playoffs in the same season.

The playoffs concluded on May 24 with the Edmonton Oilers winning the Stanley Cup, defeating the Boston Bruins in the final series four games to one. Edmonton goaltender Bill Ranford was awarded the Conn Smythe Trophy as Most Valuable Player of the playoffs.

== Playoff seeds ==
The top four teams in each division qualified for the playoffs, as follows:

=== Prince of Wales Conference ===
==== Adams Division ====
1. Boston Bruins, Adams Division champions, Prince of Wales Conference regular season champions, Presidents' Trophy winners – 101 points
2. Buffalo Sabres – 98 points
3. Montreal Canadiens – 93 points
4. Hartford Whalers – 85 points

==== Patrick Division ====
1. New York Rangers, Patrick Division champions – 85 points
2. New Jersey Devils – 83 points
3. Washington Capitals – 78 points
4. New York Islanders – 73 points

=== Clarence Campbell Conference ===
==== Norris Division ====
1. Chicago Blackhawks, Norris Division champions – 88 points
2. St. Louis Blues – 83 points
3. Toronto Maple Leafs – 80 points
4. Minnesota North Stars – 76 points

==== Smythe Division ====
1. Calgary Flames, Smythe Division champions, Clarence Campbell Conference regular season champions – 99 points
2. Edmonton Oilers – 90 points
3. Winnipeg Jets – 85 points
4. Los Angeles Kings – 75 points

== Playoff bracket ==
In the division semifinals, the fourth seeded team in each division played against the division winner from their division. The other series matched the second and third place teams from the divisions. The two winning teams from each division's semifinals then met in the division finals. The two division winners of each conference then played in the conference finals. The two conference winners then advanced to the Stanley Cup Final.

In each round, teams competed in a best-of-seven series following a 2–2–1–1–1 format (scores in the bracket indicate the number of games won in each best-of-seven series). Home ice advantage was awarded to the team that had the better regular season record, and played at home for games one and two (and games five and seven, if necessary); the other team then played at home for games three and four (and game six, if necessary).

Division semifinals	Division finals
A1	Boston	4
A4	Hartford	3
A1	Boston	4
A3	Montreal	1
A2	Buffalo	2
A3	Montreal	4
Prince of Wales Conference
P1	NY Rangers	4
P4	NY Islanders	1
P1	NY Rangers	1
P3	Washington	4
P2	New Jersey	2
P3	Washington	4
N1	Chicago	4
N4	Minnesota	3
N1	Chicago	4
N2	St. Louis	3
N2	St. Louis	4
N3	Toronto	1
Clarence Campbell Conference
S1	Calgary	2
S4	Los Angeles	4
S4	Los Angeles	0
S2	Edmonton	4
S2	Edmonton	4
S3	Winnipeg	3

Conference finals
A1	Boston	4
P3	Washington	0
N1	Chicago	2
S2	Edmonton	4

Stanley Cup Final
A1	Boston	1
S2	Edmonton	4

== Division semifinals ==
=== Prince of Wales Conference ===
==== (A1) Boston Bruins vs. (A4) Hartford Whalers ====
This was the first playoff series between these two teams.

April 5	Hartford Whalers	4–3	Boston Bruins	Boston Garden	Recap
Todd Krygier (1) – 05:42		First period	No scoring
Dean Evason (1) – 02:41; Scott Young (1) – 06:16; Randy Ladouceur (1) – 09:19		Second period	06:29 – Cam Neely (1); 15:46 – Bobby Carpenter (1)
No scoring		Third period	19:38 – pp – Dave Poulin (1)
Peter Sidorkiewicz 33 saves / 36 shots		Goalie stats	Rejean Lemelin 13 saves / 17 shots

April 7	Hartford Whalers	1–3	Boston Bruins	Boston Garden	Recap
No scoring		First period	10:58 – pp – Ray Bourque (1)
Todd Krygier (2) – 07:42		Second period	14:06 – pp – Garry Galley (1)
No scoring		Third period	06:57 – pp – Bobby Carpenter (2)
Peter Sidorkiewicz 32 saves / 35 shots		Goalie stats	Andy Moog 25 saves / 26 shots

April 9	Boston Bruins	3–5	Hartford Whalers	Hartford Civic Center	Recap
Bobby Carpenter (3) – pp – 07:59; Dave Christian (1) – 17:20		First period	12:13 – pp – Brad Shaw (1); 14:41 – pp – Pat Verbeek (1)
No scoring		Second period	No scoring
Randy Burridge (1) – 08:25		Third period	00:36 – Dave Babych (1); 02:13 – Pat Verbeek (2); 19:42 – en – Kevin Dineen (1)
Andy Moog 22 saves / 26 shots		Goalie stats	Peter Sidorkiewicz 22 saves / 25 shots

April 11	Boston Bruins	6–5	Hartford Whalers	Hartford Civic Center	Recap
No scoring		First period	01:18 – Dean Evason (2)
Dave Christian (2) – 04:35; Glen Wesley (1) – 10:24		Second period	02:04 – Brad Shaw (2); 07:02 – Kevin Dineen (2); 08:29 – Yvon Corriveau (1); 16:15 – Ron Francis (1)
Dave Poulin (2) – 01:28; Bob Beers (1) – 07:00; Dave Christian (3) – 08:10; Dave Poulin (3) – 18:16		Third period	No scoring
Rejean Lemelin 17 saves / 22 shots Andy Moog 7 saves / 7 shots		Goalie stats	Peter Sidorkiewicz 23 saves / 29 shots

April 13	Hartford Whalers	2–3	Boston Bruins	Boston Garden	Recap
Ulf Samuelsson (1) – 09:36		First period	15:18 – pp – Brian Propp (1); 17:27 – pp – Cam Neely (2)
Dave Tippett (1) – 15:56		Second period	18:07 – sh – Cam Neely (3)
No scoring		Third period	No scoring
Peter Sidorkiewicz 15 saves / 18 shots		Goalie stats	Andy Moog 20 saves / 22 shots

April 15	Boston Bruins	2–3	OT	Hartford Whalers	Hartford Civic Center	Recap
No scoring		First period		06:31 – Scott Young (2)
Dave Poulin (4) – 09:00		Second period		01:35 – Ron Francis (2)
Randy Burridge (2) – 01:05		Third period		No scoring
No scoring		First overtime period		12:30 – Kevin Dineen (3)
Andy Moog 23 saves / 26 shots		Goalie stats		Peter Sidorkiewicz 23 saves / 25 shots

April 17	Hartford Whalers	1–3	Boston Bruins	Boston Garden	Recap
No scoring		First period	01:30 – John Byce (1); 07:29 – pp – Craig Janney (1)
No scoring		Second period	15:22 – Cam Neely (4)
Ron Francis (3) – pp – 13:48		Third period	No scoring
Peter Sidorkiewicz 22 saves / 25 shots		Goalie stats	Andy Moog 27 saves / 28 shots

Boston won series 4–3

==== (A2) Buffalo Sabres vs. (A3) Montreal Canadiens ====
This was the fourth playoff series between these two teams. Buffalo won two of the previous three meetings, including the most recent meeting in a three-game sweep in the 1983 Adams Division Semifinals.

April 5	Montreal Canadiens	1–4	Buffalo Sabres	Buffalo Memorial Auditorium	Recap
No scoring		First period	No scoring
Brian Skrudland (1) – 07:45		Second period	06:28 – Dean Kennedy (1); 09:55 – Rick Vaive (1); 19:08 – Dave Andreychuk (1)
No scoring		Third period	04:27 – Bob Corkum (1)
Patrick Roy 24 saves / 28 shots		Goalie stats	Daren Puppa 34 saves / 35 shots

April 7	Montreal Canadiens	3–0	Buffalo Sabres	Buffalo Memorial Auditorium	Recap
Mats Naslund (1) – 04:41; Stephane Richer (1) – pp – 14:09		First period	No scoring
No scoring		Second period	No scoring
Shayne Corson (1) – 14:15		Third period	No scoring
Patrick Roy 26 saves / 26 shots		Goalie stats	Daren Puppa 33 saves / 36 shots

April 9	Buffalo Sabres	1–2	OT	Montreal Canadiens	Montreal Forum	Recap
Phil Housley (1) – pp – 07:15		First period		No scoring
No scoring		Second period		10:39 – Stephane Richer (2)
No scoring		Third period		No scoring
No scoring		First overtime period		12:35 – Brian Skrudland (2)
Daren Puppa 31 saves / 33 shots		Goalie stats		Patrick Roy 30 saves / 31 shots

April 11	Buffalo Sabres	4–2	Montreal Canadiens	Montreal Forum	Recap
No scoring		First period	07:13 – Stephane Richer
Rick Vaive (2) – pp – 03:16; Doug Bodger (1) – 08:57; Pierre Turgeon (1) – 19:57		Second period	04:21 – Brian Skrudland (3)
Pierre Turgeon (2) – 01:02		Third period	No scoring
Daren Puppa 31 saves / 33 shots		Goalie stats	Patrick Roy 23 saves / 27 shots

April 13	Montreal Canadiens	4–2	Buffalo Sabres	Buffalo Memorial Auditorium	Recap
No scoring		First period	17:55 – Scott Arniel (1)
Stephane Richer (4) – 07:51; Bobby Smith (1) – 17:13; Stephane Richer (5) – 18:25		Second period	10:58 – pp – Rick Vaive (3)
Russ Courtnall (1) – en – 18:39		Third period	No scoring
Patrick Roy 30 saves / 32 shots		Goalie stats	Daren Puppa 22 saves / 25 shots

April 15	Buffalo Sabres	2–5	Montreal Canadiens	Montreal Forum	Recap
Rick Vaive (4) – pp – 10:22		First period	09:00 – pp – Mathieu Schneider (1)
No scoring		Second period	16:22 – Brent Gilchrist (1)
Dave Andreychuk (2) – pp – 06:07		Third period	04:47 – Claude Lemieux (1); 08:48 – Russ Courtnall (2); 19:04 – en – Russ Courtnall (3)
Daren Puppa 24 saves / 28 shots		Goalie stats	Patrick Roy 22 saves / 24 shots

Montreal won series 4–2

==== (P1) New York Rangers vs. (P4) New York Islanders ====
This was the seventh playoff series meeting between these two teams. The Islanders won five of the previous six meetings. The most recent the Islanders won 3–2 in the 1984 Patrick Division Semifinals.

April 5	New York Islanders	1–2	New York Rangers	Madison Square Garden	Recap
No scoring		First period	05:14 – Bernie Nicholls (1)
Bryan Trottier (1) – 14:36		Second period	13:49 – Mark Janssens (1)
No scoring		Third period	No scoring
Mark Fitzpatrick 24 saves / 26 shots		Goalie stats	Mike Richter 28 saves / 29 shots

April 7	New York Islanders	2–5	New York Rangers	Madison Square Garden	Recap
No scoring		First period	11:28 – pp – John Ogrodnick (1)
David Volek (1) – 06:49; Tom Fitzgerald (1) – 10:32		Second period	09:24 – Mark Janssens (2); 11:35 – pp – James Patrick (1); 13:01 – John Ogrodnick (2); 17:33 – pp – Bernie Nicholls (2)
No scoring		Third period	No scoring
Mark Fitzpatrick 15 saves / 19 shots Glenn Healy 13 saves / 14 shots		Goalie stats	Mike Richter 31 saves / 33 shots

April 9	New York Rangers	3–4	2OT	New York Islanders	Nassau Coliseum	Recap
Troy Mallette (1) – 06:51		First period		01:51 – pp – Brent Sutter (1)
James Patrick (2) – pp – 11:19; Bernie Nicholls (3) – pp – 12:40		Second period		No scoring
No scoring		Third period		11:47 – pp – Patrick Flatley (1); 13:09 – Hubie McDonough (1)
No scoring		Second overtime period		00:59 – pp – Brent Sutter (2)
John Vanbiesbrouck 45 saves / 49 shots		Goalie stats		Glenn Healy 34 saves / 37 shots

April 11	New York Rangers	6–1	New York Islanders	Nassau Coliseum	Recap
Brian Mullen (1) – pp – 00:41; Darren Turcotte (1) – 10:53		First period	Patrick Flatley (2) – pp – 12:25
Carey Wilson (1) – pp – 10:59; Randy Moller (1) – 12:12; John Ogrodnick (3) – 13:31		Second period	No scoring
Kelly Kisio (1) – sh – 16:31		Third period	No scoring
John Vanbiesbrouck 22 saves / 23 shots		Goalie stats	Glenn Healy 16 saves / 20 shots Mark Fitzpatrick 4 saves / 6 shots

April 13	New York Islanders	5–6	New York Rangers	Madison Square Garden	Recap
Jeff Norton (1) – 09:51; Rob DiMaio (1) – 10:20		First period	02:47 – pp – Mike Gartner (1); 15:47 – pp – John Ogrodnick (4)
No scoring		Second period	01:02 – sh – Normand Rochefort (1); 08:40 – pp – Mike Gartner (2); 11:34 – Carey Wilson (2)
Wayne McBean (1) – 01:50; Randy Wood (1) – 11:18; Patrick Flatley (3) – 16:53		Third period	11:44 – Mike Gartner (3)
Mark Fitzpatrick 15 saves / 20 shots Glenn Healy 7 saves / 8 shots		Goalie stats	Mike Richter 28 saves / 33 shots

New York Rangers won series 4–1

==== (P2) New Jersey Devils vs. (P3) Washington Capitals ====
This was the second playoff meeting between these two teams. New Jersey won their only previous meeting in seven games in the 1988 Patrick Division Finals.

April 5	Washington Capitals	5–4	OT	New Jersey Devils	Brendan Byrne Arena	Recap
Dino Ciccarelli (1) – 01:23; Dino Ciccarelli (2) – 01:47		First period		09:14 – Bruce Driver (1)
Dale Hunter (1) – 08:12; John Druce (1) – pp – 11:01		Second period		08:02 – Pat Conacher (1)
No scoring		Third period		01:45 – sh – John MacLean (1); 08:37 – pp – Peter Stastny (1)
Dino Ciccarelli (3) – 05:34		First overtime period		No scoring
Mike Liut 26 saves / 30 shots		Goalie stats		Sean Burke 19 saves / 24 shots

April 7	Washington Capitals	5–6	New Jersey Devils	Brendan Byrne Arena	Recap
No scoring		First period	06:21 – Brendan Shanahan (1); 14:58 – pp – John MacLean (2); 18:26 – pp – John MacLean (3)
Dino Ciccarelli (4) – 01:06; Bob Rouse (1) – pp – 06:20		Second period	03:37 – Ken Daneyko (1)
Kelly Miller (1) – 01:06; Bob Joyce (1) – 09:15; Dino Ciccarelli (5) – 18:54		Third period	13:12 – Eric Weinrich (1); 16:55 – Peter Stastny (2)
Mike Liut 10 saves / 13 shots Don Beaupre 23 saves / 26 shots		Goalie stats	Chris Terreri 21 saves / 26 shots

April 9	New Jersey Devils	2–1	Washington Capitals	Capital Centre	Recap
Ken Daneyko (2) – 04:51		First period	No scoring
Brendan Shanahan (2) – pp – 15:21		Second period	17:46 – pp – Dino Ciccarelli (6)
No scoring		Third period	No scoring
Chris Terreri 20 saves / 21 shots		Goalie stats	Mike Liut 8 saves / 10 shots

April 11	New Jersey Devils	1–3	Washington Capitals	Capital Centre	Recap
No scoring		First period	No scoring
Kirk Muller (1) – 13:02		Second period	02:10 – pp – Scott Stevens (1); 13:17 – John Druce (2)
No scoring		Third period	17:31 – Dino Ciccarelli (7)
Sean Burke 30 saves / 33 shots		Goalie stats	Don Beaupre 23 saves / 24 shots

April 13	Washington Capitals	4–3	New Jersey Devils	Brendan Byrne Arena	Recap
Dale Hunter (2) – 09:03		First period	No scoring
No scoring		Second period	06:07 – pp – Jon Morris (1); 14:46 – Brendan Shanahan (3)
Mike Ridley (1) – 00:27; Dino Ciccarelli (8) – 04:30; Geoff Courtnall (1) – 17:04		Third period	19:22 – Patrik Sundstrom (1)
Don Beaupre 17 saves / 20 shots		Goalie stats	Chris Terreri 20 saves / 24 shots

April 15	New Jersey Devils	2–3	Washington Capitals	Capital Centre	Recap
No scoring		First period	19:49 – Stephen Leach (1)
John MacLean (4) – 13:21		Second period	03:27 – Geoff Courtnall (2); 19:06 – John Druce (3)
Peter Stastny (3) – 05:00		Third period	No scoring
Chris Terreri 29 saves / 34 shots		Goalie stats	Don Beaupre 32 saves / 34 shots

Washington won series 4–2

=== Clarence Campbell Conference ===
==== (N1) Chicago Blackhawks vs. (N4) Minnesota North Stars ====
This was the fifth playoff series meeting between these two teams. Chicago won three of the previous four meetings, including the most recent meeting in six games in the 1985 Norris Division Finals.

April 4	Minnesota North Stars	2–1	Chicago Blackhawks	Chicago Stadium	Recap
Brian Bellows (1) – pp – 09:57		First period	No scoring
No scoring		Second period	No scoring
Brian Bellows (2) – 05:54		Third period	05:01 – pp – Denis Savard (1)
Jon Casey 30 saves / 31 shots		Goalie stats	Greg Millen 24 saves / 26 shots

April 6	Minnesota North Stars	3–5	Chicago Blackhawks	Chicago Stadium	Recap
Brian Bellows (3) – pp – 08:49; Shawn Chambers (1) – pp – 10:41; Neal Broten (1) – pp – 11:56		First period	14:24 – pp – Wayne Presley (1)
No Scoring		Second period	01:49 – Greg Gilbert (1); 03:53 – pp – Jeremy Roenick (1); 07:27 – pp – Steve Thomas (1); 16:39 – sh – Wayne Presley (2)
No Scoring		Third period	No Scoring
Jon Casey 26 saves / 31 shots		Goalie stats	Greg Millen 2 saves / 5 shots Ed Belfour 15 saves / 15 shots

April 8	Chicago Blackhawks	2–1	Minnesota North Stars	Met Center	Recap
No scoring		First period	No scoring
No scoring		Second period	No scoring
10:12 – Steve Larmer (1); 15:27 – Wayne Presley (3)		Third period	Mike Modano (1) – 19:24
Greg Millen 31 saves / 32 shots		Goalie stats	Jon Casey 27 saves / 29 shots

April 10	Chicago Blackhawks	0–4	Minnesota North Stars	Met Center	Recap
No scoring		First period	04:24 – Don Barber (1); 11:41 – pp – Don Barber (2)
No scoring		Second period	07:42 – Basil McRae (1)
No scoring		Third period	03:41 – Dave Gagner (1)
Greg Millen 10 saves / 12 shots Ed Belfour 26 saves / 28 shots		Goalie stats	Jon Casey 29 saves / 29 shots

April 12	Minnesota North Stars	1–5	Chicago Blackhawks	Chicago Stadium	Recap
No scoring		First period	10:17 – pp – Jeremy Roenick (2); 13:26 – Denis Savard (2)
Brian Bellows (4) – pp – 09:24		Second period	04:53 – Greg Gilbert (2)
No scoring		Third period	16:37 – Michel Goulet (1); 17:48 – Steve Thomas (2)
Jon Casey 31 saves / 36 shots		Goalie stats	Greg Millen 26 saves / 27 shots

April 14	Chicago Blackhawks	3–5	Minnesota North Stars	Met Center	Recap
Greg Gilbert (3) – 12:33		First period	10:28 – Shawn Chambers (2); 17:25 – Perry Berezan (1); 18:48 – Neal Broten (2)
No scoring		Second period	01:26 – Larry Murphy (1); 14:20 – pp – Dave Gagner (2)
Steve Larmer (2) – sh – 12:57; Jeremy Roenick (3) – 13:57		Third period	No scoring
Greg Millen 7 saves / 10 shots Ed Belfour 31 saves / 33 shots		Goalie stats	Jon Casey 27 saves / 30 shots

April 16	Minnesota North Stars	2–5	Chicago Blackhawks	Chicago Stadium	Recap
Don Barber (3) – pp – 09:02		First period	No scoring
No scoring		Second period	03:00 – Wayne Presley (4); 04:06 – Wayne Presley (5); 12:41 – Jeremy Roenick (4); 14:06 – Jeremy Roenick (5)
Ulf Dahlen (1) – 09:58		Third period	17:10 – Greg Gilbert (4)
Jon Casey 28 saves / 33 shots Kari Takko 0 saves / 0 shots		Goalie stats	Greg Millen 30 saves / 32 shots

Chicago won series 4–3

==== (N2) St. Louis Blues vs. (N3) Toronto Maple Leafs ====
This was the third playoff series meeting between these two teams. Both teams split their first two meetings. Toronto won the most recent meeting in six games in the 1987 Norris Division Semifinals.

April 4	Toronto Maple Leafs	2–4	St. Louis Blues	St. Louis Arena	Recap
No scoring		First period	05:18 – Brett Hull (1); 17:03 – pp – Ron Wilson (1)
Brad Marsh (1) – 01:34		Second period	No scoring
Wendel Clark (1) – 08:55		Third period	02:27 – Jeff Brown (1); 11:53 – Ron Wilson (2)
Allan Bester 29 saves / 33 shots		Goalie stats	Curtis Joseph 27 saves / 29 shots

April 6	Toronto Maple Leafs	2–4	St. Louis Blues	St. Louis Arena	Recap
Mark Osborne (1) – sh – 10:49		First period	04:52 – pp – Brett Hull (2)
No scoring		Second period	09:49 – pp – Paul MacLean (1); 13:32 – sh – Rich Sutter (1); 18:50 – Paul Cavallini (1)
Daniel Marois (1) – pp – 18:13		Third period	No scoring
Allan Bester 36 saves / 40 shots		Goalie stats	Curtis Joseph 26 saves / 28 shots

April 8	St. Louis Blues	6–5	OT	Toronto Maple Leafs	Maple Leaf Gardens	Recap
Paul MacLean (2) – 10:50		First period		05:08 – Mark Osborne (2)
Paul MacLean (3) – pp – 02:08; Dave Lowry (1) – 07:36; Brett Hull (3) – pp – 18:34		Second period		12:32 – Tom Fergus (1); 13:43 – pp – Daniel Marois (2)
Sergio Momesso (1) – 10:39		Third period		17:08 – Rob Ramage (1); 18:50 – Tom Fergus (2)
Sergio Momesso (2) – 06:04		First overtime period		No scoring
Curtis Joseph 41 saves / 46 shots		Goalie stats		Allan Bester 34 saves / 40 shots

April 10	St. Louis Blues	2–4	Toronto Maple Leafs	Maple Leaf Gardens	Recap
No scoring		First period	No scoring
Rod Brind'Amour (1) – 14:20		Second period	09:25 – Scott Pearson (1); 14:00 – pp – Gary Leeman (1)
Rod Brind'Amour (2) – pp – 13:39		Third period	04:22 – Dave Hannan (1); 19:38 – en – Eddie Olczyk (1)
Curtis Joseph 28 saves / 31 shots		Goalie stats	Jeff Reese 20 saves / 22 shots

April 12	Toronto Maple Leafs	3–4	St. Louis Blues	St. Louis Arena	Recap
Gary Leeman (2) – pp – 19:37		First period	04:00 – Kelly Chase (1); 04:40 – Brett Hull (4)
Scott Pearson (2) – 05:00		Second period	04:14 – pp – Peter Zezel (1); 09:29 – pp – Brett Hull (5)
Gary Leeman (3) – 13:47		Third period	No scoring
Jeff Reese 24 saves / 28 shots Allan Bester 7 saves / 7 shots		Goalie stats	Vincent Riendeau 2 saves / 3 shots Curtis Joseph 16 saves / 18 shots

St. Louis won series 4–1

==== (S1) Calgary Flames vs. (S4) Los Angeles Kings ====
This was the third straight and fifth overall playoff meeting between these two teams. Both teams split the previous four meetings. Calgary won last year's Smythe Division Finals in a four-game sweep.

April 4	Los Angeles Kings	5–3	Calgary Flames	Olympic Saddledome	Recap
Luc Robitaille (1) – 07:55		First period	16:52 – pp – ps – Al MacInnis (1); 18:34 – Al MacInnis (2)
No scoring		Second period	No scoring
Todd Elik (1) – pp – 04:31; Tony Granato (1) – pp – 10:26; Luc Robitaille (2) – 10:44; Steve Kasper (1) – en – 19:07		Third period	02:26 – Theoren Fleury (1)
Kelly Hrudey 23 saves / 26 shots		Goalie stats	Mike Vernon 26 saves / 30 shots

April 6	Los Angeles Kings	5–8	Calgary Flames	Olympic Saddledome	Recap
Marty McSorley (1) – pp – 18:18		First period	01:41 – Doug Gilmour (1); 05:58 – sh – Joe Mullen (1)
Luc Robitaille (3) – 12:56; Larry Robinson (1) – 14:15		Second period	06:40 – Gary Roberts (1); 10:42 – Joel Otto (1); 12:16 – Jim Korn (1); 18:58 – Doug Gilmour (2)
Luc Robitaille (4) – pp – 04:19; Dave Taylor (1) – pp – 12:52		Third period	08:36 – Joe Nieuwendyk (1); 19:58 – sh – en – Dana Murzyn (1)
Kelly Hrudey 21 saves / 26 shots Mario Gosselin 9 saves / 11 shots		Goalie stats	Mike Vernon 21 saves / 26 shots

April 8	Calgary Flames	1–2	OT	Los Angeles Kings	Great Western Forum	Recap
No scoring		First period		No scoring
No scoring		Second period		00:23 – Tomas Sandstrom (1)
Joe Mullen (2) – 14:05		Third period		No scoring
No scoring		First overtime period		08:37 – sh – Tony Granato (2)
Mike Vernon 30 saves / 32 shots		Goalie stats		Kelly Hrudey 32 saves / 33 shots

April 10	Calgary Flames	4–12	Los Angeles Kings	Great Western Forum	Recap
No scoring		First period	06:38 – Dave Taylor (2); 08:25 – Tony Granato (3); 11:06 – Tomas Sandstrom (2); 11:55 – Dave Taylor (3)
Joel Otto (2) – 09:16; Paul Ranheim (1) – 09:38; Theoren Fleury (2) – 13:25; Joe Nieuwendyk (2) – 19:05		Second period	02:26 – Tony Granato (4); 04:20 – Jay Miller (1); 07:58 – Tomas Sandstrom (3); 10:57 – Wayne Gretzky (1); 16:44 – Todd Elik (2)
No scoring		Third period	09:15 – Dave Taylor (4); 13:59 – Tomas Sandstrom (4); 17:04 – pp – Tony Granato (5)
Mike Vernon 4 saves / 7 shots Rick Wamsley 14 saves / 23 shots		Goalie stats	Kelly Hrudey 20 saves / 24 shots

April 12	Los Angeles Kings	1–5	Calgary Flames	Olympic Saddledome	Recap
No scoring		First period	15:57 – Dana Murzyn (2)
No scoring		Second period	02:35 – pp – Joe Nieuwendyk (3); 06:39 – Ric Nattress (1)
Rob Blake (1) – pp – 01:48		Third period	05:53 – Ric Nattress (2); 09:25 – Gary Roberts (2)
Kelly Hrudey 27 saves / 32 shots Mario Gosselin 3 saves / 3 shots		Goalie stats	Mike Vernon 18 saves / 19 shots

April 14	Calgary Flames	3–4	2OT	Los Angeles Kings	Great Western Forum	Recap
Joe Nieuwendyk (4) – 04:51		First period		01:08 – pp – Wayne Gretzky (2)
Doug Gilmour (3) – 18:17		Second period		No scoring
Joe Mullen (3) – 15:48		Third period		01:01 – pp – Steve Duchesne (1); 18:17 – Steve Duchesne (2)
No scoring		Second overtime period		03:14 – Mike Krushelnyski (1)
Mike Vernon 31 saves / 35 shots		Goalie stats		Kelly Hrudey 36 saves / 39 shots

Los Angeles won series 4–2

==== (S2) Edmonton Oilers vs. (S3) Winnipeg Jets ====
This was the sixth playoff meeting between these two teams. Edmonton won all five previous meetings, including their most recent in the 1988 Smythe Division Semifinals in five games.

April 4	Winnipeg Jets	7–5	Edmonton Oilers	Northlands Coliseum	Recap
Dale Hawerchuk (1) – 11:44; Dave Ellett (1) – pp – 18:21		First period	05:04 – Craig Simpson (1); 14:17 – pp – Craig Simpson (2); 16:58 – pp – Jari Kurri (1)
Moe Mantha (1) – 02:04; Dale Hawerchuk (2) – 13:46		Second period	00:35 – sh – Mark Messier (1)
Pat Elynuik (1) – 01:46; Brent Ashton (1) – pp – 09:55; Teppo Numminen (1) – en – 19:36		Third period	13:39 – pp – Petr Klima (1)
Bob Essensa 32 saves / 37 shots		Goalie stats	Bill Ranford 24 saves / 30 shots

April 6	Winnipeg Jets	2–3	OT	Edmonton Oilers	Northlands Coliseum	Recap
Brent Ashton (2) – 05:39; Paul Fenton (1) – pp – 18:41		First period		No scoring
No scoring		Second period		No scoring
No scoring		Third period		03:09 – Craig Simpson (3); 12:45 – Joe Murphy (1)
No scoring		First overtime period		04:21 – Mark Lamb (1)
Stephane Beauregard 27 saves / 30 shots		Goalie stats		Bill Ranford 23 saves / 25 shots

April 8	Edmonton Oilers	1–2	Winnipeg Jets	Winnipeg Arena	Recap
Reijo Ruotsalainen (1) – pp – 16:35		First period	No scoring
No scoring		Second period	09:35 – pp – Paul Fenton (2)
No scoring		Third period	15:30 – Dale Hawerchuk (3)
Bill Ranford 28 saves / 30 shots		Goalie stats	Bob Essensa 15 saves / 16 shots

April 10	Edmonton Oilers	3–4	2OT	Winnipeg Jets	Winnipeg Arena	Recap
Petr Klima (2) – 02:07; Steve Smith (1) – sh – 18:01		First period		04:55 – Mark Kumpel (1); 11:42 – Pat Elynuik (2); 12:04 – Doug Evans (1)
Esa Tikkanen (1) – 19:25		Second period		No scoring
No scoring		Third period		No scoring
No scoring		Second overtime period		01:08 – pp – Dave Ellett (2)
Bill Ranford 36 saves / 40 shots		Goalie stats		Stephane Beauregard 16 saves / 17 shots Bob Essensa 15 saves / 17 shots

April 12	Winnipeg Jets	3–4	Edmonton Oilers	Northlands Coliseum	Recap
Thomas Steen (1) – pp – 19:00		First period	08:08 – pp – Esa Tikkanen (2)
Greg Paslawski (1) – 01:55; Brent Ashton (3) – pp – 07:47		Second period	13:57 – Craig Simpson (4); 14:10 – Mark Lamb (2)
No scoring		Third period	03:53 – Mark Messier (2)
Stephane Beauregard 29 saves / 33 shots		Goalie stats	Bill Ranford 26 saves / 29 shots

April 14	Edmonton Oilers	4–3	Winnipeg Jets	Winnipeg Arena	Recap
Esa Tikkanen (3) – 05:29; Mark Messier (3) – 09:50; Randy Gregg (1) – pp – 16:52		First period	No scoring
No scoring		Second period	11:35 – Mark Kumpel (2)
Jari Kurri (2) – 13:10		Third period	03:44 – Doug Smail (1); 09:17 – Doug Evans (2)
Bill Ranford 23 saves / 26 shots		Goalie stats	Bob Essensa 26 saves / 30 shots

April 16	Winnipeg Jets	1–4	Edmonton Oilers	Northlands Coliseum	Recap
Thomas Steen (2) – 09:21		First period	08:54 – Glenn Anderson (1); 17:52 – Mark Lamb (3)
No scoring		Second period	No scoring
No scoring		Third period	05:09 – Esa Tikkanen (4); 17:48 – Jari Kurri (3)
Stephane Beauregard 21 saves / 25 shots		Goalie stats	Bill Ranford 26 saves / 27 shots

Edmonton won series 4–3

== Division finals ==
=== Prince of Wales Conference ===
==== (A1) Boston Bruins vs. (A3) Montreal Canadiens ====
This was the 25th playoff series meeting between these two teams. Montreal lead the all-time meetings 21–3. This was also the seventh straight year meeting in the playoffs, with Montreal winning last year's Adams Division Finals in five games.

April 19	Montreal Canadiens	0–1	Boston Bruins	Boston Garden	Recap
No scoring		First period	No scoring
No scoring		Second period	17:37 – pp – Dave Poulin (5)
No scoring		Third period	No scoring
Patrick Roy 27 saves / 28 shots		Goalie stats	Andy Moog 20 saves / 20 shots

April 21	Montreal Canadiens	4–5	OT	Boston Bruins	Boston Garden	Recap
Mike McPhee (1) – 01:48		First period		06:24 – Brian Propp (2)
Stephane Richer (6) – 01:54; Shayne Corson (2) – 05:30		Second period		03:43 – Cam Neely (5); 12:28 – John Carter (1)
Stephane Richer (7) – 12:50		Third period		18:11 – pp – Cam Neely (6)
No scoring		First overtime period		03:42 – Garry Galley (2)
Patrick Roy 19 saves / 24 shots		Goalie stats		Andy Moog 30 saves / 34 shots

April 23	Boston Bruins	6–3	Montreal Canadiens	Montreal Forum	Recap
John Carter (2) – sh – 09:49; Ray Bourque (2) – 13:02		First period	15:09 – Brent Gilchrist (2)
John Carter (3) – 05:30; Brian Propp (3) – 06:58; Don Sweeney (1) – pp – 13:49		Second period	03:10 – Russ Courtnall (4)
Dave Poulin (6) – 07:48		Third period	14:23 – Russ Courtnall (5)
Andy Moog 20 saves / 23 shots		Goalie stats	Patrick Roy 8 saves / 12 shots Brian Hayward 16 saves / 18 shots

April 25	Boston Bruins	1–4	Montreal Canadiens	Montreal Forum	Recap
No scoring		First period	11:16 – Guy Carbonneau (1)
John Carter (4) – 18:23		Second period	No scoring
No scoring		Third period	04:22 – Stephan Lebeau (1); 11:51 – Stephan Lebeau (2); 19:19 – en – Guy Carbonneau (2)
Andy Moog 32 saves / 35 shots		Goalie stats	Patrick Roy 28 saves / 29 shots

April 27	Montreal Canadiens	1–3	Boston Bruins	Boston Garden	Recap
No scoring		First period	10:00 – sh – Randy Burridge (3)
Stephan Lebeau (3) – 19:27		Second period	No scoring
No scoring		Third period	18:47 – Glen Wesley (2); 19:55 – en – Cam Neely (7)
Patrick Roy 28 saves / 30 shots		Goalie stats	Andy Moog 23 saves / 24 shots

Boston won series 4–1

==== (P1) New York Rangers vs. (P3) Washington Capitals ====
This was the second playoff series meeting between these two teams. New York won the only previous meeting in six games in the 1986 Patrick Division Finals.

April 19	Washington Capitals	3–7	New York Rangers	Madison Square Garden	Recap
No scoring		First period	11:04 – Bernie Nicholls (4)
No scoring		Second period	02:44 – pp – Brian Mullen (2); 08:03 – sh – Jan Erixon (1)
Bob Rouse (2) – 03:01; John Druce (4) – 08:20; Scott Stevens (2) – 09:29		Third period	05:55 – John Ogrodnick (5); 11:49 – Bernie Nicholls (5); 13:26 – pp – Mike Gartner (4); 17:36 – pp – Bernie Nicholls (6)
Mike Liut 31 saves / 38 shots		Goalie stats	John Vanbiesbrouck 32 saves / 35 shots

April 21	Washington Capitals	6–3	New York Rangers	Madison Square Garden	Recap
Mike Ridley (2) – 07:36; John Druce (5) – pp – 08:59		First period	10:29 – Kelly Kisio (2)
Bob Joyce (2) – 00:45; John Druce (6) – 01:10; Dale Hunter (3) – pp – 04:53		Second period	02:27 – James Patrick (3); 19:35 – pp – Mike Gartner (5)
John Druce (7) – sh – en – 19:07		Third period	No scoring
Don Beaupre 25 saves / 28 shots		Goalie stats	John Vanbiesbrouck 7 saves / 12 shots Mike Richter 12 saves / 12 shots

April 23	New York Rangers	1–7	Washington Capitals	Capital Centre	Recap
Paul Broten (1) – sh – 09:29		First period	06:04 – pp – John Druce (8); 08:20 – Geoff Courtnall (3); 10:33 – pp – John Druce (9); 11:29 – sh – Mike Ridley (3)
No scoring		Second period	04:14 – Calle Johansson (1)
No scoring		Third period	11:58 – pp – Geoff Courtnall (4); 17:05 – Stephen Leach (2)
Mike Richter 42 saves / 49 shots		Goalie stats	Mike Liut 17 saves / 18 shots Don Beaupre 1 save / 1 shot

April 25	New York Rangers	3–4	OT	Washington Capitals	Capital Centre	Recap
Troy Mallette (2) – 10:41		First period		No scoring
No scoring		Second period		13:13 – Tim Bergland (1); 19:13 – pp – John Druce (10)
John Ogrodnick (6) – pp – 15:57; Bernie Nicholls (7) – 18:48		Third period		00:56 – pp – John Druce (11)
No scoring		First overtime period		00:34 – Rod Langway (1)
Mike Richter 21 saves / 25 shots John Vanbiesbrouck 0 saves / 0 shots		Goalie stats		Mike Liut 30 saves / 33 shots

April 27	Washington Capitals	2–1	OT	New York Rangers	Madison Square Garden	Recap
Kelly Miller (2) – 03:16		First period		No scoring
No scoring		Second period		No scoring
No scoring		Third period		01:47 – Normand Rochefort (2)
John Druce (12) – 06:48		First overtime period		No scoring
Mike Liut 28 saves / 29 shots		Goalie stats		John Vanbiesbrouck 32 saves / 34 shots

Washington won series 4–1

=== Clarence Campbell Conference ===
==== (N1) Chicago Blackhawks vs. (N2) St. Louis Blues ====
This was the third straight and seventh overall playoff meeting between these two teams. Chicago won five of the prior six meetings, including last year's Norris Division Finals in five games.

April 18	St. Louis Blues	4–3	Chicago Blackhawks	Chicago Stadium	Recap
Rod Brind'Amour (3) – 05:42; Rick Meagher (1) – 18:58		First period	09:26 – Doug Wilson (1)
Rod Brind'Amour (4) – 06:05; Brett Hull (6) – 10:59		Second period	13:43 – pp – Trent Yawney (1); 18:24 – Adam Creighton (1)
No scoring		Third period	No scoring
Vincent Riendeau 29 saves / 32 shots		Goalie stats	Greg Millen 9 saves / 13 shots Ed Belfour 13 saves / 13 shots

April 20	St. Louis Blues	3–5	Chicago Blackhawks	Chicago Stadium	Recap
No scoring		First period	12:39 – pp – Steve Larmer (3)
Brett Hull (7) – 00:35		Second period	06:18 – Wayne Presley (6)
Brett Hull (8) – pp – 07:06; Paul Cavallini (2) – 14:34		Third period	08:37 – pp – Troy Murray (1); 08:47 – Steve Thomas (3); 19:46 – en – Jeremy Roenick (6)
Vincent Riendeau 24 saves / 28 shots		Goalie stats	Greg Millen 24 saves / 27 shots

April 22	Chicago Blackhawks	4–5	St. Louis Blues	St. Louis Arena	Recap
Doug Wilson (2) – pp – 02:12		First period	00:18 – Sergio Momesso (3); 16:46 – pp – Brett Hull (9)
Dave Manson (1) – 04:38		Second period	09:42 – pp – Jeff Brown (2)
Bob Murray (1) – 12:26; Steve Thomas (4) – 14:38		Third period	15:24 – Brett Hull (10); 19:51 – Gino Cavallini (1)
Greg Millen 23 saves / 28 shots		Goalie stats	Vincent Riendeau 44 saves / 48 shots

April 24	Chicago Blackhawks	3–2	St. Louis Blues	St. Louis Arena	Recap
No scoring		First period	No scoring
Wayne Presley (7) – 02:06; Michel Goulet (2) – 02:42; Trent Yawney (2) – pp – 18:09		Second period	12:53 – Rod Brind'Amour (5)
No scoring		Third period	05:26 – pp – Ron Wilson (3)
Ed Belfour 31 saves / 33 shots		Goalie stats	Vincent Riendeau 22 saves / 25 shots

April 26	St. Louis Blues	2–3	Chicago Blackhawks	Chicago Stadium	Recap
Adam Oates (1) – pp – 14:05		First period	No scoring
Brett Hull (11) – pp – 14:33		Second period	03:56 – Jocelyn Lemieux (1); 04:59 – Troy Murray (2); 06:12 – Steve Thomas (5)
No scoring		Third period	No scoring
Vincent Riendeau 29 saves / 32 shots		Goalie stats	Ed Belfour 18 saves / 20 shots

April 28	Chicago Blackhawks	2–4	St. Louis Blues	St. Louis Arena	Recap
No scoring		First period	01:36 – pp – Brett Hull (12); 02:30 – Dave Lowry (2)
Denis Savard (3) – pp – 07:39; Jeremy Roenick (7) – pp – 14:32		Second period	15:18 – Brett Hull (13)
No scoring		Third period	11:07 – Rich Sutter (2)
Ed Belfour 0 saves / 2 shots Jacques Cloutier 24 saves / 26 shots		Goalie stats	Vincent Riendeau 37 saves / 39 shots

April 30	St. Louis Blues	2–8	Chicago Blackhawks	Chicago Stadium	Recap
No scoring		First period	02:47 – Jeremy Roenick (8); 13:03 – Jeremy Roenick (9)
Paul MacLean (4) – pp – 12:06		Second period	03:03 – sh – Steve Larmer (4); 07:28 – Denis Savard (4); 10:22 – pp – Dave Manson (2)
Adam Oates (2) – 17:19		Third period	00:35 – Greg Gilbert (5); 03:45 – sh – Adam Creighton (2); 19:49 – Duane Sutter (1)
Vincent Riendeau 11 saves / 15 shots Curtis Joseph 10 saves / 14 shots		Goalie stats	Ed Belfour 26 saves / 28 shots

Chicago won series 4–3

==== (S2) Edmonton Oilers vs. (S4) Los Angeles Kings ====
This was the second straight and fifth overall playoff meeting between these two teams. The teams split the previous four meetings. Los Angeles won last year's Smythe Division Semifinals in seven games.

April 18	Los Angeles Kings	0–7	Edmonton Oilers	Northlands Coliseum	Recap
No scoring		First period	04:41 – Glenn Anderson (2); 09:38 – Jari Kurri (4)
No scoring		Second period	14:31 – pp – Mark Messier (4); 17:47 – Martin Gelinas (1)
No scoring		Third period	00:57 – Esa Tikkanen (5); 10:26 – Joe Murphy (2); 13:57 – Esa Tikkanen (6)
Kelly Hrudey 16 saves / 23 shots		Goalie stats	Bill Ranford 25 saves / 25 shots

April 20	Los Angeles Kings	1–6	Edmonton Oilers	Northlands Coliseum	Recap
No scoring		First period	09:12 – Martin Gelinas (2)
No scoring		Second period	11:11 – pp – Craig Simpson (5)
Chris Kontos (1) – pp – 03:45		Third period	13:14 – pp – Jari Kurri (5); 14:29 – pp – Mark Lamb (4); 16:38 – sh – Esa Tikkanen (7); 17:39 – Craig MacTavish (1)
Kelly Hrudey 19 saves / 24 shots		Goalie stats	Bill Ranford 33 saves / 34 shots Eldon Reddick 1 save / 1 shots

April 22	Edmonton Oilers	5–4	Los Angeles Kings	Great Western Forum	Recap
Craig Simpson (6) – pp – 15:26		First period	01:06 – Tomas Sandstrom (5); 19:20 – Larry Robinson (2); 19:31 – Todd Elik (3)
Craig Simpson (7) – 05:34; Petr Klima (3) – 06:50; Reijo Ruotsalainen (2) – 12:13; Adam Graves (1) – 15:33		Second period	No scoring
No scoring		Third period	18:51 – Wayne Gretzky (3)
Bill Ranford 35 saves / 39 shots		Goalie stats	Ron Scott 6 saves / 10 shots Mario Gosselin 7 saves / 8 shots

April 24	Edmonton Oilers	6–5	OT	Los Angeles Kings	Great Western Forum	Recap
Mark Messier (5) – 04:57; Glenn Anderson (3) – 12:02		First period		No scoring
Mark Lamb (5)- 08:28; Craig Simpson (8) – 10:38		Second period		02:44 – Keith Crowder (1); 13:39 – Bob Kudelski (1); 17:52 – Luc Robitaille (5); 18:38 – John Tonelli (1)
Esa Tikkanen (8) – 17:05		Third period		01:15 – sh – Mike Allison (1)
Joe Murphy (3) – 04:42		First overtime period		No scoring
Bill Ranford 34 saves / 39 shots		Goalie stats		Kelly Hrudey 31 saves / 37 shots

Edmonton won series 4–0

== Conference finals ==
=== Prince of Wales Conference final ===
==== (A1) Boston Bruins vs. (P3) Washington Capitals ====
This was the first playoff meeting between these two teams.

May 3	Washington Capitals	3–5	Boston Bruins	Boston Garden	Recap
John Druce (13) – pp – 10:08		First period	01:18 – Garry Galley (3); 18:37 – pp – Cam Neely (8)
John Tucker (1) – 16:18; Kelly Miller (3) – sh – 17:39		Second period	No scoring
No scoring		Third period	01:05 – Dave Poulin (7); 14:38 – Brian Propp (4); 19:45 – en – Dave Poulin (8)
Mike Liut 30 saves / 34 shots		Goalie stats	Andy Moog 23 saves / 26 shots

May 5	Washington Capitals	0–3	Boston Bruins	Boston Garden	Recap
No scoring		First period	No scoring
No scoring		Second period	03:23 – Bobby Carpenter (4)
No scoring		Third period	02:56 – Cam Neely (9); 06:03 – Craig Janney (2)
Don Beaupre 27 saves / 30 shots		Goalie stats	Andy Moog 28 saves / 28 shots

May 7	Boston Bruins	4–1	Washington Capitals	Capital Centre	Recap
Dave Christian (4) – pp – 06:53		First period	No scoring
Craig Janney (3) – 18:08		Second period	15:23 – pp – John Druce (14)
Randy Burridge (4) – 09:59; Cam Neely (10) – en – 19:39		Third period	No scoring
Andy Moog 25 saves / 26 shots		Goalie stats	Don Beaupre 20 saves / 23 shots

May 9	Boston Bruins	3–2	Washington Capitals	Capital Centre	Recap
John Carter (5) – 00:53; Cam Neely (11) – pp – 18:42		First period	No scoring
No scoring		Second period	15:32 – Nick Kypreos (1)
Cam Neely (12) – 02:08		Third period	10:27 – Dale Hunter (4)
Andy Moog 12 saves / 14 shots		Goalie stats	Mike Liut 14 saves / 17 shots

Boston won series 4–0

=== Clarence Campbell Conference final ===
==== (S2) Edmonton Oilers vs. (N1) Chicago Blackhawks ====
This was the third playoff series meeting between these two teams. Edmonton won both prior playoff meetings, including the most recent in six games in the 1985 Clarence Campbell Conference Final.

May 2	Chicago Blackhawks	2–5	Edmonton Oilers	Northlands Coliseum	Recap
No scoring		First period	09:42 – Mark Messier (6)
No scoring		Second period	03:17 – Mark Lamb (6); 08:52 – Steve Smith (2)
Wayne Presley (8) – 00:57; Steve Larmer (5) – pp – 06:55		Third period	04:43 – Steve Smith (3); 07:39 – Craig MacTavish (2)
Ed Belfour 23 saves / 28 shots		Goalie stats	Bill Ranford 23 saves / 25 shots

May 4	Chicago Blackhawks	4–3	Edmonton Oilers	Northlands Coliseum	Recap
Troy Murray (3) – 17:50		First period	No scoring
Denis Savard (5) – 02:020; Steve Thomas (6) – 17:36		Second period	09:49 – Glenn Anderson (4); 18:01 – pp – Jari Kurri (6)
Doug Wilson (3) – 18:01		Third period	02:10 – Esa Tikkanen (9)
Greg Millen 24 saves / 27 shots		Goalie stats	Bill Ranford 35 saves / 39 shots

May 6	Edmonton Oilers	1–5	Chicago Blackhawks	Chicago Stadium	Recap
Craig Simpson (9) – pp – 06:01		First period	08:41 – Bob Murray (2); 12:32 – Steve Larmer (6)
No scoring		Second period	03:05 – Steve Larmer (7)
No scoring		Third period	07:27 – sh – Dirk Graham (1); 13:51 – Wayne Presley (9)
Bill Ranford 24 saves / 29 shots		Goalie stats	Greg Millen 31 saves / 32 shots

May 8	Edmonton Oilers	4–2	Chicago Blackhawks	Chicago Stadium	Recap
Glenn Anderson (5) – pp – 15:02; Mark Messier (7) – 17:25		First period	18:22 – pp – Denis Savard (6)
Craig Simpson (10) – 00:11; Mark Messier (8) – 14:06		Second period	07:16 – Jeremy Roenick (10)
No scoring		Third period	No scoring
Bill Ranford 25 saves / 27 shots		Goalie stats	Greg Millen 1 save / 4 shots Jacques Cloutier 11 saves / 12 shots

May 10	Chicago Blackhawks	3–4	Edmonton Oilers	Northlands Coliseum	Recap
Steve Konroyd (1) – 14:14		First period	02:08 – Randy Gregg (2); 12:25 – pp – Craig Simpson (11); 14:32 – Adam Graves (2)
Troy Murray (4) – 04:03; Denis Savard (7) – pp – 12:45		Second period	18:29 – pp – Jari Kurri (7)
No scoring		Third period	No scoring
Jacques Cloutier 30 saves / 34 shots		Goalie stats	Bill Ranford 18 saves / 21 shots

May 12	Edmonton Oilers	8–4	Chicago Blackhawks	Chicago Stadium	Recap
Esa Tikkanen (10) – sh – 02:01; Craig Simpson (12) – pp – 12:26; Petr Klima (4) – 15:11		First period	05:01 – pp – Jeremy Roenick (11)
Adam Graves (3) – 05:17; Joe Murphy (4) – 15:22; Glenn Anderson (6) – 17:31; Mark Messier (9) – 17:48		Second period	No scoring
Steve Smith (4) – 03:06		Third period	01:31 – Adam Creighton (3); 08:11 – Steve Thomas (7); 09:04 – pp – Trent Yawney (3)
Bill Ranford 26 saves / 30 shots		Goalie stats	Greg Millen 18 saves / 25 shots Jacques Cloutier 2 saves / 3 shots

Edmonton won series 4–2

== Stanley Cup Final ==
This was the second Final series meeting between these two teams. Edmonton won the only previous meeting sweeping the Bruins in the 1988 Stanley Cup Final.

The Edmonton Oilers defeated the Boston Bruins in five games. For the Oilers, it was their fifth Cup win in seven years, and their only one without Wayne Gretzky. In game one, Petr Klima scored at 15:13 of the third overtime period to give the Oilers a 3–2 win. The game broke the record for longest Finals game, set in 1931 between Chicago and Montreal. This game remains the longest in Stanley Cup Final history (Longest NHL overtime games) to date, edging both Brett Hull's cup-winner in 1999 and Igor Larionov's game-winner in 2002 by less than 30 seconds. In game five at the Boston Garden on May 24, the Oilers won 4–1, with Craig Simpson scoring the game-winning goal.

May 15	Edmonton Oilers	3–2	3OT	Boston Bruins	Boston Garden	Recap
Adam Graves (4) – 09:46		First period		No scoring
Glenn Anderson (7) – 13:00		Second period		No scoring
No scoring		Third period		03:43 – Ray Bourque (3); 18:31 – Ray Bourque (4)
Petr Klima (5) – 15:13		Third overtime period		No scoring
Bill Ranford 50 saves / 52 shots		Goalie stats		Andy Moog 28 saves / 31 shots

May 18	Edmonton Oilers	7–2	Boston Bruins	Boston Garden	Recap
Adam Graves (5) – 08:38; Jari Kurri (8) – pp – 10:53		First period	19:07 – Ray Bourque (5)
Jari Kurri (9) – 04:21; Craig Simpson (13) – 15:28; Esa Tikkanen (11) – 17:10; Joe Murphy (5) – 19:12		Second period	02:56 – pp – Greg Hawgood (1)
Jari Kurri (10) – pp – 07:27		Third period	No scoring
Bill Ranford 25 saves / 27 shots		Goalie stats	Andy Moog 1 save / 4 shots Rejean Lemelin 14 saves / 18 shots

May 20	Boston Bruins	2–1	Edmonton Oilers	Northlands Coliseum	Recap
John Byce (2) – 00:10; Greg Johnston (1) – 15:04		First period	No scoring
No scoring		Second period	No scoring
No scoring		Third period	05:54 – pp – Esa Tikkanen (12)
Andy Moog 28 saves / 29 shots		Goalie stats	Bill Ranford 20 saves / 22 shots

May 22	Boston Bruins	1–5	Edmonton Oilers	Northlands Coliseum	Recap
No scoring		First period	02:13 – pp – Glenn Anderson (8); 16:27 – Glenn Anderson (9)
No scoring		Second period	01:00 – Craig Simpson (14); 19:15 – Esa Tikkanen (13)
John Carter (6) – 15:02		Third period	18:36 – Craig Simpson (15)
Andy Moog 28 saves / 33 shots		Goalie stats	Bill Ranford 24 saves / 25 shots

May 24	Edmonton Oilers	4–1	Boston Bruins	Boston Garden	Recap
No scoring		First period	No scoring
Glenn Anderson (10) – 01:17; Craig Simpson (16) – 09:31		Second period	No scoring
Steve Smith (5) – 06:09; Joe Murphy (6) – 14:53		Third period	16:30 – Lyndon Byers (1)
Bill Ranford 29 saves / 30 shots		Goalie stats	Andy Moog 18 saves / 22 shots

Edmonton won series 4–1

== Playoff statistics ==
=== Skaters ===
These are the top ten skaters based on points.

Player	Team	GP	G	A	Pts	+/–	PIM
Craig Simpson	Edmonton Oilers	22	16	15	31	+11	8
Mark Messier	Edmonton Oilers	22	9	22	31	+5	20
Cam Neely	Boston Bruins	21	12	16	28	+7	51
Jari Kurri	Edmonton Oilers	22	10	15	25	+13	18
Esa Tikkanen	Edmonton Oilers	22	13	11	24	+12	26
Glenn Anderson	Edmonton Oilers	22	10	12	22	+12	20
Steve Larmer	Chicago Blackhawks	20	7	15	22	+2	8
Denis Savard	Chicago Blackhawks	20	7	15	22	0	41
Craig Janney	Boston Bruins	18	3	19	22	+3	2
Brett Hull	St. Louis Blues	12	13	8	21	+1	17

=== Goaltenders ===
This is a combined table of the top five goaltenders based on goals against average and the top five goaltenders based on save percentage, with at least 420 minutes played. The table is sorted by GAA, and the criteria for inclusion are bolded.

Player	Team	GP	W	L	SA	GA	GAA	SV%	SO	TOI
Andy Moog	Boston Bruins	20	13	7	484	44	**2.21**	**.909**	2	1195:14
Patrick Roy	Montreal Canadiens	11	5	6	291	26	**2.43**	**.911**	1	640:46
Bill Ranford	Edmonton Oilers	22	16	6	671	59	**2.53**	**.912**	1	1401:13
Peter Sidorkiewicz	Hartford Whalers	7	3	4	193	23	**3.21**	**.881**	0	429:26
Mike Liut	Washington Capitals	9	4	4	222	28	**3.31**	**.874**	0	507:14

== See also ==
- 1989–90 NHL season
- List of NHL seasons

== Notes ==
Preceded by 1989 Stanley Cup playoffs	Stanley Cup Champions	Succeeded by 1991 Stanley Cup playoffs
