= Laurie Boschman =

Canadian ice hockey player (born 1960)

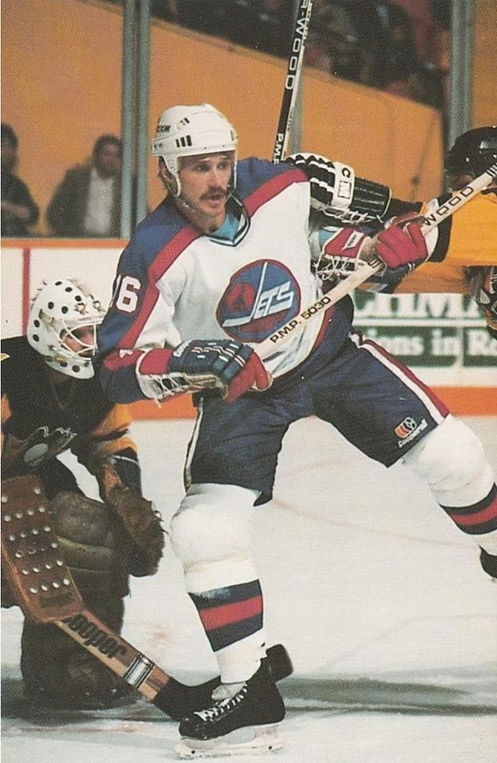
- Born: June 4, 1960 (age 66) Major, Saskatchewan, Canada
- Height: 6 ft 0 in (183 cm)
- Weight: 185 lb (84 kg; 13 st 3 lb)
- Position: Centre
- Shot: Left
- Played for: Toronto Maple Leafs; Edmonton Oilers; Winnipeg Jets; New Jersey Devils; Ottawa Senators
- National team: Canada
- NHL draft: 9th overall, 1979; Toronto Maple Leafs
- Playing career: 1979–1995

Laurie Joseph Boschman (born June 4, 1960) is a Canadian former professional ice hockey centre who played in the National Hockey League (NHL) for 14 seasons for the Toronto Maple Leafs, Edmonton Oilers, Winnipeg Jets, New Jersey Devils and Ottawa Senators. In his final NHL season, Boschman served as the first captain of the Ottawa Senators. Boschman was born in Major, Saskatchewan, but grew up in Kerrobert, Saskatchewan. As of completion of the 2023–24 season, Boschman is one of only 17 players in NHL history to have recorded over 500 points and over 2,000 penalty minutes in their career.

== Junior hockey ==
Boschman played with the Brandon Travellers of the Manitoba Junior Hockey League for two abbreviated seasons in 1975 through to 1976. He joined the Brandon Wheat Kings of the Western Canada Hockey League (WCHL) at the end of the 1976–77 season, appearing in three games with the Wheat Kings, earning an assist. His play earned him regular minutes during the 1977 WCHL playoffs and in 12 playoff games with Brandon, Boschman had a goal and two points. The Wheat Kings made the WCHL playoff seven-game final against the New Westminster Bruins but ultimately lost the series in five games, four games to one.

In his first full season with the Wheat Kings in 1977–78, Boschman registered with 42 goals and 99 points in 72 games, as well as accumulating 227 penalty minutes, helping Brandon have the best record in the league. In the post-season, Boschman had two goals and seven points in six games, as the Wheat Kings were eliminated in the division semi-finals on goal differential. Boschman exploded offensively for Brandon in the 1978–79 season, as he had 66 goals and 149 points in 65 games, finishing only behind linemates Brian Propp and Ray Allison in league scoring. The Wheat Kings finished the season with a 58–5–9 record, scoring 491 goals. In the post-season, Boschman had 11 goals and 34 points in 22 games, as Brandon defeated the Portland Winter Hawks to win the President's Cup and earn a berth in the 1979 Memorial Cup. In five Memorial Cup games, Boschman had three goals and seven points. The Wheat Kings were on the verge of elimination before Boschman scored a pair of goals in the third game victory over the Trois-Rivières Draveurs to keep the team alive in the tournament. After another win over the Peterborough Petes in the round-robin portion of the tournament, the Wheat Kings made the final on goal differential. The Wheat Kings lost to the Petes in the final game by a 2–1 score in overtime. Boschman was named to the Western Hockey League first all-star team and the Memorial Cup first all-star team.

== Professional career ==
=== Toronto Maple Leafs ===
The Toronto Maple Leafs of the National Hockey League (NHL) entered the 1979 NHL entry draft with only one pick in the first two rounds of the draft. The general manager, Punch Imlach, had narrowed his choice down to two of the Wheat Kings' top line; Boschman and Propp. Imlach ultimately chose Boschman with the ninth overall selection in the first round. Boschman made the Maple Leafs as a 19-year-old, and debuted on October 10, 1979, registering his first point; an assist on Ron Ellis' third period goal in a 6–3 loss to the New York Rangers. He scored his first NHL goal on November 7 against goaltender Ed Staniowski in a 7–4 victory over the St. Louis Blues. He registered his first multi-goal game on November 10, scoring two in an 8–4 victory over the Winnipeg Jets. Boschman appeared in all 80 games with the team during the 1979–80 season, scoring 16 goals and 48 points. The Maple Leafs made the 1980 Stanley Cup playoffs and faced the Minnesota North Stars in the opening best-of-five round. In the first game of the series, Boschman scored his first NHL playoff goal on the power play in the first period against Gary Edwards, tying the game at one. However, the Stars would win the game 6–3, though Boschman would add an assist on Ron Wilson's goal, to finish with two points in the game. In three playoff games, Boschman had just the goal and two points, as the Maple Leafs were swept by the North Stars in three games. Boschman became a born again Christian during his rookie year with the support of teammate Ellis who organized Sunday services for the players.

Boschman played four games with the New Brunswick Hawks of the American Hockey League (AHL) in 1980–81, scoring four goals and five points, as well as 47 penalty minutes. During the season Boschman suffered blood poisoning and contracted mononucleosis. The rest of the 1980–81 season was spent with the Maple Leafs, as Boschman scored 14 goals and 33 points, and 178 penalty minutes in 53 games, with the mononucleosis affecting his play. During the season the Maple Leafs replaced the head coach, Joe Crozier, with Mike Nykoluk and Nykoluk made Boschman an alternate captain. The Maple Leafs made the 1981 Stanley Cup playoffs but were knocked out in the first round by the New York Islanders. In three playoff games, Boschman was held off the scoresheet. The 1981–82 season saw a continuation of the previous year's turmoil. The general manager, Imlach, suffered a heart attack and stepped away from the team. This allowed the Maple Leafs' owner, Harold Ballard, to take a larger role. In Imlach's absence, Ballard and Gerry McNamara ran the team. On November 25, 1981, after a 3–3 tie with the New York Rangers, Ballard told journalist Dick Beddoes that he did not like Boschman's play and that Boschman's faith was hurting his game and that he should be demoted to the AHL. Boschman, whose stamina had been affected by the mononucleosis, denied that his beliefs were affecting him negatively. In response, Ballard again criticized Boschman, claiming he became "soft" as a result. However, Boschman's agent, Bill Watters, told the Maple Leafs that Boschman would not be sent to the AHL and that they could play him in Toronto or trade him. In January, Boschman, suffering from a stomach ulcer, was assigned to the Cincinnati Tigers of the Central Hockey League, but never played a game for them. Ballard again criticized Boschman for his injuries claiming that Alan Eagleson was scheming with the player.

=== Edmonton Oilers ===
Later that season, Imlach was fired and McNamara became the new Maple Leafs general manager. As part of McNamara's effort to rebuild the team, Boschman was traded to the Edmonton Oilers for winger Walt Poddubny and prospect Phil Drouillard on March 8, 1982. Boschman made his Oilers debut on March 10 in a 3–2 loss to the Los Angeles Kings. He scored his first goal as an Oiler on March 13 against Rick Heinz in a 5–3 victory over the Vancouver Canucks. He finished the 1981–82 season with the Oilers appearing in 11 games, scoring two goals and five points, as the team won the Smythe Division. In the 1982 Stanley Cup playoffs, he had an assist in three games, as the Oilers were upset by the Los Angeles Kings in the first round of the post-season.

Boschman struggled during the 1982–83 season with the Oilers, scoring eight goals and 20 points in 62 games. He was suspended on February 24, 1983, for three games after leaving the bench to get into a fight on the ice during a game versus the Calgary Flames on February 22 and the team was fined $1,000. On March 7, 1983, Edmonton traded Boschman to the Winnipeg Jets for forward Willy Lindström.

=== Winnipeg Jets ===
Boschman appeared in 12 games with the Winnipeg Jets in the 1982–83 season, scoring three goals and eight points. He made his Jets debut on March 9, 1983, in a 6–0 shutout win over the Buffalo Sabres. He registered his first point with Winnipeg on March 13, assisting on a goal by Scott Arniel in a 4–3 loss to the Los Angeles Kings. Boschman got his first goal with the Jets against Rick St. Croix in the following game on March 18, a 7–3 victory over the Maple Leafs. Winnipeg qualified for the 1983 Stanley Cup playoffs. In three post-season games, Boschman earned an assist in three games, as the Jets were swept by Boschman's former team, the Edmonton Oilers in the Smythe Division semi-finals.

Boschman had a breakout season with the Jets in the 1983–84 season, as he scored 28 goals and 74 points in 61 games, as well as earning 234 penalty minutes. He had his first four-point game on November 4, 1983, against the Toronto Maple Leafs, scoring two goals and registering two assists in an 8–4 victory. His second four-point game came on December 5 where he scored two goals and marked two assists in a 7–5 victory over the Los Angeles Kings. He suffered a dislocated shoulder against the New Jersey Devils on December 7 returning on January 17, 1984, versus the Washington Capitals. He spent the rest of the season in a shoulder harness. After his return, Boschman registered two four-point games in the span of three games, the first in a 5–4 overtime win against the Pittsburgh Penguins on January 18, with Boschman assisting on all but one of the goals and the second in a 6–4 victory over the Vancouver Canucks on January 20, scoring two goals and two assists. The Jets made the 1984 Stanley Cup playoffs but were swept by the Edmonton Oilers for the second consecutive season. In the post-season, Boschman was held to an assist in three games. After the season, Boschman underwent surgery to repair his shoulder.

In the 1984–85 season, Boschman improved on his offensive numbers, scoring 32 goals and 76 points in 80 games, as well as 180 penalty minutes. He scored his first career hat trick against Bob Janecyk in a 9–5 victory over the Los Angeles Kings on November 24, 1984. He added an assist in the game. He had two other four-point games during the season, the first against Washington on February 13, 1985, in a 5–3 victory with a goal and three assists. The line of Boschman, Doug Smail and Jim Nill recorded ten points combined in the game. The second came against New Jersey on March 12 with a goal and three assists in a 6–3 victory. Winnipeg made the 1985 Stanley Cup playoffs, as the Jets defeated the Calgary Flames before being swept by the Edmonton Oilers for the third straight season, this time in the Smythe Division final. In the post-season, Boschman had two goals and three points in eight games.

Boschman had another productive season with the Jets in the 1985–86 season, scoring 27 goals and 69 points in 77 games, and earning a career high 241 penalty minutes. He had a single four-point game that season, scoring two goals and adding two assists against Washington on October 25, 1985, in a 7–7 tie. The Jets qualified for the 1986 Stanley Cup playoffs, but were swept by the Calgary Flames in the first round. In three playoff games, Boschman was held to one assist. In the 1986–87, Boschman saw his offensive numbers decline, as in 80 games, he scored 17 goals and 41 points, his lowest totals since joining the Jets. The Jets qualified for the 1987 Stanley Cup playoffs as Winnipeg defeated the Calgary Flames in the first round, before being swept by the Edmonton Oilers in the Smythe Division final. In ten post-season games, Boschman had two goals and five points.

Boschman appeared in all 80 games with the Jets in the 1987–88 season, scoring 25 goals and 48 points, as well as 229 penalty minutes. He scored his second career hat trick on February 3, 1987, in a 9–0 shutout victory over the Calgary Flames. He scored the first two goals against Mike Vernon in the first period and after Vernon was replaced by Doug Dadswell for the second period, Boschman added his third. The Jets made the 1988 Stanley Cup playoffs only to lose to the Edmonton Oilers again in the first round. In five playoff games, Boschman had a goal and four points. Boschman saw his offense dip during 1988–89 season, as in 70 games, Boschman scored 10 goals and 36 points. He missed time early in the season after blocking a shot with his leg in a game against Edmonton on October 16, 1988. The puck cut him, requiring five stitches to close the wound. He returned to the lineup on November 18 after missing ten games. The team failed to qualify for the 1989 Stanley Cup playoffs. Boschman had his worst season in six seasons due to injuries and lowered production. Rumours of the Jets trading Boschman began during the 1989 offseason.

His offensive game continued to struggle in the 1989–90 season, as in 66 games, Boschman earned 10 goals and 27 points. His name continued to be included in trade rumours during the season. On February 16, 1990, Boschman was suspended for eight games after high-sticking Los Angeles Kings forward Tomas Sandström. Boschman saw his ice time cut as the season wore on and was scratched from the lineup for most of the first round of the 1990 Stanley Cup playoffs. In two playoff games, Boschman was held pointless, only playing after injuries to Doug Smail and Phil Sykes as the Jets lost again to the Edmonton Oilers in the first round. During the 1990 offseason Boschman requested a trade from the Jets. On September 6, 1990, the Jets traded Boschman to the New Jersey Devils for Bob Brooke.

=== New Jersey Devils ===
The acquisition of Boschman was the second trade in as many days by Devils general manager Lou Lamoriello to toughen up the team, previously acquiring Claude Lemieux from the Montreal Canadiens. Boschman made his first appearance with the Devils on opening night, October 4, 1990, in a 3–3 tie with the Detroit Red Wings. He scored his first goal (and his second) in a Devils uniform on October 13 against Mike Vernon in a 5–3 victory over the Calgary Flames. He played on a line with Troy Crowder and Al Stewart. Boschman appeared in 78 games in his first year with the Devils in the 1990–91 season, scoring 11 goals and 20 points and recording 79 penalty minutes; his lowest penalty minute total since his rookie season. The Devils qualified for the post-season and faced the Pittsburgh Penguins in the first round. Boschman was deployed to shadow Penguins' superstar Mario Lemieux and prevent him from having an impact but the Devils were still eliminated. In seven playoff games, Boschman had a goal and two points, as New Jersey lost to the Penguins.

In 75 games with the Devils in the 1991–92 season, Boschman scored eight goals and 28 points and 121 penalty minutes. He played on a line with Pat Conacher and Doug Brown to begin the season and was a key faceoff winner for the team. The Devils made the 1992 Stanley Cup playoffs with their best ever record to date and faced the first-place New York Rangers in the first round. The series went to seven games, and ultimately the Devils lost to the Rangers. In seven playoff games, Boschman had one goal.

=== Ottawa Senators ===
During the offseason, Lamoriello let Boschman know that he was to be exposed in the 1992 NHL expansion draft, but told him that he doubted that Boschman would be selected. However, on June 18, 1992, the Ottawa Senators selected Boschman as one of the team's few true NHL-calibre players. He was named as the first captain in Senators' team history prior to the 1992–93 season. Due to the lack of NHL talent, every player on the team saw their role expand. Boschman played in the Senators' inaugural game on October 8, 1992, a 5–3 victory over the Montreal Canadiens. He scored his first goal for Ottawa on October 27 against Tom Barrasso in a 7–2 loss to the Pittsburgh Penguins. On April 10, 1993, after going 39 games without a victory away from home, Boschman scored the third and final hat trick of his career against Glenn Healy in a 5–3 win to secure the first Ottawa Senators road victory. In 70 games with Ottawa, Boschman had nine goals and 16 points. The Senators failed to make the playoffs and Boschman played his last NHL game on April 14, a 4–2 loss to the Boston Bruins. In the offseason he was left exposed in the 1993 NHL expansion draft by Ottawa, but was not selected. After only one season with the Senators, the club bought out Boschman's contract.

=== Fife Flyers ===
Boschman briefly played with the Fife Flyers of the British Hockey League in the 1994–95 season, scoring nine goals and 18 points in seven games with the team. In six playoff games, Boschman had five goals and 13 points.

== Personal life ==
Boschman currently lives in Stittsville, Ontario, (a part of Ottawa) with his three sons, Brent, Mark and Jeff. His wife, Nancy, died early in 2006. Boschman became the Ottawa and Eastern Ontario director of Hockey Ministries International after retiring, a ministry that combines ice hockey with Christianity. Boschman has been a Christian since his playing days and his relationship with his faith helped inspire teammate Jim Nill to become a Christian.

== Awards ==
- Named to the WHL First All-Star Team (1979)
- Named to the Memorial Cup All-Star Team (1979).
- Won Molson Cup (Three-Stars Leader) for the Winnipeg Jets (1983–84).

== Career statistics ==
			Regular season					Playoffs
Season	Team	League	GP	G	A	Pts	PIM	GP	G	A	Pts	PIM
1975–76	Brandon Travellers	MJHL	2	1	3	4	2	—	—	—	—	—
1976–77	Brandon Travellers	MJHL	47	17	40	57	139	—	—	—	—	—
1976–77	Brandon Wheat Kings	WCJHL	3	0	1	1	0	12	1	1	2	17
1977–78	Brandon Wheat Kings	WCJHL	72	42	57	99	227	6	2	5	7	45
1978–79	Brandon Wheat Kings	WHL	65	66	83	149	215	22	11	23	34	56
1979–80	Toronto Maple Leafs	NHL	80	16	32	48	78	3	1	1	2	18
1980–81	Toronto Maple Leafs	NHL	53	14	19	33	178	3	0	0	0	7
1980–81	New Brunswick Hawks	AHL	4	4	1	5	47	—	—	—	—	—
1981–82	Toronto Maple Leafs	NHL	54	9	19	28	150	—	—	—	—	—
1981–82	Edmonton Oilers	NHL	11	2	3	5	37	3	0	1	1	4
1982–83	Edmonton Oilers	NHL	62	8	12	20	183	—	—	—	—	—
1982–83	Winnipeg Jets	NHL	12	3	5	8	36	3	0	1	1	12
1983–84	Winnipeg Jets	NHL	61	28	46	74	234	3	0	1	1	5
1984–85	Winnipeg Jets	NHL	80	32	44	76	180	8	2	1	3	21
1985–86	Winnipeg Jets	NHL	77	27	42	69	241	3	0	1	1	6
1986–87	Winnipeg Jets	NHL	80	17	24	41	152	10	2	3	5	32
1987–88	Winnipeg Jets	NHL	80	25	23	48	229	5	1	3	4	9
1988–89	Winnipeg Jets	NHL	70	10	26	36	163	—	—	—	—	—
1989–90	Winnipeg Jets	NHL	66	10	17	27	103	2	0	0	0	2
1990–91	New Jersey Devils	NHL	78	11	9	20	79	7	1	1	2	16
1991–92	New Jersey Devils	NHL	75	8	20	28	121	7	1	0	1	8
1992–93	Ottawa Senators	NHL	70	9	7	16	101	—	—	—	—	—
1994–95	Fife Flyers	BHL	7	9	9	18	6	6	5	8	13	12
NHL totals			1,009	229	348	577	2,265	57	8	13	21	140

== See also ==
- List of NHL players with 1,000 games played
- List of NHL players with 2,000 career penalty minutes

Preceded by Trevor Johansen	Toronto Maple Leafs first-round draft pick 1979	Succeeded by Jim Benning
Preceded by Position created	Ottawa Senators captain 1992–93	Succeeded by Mark Lamb; Brad Shaw
