= Mark Lamb =

Canadian ice hockey player

- Born: August 3, 1964 (age 62) Ponteix, Saskatchewan, Canada
- Height: 6 ft 2 in (188 cm)
- Weight: 220 lb (100 kg; 15 st 10 lb)
- Position: Centre
- Shot: Left
- Played for: Calgary Flames; Detroit Red Wings; Edmonton Oilers; Ottawa Senators; Philadelphia Flyers; Montreal Canadiens
- NHL draft: 72nd overall, 1982; Calgary Flames
- Playing career: 1984–2000

Mark William Lamb (born August 3, 1964) is a Canadian former professional ice hockey player, and current general manager and head coach of the Prince George Cougars of the Western Hockey League (WHL). Lamb was previously the head coach of the Tucson Roadrunners of the American Hockey League (AHL) and the Swift Current Broncos of the WHL. Lamb was born in Ponteix, Saskatchewan but grew up in Swift Current, Saskatchewan. As an ice hockey player, he played for the Calgary Flames, Detroit Red Wings, Edmonton Oilers, Ottawa Senators, Philadelphia Flyers and Montreal Canadiens of the National Hockey League (NHL). He won the NHL's Stanley Cup in 1990 with the Edmonton Oilers, and co-captained the Ottawa Senators in 1993–94. Lamb also won the International Hockey League's Turner Cup with the Houston Aeros in 1999.

== Playing career ==
=== Junior career ===
Lamb split his first season in junior hockey with the Swift Current Broncos of the Saskatchewan Junior Hockey League and the Billings Bighorns of the Western Hockey League (WHL). Lamb scored 13 goals and 58 points in 40 games with Swift Current and one goal and nine points in 24 games with Billings. The Bighorns made the playoffs but were eliminated by the Calgary Wranglers in the first round. Lamb registered one point (an assist) in three playoff games. Known as a "pesky center" Lamb played in his first full season in the WHL during the 1981–82 season with Billings. He registered 45 goals and 101 points in 72 games that season. The team made the playoffs but were again knocked out in the first round, this time by the Lethbridge Broncos.

The Bighorns were sold and moved to become the Nanaimo Islanders for the 1982–83 season. Lamb began the season in Nanaimo, scoring 14 goals and 51 points in 30 games. However, after management changes in December, Lamb was asked if he would liked to be traded and he agreed. Lamb was sent to the Medicine Hat Tigers for goaltender Daryl Reaugh and defenceman Glenn Kulka on December 9, 1982. There, he rejoined Russ Farwell, the general manager of the Tigers, who had been Lamb's coach in Billings the previous season. Lamb scored 22 goals and 65 points in 46 games with Medicine Hat. The Tigers made the playoffs, but lost to the Calgary Wranglers in the first round. Lamb registered three goals and five points in the five games.

In his first full season with Medicine Hat in the 1983–84 season, Lamb played in 72 games, scoring 59 goals and 136 points. The Tigers made the playoffs and beat the Prince Albert Raiders in the first round. Medicine Hat made it to the Eastern Division final where they lost to the Regina Pats. Lamb added 12 goals and 23 points in the Tigers' 14-game playoffs. Lamb was awarded the Frank Boucher Memorial Trophy as the WHL's most gentlemanly player. He was also named to the East Division First All-Star Team. Though he spent the majority of the 1984–85 WHL season playing professionally, Lamb was still eligible to play in the WHL. He was added to the Tigers' roster on February 10 and played in their playoff series against Prince Albert. The Tigers were eliminated by the Raiders, and Lamb scored three goals and five points in six games. However, Lamb and Dale Derkatch, who had also returned to junior to play for the Pats, led to opposition to the overage rule in junior hockey. The rule was changed to prevent what had happened with Lamb and Derkatch, forcing overage North American players to be returned to their junior teams by January in future seasons.

=== Professional career ===
==== Calgary and Detroit ====
Lamb was drafted by the Calgary Flames of the National Hockey League (NHL) in the fourth round, 72nd overall, in the 1982 NHL entry draft. Lamb made his professional debut with Calgary's affiliate, the Colorado Flames of the Central Hockey League, during their playoff run in April 1983. Lamb appeared in six playoff games with Colorado, registering two points (both assists). Lamb, along with Joel Otto, Gino Cavallini, and Mike Vernon, was assigned to the Flames' American Hockey League (AHL) affiliate, the Moncton Golden Flames, to begin the 1984–85 season after Colorado folded. Lamb appeared in 80 games with Moncton, scoring 23 goals and 72 points. Lamb returned to Moncton for the 1985–86 season. He played in 79 games, scoring 26 goals and 76 points. He was recalled to Calgary along with Vernon and Neil Sheehy in an attempt to shake up the Flames' lineup in January while the team was going through a slump. Lamb made his NHL debut on January 9 in Calgary's 5–4 overtime victory over the Vancouver Canucks. Lamb was returned to Moncton on January 10 after the one appearance. The Golden Flames made the AHL playoffs and got to the second round. However, Lamb broke his toe blocking a shot in the final game of the series that they lost to the Adirondack Red Wings. In ten playoff games, Lamb scored two goals and eight points.

Lamb signed with Adirondack as a free agent on July 28, 1986. Lamb began the 1986–87 season with Adirondack and played in 49 games with them, registering 14 goals and 50 points. After injuries to three Detroit Red Wings, Lamb was recalled to the NHL along with Dale Krentz on January 16, 1987. He made his Red Wings debut on January 17 in a 3–2 win over the Quebec Nordiques. He centred a line between Bob Probert and Ric Seiling. Lamb registered his first NHL point assisting on Dave Lewis' goal in the third period of a 4–2 victory over the Toronto Maple Leafs on January 31. He scored his first NHL goal in the next game on February 1 on Tom Barrasso in the third period of a 6–1 defeat to the Buffalo Sabres. He was returned to Adirondack on March 16 but recalled again by Detroit on April 2 after injuries to Ric Seiling and Billy Carroll. He finished the season with two goals and three points in 22 games with Detroit. He remained with Detroit into the 1987 Stanley Cup playoffs and appeared in 11 playoff games, going scoreless.

==== Edmonton Oilers ====
At the beginning of the 1987–88 NHL season, Lamb was left unprotected by the Red Wings in the NHL waiver draft. He was claimed by the Edmonton Oilers on October 5, 1987, with the 19th, and last transaction, in the draft. He began the season in Edmonton and made his Oilers debut on October 16 in a 5–2 victory over the Calgary Flames. He played in the following game against the Boston Bruins which the Oilers won 4–3. He played only the two games, going scoreless, in the first month of the season before being sent down to the Oilers' AHL affiliate, the Nova Scotia Oilers, on November 5. He remained with Nova Scotia for the remainder of the season, scoring 27 goals and 88 points in 69 games. He added five points (all assists) in Nova Scotia's five-game playoff run. Lamb split the 1988–89 season between Edmonton and the Cape Breton Oilers. (Note: The Nova Scotia Oilers played in Halifax, Nova Scotia. During the 1988 offseason, the franchise was relocated to Sydney, Nova Scotia and renamed the Cape Breton Oilers.) Lamb began the season in Cape Breton and bounced back and forth to Edmonton beginning in January 1989. He was recalled for the first time on January 18 and played that night against the Winnipeg Jets, scoring his first goal for the Oilers in the third period of the 9–4 victory. He played in 20 games with Edmonton, scoring two goals and 10 points and 54 games with Cape Breton, scoring 33 goals and 82 points. Lamb also appeared in six playoff games with Edmonton, registering two points.

For the 1989–90 season Lamb made the Oilers out of training camp, playing on a line with Jari Kurri and Esa Tikkanen. Lamb had his first multi-point game of his NHL career on October 18, 1989, registering a goal and an assist in a 7–2 victory over the Winnipeg Jets. He marked his first multi-goal game in the NHL with two goals against Brian Hayward in a 5–4 loss to the Montreal Canadiens on October 29. Beginning in January 1990, Vladimír Růžička joined the Oilers from Europe, taking Lamb's spot between Tikkanen and Kurri and keeping Lamb out of the lineup. Lamb played 58 games with the Oilers, scoring 12 goals and 28 points. The Oilers made the 1990 Stanley Cup playoffs and faced the Winnipeg Jets in the first round. In the second game of the series, Lamb who started on the fourth line, was moved up the lineup after Craig MacTavish was given a game misconduct penalty and removed from the game. He assisted on Joe Murphy's game-tying goal and then won the game in overtime beating Stéphane Beauregard on a breakaway. He then scored the game-winning goal in a 4–1 win over the Jets in game seven to win the series. Lamb and the Oilers then beat the Los Angeles Kings and Chicago Blackhawks, before winning the Stanley Cup four-games-to one over the Boston Bruins. Lamb registered six goals and 17 points in 22 games during the playoffs.

Lamb began the 1990–91 season as one of the Oilers' best role players. However, Lamb was in and out of the lineup for most of the season. He appeared in 37 games with the Oilers, scoring four goals and 12 points. The Oilers made the 1991 Stanley Cup playoffs, and in the second round versus the Los Angeles Kings, Lamb strained his shoulder in the second period of the series-clinching win on April 28 after receiving a hit from Tomas Sandström. He did not return to the game. He played in the first game of the third round series versus the Minnesota North Stars, but was taken out of the lineup starting in game two due to the injury, replaced by Ken Linseman. He returned to the lineup for game 4 but was scratched again for the fifth game in which the North Stars eliminated the Oilers. He finished the playoffs with 15 games played, registering just five points (all assists). The 1991–92 season began much of the same for Lamb. He was in and out of the lineup, but eventually saw more consistent time, enough to play in 59 games with the Oilers, scoring six goals and 28 points. The Oilers made the 1992 Stanley Cup playoffs but were eliminated in the third round again, this time by the Chicago Blackhawks. Lamb had one goal and two points in 16 games in the playoffs.

==== Ottawa Senators ====
Lamb was left unprotected by the Oilers in the 1992 NHL expansion draft. On June 18, he was selected by the Ottawa Senators. In the team's inaugural season in 1992–93, Lamb played as the team's number one centre, as every player on the team saw their role expand. He registered his first point in a Senators uniform in their first ever game, an assist on Ken Hammond's second period goal in a 5–3 win over the Montreal Canadiens on October 8. On December 17, Lamb injured a nerve in his neck in a game versus the New York Islanders. Lamb returned to the lineup on January 12, 1993, and scored his first goal of the season in a 3–2 loss to the Los Angeles Kings. He played in 71 games for the Senators, scoring seven goals and 26 points.

Prior to the 1993–94 season, Lamb informed the Senators that he intended to play out the option year on his contract and become a free agent at season's end. He served as the team's co-captain alongside Brad Shaw to start the season. He was regarded as the team's best defensive player. However, Lamb grew frustrated with his uncertain future in Ottawa and with Senators' general manager Randy Sexton. By March 1994 Lamb grew so frustrated, his agent, Don Meehan, issued an ultimatum demanding a trade and refused to consider any return to Ottawa for the next season. He played in 66 games with the Senators, registering 11 goals and 29 points.

==== Philadelphia and Montreal ====
On March 5, 1994, Lamb was traded to the Philadelphia Flyers for forward Claude Boivin and prospect goaltender Kirk Daubenspeck. The Flyers were in a playoff battle and sought reinforcement. The Flyers' general manager, Russ Farwell, knew Lamb from junior. Lamb made his Flyers' debut on March 6 in a 3–1 victory over the Tampa Bay Lightning. He scored his first goal as a Flyer in the game in the third period on Darren Puppa. Despite Lamb's addition, the Flyers missed the playoffs. Lamb finished the season with the Flyers, playing 19 games, scoring the one goal and seven points. During the lockout-shortened 1994–95 season, Lamb played eight games for the Flyers, registering two points (both assists) before being traded to the Montreal Canadiens. Lamb was initially part of the trade between the two teams that saw John LeClair, Éric Desjardins, Gilbert Dionne, and Mark Recchi swap jerseys on February 9. However, at the last minute his name was withdrawn and replaced with a third round draft pick. He was even reported to have been part of the trade by some outlets. Lamb was in fact, traded to Montreal for cash on February 11, with the transaction coinciding with the Flyers claiming Jim Montgomery off waivers from the Canadiens on the same day, leading some to record the transactions as the trade.

Lamb made his Canadiens' debut on February 11 in a 3–1 loss to the Pittsburgh Penguins playing on a line with Turner Stevenson and Donald Brashear. He scored his first goal with Montreal against Mike Richter on February 18 in a 5–2 victory over the New York Rangers. He finished the season playing in 39 games for Montreal, scoring one goal. He played one game for the Canadiens, his final NHL game, in the 1995–96 season on October 14, a 4–1 loss to the New Jersey Devils. In total, Lamb played 403 regular season games in the NHL, scoring 46 goals and 100 assists for 146 points.

==== IHL and Germany ====
On October 25, 1995, Lamb was assigned to Montreal's AHL affiliate, the Fredericton Canadiens after Marc Bureau returned from injury. However, he never played a game for Fredericton and instead was loaned to the Houston Aeros of the International Hockey League (IHL) in November for the remainder of the season. He played in 67 games with Houston, scoring 17 goals and 77 points. He re-signed with Houston on September 13, 1996, and played in 81 games, scoring 25 goals and 78 points. He appeared in 13 games in the playoffs, adding three goals and 15 points.

In June 1997, Lamb signed with EV Landshut of the Deutsche Eishockey Liga in Germany. He spent one season there, scoring seven goals and 28 points in 41 games. He returned to North America and tried out for the Edmonton Oilers at their 1998 training camp, but failed to make the team. He returned to Houston where he was a player-coach. In 79 games during the 1998–99 season, Lamb scored 21 goals and 70 points. The Aeros made the playoffs and in 19 games, he added one goal and 11 points. Lamb and the Aeros won the Turner Cup as IHL champions that season, and were the first team to win the championship after playing every possible playoff game. Lamb returned for one more season with Houston in the 1999–2000 season, scoring 15 goals and 61 points in 79 games. He added two goals and nine points in 11 playoff games. He retired in the offseason and joined the Edmonton Oilers as an assistant coach.

== Coaching and manager career ==
In 2000 Lamb returned to Edmonton as a player development coach under head coach Craig MacTavish. In 2002, Lamb moved to the Dallas Stars under head coach Dave Tippett as an assistant coach. He spent six years with Dallas, but following the 2008–09 season which saw the Stars finish out of the playoffs, Tippett and Lamb were fired. Lamb then became the head coach and general manager of the WHL's Swift Current Broncos from 2009 to 2016.

On June 21, 2016, Lamb was named head coach to the Tucson Roadrunners, the AHL affiliate of the Arizona Coyotes. In his only season with Tucson, Lamb had a record of 29 wins, 39 losses and 8 overtime losses, collecting 66 points. He was fired along with Roadrunners' general manager Doug Soetaert at the end of the season.

In 2018, he was hired as the general manager of the Prince George Cougars in the WHL, and was elevated to the head coaching position a year later. In 2024, Lamb was named the WHL coach and executive of the year.

== Career statistics ==
			Regular season					Playoffs
Season	Team	League	GP	G	A	Pts	PIM	GP	G	A	Pts	PIM
1980–81	Swift Current Broncos	SJHL	—	—	—	—	—	—	—	—	—	—
1980–81	Billings Bighorns	WHL	24	1	8	9	12	3	0	1	1	0
1981–82	Billings Bighorns	WHL	72	45	56	101	46	5	4	6	10	4
1982–83	Colorado Flames	CHL	—	—	—	—	—	6	0	2	2	0
1982–83	Medicine Hat Tigers	WHL	46	22	43	65	33	5	3	2	5	4
1982–83	Nanaimo Islanders	WHL	30	14	37	51	16	—	—	—	—	—
1983–84	Medicine Hat Tigers	WHL	72	59	77	136	30	14	12	11	23	6
1984–85	Moncton Golden Flames	AHL	80	23	49	72	53	—	—	—	—	—
1984–85	Medicine Hat Tigers	WHL	—	—	—	—	—	6	3	2	5	2
1985–86	Calgary Flames	NHL	1	0	0	0	0	—	—	—	—	—
1985–86	Moncton Golden Flames	AHL	79	26	50	76	51	10	2	6	8	17
1986–87	Adirondack Red Wings	AHL	49	14	36	50	45	—	—	—	—	—
1986–87	Detroit Red Wings	NHL	22	2	1	3	8	11	0	0	0	11
1987–88	Edmonton Oilers	NHL	2	0	0	0	0	—	—	—	—	—
1987–88	Nova Scotia Oilers	AHL	69	27	61	88	45	5	0	5	5	6
1988–89	Cape Breton Oilers	AHL	54	33	49	82	29	—	—	—	—	—
1988–89	Edmonton Oilers	NHL	20	2	8	10	14	6	0	2	2	8
1989–90	Edmonton Oilers	NHL	58	12	16	28	42	22	6	11	17	2
1990–91	Edmonton Oilers	NHL	37	4	8	12	25	15	0	5	5	20
1991–92	Edmonton Oilers	NHL	59	6	22	28	46	16	1	1	2	10
1992–93	Ottawa Senators	NHL	71	7	19	26	64	—	—	—	—	—
1993–94	Ottawa Senators	NHL	66	11	18	29	56	—	—	—	—	—
1993–94	Philadelphia Flyers	NHL	19	1	6	7	16	—	—	—	—	—
1994–95	Philadelphia Flyers	NHL	8	0	2	2	2	—	—	—	—	—
1994–95	Montreal Canadiens	NHL	39	1	0	1	18	—	—	—	—	—
1995–96	Montreal Canadiens	NHL	1	0	0	0	0	—	—	—	—	—
1995–96	Houston Aeros	IHL	67	17	60	77	65	—	—	—	—	—
1996–97	Houston Aeros	IHL	81	25	53	78	83	13	3	12	15	10
1997–98	Landshut EV	DEL	46	7	21	28	36	6	3	1	4	8
1998–99	Houston Aeros	IHL	79	21	49	70	72	19	1	10	11	12
1999–2000	Houston Aeros	IHL	79	15	46	61	58	11	2	7	9	6
AHL totals			331	123	245	368	223	15	2	11	13	23
NHL totals			403	46	100	146	291	70	7	19	26	51
IHL totals			306	78	208	286	278	43	6	29	35	28

== Coaching statistics ==
Team	Year	League	Regular season							Postseason
Team	Year	League	G	W	L	T	OTL	Pts	Finish	Result
SC	2009–10	WHL	72	37	30	1	4	79	3rd in East	Lost in First round
SC	2010–11	WHL	72	26	44	0	2	54	6th in East	Out of playoffs
SC	2011–12	WHL	72	27	37	2	6	62	5th in East	Out of playoffs
SC	2012–13	WHL	72	36	29	3	4	79	3rd in East	Lost in First round
SC	2013–14	WHL	72	38	25	3	6	85	2nd in East	Lost in First round
SC	2014–15	WHL	72	33	34	1	4	73	3rd in East	Lost in First round
SC	2015–16	WHL	72	24	38	7	3	58	5th in East	Out of playoffs
SC totals			432	221	237	17	29	394		
PG	2019–20	WHL	62	20	34	4	4	48	5th in B.C.	Season cancelled due to COVID-19 pandemic
PG	2020–21	WHL	22	9	10	2	1	21	no standings (Note: The 2020–21 WHL regular season was shortened, started late, then was cancelled early, and no playoffs were held, due to the ongoing COVID-19 pandemic. The Prince George Cougars were in a mathematical position to finish anywhere from third to fifth in the B.C. Division when the season was cancelled.)	no playoffs
PG	2021–22	WHL	68	24	39	4	1	53	3rd in B.C.	Lost in First round
PG	2022–23	WHL	68	37	24	6	1	81	2nd in B.C.	Lost in Second round
PG	2023–24	WHL	68	41	15	1	4	102	1st in B.C.	Lost in Western Conference Finals
PG totals			288	131	122	17	11	305		
WHL totals			720	342	359	34	40	699		

== Awards and honours ==
Award	Year
Western Hockey League
East First All-Star Team	1984
Frank Boucher Memorial Trophy	1984
Lloyd Saunders Memorial Trophy (Executive of the Year)	2024
National Hockey League
Stanley Cup championship	1990
International Hockey League
Turner Cup championship	1999

== Citations ==
Preceded by Laurie Boschman	Ottawa Senators captain 1993–94 with Brad Shaw	Succeeded by Gord Dineen
