= John Druce =

Canadian ice hockey player (born 1966)

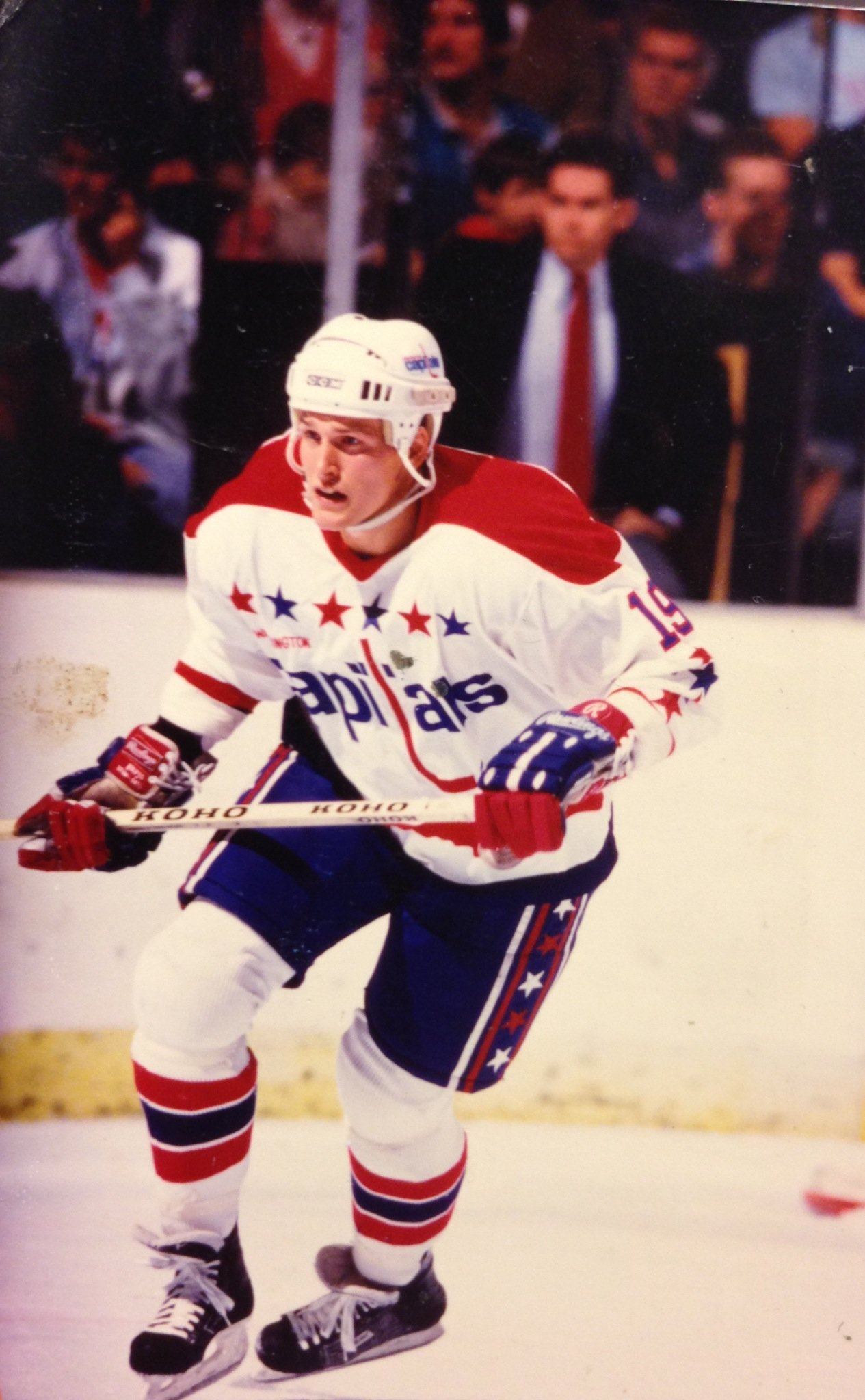
- Druce with the Washington Capitals
- Born: February 23, 1966 (age 60) Peterborough, Ontario, Canada
- Height: 6 ft 2 in (188 cm)
- Weight: 215 lb (98 kg; 15 st 5 lb)
- Position: Right wing
- Shot: Right
- Played for: Washington Capitals; Winnipeg Jets; Los Angeles Kings; Philadelphia Flyers
- NHL draft: 40th overall, 1985; Washington Capitals
- Playing career: 1986–2000

John W. Druce (born February 23, 1966) is a Canadian former professional ice hockey right winger who played in the National Hockey League (NHL) for the Washington Capitals, Winnipeg Jets, Los Angeles Kings and Philadelphia Flyers

== Playing career ==
As a youth, he played in the 1979 Quebec International Pee-Wee Hockey Tournament with a minor ice hockey team from Peterborough.

In Druce's first year of Junior eligibility, he played for the Peterborough Petes B squad. He joined the Petes the next season and scored 12 goals in 54 games. Druce was on a checking line with future Capital teammate Rob Murray.

Drafted in 1985 by the Washington Capitals in the second round (40th overall), Druce had a couple of modest seasons before scoring 32 goals for the Binghamton Whalers of the AHL in 1987-88 season. He did not make the Capitals roster until the 1988–89 NHL season, where he was usually a fourth-line defensive specialist.

During the 1989–90 NHL season, his regular season statistics continued to be unspectacular (8 goals in 45 games), but during the playoffs he exploded for 14 goals as the Capitals made their first ever Conference Finals. His fourteen goals was a franchise record for one postseason until 2018. In the division semifinals versus the New Jersey Devils, Druce scored three goals in the six game series won by Washington, including two game winners. In the division finals versus the New York Rangers, with Dino Ciccarelli injured in Game 2 that saw him knocked out for the rest of the playoffs, Druce provided crucial offensive production with nine goals, which set a franchise record for goals in one playoff series. In game two of the series, Druce scored a hat trick, his first since midget hockey. Game three saw Druce tally two more goals and two assists. Druce scored two goals in game four to lead the Capitals to a three games to one lead. In overtime of game five, Druce fended off a check by Ron Greschner and deflected Geoff Courtnall's shot over goalie John Vanbiesbrouck for a 2-1 series winning victory. Capitals general manager David Poile said, "John Druce was not on the top of my list—anybody's list—to come through the way he did. He came out of nowhere to be the hero." Poile added, "He was not a top player in junior, not a top player in the minors. This is not only a good story today, but a good story for years to come."

At the time, Druce's total of nine goals in a playoff series put him in a five-way tie for third on the all-time list for goals scored in a playoff series, behind Jari Kurri (with 12, for the Edmonton Oilers in 1985) and Tim Kerr (with 10, for the Philadelphia Flyers in 1989). It remains a Capitals record for most goals in a playoff series.

Druce was unable to recapture that playoff magic by the time he was traded to the Winnipeg Jets in 1992. He also played for the Los Angeles Kings and Philadelphia Flyers, and he appeared in the 1997 Stanley Cup finals with the Flyers team that took on the Detroit Red Wings. He also played two seasons in the Deutsche Eishockey Liga before retiring from active play.

In 531 NHL games, Druce scored 113 goals and 126 assists.

== Post-retirement ==
After playing, Druce became a junior hockey analyst on Rogers Sportsnet. In 2004, his daughter, Courtney, was diagnosed with leukemia. She relapsed with the disease twice but had been in remission since 2008.

In March 2016, Courtney lost her fifth fight with cancer which she battled for over 12 years, after beating leukemia three times and a rare form of cervical cancer once. She has inspired many with her bravery and her openness regarding all aspects of fighting against this disease.

Druce was then inspired to join a cycling team to raise money for pediatric cancer research. In 2010, Druce was made an honorary constable of the Peterborough Lakefield Community Police Service, for his contributions to the Pedal For Hope in helping them surpass $1M. He currently works for Freedom 55 Financial in Peterborough.

Each year when the playoffs begin, Druce receives media inquiries due to his performance with the Capitals. He says:

Originally I was very proud of what happened there, but I played 14 years of professional hockey, so I thought, 'Jeez, I did more than that.' I've come to realize that's kind of my calling card. I'm very proud of it, and this time of year comes around and it's nice.

== Career statistics ==
			Regular season					Playoffs
Season	Team	League	GP	G	A	Pts	PIM	GP	G	A	Pts	PIM
1983–84	Peterborough Legionnaires	OMHA	40	15	18	33	69	—	—	—	—	—
1983–84	Peterborough Petes	OHL	1	0	0	0	0	—	—	—	—	—
1984–85	Peterborough Petes	OHL	54	12	14	26	90	17	6	2	8	21
1985–86	Peterborough Petes	OHL	49	22	24	46	84	16	0	5	5	34
1986–87	Binghamton Whalers	AHL	77	13	9	22	131	12	0	3	3	28
1987–88	Binghamton Whalers	AHL	68	32	29	61	82	1	0	0	0	0
1988–89	Baltimore Skipjacks	AHL	16	2	11	13	10	—	—	—	—	—
1988–89	Washington Capitals	NHL	48	8	7	15	62	1	0	0	0	0
1989–90	Baltimore Skipjacks	AHL	26	15	16	31	38	—	—	—	—	—
1989–90	Washington Capitals	NHL	45	8	3	11	52	15	14	3	17	23
1990–91	Washington Capitals	NHL	80	22	36	58	46	11	1	1	2	7
1991–92	Washington Capitals	NHL	67	19	18	37	39	7	1	0	1	2
1992–93	Winnipeg Jets	NHL	50	6	14	20	37	2	0	0	0	0
1993–94	Phoenix Roadrunners	IHL	8	5	6	11	9	—	—	—	—	—
1993–94	Los Angeles Kings	NHL	55	14	17	31	50	—	—	—	—	—
1994–95	Los Angeles Kings	NHL	43	15	5	20	20	—	—	—	—	—
1995–96	Los Angeles Kings	NHL	64	9	12	21	14	—	—	—	—	—
1995–96	Philadelphia Flyers	NHL	13	4	4	8	13	2	0	2	2	2
1996–97	Philadelphia Flyers	NHL	43	7	8	15	12	13	1	0	1	2
1997–98	Philadelphia Flyers	NHL	23	1	2	3	2	2	0	0	0	2
1997–98	Philadelphia Phantoms	AHL	39	21	28	49	45	—	—	—	—	—
1998–99	Hannover Scorpions	DEL	36	15	7	22	34	—	—	—	—	—
1999–00	Augsburger Panther	DEL	12	2	0	2	47	3	0	0	0	4
AHL totals			226	83	93	176	306	13	0	3	3	28
NHL totals			531	113	126	239	347	53	17	6	23	38
