= Bernie Nicholls =

Canadian ice hockey player (born 1961)

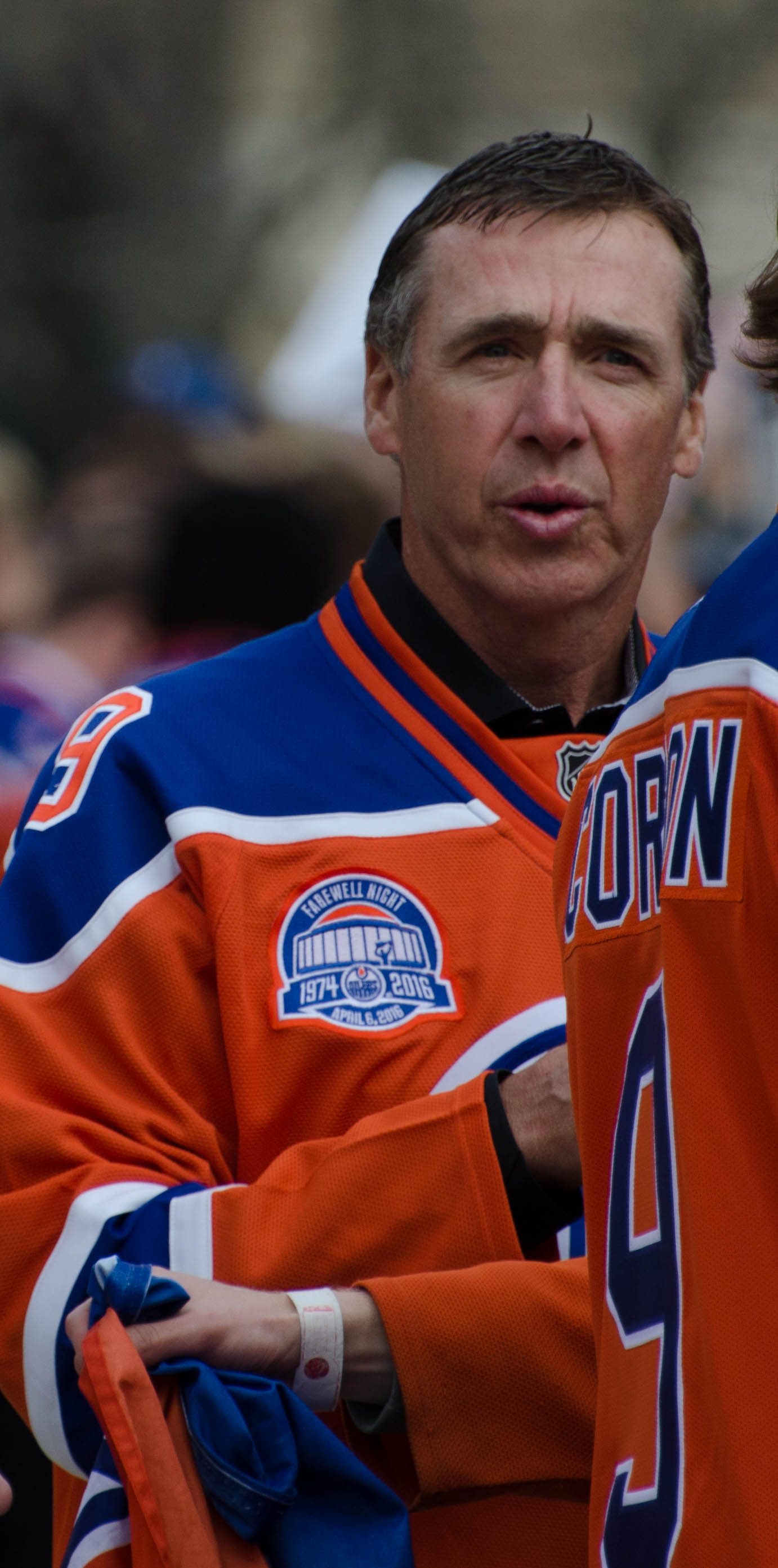
- Nicholls in 2016
- Born: June 24, 1961 (age 65) Haliburton, Ontario, Canada
- Height: 6 ft 0 in (183 cm)
- Weight: 185 lb (84 kg; 13 st 3 lb)
- Position: Centre
- Shot: Right
- Played for: Los Angeles Kings; New York Rangers; Edmonton Oilers; New Jersey Devils; Chicago Blackhawks; San Jose Sharks
- National team: Canada
- NHL draft: 73rd overall, 1980; Los Angeles Kings
- Playing career: 1981–1999

Bernard Irvine Nicholls (born June 24, 1961) is a Canadian former professional ice hockey centre. He played in the National Hockey League (NHL) for the Los Angeles Kings, New York Rangers, Edmonton Oilers, New Jersey Devils, Chicago Blackhawks, and San Jose Sharks from 1981 to 1999.

Born in Haliburton, Ontario, Nicholls played hockey from the age of four and excelled in amateur leagues before he was drafted in the fourth round of the 1980 NHL draft by the Los Angeles Kings. After a record-setting season for the Kingston Canadians in the Ontario Major Junior Hockey League with over 60 goals, Nicholls signed a contract with the Kings, who did not promote him to the NHL until February 1982. Playing 22 games that year, he recorded fourteen goals and eighteen assists as he stayed in the major leagues for good. The 1983–84 season saw Nicholls record 41 goals to lead the team in goals as the fourth player with a 40-goal season. The 1984–85 season saw him record his first 100-point season on the heels of a 25-game scoring streak to go along with being the first player to score a goal in every regulation period and overtime. After five straight 75-point seasons, Nicholls, moved to the second-line at center with the acquisition of Wayne Gretzky in the offseason, had his peak with the 1988–89 season that saw him score 70 goals to go with 150 points to make him the eighth (and currently last) player with 70 goals and 150 points in one season.

In the middle of the 1989–90 season, having recorded 75 points in 47 games, Nicholls was traded to the New York Rangers, where he recorded 37 points in 32 games for his final 100-point season. In his only full season with the Rangers the following years, he recorded 73 points in 71 games before being traded after one game into the 1991–92 season. Honing his skills to be more of a defensive forward in his later years, Nicholls reached the Conference Finals with the Oilers, Devils, and Blackhawks but lost each time. Nicholls became the 39th player to reach 1,000 career points in 1994 with the Devils. He closed his career with the San Jose Sharks as a checking center for the fourth line before being cut in November of the 1998–99 season. In 1,127 games, Nicholls recorded 475 goals with 734 assists for a total of 1,209 points, which at the time was 27th most in league history. He currently has the most points of all eligible players that is not in the Hockey Hall of Fame.

In 2011, Nicholls joined the Los Angeles Kings as a coaching consultant and was on the staff when the team won the 2012 Stanley Cup Final, which earned Nicholls a Stanley Cup ring.

== Early life ==
Nicholls was born on June 24, 1961, in West Guilford, a municipality within Haliburton, Ontario. He was one of five children born to parents George and Marjorie Nicholls. While growing up in the small town, Nicholls was taught to hunt and skate by his father, who built a community rink behind the town schoolhouse. Since he was born pigeon toed, Nicholls wore corrective braces when he was a toddler. He began playing ice hockey at four years old alongside older boys from the area, including future NHL-er Ron Stackhouse. Beyond hockey, Nicholls also played quarterback, golf, and shortstop in fastball.

In 2021, he was inducted into the Haliburton Highlands Sports Hall of Fame.

== Playing career ==
=== Amateur ===
Nicholls played with the Junior D Haliburton Huskies from 1975 to 1977, before joining the Junior B Woodstock Navy Vets in Woodstock, Ontario. During his sole season with the Vets, Nicholls set a franchise rookie record with 41 goals and 79 points through 40 games. In 1978, Nicholls was drafted by the Kingston Canadians of the Ontario Major Junior Hockey League (OMJHL). As a rookie with the Canadians, Nicholls led all rookies in scoring with 36 goals and 79 points. Following his rookie season, Nicholls was drafted in the fourth round of the 1980 NHL entry draft by the Los Angeles Kings. Although numerous scouts were concerned about his skating, Wren Blair advised the Kings to draft him.

Nicholls returned to the Canadians for the 1980–81 season and set numerous new single-season franchise scoring records. He started the season with 14 points over five games while playing alongside Justin Hanley and Scotty Howson. He was then named the league's Player of the Week on November 17 after scoring four goals and 10 assists through four games. Nicholls maintained his scoring streak throughout February and moved into fourth place in the league's scoring race. He scored his 50th goal of the season and 200th career point later that month against the London Knights. On February 26, Nicholls broke Tony McKegney's franchise record for most points in a single season. He finished the regular season with a franchise-record 63 goals, 89 assists, and 152 total points. During the regular-season, Nicholls signed a two-year contract with the Los Angeles Kings.

=== Los Angeles Kings ===
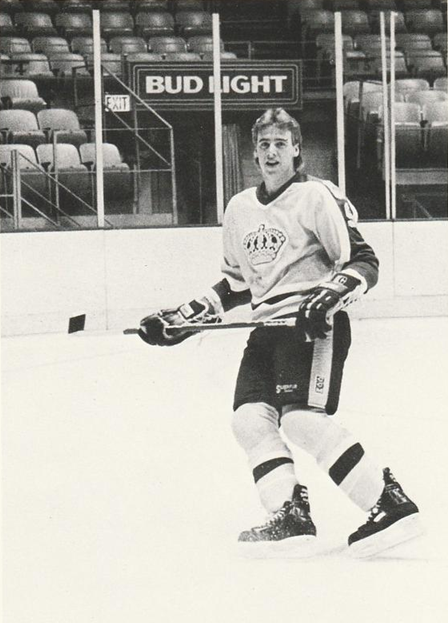
Nicholls with the Los Angeles Kings in 1986

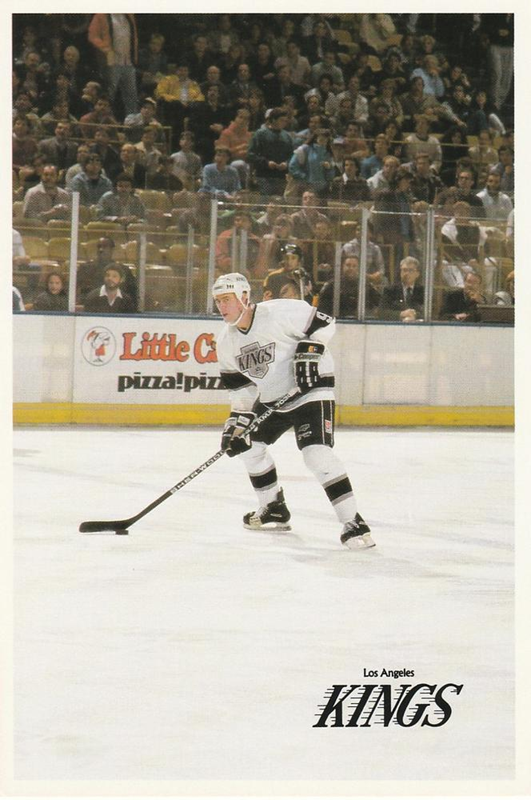
1988 postcard of Nicholls

Nicholls arrived at the Kings' 1981 training camp overweight and out of shape. As such, he was assigned to their American Hockey League (AHL), the New Haven Nighthawks, to start the 1981–82 season. After a slow start to the season, Nicholls led the league in scoring with 41 goals through 55 games. The Kings, however, were struggling to win games and eventually replaced their head coach on January 11. As their new head coach, Don Perry made significant changes to their lineup and worked to allow younger players more chances. Nicholls was called up to the NHL on February 18, 1982, as the Kings were experiencing a five-game losing streak. He scored his first two career NHL goals in his ninth NHL game on March 9, against the Colorado Rockies. He continued to score at a rapid pace throughout the month and recorded three hat-tricks through three consecutive home games. He scored his first career NHL hat-trick on March 17 against the Calgary Flames and his second hat-trick on March 21 against the Pittsburgh Penguins. Nicholls' final hat-trick of the month occurred on March 28 against the Colorado Rockies. He finished the regular-season with 14 goals and 18 assists through 22 games and helped the Kings qualify for the 1982 Stanley Cup playoffs.

As he had only played in 22 games the previous year, Nicholls still maintained his rookie status upon returning for the 1982–83 season. After opening the season without a point, Nicholls experienced a seven-game point streak between October 9 and October 23. By November 8, Nicholls led all rookies in scoring with 21 points and was an early favourite to win the Calder Memorial Trophy as the NHL's Rookie of the Year. However, he suffered a knee injury in mid-November and was expected to miss four weeks to recover. At the time, he led the team in scoring and all rookies in points. Nicholls missed only eight games due to the injury and returned a week early on December 9. However, head coach Don Perry was critical of Nicholls in his first game back and theorised that he came back before he was ready. Both Nicholls and the Kings struggled the remainder of the season, and USA Today sportswriter Rod Beaton attributed the team’s failure to qualify for the 1983 Stanley Cup playoffs to Nicholls’s performance. After returning from his knee injury, Nicholls recorded only 12 goals and 14 assists for 26 points in 52 games.

The Los Angeles Kings started the 1983–84 season with a six-game losing streak. Nicholls helped break the streak while also tying a franchise record by scoring four goals and six points on October 21 against the Edmonton Oilers. Head coach Don Perry praised Nicholls' attitude, saying "Bernie (Nicholls) has done a complete turnaround, both on and off the ice this year. He's become a team leader now." Nicholls led the team in scoring through November while consistently playing alongside Jimmy Fox and Brian MacLellan. By the end of December, he had surpassed his previous season's points total. Nicholls fractured his jaw during a game against the Calgary Flames at the end of January, but played two more games before getting his jaw wired shut. Despite this, he played the entirety of February with his jaw wired shut before cutting the wires in an airport before the Kings' March 11 game against the Chicago Black Hawks. He scored two goals that night to help the Kings end their franchise record losing streak. The following game, Nicholls became the fourth player in franchise history to score 40 goals in a single season. He became the first player besides Marcel Dionne to lead the team in scoring in over a decade.

Nicholls broke numerous league and franchise records throughout the 1984–85 season. Although he went pointless through the team's first three games, he finished the regular season with 100 points. On November 13, 1984, Nicholls became the first player in NHL history to score a goal in all four periods of a game (including overtime). It also marked his fifth NHL hat-trick and the second time in his career that he scored four goals. The following month, Nicholls set a new franchise record by maintaining a 25-game scoring streak. It was also the fourth-longest scoring streak in NHL history at the time.

Injuries that limited Nicholls to just 65 games in the 1987–88 season, and the rise of young centre Jimmy Carson, saw Nicholls slip to third in team scoring. On August 9, 1988, the Kings completed a blockbuster trade that brought Wayne Gretzky to Los Angeles. Slotting into the second-line centre job behind Gretzky set the stage for the most productive season for Nicholls, who noted his enjoyment at playing with Gretzky, stating, "It was the opportunity of a lifetime. I got to play with arguably the greatest player in the world for one year, and I took full advantage.” He scored a team-record 70 goals and added 80 assists for a total of 150 points, with the 70th goal coming on the heels of a hat trick in the penultimate game of the season that saw him score on an empty net. The 70th goal made him only the ninth player with a 70-goal season in NHL history. Nicholls played the line with Gretzky for the power play, which saw him record 49 of his 150 points on the powerplay, although he also recorded eight short-handed goals and six short-handed assists. Despite this, he did not receive any votes for the Hart Memorial Trophy (he finished 2nd in goals, 5th in assists, and 4th in points). It was the only time that Nicholls recorded a 50-goal season in his career.

The following season, Nicholls continued producing points for Los Angeles, highlighted by an eight-point effort on December 1, 1988, against the Toronto Maple Leafs, which put Nicholls into another small group, becoming one of only 13 players in NHL history to record an eight-point game. By the All-Star break, Nicholls had 75 points in 47 games and was selected, along with teammates Gretzky, Luc Robitaille and Steve Duchesne to play in the All-Star Game. The night before the All-Star Game, the Kings traded Nicholls to the New York Rangers in exchange for wingers Tomas Sandström and Tony Granato. Despite now playing for an Eastern Conference team, Nicholls played in the All-Star Game the next day representing the Western Conference (and playing against his new teammate Brian Leetch.) Despite his solid offensive production, the Kings were having a mediocre season with a 21-21-5 record at the time of the deal. Kings owner Bruce McNall felt "something was missing" and that the Kings were "soft" and needed some grit. Nicholls left the Kings as the franchise's fifth all-time leading scorer.

=== New York Rangers ===
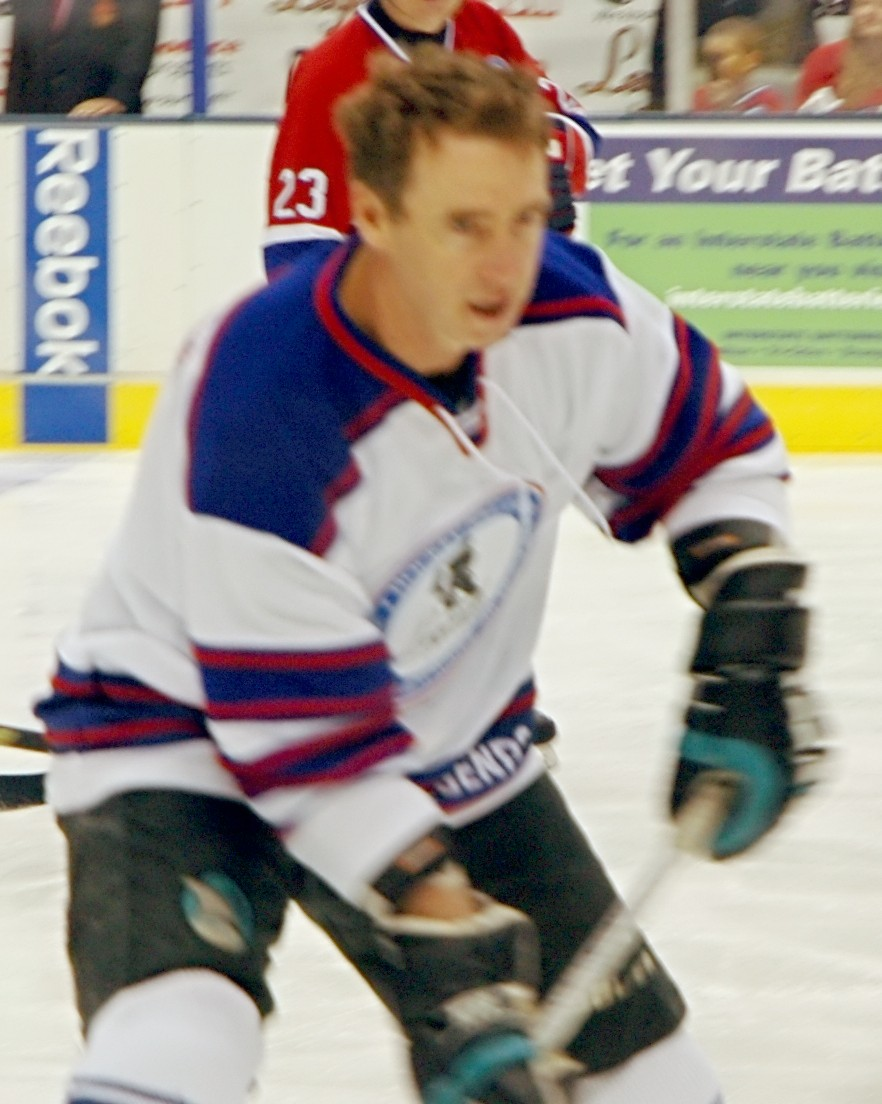
Nicholls at an Alumni Game in 2008.

Nicholls joined the New York Rangers following the All-Star Game and while he did not keep up his torrid scoring pace, he did produce at over a point-a-game pace for New York; in total, he had 39 goals and 73 assists for 112 total points for his last 100-point season as a player. The following season saw him contribute 25 goals and 48 assists for 73 points in 71 games, but playoff success eluded the Rangers in his tenure, with the team not reaching past the second round.

One game into the 1991–92 season, Nicholls was again involved in a blockbuster transaction when Rangers general manager Neil Smith packaged him up with prospects Steven Rice and Louie DeBrusk and shipped him to the Edmonton Oilers in exchange for Mark Messier. Nicholls, however, did not report to the Oilers for two full months because his wife was pregnant with twins and on bed rest. A week after the babies were born, he finally left New York to join the Oilers after surrendering over a quarter of a million dollars in salary for not reporting.

=== Edmonton Oilers ===
When Nicholls did finally join the Oilers, he posted 49 points in 49 games with the Oilers. He saved his best production for the postseason where he helped lead the Oilers to the Conference Finals. He was particularly effective in the first round where he posted five goals and 13 points in a six-game defeat of his former team, the Los Angeles Kings. Nicholls along with teammates including Joe Murphy, Vincent Damphousse, Dave Manson, Esa Tikkanen, and Bill Ranford took a 3-1 series lead against Division Champions Vancouver Canucks and took the second-round series victory home at Edmonton in Game 6 to advance to the 1992 Western Conference Finals. In the following season, his production slowed down and the Oilers finally accommodated his wish to move back East when they dealt him to the New Jersey Devils for young forwards Kevin Todd and Zdeno Ciger on January 13, 1993; he had recorded eight goals and 32 assists in 46 games prior to the trade.

=== Later career ===
Nicholls joined the Devils for their January 16 game against the New York Islanders, recording an assist. A week after joining the team, his son Jack fell into a coma that he never recovered from. Nicholls recorded 13 goals and 47 assists for the 1992–93 season that saw heightened criticism that he had lost a step in his game. Nicholls adapted his game to become more of a defensive forward in the tight-checking system of then-Devils coach Jacques Lemaire. He served as a key player for the team in the 1993–94 season that saw him score 19 goals with 27 assists in 61 games as the team finished with the second-best record in the league. In the February 13, 1994 game against the Tampa Bay Lightning, Nicholls scored a goal off Pat Jablonski to record his 1,000th career point as a player, doing so in his 858th career game. The Devils reached the Conference Finals but lost to the eventual Stanley Cup champion New York Rangers in seven games. When he became a free agent in July 1994, the Devils did not offer make him a qualifying offer. As such, on July 15, Nicholls signed a $2.1 million contract with the Chicago Blackhawks for one year with an option year.

In the strike-shortened 1994–95 season, Nicholls scored 22 goals while recording 29 assists for 51 points. Nicholls recorded one goal with eleven assists in 16 Stanley Cup playoff games as the Blackhawks lost in the Conference Finals. In his second and last season with Chicago, he played in just 59 games and recorded his last 50-point season with 19 goals and 41 assists for 60 total points as Chicago lost in the second round of the playoffs. In the 1996 offseason, Nicholls, now a free agent, wanted to play closer to his home in Brea, California. He received offers from the Dallas Stars and St. Louis Blues but did not receive an offer from the Mighty Ducks of Anaheim. However, he received attention from the San Jose Sharks and on July 30, 1996, Nicholls signed a two-year, $4.4 million contract (which included a third-year option) with the team. Nicholls scored 12 goals with 33 assists in his first season with San Jose. In his last full season with the Sharks, he reached the playoffs for the last time, recording five assists in six games.

Nicholls played just ten games of the 1998–99 season as a "fourth-line, checking center". He recorded no goals with two assists, with the final point coming on November 18 against the Los Angeles Kings in San Jose. He played what ended up as his final game in a 2-2 tie on November 21 versus the New York Rangers. In that same month, general manager Dean Lombardi suggested that Nicholls retire and join the Sharks' front office. On November 22, 1998, the team announced the retirement of Nicholls, although he expressed surprise that the team announced it the way they did. The team announced that they were planning to offer Nicholls an undetermined job within the organization. The way that his career ended still struck a nerve decades later in an interview that Nicholls had, as he noted that his time was withered down on the fourth line because head coach Darryl Sutter wanted to give time to Ron Sutter, his brother. While he harbored no ill will to Sutter, he felt that Lombardi failed to stand up for the team.

At the time of his retirement, he ranked 26th in NHL history in points and 32nd in goals. Nicholls averaged 1.07 points per game, making him one of 26 players at the time to play 1,000 games and average a point a game.

== Post-retirement ==
Following the Kings' firing of Terry Murray in December 2011, Nicholls asked their new head coach Darryl Sutter to join the team as a coaching consultant. He was unpaid for the first two months, with the Kings only covering his hotel room and meals, before being added to their payroll. As a consultant, he helped the Kings win the 2012 Stanley Cup Final. Nicholls spent his day with the Cup bringing it to West Guilford (bringing it to a local hockey rink) alongside a marina in nearby Haliburton before bringing it to his family camp and lake house. After retiring from hockey, he split his time between hunting, golf and hockey camps.

Nicholls' autobiography, Bernie Nicholls: From Flood Lights to Bright Lights, as written with Kevin Allen and Ross McKeon, was released in November 2022.

== International play ==
Medal record

Representing Canada

Men's ice hockey
Silver medal – second place	1985 Czechoslovakia	

Nicholls won a silver medal in the 1985 World Ice Hockey Championships while playing for Canada.

== Career statistics ==
=== Regular season and playoffs ===
			Regular season					Playoffs
Season	Team	League	GP	G	A	Pts	PIM	GP	G	A	Pts	PIM
1978–79	North York Rangers	OPJHL	50	40	62	102	60	—	—	—	—	—
1978–79	Kingston Canadians	OMJHL	2	0	1	1	0	—	—	—	—	—
1979–80	Kingston Canadians	OMJHL	68	36	43	79	85	3	1	0	1	10
1980–81	Kingston Canadians	OHL	65	63	89	152	109	14	8	10	18	17
1981–82	New Haven Nighthawks	AHL	55	41	30	71	31	—	—	—	—	—
1981–82	Los Angeles Kings	NHL	22	14	18	32	27	10	4	0	4	23
1982–83	Los Angeles Kings	NHL	71	28	22	50	124	—	—	—	—	—
1983–84	Los Angeles Kings	NHL	78	41	54	95	83	—	—	—	—	—
1984–85	Los Angeles Kings	NHL	80	46	54	100	76	3	1	1	2	9
1985–86	Los Angeles Kings	NHL	80	36	61	97	78	—	—	—	—	—
1986–87	Los Angeles Kings	NHL	80	33	48	81	101	5	2	5	7	6
1987–88	Los Angeles Kings	NHL	65	32	46	78	114	5	2	6	8	11
1988–89	Los Angeles Kings	NHL	79	70	80	150	96	11	7	9	16	12
1989–90	Los Angeles Kings	NHL	47	27	48	75	66	—	—	—	—	—
1989–90	New York Rangers	NHL	32	12	25	37	20	10	7	5	12	16
1990–91	New York Rangers	NHL	71	25	48	73	96	5	4	3	7	8
1991–92	New York Rangers	NHL	1	0	0	0	0	—	—	—	—	—
1991–92	Edmonton Oilers	NHL	49	20	29	49	60	16	8	11	19	25
1992–93	Edmonton Oilers	NHL	46	8	32	40	40	—	—	—	—	—
1992–93	New Jersey Devils	NHL	23	5	15	20	40	5	0	0	0	6
1993–94	New Jersey Devils	NHL	61	19	27	46	86	16	4	9	13	28
1994–95	Chicago Blackhawks	NHL	48	22	29	51	32	16	1	11	12	8
1995–96	Chicago Blackhawks	NHL	59	19	41	60	60	10	2	7	9	4
1996–97	San Jose Sharks	NHL	65	12	33	45	63	—	—	—	—	—
1997–98	San Jose Sharks	NHL	60	6	22	28	26	6	0	5	5	8
1998–99	San Jose Sharks	NHL	10	0	2	2	4	—	—	—	—	—
NHL totals			1,127	475	734	1,209	1,292	118	42	72	114	164

=== International ===
Year	Team	Event	GP	G	A	Pts	PIM
1985	Canada	WC	10	0	2	2	12

== See also ==
- List of NHL players with 1,000 games played
- List of NHL players with 1,000 points
