= Tomas Sandström =

Swedish ice hockey player

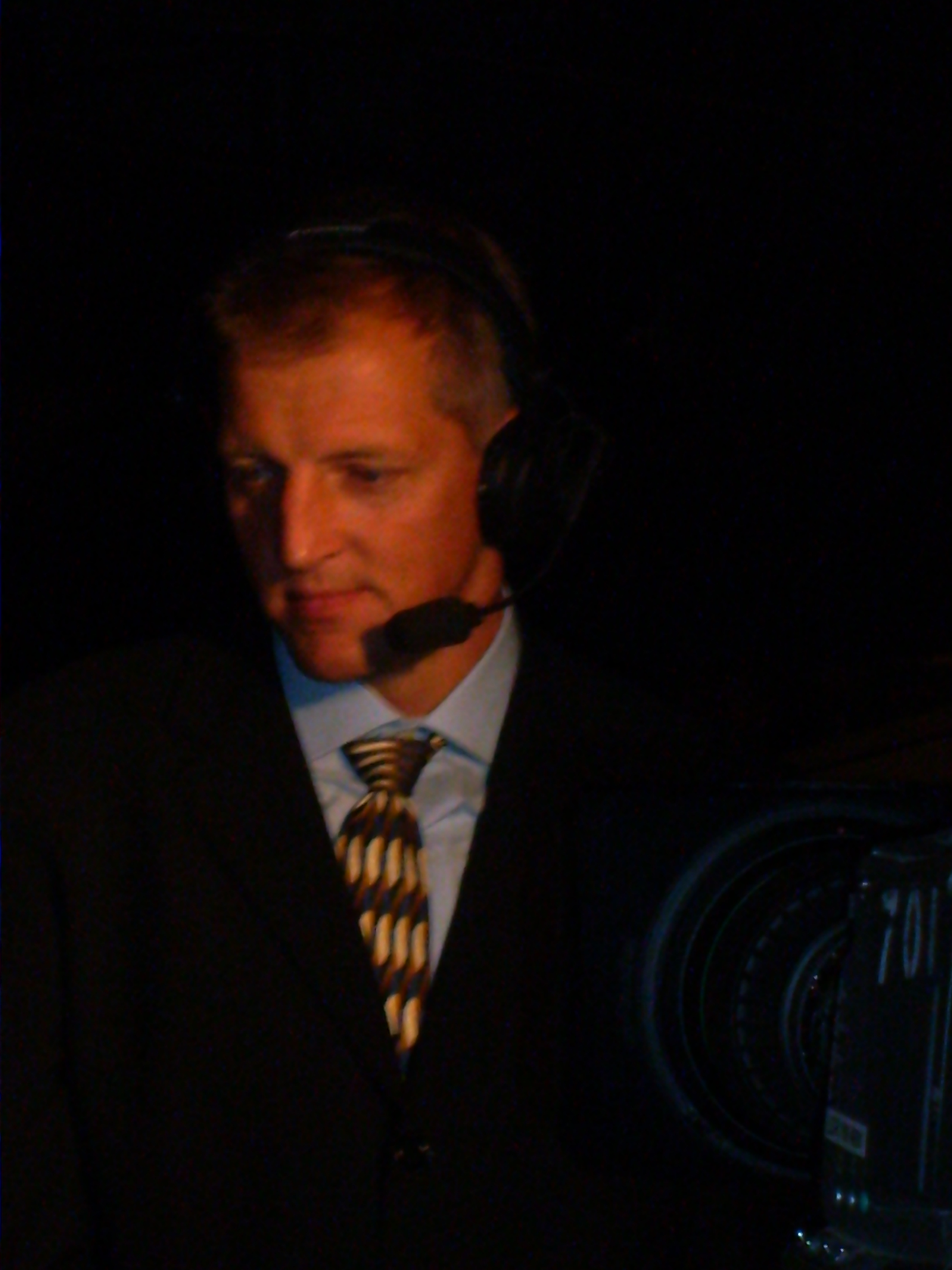
- Sandström in 2009
- Born: September 4, 1964 (age 62) Jakobstad, Finland
- Height: 6 ft 2 in (188 cm)
- Weight: 209 lb (95 kg; 14 st 13 lb)
- Position: Right wing
- Shot: Left
- Played for: New York Rangers; Los Angeles Kings; Pittsburgh Penguins; Detroit Red Wings; Mighty Ducks of Anaheim
- National team: Sweden
- NHL draft: 36th overall, 1982; New York Rangers
- Playing career: 1982–2002

Tomas Sandström (born September 4, 1964) is a Finnish-born Swedish former professional ice hockey right winger who played in the National Hockey League (NHL) from 1984 to 1999. Born in Finland, Sandström grew up in Fagersta, Sweden. A skilled power forward, he was effective when healthy but his career was marred by injuries due to his physical style of play.

He was a member of the 1997 Stanley Cup winning Detroit Red Wings team, and assisted on Darren McCarty's game-winning goal in the deciding game four.

Olympic medal record

Representing Sweden

Men's ice hockey
Bronze medal – third place	1984 Sarajevo	Ice hockey

== Playing career ==
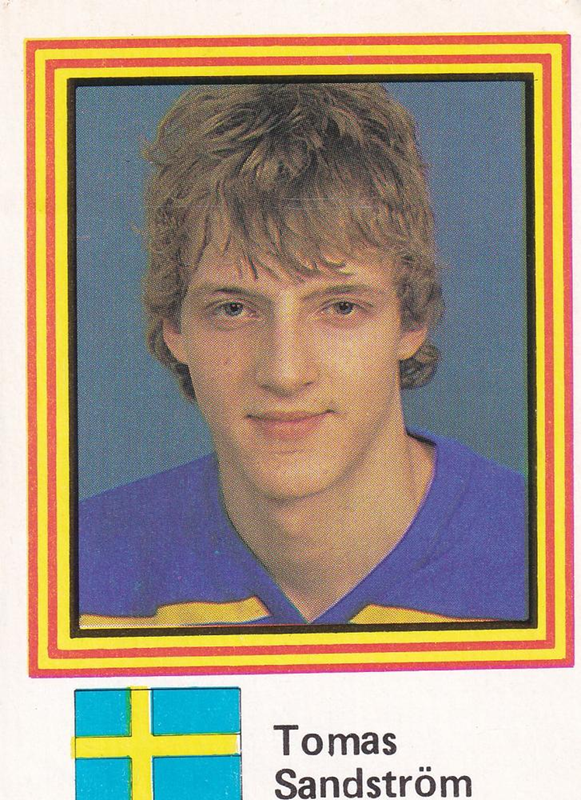
Sandström with Sweden in 1983

Sandström was selected 36th overall by the New York Rangers in the 1982 NHL entry draft. Sandström played 983 career NHL games, scoring 394 goals and 462 assists for 856 points, and also registered 1,193 career penalty minutes. Sandström won the Stanley Cup in 1997 with the Detroit Red Wings, assisting on Darren McCarty's game-winning goal in game four of the 1997 Stanley Cup Final against the Philadelphia Flyers.

After being acquired with Tony Granato by the Los Angeles Kings in January 1990 for former 70-goal scorer Bernie Nicholls, the two newest additions to Los Angeles combined with Wayne Gretzky to form a potent top line in Los Angeles. The line displayed its full dominance in the 1990 first round series against the defending Stanley Cup champion and the Western Conference regular season champion Calgary Flames, particularly in game four, with both Sandström and Granato along with Dave Taylor scoring hat tricks while Gretzky had a goal and five assists in a 12–4 rout.

Sandström suffered through several serious injuries during his tenure with Los Angeles. In a February 28, 1990 game that set the NHL record for most penalties in a game with 85, he was punched by the Edmonton Oilers' Glenn Anderson, leaving him with a broken cheekbone. A collision with Edmonton's Craig Muni caused a fractured leg in the 1991 Smythe Division Finals. Doug Gilmour of the Toronto Maple Leafs slashed and fractured Sandström's forearm in November 1992. Sandström was a key component of the Kings' run to the 1993 Stanley Cup Final, after missing most of the regular season with a broken jaw. Sandström finished third in playoff scoring behind Wayne Gretzky and Doug Gilmour.

On February 16, 1994, Sandström was traded to the Pittsburgh Penguins along with Shawn McEachern, in exchange for Marty McSorley and Jim Paek

On January 27, 1997, Sandström was traded by the Penguins to the Detroit Red Wings in exchange for Greg Johnson. He assisted on Darren McCarty's game-winning goal in game four of the Stanley Cup Final.

In August 1997, Sandström signed as a free agent with the Mighty Ducks of Anaheim, where he would spend the last two seasons of his NHL career. He finished with the worst plus-minus for a playoff career with -45.

Today, Sandström works as a firefighter in Skanör, Sweden.

== Achievements ==
- All-Star Selection, Forward, 1983 IIHF world junior hockey championships
- Named to the 1985 NHL All-Rookie Team.
- Selected to two NHL All-Star Games: 1988 and 1991
- In the 2009 book 100 Ranger Greats, was ranked No. 70 all-time of the 901 New York Rangers who had played during the team's first 82 seasons
- Won the Stanley Cup in 1997 with the Detroit Red Wings.

== Career statistics ==
=== Regular season and playoffs ===
			Regular season					Playoffs
Season	Team	League	GP	G	A	Pts	PIM	GP	G	A	Pts	PIM
1979–80	Fagersta HK	SWE.2	6	1	1	2	0	—	—	—	—	—
1980–81	Fagersta HK	SWE.3	20	23	5	28	—	—	—	—	—	—
1981–82	Fagersta HK	SWE.2	32	28	11	39	74	—	—	—	—	—
1982–83	Brynäs IF	SEL	36	23	14	37	50	—	—	—	—	—
1983–84	Brynäs IF	SEL	34	19	10	29	81	—	—	—	—	—
1984–85	New York Rangers	NHL	74	29	30	59	51	3	0	2	2	0
1985–86	New York Rangers	NHL	73	25	29	54	109	16	4	6	10	20
1986–87	New York Rangers	NHL	64	40	34	74	60	6	1	2	3	20
1987–88	New York Rangers	NHL	69	28	40	68	95	—	—	—	—	—
1988–89	New York Rangers	NHL	79	32	56	88	148	4	3	2	5	12
1989–90	New York Rangers	NHL	48	19	19	38	100	—	—	—	—	—
1989–90	Los Angeles Kings	NHL	28	13	20	33	28	10	5	4	9	19
1990–91	Los Angeles Kings	NHL	68	45	44	89	106	10	4	4	8	14
1991–92	Los Angeles Kings	NHL	49	17	22	39	70	6	0	3	3	8
1992–93	Los Angeles Kings	NHL	39	25	27	52	57	24	8	17	25	12
1993–94	Los Angeles Kings	NHL	51	17	24	41	59	—	—	—	—	—
1993–94	Pittsburgh Penguins	NHL	27	6	11	17	24	6	0	0	0	4
1994–95	Malmö IF	SEL	12	10	5	15	14	—	—	—	—	—
1994–95	Pittsburgh Penguins	NHL	47	21	23	44	42	12	3	3	6	16
1995–96	Pittsburgh Penguins	NHL	58	35	35	70	69	18	4	2	6	30
1996–97	Pittsburgh Penguins	NHL	40	9	15	24	33	—	—	—	—	—
1996–97	Detroit Red Wings	NHL	34	9	9	18	36	20	0	4	4	24
1997–98	Mighty Ducks of Anaheim	NHL	77	9	8	17	64	—	—	—	—	—
1998–99	Mighty Ducks of Anaheim	NHL	58	15	17	32	42	4	0	0	0	4
1999–2000	Malmö IF	SEL	42	16	13	29	28	6	3	2	5	10
2000–01	Malmö IF	SEL	50	17	9	26	90	8	3	3	6	60
2001–02	Malmö IF	SEL	37	8	7	15	40	5	0	1	1	6
SEL totals			211	93	58	151	303	19	6	6	12	76
NHL totals			983	394	463	857	1,193	139	32	49	81	183

=== International ===
Year	Team	Event	GP	G	A	Pts	PIM
1982	Sweden	EJC	5	5	2	7	16
1983	Sweden	WJC	7	9	3	12	—
1984	Sweden	WJC	7	4	3	7	12
1984	Sweden	OLY	7	2	1	3	6
1984	Sweden	CC	8	1	1	2	2
1985	Sweden	WC	10	3	6	9	18
1987	Sweden	WC	8	4	6	10	6
1989	Sweden	WC	10	4	3	7	14
1991	Sweden	CC	6	1	2	3	8
1998	Sweden	OLY	4	0	1	1	0
Junior totals			19	18	8	26	—
Senior totals			53	15	20	35	54
