= 1985 Stanley Cup playoffs =

NHL hockey playoffs

Tournament details
- Dates: April 10–May 30, 1985
- Teams: 16
- Defending champions: Edmonton Oilers

Final positions
- Champions: Edmonton Oilers
- Runners-up: Philadelphia Flyers

Tournament statistics
- Scoring leader(s): Wayne Gretzky (Oilers) (47 points)

Awards
- MVP: Wayne Gretzky (Oilers)

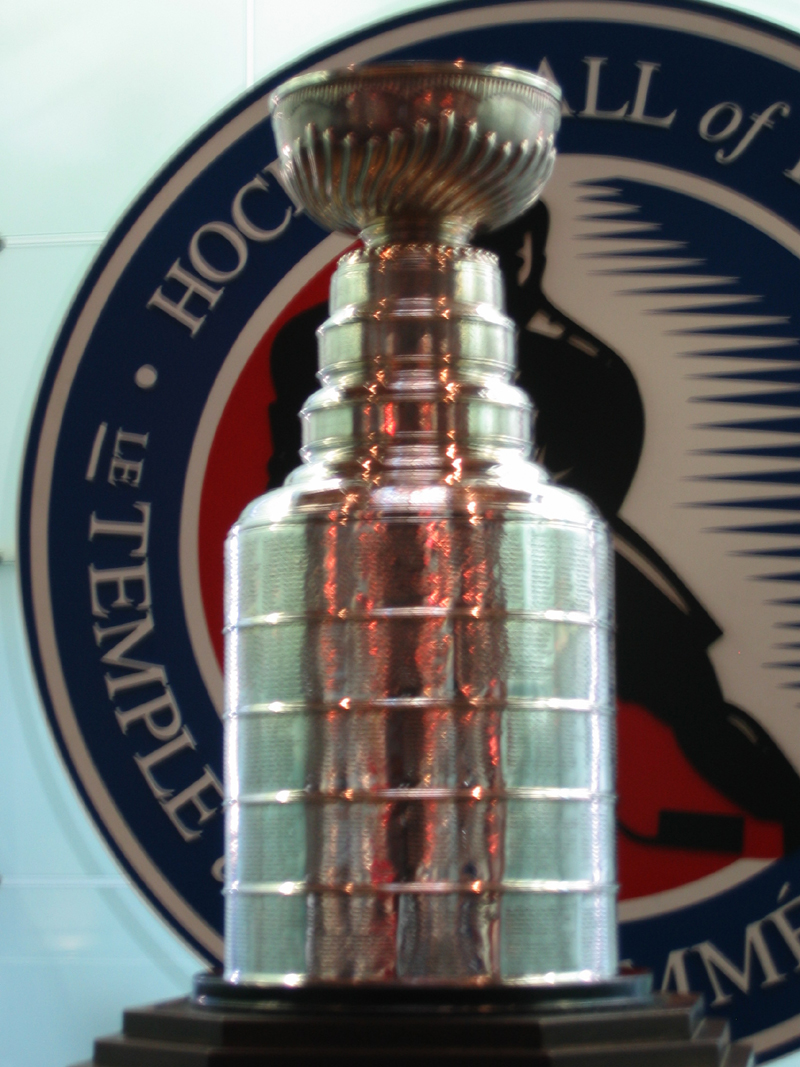
The Stanley Cup

The 1985 Stanley Cup playoffs, the playoff tournament of the National Hockey League (NHL) began on April 10, after the conclusion of the 1984–85 NHL season. The playoffs concluded on May 30 with the champion Edmonton Oilers defeating the Philadelphia Flyers 8–3 to win the final series four games to one and win the Stanley Cup.

== Playoff seeds ==
The top four teams in each division qualified for the playoffs, as follows:

=== Prince of Wales Conference ===
==== Adams Division ====
1. Montreal Canadiens, Adams Division champions – 94 points
2. Quebec Nordiques – 91 points
3. Buffalo Sabres – 90 points
4. Boston Bruins – 82 points

==== Patrick Division ====
1. Philadelphia Flyers, Patrick Division champions, Prince of Wales Conference regular season champions – 113 points
2. Washington Capitals – 101 points
3. New York Islanders – 86 points
4. New York Rangers – 62 points

=== Clarence Campbell Conference ===
==== Norris Division ====
1. St. Louis Blues, Norris Division champions – 86 points
2. Chicago Black Hawks – 83 points
3. Detroit Red Wings – 66 points
4. Minnesota North Stars – 62 points

==== Smythe Division ====
1. Edmonton Oilers, Smythe Division champions, Clarence Campbell Conference regular season champions – 109 points
2. Winnipeg Jets – 96 points
3. Calgary Flames – 94 points
4. Los Angeles Kings – 82 points

== Playoff bracket ==
In the division semifinals, the fourth seeded team in each division played against the division winner from their division. The other series matched the second and third place teams from the divisions. The two winning teams from each division's semifinals then met in the division finals. The two division winners of each conference then played in the conference finals. The two conference winners then advanced to the Stanley Cup Final. In each series, home ice advantage was awarded to the team that had the better regular season record.

Each division semifinals series was competed in a best-of-five playoff following a 2–2–1 format (scores in the bracket indicate the number of games won in each series), with the team with home ice advantage playing at home for games one and two (and game five, if necessary), and the other team playing at home for game three (and game four, if necessary). In the next two rounds, each series was competed in a best-of-seven playoff following a 2–2–1–1–1 format, with the team with home ice advantage playing at home for games one and two (and games five and seven, if necessary), and the other team playing at home for games three and four (and game six, if necessary). For the second and final season, a 2-3-2 format was used in the Stanley Cup Final, with the sites for games five and six switched.

Division semifinals	Division finals
A1	Montreal	3
A4	Boston	2
A1	Montreal	3
A2	Quebec	4
A2	Quebec	3
A3	Buffalo	2
Prince of Wales Conference
P1	Philadelphia	3
P4	NY Rangers	0
P1	Philadelphia	4
P3	NY Islanders	1
P2	Washington	2
P3	NY Islanders	3
N1	St. Louis	0
N4	Minnesota	3
N4	Minnesota	2
N2	Chicago	4
N2	Chicago	3
N3	Detroit	0
Clarence Campbell Conference
S1	Edmonton	3
S4	Los Angeles	0
S1	Edmonton	4
S2	Winnipeg	0
S2	Winnipeg	3
S3	Calgary	1

Conference finals
A2	Quebec	2
P1	Philadelphia	4
N2	Chicago	2
S1	Edmonton	4

Stanley Cup Final
P1	Philadelphia	1
S1	Edmonton	4

== Division semifinals ==
=== Prince of Wales Conference ===
==== (A1) Montreal Canadiens vs. (A4) Boston Bruins ====
This was the 20th playoff series between these two teams. Montreal lead 17–2 in previous playoff series meetings. This was a rematch of last year's Adams Division Semifinals, in which Montreal won in a three-game sweep.

In the series finale, the Canadiens got the only goal when Mats Naslund scored with just 51 seconds remaining in regulation. Steve Penney stopped all 20 shots to register the shutout.

April 10	Boston Bruins	5–3	Montreal Canadiens	Montreal Forum	Recap
Charlie Simmer (1) – 05:18; Mike O'Connell (1) – pp – 18:15		First period	No Scoring
Ken Linseman (1) – 06:26		Second period	08:52 – Petr Svoboda (1)
Keith Crowder (1) – 09:21; Rick Middleton (1) – 14:05		Third period	07:08 – Mario Tremblay (1); 07:50 – Bobby Smith (1)
Doug Keans 19 saves / 22 shots		Goalie stats	Steve Penney 12 saves / 17 shots

April 11	Boston Bruins	3–5	Montreal Canadiens	Montreal Forum	Recap
No scoring		First period	No scoring
Keith Crowder (2) – 01:40; Steve Kasper (1) – 11:08; Rick Middleton (2) – 18:57		Second period	01:00 – Larry Robinson (1); 10:52 – Serge Boisvert
No scoring		Third period	00:20 – pp – Chris Chelios (1); 15:40 – Chris Nilan (1); 18:21 – Guy Carbonneau (1)
Doug Keans 25 saves / 30 shots		Goalie stats	Steve Penney 25 saves / 28 shots

April 13	Montreal Canadiens	4–2	Boston Bruins	Boston Garden	Recap
Steve Rooney (1) – 01:07; Mats Naslund (1) – pp – 08:34; Bobby Smith (2) – pp – 11:02		First period	19:02 – Charlie Simmer (2)
No scoring		Second period	18:32 – Dave Reid (1)
Ryan Walter (1) – 05:08		Third period	No scoring
Steve Penney 21 saves / 23 shots		Goalie stats	Pete Peeters 22 saves / 26 shots

April 14	Montreal Canadiens	6–7	Boston Bruins	Boston Garden	Recap
Ryan Walter (2) – 04:53; Mats Naslund (2) – pp – 15:02; Serge Boisvert (2) – 15:30; Bobby Smith (3) – pp – 19:57		First period	09:21 – Rick Middleton (3)
Steve Rooney (2) – 09:52; Larry Robinson (2) – 18:20		Second period	08:55 – Keith Crowder (3); 09:21 – Butch Goring (1); 13:15 – Terry O'Reilly (1); 13:36 – Ken Linseman (2); 19:36 – Ken Linseman (3)
No Scoring		Third period	13:12 – Ken Linseman (4)
Steve Penney 19 saves / 26 shots		Goalie stats	Doug Keans 27 saves / 33 shots

April 16	Boston Bruins	0–1	Montreal Canadiens	Montreal Forum	Recap
No Scoring		First period	No Scoring
No Scoring		Second period	No Scoring
No Scoring		Third period	19:09 – Mats Naslund (3)
Doug Keans 24 saves / 25 shots		Goalie stats	Steve Penney 20 saves / 20 shots

Montreal won series 3–2

==== (A2) Quebec Nordiques vs. (A3) Buffalo Sabres ====
This was the second playoff series meeting between these two teams. This was a rematch of last year's Adams Division Semifinals, in which Quebec won in a three-game sweep.

In the final game, Buffalo led 5–3 with just nine minutes remaining but allowed the Nordiques to score two goals in a span of 64 seconds to tie it at 12:06. The Nordiques' Brent Ashton then got the winner with only 69 seconds left.

April 10	Buffalo Sabres	2–5	Quebec Nordiques	Quebec Coliseum	Recap
Paul Cyr (1) – 12:19		First period	04:28 – pp – Alain Lemieux (1)
Ric Seiling (1) – 19:02		Second period	11:55 – Michel Goulet (1); 13:39 – Anton Stastny (1)
No scoring		Third period	04:02 – Wilf Paiement (1); 08:38 – Wilf Paiement (2)
Tom Barrasso 34 saves / 39 shots		Goalie stats	Mario Gosselin 28 saves / 30 shots

April 11	Buffalo Sabres	2–3	Quebec Nordiques	Quebec Coliseum	Recap
Mike Foligno (1) – 06:37		First period	05:46 – pp – Michel Goulet (2)
No scoring		Second period	16:08 – Brent Ashton (1)
Phil Housley (1) – 14:28		Third period	15:09 – Normand Rochefort (1)
Tom Barrasso 20 saves / 23 shots		Goalie stats	Mario Gosselin 19 saves / 21 shots

April 13	Quebec Nordiques	4–6	Buffalo Sabres	Buffalo Memorial Auditorium	Recap
Michel Goulet (3) – pp – 07:54		First period	No scoring
Anton Stastny (2) – 09:02		Second period	07:57 – Lindy Ruff (1)
Jean-Francois Sauve (1) – 05:48; Alain Cote (1) – 12:27		Third period	03:00 – Bill Hajt (1); 05:17 – Paul Cyr (2); 16:55 – John Tucker (1); 17:35 – Dave Andreychuk (1); 19:57 – en – Ric Seiling (2)
Mario Gosselin 25 saves / 30 shots		Goalie stats	Tom Barrasso 25 saves / 29 shots

April 14	Quebec Nordiques	4–7	Buffalo Sabres	Buffalo Memorial Auditorium	Recap
Michel Goulet (4) – pp – 19:07		First period	No scoring
Michel Goulet (5) – 15:02; Paul Gillis (1) – 17:47		Second period	05:53 – Craig Ramsay (1); 17:36 – Phil Housley (2)
Brent Ashton (2) – pp – 15:20		Third period	00:37 – Gilbert Perreault (1); 03:46 – Dave Andreychuk (2); 07:55 – Dave Andreychuk (3); 16:23 – Dave Andreychuk (4); 19:58 – Ric Seiling (3)
Dan Bouchard 17 saves / 24 shots		Goalie stats	Tom Barrasso 22 saves / 26 shots

April 16	Buffalo Sabres	5–6	Quebec Nordiques	Quebec Coliseum	Recap
Lindy Ruff (2) – pp – 06:12; Gilbert Perreault (2) – pp – 11:23; Gilbert Perreault (3) – 14:36		First period	02:17 – pp – Michel Goulet (6); 17:08 – Blake Wesley (1); 19:18 – Jean-Francois Sauve (2)
Ric Seiling (4) – 05:06		Second period	No scoring
Phil Housley (3) – 01:27		Third period	11:02 – Alain Cote (2); 12:06 – Randy Moller (1); 18:51 – Brent Ashton (3)
Tom Barrasso 28 saves / 34 shots		Goalie stats	Mario Gosselin 18 saves / 23 shots

Quebec won series 3–2

==== (P1) Philadelphia Flyers vs. (P4) New York Rangers ====
This was the sixth playoff series between these two teams. New York won three of the previous five meetings. Their last meeting was won by New York in a three-game sweep in the 1983 Patrick Division Semifinals.

April 10	New York Rangers	4–5	OT	Philadelphia Flyers	Spectrum	Recap
No scoring		First period		04:04 – Ron Sutter (1); 06:47 – Todd Bergen (1); 11:45 – Brad McCrimmon (1)
Reijo Ruotsalainen (1) – pp – 03:30; Don Maloney (1) – 16:34		Second period		No scoring
Don Maloney (2) – 01:17; Anders Hedberg (1) – 19:34		Third period		06:04 – Tim Kerr (1)
No scoring		First overtime period		08:01 – Mark Howe (1)
Glen Hanlon 33 saves / 38 shots		Goalie stats		Pelle Lindbergh 27 saves / 31 shots

April 11	New York Rangers	1–3	Philadelphia Flyers	Spectrum	Recap
No scoring		First period	No scoring
George McPhee (1) – 01:01		Second period	11:05 – pp – Todd Bergen (2)
No scoring		Third period	05:23 – Todd Bergen (3); 17:40 – Ilkka Sinisalo (1)
Glen Hanlon 33 saves / 36 shots		Goalie stats	Pelle Lindbergh 38 saves / 39 shots

April 13	Philadelphia Flyers	6–5	New York Rangers	Madison Square Garden	Recap
Peter Zezel (1) – pp – 17:26		First period	12:36 – Reijo Ruotsalainen (2); 16:41 – pp – Don Maloney (3)
Doug Crossman (1) – 06:25; Tim Kerr (2) – pp – 10:06; Tim Kerr (3) – 14:58; Tim Kerr (4) – pp – 16:42; Tim Kerr (5) – pp – 18:22		Second period	09:08 – pp – Willie Huber (1)
No scoring		Third period	00:55 – pp – Don Maloney (4); 03:49 – Anders Hedberg (2)
Pelle Lindbergh 27 saves / 32 shots		Goalie stats	Glen Hanlon 18 saves / 24 shots John Vanbiesbrouck 12 saves / 12 shots

Philadelphia won series 3–0

==== (P2) Washington Capitals vs. (P3) New York Islanders ====
This was the third playoff series meeting between these two teams. New York won both previous series over the past two seasons, including last year's Patrick Division Finals in five games.

The series comeback by the Islanders is the only instance in NHL history where a team has overcome a 2–0 series deficit to win a best-of-five series.

April 10	New York Islanders	3–4	OT	Washington Capitals	Capital Centre	Recap
No scoring		First period		No scoring
Mike Bossy (1) – pp – 04:00; Denis Potvin (1) – 09:07; Mike Bossy (2) – 18:37		Second period		11:15 – pp – Larry Murphy (1); 11:31 – pp – Larry Murphy (2); 13:24 – Mike Gartner (1)
No scoring		Third period		No scoring
No scoring		First overtime period		02:28 – Alan Haworth (1)
Billy Smith 38 saves / 42 shots		Goalie stats		Pat Riggin 14 saves / 17 shots

April 11	New York Islanders	1–2	2OT	Washington Capitals	Capital Centre	Recap
No scoring		First period		05:44 – Lou Franceschetti (1)
No scoring		Second period		No scoring
Bryan Trottier (1) – 07:41		Third period		No scoring
No scoring		Second overtime period		01:23 – Mike Gartner (2)
Kelly Hrudey 39 saves / 41 shots		Goalie stats		Al Jensen 36 saves / 37 shots

April 13	Washington Capitals	1–2	New York Islanders	Nassau Coliseum	Recap
No scoring		First period	No scoring
No scoring		Second period	No scoring
Mike Gartner (3) – 19:19		Third period	05:11 – Bryan Trottier (2); 13:44 – Brent Sutter (1)
Al Jensen 13 saves / 15 shots		Goalie stats	Billy Smith 15 saves / 16 shots

April 14	Washington Capitals	4–6	New York Islanders	Nassau Coliseum	Recap
Mike Gartner (4) – pp – 09:28; Dave Christian (1) – 13:00		First period	01:51 – pp – Denis Potvin (2); 13:15 – Bobby Nystrom (1)
Doug Jarvis (1) – 05:10; Bengt-Ake Gustafsson (1) – pp – 13:54		Second period	No scoring
No scoring		Third period	03:26 – Patrick Flatley (1); 07:55 – pp – Mike Bossy (3); 18:52 – Bryan Trottier (3); 19:44 – en – Mike Bossy (4)
Al Jensen 29 saves / 34 shots		Goalie stats	Billy Smith 29 saves / 33 shots

April 16	New York Islanders	2–1	Washington Capitals	Capital Centre	Recap
No scoring		First period	No scoring
Anders Kallur (1) – 10:08; Brent Sutter (2) – 16:56		Second period	19:31 – Bobby Carpenter (1)
No scoring		Third period	No scoring
Billy Smith 39 saves / 40 shots		Goalie stats	Pat Riggin 20 saves / 22 shots

New York won series 3–2

=== Clarence Campbell Conference ===
==== (N1) St. Louis Blues vs. (N4) Minnesota North Stars ====
This was the sixth playoff series meeting between these two teams. St. Louis won three of the previous five series. This was a rematch of last year's Norris Division Finals in which Minnesota won in seven games.

April 10	Minnesota North Stars	3–2	St. Louis Blues	St. Louis Arena	Recap
Neal Broten (1) – 10:58		First period	12:01 – sh – Rob Ramage (1)
Craig Hartsburg (1) – pp – 15:01		Second period	No scoring
Keith Acton (1) – 10:45		Third period	11:25 – Jorgen Pettersson (1)
Gilles Meloche 39 saves / 41 shots		Goalie stats	Rick Wamsley 21 saves / 24 shots

April 11	Minnesota North Stars	4–3	St. Louis Blues	St. Louis Arena	Recap
No scoring		First period	05:17 – pp – Brian Sutter (1)
Keith Acton (2) – 11:06; Willi Plett (1) – pp – 17:07		Second period	01:37 – pp – Brian Sutter (2)
Willi Plett (2) – 07:17; Keith Acton (3) – 15:50		Third period	17:43 – Doug Gilmour (1)
Gilles Meloche 40 saves / 43 shots		Goalie stats	Rick Wamsley 28 saves / 32 shots

April 13	St. Louis Blues	0–2	Minnesota North Stars	Met Center	Recap
No scoring		First period	00:46 – Tony McKegney (1); 05:53 – Craig Hartsburg (2)
No scoring		Second period	No scoring
No scoring		Third period	No scoring
Greg Millen 33 saves / 35 shots		Goalie stats	Gilles Meloche 27 saves / 27 shots

Minnesota won series 3–0

==== (N2) Chicago Black Hawks vs. (N3) Detroit Red Wings ====
This was the tenth playoff series meeting between these two teams. Chicago had won five of the previous nine series. Their most recent meeting was in the 1970 Stanley Cup Quarterfinals, which the Black Hawks won in a four-game sweep.

April 10	Detroit Red Wings	5–9	Chicago Black Hawks	Chicago Stadium	Recap
Bob Manno (1) – 19:31		First period	04:26 – pp – Doug Wilson (1); 04:47 – Curt Fraser (1); 08:36 – pp – Denis Savard (1); 17:30 – Ken Yaremchuk (1)
Reed Larson (1) – 03:18; John Ogrodnick (1) – 19:03		Second period	00:17 – Jack O'Callahan (1); 08:16 – Behn Wilson (1); 12:20 – Eddie Olczyk (1); 17:52 – Steve Larmer (1)
Randy Ladouceur (1) – 07:55; Steve Yzerman (1) – 09:34		Third period	04:07 – Eddie Olcyzk (2)
Greg Stefan 11 saves / 17 shots Corrado Micalef 10 saves / 13 shots		Goalie stats	Murray Bannerman 34 saves / 37 shots Warren Skorodenski 12 saves / 14 shots

April 11	Detroit Red Wings	1–6	Chicago Black Hawks	Chicago Stadium	Recap
No scoring		First period	05:49 – Darryl Sutter (1); 16:33 – Ken Yaremchuk (2); 17:06 – Al Secord (1)
No scoring		Second period	No scoring
Joey Kocur (1) – 07:20		Third period	05:20 – Curt Fraser (2); 09:53 – pp – Keith Brown (1); 15:05 – pp – Doug Wilson (2)
Greg Stefan 19 saves / 25 shots		Goalie stats	Murray Bannerman 30 saves / 31 shots

April 13	Chicago Black Hawks	8–2	Detroit Red Wings	Joe Louis Arena	Recap
Steve Ludzik (1) – 16:38		First period	No Scoring
Steve Larmer (2) – pp – 07:17; Darryl Sutter (2) – 08:39; Denis Savard (2) – 10:13		Second period	13:14 – pp – Ron Duguay (1)
Eddie Olczyk (3) – 06:58; Denis Savard (3) – pp – 10:43; Behn Wilson (2) – pp – 12:05; Rick Paterson (1) – 19:00		Third period	16:14 – pp – Steve Yzerman (2)
Murray Bannerman 21 saves / 23 shots		Goalie stats	Greg Stefan 22 saves / 27 shots Corrado Micalef 2 saves / 5 shots

Chicago won series 3-0

==== (S1) Edmonton Oilers vs. (S4) Los Angeles Kings ====
This was the second playoff series between these two teams. Los Angeles won their only previous meeting in a stunning upset 3–2 in the 1982 Smythe Division Semifinals.

April 10	Los Angeles Kings	2–3	OT	Edmonton Oilers	Northlands Coliseum	Recap
Craig Redmond (1) – 16:08		First period		14:19 – Jari Kurri (1)
No scoring		Second period		13:19 – Paul Coffey (1)
Bernie Nicholls (1) – 15:23		Third period		No scoring
No scoring		First overtime period		03:01 – Lee Fogolin Jr.
Bob Janecyk 31 saves / 34 shots		Goalie stats		Grant Fuhr 31 saves / 33 shots

April 11	Los Angeles Kings	2–4	Edmonton Oilers	Northlands Coliseum	Recap
No scoring		First period	01:10 – Paul Coffey (2)
Dave Taylor (1) – 03:53		Second period	No scoring
Doug Smith (1) – 10:09		Third period	06:17 – Mark Napier (1); 06:59 – Mike Krushelnyski (1); 19:16 – en – Jari Kurri (2)
Bob Janecyk 28 saves / 31 shots		Goalie stats	Grant Fuhr 33 saves / 35 shots

April 13	Edmonton Oilers	4–3	OT	Los Angeles Kings	The Forum	Recap
Mark Messier (1) – 10:00; Mark Messier (2) – sh – 17:49		First period		02:06 – pp – Marcel Dionne (1)
Mark Napier (2) – 14:48		Second period		No scoring
No scoring		Third period		07:02 – Garry Galley (1); 11:32 – Dave Taylor (2)
Glenn Anderson (1) – 00:46		First overtime period		No scoring
Grant Fuhr 35 saves / 38 shots		Goalie stats		Bob Janecyk 30 saves / 34 shots

Edmonton won series 3–0

==== (S2) Winnipeg Jets vs. (S3) Calgary Flames ====
This was the first playoff series between these two teams.

April 10	Calgary Flames	4–5	OT	Winnipeg Jets	Winnipeg Arena	Recap
No scoring		First period		05:27 – pp – Dave Babych (1)
Eddy Beers (1) – pp – 02:53; Hakan Loob (1) – 05:44; Paul Reinhart (1) – 11:32; Steve Konroyd (1) – sh – 14:38		Second period		16:08 – pp – Paul MacLean (1)
No scoring		Third period		00:20 – Dale Hawerchuk (1); 04:33 – pp – Dave Ellett (1)
No scoring		First overtime period		07:56 – Brian Mullen (1)
Rejean Lemelin 26 saves / 31 shots		Goalie stats		Brian Hayward 27 saves / 31 shots

April 11	Calgary Flames	2–5	Winnipeg Jets	Winnipeg Arena	Recap
Al MacInnis (1) – pp – 03:36		First period	No scoring
Steve Bozek (1) – pp – 07:55		Second period	00:47 – pp – Dale Hawerchuk (2); 01:03 – Doug Smail (1)
No scoring		Third period	08:58 – Scott Arniel (1); 18:38 – Laurie Boschman (1); 19:13 – en – Ron Wilson (1)
Rejean Lemelin 22 saves / 26 shots		Goalie stats	Brian Hayward 20 saves / 22 shots

April 13	Winnipeg Jets	0–4	Calgary Flames	Olympic Saddledome	Recap
No scoring		First period	No scoring
No scoring		Second period	05:56 – pp – Joel Otto (1); 10:21 – Hakan Loob (2); 19:09 – Jamie Macoun (1)
No scoring		Third period	11:32 – sh – Hakan Loob (3)
Brian Hayward 31 saves / 34 shots Marc Behrend 9 saves / 10 shots		Goalie stats	Rejean Lemelin 33 saves / 33 shots

April 14	Winnipeg Jets	5–3	Calgary Flames	Olympic Saddledome	Recap
Thomas Steen (1) – pp – 02:51		First period	10:31 – pp – Perry Berezan (1)
Doug Smail (2) – sh – 02:58; Andrew McBain (1) – 04:06; Ron Wilson (2) – 08:09; Laurie Boschman (2) – sh – 13:44		Second period	16:12 – Joel Otto (2)
No scoring		Third period	05:10 – Jim Peplinski (1)
Marc Behrend 35 saves / 38 shots		Goalie stats	Rejean Lemelin 32 saves / 37 shots

Winnipeg won series 3–1

== Division finals ==
=== Prince of Wales Conference ===
==== (A1) Montreal Canadiens vs. (A2) Quebec Nordiques ====
This was the third playoff series meeting between these two teams. The teams had split their prior two meetings. This was a rematch of last year's Adams Division Finals in which Montreal won in six games.

The Quebec Nordiques and Montreal Canadiens battled in a seven-game series. Bitter rivals from the province of Quebec, the Nords shocked the Habs in 1982, only to see a fourth-place Montreal club upset Quebec two years later. In the deciding seventh game at the Montreal Forum, Peter Stastny scored the game and series winning goal, giving Quebec an improbable 3–2 overtime win and berth in the Wales Conference Finals. The franchise did not get to the conference finals again until 1996, their first year as the Colorado Avalanche, in which they won the Stanley Cup.

April 18	Quebec Nordiques	2–1	OT	Montreal Canadiens	Montreal Forum	Recap
Brent Ashton (4) – 09:38		First period		11:50 – Lucien DeBlois (1)
No scoring		Second period		No scoring
No scoring		Third period		No scoring
Mark Kumpel (1) – 12:23		First overtime period		No scoring
Mario Gosselin 18 saves / 19 shots		Goalie stats		Steve Penney 26 saves / 28 shots

April 21	Quebec Nordiques	4–6	Montreal Canadiens	Montreal Forum	Recap
Peter Stastny (1) – pp – 02:19; Michel Goulet (7) – pp – 04:29		First period	09:52 – pp – Serge Boisvert (3); 15:29 – pp – Chris Chelios (2)
No scoring		Second period	03:21 – Mike McPhee (1); 05:35 – Mats Naslund (4)
Michel Goulet (8) – pp – 02:09; Peter Stastny (2) – 02:54		Third period	15:08 – Mats Naslund (5); 19:02 – en – Bob Gainey (1)
Mario Gosselin 21 saves / 26 shots		Goalie stats	Steve Penney 24 saves / 28 shots

April 23	Montreal Canadiens	6–7	OT	Quebec Nordiques	Quebec Coliseum	Recap
Mats Naslund (6) – pp – 04:19; Bobby Smith (4) – pp – 08:51		First period		03:23 – pp – Anton Stastny (3); 14:44 – Michel Goulet (9)
Guy Carbonneau (2) – 02:50; Bobby Smith (5) – 11:57		Second period		06:39 – Michel Goulet (10)
Mike McPhee (2) – 06:31; Mike McPhee (3) – 08:32		Third period		00:52 – pp – Michel Goulet (11); 05:11 – pp – Bruce Bell (1); 15:00 – Wilf Paiement (3)
No scoring		First overtime period		18:36 – Dale Hunter (1)
Steve Penney 37 saves / 44 shots		Goalie stats		Mario Gosselin 30 saves / 36 shots

April 25	Montreal Canadiens	3–1	Quebec Nordiques	Quebec Coliseum	Recap
Lucien DeBlois (2) – 06:48		First period	17:06 – Randy Moller (2)
Guy Carbonneau (3) – sh – 13:26		Second period	No scoring
Mario Tremblay (2) – pp – 04:40		Third period	No scoring
Steve Penney 20 saves / 21 shots		Goalie stats	Mario Gosselin 27 saves / 30 shots

April 27	Quebec Nordiques	5–1	Montreal Canadiens	Montreal Forum	Recap
Brad Maxwell (1) – 11:14		First period	02:51 – pp – Larry Robinson (3)
Dale Hunter (2) – 02:25; Alain Lemieux (2) – pp – 16:19; Brent Ashton (5) – 18:37		Second period	No scoring
Wilf Paiement (4) – 02:06		Third period	No scoring
Mario Gosselin 20 saves / 21 shots		Goalie stats	Steve Penney 12 saves / 16 shots Doug Soetaert 8 saves / 9 shots

April 30	Montreal Canadiens	5–2	Quebec Nordiques	Quebec Coliseum	Recap
Mike McPhee (4) – 00:45; Guy Carbonneau (4) – 13:26		First period	07:51 – Alain Lemieux (3)
Ron Flockhart (1) – 00:36; Chris Nilan (2) – pp – 07:11; Pierre Mondou (1) – 13:21		Second period	03:28 – Normand Rochefort (2)
No scoring		Third period	No scoring
Steve Penney 22 saves / 24 shots		Goalie stats	Mario Gosselin 22 saves / 27 shots

May 2	Quebec Nordiques	3–2	OT	Montreal Canadiens	Montreal Forum	Recap
Bruce Bell (2) – 03:27		First period		No scoring
Jean-Francois Sauve (3) – 01:24		Second period		07:23 – Pierre Mondou (2); 17:14 – Mats Naslund (7)
No scoring		Third period		No scoring
Peter Stastny (3) – 02:22		First overtime period		No scoring
Mario Gosselin 24 saves / 26 shots		Goalie stats		Steve Penney 22 saves / 25 shots

Quebec won series 4–3

==== (P1) Philadelphia Flyers vs. (P3) New York Islanders ====
This was the third playoff series meeting between these two teams. The teams had split their previous two meetings. The Islanders won the most recent meeting in six games in the 1980 Stanley Cup Final.

The Philadelphia Flyers ended the New York Islanders' string of five straight seasons in the Stanley Cup Final by dispatching the club four games to one. Flyers goaltender Pelle Lindbergh registered a pair of shutouts, one in the first game 3–0, and the other in the clinching fifth game by a 1–0 score.

April 18	New York Islanders	0–3	Philadelphia Flyers	Spectrum	Recap
No scoring		First period	No scoring
No scoring		Second period	04:10 – Rick Tocchet (1); 10:43 – Tim Kerr (6)
No scoring		Third period	16:24 – Ron Sutter (2)
Kelly Hrudey 35 saves / 38 shots		Goalie stats	Pelle Lindbergh 22 saves / 22 shots

April 21	New York Islanders	2–5	Philadelphia Flyers	Spectrum	Recap
No scoring		First period	02:15 – Ed Hospodar (1); 11:05 – pp – Brian Propp (1); 19:41 – Brian Propp (2)
Clark Gillies (1) – 19:06		Second period	15:47 – Brian Propp (3)
Bobby Nystrom (2) – 18:26		Third period	12:45 – Tim Kerr (7)
Billy Smith 31 saves / 36 shots		Goalie stats	Pelle Lindbergh 26 saves / 28 shots

April 23	Philadelphia Flyers	5–3	New York Islanders	Nassau Coliseum	Recap
Doug Crossman (2) – pp – 11:12; Rick Tocchet (2) – 18:44		First period	05:58 – Anders Kallur (2)
Ron Sutter (3) – 03:58; Brian Propp (4) – sh – 08:08		Second period	08:29 – pp – Brent Sutter (3); 19:22 – John Tonelli (1)
Ilkka Sinisalo (2) – en – 19:23		Third period	No scoring
Pelle Lindbergh 36 saves / 39 shots		Goalie stats	Billy Smith 11 saves / 15 shots Kelly Hrudey 5 saves / 5 shots

April 25	Philadelphia Flyers	2–6	New York Islanders	Nassau Coliseum	Recap
No scoring		First period	05:21 – Pat LaFontaine (1); 07:21 – pp – Bryan Trottier (4)
Derrick Smith (1) – 10:57		Second period	00:54 – Denis Potvin (3); 08:53 – Mike Bossy (5)
Tim Kerr (8) – pp – 15:53		Third period	09:23 – pp – Tomas Jonsson (1); 19:03 – pp – Alan Kerr (1)
Bob Froese 13 saves / 15 shots Pelle Lindbergh 8 saves / 12 shots		Goalie stats	Kelly Hrudey 24 saves / 26 shots

April 28	New York Islanders	0–1	Philadelphia Flyers	Spectrum	Recap
No scoring		First period	No scoring
No scoring		Second period	06:43 – Ilkka Sinisalo (3)
No scoring		Third period	No scoring
Kelly Hrudey 37 saves / 38 shots		Goalie stats	Pelle Lindbergh 25 saves / 25 shots

Philadelphia won series 4–1

=== Clarence Campbell Conference ===
==== (N2) Chicago Black Hawks vs. (N4) Minnesota North Stars ====
This was the fourth playoff series meeting between these two teams. Chicago won two of the previous three meetings over the past three seasons. Minnesota won last season's Norris Division Semifinals 3–2.

The Chicago Black Hawks simply outscored the Minnesota North Stars in an offensive-minded six-game series that featured 62 total goals.

April 18	Minnesota North Stars	8–5	Chicago Black Hawks	Chicago Stadium	Recap
Dennis Maruk (1) – pp – 07:05; Willi Plett (3) – 07:27		First period	03:07 – Eddie Olczyk (4); 03:56 – Doug Wilson (3); 05:42 – Tom Lysiak (1)
Tony McKegney (2) – pp – 07:40; Neal Broten (2) – 11:03; Brian Bellows (1) – 13:07; Tim Coulis (1) – 14:19		Second period	No scoring
Steve Payne (1) – 04:42; Tony McKegney (3) – en – 19:55		Third period	04:11 – Jack O'Callahan (2); 15:04 – Behn Wilson (3)
Gilles Meloche 42 saves / 47 shots		Goalie stats	Murray Bannerman 30 saves / 37 shots

April 21	Minnesota North Stars	2–6	Chicago Black Hawks	Chicago Stadium	Recap
No scoring		First period	No scoring
Dino Ciccarelli (1) – 02:48; Tony McKegney (4) – 04:07		Second period	01:12 – Keith Brown (2); 01:27 – Ken Yaremchuk (3); 04:18 – Curt Fraser (3); 10:53 – Curt Fraser (4); 14:07 – Al Secord (2)
No scoring		Third period	18:42 – Troy Murray (1)
Gilles Meloche 35 saves / 41 shots		Goalie stats	Murray Bannerman 25 saves / 27 shots

April 23	Chicago Black Hawks	5–3	Minnesota North Stars	Met Center	Recap
Bob Murray (1) – pp – 13:55; Tom Lysiak (2) – 18:19		First period	03:07 – pp – Dennis Maruk (2); 09:36 – pp – Dino Ciccarelli (2)
Al Secord (3) – 17:10; Al Secord (4) – en – 19:18		Second period	No scoring
Darryl Sutter (3) – 19:47		Third period	05:40 – pp – Craig Hartsburg (3)
Murray Bannerman 38 saves / 41 shots		Goalie stats	Gilles Meloche 18 saves / 22 shots Don Beaupre 7 saves / 7 shots

April 25	Chicago Black Hawks	7–6	2OT	Minnesota North Stars	Met Center	Recap
Steve Larmer (3) – pp – 01:11; Denis Savard (4) – 10:58; Eddie Olczyk (5) – pp – 13:47		First period		08:53 – pp – Ron Wilson (1); 11:14 – Randy Velischek (1)
Tom Lysiak (3) – 11:25		Second period		16:06 – Craig Hartsburg (4); 19:27 – Randy Velischek (2)
Bill Gardner (1) – 09:15; Denis Savard (5) – 12:32		Third period		02:58 – Gordie Roberts (1); 11:45 – pp – Tony McKegney (5)
Darryl Sutter (4) – 01:57		Second overtime period		No scoring
Murray Bannerman 48 saves / 54 shots		Goalie stats		Don Beaupre 13 saves / 19 shots Gilles Meloche 15 saves / 16 shots

April 28	Minnesota North Stars	5–4	OT	Chicago Black Hawks	Chicago Stadium	Recap
No scoring		First period		03:32 – Denis Savard (6); 19:54 – Darryl Sutter (5)
Tony McKegney (6) – 10:28; Brian Bellows (2) – sh – 16:01		Second period		02:24 – Al Secord (5); 09:08 – Steve Larmer (4)
Dino Ciccarelli (3) – 12:53; Tony McKegney (7) – 16:43		Third period		No scoring
Dennis Maruk (3) – 01:14		First overtime period		No scoring
Gilles Meloche 15 saves / 19 shots Don Beaupre 16 saves / 16 shots		Goalie stats		Murray Bannerman 32 saves / 37 shots

April 30	Chicago Black Hawks	6–5	OT	Minnesota North Stars	Met Center	Recap
Steve Larmer (5) – pp – 02:25; Darryl Sutter (6) – 17:14		First period		01:30 – Tony McKegney (8); 12:57 – pp – Craig Hartsburg (5)
Tom Lysiak (4) – 11:41		Second period		08:41 – pp – Dennis Maruk (4)
Curt Fraser (5) – 06:15; Troy Murray (2) – 15:03		Third period		04:31 – Dave Richter (1); 09:41 – pp – Keith Acton (4)
Darryl Sutter (7) – 15:41		First overtime period		No scoring
Murray Bannerman 41 saves / 46 shots		Goalie stats		Don Beaupre 31 saves / 37 shots

Chicago won series 4–2

==== (S1) Edmonton Oilers vs. (S2) Winnipeg Jets ====
This was the third playoff series meeting between these two teams. Edmonton won the previous two meetings over the past two seasons, including last year's Smythe Division Semifinals in a three-game sweep.

Defending Cup champion Edmonton was too much for the Winnipeg Jets, sweeping them in four straight games and doubling their goal total.

April 18	Winnipeg Jets	2–4	Edmonton Oilers	Northlands Coliseum	Recap
Bengt Lundholm (1) – sh – 13:49		First period	11:45 – Jari Kurri (3)
Paul MacLean (2) – 07:28		Second period	07:43 – Mark Napier (3)
No scoring		Third period	06:42 – Paul Coffey; 19:36 – en – Wayne Gretzky (1)
Marc Behrend 30 saves / 33 shots		Goalie stats	Grant Fuhr 21 saves / 23 shots

April 20	Winnipeg Jets	2–5	Edmonton Oilers	Northlands Coliseum	Recap
Robert Picard (1) – pp – 10:17		First period	08:21 – pp – Wayne Gretzky (2); 11:33 – Kevin McClelland (1); 13:11 – pp – Paul Coffey (4)
No scoring		Second period	01:33 – sh – Paul Coffey (5)
Thomas Steen (2) – pp – 13:52		Third period	04:06 – Mark Messier (3)
Brian Hayward 26 saves / 31 shots		Goalie stats	Grant Fuhr 30 saves / 32 shots

April 23	Edmonton Oilers	5–4	Winnipeg Jets	Winnipeg Arena	Recap
Paul Coffey (6) – 04:39		First period	01:26 – pp – Paul MacLean (3); 13:25 – sh – Bengt Lundholm (2)
Glenn Anderson (2) – 00:37; Mike Krushelnyski (2) – pp – 03:54; Mark Napier (4) – 14:53		Second period	08:25 – Ron Wilson (3); 19:45 – pp – Dave Babych (2)
Wayne Gretzky (3) – 06:13		Third period	No scoring
Grant Fuhr 28 saves / 32 shots		Goalie stats	Brian Hayward 20 saves / 25 shots

April 25	Edmonton Oilers	8–3	Winnipeg Jets	Winnipeg Arena	Recap
Wayne Gretzky (4) – 05:20; Wayne Gretzky (5) – sh – 12:22		First period	00:53 – pp – Randy Carlyle (1)
Jari Kurri (4) – 00:54; Jari Kurri (5) – 01:18; Glenn Anderson (3) – pp – 08:18		Second period	09:50 – Robert Picard (2); 14:00 – Ron Wilson (4)
Mark Messier (4) – 03:29; Jari Kurri (6) – 05:35; Wayne Gretzky (6) – sh-en – 10:31		Third period	No scoring
Grant Fuhr 26 saves / 29 shots Andy Moog 2 saves / 2 shots		Goalie stats	Brian Hayward 10 saves / 15 shots Marc Behrend 11 saves / 13 shots

Edmonton won series 4–0

== Conference finals ==
=== Prince of Wales Conference final ===
==== (P1) Philadelphia Flyers vs. (A2) Quebec Nordiques ====
This was the second playoff series meeting between these two teams. Philadelphia won the only previous meeting 3–2 in the 1981 Preliminary round.

Although the Flyers held the best record in the NHL with 53 wins and 113 points, the Adams Division held a better record against the Patrick Division, so the Wales finals began in Quebec City. Philadelphia and Quebec split the first four games of the series, then the Flyers edged the Nordiques, 2–1 in game five. Game six in Philadelphia was a tour-de-force for the Flyers, outshooting Quebec 36–15, and winning 3–0. Flyers captain Dave Poulin's five-on-three shorthanded goal early in the second period sealed the win and returned Philadelphia to the Stanley Cup Final for the first time since 1980. The win came at a high cost for the Flyers as both 54-goal forward Tim Kerr and defenceman Brad McCrimmon were lost for the remainder of the playoffs with injuries.

May 5	Philadelphia Flyers	1–2	OT	Quebec Nordiques	Quebec Coliseum	Recap
No scoring		First period		No scoring
No scoring		Second period		No scoring
Brad McCrimmon (2) – 13:02		Third period		07:13 – Dale Hunter (3)
No scoring		First overtime period		06:20 – Peter Stastny (4)
Pelle Lindbergh 42 saves / 44 shots		Goalie stats		Mario Gosselin 27 saves / 28 shots

May 7	Philadelphia Flyers	4–2	Quebec Nordiques	Quebec Coliseum	Recap
Dave Poulin (1) – sh – 11:16		First period	No scoring
Murray Craven (1) – 02:18; Ilkka Sinisalo (4) – 19:39		Second period	No scoring
Joe Paterson (1) – 11:51		Third period	04:51 – pp – Jean-Francois Sauve (4); 19:41 – Mark Kumpel (2)
Pelle Lindbergh 27 saves / 29 shots		Goalie stats	Mario Gosselin 21 saves / 25 shots

May 9	Quebec Nordiques	2–4	Philadelphia Flyers	Spectrum	Recap
Alain Cote (3) – 12:34; Brent Ashton (6) – sh – 18:54		First period	12:13 – pp – Murray Craven (2)
No scoring		Second period	01:41 – Joe Paterson (2); 11:39 – pp – Ilkka Sinisalo (5)
No scoring		Third period	12:46 – pp – Brian Propp (5)
Mario Gosselin 31 saves / 35 shots		Goalie stats	Pelle Lindbergh 21 saves / 23 shots

May 12	Quebec Nordiques	5–3	Philadelphia Flyers	Spectrum	Recap
Dale Hunter (4) – sh – 06:29; Alain Cote (4) – 09:23		First period	No scoring
Mark Kumpel (3) – 17:07		Second period	03:12 – pp – Doug Crossman (3); 19:07 – pp – Brian Propp (6)
Alain Cote (5) – 04:32; Brad Maxwell (2) – pp – 12:37		Third period	03:08 – pp – Mark Howe (2)
Mario Gosselin 34 saves / 37 shots		Goalie stats	Pelle Lindbergh 16 saves / 21 shots

May 14	Philadelphia Flyers	2–1	Quebec Nordiques	Quebec Coliseum	Recap
No scoring		First period	No scoring
No scoring		Second period	07:02 – pp – Jean-Francois Sauve (5)
Joe Paterson (3) – pp – 01:00; Murray Craven (3) – 15:01		Third period	No scoring
Pelle Lindbergh 30 saves / 31 shots		Goalie stats	Mario Gosselin 19 saves / 21 shots

May 16	Quebec Nordiques	0–3	Philadelphia Flyers	Spectrum	Recap
No scoring		First period	16:32 – Rick Tocchet (3)
No scoring		Second period	02:11 – sh – Dave Poulin (2); 11:07 – pp – Doug Crossman (4)
No scoring		Third period	No scoring
Mario Gosselin 33 saves / 36 shots		Goalie stats	Pelle Lindbergh 15 saves / 15 shots

Philadelphia won series 4–2

=== Clarence Campbell Conference final ===
==== (S1) Edmonton Oilers vs. (N2) Chicago Black Hawks ====
This was the second playoff series meeting between these two teams. Edmonton won the only previous meeting in a four-game sweep in the 1983 Clarence Campbell Conference Final.

The Oilers defeated the Black Hawks in six games, with the home team winning the first five games. This was a six-game series that broke all sorts of records for total offense. Edmonton won the first two games at home by 11–2 and 7–3 scores, only to see Chicago strike back at home with 5–2 and 8–6 victories. However, Edmonton rebounded to blast the Hawks in the final two games, 10–5 and 8–2 to earn their third trip to the Cup Final in as many years. Edmonton set all-time playoff marks with the most goals in one series, and most goals in a six-game series, and both clubs set records with the most total goals in a semifinal series and the most total goals in one six-game series. Oilers' Jari Kurri scored three hat tricks in the series, setting a still-standing NHL record.

May 4	Chicago Black Hawks	2–11	Edmonton Oilers	Northlands Coliseum	Recap
Ken Yaremchuk (4) – 12:36		First period	05:48 – Glenn Anderson (4); 10:09 – Charlie Huddy (1); 18:25 – Paul Coffey (7)
No scoring		Second period	03:38 – Jari Kurri (7); 05:18 – pp – Mark Napier (5); 14:58 – sh – Jari Kurri (8); 18:57 – Charlie Huddy (2)
Troy Murray (3) – 18:22		Third period	01:17 – Willy Lindstrom (1); 10:49 – Wayne Gretzky (7); 11:25 – Pat Hughes (1); 12:43 – Glenn Anderson (5)
Murray Bannerman 21 saves / 28 shots Warren Skorodenski 10 saves / 14 shots		Goalie stats	Grant Fuhr 26 saves / 28 shots

May 7	Chicago Black Hawks	3–7	Edmonton Oilers	Northlands Coliseum	Recap
Bob Murray (2) – 06:34		First period	06:21 – pp – Glenn Anderson (6); 12:26 – Jari Kurri (9)
Darryl Sutter (8) – 05:49		Second period	07:19 – Larry Melnyk (1)
Behn Wilson (4) – 19:22		Third period	08:26 – Jari Kurri (10); 15:45 – Paul Coffey (8); 19:36 – en – Jari Kurri (11); 19:43 – en – Glenn Anderson (7)
Murray Bannerman 30 saves / 35 shots		Goalie stats	Grant Fuhr 28 saves / 31 shots

May 9	Edmonton Oilers	2–5	Chicago Black Hawks	Chicago Stadium	Recap
No scoring		First period	05:01 – Jack O'Callahan (3); 06:02 – Steve Larmer (6)
Jaroslav Pouzar (1) – 11:14		Second period	14:20 – Darryl Sutter (9)
Mark Messier (5) – 03:07		Third period	07:07 – Denis Savard (7); 18:44 – en – Troy Murray (4)
Grant Fuhr 28 saves / 32 shots		Goalie stats	Murray Bannerman 33 saves / 35 shots

May 12	Edmonton Oilers	6–8	Chicago Black Hawks	Chicago Stadium	Recap
Wayne Gretzky (8) – 02:52; Mark Messier (6) – 11:02; Jaroslav Pouzar (2) – 17:20		First period	04:23 – Darryl Sutter (10); 09:50 – sh – Eddie Olczyk (6); 17:05 – Denis Savard (8); 18:17 – Curt Fraser (6); 19:35 – pp – Al Secord (6)
Willy Lindstrom (2) – 10:20		Second period	12:57 – pp – Steve Larmer (7)
Glenn Anderson (8) – 16:41; Mark Messier (7) – 17:45		Third period	04:52 – Steve Larmer (8); 05:24 – Bob Murray (3)
Grant Fuhr 16 saves / 24 shots Andy Moog 1 save / 1 shot		Goalie stats	Murray Bannerman 29 saves / 35 shots

May 14	Chicago Black Hawks	5–10	Edmonton Oilers	Northlands Coliseum	Recap
Troy Murray (5) – pp – 04:37; Darryl Sutter (11) – pp – 09:15; Steve Larmer (9) – pp – 14:13		First period	01:11 – Mike Krushelnyski (3); 07:52 – pp – Jari Kurri (12); 16:31 – Jari Kurri (13)
Denis Savard (9) – pp – 04:30		Second period	04:51 – Mark Messier (8); 08:15 – Wayne Gretzky (9); 16:46 – pp – Wayne Gretzky (10); 18:39 – Jari Kurri (14)
Darryl Sutter (12) – pp – 18:37		Third period	02:40 – Paul Coffey (9); 11:57 – Dave Hunter (1); 15:43 – Lee Fogolin Jr. (2)
Murray Bannerman 41 saves / 51 shots		Goalie stats	Grant Fuhr 18 saves / 23 shots

May 16	Edmonton Oilers	8–2	Chicago Black Hawks	Chicago Stadium	Recap
Jari Kurri (15) – 05:12; Mark Messier (9) – 13:26		First period	No scoring
Mark Messier (10) – pp – 08:32; Jari Kurri (16) – 13:28; Lee Fogolin Jr. (3) – 14:41; Jari Kurri (17) – sh – 18:05		Second period	No scoring
Glenn Anderson (9) – 15:54; Jari Kurri (18) – 18:17		Third period	07:27 – Al Secord (7); 13:34 – Ken Yaremchuk (5)
Grant Fuhr 25 saves / 27 shots		Goalie stats	Murray Bannerman 19 saves / 27 shots

Edmonton won series 4–2

== Stanley Cup Final ==
This was the second playoff series between these two teams. Their only previous meeting was in the 1980 Preliminary round, which Philadelphia won in a three-game sweep. Philadelphia made their fifth Final appearance. They last appeared in the Final in 1980, which Philadelphia lost against the New York Islanders in six games. This was Edmonton's third consecutive and third overall Final appearance. They won the previous year's Final against the New York Islanders in five games. Philadelphia won all three games in this year's regular season series.

May 21	Edmonton Oilers	1–4	Philadelphia Flyers	Spectrum	Recap
No scoring		First period	15:05 – pp – Ilkka Sinisalo (6)
No scoring		Second period	No scoring
Willy Lindstrom (3) – 16:52		Third period	05:56 – Ron Sutter (4); 08:07 – Tim Kerr (9); 19:39 – en – Dave Poulin (3)
Grant Fuhr 37 saves / 40 shots		Goalie stats	Pelle Lindbergh 25 saves / 26 shots

May 23	Edmonton Oilers	3–1	Philadelphia Flyers	Spectrum	Recap
Wayne Gretzky (11) – 10:29		First period	No scoring
Willy Lindstrom (4) – 16:08		Second period	10:22 – Tim Kerr (10)
Dave Hunter (2) – en – 19:33		Third period	No scoring
Grant Fuhr 17 saves / 18 shots		Goalie stats	Pelle Lindbergh 27 saves / 29 shots

May 25	Philadelphia Flyers	3–4	Edmonton Oilers	Northlands Coliseum	Recap
Derrick Smith (2) – 01:41		First period	01:10 – Wayne Gretzky (12); 01:25 – Wayne Gretzky (13); 13:32 – Wayne Gretzky (14)
No scoring		Second period	06:58 – pp – Mike Krushelnyski (4)
Mark Howe (3) – 09:08; Brian Propp (7) – 14:26		Third period	No scoring
Pelle Lindbergh 15 saves / 19 shots Bob Froese 7 saves / 7 shots		Goalie stats	Grant Fuhr 27 saves / 30 shots

May 28	Philadelphia Flyers	3–5	Edmonton Oilers	Northlands Coliseum	Recap
Rich Sutter (1) – 00:46; Todd Bergen (4) – pp – 06:38; Murray Craven (4) – sh – 11:32		First period	04:22 – pp – Paul Coffey (10); 18:23 – pp – Charlie Huddy (3)
No scoring		Second period	00:21 – Glenn Anderson (10); 12:53 – pp – Wayne Gretzky (15)
No scoring		Third period	03:42 – pp – Wayne Gretzky (16)
Pelle Lindbergh 18 saves / 22 shots Bob Froese 9 saves / 10 shots		Goalie stats	Grant Fuhr 20 saves / 23 shots

May 30	Philadelphia Flyers	3–8	Edmonton Oilers	Northlands Coliseum	Recap
Rich Sutter (2) – 07:23		First period	04:54 – Jari Kurri (19); 05:31 – Willy Lindstrom (5); 15:31 – Paul Coffey (11); 17:57 – pp – Paul Coffey (12)
No scoring		Second period	09:18 – Mark Messier (11); 10:20 – Mike Krushelnyski (5); 16:49 – Wayne Gretzky (17)
Brian Propp (8) – pp – 01:59; Rich Sutter (3) – 07:05		Third period	03:39 – Mark Messier (12)
Bob Froese 33 saves / 41 shots		Goalie stats	Grant Fuhr 19 saves / 22 shots

Edmonton won series 4–1

== Player statistics ==
=== Skaters ===
These are the top ten skaters based on points.

Player	Team	GP	G	A	Pts	+/–	PIM
Wayne Gretzky	Edmonton Oilers	18	17	30	47	+27	4
Paul Coffey	Edmonton Oilers	18	12	25	37	+23	44
Jari Kurri	Edmonton Oilers	18	19	12	31	+23	6
Denis Savard	Chicago Black Hawks	15	9	20	29	+4	20
Glenn Anderson	Edmonton Oilers	18	10	16	26	+11	38
Mark Messier	Edmonton Oilers	18	12	13	25	+14	12
Peter Stastny	Quebec Nordiques	18	4	19	23	+2	24
Steve Larmer	Chicago Black Hawks	15	9	13	22	+1	14
Michel Goulet	Quebec Nordiques	17	11	10	21	0	17
Charlie Huddy	Edmonton Oilers	18	3	17	20	+21	17

=== Goaltenders ===
This is a combined table of the top five goaltenders based on goals against average and the top five goaltenders based on save percentage, with at least 420 minutes played. The table is sorted by GAA, and the criteria for inclusion are bolded.

Player	Team	GP	W	L	SA	GA	GAA	SV%	SO	TOI
Pelle Lindbergh	Philadelphia Flyers	18	12	6	487	42	**2.50**	**.914**	3	1006:43
Mario Gosselin	Quebec Nordiques	17	9	8	471	54	**3.07**	**.885**	0	1056:07
Grant Fuhr	Edmonton Oilers	18	15	3	520	55	**3.10**	**.894**	0	1063:15
Steve Penney	Montreal Canadiens	12	6	6	300	40	**3.28**	**.867**	1	732:08
Murray Bannerman	Chicago Black Hawks	15	9	6	544	72	**4.79**	**.868**	0	902:34

== See also ==
- 1984–85 NHL season
- List of NHL seasons
- List of Stanley Cup champions

Preceded by 1984 Stanley Cup playoffs	Stanley Cup playoffs	Succeeded by 1986 Stanley Cup playoffs
