= 1984 Stanley Cup playoffs =

Tournament details
- Dates: April 4–May 19, 1984
- Teams: 16
- Defending champions: New York Islanders

Final positions
- Champions: Edmonton Oilers
- Runners-up: New York Islanders

Tournament statistics
- Scoring leader(s): Wayne Gretzky (Oilers) (35 points)

Awards
- MVP: Mark Messier (Oilers)

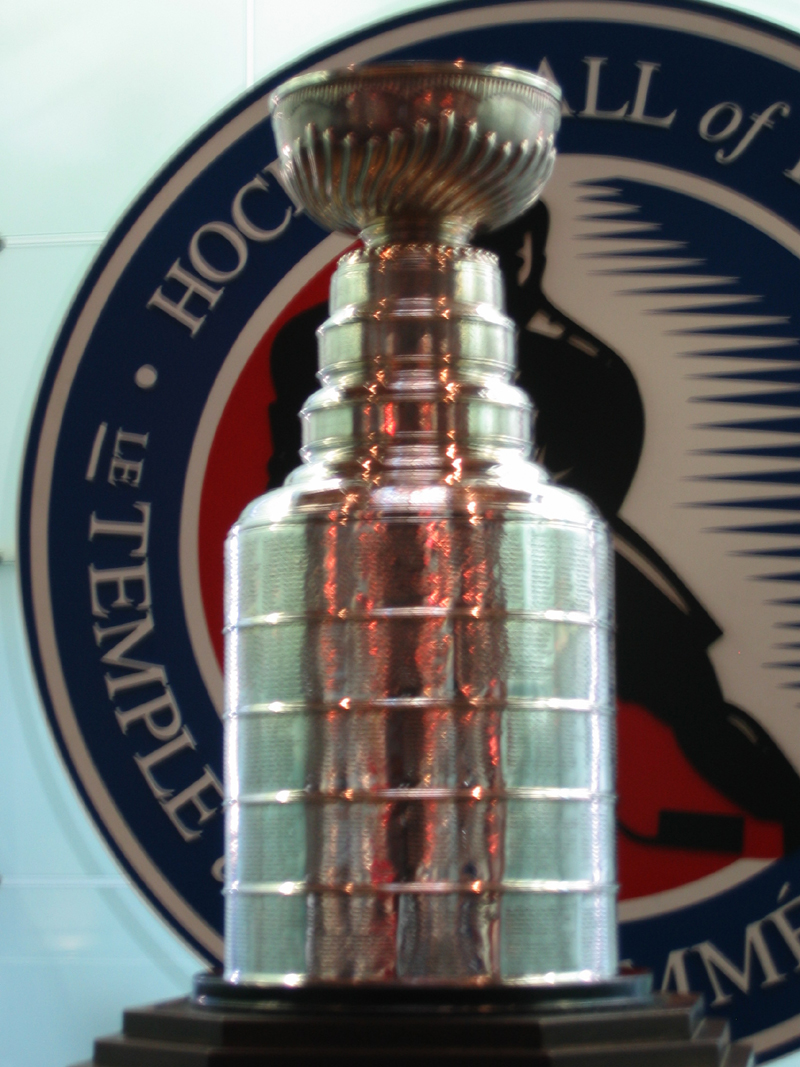
The Stanley Cup

The 1984 Stanley Cup playoffs, the playoff tournament of the National Hockey League (NHL) began on April 4, after the conclusion of the 1983–84 NHL season. The playoffs concluded on May 19 with the Edmonton Oilers defeating the four-time defending champion New York Islanders 5–2 to win the Stanley Cup Final four games to one, the franchise's first Stanley Cup.

== Playoff seeds ==
The top four teams in each division qualified for the playoffs, as follows:

=== Prince of Wales Conference ===
==== Adams Division ====
1. Boston Bruins, Adams Division champions – 104 points (49 wins)
2. Buffalo Sabres – 103 points
3. Quebec Nordiques – 94 points
4. Montreal Canadiens – 75 points

==== Patrick Division ====
1. New York Islanders, Patrick Division champions, Prince of Wales Conference regular season champions – 104 points (50 wins)
2. Washington Capitals – 101 points
3. Philadelphia Flyers – 98 points
4. New York Rangers – 93 points

=== Clarence Campbell Conference ===
==== Norris Division ====
1. Minnesota North Stars, Norris Division champions – 88 points
2. St. Louis Blues – 71 points
3. Detroit Red Wings – 69 points
4. Chicago Black Hawks – 68 points

==== Smythe Division ====
1. Edmonton Oilers, Smythe Division champions, Clarence Campbell Conference regular season champions – 119 points
2. Calgary Flames – 82 points
3. Vancouver Canucks – 73 points (32 wins)
4. Winnipeg Jets – 73 points (31 wins)

== Playoff bracket ==
In the division semifinals, the fourth seeded team in each division played against the division winner from their division. The other series matched the second and third place teams from the divisions. The two winning teams from each division's semifinals then met in the division finals. The two division winners of each conference then played in the conference finals. The two conference winners then advanced to the Stanley Cup Final.

Home ice advantage in the conference finals and the Stanley Cup Final was modified this season so it would be awarded to the team whose division (conference finals) or conference (Stanley Cup Final) had the better record against the other during the regular season, instead of having it rotate by division and conference, respectively. This resulted in home-ice advantage for the Adams and Smythe division champions in the conference finals and resulted in home-ice advantage for the Wales Conference champion in the Stanley Cup Final.

Each division semifinals series was competed in a best-of-five playoff following a 2–2–1 format (scores in the bracket indicate the number of games won in each series), with the team with home ice advantage playing at home for games one and two (and game five, if necessary), and the other team playing at home for game three (and game four, if necessary). In the middle two rounds, each series was competed in a best-of-seven playoff following a 2–2–1–1–1 format, with the team with home ice advantage playing at home for games one and two (and games five and seven, if necessary), and the other team playing at home for games three and four (and game six, if necessary). The Stanley Cup Final was changed from a 2–2–1–1–1 format to a 2–3–2 format this season, with the sites for games five and six switched.

Division semifinals	Division finals
A1	Boston	0
A4	Montreal	3
A4	Montreal	4
A3	Quebec	2
A2	Buffalo	0
A3	Quebec	3
Prince of Wales Conference
P1	NY Islanders	3
P4	NY Rangers	2
P1	NY Islanders	4
P2	Washington	1
P2	Washington	3
P3	Philadelphia	0
N1	Minnesota	3
N4	Chicago	2
N1	Minnesota	4
N2	St. Louis	3
N2	St. Louis	3
N3	Detroit	1
Clarence Campbell Conference
S1	Edmonton	3
S4	Winnipeg	0
S1	Edmonton	4
S2	Calgary	3
S2	Calgary	3
S3	Vancouver	1

Conference finals
A4	Montreal	2
P1	NY Islanders	4
N1	Minnesota	0
S1	Edmonton	4

Stanley Cup Final
P1	NY Islanders	1
S1	Edmonton	4

== Division semifinals ==
=== Prince of Wales Conference ===
==== (A1) Boston Bruins vs. (A4) Montreal Canadiens ====
This was the 19th playoff series between these two teams. Montreal lead 16–2 in previous playoff meetings. Montreal won the most recent meeting in seven games in the 1979 Stanley Cup Semifinals.

April 4	Montreal Canadiens	2–1	Boston Bruins	Boston Garden	Recap
No scoring		First period	No scoring
Chris Chelios (1) – pp – 10:12		Second period	16:37 – Tom Fergus (1)
Bobby Smith (1) – 14:01		Third period	No scoring
Steve Penney 29 saves / 30 shots		Goalie stats	Pete Peeters 19 saves / 21 shots

April 5	Montreal Canadiens	3–1	Boston Bruins	Boston Garden	Recap
Mario Tremblay (1) – 00:16; Mats Naslund (1) – pp – 10:39		First period	19:51 – pp – Tom Fergus (2)
No scoring		Second period	No scoring
Guy Carbonneau (1) – 19:04		Third period	No scoring
Steve Penney 26 saves / 27 shots		Goalie stats	Pete Peeters 21 saves / 24 shots

April 7	Boston Bruins	0–5	Montreal Canadiens	Montreal Forum	Recap
No scoring		First period	00:46 – Mario Tremblay (2); 03:21 – Pierre Mondou (1)
No scoring		Second period	08:55 – Bob Gainey (1); 09:06 – Mario Tremblay (3); 13:55 – Mike McPhee (1)
No scoring		Third period	No scoring
Pete Peeters 18 saves / 23 shots		Goalie stats	Steve Penney 19 saves / 19 shots

Montreal won series 3–0

==== (A2) Buffalo Sabres vs. (A3) Quebec Nordiques ====
This was the first playoff series meeting between these two teams.

April 4	Quebec Nordiques	3–2	Buffalo Sabres	Buffalo Memorial Auditorium	Recap
No scoring		First period	16:32 – Lindy Ruff (1)
Normand Rochefort (1) – 05:13; Bo Berglund (1) – 15:03; Marian Stastny (1) – 15:49		Second period	06:30 – John Tucker (1)
No scoring		Third period	No scoring
Dan Bouchard 24 saves / 26 shots		Goalie stats	Tom Barrasso 19 saves / 22 shots Bob Sauve 0 saves / 0 shots

April 5	Quebec Nordiques	6–2	Buffalo Sabres	Buffalo Memorial Auditorium	Recap
Dale Hunter (1) – 04:04; Michel Goulet (1) – 14:16		First period	No scoring
Andre Savard (1) – sh – 03:47; Anton Stastny (1) – 06:21; Dale Hunter (2) – 13:05		Second period	07:35 – Mike Foligno (1); 07:49 – Sean McKenna (1)
Wilf Paiement (1) – 17:08		Third period	No scoring
Dan Bouchard 34 saves / 36 shots		Goalie stats	Bob Sauve 9 saves / 14 shots Tom Barrasso 5 saves / 6 shots

April 7	Buffalo Sabres	1–4	Quebec Nordiques	Quebec Coliseum	Recap
Mike Foligno (2) – 09:14		First period	03:25 – Mario Marois (1); 18:45 – pp – Jean-Francois Sauve (1)
No scoring		Second period	01:28 – pp – Peter Stastny (1); 19:15 – sh – Andre Savard (2)
No scoring		Third period	No scoring
Tom Barrasso 27 saves / 31 shots		Goalie stats	Dan Bouchard 20 saves / 21 shots

Quebec won series 3–0

==== (P1) New York Islanders vs. (P4) New York Rangers ====
This was the sixth playoff series meeting between these two teams. The Islanders won four of the previous five meetings, including in each of the past three seasons. The Islanders won in six games in last year's Patrick Division Finals.

April 4	New York Rangers	1–4	New York Islanders	Nassau Coliseum	Recap
Jan Erixon (1) – 02:49		First period	No scoring
No scoring		Second period	16:20 – Pat Flatley (1); 17:13 – Bob Bourne (1)
No scoring		Third period	02:12 – Greg Gilbert (1); 03:28 – Pat LaFontaine (1)
Glen Hanlon 24 saves / 28 shots		Goalie stats	Billy Smith 33 saves / 34 shots

April 5	New York Rangers	3–0	New York Islanders	Nassau Coliseum	Recap
Reijo Ruotsalainen (1) – pp – 05:08		First period	No scoring
Peter Sundstrom (1) – pp – 04:02		Second period	No scoring
Mark Pavelich (1) – 06:06		Third period	No scoring
Glen Hanlon 45 saves / 45 shots		Goalie stats	Billy Smith 15 saves / 18 shots

April 7	New York Islanders	2–7	New York Rangers	Madison Square Garden	Recap
No scoring		First period	05:28 – sh – Mark Pavelich (2); 19:32 – pp – Pierre Larouche (1)
Duane Sutter (1) – 17:30		Second period	02:05 – Jan Erixon (2); 05:41 – Pierre Larouche (2); 09:59 – Barry Beck (1); 15:33 – Willie Huber (1)
Clark Gillies (1) – 06:13		Third period	04:57 – Anders Hedberg (1)
Billy Smith 13 saves / 18 shots Roland Melanson 7 saves / 9 shots		Goalie stats	Glen Hanlon 26 saves / 28 shots

April 8	New York Islanders	4–1	New York Rangers	Madison Square Garden	Recap
No scoring		First period	No scoring
No scoring		Second period	05:26 – pp – Pierre Larouche (3)
John Tonelli (1) – 00:49; Brent Sutter (1) – 11:04; Clark Gillies (2) – 17:41; Bryan Trottier (1) – 19:46		Third period	No scoring
Billy Smith 27 saves / 28 shots		Goalie stats	Glen Hanlon 36 saves / 40 shots

April 10	New York Rangers	2–3	OT	New York Islanders	Nassau Coliseum	Recap
Ron Greschner (1) – 12:06		First period		19:49 – Mike Bossy (1)
No scoring		Second period		No scoring
Don Maloney (1) – 19:21		Third period		07:56 – Tomas Jonsson (1)
No scoring		First overtime period		08:56 – Ken Morrow (1)
Glen Hanlon 22 saves / 25 shots John Vanbiesbrouck 0 saves / 0 shots		Goalie stats		Billy Smith 42 saves / 44 shots

New York Islanders won series 3–2

==== (P2) Washington Capitals vs. (P3) Philadelphia Flyers ====
This was the first playoff series meeting between these two teams.

April 4	Philadelphia Flyers	2–4	Washington Capitals	Capital Centre	Recap
Bobby Clarke (1) – 05:21		First period	13:57 – Craig Laughlin (1)
Ilkka Sinisalo (1) – pp – 04:51		Second period	09:32 – Bryan Erickson (1)
No scoring		Third period	07:37 – Gaetan Duchesne (1); 10:16 – Mike Gartner (1)
Bob Froese 22 saves / 26 shots Pelle Lindbergh 0 saves / 0 shots		Goalie stats	Pat Riggin 19 saves / 21 shots

April 5	Philadelphia Flyers	2–6	Washington Capitals	Capital Centre	Recap
Brad Marsh (1) – 14:05; Bobby Clarke (2) – 17:21		First period	15:28 – pp – Mike Gartner (2)
No scoring		Second period	04:55 – Alan Haworth (1)
No scoring		Third period	02:53 – Craig Laughlin (2); 03:25 – Dave Christian (1); 12:01 – pp – Bryan Erickson (2); 18:29 – en – Doug Jarvis (1)
Bob Froese 26 saves / 31 shots		Goalie stats	Al Jensen 30 saves / 32 shots

April 7	Washington Capitals	5–1	Philadelphia Flyers	Spectrum	Recap
Glen Currie (1) – 08:47; Craig Laughlin (3) – pp – 17:57		First period	No scoring
Gary Sampson (1) – 01:52; Dave Christian (2) – 17:06; Gaetan Duchesne (2) – 18:43		Second period	No scoring
No scoring		Third period	06:40 – Ilkka Sinisalo (2)
Al Jensen 37 saves / 38 shots		Goalie stats	Pelle Lindbergh 10 saves / 13 shots Bob Froese 17 saves / 19 shots

Washington won series 3–0

=== Clarence Campbell Conference ===
==== (N1) Minnesota North Stars vs. (N4) Chicago Black Hawks ====
This was the third playoff series meeting between these two teams. Chicago won both previous meetings over the past two seasons, including last year's Norris Division Finals in five games.

April 4	Chicago Black Hawks	3–1	Minnesota North Stars	Met Center	Recap
No scoring		First period	No scoring
No scoring		Second period	05:58 – Lars Lindgren (1)
Al Secord (1) – 01:09; Al Secord (2) – 11:25; Bob Murray (1) – en – 19:56		Third period	No scoring
Murray Bannerman 34 saves / 35 shots		Goalie stats	Gilles Meloche 23 saves / 25 shots

April 5	Chicago Black Hawks	5–6	Minnesota North Stars	Met Center	Recap
No scoring		First period	13:02 – pp – Gordie Roberts (1); 16:41 – pp – Curt Giles (1)
Jeff Larmer (1) – pp – 00:42; Steve Larmer (1) – pp – 05:21; Rick Paterson (1) – sh – 07:48		Second period	12:53 – Keith Acton (1)
Denis Savard (1) – 10:53; Darryl Sutter (1) – 16:01		Third period	05:53 – Al MacAdam (1); 09:47 – pp – Willi Plett (1); 12:30 – Neal Broten (1)
Murray Bannerman 37 saves / 43 shots		Goalie stats	Gilles Meloche 18 saves / 23 shots

April 7	Minnesota North Stars	4–1	Chicago Black Hawks	Chicago Stadium	Recap
Lars Lindgren (2) – 08:20; Keith Acton (2) – 16:23		First period	No scoring
Brent Ashton (1) – 05:38		Second period	10:28 – Bob Murray (2)
George Ferguson (1) – 04:36		Third period	No scoring
Don Beaupre 19 saves / 20 shots		Goalie stats	Murray Bannerman 25 saves / 29 shots

April 8	Minnesota North Stars	3–4	Chicago Black Hawks	Chicago Stadium	Recap
Dino Ciccarelli (1) – pp – 13:06		First period	14:14 – Steve Larmer (2)
Gordie Roberts (2) – 14:39		Second period	10:02 – Tom Lysiak (1)
Brad Maxwell (1) – pp – 02:21		Third period	12:52 – Al Secord (3); 14:09 – Troy Murray (1)
Don Beaupre 27 saves / 31 shots		Goalie stats	Murray Bannerman 20 saves / 23 shots

April 10	Chicago Black Hawks	1–4	Minnesota North Stars	Met Center	Recap
No scoring		First period	02:50 – sh – Dennis Maruk (1); 11:52 – George Ferguson (2)
Bob Murray (3) – pp – 00:53		Second period	14:59 – Dino Ciccarelli (2)
No scoring		Third period	19:36 – en – Dennis Maruk (2)
Murray Bannerman 37 saves / 40 shots		Goalie stats	Don Beaupre 20 saves / 21 shots

Minnesota won series 3–2

==== (N2) St. Louis Blues vs. (N3) Detroit Red Wings ====
This was the first playoff series meeting between these two teams.

Game three was the first postseason match at Joe Louis Arena, and the first in Detroit since 1978.

April 4	Detroit Red Wings	2–3	St. Louis Blues	St. Louis Arena	Recap
No scoring		First period	No scoring
No scoring		Second period	14:32 – Jorgen Pettersson (1)
Kelly Kisio (1) – 12:10; Ron Duguay (1) – pp – 18:47		Third period	06:34 – Mark Reeds (1); 09:00 – pp – Rob Ramage (1)
Greg Stefan 18 saves / 21 shots		Goalie stats	Mike Liut 24 saves / 26 shots

April 5	Detroit Red Wings	5–3	St. Louis Blues	St. Louis Arena	Recap
No scoring		First period	03:13 – Gilbert Delorme (1); 04:01 – Jorgen Pettersson (2)
Danny Gare (1) – 01:53; Greg Smith (1) – 15:51		Second period	No scoring
Randy Ladouceur (1) – sh – 04:57; Steve Yzerman (1) – 08:43; Danny Gare (2) – en – 19:26		Third period	07:51 – pp – Doug Gilmour (1)
Greg Stefan 28 saves / 31 shots		Goalie stats	Mike Liut 23 saves / 27 shots

April 7	St. Louis Blues	4–3	2OT	Detroit Red Wings	Joe Louis Arena	Recap
Perry Ganchar (1) – pp – 08:29; Doug Wickenheiser (1) – sh – 18:06		First period		04:32 – pp – Steve Yzerman (2); 09:43 – pp – Reed Larson (1)
Bernie Federko (1) – pp – 00:13		Second period		09:23 – Steve Yzerman (3)
No scoring		Third period		No scoring
Mark Reeds (2) – 17:07		Second overtime period		No scoring
Mike Liut 36 saves / 39 shots		Goalie stats		Greg Stefan 32 saves / 34 shots Corrado Micalef 3 saves / 5 shots

April 8	St. Louis Blues	3–2	OT	Detroit Red Wings	Joe Louis Arena	Recap
Jorgen Pettersson (3) – pp – 09:39		First period		No scoring
Jorgen Pettersson (4) – 05:56		Second period		03:48 – pp – Reed Larson (2); 19:49 – Ron Duguay (2)
No scoring		Third period		No scoring
Jorgen Pettersson (5) – 02:42		First overtime period		No scoring
Mike Liut 40 saves / 42 shots		Goalie stats		Eddie Mio 21 saves / 24 shots

St. Louis won series 3–1

==== (S1) Edmonton Oilers vs. (S4) Winnipeg Jets ====
This was the second playoff series meeting between these two teams. This was a rematch of last year's Smythe Division Semifinals, in which Edmonton won in a three-game sweep.

April 4	Winnipeg Jets	2–9	Edmonton Oilers	Northlands Coliseum	Recap
Paul MacLean (1) – 17:34		First period	00:40 – Jari Kurri (1); 07:18 – Randy Gregg (1); 14:35 – Paul Coffey (1); 16:20 – Dave Hunter (1); 18:21 – Paul Coffey (2)
No scoring		Second period	07:24 – Ken Linseman (1)
Dave Babych (1) – pp – 11:57		Third period	05:00 – Jari Kurri (2); 09:28 – Jari Kurri (3); 18:41 – Ken Linseman (2)
Mike Veisor 25 saves / 29 shots Doug Soetaert 14 saves / 19 shots		Goalie stats	Grant Fuhr 37 saves / 39 shots

April 5	Winnipeg Jets	4–5	OT	Edmonton Oilers	Northlands Coliseum	Recap
Dale Hawerchuk (1) – pp – 02:32; Tim Watters (1) – 13:18		First period		12:44 – Wayne Gretzky (1)
Moe Mantha (1) – sh – 04:53		Second period		03:14 – Dave Semenko (1)
Andrew McBain (1) – 05:55		Third period		11:12 – Glenn Anderson (1); 12:58 – Raimo Summanen (1)
No scoring		First overtime period		00:21 – Randy Gregg (2)
Marc Behrend 49 saves / 54 shots		Goalie stats		Grant Fuhr 34 saves / 38 shots

April 7	Edmonton Oilers	4–1	Winnipeg Jets	Winnipeg Arena	Recap
Jari Kurri (4) – 15:55		First period	No scoring
Dave Semenko (2) – 18:56		Second period	11:29 – Andrew McBain (2)
Mark Messier (1) – 01:57; Charlie Huddy (1) – 10:45		Third period	No scoring
Grant Fuhr 36 saves / 37 shots		Goalie stats	Marc Behrend 29 saves / 33 shots

Edmonton won series 3–0

==== (S2) Calgary Flames vs. (S3) Vancouver Canucks ====
This was the third playoff series meeting between these two teams. Both teams split their prior two meetings in the past two seasons. Calgary won last year's Smythe Division Semifinals 3–1.

April 4	Vancouver Canucks	3–5	Calgary Flames	Olympic Saddledome	Recap
Jere Gillis (1) – 10:31		First period	No scoring
No scoring		Second period	03:59 – Colin Patterson (1); 08:24 – Mike Eaves (1); 15:14 – Steve Bozek (1)
Stan Smyl (1) – 03:04; Tony Tanti (1) – 04:59		Third period	09:18 – pp – Hakan Loob (1); 19:23 – en – Doug Risebrough (1)
Richard Brodeur 24 saves / 28 shots John Garrett 0 saves / 0 shots		Goalie stats	Rejean Lemelin 32 saves / 35 shots

April 5	Vancouver Canucks	2–4	Calgary Flames	Olympic Saddledome	Recap
No scoring		First period	No scoring
Tiger Williams (1) – 09:32		Second period	10:06 – Jim Peplinski (1); 11:09 – Mike Eaves (2)
Jere Gillis (2) – 11:02		Third period	06:40 – pp – Al MacInnis (1); 19:52 – en – Doug Risebrough (2)
Richard Brodeur 42 saves / 45 shots		Goalie stats	Rejean Lemelin 32 saves / 34 shots

April 7	Calgary Flames	0–7	Vancouver Canucks	Pacific Coliseum	Recap
No scoring		First period	16:20 – Neil Belland (1); 17:19 – Doug Halward (1); 19:33 – pp – Doug Halward (2)
No scoring		Second period	07:49 – Ron Delorme (1); 09:13 – pp – Cam Neely (1)
No scoring		Third period	10:46 – pp – Doug Halward (3); 13:02 – Cam Neely (2)
Rejean Lemelin 14 saves / 19 shots Don Edwards 13 saves / 15 shots		Goalie stats	Richard Brodeur 15 saves / 15 shots

April 8	Calgary Flames	5–1	Vancouver Canucks	Pacific Coliseum	Recap
Paul Reinhart (1) – 09:07; Hakan Loob (2) – 10:37; Jim Jackson (1) – sh – 19:14		First period	No scoring
Paul Reinhart (2) – 12:41		Second period	No scoring
Paul Reinhart (3) – 02:37		Third period	12:18 – Stan Smyl (2)
Don Edwards 28 saves / 29 shots		Goalie stats	Richard Brodeur 21 saves / 26 shots John Garrett 4 saves / 4 shots

Calgary won series 3–1

== Division finals ==
=== Prince of Wales Conference ===
==== (A3) Quebec Nordiques vs. (A4) Montreal Canadiens ====
This was the second playoff series meeting between these two teams. Quebec won the only previous meeting 3–2 in the 1982 Adams Division Semifinals.

Game six of this series is referred to as the Good Friday Massacre.

April 12	Montreal Canadiens	2–4	Quebec Nordiques	Quebec Coliseum	Recap
Chris Nilan (1) – 01:53; Mark Hunter (1) – 09:00		First period	02:22 – Marian Stastny (2); 14:06 – pp – Jean-Francois Sauve (2)
No scoring		Second period	17:54 – Blake Wesley (1)
No scoring		Third period	07:19 – Louis Sleigher (1)
Steve Penney 28 saves / 32 shots		Goalie stats	Dan Bouchard 16 saves / 18 shots

April 13	Montreal Canadiens	4–1	Quebec Nordiques	Quebec Coliseum	Recap
No scoring		First period	No scoring
Pierre Mondou (2) – 09:41		Second period	No scoring
Mats Naslund (2) – pp – 06:00; Steve Shutt (1) – 08:52; Perry Turnbull (1) – 17:30		Third period	00:36 – Anton Stastny (2)
Steve Penney 22 saves / 23 shots		Goalie stats	Dan Bouchard 20 saves / 24 shots

April 15	Quebec Nordiques	1–2	Montreal Canadiens	Montreal Forum	Recap
Pat Price (1) – 08:53		First period	00:59 – pp – Bobby Smith (2)
No scoring		Second period	06:15 – pp – Ryan Walter (1)
No scoring		Third period	No scoring
Dan Bouchard 27 saves / 29 shots		Goalie stats	Steve Penney 16 saves / 17 shots

April 16	Quebec Nordiques	4–3	OT	Montreal Canadiens	Montreal Forum	Recap
No scoring		First period		14:45 – Ryan Walter (2); 19:50 – Guy Carbonneau (2)
Wilf Paiement (2) – 13:36; Andre Savard (3) – 18:51		Second period		17:31 – Mario Tremblay (4)
Randy Moller (1) – 11:23		Third period		No scoring
Bo Berglund (2) – 03:00		First overtime period		No scoring
Dan Bouchard 17 saves / 20 shots		Goalie stats		Steve Penney 30 saves / 34 shots

April 18	Montreal Canadiens	4–0	Quebec Nordiques	Quebec Coliseum	Recap
No scoring		First period	No scoring
Pierre Mondou (3) – 07:56		Second period	No scoring
Mario Tremblay (5) – 04:16; Steve Shutt (2) – 05:36; Mats Naslund (3) – sh – 07:04		Third period	No scoring
Steve Penney 26 saves / 26 shots		Goalie stats	Dan Bouchard 20 saves / 24 shots

April 20	Quebec Nordiques	3–5	Montreal Canadiens	Montreal Forum	Recap
Peter Stastny (2) – pp – 05:12		First period	No scoring
No scoring		Second period	No scoring
Michel Goulet (2) – 02:02; Wilf Paiement (3) – 16:51		Third period	06:23 – Steve Shutt (3); 09:11 – Steve Shutt (4); 12:14 – Rick Green (1); 13:27 – John Chabot (1); 14:25 – Guy Carbonneau (3)
Dan Bouchard 21 saves / 26 shots		Goalie stats	Steve Penney 21 saves / 24 shots

Montreal won series 4–2

==== (P1) New York Islanders vs. (P2) Washington Capitals ====
This was the second playoff series meeting between these two teams. This was a rematch of last year's Patrick Division Semifinals, in which New York won 3–1. By winning their eighteenth consecutive series, the Islanders set a North American major professional sports record for most consecutive playoff series victories (previously set by the Boston Celtics with seventeen series wins over eight years in the 1950s and 1960s).

April 12	Washington Capitals	3–2	New York Islanders	Nassau Coliseum	Recap
No scoring		First period	04:34 – Patrick Flatley (2)
Alan Haworth (2) – pp – 09:21		Second period	07:46 – pp – Mike Bossy (2)
Dave Christian (3) – pp – 06:13; Craig Laughlin (4) – 18:52		Third period	No scoring
Al Jensen 16 saves / 18 shots		Goalie stats	Billy Smith 24 saves / 27 shots Roland Melanson 0 saves / 0 shots

April 13	Washington Capitals	4–5	OT	New York Islanders	Nassau Coliseum	Recap
Bengt-Ake Gustafsson (1) – pp – 11:02; Bengt-Ake Gustafsson (2) – pp – 11:52		First period		04:43 – pp – Butch Goring (1); 05:51 – Bryan Trottier (2); 09:49 – Patrick Flatley (3); 13:39 – Mike Bossy (3)
Scott Stevens (1) – pp – 06:21		Second period		No scoring
Mike Gartner (3) – pp – 11:50		Third period		No scoring
No scoring		First overtime period		07:35 – Anders Kallur (1)
Al Jensen 6 saves / 10 shots Pat Riggin 11 saves / 12 shots		Goalie stats		Billy Smith 31 saves / 35 shots

April 15	New York Islanders	3–1	Washington Capitals	Capital Centre	Recap
No scoring		First period	No scoring
Patrick Flatley (4) – 17:12		Second period	05:05 – Alan Haworth (3)
Brent Sutter (2) – 14:28; Bryan Trottier (3) – en – 19:36		Third period	No scoring
Billy Smith 32 saves / 33 shots		Goalie stats	Pat Riggin 16 saves / 18 shots

April 16	New York Islanders	5–2	Washington Capitals	Capital Centre	Recap
Bryan Trottier (4) – 19:22		First period	No scoring
Clark Gillies (3) – 05:33; Paul Boutilier (1) – 11:35		Second period	No scoring
Clark Gillies (4) – 16:18; Mike Bossy (4) – en – 19:01		Third period	05:05 – Bobby Carpenter (1); 05:39 – Dave Christian (4)
Billy Smith 22 saves / 24 shots		Goalie stats	Pat Riggin 15 saves / 18 shots Al Jensen 3 saves / 4 shots

April 18	Washington Capitals	3–5	New York Islanders	Nassau Coliseum	Recap
Doug Jarvis (2) – 11:21; Dave Christian (5) – 16:03		First period	No scoring
Bobby Carpenter (2) – pp – 19:37		Second period	01:18 – Bryan Trottier (5); 09:16 – Patrick Flatley (5); 10:21 – sh – Anders Kallur (2); 16:57 – pp – Patrick Flatley (6)
No scoring		Third period	18:17 – pp – Greg Gilbert (2)
Al Jensen 13 saves / 17 shots Pat Riggin 10 saves / 11 shots		Goalie stats	Billy Smith 23 saves / 26 shots

New York won series 4–1

=== Clarence Campbell Conference ===
==== (N1) Minnesota North Stars vs. (N2) St. Louis Blues ====
This was the fifth playoff series meeting between these two teams. St. Louis won three of the previous four meetings, including their most recent in the 1972 Stanley Cup Quarterfinals in seven games.

Steve Payne scored the game-winner at 6:00 in overtime of game seven to send the North Stars to the conference finals.

April 12	St. Louis Blues	1–2	Minnesota North Stars	Met Center	Recap
No scoring		First period	No scoring
No scoring		Second period	12:12 – pp – Mark Napier (1)
Pat Hickey (1) – sh – 06:07		Third period	08:23 – Dino Ciccarelli (3)
Mike Liut 39 saves / 41 shots		Goalie stats	Don Beaupre 23 saves / 24 shots

April 13	St. Louis Blues	4–3	OT	Minnesota North Stars	Met Center	Recap
No scoring		First period		No scoring
Perry Ganchar (2) – 12:33		Second period		06:58 – Dennis Maruk (3); 17:18 – Craig Levie (1); 17:47 – Willi Plett (2)
Jorgen Pettersson (6) – pp – 04:21; Joe Mullen (1) – 07:30		Third period		No scoring
Doug Gilmour (2) – 16:16		First overtime period		No scoring
Mike Liut 35 saves / 38 shots		Goalie stats		Don Beaupre 32 saves / 36 shots

April 15	Minnesota North Stars	1–3	St. Louis Blues	St. Louis Arena	Recap
No scoring		First period	No scoring
No scoring		Second period	16:27 – Dave Pichette (1)
Dennis Maruk (4) – pp – 17:35		Third period	13:22 – Doug Wickenheiser (2); 14:05 – Bernie Federko (2)
Don Beaupre 32 saves / 35 shots		Goalie stats	Mike Liut 24 saves / 25 shots

April 16	Minnesota North Stars	3–2	St. Louis Blues	St. Louis Arena	Recap
Keith Acton (3) – 00:39; Brian Bellows (1) – sh – 16:54		First period	06:08 – Greg Paslawski (1)
Tom McCarthy (1) – pp – 08:01		Second period	13:58 – Bernie Federko (3)
No scoring		Third period	No scoring
Don Beaupre 31 saves / 33 shots		Goalie stats	Mike Liut 23 saves / 26 shots

April 18	St. Louis Blues	0–6	Minnesota North Stars	Met Center	Recap
No scoring		First period	10:50 – Steve Payne (1); 18:40 – Craig Levie (2)
No scoring		Second period	15:27 – pp – Keith Acton (4)
No scoring		Third period	12:00 – Dennis Maruk (5); 12:26 – Willi Plett (3); 14:03 – Neal Broten (2)
Mike Liut 17 saves / 22 shots Rick Heinz 1 save / 2 shots		Goalie stats	Don Beaupre 29 saves / 29 shots

April 20	Minnesota North Stars	0–4	St. Louis Blues	St. Louis Arena	Recap
No scoring		First period	11:21 – Bernie Federko (4)
No scoring		Second period	04:42 – Joe Mullen (2)
No scoring		Third period	09:28 – Wayne Babych (1); 11:18 – pp – Perry Ganchar (3)
Don Beaupre 29 saves / 33 shots		Goalie stats	Mike Liut 32 saves / 32 shots

April 22	St. Louis Blues	3–4	OT	Minnesota North Stars	Met Center	Recap
Brian Sutter (1) – pp – 15:05		First period		11:28 – Willi Plett (4)
No scoring		Second period		No scoring
Jorgen Pettersson (7) – 08:52; Mark Reeds (3) – sh – 14:06		Third period		01:34 – sh – Gordie Roberts (3); 14:21 – Willi Plett (5)
No scoring		First overtime period		06:00 – Steve Payne (2)
Mike Liut 39 saves / 43 shots		Goalie stats		Don Beaupre 25 saves / 28 shots

Minnesota won series 4–3

==== (S1) Edmonton Oilers vs. (S2) Calgary Flames ====
This was the second playoff series meeting between these two teams. This was a rematch of last year's Smythe Division Finals, in which Edmonton won in five games.

Lanny McDonald scored the overtime winner for Calgary in game six.

April 12	Calgary Flames	2–5	Edmonton Oilers	Northlands Coliseum	Recap
Mike Eaves (3) – sh – 07:56		First period	19:28 – pp – Jari Kurri (5)
Lanny McDonald (1) – pp – 15:08		Second period	08:47 – Ken Linseman (3); 11:04 – Wayne Gretzky (2)
No scoring		Third period	06:29 – Kevin Lowe (1); 19:14 – en – Wayne Gretzky (3)
Rejean Lemelin 49 saves / 53 shots Don Edwards 0 saves / 0 shots		Goalie stats	Grant Fuhr 27 saves / 29 shots

April 13	Calgary Flames	6–5	OT	Edmonton Oilers	Northlands Coliseum	Recap
Dan Quinn (1) – pp – 01:50		First period		16:46 – Kevin McClelland (1)
Eddy Beers (1) – 18:38		Second period		03:51 – pp – Paul Coffey (3); 04:59 – Kevin Lowe (2); 11:08 – Dave Hunter (2)
Richard Kromm (1) – 03:04; Carey Wilson (1) – 13:07; Steve Bozek (2) – pp – 18:27		Third period		19:15 – Wayne Gretzky (4)
Carey Wilson (2) – 03:42		First overtime period		No scoring
Don Edwards 42 saves / 47 shots		Goalie stats		Grant Fuhr 44 saves / 50 shots

April 15	Edmonton Oilers	3–2	Calgary Flames	Olympic Saddledome	Recap
No scoring		First period	No scoring
Paul Coffey (4) – 02:21; Paul Coffey (5) – 09:39		Second period	01:45 – Paul Reinhart (4)
Jaroslav Pouzar (1) – 03:13		Third period	05:43 – Lanny McDonald (2)
Grant Fuhr 35 saves / 37 shots		Goalie stats	Rejean Lemelin 27 saves / 30 shots Don Edwards 0 saves / 0 shots

April 16	Edmonton Oilers	5–3	Calgary Flames	Olympic Saddledome	Recap
Dave Hunter (3) – sh – 11:02		First period	No scoring
Willy Lindstrom (1) – pp – 06:25; Jari Kurri (6) – 15:44		Second period	13:22 – Eddy Beers (2); 15:00 – Paul Reinhart (5)
Mark Messier (2) – 00:09; Dave Hunter (4) – pp-en – 19:30		Third period	02:43 – Lanny McDonald (3)
Grant Fuhr 29 saves / 32 shots		Goalie stats	Don Edwards 37 saves / 41 shots

April 18	Calgary Flames	5–4	Edmonton Oilers	Northlands Coliseum	Recap
Jamie Macoun (1) – pp – 04:23; Dan Quinn (2) – 15:33; Jim Peplinski (2)		First period	13:52 – pp – Willy Lindstrom (2)
Lanny McDonald (4) – pp – 00:46; Mike Eaves (4) – pp – 09:22		Second period	03:45 – Glenn Anderson (2); 19:24 – Mark Messier (3)
No scoring		Third period	10:20 – Willy Lindstrom (3)
Rejean Lemelin 33 saves / 37 shots		Goalie stats	Grant Fuhr 14 saves / 19 shots Andy Moog 13 saves / 13 shots

April 20	Edmonton Oilers	4–5	OT	Calgary Flames	Olympic Saddledome	Recap
Ken Linseman (4) – sh – 07:11; Glenn Anderson (3) – pp – 12:24		First period		03:07 – pp – Lanny McDonald (5); 11:05 – Jim Peplinski (3)
Dave Semenko (3) – 04:56		Second period		01:21 – Dan Quinn (3); 12:51 – sh – Paul Reinhart (6)
Mark Messier (4) – pp – 06:53		Third period		No scoring
No scoring		First overtime period		01:04 – Lanny McDonald (6)
Grant Fuhr 34 saves / 39 shots		Goalie stats		Rejean Lemelin 34 saves / 38 shots

April 22	Calgary Flames	4–7	Edmonton Oilers	Northlands Coliseum	Recap
Carey Wilson (3) – 10:03; Steve Bozek (3) – 16:56		First period	09:03 – Lee Fogolin Jr. (1); 09:23 – Wayne Gretzky (5)
Steve Konroyd (1) – 06:43; Al MacInnis (2) – pp – 10:15		Second period	01:15 – pp – Jari Kurri (7); 13:50 – Glenn Anderson (4); 14:48 – Ken Linseman (5); 18:00 – Jari Kurri (8)
No scoring		Third period	00:33 – Pat Hughes (1)
Rejean Lemelin 36 saves / 43 shots		Goalie stats	Andy Moog 5 saves / 8 shots Grant Fuhr 14 saves / 15 shots

Edmonton won series 4–3

== Conference finals ==
=== Prince of Wales Conference final ===
==== (P1) New York Islanders vs. (A4) Montreal Canadiens ====
This was the third playoff series meeting between these two teams. Montreal won both prior meetings, including the most recent meeting in six games in the 1977 Stanley Cup Semifinals.

April 24	New York Islanders	0–3	Montreal Canadiens	Montreal Forum	Recap
No scoring		First period	17:41 – Guy Carbonneau (4)
No scoring		Second period	No scoring
No scoring		Third period	01:46 – Mats Naslund (4); 07:45 – pp – Steve Shutt (5)
Billy Smith 20 saves / 23 shots		Goalie stats	Steve Penney 24 saves / 24 shots

April 26	New York Islanders	2–4	Montreal Canadiens	Montreal Forum	Recap
Clark Gillies (5) – 11:58		First period	07:46 – Pierre Mondou (4)
Denis Potvin (1) – pp – 17:07		Second period	06:18 – Steve Shutt (6); 11:24 – Mats Naslund (5)
No scoring		Third period	00:47 – pp – Mats Näslund (6)
Billy Smith 17 saves / 21 shots Roland Melanson 0 saves / 0 shots		Goalie stats	Steve Penney 15 saves / 17 shots

April 28	Montreal Canadiens	2–5	New York Islanders	Nassau Coliseum	Recap
No scoring		First period	07:35 – pp – Tomas Jonsson (2); 07:48 – Greg Gilbert (3)
Pierre Mondou (5) – pp – 17:23		Second period	01:26 – Mike Bossy (5); 06:01 – Clark Gillies (6); 08:24 – Greg Gilbert (4)
Mark Hunter (2) – 03:32		Third period	No scoring
Steve Penney 9 saves / 14 shots Rick Wamsley 12 saves / 12 shots		Goalie stats	Billy Smith 20 saves / 22 shots

May 1	Montreal Canadiens	1–3	New York Islanders	Nassau Coliseum	Recap
Steve Shutt (7) – pp – 12:31		First period	04:18 – pp – Tomas Jonsson (3)
No scoring		Second period	16:40 – Mike Bossy (6)
No scoring		Third period	02:24 – Gord Dineen (1)
Steve Penney 22 saves / 25 shots		Goalie stats	Billy Smith 26 saves / 27 shots

May 3	New York Islanders	3–1	Montreal Canadiens	Montreal Forum	Recap
Bryan Trottier (6) – pp – 03:55; Brent Sutter (3) – sh – 09:36		First period	No scoring
No scoring		Second period	No scoring
Patrick Flatley (7) – 15:21		Third period	12:39 – Pierre Mondou (6)
Billy Smith 24 saves / 25 shots		Goalie stats	Steve Penney 18 saves / 21 shots

May 5	Montreal Canadiens	1–4	New York Islanders	Nassau Coliseum	Recap
No scoring		First period	04:51 – Clark Gillies (7); 07:22 – Mike Bossy (7)
No scoring		Second period	No scoring
Mario Tremblay (6) – 02:47		Third period	00:30 – Patrick Flatley (8); 15:36 – pp – Mike Bossy (8)
Steve Penney 18 saves / 22 shots		Goalie stats	Billy Smith 22 saves / 23 shots

New York won series 4–2

=== Clarence Campbell Conference final ===
==== (S1) Edmonton Oilers vs. (N1) Minnesota North Stars ====
This was the first playoff series meeting between these two teams.

April 24	Minnesota North Stars	1–7	Edmonton Oilers	Northlands Coliseum	Recap
No scoring		First period	01:32 – Dave Semenko (4); 16:41 – Wayne Gretzky (6)
Steve Payne (3) – pp – 19:36		Second period	17:22 – Pat Hughes (2); 18:01 – Jari Kurri (9)
No scoring		Third period	00:13 – Kevin McClelland (2); 10:26 – Dave Hunter (5); 12:39 – Jari Kurri (10)
Don Beaupre 15 saves / 20 shots Gilles Meloche 4 saves / 6 shots		Goalie stats	Grant Fuhr 33 saves / 34 shots

April 26	Minnesota North Stars	3–4	Edmonton Oilers	Northlands Coliseum	Recap
No scoring		First period	13:53 – Ken Linseman (6); 16:12 – pp – Ken Linseman (7)
Neal Broten (3) – pp – 00:11; Willi Plett (6) – 02:37; Brian Bellows (2) – 10:30		Second period	08:03 – Jari Kurri (11)
No scoring		Third period	06:01 – pp – Wayne Gretzky (7)
Don Beaupre 31 saves / 35 shots		Goalie stats	Grant Fuhr 14 saves / 17 shots Andy Moog 7 saves / 7 shots

April 28	Edmonton Oilers	8–5	Minnesota North Stars	Met Center	Recap
Dave Lumley (1) – 10:30; Wayne Gretzky (8) – pp – 12:28		First period	No scoring
Paul Coffey (6) – pp – 14:00		Second period	04:09 – pp – Brad Maxwell (2); 08:48 – pp – Mark Napier (2); 10:22 – pp – Mark Napier (3); 12:04 – pp – Neal Broten (4); 12:36 – Neal Broten (5)
Jari Kurri (12) – pp – 04:58; Glenn Anderson (5) – 06:06; Ken Linseman (8) – 07:05; Mark Messier (5) – sh – 10:10; Wayne Gretzky (9) – sh – 10:42		Third period	No scoring
Andy Moog 30 saves / 35 shots		Goalie stats	Don Beaupre 27 saves / 35 shots

May 1	Edmonton Oilers	3–1	Minnesota North Stars	Met Center	Recap
No scoring		First period	No scoring
Don Jackson (1) – 04:58		Second period	No scoring
Ken Linseman (9) – pp – 07:38; Jari Kurri (13) – en – 19:11		Third period	10:35 – Dino Ciccarelli (4)
Grant Fuhr 24 saves / 25 shots		Goalie stats	Gilles Meloche 30 saves / 32 shots

Edmonton won series 4–0

== Stanley Cup Final ==
This was the third playoff series meeting between these two teams. New York won both previous meetings, and was a rematch of New York's four-game sweep in last year's Stanley Cup Final.

The Islanders attempted to match the 1950s Montreal Canadiens and win the Stanley Cup five consecutive times, against the Edmonton Oilers who were attempting to win the franchise's first championship. The Islanders lost the first game at home 1–0, but bounced back to defeat the Oilers 6–1 in the second game. Edmonton took over the series from that point, winning the next three games, all played in Edmonton.

May 10	Edmonton Oilers	1–0	New York Islanders	Nassau Coliseum	Recap
No scoring		First period	No scoring
No scoring		Second period	No scoring
Kevin McClelland (3) – 01:55		Third period	No scoring
Grant Fuhr 34 saves / 34 shots		Goalie stats	Billy Smith 37 saves / 38 shots Roland Melanson 0 saves / 0 shots

May 12	Edmonton Oilers	1–6	New York Islanders	Nassau Coliseum	Recap
Randy Gregg (3) – 15:06		First period	00:53 – Bryan Trottier (7); 05:48 – pp – Greg Gilbert (5); 18:31 – Clark Gillies (8)
No scoring		Second period	04:52 – Bryan Trottier (8); 16:48 – pp – Clark Gillies (9)
No scoring		Third period	17:04 – pp – Clark Gillies (10)
Grant Fuhr 20 saves / 26 shots		Goalie stats	Billy Smith 22 saves / 23 shots

May 15	New York Islanders	2–7	Edmonton Oilers	Northlands Coliseum	Recap
Clark Gillies (11) – 01:32		First period	13:49 – Kevin Lowe (3)
Clark Gillies (12) – pp – 02:54		Second period	08:38 – Mark Messier (6); 19:12 – Glenn Anderson (6); 19:29 – Paul Coffey (7)
No scoring		Third period	05:32 – Mark Messier (7); 05:52 – Kevin McClelland (4); 09:41 – Dave Semenko (5)
Billy Smith 25 saves / 31 shots Roland Melanson 8 saves / 9 shots		Goalie stats	Grant Fuhr 22 saves / 24 shots Andy Moog 1 save / 1 shot

May 17	New York Islanders	2–7	Edmonton Oilers	Northlands Coliseum	Recap
Brent Sutter (4) – 14:03		First period	01:53 – Wayne Gretzky (10); 03:22 – Willy Lindstrom (4); 17:54 – Mark Messier (8)
Patrick Flatley (9) – 19:44		Second period	05:21 – pp – Willy Lindstrom (5); 06:58 – Pat Conacher (1); 10:52 – Paul Coffey (8)
No scoring		Third period	14:01 – Wayne Gretzky (11)
Billy Smith 31 saves / 38 shots		Goalie stats	Andy Moog 19 saves / 21 shots

May 19	New York Islanders	2–5	Edmonton Oilers	Northlands Coliseum	Recap
No scoring		First period	12:08 – Wayne Gretzky (12); 17:26 – Wayne Gretzky (13)
No scoring		Second period	00:38 – pp – Ken Linseman (10); 04:59 – pp – Jari Kurri (14)
Pat LaFontaine (2) – 00:13; Pat LaFontaine (3) – 00:35		Third period	19:47 – en – Dave Lumley (2)
Billy Smith 7 saves / 9 shots Roland Melanson 12 saves / 14 shots		Goalie stats	Andy Moog 23 saves / 25 shots

Edmonton won series 4–1

== Player statistics ==
=== Skaters ===
These are the top ten skaters based on points.

Player	Team	GP	G	A	Pts	+/–	PIM
Wayne Gretzky	Edmonton Oilers	19	13	22	35	+18	12
Jari Kurri	Edmonton Oilers	19	14	14	28	+9	13
Mark Messier	Edmonton Oilers	19	8	18	26	+9	19
Paul Coffey	Edmonton Oilers	19	8	14	22	+18	21
Clark Gillies	New York Islanders	21	12	7	19	+2	19
Mike Bossy	New York Islanders	21	8	10	18	+5	4
Glenn Anderson	Edmonton Oilers	19	6	11	17	+6	33
Paul Reinhart	Calgary Flames	11	6	11	17	+9	2
Patrick Flatley	New York Islanders	21	9	6	15	+7	14
Ken Linseman	Edmonton Oilers	19	10	4	14	+7	65

=== Goaltenders ===
This is a combined table of the top five goaltenders based on goals against average and the top five goaltenders based on save percentage, with at least 420 minutes played. The table is sorted by GAA, and the criteria for inclusion are bolded.

Player	Team	GP	W	L	SA	GA	GAA	SV%	SO	TOI
Steve Penney	Montreal Canadiens	15	9	6	355	32	**2.21**	**.910**	3	870:31
Mike Liut	St. Louis Blues	11	6	5	361	29	**2.44**	**.920**	1	712:32
Billy Smith	New York Islanders	21	12	8	567	54	**2.73**	**.905**	0	1188:11
Dan Bouchard	Quebec Nordiques	9	5	4	224	25	**2.77**	.888	0	542:27
Grant Fuhr	Edmonton Oilers	16	11	4	495	44	**2.99**	**.911**	1	883:44

== See also ==
- 1983–84 NHL season
- List of NHL seasons
- List of Stanley Cup champions

Preceded by 1983 Stanley Cup playoffs	Stanley Cup playoffs	Succeeded by 1985 Stanley Cup playoffs
