= Steve Penney (ice hockey) =

Canadian ice hockey player (born 1961)

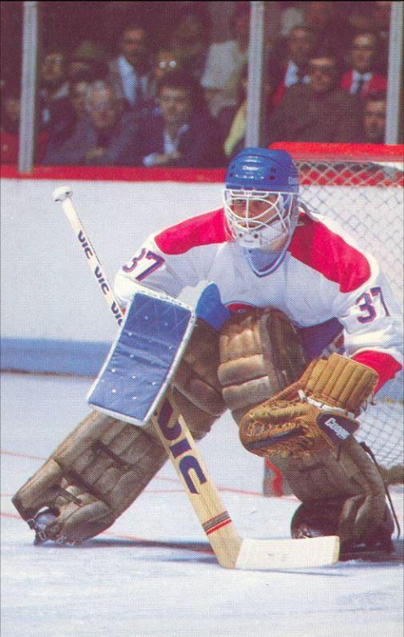
- Penney in 1983 card
- Born: February 7, 1961 (age 65) Sainte-Foy, Quebec, Canada
- Height: 6 ft 1 in (185 cm)
- Weight: 190 lb (86 kg; 13 st 8 lb)
- Position: Goaltender
- Caught: Left
- Played for: Montreal Canadiens; Winnipeg Jets
- NHL draft: 166th overall, 1980; Montreal Canadiens
- Playing career: 1981–1988

Joseph Romeo Steve Penney (born February 7, 1961) is a Canadian former professional ice hockey player. He played as a goaltender with the Montreal Canadiens and original Winnipeg Jets of the National Hockey League (NHL).

== Early life ==
Penney was born in Sainte-Foy, Quebec City. As a youth, he played in the 1974 Quebec International Pee-Wee Hockey Tournament with a minor ice hockey team from Sainte-Foy.

== Career ==
Penney made his NHL debut with a handful of games left in the 1983–84 NHL season when Montreal Canadiens coach Jacques Lemaire, dissatisfied with the play of regular goaltending tandem Rick Wamsley and Richard Sévigny, called up the 23-year-old Penney from the American Hockey League (AHL) and made him the starting goaltender for the 1984 Stanley Cup playoffs. Penney was an immediate sensation, posting three shutouts as Montreal upset both the Boston Bruins and Quebec Nordiques to reach the Wales Conference final against the four-time defending Stanley Cup champion New York Islanders. Montreal won the first two games, but the Islanders swept the next four to advance to their fifth straight Stanley Cup Final.

Penney won a Stanley Cup with the 1985–86 Montreal Canadiens. Due to a season-ending injury in January of that season, Penney only played 18 games, and his name was left off the Stanley Cup, even though he qualified due to an injury exemption. In a deep bit of irony, his replacement was another young native of Sainte-Foy who caught fire during the playoffs, as 20-year-old Patrick Roy took over in the net and led Montreal to the Stanley Cup championship. Penney was traded that off-season to the Winnipeg Jets for Brian Hayward. Montreal did include Penney on the team picture and gave him a Stanley Cup ring. He was also named to the NHL All-Rookie Team in 1984–85.

== Career statistics ==
			Regular season									Playoffs
Season	Team	League	GP	W	L	T	MIN	GA	SO	GAA	SV%	GP	W	L	MIN	GA	SO	GAA	SV%
1978–79	Shawinigan Cataractes	QMJHL	36	5	19	0	1632	181	0	6.65	.826	1	0	0	4	0	0	0.00	—
1979–80	Shawinigan Cataractes	QMJHL	31	9	13	5	1681	142	1	5.07	.850	—	—	—	—	—	—	—	—
1980–81	Shawinigan Cataractes	QMJHL	62	30	24	4	3471	244	0	4.22	.874	5	1	4	279	21	0	4.52	.886
1981–82	Nova Scotia Voyageurs	AHL	6	2	1	1	308	22	0	4.29	—	—	—	—	—	—	—	—	—
1981–82	Flint Generals	IHL	36	—	—	—	2040	147	1	4.33	—	4	0	4	222	17	0	4.59	—
1982–83	Flint Generals	IHL	48	—	—	—	2552	179	0	4.21	—	3	0	2	111	10	0	5.40	—
1983–84	Montreal Canadiens	NHL	4	0	4	0	240	19	0	4.76	.835	15	9	6	871	32	3	2.21	.910
1983–84	Nova Scotia Voyageurs	AHL	27	11	12	4	1571	92	0	3.51	.879	—	—	—	—	—	—	—	—
1984–85	Montreal Canadiens	NHL	54	26	18	8	3244	167	1	3.09	.876	12	6	6	732	40	1	3.28	.867
1985–86	Montreal Canadiens	NHL	18	6	8	2	987	72	0	4.38	.839	—	—	—	—	—	—	—	—
1986–87	Winnipeg Jets	NHL	7	1	4	1	326	25	0	4.60	.812	—	—	—	—	—	—	—	—
1986–87	Sherbrooke Canadiens	AHL	4	1	2	0	199	12	0	3.62	.872	—	—	—	—	—	—	—	—
1987–88	Winnipeg Jets	NHL	8	2	4	1	384	30	0	4.68	.839	—	—	—	—	—	—	—	—
1987–88	Moncton Hawks	AHL	28	9	14	4	1541	107	0	4.17	.868	—	—	—	—	—	—	—	—
NHL totals			91	35	38	12	5180	313	1	3.63	.859	27	15	12	1603	72	4	2.70	.890
