= Alain Côté =

Canadian ice hockey player

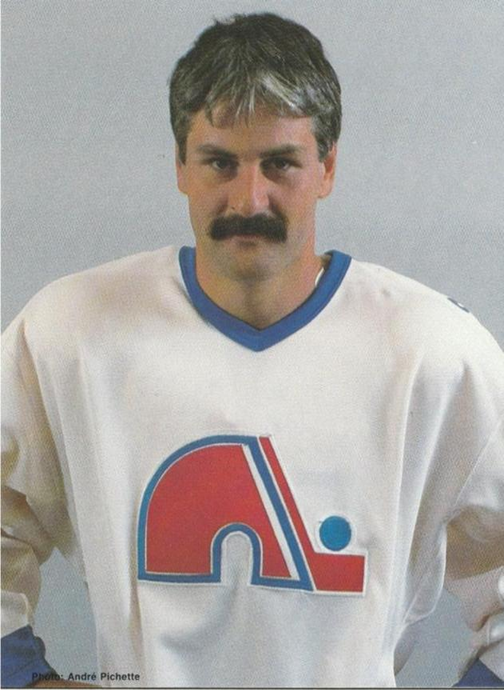
- Born: May 3, 1957 (age 69) Matane, Quebec, Canada
- Height: 5 ft 10 in (178 cm)
- Weight: 205 lb (93 kg; 14 st 9 lb)
- Position: Left wing
- Shot: Left
- Played for: Quebec Nordiques
- NHL draft: 43rd overall, 1977; Montreal Canadiens
- WHA draft: 47th overall, 1977; Quebec Nordiques
- Playing career: 1977–1989

Alain Côté (born May 3, 1957) is a Canadian former professional ice hockey player who played for the Quebec Nordiques in the National Hockey League (NHL) and the World Hockey Association (WHA).

== Playing career ==
Côté was drafted by the Montreal Canadiens in the third round (43rd overall) of the 1977 NHL amateur draft and by the Quebec Nordiques in the fifth round (47th overall) of the 1977 WHA Amateur Draft. For the expansion draft, Montreal did not leave him protected and Quebec selected him.

Côté played his entire career for the Quebec Nordiques from 1977–78 to 1988–89. In total, he played 106 games in the WHA and 696 games in the NHL.

== Personal life ==
His son Jean-Philippe Côté also played in NHL.

== Career statistics ==
=== Regular season and playoffs ===
			Regular season					Playoffs
Season	Team	League	GP	G	A	Pts	PIM	GP	G	A	Pts	PIM
1974–75	Chicoutimi Saguenéens	QMJHL	57	15	29	44	43	—	—	—	—	—
1975–76	Chicoutimi Saguenéens	QMJHL	72	35	49	84	93	—	—	—	—	—
1976–77	Chicoutimi Saguenéens	QMJHL	56	42	45	87	86	—	—	—	—	—
1977–78	Hampton Gulls	AHL	36	15	17	32	38	—	—	—	—	—
1977–78	Quebec Nordiques	WHA	27	3	5	8	8	11	1	2	3	0
1978–79	Quebec Nordiques	WHA	79	14	13	27	23	4	0	0	0	2
1979–80	Syracuse Firebirds	AHL	6	0	5	5	9	—	—	—	—	—
1979–80	Quebec Nordiques	NHL	41	5	11	16	13	—	—	—	—	—
1980–81	Rochester Americans	AHL	23	1	6	7	14	—	—	—	—	—
1980–81	Quebec Nordiques	NHL	51	8	18	26	64	4	0	0	0	6
1981–82	Quebec Nordiques	NHL	79	15	16	31	82	16	1	2	3	8
1982–83	Quebec Nordiques	NHL	79	12	28	40	45	4	0	3	3	0
1983–84	Quebec Nordiques	NHL	77	19	24	43	41	9	0	2	2	17
1984–85	Quebec Nordiques	NHL	80	13	22	35	31	18	5	5	10	11
1985–86	Quebec Nordiques	NHL	78	13	21	34	29	3	1	0	1	0
1986–87	Quebec Nordiques	NHL	80	12	24	36	38	13	2	3	5	2
1987–88	Quebec Nordiques	NHL	76	4	18	22	26	—	—	—	—	—
1988–89	Quebec Nordiques	NHL	55	2	8	10	14	—	—	—	—	—
WHA totals			106	17	18	35	31	15	1	2	3	2
NHL totals			696	103	190	293	383	67	9	15	24	44

== See also ==
- List of NHL players who spent their entire career with one franchise
