= Pelle Lindbergh =

Swedish ice hockey player (1959–1985)

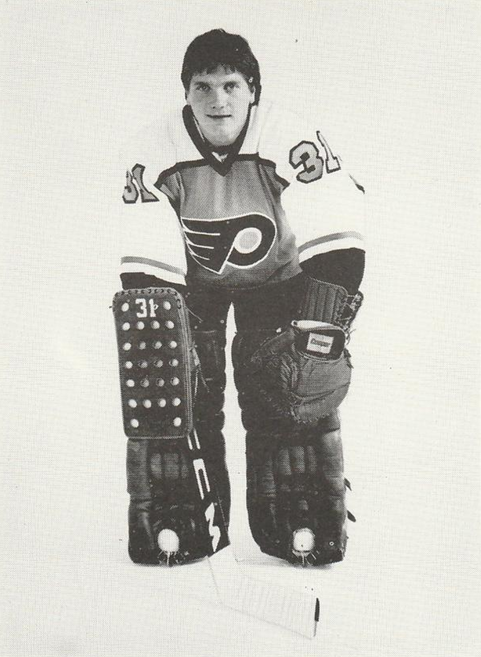
- Lindbergh with the Philadelphia Flyers in 1983
- Born: 24 May 1959 Stockholm, Sweden
- Died: 11 November 1985 (aged 26) Stratford, New Jersey, U.S.
- Height: 5 ft 9 in (175 cm)
- Weight: 158 lb (72 kg; 11 st 4 lb)
- Position: Goaltender
- Caught: Left
- Played for: AIK IF; Philadelphia Flyers
- National team: Sweden
- NHL draft: 35th overall, 1979; Philadelphia Flyers
- Playing career: 1978–1985

Göran Per-Eric "Pelle" Lindbergh (Swedish pronunciation: [ˈpɛ̌lːɛ ˈlɪ̌nːdbærj]; 24 May 1959 – 11 November 1985) was a Swedish professional ice hockey goaltender who played five seasons with the Philadelphia Flyers in the National Hockey League (NHL). He was the first European-born goaltender to be drafted in the NHL entry draft and the first to achieve success in North America.

Lindbergh died at age 26 in a single-car accident while drunk five months after leading the Flyers to the 1985 Stanley Cup Final and winning the Vezina Trophy as the NHL's top goaltender.

== Playing career ==
Having gained fame while playing for Hammarby in his youth, and while making his debut in the highest Swedish hockey league with AIK (Stockholm) leading him to the Swedish national team in the 1980 Winter Olympics, Lindbergh set his sights on the North American game. Lindbergh owns the distinction of being the goaltender on the only team that did not lose to the gold-medal-winning Team USA at the 1980 Olympics, as Team Sweden and Team USA played to a 2–2 tie in the first game of the tournament. Team Sweden would go on to win the bronze medal.

After being drafted by the Philadelphia Flyers in the 1979 NHL entry draft (second round, 35th overall) on August 9, 1979, he started his North American career during the 1980–81 season by playing one and a half seasons for the Maine Mariners of the American Hockey League (AHL) before playing his first games for the Flyers in 1982. In 1983, he was named goaltender of the NHL All-Rookie Team. He led the National Hockey League (NHL) with 40 wins, and games played with 65, he was second in both shutouts (2) and save percentage (.899), and was third in goals against average (3.02) during the 1984–85 season and won the Vezina Trophy, becoming the first European goaltender to do so in NHL history. That same year, he was also named to First All-Star team. In his final game on 7 November 1985, he made 18 saves while leading the Philadelphia Flyers to a 6–2 win over the Chicago Black Hawks.

== Death ==
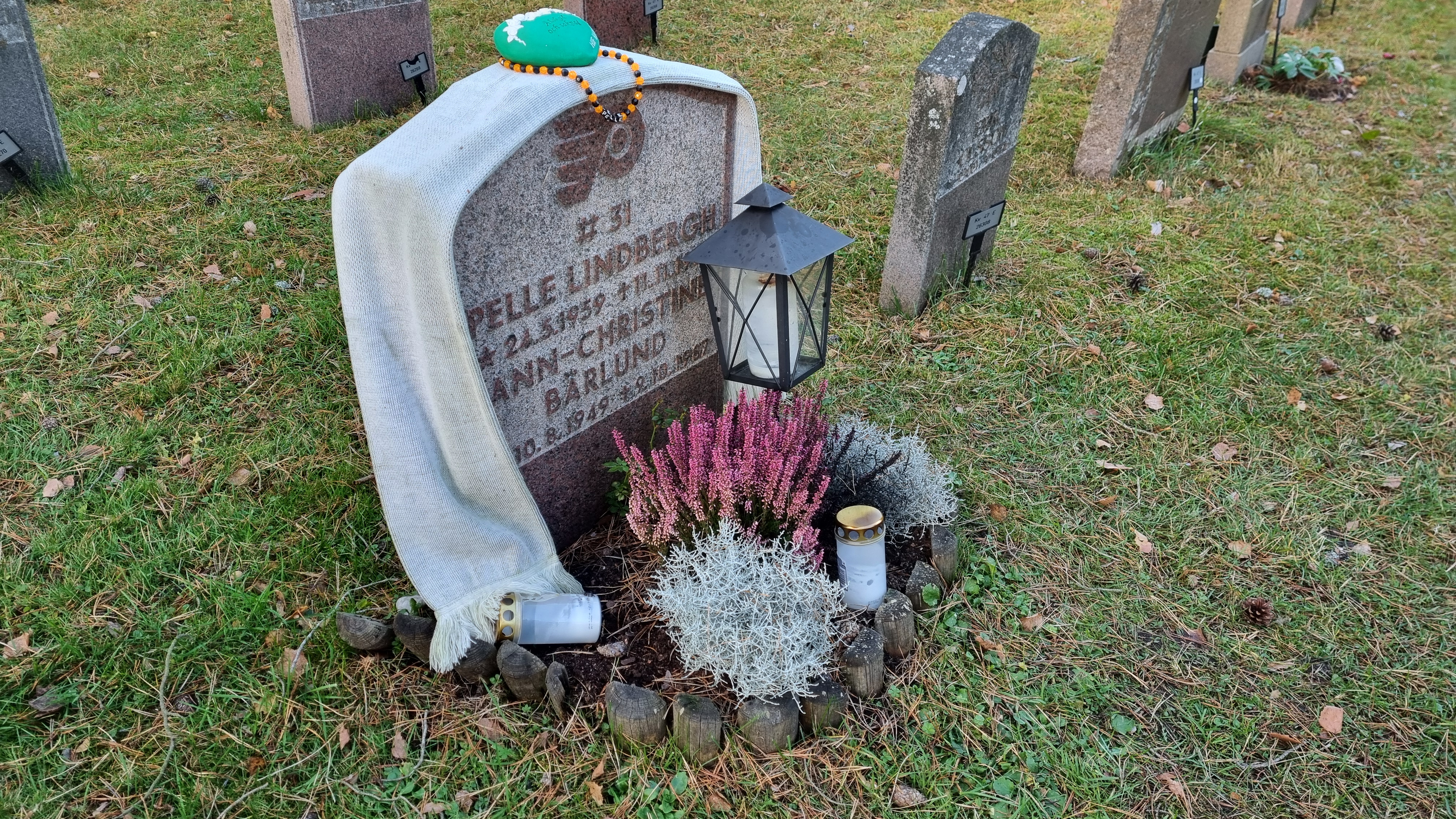
Gravestone of Pelle Lindbergh at Skogskyrkogården, Stockholm.

At 5:41 a.m. on Sunday, 10 November 1985, Lindbergh lost control of his customized Porsche 930 Turbo and struck a wall in front of a Somerdale, New Jersey, elementary school, critically injuring himself and severely injuring his two passengers. He was hospitalized in Stratford, New Jersey, and declared brain dead a few hours later. His parents gave permission to end life-saving measures, and on the following day at 9:15 a.m. on Monday, 11 November, he was declared legally dead after all brain function had ceased. His parents also agreed to organ donation, and so his heart was kept beating until 12 November, when his vital organs were harvested and prepared for transplantation.

At the time of the accident, he had just left a team party at the Coliseum, the Flyers' practice center in Voorhees Township, New Jersey. He was intoxicated at the time of the accident, with a blood alcohol level of 0.24, well above New Jersey's legal limit (0.10) at that time.

Lindbergh topped the fan voting for the 1986 NHL All-Star Game. It would mark the first time that a player was chosen posthumously for an all-star team in a major North American team sport. Sean Taylor's selection to the 2008 Pro Bowl was the only other time this has happened. Although his number 31 was never officially retired by the Flyers, no Flyer has worn the number 31 since Lindbergh's death. Lindbergh is buried in Skogskyrkogården, a cemetery in southern Stockholm.

Pelle Circle, a residential street in Far Northeast Philadelphia, was named in his honor when it was constructed in 1986.

Swedish author Thomas Tynander wrote a biography, Pelle Lindbergh: bakom den vita masken, published in 2006. An English version, Pelle Lindbergh: Behind the White Mask, was translated by Bill Meltzer and published in 2009.

== Awards and achievements ==
- Named best goaltender at the European Junior Championships in 1976, and 1977.
- Selected to the WJC All-Star team in 1978.
- Named best goaltender at the WJC in 1978.
- Selected to the Swedish World All-Star team in 1979, 1980, and 1983.
- Selected to the AHL first All-Star team in 1981.
- Harry "Hap" Holmes Memorial Award winner in 1981 (shared with Robbie Moore).
- Dudley "Red" Garrett Memorial Award winner in 1981.
- Les Cunningham Award winner in 1981.
- Selected to the NHL All-Rookie Team in 1983.
- Selected to the NHL first All-Star team in 1985.
- Vezina Trophy winner in 1985.
- Bobby Clarke Trophy winner in 1985.
- Viking Award winner in 1983.
- Played in 1983, 1985 NHL All-Star Games.
- Selected to the 1986 NHL All-Star Game posthumously.
- Swedish Hockey Hall of Fame.

The Philadelphia Flyers named a team award, the Pelle Lindbergh Memorial Trophy, in his honor. Since the 1993–94 season it has been annually awarded to the most improved player on the team.

== Career statistics ==
=== Regular season and playoffs ===
			Regular season									Playoffs
Season	Team	League	GP	W	L	T	MIN	GA	SO	GAA	SV%	GP	W	L	MIN	GA	SO	GAA	SV%
1977–78	Hammarby IF	Swe-2	36	—	—	—	—	—	—	—	—	—	—	—	—	—	—	—	—
1978–79	Hammarby IF	Swe-2	35	—	—	—	—	—	—	—	—	—	—	—	—	—	—	—	—
1978–79	AIK IF	SEL	6	—	—	—	360	38	0	6.33	—	—	—	—	—	—	—	—	—
1979–80	AIK IF	SEL	32	—	—	—	1,866	106	1	3.41	—	—	—	—	—	—	—	—	—
1980–81	Maine Mariners	AHL	51	31	14	5	3,035	165	1	3.26	.893	20	10	7	1,120	66	0	3.54	—
1981–82	Maine Mariners	AHL	25	17	7	2	1,505	83	0	3.31	.887	—	—	—	—	—	—	—	—
1981–82	Philadelphia Flyers	NHL	8	2	4	2	480	35	0	4.38	.881	—	—	—	—	—	—	—	—
1982–83	Philadelphia Flyers	NHL	40	23	13	3	2,333	116	3	2.98	.891	3	0	3	180	18	0	6.00	.788
1983–84	Philadelphia Flyers	NHL	36	16	13	3	1,999	135	1	4.05	.860	2	0	1	26	3	0	6.92	.769
1983–84	Springfield Indians	AHL	4	4	0	0	240	12	0	3.00	—	—	—	—	—	—	—	—	—
1984–85	Philadelphia Flyers	NHL	65	40	17	7	3,858	194	2	3.02	.899	18	12	6	1,008	42	3	2.50	.914
1985–86	Philadelphia Flyers	NHL	8	6	2	0	480	23	1	2.88	.884	—	—	—	—	—	—	—	—
NHL totals			157	87	49	15	9,150	503	7	3.30	.886	23	12	10	1,214	63	3	3.11	.911

=== International ===
Medal record

Men's ice hockey

Representing Sweden

Winter Olympics
Bronze medal – third place	1980 Lake Placid	

World Championships
Bronze medal – third place	1979 Soviet Union	

World Junior Championships
Silver medal – second place	1978 Canada	

Year	Team	Event	GP	W	L	T	MIN	GA	SO	GAA
1976	Sweden	EJC	3	—	—	—	180	4	0	1.33
1977	Sweden	EJC	3	—	—	—	180	3	0	1.00
1978	Sweden	WJC	4	—	—	—	240	10	0	2.50
1979	Sweden	WC	6	1	4	1	360	38	0	6.33
1980	Sweden	OG	5	2	1	2	300	18	0	3.60
1981	Sweden	CC	2	0	0	0	92	9	0	5.87
1983	Sweden	WC	9	4	4	1	540	27	0	3.00
Junior totals			10	—	—	—	600	17	0	1.70
Senior totals			22	7	9	4	1292	92	0	4.27

== See also ==
- List of ice hockey players who died during their playing career

Preceded by first recipient	Winner of the Bobby Clarke Trophy; 1985	Succeeded by Mark Howe
Preceded by Tom Barrasso	Winner of the Vezina Trophy; 1985	Succeeded by John Vanbiesbrouck
