= Pat Hughes (ice hockey) =

Canadian ice hockey player

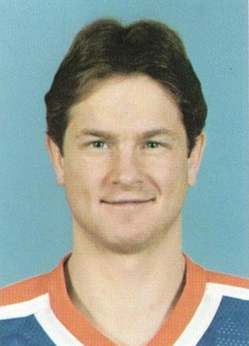
- Hughes in 1984 photo
- Born: March 25, 1955 (age 71) Calgary, Alberta, Canada
- Height: 6 ft 1 in (185 cm)
- Weight: 180 lb (82 kg; 12 st 12 lb)
- Position: Right wing
- Shot: Right
- Played for: Montreal Canadiens; Pittsburgh Penguins; Edmonton Oilers; Buffalo Sabres; St. Louis Blues; Hartford Whalers
- NHL draft: 52nd overall, 1975; Montreal Canadiens
- WHA draft: 80th overall, 1975; Calgary Cowboys
- Playing career: 1976–1987

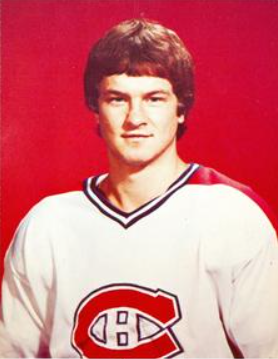
Hughes in 1978 postcard for Montreal Canadiens

Patrick James Hughes (born March 25, 1955) is a Canadian former ice hockey forward.

Hughes was born in Calgary, Alberta. After playing college hockey at the University of Michigan, he started his National Hockey League (NHL) career with the Montreal Canadiens in 1978. He later played for the Pittsburgh Penguins, Edmonton Oilers, Buffalo Sabres, St. Louis Blues and Hartford Whalers. He retired after the 1987 season. Hughes won the Stanley Cup with Montreal in 1979, and with the Oilers in 1984 and 1985. He was inducted into the Etobicoke Sports Hall of Fame in 2007.

On January 11, 1983, Hughes set a new NHL record by scoring two short-handed goals within 25 seconds of each other. On February 3, 1984, while playing with the Edmonton Oilers, Hughes became only the 34th player in the first seven decades of the NHL to score five goals in a game.

After his playing career, Hughes embarked upon a 20-year career with the Ann Arbor Police Department, but has since retired from the force.

== Career statistics ==
			Regular Season					Playoffs
Season	Team	League	GP	G	A	Pts	PIM	GP	G	A	Pts	PIM
1973–74	University of Michigan	WCHA	35	14	14	26	40	—	—	—	—	—
1974–75	University of Michigan	WCHA	38	24	19	43	64	—	—	—	—	—
1975–76	University of Michigan	WCHA	35	16	18	34	70	—	—	—	—	—
1976–77	Nova Scotia Voyageurs	AHL	77	29	39	68	144	12	2	2	4	8
1977–78	Nova Scotia Voyageurs	AHL	74	40	28	68	128	11	5	9	14	74
1977–78	Montreal Canadiens	NHL	3	0	0	0	2	—	—	—	—	—
1978–79	Montreal Canadiens	NHL	41	9	8	17	22	8	1	2	3	4
1979–80	Pittsburgh Penguins	NHL	76	18	14	32	78	5	0	0	0	21
1980–81	Pittsburgh Penguins	NHL	58	10	9	19	161	—	—	—	—	—
1980–81	Edmonton Oilers	NHL	2	0	0	0	0	5	0	0	0	4
1981–82	Edmonton Oilers	NHL	68	24	22	46	99	5	2	1	3	6
1982–83	Edmonton Oilers	NHL	80	25	20	45	85	16	2	5	7	14
1983–84	Edmonton Oilers	NHL	77	27	28	55	61	19	2	11	13	12
1984–85	Edmonton Oilers	NHL	73	12	13	25	85	10	1	1	2	4
1985–86	Rochester Americans	AHL	10	3	3	6	7	—	—	—	—	—
1985–86	Buffalo Sabres	NHL	50	4	9	13	25	—	—	—	—	—
1986–87	St. Louis Blues	NHL	43	1	5	6	26	—	—	—	—	—
1986–87	Hartford Whalers	NHL	2	0	0	0	2	3	0	0	0	0
NHL totals			573	130	128	258	646	71	8	20	28	65

== Awards and achievements ==
- Stanley Cup champion – 1979, 1984, 1985
