= Keith Acton =

Canadian ice hockey player (born 1958)

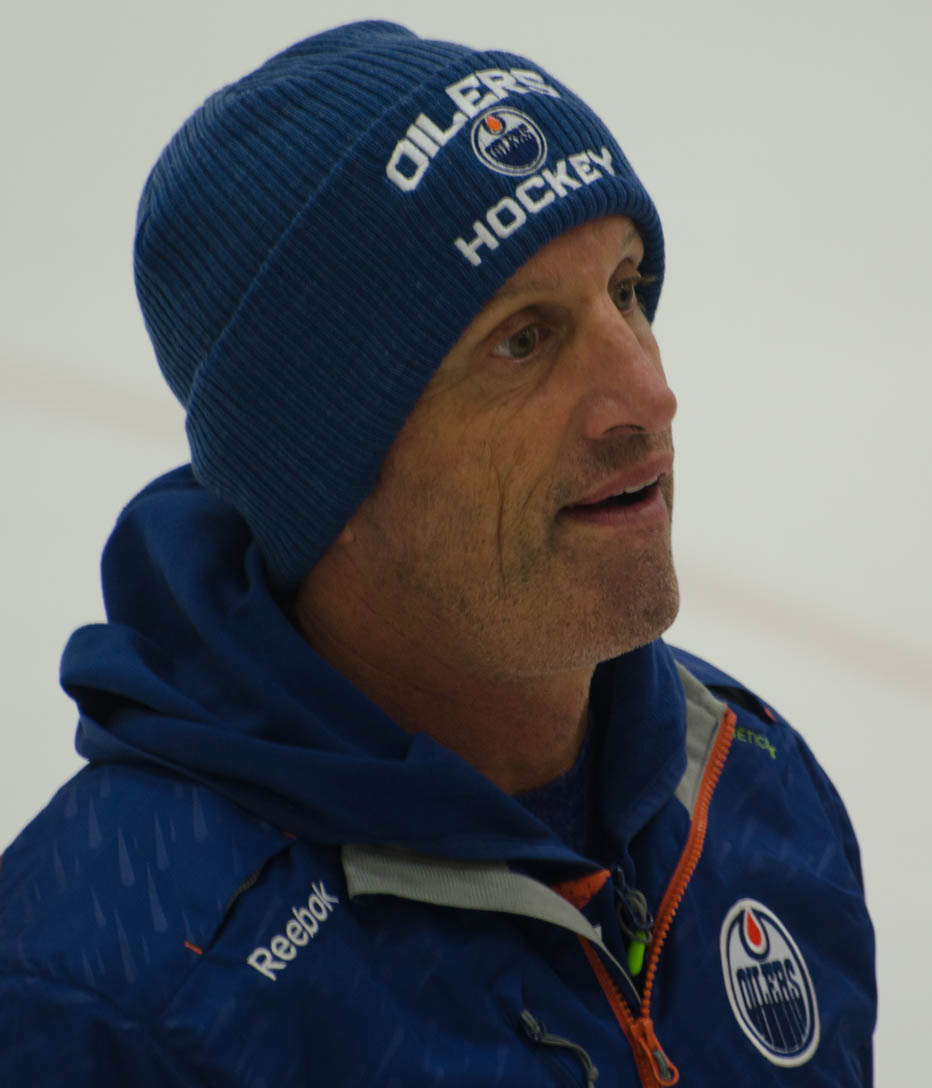
- Acton in 2014
- Born: April 15, 1958 (age 68) Stouffville, Ontario, Canada
- Height: 5 ft 8 in (173 cm)
- Weight: 170 lb (77 kg; 12 st 2 lb)
- Position: Centre
- Shot: Left
- Played for: Montreal Canadiens; Minnesota North Stars; Edmonton Oilers; Philadelphia Flyers; Washington Capitals; New York Islanders
- National team: Canada
- NHL draft: 103rd overall, 1978; Montreal Canadiens
- Playing career: 1978–1995

Keith Edward Acton (born April 15, 1958) is a Canadian former professional ice hockey centre who played 15 seasons in the National Hockey League (NHL), with the Montreal Canadiens, Minnesota North Stars, Edmonton Oilers, Philadelphia Flyers, Washington Capitals and New York Islanders between 1980 and 1994. In his NHL coaching career, he has been an assistant coach with the Columbus Blue Jackets, the Philadelphia Flyers, the New York Rangers, the Toronto Maple Leafs, and, most recently, the Edmonton Oilers, who released Acton and fellow assistant Craig Ramsay on June 4, 2015.

Acton ran for mayor of Whitchurch-Stouffville in the 2018 elections.

== Playing career ==
=== Montreal Canadiens (1978–1984) ===
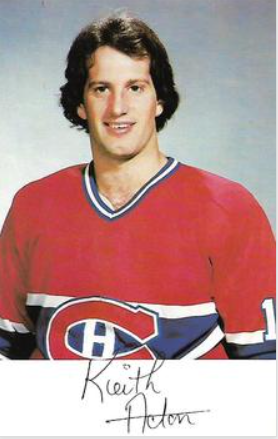
1980 photo of Acton for Montreal Canadiens

Acton was selected 103rd overall by the Montreal Canadiens in the 1978 NHL Amateur Draft. He spent most of the first two seasons of his career in the American Hockey League (AHL), playing for the Nova Scotia Voyageurs, who were the Montreal Canadiens' AHL affiliate team at the time. He would also play 2 games for Montreal at this time, making his NHL debut on December 11, 1979 against the New York Islanders. In his first game he would record his first point in the NHL, an assist on a goal scored by Guy Lapointe.

Acton would make Montreal's final roster in the beginning of the 1980–81 season. He would score his first NHL goal on October 21, 1980 in a 3–4 loss against the St. Louis Blues. He finished his first full season in the NHL with 30 points in 61 games.

His most productive NHL season came in 1981–82 when he registered 88 points in 78 games with Montreal. He began the season on Montreal's fourth line but his productive play soon earned him a promotion to the first line, where he centered all-stars Steve Shutt and Guy Lafleur. He became known as one of the best faceoff men in the NHL. Acton would score two hat tricks during the season. He would score his first in an 11–2 victory against the Philadelphia Flyers on October 27, 1981. His second hat trick would happen almost a month later on November 21, 1981 in a 9–5 victory over the Pittsburgh Penguins. Acton would play in the 1982 NHL All-Star Game.

When his production dipped in the 1982–83 season to just fifty points, his stock in Montreal fell, leading to Acton being traded early in the 1983-84 season. On October 28, 1983, Acton was traded alongside teammate Mark Napier to the Minnesota North Stars for Bobby Smith.

=== Minnesota North Stars (1983–1988) ===
With Minnesota, Acton reeled off three consecutive 20-goal seasons. On January 22, 1988, after a slow start to the 1987-88 season, Acton was traded to the Edmonton Oilers in exchange for Moe Mantha.

=== Edmonton Oilers (1988–1989) ===
With Edmonton and their high-powered offence, Acton was not expected to help carry the offence and settled into a more defensive role. That spring he won the Stanley Cup though he played just seven games in the postseason. Acton was a healthy scratch through the first two rounds and remained in the press box through the first three games of the conference final against the Detroit Red Wings. However, with the Oilers' coaching staff looking for more speed on their fourth line, Acton was inserted into the lineup for game four and he paid immediate dividends, scoring the series-clinching goal. His clutch play continued in the Stanley Cup Finals when he ended game one against the Boston Bruins by tipping a Steve Smith point shot for the game-winning goal. Despite his playoff heroics, it still proved difficult to carve out a place on the Oilers' deep roster and late in the 1988-89 season, on February 7, 1989, Acton was traded to the Philadelphia Flyers for Dave Brown.

=== Philadelphia Flyers (1989–1993) ===
Acton spent the next four seasons with the Flyers. Acton would only play 50 games in the 1991–92 season after breaking his wrist. After his contract ran out, the Flyers decided to release Acton, and he would become a free agent for the first time in his career.

=== Washington Capitals, New York Islanders and retirement (1993–1995) ===
During the 1993-94 season he signed with the Washington Capitals but was put on waivers after just six games, and was claimed by the New York Islanders, where he would play for the rest of the season. Acton would sign with the Hershey Bears of the American Hockey League (AHL) for the 1994–95 season, where he would play 12 games before retiring from professional hockey.

== Coaching career ==
After retiring from playing, Acton would become the assistant coach of multiple NHL teams including the Philadelphia Flyers, New York Rangers, Toronto Maple Leafs, Columbus Blue Jackets, and Edmonton Oilers.

== Personal life ==
Acton's son, Will, is also a hockey player. Like his father, Will played parts of two seasons with the Edmonton Oilers. After playing in the DEL for five seasons, Will retired from playing and is currently a pro scout for the Pittsburgh Penguins.

In 2018, Acton became a candidate for mayor of Whitchurch-Stouffville, Ontario, in the Ontario municipal elections in which he came in second.

== Awards and achievements ==
- 1979-80 AHL Second Team All-Star
- 1987–88 - NHL - Stanley Cup (Edmonton)

== Career statistics ==
=== Regular season and playoffs ===
			Regular season					Playoffs
Season	Team	League	GP	G	A	Pts	PIM	GP	G	A	Pts	PIM
1974–75	Wexford Raiders	OPJHL	43	23	29	52	46	—	—	—	—	—
1975–76	Peterborough Petes	OMJHL	35	9	17	26	30	—	—	—	—	—
1976–77	Peterborough Petes	OMJHL	65	52	69	121	93	4	1	4	5	6
1977–78	Peterborough Petes	OMJHL	68	42	86	128	52	21	10	8	18	16
1977–78	Peterborough Petes	MC	—	—	—	—	—	3	0	1	1	0
1978–79	Nova Scotia Voyageurs	AHL	79	15	26	41	22	10	4	2	6	4
1979–80	Montreal Canadiens	NHL	2	0	1	1	0	—	—	—	—	—
1979–80	Nova Scotia Voyageurs	AHL	75	45	53	98	38	6	1	2	3	8
1980–81	Montreal Canadiens	NHL	61	15	24	39	74	2	0	0	0	6
1981–82	Montreal Canadiens	NHL	78	36	52	88	88	5	0	4	4	16
1982–83	Montreal Canadiens	NHL	78	24	26	50	63	3	0	0	0	0
1983–84	Montreal Canadiens	NHL	9	3	7	10	4	—	—	—	—	—
1983–84	Minnesota North Stars	NHL	62	17	38	55	60	15	4	7	11	12
1984–85	Minnesota North Stars	NHL	78	20	38	58	90	9	4	4	8	6
1985–86	Minnesota North Stars	NHL	79	26	32	58	100	5	0	3	3	6
1986–87	Minnesota North Stars	NHL	78	16	29	45	56	—	—	—	—	—
1987–88	Minnesota North Stars	NHL	46	8	11	19	74	—	—	—	—	—
1987–88	Edmonton Oilers	NHL	26	3	6	9	21	7	2	0	2	16
1988–89	Edmonton Oilers	NHL	46	11	15	26	47	—	—	—	—	—
1988–89	Philadelphia Flyers	NHL	25	3	10	13	64	16	2	3	5	18
1989–90	Philadelphia Flyers	NHL	69	13	14	27	80	—	—	—	—	—
1990–91	Philadelphia Flyers	NHL	76	14	23	37	131	—	—	—	—	—
1991–92	Philadelphia Flyers	NHL	50	7	10	17	98	—	—	—	—	—
1992–93	Philadelphia Flyers	NHL	83	8	15	23	51	—	—	—	—	—
1993–94	Washington Capitals	NHL	6	0	0	0	21	—	—	—	—	—
1993–94	New York Islanders	NHL	71	2	7	9	50	4	0	0	0	8
1994–95	Hershey Bears	AHL	12	5	7	12	58	—	—	—	—	—
NHL totals			1,023	226	358	584	1,172	66	12	21	33	88

=== International ===
Year	Team	Event	GP	G	A	Pts	PIM
1986	Canada	WC	10	3	0	3	2
1990	Canada	WC	10	2	0	2	0
1992	Canada	WC	6	1	0	1	2
Senior totals			26	6	0	6	4

== Coaching statistics ==
Season  Team                Lge Type 
1994-95 Philadelphia Flyers NHL Assistant               
1995-96 Philadelphia Flyers NHL Assistant               
1996-97 Philadelphia Flyers NHL Assistant               
1997-98 Philadelphia Flyers NHL Associate               
1998-99 New York Rangers    NHL Assistant               
1999-00 New York Rangers    NHL Assistant               
2001-02 Toronto Maple Leafs NHL Assistant               
2002-03 Toronto Maple Leafs NHL Assistant               
2003-04 Toronto Maple Leafs NHL Assistant               
2005-06 Toronto Maple Leafs NHL Assistant               
2006-07 Toronto Maple Leafs NHL Assistant               
2007-08 Toronto Maple Leafs NHL Assistant 
2008-09 Toronto Maple Leafs NHL Assistant 
2009-10 Toronto Maple Leafs NHL Assistant 
2010-11 Toronto Maple Leafs NHL Assistant
2013-14 Edmonton Oilers     NHL Assistant

== See also ==
- List of NHL players with 1,000 games played
