= Rick Wamsley =

Canadian ice hockey player (born 1959)

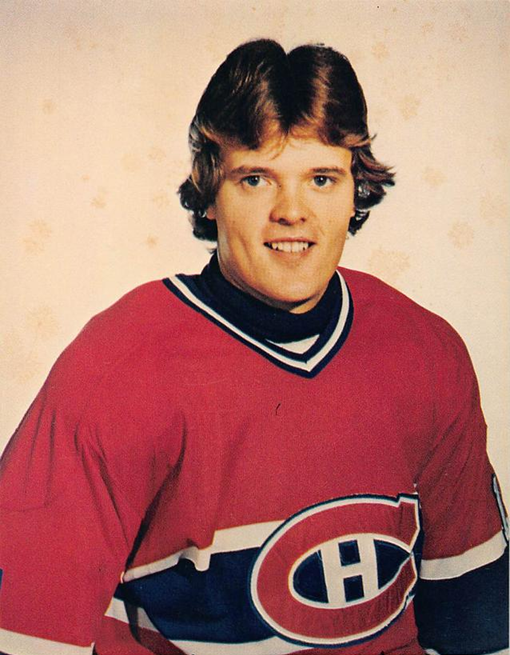
- Born: May 25, 1959 (age 67) Simcoe, Ontario, Canada
- Height: 5 ft 11 in (180 cm)
- Weight: 185 lb (84 kg; 13 st 3 lb)
- Position: Goaltender
- Caught: Left
- Played for: Montreal Canadiens; St. Louis Blues; Calgary Flames; Toronto Maple Leafs
- National team: Canada
- NHL draft: 58th overall, 1979; Montreal Canadiens
- Playing career: 1979–1993

Medal record

Representing Canada

World Championships
Silver medal – second place	1985 Czechoslovakia	
Bronze medal – third place	1983 West Germany	

Richard James Wamsley (born May 25, 1959) is a Canadian former professional ice hockey goaltender who played in the National Hockey League (NHL) for the Montreal Canadiens, St. Louis Blues, Calgary Flames and Toronto Maple Leafs. He was the goaltending coach for the NHL's Ottawa Senators until his firing by new general manager Pierre Dorion on April 12, 2016.

== Career ==
Drafted by the Montreal Canadiens in 1979, Wamsley played with the Nova Scotia Voyageurs before being called up to the big team. He spent three successful seasons in Montreal before being shipped to St. Louis in exchange for the draft picks which the Canadiens would ultimately use to select future players Shayne Corson and Stéphane Richer.

Wamsley and Denis Herron shared the William M. Jennings Trophy with Montreal in 1982. Wamsley was traded to the Calgary Flames with Rob Ramage for Brett Hull and would be a part of their Stanley Cup team in 1989.

Wamsley joined the Toronto Maple Leafs' organization as a goaltending consultant immediately after retiring following the 1992–93 season. He would spend six seasons as a member of the organization, becoming an assistant coach under Pat Burns from 1994–96, and then serving as a pro and amateur scout until 1999.

He would later serve as a goaltending coach for the St. Louis Blues and pro scout and goaltending coach with the Columbus Blue Jackets.

On July 28, 2010, Wamsley joined the Ottawa Senators organization in the capacity of goaltending coach, before leaving in 2016.

== Career statistics ==
=== Regular season and playoffs ===
			Regular season									Playoffs
Season	Team	League	GP	W	L	T	MIN	GA	SO	GAA	SV%	GP	W	L	MIN	GA	SO	GAA	SV%
1976–77	St. Catharines Fincups	OMJHL	12	—	—	—	647	36	0	3.34	—	3	0	1	132	10	0	4.52	—
1977–78	Hamilton Fincups	OMJHL	25	—	—	—	1495	74	2	2.97	—	3	2	1	333	9	0	2.90	—
1978–79	Brantford Alexanders	OMJHL	24	—	—	—	1444	128	0	5.32	—	—	—	—	—	—	—	—	—
1979–80	Nova Scotia Voyageurs	AHL	40	19	16	2	2305	125	2	3.25	.887	3	1	1	143	12	0	5.03	—
1980–81	Nova Scotia Voyageurs	AHL	43	17	19	3	2372	155	0	3.92	.872	4	2	1	199	6	1	1.81	—
1980–81	Montreal Canadiens	NHL	5	3	0	1	253	8	1	1.90	.926	—	—	—	—	—	—	—	—
1981–82	Montreal Canadiens	NHL	38	23	7	7	2206	101	2	2.75	.893	5	2	3	300	11	0	2.20	.892
1982–83	Montreal Canadiens	NHL	46	27	12	5	2583	151	0	3.51	.878	3	0	3	152	7	0	2.76	.891
1983–84	Montreal Canadiens	NHL	42	19	17	3	2333	144	2	3.70	.853	1	0	0	32	0	0	0.00	1.000
1984–85	St. Louis Blues	NHL	40	23	12	5	2319	126	0	3.20	.885	2	0	2	120	7	0	3.50	.875
1985–86	St. Louis Blues	NHL	42	22	16	3	2410	142	0	3.54	.894	10	4	6	569	37	0	3.90	.879
1986–87	St. Louis Blues	NHL	41	17	15	6	2410	142	0	3.54	.883	2	1	1	120	5	0	2.50	.907
1987–88	St. Louis Blues	NHL	31	13	16	1	1818	103	2	3.40	.888	—	—	—	—	—	—	—	—
1987–88	Calgary Flames	NHL	2	1	0	0	73	5	0	4.11	.861	1	0	1	31	2	0	3.64	.750
1988–89	Calgary Flames	NHL	35	17	11	4	1927	95	2	2.96	.881	1	0	1	20	2	0	6.00	.800
1989–90	Calgary Flames	NHL	36	18	8	6	1969	107	2	3.26	.875	1	0	1	49	9	0	11.02	.609
1990–91	Calgary Flames	NHL	29	14	7	5	1670	85	0	3.05	.888	1	0	0	2	1	0	30.00	.500
1991–92	Calgary Flames	NHL	9	3	4	0	457	34	0	4.46	.850	—	—	—	—	—	—	—	—
1991–92	Toronto Maple Leafs	NHL	8	4	3	0	428	27	0	3.79	.876	—	—	—	—	—	—	—	—
1992–93	Toronto Maple Leafs	NHL	3	0	3	0	160	15	0	5.63	.835	—	—	—	—	—	—	—	—
1992–93	St. John's Maple Leafs	AHL	2	0	1	0	112	8	0	4.29	.875	—	—	—	—	—	—	—	—
NHL totals			407	204	131	46	23121	1287	12	3.34	.881	27	7	18	1396	81	0	3.48	.873

=== International ===
Year	Team	Event	Result	GP	W	L	OTL	MIN	GA	SO	GAA	SV%
1983	Canada	WC	3rd place, bronze medalist(s)	10	6	4	0	600	30	1	3.00	.909
1985	Canada	WC	2nd place, silver medalist(s)	2	1	1	0	120	11	0	5.50	.838
Senior totals				12	7	5	0	720	41	1	3.42	.897
