= 1983–84 Washington Capitals season =

NHL hockey team season

1983–84 Washington Capitals
- Division: 2nd Patrick
- Conference: 4th Wales
- 1983–84 record: 48–27–5
- Home record: 26–11–3
- Road record: 22–16–2
- Goals for: 308
- Goals against: 226

Team information
- General manager: David Poile
- Coach: Bryan Murray
- Captain: Rod Langway
- Alternate captains: None
- Arena: Capital Centre

Team leaders
- Goals: Mike Gartner (40)
- Assists: Dave Christian (52)
- Points: Mike Gartner (85)
- Penalty minutes: Scott Stevens (201)
- Plus/minus: Bengt-Ake Gustafsson (+29)
- Wins: Al Jensen (25)
- Goals against average: Pat Riggin (2.67)

The 1983–84 Washington Capitals season was the Washington Capitals tenth season in the National Hockey League (NHL). They qualified for the playoffs for the second year in a row.

== Regular season ==
=== Final standings ===
Patrick Division
| | GP | W | L | T | GF | GA | Pts |
|---|---|---|---|---|---|---|---|
| **New York Islanders** | 80 | 50 | 26 | 4 | 357 | 269 | 104 |
| **Washington Capitals** | 80 | 48 | 27 | 5 | 308 | 226 | 101 |
| **Philadelphia Flyers** | 80 | 44 | 26 | 10 | 350 | 290 | 98 |
| **New York Rangers** | 80 | 42 | 29 | 9 | 314 | 304 | 93 |
| New Jersey Devils | 80 | 17 | 56 | 7 | 231 | 350 | 41 |
| Pittsburgh Penguins | 80 | 16 | 58 | 6 | 254 | 390 | 38 |

Note: GP = Games played, W = Wins, L = Losses, T = Ties, Pts = Points, GF = Goals for, GA = Goals against
Note: Teams that qualified for the playoffs are highlighted in bold.

=== Record vs. opponents ===
Patrick Division record vs. opponents

==== Vs. Wales Conference ====
**Vs. Patrick Division**

1983–84 NHL records
| Team | **NJD** | **NYI** | **NYR** | **PHI** | **PIT** | **WSH** | **Total** |
|---|---|---|---|---|---|---|---|
| New Jersey | — | 0−7 | 1−5−1 | 0−7 | 3−4 | 0−5−2 | 4−28−3 |
| N.Y. Islanders | 7−0 | — | 3−4 | 4−3 | 6−1 | 4−3 | 24−11−0 |
| N.Y. Rangers | 5−1−1 | 4−3 | — | 4−3 | 5−2 | 3−3−1 | 21−12−2 |
| Philadelphia | 7−0 | 3−4 | 3−4 | — | 7−0 | 3−4 | 23−12−0 |
| Pittsburgh | 4−3 | 1−6 | 2−5 | 0–7 | — | 1−6 | 8−27−0 |
| Washington | 5−0−2 | 3−4 | 3−3−1 | 4–3 | 6–1 | — | 21−11−3 |

**Vs. Adams Division**

1983–84 NHL records
| Team | **BOS** | **BUF** | **HFD** | **MTL** | **QUE** | **Total** |
|---|---|---|---|---|---|---|
| New Jersey | 1−2 | 0−2−1 | 1−1−1 | 1−2 | 1−2 | 4−9−2 |
| N.Y. Islanders | 0−2−1 | 3−0 | 1−2 | 3−0 | 1−2 | 8−6−1 |
| N.Y. Rangers | 0−2−1 | 1−1−1 | 1−2 | 1−2 | 2−0−1 | 5−7−3 |
| Philadelphia | 1−1−1 | 0−3 | 1−2 | 2−0−1 | 2−0−1 | 6−6−3 |
| Pittsburgh | 0−3 | 0−3 | 2−1 | 0−2−1 | 0−3 | 2−12−1 |
| Washington | 1−2 | 0−2−1 | 2−1 | 3−0 | 1−2 | 7−7−1 |

==== Vs. Campbell Conference ====
**Vs. Norris Division**

1983–84 NHL records
| Team | **CHI** | **DET** | **MIN** | **STL** | **TOR** | **Total** |
|---|---|---|---|---|---|---|
| New Jersey | 2−1 | 2−1 | 1−2 | 0−3 | 0−3 | 5−10−0 |
| N.Y. Islanders | 3−0 | 1−2 | 2−0−1 | 1−1−1 | 2−1 | 9−4−2 |
| N.Y. Rangers | 2−1 | 3−0 | 1−1−1 | 2−1 | 1−2 | 9−5−1 |
| Philadelphia | 1−0−2 | 1−0−2 | 0−1−2 | 1−2 | 3−0 | 6−3−6 |
| Pittsburgh | 1−1−1 | 0−3 | 1−2 | 0−2−1 | 1−1−1 | 3−9−3 |
| Washington | 1−1−1 | 1−2 | 3−0 | 2−1 | 3−0 | 10−4−1 |

**Vs. Smythe Division**

1983–84 NHL records
| Team | **CGY** | **EDM** | **LAK** | **VAN** | **WIN** | **Total** |
|---|---|---|---|---|---|---|
| New Jersey | 0−2−1 | 0−2−1 | 2−1 | 1−2 | 1−2 | 4−9−2 |
| N.Y. Islanders | 0−3 | 3−0 | 2−0−1 | 3−0 | 1−2 | 9−5−1 |
| N.Y. Rangers | 2−1 | 1−2 | 1−0−2 | 1−1−1 | 2−1 | 7−5−3 |
| Philadelphia | 2−1 | 2−0−1 | 2−1 | 1−2 | 2−1 | 9−5−1 |
| Pittsburgh | 0−1−2 | 0−3 | 1−2 | 1−2 | 1−2 | 3−10−2 |
| Washington | 2−1 | 1−2 | 3−0 | 2−1 | 2−1 | 10−5−0 |

== Schedule and results ==
=== Regular season ===
1983–84 game log
October: 5–7–0 (home: 1–3–0; road: 4–4–0)

| Game | Result | Date | Score | Opponent | Record |
|---|---|---|---|---|---|
| 1 | L | October 6, 1983 | 1–4 | @ Philadelphia Flyers (1983–84) | 0–1–0 |
| 2 | L | October 8, 1983 | 7–8 OT | New York Islanders (1983–84) | 0–2–0 |
| 3 | L | October 9, 1983 | 2–5 | @ Buffalo Sabres (1983–84) | 0–3–0 |
| 4 | L | October 13, 1983 | 3–4 | @ New York Rangers (1983–84) | 0–4–0 |
| 5 | L | October 14, 1983 | 0–4 | Pittsburgh Penguins (1983–84) | 0–5–0 |
| 6 | L | October 16, 1983 | 2–4 | Quebec Nordiques (1983–84) | 0–6–0 |
| 7 | L | October 19, 1983 | 0–3 | @ Hartford Whalers (1983–84) | 0–7–0 |
| 8 | W | October 22, 1983 | 4–1 | Philadelphia Flyers (1983–84) | 1–7–0 |
| 9 | W | October 25, 1983 | 1–0 | @ Pittsburgh Penguins (1983–84) | 2–7–0 |
| 10 | W | October 26, 1983 | 2–0 | @ New Jersey Devils (1983–84) | 3–7–0 |
| 11 | W | October 29, 1983 | 6–1 | @ Minnesota North Stars (1983–84) | 4–7–0 |
| 12 | W | October 30, 1983 | 7–3 | @ Winnipeg Jets (1983–84) | 5–7–0 |

November: 6–6–1 (home: 5–1–1; road: 1–5–0)

| Game | Result | Date | Score | Opponent | Record |
|---|---|---|---|---|---|
| 13 | L | November 2, 1983 | 3–11 | @ Edmonton Oilers (1983–84) | 5–8–0 |
| 14 | W | November 4, 1983 | 5–4 OT | Vancouver Canucks (1983–84) | 6–8–0 |
| 15 | W | November 6, 1983 | 3–2 | Detroit Red Wings (1983–84) | 7–8–0 |
| 16 | L | November 9, 1983 | 4–7 | Edmonton Oilers (1983–84) | 7–9–0 |
| 17 | W | November 12, 1983 | 7–4 | New York Rangers (1983–84) | 8–9–0 |
| 18 | L | November 13, 1983 | 2–4 | @ Boston Bruins (1983–84) | 8–10–0 |
| 19 | L | November 16, 1983 | 1–4 | @ New York Rangers (1983–84) | 8–11–0 |
| 20 | W | November 18, 1983 | 7–1 | New York Islanders (1983–84) | 9–11–0 |
| 21 | L | November 19, 1983 | 2–6 | @ New York Islanders (1983–84) | 9–12–0 |
| 22 | T | November 23, 1983 | 2–2 OT | Chicago Black Hawks (1983–84) | 9–12–1 |
| 23 | W | November 25, 1983 | 3–1 | New York Rangers (1983–84) | 10–12–1 |
| 24 | W | November 26, 1983 | 5–2 | @ Montreal Canadiens (1983–84) | 11–12–1 |
| 25 | L | November 29, 1983 | 3–6 | @ Quebec Nordiques (1983–84) | 11–13–1 |

December: 7–6–1 (home: 5–3–0; road: 2–3–1)

| Game | Result | Date | Score | Opponent | Record |
|---|---|---|---|---|---|
| 26 | W | December 1, 1983 | 8–4 | New Jersey Devils (1983–84) | 12–13–1 |
| 27 | T | December 2, 1983 | 2–2 OT | @ New Jersey Devils (1983–84) | 12–13–2 |
| 28 | L | December 4, 1983 | 1–4 | Boston Bruins (1983–84) | 12–14–2 |
| 29 | L | December 7, 1983 | 5–7 | @ New York Rangers (1983–84) | 12–15–2 |
| 30 | W | December 8, 1983 | 4–3 | Calgary Flames (1983–84) | 13–15–2 |
| 31 | W | December 10, 1983 | 2–0 | Montreal Canadiens (1983–84) | 14–15–2 |
| 32 | L | December 15, 1983 | 4–9 | @ Philadelphia Flyers (1983–84) | 14–16–2 |
| 33 | W | December 17, 1983 | 3–1 | @ Toronto Maple Leafs (1983–84) | 15–16–2 |
| 34 | W | December 18, 1983 | 5–0 | Los Angeles Kings (1983–84) | 16–16–2 |
| 35 | L | December 22, 1983 | 1–6 | @ New York Islanders (1983–84) | 16–17–2 |
| 36 | W | December 23, 1983 | 7–3 | New York Islanders (1983–84) | 17–17–2 |
| 37 | L | December 26, 1983 | 4–5 | Philadelphia Flyers (1983–84) | 17–18–2 |
| 38 | L | December 28, 1983 | 2–3 OT | Detroit Red Wings (1983–84) | 17–19–2 |
| 39 | W | December 31, 1983 | 3–2 | @ New Jersey Devils (1983–84) | 18–19–2 |

January: 9–2–2 (home: 5–1–1; road: 4–1–1)

| Game | Result | Date | Score | Opponent | Record |
|---|---|---|---|---|---|
| 40 | T | January 2, 1984 | 2–2 OT | New York Rangers (1983–84) | 18–19–3 |
| 41 | W | January 5, 1984 | 5–1 | St. Louis Blues (1983–84) | 19–19–3 |
| 42 | L | January 7, 1984 | 2–4 | Buffalo Sabres (1983–84) | 19–20–3 |
| 43 | W | January 8, 1984 | 7–1 | @ Philadelphia Flyers (1983–84) | 20–20–3 |
| 44 | W | January 11, 1984 | 4–2 | @ Los Angeles Kings (1983–84) | 21–20–3 |
| 45 | W | January 13, 1984 | 6–4 | @ Vancouver Canucks (1983–84) | 22–20–3 |
| 46 | L | January 15, 1984 | 2–3 | @ Calgary Flames (1983–84) | 22–21–3 |
| 47 | W | January 17, 1984 | 8–3 | Winnipeg Jets (1983–84) | 23–21–3 |
| 48 | W | January 20, 1984 | 5–3 | Chicago Black Hawks (1983–84) | 24–21–3 |
| 49 | W | January 21, 1984 | 3–2 | @ Pittsburgh Penguins (1983–84) | 25–21–3 |
| 50 | T | January 25, 1984 | 2–2 OT | @ Buffalo Sabres (1983–84) | 25–21–4 |
| 51 | W | January 27, 1984 | 6–1 | Toronto Maple Leafs (1983–84) | 26–21–4 |
| 52 | W | January 28, 1984 | 8–0 | @ Toronto Maple Leafs (1983–84) | 27–21–4 |

February: 9–4–0 (home: 4–1–0; road: 5–3–0)

| Game | Result | Date | Score | Opponent | Record |
|---|---|---|---|---|---|
| 53 | W | February 2, 1984 | 2–0 | @ New Jersey Devils (1983–84) | 28–21–4 |
| 54 | W | February 3, 1984 | 4–1 | Montreal Canadiens (1983–84) | 29–21–4 |
| 55 | W | February 5, 1984 | 9–2 | Edmonton Oilers (1983–84) | 30–21–4 |
| 56 | W | February 8, 1984 | 6–1 | Calgary Flames (1983–84) | 31–21–4 |
| 57 | W | February 11, 1984 | 6–3 | Philadelphia Flyers (1983–84) | 32–21–4 |
| 58 | W | February 13, 1984 | 4–0 | @ Minnesota North Stars (1983–84) | 33–21–4 |
| 59 | W | February 16, 1984 | 4–2 | @ Los Angeles Kings (1983–84) | 34–21–4 |
| 60 | W | February 18, 1984 | 4–2 | @ St. Louis Blues (1983–84) | 35–21–4 |
| 61 | L | February 19, 1984 | 3–4 OT | @ Winnipeg Jets (1983–84) | 35–22–4 |
| 62 | L | February 22, 1984 | 2–4 | @ Chicago Black Hawks (1983–84) | 35–23–4 |
| 63 | L | February 25, 1984 | 1–4 | @ Detroit Red Wings (1983–84) | 35–24–4 |
| 64 | W | February 26, 1984 | 4–3 | @ Hartford Whalers (1983–84) | 36–24–4 |
| 65 | L | February 28, 1984 | 2–3 | Vancouver Canucks (1983–84) | 36–25–4 |

March: 11–2–1 (home: 7–2–1; road: 4–0–0)

| Game | Result | Date | Score | Opponent | Record |
|---|---|---|---|---|---|
| 66 | W | March 1, 1984 | 9–1 | Pittsburgh Penguins (1983–84) | 37–25–4 |
| 67 | W | March 3, 1984 | 5–1 | New York Rangers (1983–84) | 38–25–4 |
| 68 | W | March 5, 1984 | 5–2 | @ Pittsburgh Penguins (1983–84) | 39–25–4 |
| 69 | W | March 7, 1984 | 4–2 | Hartford Whalers (1983–84) | 40–25–4 |
| 70 | W | March 9, 1984 | 5–3 | Quebec Nordiques (1983–84) | 41–25–4 |
| 71 | W | March 11, 1984 | 2–1 | @ Boston Bruins (1983–84) | 42–25–4 |
| 72 | T | March 14, 1984 | 3–3 OT | New Jersey Devils (1983–84) | 42–25–5 |
| 73 | W | March 17, 1984 | 2–1 | @ New York Islanders (1983–84) | 43–25–5 |
| 74 | L | March 18, 1984 | 3–5 | St. Louis Blues (1983–84) | 43–26–5 |
| 75 | W | March 21, 1984 | 5–1 | Minnesota North Stars (1983–84) | 44–26–5 |
| 76 | W | March 24, 1984 | 6–0 | Pittsburgh Penguins (1983–84) | 45–26–5 |
| 77 | W | March 25, 1984 | 4–3 | @ Pittsburgh Penguins (1983–84) | 46–26–5 |
| 78 | W | March 28, 1984 | 6–2 | New Jersey Devils (1983–84) | 47–26–5 |
| 79 | L | March 31, 1984 | 1–3 | New York Islanders (1983–84) | 47–27–5 |

April: 1–0–0 (home: 0–0–0; road: 1–0–0)

| Game | Result | Date | Score | Opponent | Record |
|---|---|---|---|---|---|
| 80 | W | April 1, 1984 | 4–1 | @ Philadelphia Flyers (1983–84) | 48–27–5 |

Win (2 points) Loss (0 points) Tie (1 point)

=== Playoffs ===
1984 Stanley Cup Playoffs
Patrick Division Semifinals vs (P3) Philadelphia Flyers: Washington won 3–0

| # | Date | Visitor | Score | Home | OT | Decision | Location | Attendance | Series | Recap |
|---|---|---|---|---|---|---|---|---|---|---|
| 1 | April 4 | Philadelphia | 2–4 | Washington | | | Capital Centre | | 1–0 | |
| 2 | April 5 | Philadelphia | 2–6 | Washington | | | Capital Centre | | 2–0 | |
| 3 | April 7 | Washington | 5–1 | Philadelphia | | | Spectrum | | 3–0 | |

Patrick Division Finals vs (P1) New York Islanders: NY Islanders won 4–1

| # | Date | Visitor | Score | Home | OT | Decision | Location | Attendance | Series | Recap |
|---|---|---|---|---|---|---|---|---|---|---|
| 1 | April 12 | Washington | 3–2 | NY Islanders | | | Nassau Coliseum | | 1–0 | |
| 2 | April 13 | Washington | 4–5 | NY Islanders | OT | | Nassau Coliseum | | 1–1 | |
| 3 | April 15 | NY Islanders | 3–1 | Washington | | | Capital Centre | | 1–2 | |
| 4 | April 16 | NY Islanders | 5–2 | Washington | | | Capital Centre | | 1–3 | |
| 5 | April 18 | Washington | 3–5 | NY Islanders | | | Nassau Coliseum | | 1–4 | |

Win Loss

== Player statistics ==
=== Regular season ===
Scoring

| Player | Pos | GP | G | A | Pts | PIM | +/- | PPG | SHG | GWG |
|---|---|---|---|---|---|---|---|---|---|---|
| Mike Gartner | RW | 80 | 40 | 45 | 85 | 90 | 22 | 8 | 0 | 7 |
| Dave Christian | RW | 80 | 29 | 52 | 81 | 28 | 26 | 9 | 0 | 6 |
| Bengt-Ake Gustafsson | RW | 69 | 32 | 43 | 75 | 16 | 29 | 8 | 0 | 5 |
| Bobby Carpenter | C | 80 | 28 | 40 | 68 | 51 | 0 | 8 | 0 | 5 |
| Alan Haworth | C | 75 | 24 | 31 | 55 | 52 | 14 | 7 | 0 | 5 |
| Craig Laughlin | RW | 80 | 20 | 32 | 52 | 69 | 4 | 7 | 0 | 3 |
| Larry Murphy | D | 72 | 13 | 33 | 46 | 50 | 12 | 2 | 0 | 2 |
| Scott Stevens | D | 78 | 13 | 32 | 45 | 201 | 26 | 7 | 0 | 2 |
| Doug Jarvis | C | 80 | 13 | 29 | 42 | 12 | 7 | 0 | 2 | 0 |
| Bobby Gould | RW | 78 | 21 | 19 | 40 | 74 | -2 | 4 | 0 | 4 |
| Gaetan Duchesne | LW | 79 | 17 | 19 | 36 | 29 | 15 | 3 | 2 | 1 |
| Glen Currie | C | 80 | 12 | 24 | 36 | 20 | 9 | 0 | 2 | 2 |
| Rod Langway | D | 80 | 9 | 24 | 33 | 61 | 14 | 1 | 2 | 2 |
| Bryan Erickson | RW | 45 | 12 | 17 | 29 | 16 | 10 | 4 | 0 | 2 |
| Darren Veitch | D | 46 | 6 | 18 | 24 | 17 | 0 | 4 | 0 | 0 |
| Timo Blomqvist | D | 65 | 1 | 19 | 20 | 84 | 17 | 0 | 0 | 0 |
| Dave Shand | D | 72 | 4 | 15 | 19 | 124 | 23 | 0 | 0 | 0 |
| Chris Valentine | C | 22 | 6 | 5 | 11 | 21 | -8 | 2 | 0 | 1 |
| Peter Andersson | D | 42 | 3 | 7 | 10 | 20 | 12 | 2 | 0 | 0 |
| Greg Adams | LW | 57 | 2 | 6 | 8 | 133 | 1 | 0 | 0 | 0 |
| Gary McAdam | LW | 24 | 1 | 5 | 6 | 12 | 0 | 0 | 0 | 1 |
| Greg Theberge | D | 13 | 1 | 2 | 3 | 4 | -4 | 1 | 0 | 0 |
| Gary Sampson | LW | 15 | 1 | 1 | 2 | 6 | 1 | 0 | 0 | 0 |
| Brian Engblom | D | 6 | 0 | 1 | 1 | 8 | -4 | 0 | 0 | 0 |
| Paul MacKinnon | D | 12 | 0 | 1 | 1 | 4 | -7 | 0 | 0 | 0 |
| Dean Evason | C | 2 | 0 | 0 | 0 | 2 | 0 | 0 | 0 | 0 |
| Lou Franceschetti | RW | 2 | 0 | 0 | 0 | 0 | -2 | 0 | 0 | 0 |
| Andre Hidi | LW | 1 | 0 | 0 | 0 | 0 | 0 | 0 | 0 | 0 |
| Ken Houston | RW | 4 | 0 | 0 | 0 | 4 | -2 | 0 | 0 | 0 |
| Al Jensen | G | 43 | 0 | 0 | 0 | 22 | 0 | 0 | 0 | 0 |
| Bob Mason | G | 2 | 0 | 0 | 0 | 0 | 0 | 0 | 0 | 0 |
| Dave Parro | G | 1 | 0 | 0 | 0 | 0 | 0 | 0 | 0 | 0 |
| Pat Riggin | G | 41 | 0 | 0 | 0 | 4 | 0 | 0 | 0 | 0 |

Goaltending

| Player | MIN | GP | W | L | T | GA | GAA | SO |
|---|---|---|---|---|---|---|---|---|
| Al Jensen | 2414 | 43 | 25 | 13 | 3 | 117 | 2.91 | 4 |
| Pat Riggin | 2299 | 41 | 21 | 14 | 2 | 102 | 2.66 | 4 |
| Bob Mason | 120 | 2 | 2 | 0 | 0 | 3 | 1.50 | 0 |
| Dave Parro | 1 | 1 | 0 | 0 | 0 | 0 | 0.00 | 0 |
| Team: | 4834 | 80 | 48 | 27 | 5 | 222 | 2.76 | 8 |

=== Playoffs ===
Scoring

| Player | Pos | GP | G | A | Pts | PIM | PPG | SHG | GWG |
|---|---|---|---|---|---|---|---|---|---|
| Mike Gartner | RW | 8 | 3 | 7 | 10 | 16 | 2 | 0 | 0 |
| Dave Christian | RW | 8 | 5 | 4 | 9 | 5 | 1 | 0 | 0 |
| Scott Stevens | D | 8 | 1 | 8 | 9 | 21 | 1 | 0 | 0 |
| Craig Laughlin | RW | 8 | 4 | 2 | 6 | 6 | 1 | 0 | 3 |
| Alan Haworth | C | 8 | 3 | 2 | 5 | 4 | 1 | 0 | 0 |
| Bryan Erickson | RW | 8 | 2 | 3 | 5 | 7 | 1 | 0 | 0 |
| Bengt-Ake Gustafsson | RW | 5 | 2 | 3 | 5 | 0 | 2 | 0 | 0 |
| Doug Jarvis | C | 8 | 2 | 3 | 5 | 6 | 0 | 0 | 0 |
| Rod Langway | D | 8 | 0 | 5 | 5 | 7 | 0 | 0 | 0 |
| Bobby Carpenter | C | 8 | 2 | 1 | 3 | 25 | 1 | 0 | 0 |
| Gaetan Duchesne | LW | 8 | 2 | 1 | 3 | 2 | 0 | 0 | 1 |
| Larry Murphy | D | 8 | 0 | 3 | 3 | 6 | 0 | 0 | 0 |
| Bobby Gould | RW | 5 | 0 | 2 | 2 | 4 | 0 | 0 | 0 |
| Glen Currie | C | 8 | 1 | 0 | 1 | 0 | 0 | 0 | 0 |
| Gary Sampson | LW | 8 | 1 | 0 | 1 | 0 | 0 | 0 | 0 |
| Peter Andersson | D | 3 | 0 | 1 | 1 | 2 | 0 | 0 | 0 |
| Al Jensen | G | 6 | 0 | 1 | 1 | 2 | 0 | 0 | 0 |
| Dave Shand | D | 8 | 0 | 1 | 1 | 13 | 0 | 0 | 0 |
| Darren Veitch | D | 5 | 0 | 1 | 1 | 15 | 0 | 0 | 0 |
| Greg Adams | LW | 1 | 0 | 0 | 0 | 0 | 0 | 0 | 0 |
| Timo Blomqvist | D | 8 | 0 | 0 | 0 | 8 | 0 | 0 | 0 |
| Lou Franceschetti | RW | 3 | 0 | 0 | 0 | 8 | 0 | 0 | 0 |
| Andre Hidi | LW | 2 | 0 | 0 | 0 | 0 | 0 | 0 | 0 |
| Pat Riggin | G | 5 | 0 | 0 | 0 | 2 | 0 | 0 | 0 |

Goaltending

| Player | MIN | GP | W | L | GA | GAA | SO |
|---|---|---|---|---|---|---|---|
| Al Jensen | 258 | 6 | 3 | 1 | 14 | 3.26 | 0 |
| Pat Riggin | 230 | 5 | 1 | 3 | 9 | 2.35 | 0 |
| Team: | 488 | 8 | 4 | 4 | 23 | 2.83 | 0 |

Note: GP = Games played; G = Goals; A = Assists; Pts = Points; +/- = Plus/minus; PIM = Penalty minutes; PPG=Power-play goals; SHG=Short-handed goals; GWG=Game-winning goals
MIN=Minutes played; W = Wins; L = Losses; T = Ties; GA = Goals against; GAA = Goals against average; SO = Shutouts;

== Draft picks ==
Washington's draft picks at the 1983 NHL entry draft held at the Montreal Forum in Montreal.

| Round | # | Player | Nationality | College/Junior/Club team (League) |
|---|---|---|---|---|
| 4 | 75 | Tim Bergland | United States | Thief River Falls High School (USHS-MN) |
| 5 | 95 | Martin Bouliane | Canada | Granby Bisons (QMJHL) |
| 7 | 135 | Dwaine Hutton | Canada | Kelowna Wings (WHL) |
| 8 | 155 | Marty Abrams | Canada | Pembroke Lumber Kings (CJAHL) |
| 9 | 175 | Dave Cowan | United States | Washburn High School (USHS-MN) |
| 10 | 195 | Yves Beaudoin | Canada | Shawinigan Cataractes (QMJHL) |
| 11 | 215 | Alain Raymond | Canada | Trois-Rivières Draveurs (QMJHL) |
| 11 | 216 | Anders Huss | Sweden | Gävle (Sweden) |

== See also ==
- 1983–84 NHL season
