= 1983–84 Hartford Whalers season =

National Hockey League team season

1983–84 Hartford Whalers
- Division: 5th Adams
- Conference: 9th Wales
- 1983–84 record: 28–42–10
- Home record: 19–16–5
- Road record: 9–26–5
- Goals for: 288
- Goals against: 320

Team information
- General manager: Emile Francis
- Coach: Jack Evans
- Captain: Mark Johnson
- Arena: Hartford Civic Center
- Average attendance: 11,506 (77.7%)
- Minor league affiliates: Binghamton Whalers (AHL); Flint Generals (IHL)

Team leaders
- Goals: Sylvain Turgeon (40)
- Assists: Ron Francis (60)
- Points: Mark Johnson (87)
- Penalty minutes: Torrie Robertson (198)
- Plus/minus: Randy Pierce (+5)
- Wins: Greg Millen (21)
- Goals against average: Greg Millen (3.70)

The 1983–84 Hartford Whalers season was the Whalers' fifth season in the National Hockey League (NHL). Hartford failed to qualify for the post-season for the fourth consecutive season. The Whalers finished the season with a 28–42–10 record, earning 66 points, which was their highest point total since the 1979–80 season. The club finished nine points behind the fourth place Montreal Canadiens for the final playoff position in the Adams Division.

== Offseason ==
In early May, the Whalers hired Emile Francis as president and general manager of the club. As a player, Francis was a goaltender who played with the Chicago Black Hawks and the New York Rangers from 1946 to 1952, in which he had a record of 32-52-10 and a 3.75 GAA in 95 games. Following his playing career, Francis was the head coach and general manager of the New York Rangers from 1965 to 1976, where he led the team to a 342–209–103 record. From 1970 to 1973, Francis led the Rangers to three consecutive 100+ point seasons. After he was relieved of his duties in January 1976, Francis joined the St. Louis Blues as general manager and executive vice-president. Francis also was the head coach of the team for 124 games, as St. Louis had a 46–64–14 record. Francis accepted the position with Hartford, as St. Louis was having severe financial problems during this time.

At the 1983 NHL entry draft held on June 8 at the Montreal Forum, the Whalers selected left winger Sylvain Turgeon from the Hull Olympiques of the QMJHL with their first round, second overall selection. Turgeon played in 67 games with Hull, scoring 54 goals and 163 points to lead the club in scoring. In eight playoff games, Turgeon scored eight goals and 15 points. Another notable selection by Hartford was defenseman Joe Reekie in the seventh round.

On June 24, the Whalers acquired left winger Norm Dupont from the Winnipeg Jets for a fourth round draft pick in the 1984 NHL entry draft. Dupont scored seven goals and 23 points in 39 games with the Jets during the 1982–83 season. In one playoff game, Dupont had a goal and an assist. In 1980–81, Dupont scored 27 goals and 53 points to finish third in team scoring.

On July 5, Hartford traded defenseman Mickey Volcan to the Calgary Flames in exchange for defensemen Richie Dunn and Joel Quenneville. Dunn played in all 80 games for Calgary in 1982–83, scoring three goals and 14 points. In nine playoff games, Dunn added a goal and two points. Quenneville spent the 1982–83 season with the New Jersey Devils before being traded to Calgary earlier in the off-season. In 74 games with New Jersey, Quenneville scored five goals and 17 points in their first season after they relocated from Colorado prior to the 1982–83 season.

Two days later, on July 7, Hartford hired Jack Evans as the head coach. Evans had previous NHL head coaching experience with the California Golden Seals and Cleveland Barons franchise from 1975 to 1978, where he led the club to a 74–129–37 record in their final three seasons before the team merged with the Minnesota North Stars. From 1978 to 1983, Evans was the head coach of the Salt Lake Golden Eagles of the Central Hockey League, where he led the club to the Adams Cup in 1980 and 1981. As a player, Evans played with the New York Rangers from 1948 to 1958, and the Chicago Black Hawks from 1958 to 1963. He won the Stanley Cup in 1961. In 754 career games, Evans scored 19 goals and 99 points, while in 56 playoff games, he had two goals and four points.

On August 19, the Whalers acquired center Steve Stoyanovich from the New York Islanders for a fifth round draft pick in the 1985 NHL entry draft. Stoyanovich spent the 1982–83 season with the Indianapolis Checkers of the CHL, scoring 41 goals and 84 points in 79 games. In 13 playoff games, Stoyanovich scored six goals and nine points.

On September 7, Hartford acquired right winger Tom Gorence from the Philadelphia Flyers for future considerations. Gorence had seven goals and 14 points in 53 games with the Flyers during 1982–83.

The Whalers reacquired defenseman Marty Howe on September 29, after receiving him from the Boston Bruins for future considerations. Howe had played with the Whalers from 1977 to 1982 before being traded after the 1981–82 season. In 78 games with Boston in 1982–83, Howe had a goal and 12 points, while in 12 playoff games, he earned an assist.

On the next day, September 30, Hartford acquired center Greg Malone from the Pittsburgh Penguins for a third round draft pick in the 1985 NHL entry draft. Malone finished third in Penguins team scoring during the 1982–83 season, scoring 17 goals and 61 points while playing in all 80 games.

The Whalers were busy on October 3, as they traded left winger Greg Adams to the Washington Capitals for left winger Torrie Robertson. Robertson appeared in only five games with Washington in 1982–83, scoring two goals. With the Hershey Bears of the AHL, Robertson scored 21 goals and 54 points in 69 games, while accumulating 187 penalty minutes. In five playoff games with Hershey, Robertson had a goal and three points.

Also on October 3, the Whalers participated in the NHL Waiver Draft, as they acquired center Mike Zuke and right wingers Bob Crawford and Mike Crombeen all from the St. Louis Blues. In 43 games, Zuke had eight goals and 24 points with the Blues in 1982–83. In 1980–81, Zuke finished tenth in the league in voting for the Selke Trophy. Crawford appeared in 27 games with St. Louis in 1982–83, scoring five goals and 14 points. Crombeen scored six goals and 17 points in 80 games with the Blues in 1982–83. Hartford lost defenseman Mark Renaud to the Buffalo Sabres in the draft.

== Regular season ==
=== October ===
The Whalers opened the 1983–84 on the road on October 5 against the Buffalo Sabres, losing the game 5–3. Three nights later, the Whalers hosted the Boston Bruins for their home opener, as Hartford was led by two goals from Bob Crawford in a 4–3 win over the Bruins.

On October 19, Greg Millen stopped all 22 shots he faced in a 3–0 victory over the Washington Capitals, as Hartford improved to 3-2-1 early in the season. Later in the month, on October 25, the Whalers defeated the Los Angeles Kings 8–5, improving the Whalers to 4–3–1.

Hartford lost their last two games of the month, finishing October with a 4–5–1 record. The Whalers were in fourth place in the Adams Division and in the final playoff position, narrowly ahead of the last place Montreal Canadiens by 1 point.

=== November ===
Hartford moved into last place in the Adams Division on November 1, as they lost to the Montreal Canadiens 6–2 at the Montreal Forum. The Whalers responded to this by winning four of their next five games, including a 6–1 blowout victory over the Chicago Black Hawks on November 12 to improve to 8-7-1 to move back into fourth place in the division and hold on to the final playoff position. During this time, on November 10, the Whalers made a trade with the Winnipeg Jets. Hartford traded away goaltender Mark Veisor to the Jets for goaltender Ed Staniowski. Staniowski appeared in only one game with Winnipeg at the time of the trade during the 1983–84 season, going 0-0-0 with a 12.00 GAA and a .600 save percentage.

The Whalers then slumped by going winless in their next four games (0–3–1), dropping them back into last place. Hartford ended their winless skid with a 4–3 overtime win over the New York Rangers on November 26 as Blaine Stoughton scored the winning goal. In their final game of November, the Whalers lost to the Vancouver Canucks 6–2.

Hartford has a record of 5-6-1 during November, bringing their overall record to 9-11-2 through the month. The Whalers were in last place, three points behind the Montreal Canadiens for the fourth and final playoff position in the Adams Division.

=== December ===
The Whalers opened December with two straight victories, including a 7–2 victory over the St. Louis Blues on December 3 in which Mark Johnson recorded the Whalers first hat trick of the season. With the two victories, the Whalers improved to 11-11-5 on the season, earning 27 points, climbing to within one point of the Montreal Canadiens for the final playoff spot.

Hartford fell into a slump, going winless in their next seven games (0–6–1), dropping their record to 11–17–6, before snapping their slump with a 6–3 win over the Buffalo Sabres on December 22. The next night, the Whalers won their second in a row, defeating the Minnesota North Stars 5–3.

Following the Christmas break, Hartford lost their remaining three games in December, including a 9–3 loss to the Los Angeles Kings on December 30.

Hartford struggled to a 4–9–1 record in December. The Whalers had an overall record of 13–20–3, earning 29 points, as the club fell nine points behind the fourth place Montreal Canadiens for the final playoff spot.

=== January ===
Hartford began January the same way they ended December, with a blowout loss, as the Detroit Red Wings destroyed the Whalers 7–1 on January 3. In their next game, the Whalers ended their four-game losing skid with a 4–2 over the defending Stanley Cup champions, the New York Islanders.

The Whalers embarked on a five-game Western road trip, in which they opened it with a 5–3 loss against the Edmonton Oilers, followed by a 4–3 loss to the Winnipeg Jets. The Whalers managed to defeat the Minnesota North Stars in the third game of the trip, followed by a 3–3 tie against the Calgary Flames, however, the trip concluded with a 5–0 loss to the Vancouver Canucks.

The Whalers returned home for a three-game home stand, as the Whalers tied the New Jersey Devils 3-3, followed by two losses. Back on the road on January 24, the Whalers and Montreal Canadiens played to a 7–7 tie, in which the Whalers blew a two-goal lead in the final eight minutes of the game.

The winless streak continued to the end of the month, as Hartford lost to the Winnipeg Jets, followed by a loss and a tie in a home-and-home series against the Quebec Nordiques.

Hartford had a record of 2-8-4 in the month of January, bringing their overall record to 15–28–7, earning 37 points. The team remained in the cellar of the Adams Division, 16 points behind the fourth place Montreal Canadiens.

=== February ===
The Whalers opened February with a 6–6 tie against the Detroit Red Wings, extending their winless streak to 10 games. The Whalers then snapped out of their slump, with three consecutive victories, which was the first time that the club had a winning streak of three games during the season.

The winning streak was snapped on February 11 with a 6–3 loss to the Calgary Flames. On the next day, February 12, the Whalers earned their biggest victory of the season, as they shutout the best team in the NHL, the Edmonton Oilers, 11–0. During the game, Ron Francis and Greg Malone each earned a hat trick. Greg Millen stopped all 28 shots he faced to earn his second shutout of the season.

Following the big win against the Oilers, Hartford lost three of their next four games, with their only win an 8–2 victory over the Toronto Maple Leafs. The Whalers won two of their final three games of February, including a 9–7 win over the Philadelphia Flyers in which the teams combined for nine goals in the first period.

On February 27, the Whalers acquired defenseman Scot Kleinendorst from the New York Rangers in exchange for right winger Blaine Stoughton. Kleinendorst had two assists in 23 games with New York during the season. Also, on the same date, Hartford signed free agent Dave Tippett. Tippett represented Canada at the 1984 Winter Olympics, in which he scored a goal and two points in seven games.

Hartford had a winning record in February with a 7–5–1 record, making it the first time all season they finished above .500 in a month. The Whalers overall record at the end of February was 22–33–8, earning 52 points. The Whalers remained in last place, 11 points behind the Montreal Canadiens for the final playoff berth.

=== March/April ===
Hartford opened March with a tie and a victory over the Boston Bruins in a home-and-home series to try to stay alive in the playoff race. The club then lost their next four games, including a must-win game against the Montreal Canadiens, to fall 14 points out of the final playoff spot by the middle of the month.

With their playoff hopes gone, the Whalers finished the season on a positive note, going 5-5-1 in their final 11 games.

The Whalers finished March/April with a 6–9–2 record, bringing their final overall record to 28–42–10, earning 66 points, and finishing in last place in the Adams Division. Hartford finished nine points behind the Montreal Canadiens for the final playoff position.

=== Final standings ===
Adams Division
	GP	W	L	T	GF	GA	Pts
**Boston Bruins**	80	49	25	6	336	261	104
**Buffalo Sabres**	80	48	25	7	315	257	103
**Quebec Nordiques**	80	42	28	10	360	278	94
**Montreal Canadiens**	80	35	40	5	286	295	75
Hartford Whalers	80	28	42	10	288	320	66

Note: GP = Games played, W = Wins, L = Losses, T = Ties, Pts = Points, GF = Goals for, GA = Goals against
Note: Teams that qualified for the playoffs are highlighted in bold.

=== Record vs. opponents ===
Adams Division record vs. opponents

==== Vs. Wales Conference ====
**Vs. Adams Division**

1983–84 NHL records
Team	**BOS**	**BUF**	**HFD**	**MTL**	**QUE**	**Total**
Boston	—	4–4	5–2–1	6–2	4–4	**19–12–1**
Buffalo	4–4	—	5–3	8–0	1–6–1	**18–13–1**
Hartford	2–5–1	3–5	—	0–7−1	1–3−4	**6–20–6**
Montreal	2–6	0–8	7–0−1	—	3–5	**12–19–1**
Quebec	4–4	6–1–1	3–1−4	5–3	—	**18–9–5**

**Vs. Patrick Division**

1983–84 NHL records
Team	**NJD**	**NYI**	**NYR**	**PHI**	**PIT**	**WSH**	**Total**
Boston	2−1	2−0−1	2−0–1	1−1−1	3−0	2−1	**12−3−3**
Buffalo	2−0−1	0−3	1−1−1	3−0	3−0	2−0−1	**11−4−3**
Hartford	1−1–1	2–1	2–1	2–1	1–2	1−2	**9−8−1**
Montreal	2−1	0−3	2–1	0−2−1	2−0−1	0−3	**6−10−2**
Quebec	2−1	2−1	0−2–1	0−2−1	3−0	2−1	**9−7−2**

==== Vs. Campbell Conference ====
**Vs. Norris Division**

1983–84 NHL records
Team	**CHI**	**DET**	**MIN**	**STL**	**TOR**	**Total**
Boston	1–2	2–1	1–2	3–0	1–2	**8–7–0**
Buffalo	1−2	1−1−1	1−2	2−1	2−0−1	**7−6−2**
Hartford	2–1	1–1−1	3−0	2–1	2–1	**10–4–1**
Montreal	2−0–1	3−0	1–2	3–0	2−1	**11–3–1**
Quebec	1–1−1	1–2	2–0−1	2–0–1	2–1	**8–4–3**

**Vs. Smythe Division**

1983–84 NHL records
Team	**CGY**	**EDM**	**LAK**	**VAN**	**WIN**	**Total**
Boston	2−0−1	1−2	3−0	2−0−1	2−1	**10−3−2**
Buffalo	3−0	1–2	2−0−1	3−0	3−0	**12−2−1**
Hartford	0−2–1	1–2	2–1	0–3	0–2–1	**3–10–2**
Montreal	2−1	1−2	1−2	1–2	1−1−1	**6−8−1**
Quebec	2−1	0−3	3−0	1−2	1−2	**7−8−0**

== Schedule and results ==
1983–84 regular season
October

Game	Result	Date	Score	Opponent	Record	Attendance
1	L	October 5, 1983	3–5	@ Buffalo Sabres (1983–84)	0–1–0	10,707
2	W	October 8, 1983	4–3	Boston Bruins (1983–84)	1–1–0	14,261
3	L	October 9, 1983	1–4	@ Boston Bruins (1983–84)	1–2–0	12,512
4	T	October 13, 1983	4–4 OT	Quebec Nordiques (1983–84)	1–2–1	8,353
5	W	October 15, 1983	6–4	@ Pittsburgh Penguins (1983–84)	2–2–1	6,072
6	W	October 19, 1983	3–0	Washington Capitals (1983–84)	3–2–1	8,415
7	L	October 22, 1983	2–5	Buffalo Sabres (1983–84)	3–3–1	11,465
8	W	October 25, 1983	8–5	@ Los Angeles Kings (1983–84)	4–3–1	8,474
9	L	October 28, 1983	4–5 OT	@ Vancouver Canucks (1983–84)	4–4–1	12,686
10	L	October 30, 1983	1–6	@ Chicago Black Hawks (1983–84)	4–5–1	16,452

November

Game	Result	Date	Score	Opponent	Record	Attendance
11	L	November 1, 1983	2–6	@ Montreal Canadiens (1983–84)	4–6–1	15,598
12	W	November 2, 1983	5–4	New Jersey Devils (1983–84)	5–6–1	6,435
13	W	November 5, 1983	2–1	Los Angeles Kings (1983–84)	6–6–1	11,512
14	L	November 6, 1983	2–4	@ Philadelphia Flyers (1983–84)	6–7–1	15,859
15	W	November 8, 1983	6–4	Minnesota North Stars (1983–84)	7–7–1	9,004
16	W	November 12, 1983	6–1	Chicago Black Hawks (1983–84)	8–7–1	14,817
17	L	November 15, 1983	4–6	@ New York Islanders (1983–84)	8–8–1	15,004
18	L	November 17, 1983	2–4	Quebec Nordiques (1983–84)	8–9–1	10,644
19	T	November 19, 1983	4–4 OT	@ Quebec Nordiques (1983–84)	8–9–2	14,879
20	L	November 23, 1983	3–4	Montreal Canadiens (1983–84)	8–10–2	13,114
21	W	November 26, 1983	4–3 OT	New York Rangers (1983–84)	9–10–2	14,817
22	L	November 30, 1983	2–6	Vancouver Canucks (1983–84)	9–11–2	9,382

December

Game	Result	Date	Score	Opponent	Record	Attendance
23	W	December 3, 1983	7–2	St. Louis Blues (1983–84)	10–11–2	13,197
24	W	December 4, 1983	6–5	@ Philadelphia Flyers (1983–84)	11–11–2	16,033
25	L	December 6, 1983	1–4	@ Montreal Canadiens (1983–84)	11–12–2	15,461
26	L	December 8, 1983	6–8	Toronto Maple Leafs (1983–84)	11–13–2	8,835
27	T	December 10, 1983	5–5 OT	Winnipeg Jets (1983–84)	11–13–3	10,355
28	L	December 13, 1983	2–3	@ Pittsburgh Penguins (1983–84)	11–14–3	4,339
29	L	December 15, 1983	2–4	@ Boston Bruins (1983–84)	11–15–3	12,003
30	L	December 17, 1983	1–4	Buffalo Sabres (1983–84)	11–16–3	11,032
31	L	December 20, 1983	2–7	Boston Bruins (1983–84)	11–17–3	14,817
32	W	December 21, 1983	6–3	@ Buffalo Sabres (1983–84)	12–17–3	11,187
33	W	December 23, 1983	5–3	Minnesota North Stars (1983–84)	13–17–3	9,433
34	L	December 26, 1983	1–2	Montreal Canadiens (1983–84)	13–18–3	13,172
35	L	December 27, 1983	3–7	@ Quebec Nordiques (1983–84)	13–19–3	15,281
36	L	December 30, 1983	3–9	Los Angeles Kings (1983–84)	13–20–3	11,006

January

Game	Result	Date	Score	Opponent	Record	Attendance
37	L	January 3, 1984	1–7	@ Detroit Red Wings (1983–84)	13–21–3	13,113
38	W	January 5, 1984	4–2	New York Islanders (1983–84)	14–21–3	13,001
39	L	January 7, 1984	3–5	@ Edmonton Oilers (1983–84)	14–22–3	17,498
40	L	January 8, 1984	3–4	@ Winnipeg Jets (1983–84)	14–23–3	11,037
41	W	January 10, 1984	6–3	@ Minnesota North Stars (1983–84)	15–23–3	13,239
42	T	January 13, 1984	3–3 OT	@ Calgary Flames (1983–84)	15–23–4	16,764
43	L	January 15, 1984	0–5	@ Vancouver Canucks (1983–84)	15–24–4	12,235
44	T	January 17, 1984	3–3 OT	New Jersey Devils (1983–84)	15–24–5	8,994
45	L	January 19, 1984	2–3	Montreal Canadiens (1983–84)	15–25–5	11,415
46	L	January 21, 1984	0–2	Boston Bruins (1983–84)	15–26–5	14,817
47	T	January 24, 1984	7–7 OT	@ Montreal Canadiens (1983–84)	15–26–6	15,548
48	L	January 26, 1984	2–6	Winnipeg Jets (1983–84)	15–27–6	9,651
49	L	January 28, 1984	0–3	@ Quebec Nordiques (1983–84)	15–28–6	15,074
50	T	January 29, 1984	5–5 OT	Quebec Nordiques (1983–84)	15–28–7	10,067

February

Game	Result	Date	Score	Opponent	Record	Attendance
51	T	February 1, 1984	6–6 OT	@ Detroit Red Wings (1983–84)	15–28–8	14,616
52	W	February 4, 1984	7–3	@ St. Louis Blues (1983–84)	16–28–8	13,825
53	W	February 5, 1984	4–3	@ Chicago Black Hawks (1983–84)	17–28–8	16,808
54	W	February 7, 1984	4–1	Detroit Red Wings (1983–84)	18–28–8	10,809
55	L	February 11, 1984	3–6	Calgary Flames (1983–84)	18–29–8	11,629
56	W	February 12, 1984	11–0	Edmonton Oilers (1983–84)	19–29–8	14,817
57	L	February 14, 1984	3–5	Montreal Canadiens (1983–84)	19–30–8	9,722
58	L	February 16, 1984	5–6 OT	@ New Jersey Devils (1983–84)	19–31–8	8,597
59	W	February 18, 1984	8–2	@ Toronto Maple Leafs (1983–84)	20–31–8	16,382
60	L	February 19, 1984	2–5	@ Buffalo Sabres (1983–84)	20–32–8	15,578
61	W	February 23, 1984	3–2	Buffalo Sabres (1983–84)	21–32–8	11,325
62	W	February 25, 1984	9–7	Philadelphia Flyers (1983–84)	22–32–8	11,928
63	L	February 26, 1984	3–4	Washington Capitals (1983–84)	22–33–8	11,036

March

Game	Result	Date	Score	Opponent	Record	Attendance
64	T	March 3, 1984	3–3 OT	@ Boston Bruins (1983–84)	22–33–9	14,167
65	W	March 4, 1984	6–4	Boston Bruins (1983–84)	23–33–9	14,817
66	L	March 7, 1984	2–4	@ Washington Capitals (1983–84)	23–34–9	10,875
67	L	March 8, 1984	2–3	@ Montreal Canadiens (1983–84)	23–35–9	16,636
68	L	March 11, 1984	3–4 OT	@ Buffalo Sabres (1983–84)	23–36–9	16,433
69	L	March 13, 1984	0–2	@ St. Louis Blues (1983–84)	23–37–9	10,567
70	W	March 15, 1984	5–3	Toronto Maple Leafs (1983–84)	24–37–9	11,010
71	L	March 17, 1984	2–4	Pittsburgh Penguins (1983–84)	24–38–9	10,494
72	W	March 18, 1984	5–4	New York Islanders (1983–84)	25–38–9	10,875
73	L	March 20, 1984	1–4	@ Calgary Flames (1983–84)	25–39–9	16,764
74	L	March 21, 1984	3–5	@ Edmonton Oilers (1983–84)	25–40–9	17,498
75	W	March 24, 1984	3–2 OT	@ Quebec Nordiques (1983–84)	26–40–9	15,346
76	T	March 25, 1984	6–6 OT	Quebec Nordiques (1983–84)	26–40–10	10,058
77	W	March 27, 1984	4–1	Buffalo Sabres (1983–84)	27–40–10	12,930
78	L	March 29, 1984	3–4	@ Boston Bruins (1983–84)	27–41–10	4,761
79	W	March 31, 1984	5–3	New York Rangers (1983–84)	28–41–10	14,817

April

Game	Result	Date	Score	Opponent	Record	Attendance
80	L	April 1, 1984	0–2	@ New York Rangers (1983–84)	28–42–10	17,400

Legend: Win (2 points) Loss (0 points) Tie (1 point)

== Transactions ==
The Whalers were involved in the following transactions during the 1983–84 season.

=== Trades ===
June 24, 1983	To Winnipeg Jets 4th round pick in 1984 – Chris Mills	To Hartford Whalers Norm Dupont
July 5, 1983	To Calgary Flames Mickey Volcan	To Hartford Whalers Richie Dunn; Joel Quenneville
August 19, 1983	To New York Islanders 5th round pick in 1985 – Tommy Hedlund	To Hartford Whalers Steve Stoyanovich
September 9, 1983	To Philadelphia Flyers Future Considerations	To Hartford Whalers Tom Gorence
September 29, 1983	To Boston Bruins Future Considerations	To Hartford Whalers Marty Howe
September 30, 1983	To Pittsburgh Penguins 3rd round pick in 1985 – Bruce Racine	To Hartford Whalers Greg Malone
October 3, 1983	To Washington Capitals Greg Adams	To Hartford Whalers Torrie Robertson
November 10, 1983	To Winnipeg Jets Mike Veisor	To Hartford Whalers Ed Staniowski
February 27, 1984	To New York Rangers Blaine Stoughton	To Hartford Whalers Scot Kleinendorst

=== Waivers ===
October 3, 1983	To Buffalo Sabres Mark Renaud
October 3, 1983	From St. Louis Blues Bob Crawford
October 3, 1983	From St. Louis Blues Mike Crombeen
October 3, 1983	From St. Louis Blues Mike Zuke
March 2, 1984	From St. Louis Blues Jack Brownschidle

=== Free agents ===
Player	Former team
Randy Pierce	New Jersey Devils
Reid Bailey	Toronto Maple Leafs
Tony Currie	Vancouver Canucks
Dave Tippett	Team Canada (Olympics)

== Draft picks ==
Hartford's draft picks at the 1983 NHL entry draft held at the Montreal Forum in Montreal.

Round	#	Player	Nationality	College/Junior/Club team (League)
1	2	Sylvain Turgeon	Canada	Hull Olympiques (QMJHL)
1	20	David Jensen	United States	Lawrence Academy (USHS-MA)
2	23	Ville Siren	Finland	Tampere Ilves (Finland)
3	61	Leif Carlsson	Sweden	Mora IK (Sweden)
4	64	Dave MacLean	Canada	Belleville Bulls (OHL)
4	72	Ron Chyzowski	Canada	St. Albert Saints (AJHL)
6	104	Brian Johnson	United States	Silver Bay High School (USHS-MN)
7	124	Joe Reekie	Canada	North Bay Centennials (OHL)
8	143	Christian Duperron	Canada	Chicoutimi Saguenéens (QMJHL)
8	144	Jamie Falle	Canada	Clarkson University (ECAC)
9	164	Bill Fordy	Canada	Guelph Platers (OHL)
10	193	Reine Landgren	Sweden	Sodertalje (Sweden)
11	204	Allan Acton	Canada	Saskatoon Blazers (WHL)
12	224	Darcy Kaminski	Canada	Lethbridge Broncos (WHL)

== See also ==
- 1983–84 NHL season
