= 1983–84 St. Louis Blues season =

National Hockey League team season

1983–84 St. Louis Blues
- Division: 2nd Norris
- Conference: 6th Campbell
- 1983–84 record: 32–41–7
- Home record: 23–14–3
- Road record: 9–27–4
- Goals for: 293
- Goals against: 316

Team information
- General manager: Ron Caron
- Coach: Jacques Demers
- Captain: Brian Sutter
- Alternate captains: None
- Arena: St. Louis Arena

Team leaders
- Goals: Bernie Federko; Joe Mullen (41)
- Assists: Bernie Federko (66)
- Points: Bernie Federko (107)
- Penalty minutes: Dwight Schofield (219)
- Wins: Mike Liut (25)
- Goals against average: Mike Liut (3.45)

The 1983–84 St. Louis Blues season was the 17th in franchise history. It involved the team finishing with a 32-41-7 record, good for 71 points, while placing second place in the Norris Division. It was also the season that The Checkerdome was renamed as The Arena, going back to its original name.

== Offseason ==
The Blues did not participate in the 1983 NHL entry draft, shortly after the league blocked the franchise's relocation to Saskatoon, Saskatchewan.

== Regular season ==
=== Final standings ===
Norris Division
	GP	W	L	T	GF	GA	Pts
**Minnesota North Stars**	80	39	31	10	345	344	88
**St. Louis Blues**	80	32	41	7	293	316	71
**Detroit Red Wings**	80	31	42	7	298	323	69
**Chicago Black Hawks**	80	30	42	8	277	311	68
Toronto Maple Leafs	80	26	45	9	303	387	61

Note: GP = Games played, W = Wins, L = Losses, T = Ties, Pts = Points, GF = Goals for, GA = Goals against
Note: Teams that qualified for the playoffs are highlighted in bold.

=== Record vs. opponents ===
Norris Division record vs. opponents

==== Vs. Campbell Conference ====
**Vs. Norris Division**

1983–84 NHL records
Team	**CHI**	**DET**	**MIN**	**STL**	**TOR**	**Total**
Chicago	—	4−4	2−6	4−3−1	5−2−1	**15−15−2**
Detroit	4−4	—	2−6	5−3	3−5	**14−18−0**
Minnesota	6−2	6−2	—	5−2−1	5−2−1	**22−8−2**
St. Louis	3−4−1	3−5	2−5−1	—	6−2	**14−16−2**
Toronto	2−5−1	5−3	2−5−1	2−6	—	**11−19−2**

**Vs. Smythe Division**

1983–84 NHL records
Team	**CGY**	**EDM**	**LAK**	**VAN**	**WIN**	**Total**
Chicago	1−2	1−2	0−3	2−1	1−2	**5−10−0**
Detroit	2−1	0−3	0−2−1	1−2	1−0−2	**4−8−3**
Minnesota	1−2	0−2−1	1−1−1	1−1−1	2−1	**5−7−3**
St. Louis	0−2−1	2−1	1−1−1	2−1	1−2	**6−7−2**
Toronto	0−1−2	1−2	2−0−1	0−1−2	0−3	**3−7−5**

==== Vs. Wales Conference ====
**Vs. Adams Division**

1983–84 NHL records
Team	**BOS**	**BUF**	**HFD**	**MTL**	**QUE**	**Total**
Chicago	2−1	2−1	1−2	0−2−1	1−1−1	**6−7−2**
Detroit	1−2	1−1−1	1−1−1	0−3	2−1	**5−8−2**
Minnesota	2−1	2−1	0−3	2−1	0−2−1	**6−8−1**
St. Louis	0−3	1−2	1−2	0−3	0−2−1	**2−12−1**
Toronto	2−1	0−2−1	1−2	1−2	1−2	**5−9−1**

**Vs. Patrick Division**

1983–84 NHL records
Team	**NJD**	**NYI**	**NYR**	**PHI**	**PIT**	**WSH**	**Total**
Chicago	1−2	0−3	1−2	0−1−2	1−1−1	1−1−1	**4−10−4**
Detroit	1−2	2−1	0−3	0−1−2	3−0	2−1	**8−8−2**
Minnesota	2−1	0−2−1	1−1−1	1−0−2	2−1	0−3	**6−8−4**
St. Louis	3−0	1−1−1	1−2	2−1	2−0−1	1−2	**10−6−2**
Toronto	3−0	1−2	2−1	0−3	1−1−1	0−3	**7−10−1**

== Schedule and results ==
1983–84 regular season
October

Game	Result	Date	Score	Opponent	Record
1	W	October 4, 1983	5–3	Pittsburgh Penguins (1983–84)	1–0–0
2	L	October 5, 1983	3–4	@ Chicago Black Hawks (1983–84)	1–1–0
3	W	October 8, 1983	4–1	Chicago Black Hawks (1983–84)	2–1–0
4	W	October 11, 1983	3–2	Vancouver Canucks (1983–84)	3–1–0
5	W	October 13, 1983	7–4	Los Angeles Kings (1983–84)	4–1–0
6	W	October 15, 1983	6–5	New York Rangers (1983–84)	5–1–0
7	L	October 19, 1983	2–4	@ Detroit Red Wings (1983–84)	5–2–0
8	W	October 22, 1983	2–1	Chicago Black Hawks (1983–84)	6–2–0
9	L	October 25, 1983	1–7	@ Vancouver Canucks (1983–84)	6–3–0
10	L	October 26, 1983	4–5	@ Calgary Flames (1983–84)	6–4–0
11	L	October 29, 1983	2–3	Boston Bruins (1983–84)	6–5–0

November

Game	Result	Date	Score	Opponent	Record
12	L	November 1, 1983	2–3	Detroit Red Wings (1983–84)	6–6–0
13	L	November 3, 1983	5–9	@ Boston Bruins (1983–84)	6–7–0
14	W	November 5, 1983	7–6	Philadelphia Flyers (1983–84)	7–7–0
15	T	November 8, 1983	5–5 OT	@ Los Angeles Kings (1983–84)	7–7–1
16	L	November 10, 1983	2–6	@ Los Angeles Kings (1983–84)	7–8–1
17	L	November 12, 1983	2–5	@ Minnesota North Stars (1983–84)	7–9–1
18	L	November 15, 1983	2–5	Montreal Canadiens (1983–84)	7–10–1
19	L	November 16, 1983	3–4	@ Chicago Black Hawks (1983–84)	7–11–1
20	T	November 19, 1983	4–4 OT	@ Pittsburgh Penguins (1983–84)	7–11–2
21	W	November 22, 1983	7–4	Toronto Maple Leafs (1983–84)	8–11–2
22	L	November 23, 1983	0–3	@ Detroit Red Wings (1983–84)	8–12–2
23	W	November 26, 1983	8–6	Edmonton Oilers (1983–84)	9–12–2
24	T	November 29, 1983	5–5 OT	New York Islanders (1983–84)	9–12–3

December

Game	Result	Date	Score	Opponent	Record
25	L	December 2, 1983	6–7	@ Buffalo Sabres (1983–84)	9–13–3
26	L	December 3, 1983	2–7	@ Hartford Whalers (1983–84)	9–14–3
27	W	December 6, 1983	8–2	Buffalo Sabres (1983–84)	10–14–3
28	W	December 7, 1983	4–3	@ Toronto Maple Leafs (1983–84)	11–14–3
29	W	December 10, 1983	8–3	Detroit Red Wings (1983–84)	12–14–3
30	W	December 13, 1983	4–1	Chicago Black Hawks (1983–84)	13–14–3
31	T	December 14, 1983	4–4 OT	@ Minnesota North Stars (1983–84)	13–14–4
32	L	December 17, 1983	3–6	@ Montreal Canadiens (1983–84)	13–15–4
33	L	December 20, 1983	2–5	Minnesota North Stars (1983–84)	13–16–4
34	L	December 21, 1983	4–5	@ Toronto Maple Leafs (1983–84)	13–17–4
35	L	December 23, 1983	3–6	@ Winnipeg Jets (1983–84)	13–18–4
36	L	December 26, 1983	1–3	@ Chicago Black Hawks (1983–84)	13–19–4
37	W	December 27, 1983	5–4 OT	@ New Jersey Devils (1983–84)	14–19–4
38	W	December 29, 1983	3–1	Toronto Maple Leafs (1983–84)	15–19–4
39	W	December 31, 1983	2–0	Pittsburgh Penguins (1983–84)	16–19–4

January

Game	Result	Date	Score	Opponent	Record
40	W	January 3, 1984	8–3	Toronto Maple Leafs (1983–84)	17–19–4
41	L	January 5, 1984	1–5	@ Washington Capitals (1983–84)	17–20–4
42	L	January 7, 1984	0–5	@ Montreal Canadiens (1983–84)	17–21–4
43	W	January 8, 1984	5–2	@ Toronto Maple Leafs (1983–84)	18–21–4
44	W	January 10, 1984	2–0	Vancouver Canucks (1983–84)	19–21–4
45	L	January 12, 1984	2–6	Boston Bruins (1983–84)	19–22–4
46	L	January 14, 1984	2–4	Minnesota North Stars (1983–84)	19–23–4
47	T	January 17, 1984	2–2 OT	Calgary Flames (1983–84)	19–23–5
48	L	January 18, 1984	2–6	@ New York Rangers (1983–84)	19–24–5
49	W	January 20, 1984	4–3 OT	@ New Jersey Devils (1983–84)	20–24–5
50	L	January 21, 1984	1–2	Buffalo Sabres (1983–84)	20–25–5
51	W	January 24, 1984	6–3	Toronto Maple Leafs (1983–84)	21–25–5
52	L	January 27, 1984	8–10	Minnesota North Stars (1983–84)	21–26–5
53	L	January 29, 1984	2–3	@ New York Rangers (1983–84)	21–27–5

February

Game	Result	Date	Score	Opponent	Record
54	W	February 2, 1984	5–2	@ New York Islanders (1983–84)	22–27–5
55	L	February 4, 1984	3–7	Hartford Whalers (1983–84)	22–28–5
56	L	February 7, 1984	1–2	Calgary Flames (1983–84)	22–29–5
57	T	February 11, 1984	1–1 OT	Chicago Black Hawks (1983–84)	22–29–6
58	W	February 15, 1984	4–3	@ Detroit Red Wings (1983–84)	23–29–6
59	L	February 16, 1984	2–5	@ Philadelphia Flyers (1983–84)	23–30–6
60	L	February 18, 1984	2–4	Washington Capitals (1983–84)	23–31–6
61	L	February 19, 1984	5–6	@ Chicago Black Hawks (1983–84)	23–32–6
62	L	February 21, 1984	5–6	Edmonton Oilers (1983–84)	23–33–6
63	L	February 23, 1984	1–5	@ New York Islanders (1983–84)	23–34–6
64	T	February 25, 1984	3–3 OT	@ Quebec Nordiques (1983–84)	23–34–7
65	L	February 26, 1984	0–5	@ Quebec Nordiques (1983–84)	23–35–7
66	W	February 28, 1984	5–2	Minnesota North Stars (1983–84)	24–35–7
67	W	February 29, 1984	7–5	@ Minnesota North Stars (1983–84)	25–35–7

March

Game	Result	Date	Score	Opponent	Record
68	W	March 3, 1984	4–3	Philadelphia Flyers (1983–84)	26–35–7
69	L	March 6, 1984	1–3	Detroit Red Wings (1983–84)	26–36–7
70	L	March 8, 1984	3–6	@ Detroit Red Wings (1983–84)	26–37–7
71	W	March 10, 1984	6–5 OT	New Jersey Devils (1983–84)	27–37–7
72	W	March 13, 1984	2–0	Hartford Whalers (1983–84)	28–37–7
73	W	March 15, 1984	5–3	Detroit Red Wings (1983–84)	29–37–7
74	L	March 17, 1984	4–6	Quebec Nordiques (1983–84)	29–38–7
75	W	March 18, 1984	5–3	@ Washington Capitals (1983–84)	30–38–7
76	W	March 20, 1984	9–3	Winnipeg Jets (1983–84)	31–38–7
77	W	March 24, 1984	7–1	@ Edmonton Oilers (1983–84)	32–38–7
78	L	March 26, 1984	3–4 OT	@ Minnesota North Stars (1983–84)	32–39–7
79	L	March 30, 1984	1–2	@ Winnipeg Jets (1983–84)	32–40–7
80	L	March 31, 1984	4–6	@ Toronto Maple Leafs (1983–84)	32–41–7

Legend: Win (2 points) Loss (0 points) Tie (1 point)

== Playoffs ==
The Blues qualified for the 1984 Stanley Cup playoffs as the second-place finisher in the Norris Division with 71 points. In the Norris Division Semi-Finals, St. Louis faced the third-place Detroit Red Wings in a best-of-five series. The Blues won Game 1 at home on April 4, 1984 by a score of 3–2, then dropped Game 2 on April 5 by a score of 3–5. The series shifted to Detroit, where the Blues claimed Game 3 on April 7 in double overtime by a score of 4–3, and then won the series on April 8 with a 3–2 overtime victory. St. Louis advanced with a 3–1 series victory.

In the Norris Division Finals, the Blues met the first-place Minnesota North Stars in a best-of-seven series. Minnesota took a 1–0 series lead with a 2–1 victory on April 12. St. Louis tied the series with a 4–3 overtime win on April 13. The Blues then took a 2–1 series lead with a 3–1 home win on April 15 before Minnesota evened the series at 2–2 on April 16 with a 3–2 win. Minnesota regained the lead with a dominant 6–0 victory on April 18, but St. Louis forced a seventh game with a 4–0 shutout win on April 20. In Game 7 on April 22, Minnesota eliminated St. Louis with a 4–3 overtime victory, winning the series four games to three.

== Player statistics ==
=== Regular season ===
Scoring

Player	Pos	GP	G	A	Pts	PIM	+/-	PPG	SHG	GWG
Bernie Federko	C	79	41	66	107	43	-3	14	0	4
Joe Mullen	RW	80	41	44	85	19	-8	13	0	6
Brian Sutter	LW	76	32	51	83	162	-6	14	2	3
Jorgen Pettersson	LW	77	28	34	62	29	-2	7	0	7
Rob Ramage	D	80	15	45	60	121	-11	9	0	3
Doug Gilmour	C	80	25	28	53	57	6	3	1	1
Guy Chouinard	C	64	12	34	46	10	-15	4	0	2
Wayne Babych	RW	70	13	29	42	52	1	3	0	0
Doug Wickenheiser	C	46	7	21	28	19	10	2	0	1
Mark Reeds	RW	65	11	14	25	23	-3	3	1	0
Perry Turnbull	C	32	14	8	22	81	-2	1	0	0
Pat Hickey	LW	69	9	11	20	24	-3	0	0	1
Rik Wilson	D	48	7	11	18	53	4	2	0	1
Andre Dore	D	55	3	12	15	58	3	0	0	1
Tim Bothwell	D	62	2	13	15	65	22	1	0	0
Greg Paslawski	RW	34	8	6	14	17	4	1	0	0
Jack Carlson	LW	58	6	8	14	95	9	0	0	0
Dwight Schofield	D	70	4	10	14	219	-3	0	0	1
Perry Anderson	LW	50	7	5	12	195	-13	0	0	1
Blake Dunlop	C	17	1	10	11	4	-1	0	0	0
Dave Pichette	D	23	0	11	11	6	-5	0	0	0
Alain Lemieux	C	17	4	5	9	6	0	1	0	0
Terry Johnson	D	65	2	6	8	143	5	0	0	0
Jack Brownschidle	D	51	1	7	8	19	-21	1	0	0
Gilbert Delorme	D	44	0	5	5	41	-7	0	0	0
Mike Liut	G	58	0	4	4	0	0	0	0	0
Larry Patey	C	17	0	1	1	8	-12	0	0	0
Jim Pavese	D	4	0	1	1	19	-1	0	0	0
Dave Barr	RW	1	0	0	0	0	-1	0	0	0
Perry Ganchar	RW	1	0	0	0	0	1	0	0	0
Rick Heinz	G	22	0	0	0	4	0	0	0	0
Ralph Klassen	C	5	0	0	0	0	-5	0	0	0
Michel Larocque	G	5	0	0	0	2	0	0	0	0
John Markell	LW	2	0	0	0	0	-4	0	0	0

Goaltending

Player	MIN	GP	W	L	T	GA	GAA	SO
Mike Liut	3425	58	25	29	4	197	3.45	3
Rick Heinz	1118	22	7	7	3	80	4.29	0
Michel Larocque	300	5	0	5	0	31	6.20	0
Team:	4843	80	32	41	7	308	3.82	3

=== Playoffs ===
Scoring

Player	Pos	GP	G	A	Pts	PIM	PPG	SHG	GWG
Doug Gilmour	C	11	2	9	11	10	1	0	1
Jorgen Pettersson	LW	11	7	3	10	2	2	0	1
Rob Ramage	D	11	1	8	9	32	1	0	1
Bernie Federko	C	11	4	4	8	10	1	0	1
Mark Reeds	RW	11	3	3	6	15	0	1	1
Brian Sutter	LW	11	1	5	6	22	1	0	0
Wayne Babych	RW	10	1	4	5	4	0	0	0
Perry Ganchar	RW	7	3	1	4	0	2	0	0
Doug Wickenheiser	C	11	2	2	4	2	0	1	1
Gilbert Delorme	D	11	1	3	4	11	0	0	0
Dave Pichette	D	9	1	2	3	18	0	0	0
Joe Mullen	RW	6	2	0	2	0	0	0	0
Pat Hickey	LW	11	1	1	2	6	0	1	0
Tim Bothwell	D	11	0	2	2	14	0	0	0
Guy Chouinard	C	5	0	2	2	0	0	0	0
Greg Paslawski	RW	9	1	0	1	2	0	0	0
Terry Johnson	D	11	0	1	1	25	0	0	0
Perry Anderson	LW	9	0	0	0	27	0	0	0
Jack Carlson	LW	5	0	0	0	2	0	0	0
Rick Heinz	G	1	0	0	0	0	0	0	0
Mike Liut	G	11	0	0	0	0	0	0	0
Dwight Schofield	D	4	0	0	0	26	0	0	0
Rik Wilson	D	11	0	0	0	9	0	0	0

Goaltending

Player	MIN	GP	W	L	GA	GAA	SO
Mike Liut	714	11	6	5	29	2.44	1
Rick Heinz	8	1	0	0	1	7.50	0
Team:	722	11	6	5	30	2.49	1

Note:

Pos = Position;GP = Games played; G = Goals; A = Assists; Pts = Points; PIM = Penalty minutes; +/- = Plus/minus; PPG = Power-play goals; SHG = Short-handed goals; GWG = Game-winning goals
Pos = Position;GP = Games played; Min, TOI = Minutes played; W = Wins; L = Losses; T,T/OT = Ties; OTL = Overtime losses; GA = Goals-against; GAA = Goals-against average; SO = Shutouts; SA = Shots against; SV = Shots saved;SV% = Save percentage;

== See also ==
- 1983–84 NHL season
