= 1983–84 Boston Bruins season =

NHL team season

1983–84 Boston Bruins
- Adams Division champions
- Division: 1st Adams
- Conference: 2nd Wales
- 1983–84 record: 49–25–6
- Home record: 25–12–3
- Road record: 24–13–3
- Goals for: 336
- Goals against: 261

Team information
- General manager: Harry Sinden
- Coach: Gerry Cheevers
- Captain: Terry O'Reilly
- Alternate captains: None
- Arena: Boston Garden

Team leaders
- Goals: Rick Middleton (47)
- Assists: Barry Pederson (77)
- Points: Barry Pederson (116)
- Penalty minutes: Mike Milbury (159)
- Plus/minus: Ray Bourque (51)
- Wins: Pete Peeters (41)
- Goals against average: Pete Peeters (3.16)

The 1983–84 Boston Bruins season was the Bruins' 60th season

== Regular season ==
=== Final standings ===
Adams Division
	GP	W	L	T	GF	GA	Pts
**Boston Bruins**	80	49	25	6	336	261	104
**Buffalo Sabres**	80	48	25	7	315	257	103
**Quebec Nordiques**	80	42	28	10	360	278	94
**Montreal Canadiens**	80	35	40	5	286	295	75
Hartford Whalers	80	28	42	10	288	320	66

Note: GP = Games played, W = Wins, L = Losses, T = Ties, Pts = Points, GF = Goals for, GA = Goals against
Note: Teams that qualified for the playoffs are highlighted in bold.

=== Record vs. opponents ===
Adams Division record vs. opponents

==== Vs. Wales Conference ====
**Vs. Adams Division**

1983–84 NHL records
Team	**BOS**	**BUF**	**HFD**	**MTL**	**QUE**	**Total**
Boston	—	4–4	5–2–1	6–2	4–4	**19–12–1**
Buffalo	4–4	—	5–3	8–0	1–6–1	**18–13–1**
Hartford	2–5–1	3–5	—	0–7−1	1–3−4	**6–20–6**
Montreal	2–6	0–8	7–0−1	—	3–5	**12–19–1**
Quebec	4–4	6–1–1	3–1−4	5–3	—	**18–9–5**

**Vs. Patrick Division**

1983–84 NHL records
Team	**NJD**	**NYI**	**NYR**	**PHI**	**PIT**	**WSH**	**Total**
Boston	2−1	2−0−1	2−0–1	1−1−1	3−0	2−1	**12−3−3**
Buffalo	2−0−1	0−3	1−1−1	3−0	3−0	2−0−1	**11−4−3**
Hartford	1−1–1	2–1	2–1	2–1	1–2	1−2	**9−8−1**
Montreal	2−1	0−3	2–1	0−2−1	2−0−1	0−3	**6−10−2**
Quebec	2−1	2−1	0−2–1	0−2−1	3−0	2−1	**9−7−2**

==== Vs. Campbell Conference ====
**Vs. Norris Division**

1983–84 NHL records
Team	**CHI**	**DET**	**MIN**	**STL**	**TOR**	**Total**
Boston	1–2	2–1	1–2	3–0	1–2	**8–7–0**
Buffalo	1−2	1−1−1	1−2	2−1	2−0−1	**7−6−2**
Hartford	2–1	1–1−1	3−0	2–1	2–1	**10–4–1**
Montreal	2−0–1	3−0	1–2	3–0	2−1	**11–3–1**
Quebec	1–1−1	1–2	2–0−1	2–0–1	2–1	**8–4–3**

**Vs. Smythe Division**

1983–84 NHL records
Team	**CGY**	**EDM**	**LAK**	**VAN**	**WIN**	**Total**
Boston	2−0−1	1−2	3−0	2−0−1	2−1	**10−3−2**
Buffalo	3−0	1–2	2−0−1	3−0	3−0	**12−2−1**
Hartford	0−2–1	1–2	2–1	0–3	0–2–1	**3–10–2**
Montreal	2−1	1−2	1−2	1–2	1−1−1	**6−8−1**
Quebec	2−1	0−3	3−0	1−2	1−2	**7−8−0**

== Schedule and results ==
1983–84 regular season
October

Game	Result	Date	Score	Opponent	Record
1	W	October 6, 1983	9–3	Quebec Nordiques (1983–84)	1–0–0
2	L	October 8, 1983	3–4	@ Hartford Whalers (1983–84)	1–1–0
3	W	October 9, 1983	4–1	Hartford Whalers (1983–84)	2–1–0
4	W	October 13, 1983	4–2	Montreal Canadiens (1983–84)	3–1–0
5	W	October 15, 1983	5–3	Buffalo Sabres (1983–84)	4–1–0
6	L	October 18, 1983	3–5	@ Quebec Nordiques (1983–84)	4–2–0
7	T	October 20, 1983	3–3 OT	@ Philadelphia Flyers (1983–84)	4–2–1
8	W	October 22, 1983	6–1	@ Pittsburgh Penguins (1983–84)	5–2–1
9	L	October 25, 1983	1–5	@ Chicago Black Hawks (1983–84)	5–3–1
10	W	October 27, 1983	8–1	@ Minnesota North Stars (1983–84)	6–3–1
11	W	October 29, 1983	3–2	@ St. Louis Blues (1983–84)	7–3–1

November

Game	Result	Date	Score	Opponent	Record
12	W	November 3, 1983	9–5	St. Louis Blues (1983–84)	8–3–1
13	W	November 5, 1983	10–4	@ Montreal Canadiens (1983–84)	9–3–1
14	W	November 6, 1983	7–3	Los Angeles Kings (1983–84)	10–3–1
15	L	November 9, 1983	1–3	@ Buffalo Sabres (1983–84)	10–4–1
16	W	November 12, 1983	6–4	@ Quebec Nordiques (1983–84)	11–4–1
17	W	November 13, 1983	4–2	Washington Capitals (1983–84)	12–4–1
18	W	November 17, 1983	4–1	Toronto Maple Leafs (1983–84)	13–4–1
19	T	November 19, 1983	6–6 OT	New York Rangers (1983–84)	13–4–2
20	L	November 22, 1983	2–4	@ Montreal Canadiens (1983–84)	13–5–2
21	L	November 24, 1983	3–6	Quebec Nordiques (1983–84)	13–6–2
22	W	November 26, 1983	6–2	New Jersey Devils (1983–84)	14–6–2

December

Game	Result	Date	Score	Opponent	Record
23	W	December 1, 1983	7–1	Vancouver Canucks (1983–84)	15–6–2
24	L	December 3, 1983	2–6	Minnesota North Stars (1983–84)	15–7–2
25	W	December 4, 1983	4–1	@ Washington Capitals (1983–84)	16–7–2
26	W	December 6, 1983	5–3	@ Pittsburgh Penguins (1983–84)	17–7–2
27	W	December 8, 1983	6–2	Montreal Canadiens (1983–84)	18–7–2
28	L	December 10, 1983	2–4	Buffalo Sabres (1983–84)	18–8–2
29	W	December 11, 1983	4–2	Winnipeg Jets (1983–84)	19–8–2
30	W	December 15, 1983	4–2	Hartford Whalers (1983–84)	20–8–2
31	L	December 17, 1983	2–5	Chicago Black Hawks (1983–84)	20–9–2
32	W	December 18, 1983	5–1	@ Chicago Black Hawks (1983–84)	21–9–2
33	W	December 20, 1983	7–2	@ Hartford Whalers (1983–84)	22–9–2
34	L	December 22, 1983	2–4	Minnesota North Stars (1983–84)	22–10–2
35	W	December 26, 1983	2–1	@ Buffalo Sabres (1983–84)	23–10–2
36	W	December 28, 1983	5–3	@ Calgary Flames (1983–84)	24–10–2
37	L	December 30, 1983	0–2	@ Edmonton Oilers (1983–84)	24–11–2
38	T	December 31, 1983	5–5 OT	@ Vancouver Canucks (1983–84)	24–11–3

January

Game	Result	Date	Score	Opponent	Record
39	W	January 3, 1984	4–2	@ New York Islanders (1983–84)	25–11–3
40	L	January 5, 1984	3–8	Quebec Nordiques (1983–84)	25–12–3
41	W	January 7, 1984	5–2	New York Rangers (1983–84)	26–12–3
42	W	January 11, 1984	7–2	@ Detroit Red Wings (1983–84)	27–12–3
43	W	January 12, 1984	6–2	@ St. Louis Blues (1983–84)	28–12–3
44	W	January 14, 1984	7–3	Pittsburgh Penguins (1983–84)	29–12–3
45	W	January 16, 1984	2–0	New York Islanders (1983–84)	30–12–3
46	L	January 17, 1984	3–7	@ Quebec Nordiques (1983–84)	30–13–3
47	W	January 19, 1984	4–3	Quebec Nordiques (1983–84)	31–13–3
48	W	January 21, 1984	2–0	@ Hartford Whalers (1983–84)	32–13–3
49	L	January 23, 1984	3–5	Buffalo Sabres (1983–84)	32–14–3
50	W	January 28, 1984	5–2	Winnipeg Jets (1983–84)	33–14–3
51	L	January 29, 1984	2–7	Montreal Canadiens (1983–84)	33–15–3

February

Game	Result	Date	Score	Opponent	Record
52	W	February 2, 1984	5–3	Buffalo Sabres (1983–84)	34–15–3
53	W	February 4, 1984	8–5	Philadelphia Flyers (1983–84)	35–15–3
54	L	February 5, 1984	5–6	Detroit Red Wings (1983–84)	35–16–3
55	L	February 8, 1984	4–6	@ Toronto Maple Leafs (1983–84)	35–17–3
56	L	February 9, 1984	3–6	Toronto Maple Leafs (1983–84)	35–18–3
57	W	February 11, 1984	4–1	Edmonton Oilers (1983–84)	36–18–3
58	L	February 15, 1984	4–7	@ Buffalo Sabres (1983–84)	36–19–3
59	L	February 17, 1984	2–5	@ Edmonton Oilers (1983–84)	36–20–3
60	T	February 18, 1984	5–5 OT	@ Calgary Flames (1983–84)	36–20–4
61	W	February 21, 1984	5–2	@ Vancouver Canucks (1983–84)	37–20–4
62	W	February 22, 1984	6–3	@ Los Angeles Kings (1983–84)	38–20–4
63	L	February 25, 1984	2–5	@ Winnipeg Jets (1983–84)	38–21–4
64	W	February 27, 1984	3–1	@ Buffalo Sabres (1983–84)	39–21–4

March

Game	Result	Date	Score	Opponent	Record
65	W	March 1, 1984	4–3 OT	Los Angeles Kings (1983–84)	40–21–4
66	T	March 3, 1984	3–3 OT	Hartford Whalers (1983–84)	40–21–5
67	L	March 4, 1984	4–6	@ Hartford Whalers (1983–84)	40–22–5
68	W	March 8, 1984	3–2	Calgary Flames (1983–84)	41–22–5
69	W	March 10, 1984	4–2	@ Montreal Canadiens (1983–84)	42–22–5
70	L	March 11, 1984	1–2	Washington Capitals (1983–84)	42–23–5
71	W	March 14, 1984	4–2	@ Detroit Red Wings (1983–84)	43–23–5
72	L	March 15, 1984	3–6	@ Philadelphia Flyers (1983–84)	43–24–5
73	L	March 17, 1984	3–5	New Jersey Devils (1983–84)	43–25–5
74	W	March 20, 1984	6–4	@ New York Rangers (1983–84)	44–25–5
75	T	March 22, 1984	3–3 OT	New York Islanders (1983–84)	44–25–6
76	W	March 24, 1984	5–2	@ Montreal Canadiens (1983–84)	45–25–6
77	W	March 27, 1984	6–4	@ Quebec Nordiques (1983–84)	46–25–6
78	W	March 29, 1984	4–3	Hartford Whalers (1983–84)	47–25–6
79	W	March 31, 1984	2–1	Montreal Canadiens (1983–84)	48–25–6

April

Game	Result	Date	Score	Opponent	Record
80	W	April 1, 1984	3–1	@ New Jersey Devils (1983–84)	49–25–6

Legend: Win (2 points) Loss (0 points) Tie (1 point)

== Playoffs ==
The Bruins lost the Division semi-finals (3–0) to the Montreal Canadiens.

== Player statistics ==
=== Regular season ===
Scoring

Player	Pos	GP	G	A	Pts	PIM	+/-	PPG	SHG	GWG
Barry Pederson	C	80	39	77	116	64	27	10	3	7
Rick Middleton	RW	80	47	58	105	14	26	16	4	6
Raymond Bourque	D	78	31	65	96	57	51	12	1	5
Tom Fergus	C	69	25	36	61	12	8	6	0	3
Mike O'Connell	D	75	18	42	60	42	18	9	0	1
Keith Crowder	RW	63	24	28	52	128	12	4	0	4
Mike Krushelnyski	LW/C	66	25	20	45	55	9	3	2	1
Craig MacTavish	C	70	20	23	43	35	9	7	0	4
Gord Kluzak	D	80	10	27	37	135	9	5	0	3
Nevin Markwart	LW	70	14	16	30	121	2	0	0	3
Peter McNab	C	52	14	16	30	10	7	2	0	3
Dave Silk	RW	35	13	17	30	64	11	5	0	1
Terry O'Reilly	RW	58	12	18	30	124	9	2	0	2
Bruce Crowder	RW	74	6	14	20	44	1	0	0	0
Mike Milbury	D	74	2	17	19	159	2	0	0	1
Guy Lapointe	D	45	2	16	18	34	-3	1	0	1
Mike Gillis	LW	50	6	11	17	35	-7	0	0	1
Randy Hillier	D	69	3	12	15	125	-5	0	0	0
Steve Kasper	C	27	3	11	14	19	3	0	0	0
Luc Dufour	LW	41	6	4	10	47	2	0	0	1
Dave Donnelly	C	16	3	4	7	2	13	0	0	0
Lyndon Byers	RW	10	2	4	6	32	3	0	0	0
Jim Nill	RW	27	3	2	5	81	-5	0	0	0
Doug Kostynski	C	9	3	1	4	2	2	0	0	0
Greg Johnston	RW	15	2	1	3	2	-3	0	0	1
John Blum	D	12	1	1	2	30	5	0	0	1
Brian Curran	D	16	1	1	2	57	0	0	0	0
Jim Schoenfeld	D	39	0	2	2	20	18	0	0	0
Dave Reid	LW	8	1	0	1	2	1	0	0	0
Geoff Courtnall	LW	4	0	0	0	0	-1	0	0	0
Doug Keans	G	33	0	0	0	2	0	0	0	0
Mike Moffat	G	4	0	0	0	0	0	0	0	0
Pete Peeters	G	50	0	0	0	36	0	0	0	0

Goaltending

Player	MIN	GP	W	L	T	GA	GAA	SO
Pete Peeters	2868	50	29	16	2	151	3.16	0
Doug Keans	1779	33	19	8	3	92	3.10	2
Mike Moffat	186	4	1	1	1	15	4.84	0
Team:	4833	80	49	25	6	258	3.20	2

=== Playoffs ===
Scoring

Player	Pos	GP	G	A	Pts	PIM	PPG	SHG	GWG
Tom Fergus	C	3	2	0	2	9	1	0	0
Raymond Bourque	D	3	0	2	2	0	0	0	0
Barry Pederson	C	3	0	1	1	2	0	0	0
John Blum	D	3	0	0	0	4	0	0	0
Bruce Crowder	RW	3	0	0	0	0	0	0	0
Keith Crowder	RW	3	0	0	0	7	0	0	0
Brian Curran	D	3	0	0	0	7	0	0	0
Dave Donnelly	C	3	0	0	0	0	0	0	0
Mike Gillis	LW	3	0	0	0	2	0	0	0
Steve Kasper	C	3	0	0	0	7	0	0	0
Gord Kluzak	D	3	0	0	0	0	0	0	0
Luc Dufour	LW	2	0	0	0	0	0	0	0
Mike Krushelnyski	LW/C	2	0	0	0	0	0	0	0
Craig MacTavish	C	1	0	0	0	0	0	0	0
Rick Middleton	RW	3	0	0	0	0	0	0	0
Mike Milbury	D	3	0	0	0	12	0	0	0
Jim Nill	RW	3	0	0	0	4	0	0	0
Mike O'Connell	D	3	0	0	0	0	0	0	0
Terry O'Reilly	RW	3	0	0	0	14	0	0	0
Pete Peeters	G	3	0	0	0	2	0	0	0
Dave Silk	RW	3	0	0	0	7	0	0	0

Goaltending

Player	MIN	GP	W	L	GA	GAA	SO
Pete Peeters	180	3	0	3	10	3.33	0
Team:	180	3	0	3	10	3.33	0

Note:

Pos = Position;GP = Games played; G = Goals; A = Assists; Pts = Points; PIM = Penalty minutes; +/- = Plus/minus; PPG = Power-play goals; SHG = Short-handed goals; GWG = Game-winning goals
Pos = Position;GP = Games played; Min, TOI = Minutes played; W = Wins; L = Losses; T,T/OT = Ties; OTL = Overtime losses; GA = Goals-against; GAA = Goals-against average; SO = Shutouts; SA = Shots against; SV = Shots saved;SV% = Save percentage;

== Draft picks ==
Boston's draft picks at the 1983 NHL entry draft held at the Montreal Forum in Montreal.

Round	#	Player	Nationality	College/Junior/Club team (League)
1	21	Nevin Markwart	Canada	Regina Pats (WHL)
2	42	Greg Johnston	Canada	Toronto Marlboros (OHL)
3	62	Greg Puhalski	Canada	Kitchener Rangers (OHL)
4	82	Allan LaRochelle	Canada	Saskatoon Blades (WHL)
5	102	Allen Pedersen	Canada	Medicine Hat Tigers (WHL)
6	122	Terry Taillefer	Canada	St. Albert Saints (AJHL)
7	142	Ian Armstrong	Canada	Peterborough Petes (OHL)
8	162	Francois Olivier	Canada	St-Jean Castors (QMJHL)
9	182	Harri Laurila	Finland	Lahti (Finland)
10	202	Paul Fitzsimmons	United States	Northeastern University (ECAC)
11	222	Norm Foster	Canada	Penticton Knights (BCJHL)
12	242	Greg Murphy	United States	Trinity-Pawling High School (USHS-NY)

== See also ==
- 1983–84 NHL season
