= 1983–84 Detroit Red Wings season =

National Hockey League team season

1983–84 Detroit Red Wings
- Division: 3rd Norris
- Conference: 7th Campbell
- 1983–84 record: 31–42–7
- Home record: 18–20–2
- Road record: 13–22–5
- Goals for: 298
- Goals against: 323

Team information
- General manager: Jim Devellano
- Coach: Nick Polano
- Captain: Danny Gare
- Alternate captains: None
- Arena: Joe Louis Arena
- Average attendance: 16,727

Team leaders
- Goals: Steve Yzerman (39)
- Assists: Ivan Boldirev and Steve Yzerman (48)
- Points: Steve Yzerman (87)
- Penalty minutes: Joe Paterson (148)
- Plus/minus: Kelly Kisio (16)
- Wins: Greg Stefan (19)
- Goals against average: Greg Stefan (3.51)

The 1983–84 Detroit Red Wings season was the Red Wings' 52nd season, the franchise's 58th.

== Offseason ==
The Red Wings drafted Steve Yzerman in the first round, fourth overall.

== Regular season ==
=== Final standings ===
Norris Division
	GP	W	L	T	GF	GA	Pts
**Minnesota North Stars**	80	39	31	10	345	344	88
**St. Louis Blues**	80	32	41	7	293	316	71
**Detroit Red Wings**	80	31	42	7	298	323	69
**Chicago Black Hawks**	80	30	42	8	277	311	68
Toronto Maple Leafs	80	26	45	9	303	387	61

Note: GP = Games played, W = Wins, L = Losses, T = Ties, Pts = Points, GF = Goals for, GA = Goals against
Note: Teams that qualified for the playoffs are highlighted in bold.

=== Record vs. opponents ===
Norris Division record vs. opponents

==== Vs. Campbell Conference ====
**Vs. Norris Division**

1983–84 NHL records
Team	**CHI**	**DET**	**MIN**	**STL**	**TOR**	**Total**
Chicago	—	4−4	2−6	4−3−1	5−2−1	**15−15−2**
Detroit	4−4	—	2−6	5−3	3−5	**14−18−0**
Minnesota	6−2	6−2	—	5−2−1	5−2−1	**22−8−2**
St. Louis	3−4−1	3−5	2−5−1	—	6−2	**14−16−2**
Toronto	2−5−1	5−3	2−5−1	2−6	—	**11−19−2**

**Vs. Smythe Division**

1983–84 NHL records
Team	**CGY**	**EDM**	**LAK**	**VAN**	**WIN**	**Total**
Chicago	1−2	1−2	0−3	2−1	1−2	**5−10−0**
Detroit	2−1	0−3	0−2−1	1−2	1−0−2	**4−8−3**
Minnesota	1−2	0−2−1	1−1−1	1−1−1	2−1	**5−7−3**
St. Louis	0−2−1	2−1	1−1−1	2−1	1−2	**6−7−2**
Toronto	0−1−2	1−2	2−0−1	0−1−2	0−3	**3−7−5**

==== Vs. Wales Conference ====
**Vs. Adams Division**

1983–84 NHL records
Team	**BOS**	**BUF**	**HFD**	**MTL**	**QUE**	**Total**
Chicago	2−1	2−1	1−2	0−2−1	1−1−1	**6−7−2**
Detroit	1−2	1−1−1	1−1−1	0−3	2−1	**5−8−2**
Minnesota	2−1	2−1	0−3	2−1	0−2−1	**6−8−1**
St. Louis	0−3	1−2	1−2	0−3	0−2−1	**2−12−1**
Toronto	2−1	0−2−1	1−2	1−2	1−2	**5−9−1**

**Vs. Patrick Division**

1983–84 NHL records
Team	**NJD**	**NYI**	**NYR**	**PHI**	**PIT**	**WSH**	**Total**
Chicago	1−2	0−3	1−2	0−1−2	1−1−1	1−1−1	**4−10−4**
Detroit	1−2	2−1	0−3	0−1−2	3−0	2−1	**8−8−2**
Minnesota	2−1	0−2−1	1−1−1	1−0−2	2−1	0−3	**6−8−4**
St. Louis	3−0	1−1−1	1−2	2−1	2−0−1	1−2	**10−6−2**
Toronto	3−0	1−2	2−1	0−3	1−1−1	0−3	**7−10−1**

== Schedule and results ==
1983–84 regular season
October

Game	Result	Date	Score	Opponent	Record
1	T	October 5, 1983	6–6 OT	@ Winnipeg Jets (1983–84)	0–0–1
2	L	October 8, 1983	3–6	New Jersey Devils (1983–84)	0–1–1
3	L	October 9, 1983	4–6	@ Chicago Black Hawks (1983–84)	0–2–1
4	L	October 12, 1983	3–8	@ Edmonton Oilers (1983–84)	0–3–1
5	T	October 15, 1983	3–3 OT	@ Los Angeles Kings (1983–84)	0–3–2
6	W	October 19, 1983	4–2	St. Louis Blues (1983–84)	1–3–2
7	W	October 22, 1983	4–1	Calgary Flames (1983–84)	2–3–2
8	W	October 26, 1983	6–5 OT	Buffalo Sabres (1983–84)	3–3–2
9	W	October 29, 1983	4–3 OT	Quebec Nordiques (1983–84)	4–3–2

November

Game	Result	Date	Score	Opponent	Record
10	W	November 1, 1983	3–2	@ St. Louis Blues (1983–84)	5–3–2
11	W	November 3, 1983	7–4	Chicago Black Hawks (1983–84)	6–3–2
12	L	November 5, 1983	2–3	Vancouver Canucks (1983–84)	6–4–2
13	L	November 6, 1983	2–3	@ Washington Capitals (1983–84)	6–5–2
14	L	November 9, 1983	3–5	Minnesota North Stars (1983–84)	6–6–2
15	L	November 12, 1983	3–7	Edmonton Oilers (1983–84)	6–7–2
16	L	November 13, 1983	3–6	@ New York Rangers (1983–84)	6–8–2
17	W	November 15, 1983	3–1	@ Quebec Nordiques (1983–84)	7–8–2
18	L	November 17, 1983	2–4	@ Montreal Canadiens (1983–84)	7–9–2
19	L	November 19, 1983	4–5	@ Toronto Maple Leafs (1983–84)	7–10–2
20	W	November 23, 1983	3–0	St. Louis Blues (1983–84)	8–10–2
21	W	November 25, 1983	5–2	Pittsburgh Penguins (1983–84)	9–10–2
22	W	November 26, 1983	7–4	@ Pittsburgh Penguins (1983–84)	10–10–2
23	L	November 30, 1983	3–5	Toronto Maple Leafs (1983–84)	10–11–2

December

Game	Result	Date	Score	Opponent	Record
24	L	December 3, 1983	2–4	New York Rangers (1983–84)	10–12–2
25	L	December 4, 1983	0–6	@ New Jersey Devils (1983–84)	10–13–2
26	L	December 7, 1983	2–7	@ Minnesota North Stars (1983–84)	10–14–2
27	L	December 10, 1983	3–8	@ St. Louis Blues (1983–84)	10–15–2
28	L	December 11, 1983	2–4	@ Chicago Black Hawks (1983–84)	10–16–2
29	L	December 13, 1983	5–7	Los Angeles Kings (1983–84)	10–17–2
30	L	December 15, 1983	2–4	@ New York Islanders (1983–84)	10–18–2
31	T	December 17, 1983	3–3 OT	Philadelphia Flyers (1983–84)	10–18–3
32	T	December 18, 1983	3–3 OT	@ Philadelphia Flyers (1983–84)	10–18–4
33	L	December 21, 1983	5–9	Vancouver Canucks (1983–84)	10–19–4
34	W	December 23, 1983	9–2	Toronto Maple Leafs (1983–84)	11–19–4
35	L	December 26, 1983	2–6	@ Toronto Maple Leafs (1983–84)	11–20–4
36	W	December 28, 1983	3–2 OT	@ Washington Capitals (1983–84)	12–20–4
37	W	December 29, 1983	6–1	@ New Jersey Devils (1983–84)	13–20–4
38	W	December 31, 1983	4–3	Chicago Black Hawks (1983–84)	14–20–4

January

Game	Result	Date	Score	Opponent	Record
39	W	January 3, 1984	7–1	Hartford Whalers (1983–84)	15–20–4
40	L	January 5, 1984	1–5	@ Montreal Canadiens (1983–84)	15–21–4
41	L	January 7, 1984	4–8	Philadelphia Flyers (1983–84)	15–22–4
42	L	January 9, 1984	3–7	Edmonton Oilers (1983–84)	15–23–4
43	L	January 11, 1984	2–7	Boston Bruins (1983–84)	15–24–4
44	L	January 14, 1984	1–2	Buffalo Sabres (1983–84)	15–25–4
45	L	January 16, 1984	5–8	@ New York Rangers (1983–84)	15–26–4
46	L	January 18, 1984	2–4	Calgary Flames (1983–84)	15–27–4
47	L	January 20, 1984	5–8	Minnesota North Stars (1983–84)	15–28–4
48	L	January 21, 1984	1–5	@ Minnesota North Stars (1983–84)	15–29–4
49	W	January 24, 1984	4–0	New York Islanders (1983–84)	16–29–4
50	T	January 27, 1984	2–2 OT	@ Buffalo Sabres (1983–84)	16–29–5
51	W	January 28, 1984	4–3	@ New York Islanders (1983–84)	17–29–5

February

Game	Result	Date	Score	Opponent	Record
52	T	February 1, 1984	6–6 OT	Hartford Whalers (1983–84)	17–29–6
53	L	February 4, 1984	3–6	Toronto Maple Leafs (1983–84)	17–30–6
54	W	February 5, 1984	6–5	@ Boston Bruins (1983–84)	18–30–6
55	L	February 7, 1984	1–4	@ Hartford Whalers (1983–84)	18–31–6
56	W	February 9, 1984	9–3	Pittsburgh Penguins (1983–84)	19–31–6
57	W	February 11, 1984	6–4	@ Minnesota North Stars (1983–84)	20–31–6
58	T	February 12, 1984	2–2 OT	@ Winnipeg Jets (1983–84)	20–31–7
59	L	February 15, 1984	3–4	St. Louis Blues (1983–84)	20–32–7
60	W	February 18, 1984	6–0	Chicago Black Hawks (1983–84)	21–32–7
61	W	February 19, 1984	6–2	@ Toronto Maple Leafs (1983–84)	22–32–7
62	W	February 22, 1984	5–2	Minnesota North Stars (1983–84)	23–32–7
63	W	February 25, 1984	4–1	Washington Capitals (1983–84)	24–32–7
64	W	February 26, 1984	4–2	@ Chicago Black Hawks (1983–84)	25–32–7
65	L	February 28, 1984	2–6	@ Quebec Nordiques (1983–84)	25–33–7

March

Game	Result	Date	Score	Opponent	Record
66	L	March 1, 1984	1–3	Montreal Canadiens (1983–84)	25–34–7
67	W	March 3, 1984	6–1	Winnipeg Jets (1983–84)	26–34–7
68	L	March 5, 1984	1–5	@ Minnesota North Stars (1983–84)	26–35–7
69	W	March 6, 1984	3–1	@ St. Louis Blues (1983–84)	27–35–7
70	W	March 8, 1984	6–3	St. Louis Blues (1983–84)	28–35–7
71	L	March 10, 1984	3–4 OT	@ Toronto Maple Leafs (1983–84)	28–36–7
72	L	March 14, 1984	2–4	Boston Bruins (1983–84)	28–37–7
73	L	March 15, 1984	3–5	@ St. Louis Blues (1983–84)	28–38–7
74	L	March 17, 1984	3–4	Minnesota North Stars (1983–84)	28–39–7
75	W	March 20, 1984	6–3	@ Vancouver Canucks (1983–84)	29–39–7
76	W	March 22, 1984	6–4	@ Calgary Flames (1983–84)	30–39–7
77	L	March 24, 1984	7–9	@ Los Angeles Kings (1983–84)	30–40–7
78	W	March 28, 1984	4–2	Toronto Maple Leafs (1983–84)	31–40–7
79	L	March 31, 1984	2–4	Chicago Black Hawks (1983–84)	31–41–7

April

Game	Result	Date	Score	Opponent	Record
80	L	April 1, 1984	3–4	@ Chicago Black Hawks (1983–84)	31–42–7

Legend: Win (2 points) Loss (0 points) Tie (1 point)

== Playoffs ==
Since they last made it into the playoffs in 1978, they made it again this season but lost in the first round in a best of five series by St. Louis in 4 games, or 1–3.

== Player statistics ==
=== Regular season ===
Scoring

Player	Pos	GP	G	A	Pts	PIM	+/-	PPG	SHG	GWG
Steve Yzerman	C	80	39	48	87	33	-17	13	0	2
Ivan Boldirev	C	75	35	48	83	20	3	12	0	4
Ron Duguay	C/RW	80	33	47	80	34	-26	13	1	1
John Ogrodnick	LW	64	42	36	78	14	-16	19	3	5
Reed Larson	D	78	23	39	62	122	-10	10	0	5
Kelly Kisio	C	70	23	37	60	34	16	1	0	2
Brad Park	D	80	5	53	58	85	-29	4	0	0
Lane Lambert	RW	73	20	15	35	115	-5	1	0	2
Danny Gare	RW	63	13	13	26	147	3	1	0	2
Eddie Johnstone	RW	46	12	11	23	54	3	4	0	0
Greg Smith	D	75	3	20	23	108	6	0	0	1
Bob Manno	D	62	9	13	22	60	-1	0	1	4
Dwight Foster	RW	52	9	12	21	50	-4	0	2	1
Blake Dunlop	C	57	6	14	20	20	-13	1	1	0
Randy Ladouceur	D	71	3	17	20	58	-12	0	0	0
Claude Loiselle	C	28	4	6	10	32	4	0	0	0
John Barrett	D	78	2	8	10	78	0	0	0	0
Rick MacLeish	C	25	2	8	10	4	-4	0	0	0
Colin Campbell	D	68	3	4	7	108	0	0	0	1
Joe Paterson	LW	41	2	5	7	148	0	0	0	0
Paul Woods	LW	57	2	5	7	18	-16	0	0	0
Pierre Aubry	LW	14	4	1	5	8	-1	0	0	0
Andre St. Laurent	C	19	1	3	4	17	-3	0	1	0
Murray Craven	LW	15	0	4	4	6	2	0	0	0
Brad Smith	RW	8	2	1	3	36	-2	0	0	0
Ted Nolan	C	19	1	2	3	26	-11	0	0	1
Greg Stefan	G	50	0	3	3	14	0	0	0	0
Barry Melrose	D	21	0	1	1	74	0	0	0	0
Corrado Micalef	G	14	0	1	1	2	0	0	0	0
Eddie Mio	G	24	0	1	1	6	0	0	0	0
Jody Gage	RW	3	0	0	0	0	0	0	0	0
Ken Holland	G	3	0	0	0	0	0	0	0	0
Brian Johnson	RW	3	0	0	0	5	-3	0	0	0

Goaltending

Player	MIN	GP	W	L	T	GA	GAA	SO
Greg Stefan	2600	50	19	22	2	152	3.51	2
Eddie Mio	1295	24	7	11	3	95	4.40	1
Corrado Micalef	808	14	5	8	1	52	3.86	0
Ken Holland	146	3	0	1	1	10	4.11	0
Team:	4849	80	31	42	7	309	3.82	3

=== Playoffs ===
Scoring

Player	Pos	GP	G	A	Pts	PIM	PPG	SHG	GWG
Steve Yzerman	C	4	3	3	6	0	1	0	1
Ron Duguay	C/RW	4	2	3	5	2	1	0	0
Ivan Boldirev	C	4	0	5	5	4	0	0	0
Bob Manno	D	4	0	3	3	0	0	0	0
Brad Park	D	3	0	3	3	0	0	0	0
Danny Gare	RW	4	2	0	2	38	0	0	0
Reed Larson	D	4	2	0	2	21	2	0	0
Kelly Kisio	C	4	1	0	1	4	0	0	0
Randy Ladouceur	D	4	1	0	1	6	0	1	0
Greg Smith	D	4	1	0	1	8	0	0	0
Blake Dunlop	C	4	0	1	1	4	0	0	0
Dwight Foster	RW	3	0	1	1	0	0	0	0
Pierre Aubry	LW	3	0	0	0	2	0	0	0
John Barrett	D	4	0	0	0	4	0	0	0
Colin Campbell	D	4	0	0	0	21	0	0	0
Eddie Johnstone	RW	2	0	0	0	0	0	0	0
Lane Lambert	RW	4	0	0	0	10	0	0	0
Rick MacLeish	C	1	0	0	0	0	0	0	0
Corrado Micalef	G	1	0	0	0	0	0	0	0
Eddie Mio	G	1	0	0	0	0	0	0	0
John Ogrodnick	LW	4	0	0	0	0	0	0	0
Joe Paterson	LW	3	0	0	0	7	0	0	0
Greg Stefan	G	3	0	0	0	0	0	0	0

Goaltending

Player	MIN	GP	W	L	GA	GAA	SO
Greg Stefan	210	3	1	2	8	2.29	0
Corrado Micalef	7	1	0	0	2	17.14	0
Eddie Mio	63	1	0	1	3	2.86	0
Team:	280	4	1	3	13	2.79	0

Note: GP = Games played; G = Goals; A = Assists; Pts = Points; +/- = Plus-minus PIM = Penalty minutes; PPG = Power-play goals; SHG = Short-handed goals; GWG = Game-winning goals;
MIN = Minutes played; W = Wins; L = Losses; T = Ties; GA = Goals against; GAA = Goals-against average; SO = Shutouts;

== Awards and records ==
- Bill Masterton Memorial Trophy: || Brad Park

== Draft picks ==
Round	#	Player	Nationality	College/Junior/Club team (League)
1	4	Steve Yzerman	Canada	Peterborough Petes (OHL)
2	25	Lane Lambert	Canada	Saskatoon Blades (WHL)
3	46	Bob Probert	Canada	Brantford Alexanders (OHL)
4	68	Dave Korol	Canada	Winnipeg Warriors (WHL)
5	86	Petr Klíma	Czechoslovakia	Litvinov (Czechoslovakia)
5	88	Joey Kocur	Canada	Saskatoon Blades (WHL)
6	106	Chris Pusey	Canada	Brantford Alexanders (OHL)
7	126	Bob Pierson	Canada	London Knights (OHL)
8	146	Craig Butz	Canada	Kelowna Wings (WHL)
9	166	Dave Sikorski	United States	Cornwall Royals (OHL)
10	186	Stu Grimson	Canada	Regina Pats (WHL)
11	206	Jeff Frank	Canada/ United States	Regina Pats (WHL)
12	226	Chuck Chiatto	United States	Cranbrook High School (USHS-MI)
