= 1983–84 Vancouver Canucks season =

14th season in franchise history

1983–84 Vancouver Canucks
- Division: 3rd Smythe
- Conference: 4th Campbell
- 1983–84 record: 32–39–9
- Home record: 20–16–4
- Road record: 12–23–5
- Goals for: 306
- Goals against: 328

Team information
- General manager: Harry Neale
- Coach: Roger Neilson (17–28–6); Harry Neale (15–11–3)
- Captain: Stan Smyl
- Alternate captains: Doug Halward; Rick Lanz
- Arena: Pacific Coliseum
- Average attendance: 13,626

Team leaders
- Goals: Tony Tanti (45)
- Assists: Patrik Sundstrom (53)
- Points: Patrik Sundstrom (91)
- Penalty minutes: Tiger Williams (294)
- Wins: John Garrett (14)
- Goals against average: Frank Caprice (3.39)

The 1983–84 Vancouver Canucks season was the team's 14th in the National Hockey League (NHL).

== Offseason ==
The Canucks had the ninth overall pick in the Entry Draft and chose right-winger Cam Neely, who had just led the Portland Winterhawks to the Memorial Cup Championship. Neely tallied 31 points and 57 penalty minutes in 56 games his rookie season.

=== Training camp ===
The Canucks began their training camp at the Cowichan Community Centre in Duncan, on September 11.

== Regular season ==
The second game of the season was a wild, shoot-out affair, with the Canucks beating the Minnesota North Stars 10–9. Patrik Sundstrom scored the winning goal to go along with five assists in the game. His right winger, Tony Tanti, scored twice and added three helpers. Two nights later, in a 7–4 win over Toronto, Tanti scored three goals, all assisted by Sundstrom. The two would combine for a large piece of the Canucks' offense this season and, along with Dave "Tiger" Williams on left wing, quickly establish themselves as the club's number one line. Tanti finished with a club-record 45 goals while Sundstrom tallied six assists and seven points (both club records) in a 9–5 win in Pittsburgh on February 29, helping him in establishing a club record of 91 points. Williams again led the NHL in penalty minutes, racking up 294.

On December 10, injuries to Richard Brodeur and John Garrett forced the Canucks to give rookie goalie Frank Caprice his first NHL start against the mighty Edmonton Oilers on Hockey Night In Canada. Things didn't look good to start, when Pat Hughes beat him to the five-hole at the 16 second mark, but after that he stopped 41 of 42 shots, many coming off of the sticks of future Hall-of-Famers, and earned the game's First Star in a 3–2 victory. Caprice then backstopped the Canucks to two more victories before suffering his first loss December 18 in Buffalo by a 3–2 score.

That game in Buffalo began an awful 3–14–2 slide. During that miserable stretch, the Canucks managed a 3–3 tie in Los Angeles on January 4, the game in which Thomas Gradin registered his 408th point as a Canuck to pass Don Lever as the club's all-time leading scorer. In the next three games, the Canucks lost in Minnesota, Chicago, and St. Louis by identical 2–0 scores, marking the first time that the team has been shut out in three consecutive games. They did score 4 in the next game they played, though, in a 6–4 loss at the Washington Capitals, to end the goal drought at 223 minutes and 10 seconds, which stood for 32 years as the franchise record. On January 26, following a game in which the Canucks lost 6–4 to Edmonton after leading 4–2 (Wayne Gretzky recorded a point in his 51st straight game—the last game of his NHL record scoring streak), Roger Neilson was fired as coach. GM Harry Neale took over for the remainder of the season.

The club won its first game under Neale, 4–0 over Philadelphia, thanks to a great performance by Brodeur and two points from Jean-Marc Lanthier in his NHL debut. They played respectably in the last 29 games (15–11–3) and finished with 73 points—in a tie for third place with Winnipeg. The Canucks, with more wins (32–31), won the tiebreaker and drew Calgary, again, as a first-round playoff opponent.

=== Final standings ===
Smythe Division
	GP	W	L	T	GF	GA	Pts
**Edmonton Oilers**	80	57	18	5	446	314	119
**Calgary Flames**	80	34	32	14	311	314	82
**Vancouver Canucks**	80	32	39	9	306	328	73
**Winnipeg Jets**	80	31	38	11	340	374	73
Los Angeles Kings	80	23	44	13	309	376	59

Note: GP = Games played, W = Wins, L = Losses, T = Ties, Pts = Points, GF = Goals for, GA = Goals against
Note: Teams that qualified for the playoffs are highlighted in bold.

=== Record vs. opponents ===
Smythe Division record vs. opponents

==== Vs. Campbell Conference ====
**Vs. Smythe Division**

1983–84 NHL records
Team	**CGY**	**EDM**	**LAK**	**VAN**	**WIN**	**Total**
Calgary	—	0−7−1	4−3−1	5−2−1	4−1−3	**13−13−6**
Edmonton	7−0−1	—	6−2	6−1−1	8−0	**27−3−2**
Los Angeles	3−4−1	2−6	—	4−3−1	0−5−3	**9−18−5**
Vancouver	2−5−1	1−6−1	3−4−1	—	5−2−1	**11−17−4**
Winnipeg	1−4−3	0−8	5−0−3	2−5−1	—	**8−17−7**

**Vs. Norris Division**

1983–84 NHL records
Team	**CHI**	**DET**	**MIN**	**STL**	**TOR**	**Total**
Calgary	2−1	1−2	2−1	2−0−1	1−0−2	**8−4−3**
Edmonton	2−1	3−0	2−0−1	1−2	2−1	**10−4−1**
Los Angeles	3−0	2−0−1	1−1−1	1−1−1	0−2−1	**7−4−4**
Vancouver	1−2	2−1	1−1−1	1−2	1−0−2	**6−6−3**
Winnipeg	2−1	0−1−2	1−2	2−1	3−0	**8−5−2**

**Vs. Wales Conference**

**Vs. Adams Division**

1983–84 NHL records
Team	**BOS**	**BUF**	**HFD**	**MTL**	**QUE**	**Total**
Calgary	0−2−1	0−3	2−0−1	1−2	1−2	**4−9−2**
Edmonton	2−1	2−1	2−1	2−1	3−0	**11−4−0**
Los Angeles	0−3	0−2−1	1−2	2−1	0−3	**3−11−1**
Vancouver	0−2−1	0−3	3−0	2−1	2−1	**7−7−1**
Winnipeg	1−2	0−3	2−0−1	1−1−1	2−1	**6−7−2**

**Vs. Patrick Division**

1983–84 NHL records
Team	**NJD**	**NYI**	**NYR**	**PHI**	**PIT**	**WSH**	**Total**
Calgary	2−0−1	3−0	1−2	1−2	1−0−2	1−2	**9−6−3**
Edmonton	2−0−1	0−3	2−1	0−2−1	3−0	2−1	**9−7−2**
Los Angeles	1−2	0−2−1	0−1−2	1−2	2−1	0−3	**4−11−3**
Vancouver	2−1	0−3	1−1–1	2−1	2−1	1−2	**8−9−1**
Winnipeg	2−1	2−1	1−2	1−2	2−1	1−2	**9−9−0**

== Schedule and results ==
=== Pre-season ===
The Canucks released their pre-season schedule on June 16, 1983.

=== Regular season ===
The Canucks released their regular season schedule on August 9, 1983.

1983–84 regular season
October

Game	Result	Date	Score	Opponent	Record
1	L	October 5, 1983	3–5	Calgary Flames (1983–84)	0–1–0
2	W	October 7, 1983	10–9	Minnesota North Stars (1983–84)	1–1–0
3	W	October 9, 1983	7–4	Toronto Maple Leafs (1983–84)	2–1–0
4	L	October 11, 1983	2–3	@ St. Louis Blues (1983–84)	2–2–0
5	L	October 12, 1983	1–2	@ Chicago Black Hawks (1983–84)	2–3–0
6	L	October 15, 1983	4–5	@ Montreal Canadiens (1983–84)	2–4–0
7	L	October 19, 1983	7–10	Edmonton Oilers (1983–84)	2–5–0
8	W	October 21, 1983	5–4	New Jersey Devils (1983–84)	3–5–0
9	T	October 22, 1983	5–5 OT	@ Edmonton Oilers (1983–84)	3–5–1
10	W	October 25, 1983	7–1	St. Louis Blues (1983–84)	4–5–1
11	W	October 28, 1983	5–4 OT	Hartford Whalers (1983–84)	5–5–1
12	L	October 30, 1983	3–4 OT	@ Calgary Flames (1983–84)	5–6–1

November

Game	Result	Date	Score	Opponent	Record
13	L	November 1, 1983	3–6	@ New York Islanders (1983–84)	5–7–1
14	L	November 4, 1983	4–5 OT	@ Washington Capitals (1983–84)	5–8–1
15	W	November 5, 1983	3–2	@ Detroit Red Wings (1983–84)	6–8–1
16	L	November 9, 1983	2–7	Winnipeg Jets (1983–84)	6–9–1
17	W	November 11, 1983	4–2	Winnipeg Jets (1983–84)	7–9–1
18	W	November 13, 1983	4–3	Montreal Canadiens (1983–84)	8–9–1
19	L	November 16, 1983	2–5	@ Los Angeles Kings (1983–84)	8–10–1
20	L	November 18, 1983	2–5	Los Angeles Kings (1983–84)	8–11–1
21	W	November 20, 1983	8–3	Los Angeles Kings (1983–84)	9–11–1
22	W	November 23, 1983	4–1	@ Winnipeg Jets (1983–84)	10–11–1
23	L	November 26, 1983	4–5	Philadelphia Flyers (1983–84)	10–12–1
24	T	November 28, 1983	3–3 OT	@ New York Rangers (1983–84)	10–12–2
25	W	November 30, 1983	6–2	@ Hartford Whalers (1983–84)	11–12–2

December

Game	Result	Date	Score	Opponent	Record
26	L	December 1, 1983	1–7	@ Boston Bruins (1983–84)	11–13–2
27	T	December 3, 1983	5–5 OT	@ Toronto Maple Leafs (1983–84)	11–13–3
28	L	December 6, 1983	2–5	New York Islanders (1983–84)	11–14–3
29	L	December 7, 1983	4–5	@ Edmonton Oilers (1983–84)	11–15–3
30	W	December 10, 1983	3–2	Edmonton Oilers (1983–84)	12–15–3
31	W	December 13, 1983	6–2	Quebec Nordiques (1983–84)	13–15–3
32	W	December 16, 1983	5–3	Calgary Flames (1983–84)	14–15–3
33	L	December 18, 1983	2–3	@ Buffalo Sabres (1983–84)	14–16–3
34	L	December 20, 1983	4–6	@ Quebec Nordiques (1983–84)	14–17–3
35	W	December 21, 1983	9–5	@ Detroit Red Wings (1983–84)	15–17–3
36	L	December 26, 1983	4–5 OT	Los Angeles Kings (1983–84)	15–18–3
37	L	December 28, 1983	2–4	Edmonton Oilers (1983–84)	15–19–3
38	L	December 30, 1983	1–5	@ Calgary Flames (1983–84)	15–20–3
39	T	December 31, 1983	5–5 OT	Boston Bruins (1983–84)	15–20–4

January

Game	Result	Date	Score	Opponent	Record
40	W	January 3, 1984	4–3	@ Los Angeles Kings (1983–84)	16–20–4
41	T	January 4, 1984	3–3 OT	@ Los Angeles Kings (1983–84)	16–20–5
42	L	January 7, 1984	0–2	@ Minnesota North Stars (1983–84)	16–21–5
43	L	January 8, 1984	0–2	@ Chicago Black Hawks (1983–84)	16–22–5
44	L	January 10, 1984	0–2	@ St. Louis Blues (1983–84)	16–23–5
45	L	January 13, 1984	4–6	Washington Capitals (1983–84)	16–24–5
46	W	January 15, 1984	5–0	Hartford Whalers (1983–84)	17–24–5
47	L	January 17, 1984	1–5	Buffalo Sabres (1983–84)	17–25–5
48	L	January 18, 1984	5–7	@ Edmonton Oilers (1983–84)	17–26–5
49	T	January 20, 1984	6–6 OT	@ Winnipeg Jets (1983–84)	17–26–6
50	L	January 22, 1984	4–6	@ Winnipeg Jets (1983–84)	17–27–6
51	L	January 25, 1984	4–6	Edmonton Oilers (1983–84)	17–28–6
52	W	January 27, 1984	4–0	Philadelphia Flyers (1983–84)	18–28–6
53	W	January 29, 1984	3–2	New Jersey Devils (1983–84)	19–28–6

February

Game	Result	Date	Score	Opponent	Record
54	L	February 2, 1984	2–4	@ Los Angeles Kings (1983–84)	19–29–6
55	L	February 4, 1984	4–5	New York Rangers (1983–84)	19–30–6
56	L	February 5, 1984	2–4	@ Calgary Flames (1983–84)	19–31–6
57	W	February 7, 1984	4–2	@ Quebec Nordiques (1983–84)	20–31–6
58	W	February 9, 1984	7–6	@ Montreal Canadiens (1983–84)	21–31–6
59	L	February 11, 1984	4–6	@ New York Islanders (1983–84)	21–32–6
60	W	February 12, 1984	6–5	@ Philadelphia Flyers (1983–84)	22–32–6
61	L	February 17, 1984	1–4	Pittsburgh Penguins (1983–84)	22–33–6
62	W	February 19, 1984	5–2	Calgary Flames (1983–84)	23–33–6
63	L	February 21, 1984	2–5	Boston Bruins (1983–84)	23–34–6
64	L	February 23, 1984	2–3 OT	@ Calgary Flames (1983–84)	23–35–6
65	W	February 24, 1984	5–3	Los Angeles Kings (1983–84)	24–35–6
66	T	February 26, 1984	4–4 OT	Toronto Maple Leafs (1983–84)	24–35–7
67	W	February 28, 1984	3–2	@ Washington Capitals (1983–84)	25–35–7
68	W	February 29, 1984	9–5	@ Pittsburgh Penguins (1983–84)	26–35–7

March

Game	Result	Date	Score	Opponent	Record
69	L	March 2, 1984	2–4	@ New Jersey Devils (1983–84)	26–36–7
70	W	March 4, 1984	5–4	@ New York Rangers (1983–84)	27–36–7
71	W	March 7, 1984	4–3	Winnipeg Jets (1983–84)	28–36–7
72	W	March 9, 1984	4–3 OT	Chicago Black Hawks (1983–84)	29–36–7
73	L	March 11, 1984	2–12	@ Edmonton Oilers (1983–84)	29–37–7
74	W	March 13, 1984	4–3	Pittsburgh Penguins (1983–84)	30–37–7
75	L	March 17, 1984	2–5	Buffalo Sabres (1983–84)	30–38–7
76	L	March 20, 1984	3–6	Detroit Red Wings (1983–84)	30–39–7
77	W	March 23, 1984	4–3 OT	@ Winnipeg Jets (1983–84)	31–39–7
78	T	March 25, 1984	4–4 OT	Calgary Flames (1983–84)	31–39–8
79	W	March 28, 1984	5–1	Winnipeg Jets (1983–84)	32–39–8
80	T	March 30, 1984	3–3 OT	Minnesota North Stars (1983–84)	32–39–9

Legend: Win (2 points) Loss (0 points) Tie (1 point)

== Playoffs ==
This series between the Calgary Flames and Vancouver Canucks followed a similar script as in 1983.

The Flames won the first two games at the Saddledome by 4-2 and 5-3 scores before the series shifted to Vancouver. In the third game, Doug Halward became the fifth defenseman ever to register a playoff hat-trick (and the first Canuck player to do so) as the Canucks thrashed the Flames 7–0; Brodeur got the shutout. Game Four was a one-sided affair in favour of the Flames in which Paul Reinhart became the sixth defenseman to record a playoff hat-trick. 5-1 was the score.

== Draft picks ==
Vancouver's draft picks at the 1983 NHL entry draft held at the Montreal Forum in Montreal.

Round	#	Player	Nationality	College/Junior/Club team (League)
1	9	Cam Neely	Canada	Portland Winter Hawks (WHL)
2	30	David Bruce	Canada	Kitchener Rangers (OHL)
3	50	Scott Tottle	Canada	Peterborough Petes (OHL)
4	70	Tim Lorenz	Canada	Portland Winter Hawks (WHL)
5	90	Doug Quinn	Canada	Nanaimo Islanders (WHL)
6	110	Dave Lowry	Canada	London Knights (OHL)
7	130	Terry Maki	Canada	Brantford Alexanders (OHL)
8	150	John Labatt	United States	Minnetonka High School (USHS-MN)
9	170	Allan Measures	Canada	Calgary Wranglers (WHL)
10	190	Roger Grillo	United States	University of Maine (ECAC)
11	210	Steve Kayser	Canada	University of Vermont (ECAC)
12	230	Jay Mazur	Canada	Breck School (USHS-MN)

== Farm teams ==
- Fredericton Express, AHL (shared with Quebec).

== See also ==
- 1983–84 NHL season
