= 1983–84 Buffalo Sabres season =

NHL hockey team season

1983–84 Buffalo Sabres
- Division: 2nd Adams
- Conference: 3rd Wales
- 1983–84 record: 48–25–7
- Home record: 25–9–6
- Road record: 23–16–1
- Goals for: 315
- Goals against: 257

Team information
- General manager: Scotty Bowman
- Coach: Scotty Bowman
- Captain: Gilbert Perreault
- Alternate captains: None
- Arena: Buffalo Memorial Auditorium

Team leaders
- Goals: Dave Andreychuk (38)
- Assists: Gilbert Perreault (59)
- Points: Gilbert Perreault (90)
- Penalty minutes: Larry Playfair (209)
- Wins: Tom Barrasso (26)
- Goals against average: Tom Barrasso (2.85)

The 1983–84 Buffalo Sabres season was the Sabres' 14th season. Tom Barrasso was drafted by the Sabres with the 5th overall pick in the 1983 NHL entry draft, becoming the highest drafted goalie ever until Roberto Luongo was taken 4th overall in 1997. Skipping a college career, he went straight from high school to the NHL where he exceeded all expectations. Barrasso won the Calder Memorial Trophy and Vezina Trophy in his first season, becoming just the third player to win both awards in the same year.

== Offseason ==
=== NHL draft ===
Round	#	Player	Nationality	College/Junior/Club team
1	5	Tom Barrasso	United States	Acton-Boxboro H.S. (USHS-MA)
1	10	Normand Lacombe	Canada	University of New Hampshire (Hockey East)
1	11	Adam Creighton	Canada	Ottawa 67's (OHL)
2	31	John Tucker	Canada	Kitchener Rangers (OHL)
2	34	Richard Hajdu	Canada	Kamloops Blazers (WHL)
4	74	Daren Puppa	Canada	Kirkland Lake Midget All-Stars (USHS-MN)
5	94	Jason Meyer	Canada	Regina Pats (WHL)
6	114	Jim Hofford	Canada	Windsor Spitfires (OHL)
7	134	Christian Ruuttu	Finland	Pori (Finland)
8	154	Donald McSween	United States	Redford Royals (NAJHL)
9	174	Tim Hoover	Canada	Sault Ste. Marie Greyhounds (OHL)
10	194	Mark Ferner	Canada	Kamloops Blazers (WHL)
11	214	Uwe Krupp	West Germany	Cologne (West Germany)
12	234	Marc Hemelin	Canada	Shawinigan Cataractes (QMJHL)
12	235	Kermit Salfi	United States	Northwood School (USHS-NY)

== Regular season ==
=== Season standings ===
Adams Division
	GP	W	L	T	GF	GA	Pts
**Boston Bruins**	80	49	25	6	336	261	104
**Buffalo Sabres**	80	48	25	7	315	257	103
**Quebec Nordiques**	80	42	28	10	360	278	94
**Montreal Canadiens**	80	35	40	5	286	295	75
Hartford Whalers	80	28	42	10	288	320	66

Note: GP = Games played, W = Wins, L = Losses, T = Ties, Pts = Points, GF = Goals for, GA = Goals against
Note: Teams that qualified for the playoffs are highlighted in bold.

=== Record vs. opponents ===
Adams Division record vs. opponents

==== Vs. Wales Conference ====
**Vs. Adams Division**

1983–84 NHL records
Team	**BOS**	**BUF**	**HFD**	**MTL**	**QUE**	**Total**
Boston	—	4–4	5–2–1	6–2	4–4	**19–12–1**
Buffalo	4–4	—	5–3	8–0	1–6–1	**18–13–1**
Hartford	2–5–1	3–5	—	0–7−1	1–3−4	**6–20–6**
Montreal	2–6	0–8	7–0−1	—	3–5	**12–19–1**
Quebec	4–4	6–1–1	3–1−4	5–3	—	**18–9–5**

**Vs. Patrick Division**

1983–84 NHL records
Team	**NJD**	**NYI**	**NYR**	**PHI**	**PIT**	**WSH**	**Total**
Boston	2−1	2−0−1	2−0–1	1−1−1	3−0	2−1	**12−3−3**
Buffalo	2−0−1	0−3	1−1−1	3−0	3−0	2−0−1	**11−4−3**
Hartford	1−1–1	2–1	2–1	2–1	1–2	1−2	**9−8−1**
Montreal	2−1	0−3	2–1	0−2−1	2−0−1	0−3	**6−10−2**
Quebec	2−1	2−1	0−2–1	0−2−1	3−0	2−1	**9−7−2**

==== Vs. Campbell Conference ====
**Vs. Norris Division**

1983–84 NHL records
Team	**CHI**	**DET**	**MIN**	**STL**	**TOR**	**Total**
Boston	1–2	2–1	1–2	3–0	1–2	**8–7–0**
Buffalo	1−2	1−1−1	1−2	2−1	2−0−1	**7−6−2**
Hartford	2–1	1–1−1	3−0	2–1	2–1	**10–4–1**
Montreal	2−0–1	3−0	1–2	3–0	2−1	**11–3–1**
Quebec	1–1−1	1–2	2–0−1	2–0–1	2–1	**8–4–3**

**Vs. Smythe Division**

1983–84 NHL records
Team	**CGY**	**EDM**	**LAK**	**VAN**	**WIN**	**Total**
Boston	2−0−1	1−2	3−0	2−0−1	2−1	**10−3−2**
Buffalo	3−0	1–2	2−0−1	3−0	3−0	**12−2−1**
Hartford	0−2–1	1–2	2–1	0–3	0–2–1	**3–10–2**
Montreal	2−1	1−2	1−2	1–2	1−1−1	**6−8−1**
Quebec	2−1	0−3	3−0	1−2	1−2	**7−8−0**

== Schedule and results ==
1983–84 regular season
October

Game	Result	Date	Score	Opponent	Record
1	W	October 5, 1983	5–3	Hartford Whalers (1983–84)	1–0–0
2	L	October 8, 1983	2–9	@ Quebec Nordiques (1983–84)	1–1–0
3	W	October 9, 1983	5–2	Washington Capitals (1983–84)	2–1–0
4	T	October 12, 1983	4–4 OT	@ Toronto Maple Leafs (1983–84)	2–1–1
5	L	October 15, 1983	3–5	@ Boston Bruins (1983–84)	2–2–1
6	L	October 16, 1983	2–3	New York Islanders (1983–84)	2–3–1
7	W	October 18, 1983	3–1	@ Pittsburgh Penguins (1983–84)	3–3–1
8	W	October 22, 1983	5–2	@ Hartford Whalers (1983–84)	4–3–1
9	W	October 23, 1983	5–2	Winnipeg Jets (1983–84)	5–3–1
10	L	October 26, 1983	5–6 OT	@ Detroit Red Wings (1983–84)	5–4–1
11	T	October 28, 1983	3–3 OT	Los Angeles Kings (1983–84)	5–4–2
12	W	October 30, 1983	5–4	Montreal Canadiens (1983–84)	6–4–2

November

Game	Result	Date	Score	Opponent	Record
13	T	November 2, 1983	3–3 OT	New York Rangers (1983–84)	6–4–3
14	L	November 5, 1983	0–4	@ New York Islanders (1983–84)	6–5–3
15	L	November 6, 1983	1–7	Quebec Nordiques (1983–84)	6–6–3
16	W	November 9, 1983	3–1	Boston Bruins (1983–84)	7–6–3
17	W	November 11, 1983	3–1	Toronto Maple Leafs (1983–84)	8–6–3
18	W	November 13, 1983	11–2	Calgary Flames (1983–84)	9–6–3
19	W	November 16, 1983	6–5 OT	@ Winnipeg Jets (1983–84)	10–6–3
20	L	November 18, 1983	0–7	@ Edmonton Oilers (1983–84)	10–7–3
21	W	November 19, 1983	5–2	@ Calgary Flames (1983–84)	11–7–3
22	W	November 23, 1983	6–4	@ New York Rangers (1983–84)	12–7–3
23	W	November 25, 1983	5–2	Chicago Black Hawks (1983–84)	13–7–3
24	L	November 26, 1983	2–3	@ Quebec Nordiques (1983–84)	13–8–3
25	W	November 29, 1983	5–2	@ Montreal Canadiens (1983–84)	14–8–3

December

Game	Result	Date	Score	Opponent	Record
26	W	December 2, 1983	7–6	St. Louis Blues (1983–84)	15–8–3
27	W	December 4, 1983	6–2	Montreal Canadiens (1983–84)	16–8–3
28	L	December 6, 1983	2–8	@ St. Louis Blues (1983–84)	16–9–3
29	L	December 7, 1983	2–4	@ Chicago Black Hawks (1983–84)	16–10–3
30	W	December 10, 1983	4–2	@ Boston Bruins (1983–84)	17–10–3
31	W	December 11, 1983	6–5	@ Philadelphia Flyers (1983–84)	18–10–3
32	T	December 14, 1983	3–3 OT	New Jersey Devils (1983–84)	18–10–4
33	W	December 17, 1983	4–1	@ Hartford Whalers (1983–84)	19–10–4
34	W	December 18, 1983	3–2	Vancouver Canucks (1983–84)	20–10–4
35	L	December 21, 1983	3–6	Hartford Whalers (1983–84)	20–11–4
36	L	December 26, 1983	1–2	Boston Bruins (1983–84)	20–12–4
37	W	December 27, 1983	7–4	@ Montreal Canadiens (1983–84)	21–12–4
38	W	December 29, 1983	8–5	Quebec Nordiques (1983–84)	22–12–4
39	L	December 31, 1983	2–3	New York Rangers (1983–84)	22–13–4

January

Game	Result	Date	Score	Opponent	Record
40	W	January 4, 1984	9–4	Winnipeg Jets (1983–84)	23–13–4
41	W	January 7, 1984	4–2	@ Washington Capitals (1983–84)	24–13–4
42	W	January 8, 1984	4–3	Montreal Canadiens (1983–84)	25–13–4
43	W	January 11, 1984	6–2	Philadelphia Flyers (1983–84)	26–13–4
44	W	January 13, 1984	3–1	Edmonton Oilers (1983–84)	27–13–4
45	W	January 14, 1984	2–1	@ Detroit Red Wings (1983–84)	28–13–4
46	W	January 17, 1984	5–1	@ Vancouver Canucks (1983–84)	29–13–4
47	W	January 18, 1984	4–0	@ Los Angeles Kings (1983–84)	30–13–4
48	W	January 21, 1984	2–1	@ St. Louis Blues (1983–84)	31–13–4
49	W	January 23, 1984	5–3	@ Boston Bruins (1983–84)	32–13–4
50	T	January 25, 1984	2–2 OT	Washington Capitals (1983–84)	32–13–5
51	T	January 27, 1984	2–2 OT	Detroit Red Wings (1983–84)	32–13–6
52	W	January 29, 1984	7–3	Pittsburgh Penguins (1983–84)	33–13–6

February

Game	Result	Date	Score	Opponent	Record
53	L	February 2, 1984	3–5	@ Boston Bruins (1983–84)	33–14–6
54	L	February 3, 1984	1–4	Minnesota North Stars (1983–84)	33–15–6
55	L	February 5, 1984	1–2	Quebec Nordiques (1983–84)	33–16–6
56	W	February 8, 1984	6–5 OT	@ Pittsburgh Penguins (1983–84)	34–16–6
57	W	February 9, 1984	8–5	New Jersey Devils (1983–84)	35–16–6
58	W	February 11, 1984	4–3	@ Montreal Canadiens (1983–84)	36–16–6
59	W	February 15, 1984	7–4	Boston Bruins (1983–84)	37–16–6
60	W	February 17, 1984	5–4 OT	Minnesota North Stars (1983–84)	38–16–6
61	W	February 19, 1984	5–2	Hartford Whalers (1983–84)	39–16–6
62	W	February 21, 1984	5–4 OT	@ Philadelphia Flyers (1983–84)	40–16–6
63	L	February 23, 1984	2–3	@ Hartford Whalers (1983–84)	40–17–6
64	L	February 25, 1984	1–5	@ Minnesota North Stars (1983–84)	40–18–6
65	L	February 27, 1984	1–3	Boston Bruins (1983–84)	40–19–6
66	L	February 29, 1984	3–4	@ Chicago Black Hawks (1983–84)	40–20–6

March

Game	Result	Date	Score	Opponent	Record
67	L	March 3, 1984	2–4	@ Quebec Nordiques (1983–84)	40–21–6
68	T	March 4, 1984	1–1 OT	Quebec Nordiques (1983–84)	40–21–7
69	W	March 6, 1984	8–3	@ Montreal Canadiens (1983–84)	41–21–7
70	W	March 9, 1984	7–3	Los Angeles Kings (1983–84)	42–21–7
71	W	March 11, 1984	4–3 OT	Hartford Whalers (1983–84)	43–21–7
72	W	March 14, 1984	4–2	@ Calgary Flames (1983–84)	44–21–7
73	W	March 17, 1984	5–2	@ Vancouver Canucks (1983–84)	45–21–7
74	L	March 18, 1984	3–4	@ Edmonton Oilers (1983–84)	45–22–7
75	W	March 21, 1984	4–2	Montreal Canadiens (1983–84)	46–22–7
76	W	March 24, 1984	6–0	@ New Jersey Devils (1983–84)	47–22–7
77	L	March 25, 1984	3–5	New York Islanders (1983–84)	47–23–7
78	L	March 27, 1984	1–4	@ Hartford Whalers (1983–84)	47–24–7
79	L	March 31, 1984	1–4	@ Quebec Nordiques (1983–84)	47–25–7

April

Game	Result	Date	Score	Opponent	Record
80	W	April 1, 1984	4–2	Toronto Maple Leafs (1983–84)	48–25–7

Legend: Win (2 points) Loss (0 points) Tie (1 point)

== Playoffs ==
The Sabres qualified for the playoffs and lost to the Quebec Nordiques 3 games to 0, in the Adams Division Semifinals.

== Awards and records ==
- Tom Barrasso, Calder Memorial Trophy
- Tom Barrasso, Vezina Trophy
- Tom Barrasso, Goaltender, NHL First Team All-Star
