= Gary Sampson (ice hockey) =

American ice hockey player

- Born: August 24, 1959 (age 65); Atikokan, Ontario, Canada
- Height: 6 ft 0 in (183 cm)
- Weight: 190 lb (86 kg; 13 st 8 lb)
- Position: Left wing
- Shot: Left
- Played for: Washington Capitals
- National team: United States
- NHL draft: Undrafted
- Playing career: 1983–1987

Gary Edward Sampson (born August 24, 1959) is an American ice hockey player. He played 105 games in the National Hockey League with the Washington Capitals from 1984 to 1987. Internationally Sampson played for the American national team at the 1984 Winter Olympics and the 1983 World Championships.

== Playing career ==
Sampson played college hockey at Boston College and was part of the American national team that played in the 1984 Winter Olympic Games.

Sampson signed with the Washington Capitals following the Olympics and scored his first NHL goal in a 5–1 win over the Minnesota North Stars on March 21, 1984. He played parts of four seasons with the Capitals until he retired during the 1987–88 season due to injuries.

== Personal life ==
Sampson was born in Atikokan, Ontario and raised in International Falls, Minnesota. He resides in Alaska with his wife Jeanne where he runs the Kodiak Sportsman's Lodge.

== Career statistics ==
=== Regular season and playoffs ===
			Regular season					Playoffs
Season	Team	League	GP	G	A	Pts	PIM	GP	G	A	Pts	PIM
1977–78	Falls High School	HS-MN	—	—	—	—	—	—	—	—	—	—
1978–79	Boston College	ECAC	30	10	18	28	4	—	—	—	—	—
1979–80	Boston College	ECAC	24	6	18	24	8	—	—	—	—	—
1980–81	Boston College	ECAC	31	8	16	24	8	—	—	—	—	—
1981–82	Boston College	ECAC	21	7	11	18	22	—	—	—	—	—
1982–83	United States National Team	Intl	40	11	20	31	8	—	—	—	—	—
1983–84	United States National Team	Intl	57	21	18	39	10	—	—	—	—	—
1983–84	Washington Capitals	NHL	15	1	1	2	6	8	1	0	1	0
1984–85	Washington Capitals	NHL	46	10	15	25	13	4	0	0	0	0
1984–85	Binghamton Whalers	AHL	5	2	2	4	2	—	—	—	—	—
1985–86	Washington Capitals	NHL	19	1	4	5	2	—	—	—	—	—
1985–86	Binghamton Whalers	AHL	49	9	21	30	16	6	2	2	4	4
1986–87	Washington Capitals	NHL	25	1	2	3	4	—	—	—	—	—
1986–87	Binghamton Whalers	AHL	37	12	16	28	10	11	4	2	6	0
1987–88	Baltimore Skipjacks	AHL	16	2	4	6	4	—	—	—	—	—
AHL totals			107	25	43	68	32	17	6	4	10	4
NHL totals			105	13	22	35	25	12	1	0	1	0

=== International ===
Year	Team	Event	GP	G	A	Pts	PIM
1983	United States	WC B	7	2	2	4	—
1984	United States	OLY	6	1	2	3	2
Senior totals			13	3	4	7	—
