= Rick Heinz =

Canadian ice hockey player

- Born: May 30, 1955 (age 71) Essex, Ontario, Canada
- Height: 5 ft 10 in (178 cm)
- Weight: 165 lb (75 kg; 11 st 11 lb)
- Position: Goaltender
- Caught: Left
- Played for: St. Louis Blues; Vancouver Canucks
- NHL draft: Undrafted
- Playing career: 1978–1987

Richard D. Heinz (born May 30, 1955) is a Canadian former professional ice hockey player who played 49 games in the National Hockey League. He played with the St. Louis Blues and Vancouver Canucks. The rest of his career was spent in the minor leagues, primarily with the Salt Lake Golden Eagles in the Central Hockey League and International Hockey League where he won three league championships with Salt Lake. Rick spent several years running and teaching at his Rick Heinz Hockey Schools throughout the U.S. and Canada.

== Career statistics ==
=== Regular season and playoffs ===
			Regular season									Playoffs
Season	Team	League	GP	W	L	T	MIN	GA	SO	GAA	SV%	GP	W	L	MIN	GA	SO	GAA	SV%
1974–75	University of Minnesota-Duluth	WCHA	20	6	11	2	1187	94	0	4.75	.875	—	—	—	—	—	—	—	—
1975–76	University of Minnesota-Duluth	WCHA	34	14	20	0	2029	162	0	4.79	.886	—	—	—	—	—	—	—	—
1976–77	University of Minnesota-Duluth	WCHA	23	6	15	2	1332	123	0	5.54	.869	—	—	—	—	—	—	—	—
1977–78	University of Minnesota-Duluth	WCHA	33	13	18	1	1961	157	0	4.80	.881	2	0	1	69	7	0	6.07	—
1978–79	Port Huron Flags	IHL	54	—	—	—	2800	157	5	3.36	—	6	—	—	281	18	1	3.84	—
1978–79	Salt Lake Golden Eagles	CHL	1	0	1	0	59	3	0	3.05	.894	—	—	—	—	—	—	—	—
1979–80	Salt Lake Golden Eagles	CHL	39	22	11	5	2353	119	0	3.03	.903	5	1	3	324	16	0	2.96	—
1980–81	St. Louis Blues	NHL	4	2	1	1	219	8	0	2.19	.922	—	—	—	—	—	—	—	—
1980–81	Salt Lake Golden Eagles	CHL	36	19	14	3	2210	128	3	3.48	—	14	10	4	859	39	0	2.72	—
1981–82	St. Louis Blues	NHL	9	2	5	0	431	35	0	4.87	.829	—	—	—	—	—	—	—	—
1981–82	Vancouver Canucks	NHL	3	2	1	0	180	9	1	3.00	.883	—	—	—	—	—	—	—	—
1982–83	St. Louis Blues	NHL	9	1	5	1	332	24	1	4.33	.850	—	—	—	—	—	—	—	—
1982–83	Salt Lake Golden Eagles	CHL	17	9	8	0	1031	58	1	3.38	—	—	—	—	—	—	—	—	—
1983–84	St. Louis Blues	NHL	22	7	7	3	1115	80	0	4.30	.852	1	0	0	8	1	0	7.93	.500
1984–85	St. Louis Blues	NHL	2	0	0	0	70	3	0	2.56	.885	—	—	—	—	—	—	—	—
1984–85	Peoria Rivermen	IHL	43	24	12	4	2443	129	2	3.17	—	10	6	4	607	31	1	3.06	—
1985–86	Binghamton Whalers	AHL	1	0	1	0	60	9	0	9.00	—	—	—	—	—	—	—	—	—
1985–86	Salt Lake Golden Eagles	IHL	52	22	20	0	3000	185	1	3.70	—	5	1	4	299	26	0	5.22	—
1986–87	Salt Lake Golden Eagles	IHL	51	29	20	0	3026	201	1	3.99	—	16	12	4	912	57	0	3.75	—
NHL totals			49	14	19	5	2349	159	2	4.06	.857	1	0	0	8	1	0	7.93	.500
