= Mark Renaud =

Canadian ice hockey player

- Born: February 21, 1959 (age 67) Windsor, Ontario, Canada
- Height: 6 ft 0 in (183 cm)
- Weight: 185 lb (84 kg; 13 st 3 lb)
- Position: Defence
- Shot: Left
- Played for: Hartford Whalers; Buffalo Sabres
- NHL draft: 102nd overall, 1979; Hartford Whalers
- Playing career: 1979–1985

Mark Joseph Renaud (born February 21, 1959) is a Canadian former professional ice hockey defenceman. He was drafted in the fifth round, 102nd overall, by the Hartford Whalers in the 1979 NHL entry draft. He played in the National Hockey League with Hartford and the Buffalo Sabres.

Renaud was born in Windsor, Ontario. In his NHL career, Renaud appeared in 152 games scoring six goals and adding 50 assists.

Mark's son Mickey (1988-2008), was the captain of the OHL's Windsor Spitfires and a Calgary Flames draft pick in the 2007 NHL Entry Draft. Since 2009, the OHL has presented a yearly award to the OHL captain who best exemplifies the qualities of leadership and work ethic while having fun in the game of hockey, that Mickey possessed.

== Career statistics ==
=== Regular season and playoffs ===
			Regular season					Playoffs
Season	Team	League	GP	G	A	Pts	PIM	GP	G	A	Pts	PIM
1975–76	Windsor Spitfires	OMJHL	66	3	15	18	42	—	—	—	—	—
1976–77	Niagara Falls Flyers	OMJHL	66	7	25	32	30	—	—	—	—	—
1977–78	Niagara Falls Flyers	OMJHL	68	6	24	30	57	—	—	—	—	—
1978–79	Niagara Falls Flyers	OMJHL	68	6	24	30	57	20	4	17	21	30
1979–80	Hartford Whalers	NHL	13	0	2	2	4	—	—	—	—	—
1979–80	Springfield Indians	AHL	61	3	16	19	39	—	—	—	—	—
1980–81	Hartford Whalers	NHL	4	1	0	1	0	—	—	—	—	—
1980–81	Binghamton Whalers	AHL	73	6	44	50	56	6	0	2	2	2
1981–82	Hartford Whalers	NHL	48	1	17	18	39	—	—	—	—	—
1981–82	Binghamton Whalers	AHL	33	3	19	22	70	—	—	—	—	—
1982–83	Hartford Whalers	NHL	77	3	28	31	37	—	—	—	—	—
1983–84	Buffalo Sabres	NHL	10	1	3	4	6	—	—	—	—	—
1983–84	Rochester Americans	AHL	64	9	33	42	52	15	2	8	10	39
1984–85	Rochester Americans	AHL	80	8	34	42	56	5	0	0	0	2
AHL totals			311	29	146	175	273	26	2	10	12	43
NHL totals			152	6	50	56	86	—	—	—	—	—
