= Andre Hidi =

Canadian ice hockey player (born 1960)

- Born: June 5, 1960 (age 64); Toronto, Ontario, Canada
- Height: 6 ft 2 in (188 cm)
- Weight: 205 lb (93 kg; 14 st 9 lb)
- Position: Left wing
- Shot: Left
- Played for: Washington Capitals
- NHL draft: 148th overall, 1980; Colorado Rockies
- Playing career: 1984–1986

André Lawrence Hidi (born June 5, 1960) is a Canadian former ice hockey player. Hidi played seven games with the Washington Capitals.

== Biography ==
Hidi was born in Toronto, Ontario. As a youth, he played in the 1973 Quebec International Pee-Wee Hockey Tournament with a minor ice hockey team from Toronto. Hidi played junior hockey with the Peterborough Petes to 1981.

Hidi then attended the University of Toronto. He played for the university's Toronto Varsity Blues from 1980–81 to 1983–84; the Varsity Blues won the national CIAU University Cup championship in 1984, with Hidi winning the Major W.J. "Danny" McLeod Award as Most Valuable Player of the national championship tournament.

He was drafted by the Colorado Rockies in 1980. He was signed as a free agent in March 1984 by the Washington Capitals. He would play seven games in the NHL and 121 in the American Hockey League with the Binghamton Whalers. During his seven total career games with the Capitals, Hidi scored 2 goals and 1 assist while receiving 9 penalty minutes.

In 2014, Hidi was inducted into the University of Toronto Hall of Fame.

As of 2018, Hidi is the Head of Mergers and Acquisitions at BMO Capital Markets.

== Career statistics ==
			Regular season					Playoffs
Season	Team	League	GP	G	A	Pts	PIM	GP	G	A	Pts	PIM
1978–79	Dixie Beehives	OHA-B	19	15	16	31	19	—	—	—	—	—
1979–80	Peterborough Petes	OMJHL	68	30	35	65	49	14	4	8	12	31
1980–81	University of Toronto	CIAU	22	12	13	25	32	—	—	—	—	—
1980–81	Peterborough Petes	OHL	3	1	1	2	2	5	2	3	5	11
1981–82	University of Toronto	CIAU	22	26	26	52	52	—	—	—	—	—
1982–83	University of Toronto	CIAU	24	23	29	52	50	—	—	—	—	—
1983–84	University of Toronto	CIAU	24	30	30	60	66	—	—	—	—	—
1983–84	Washington Capitals	NHL	1	0	0	0	0	2	0	0	0	0
1984–85	Washington Capitals	NHL	6	2	1	3	9	—	—	—	—	—
1984–85	Binghamton Whalers	AHL	55	12	17	29	57	3	0	1	1	5
1985–86	Binghamton Whalers	AHL	66	19	24	43	104	6	1	4	5	13
NHL totals			7	2	1	3	9	2	0	0	0	0
AHL totals			121	31	41	72	161	9	1	5	6	18
