= 1983–84 Chicago Black Hawks season =

National Hockey League team season

1983–84 Chicago Black Hawks
- Division: 4th Norris
- Conference: 8th Campbell
- 1983–84 record: 30–42–8
- Home record: 25–13–2
- Road record: 5–29–6
- Goals for: 277
- Goals against: 311

Team information
- General manager: Bob Pulford
- Coach: Orval Tessier
- Captain: Darryl Sutter
- Alternate captains: None
- Arena: Chicago Stadium

Team leaders
- Goals: Denis Savard 37
- Assists: Denis Savard 57
- Points: Denis Savard 94
- Penalty minutes: Behn Wilson 143
- Plus/minus: Troy Murray +10
- Wins: Murray Bannerman 23
- Goals against average: Murray Bannerman 3.38

The 1983–84 Chicago Black Hawks season was the 58th season of operation of the Chicago Black Hawks in the National Hockey League (NHL).

== Off-season ==
The Black Hawks had a fairly quiet off-season, however, the club did complete a trade with the Philadelphia Flyers, sending defenseman Doug Crossman and their second-round draft pick in the 1984 NHL entry draft to the Flyers in exchange for defenseman Behn Wilson. Wilson had spent his entire five-year career with Philadelphia, and in the 1982–83 season had 8 goals and 32 points in 62 games, as well as 92 penalty minutes.

At the 1983 NHL entry draft, Chicago selected defenseman Bruce Cassidy from the Ottawa 67's of the Ontario Hockey League (OHL) with their first-round draft pick. Cassidy appeared in 70 games with the 67's, scoring 25 goals and 111 points. In the tenth round of the draft, the club selected goaltender and future Hockey Hall of Fameer Dominik Hasek.

== Regular season ==
The Black Hawks got off to a solid start, going 7–3–0 in their first ten games. However, Chicago would win one of their next seven games to fall below the .500 mark with an 8–9–0 record. The Hawks continued to struggle, as they team had trouble scoring goals, as they limped their way to a 30–42–8 record, earning 68 points and the fourth and final playoff position in the Norris Division, seven points ahead of the fifth-placed Toronto Maple Leafs. Chicago's point total was 36 fewer than the previous season, and the 271 goals that they scored ranked them 19th, 3rd worst in the NHL.

Denis Savard led the club with 37 goals, a career-high. However, his 94-points total was a 27-point drop off from the previous season. Steve Larmer had 35 goals and 75 points while appearing in all 80 games. Doug Wilson led the Black Hawks defence, scoring 13 goals and 58 points, and Bob Murray had 11 goals and 48 points. Behn Wilson led the team with 143 penalty minutes.

In goal, Murray Bannerman became the number one goalie, going 23–29–4 with a 3.38 goals against average (GAA) and a .887 save percentage in 56 games. Tony Esposito became the backup, as he had a 5–10–3 record with a 4.82 GAA and a .859 save percentage in 18 games.

=== Final standings ===
Norris Division
	GP	W	L	T	GF	GA	Pts
**Minnesota North Stars**	80	39	31	10	345	344	88
**St. Louis Blues**	80	32	41	7	293	316	71
**Detroit Red Wings**	80	31	42	7	298	323	69
**Chicago Black Hawks**	80	30	42	8	277	311	68
Toronto Maple Leafs	80	26	45	9	303	387	61

Note: GP = Games played, W = Wins, L = Losses, T = Ties, Pts = Points, GF = Goals for, GA = Goals against
Note: Teams that qualified for the playoffs are highlighted in bold.

=== Record vs. opponents ===
Norris Division record vs. opponents

==== Vs. Campbell Conference ====
**Vs. Norris Division**

1983–84 NHL records
Team	**CHI**	**DET**	**MIN**	**STL**	**TOR**	**Total**
Chicago	—	4−4	2−6	4−3−1	5−2−1	**15−15−2**
Detroit	4−4	—	2−6	5−3	3−5	**14−18−0**
Minnesota	6−2	6−2	—	5−2−1	5−2−1	**22−8−2**
St. Louis	3−4−1	3−5	2−5−1	—	6−2	**14−16−2**
Toronto	2−5−1	5−3	2−5−1	2−6	—	**11−19−2**

**Vs. Smythe Division**

1983–84 NHL records
Team	**CGY**	**EDM**	**LAK**	**VAN**	**WIN**	**Total**
Chicago	1−2	1−2	0−3	2−1	1−2	**5−10−0**
Detroit	2−1	0−3	0−2−1	1−2	1−0−2	**4−8−3**
Minnesota	1−2	0−2−1	1−1−1	1−1−1	2−1	**5−7−3**
St. Louis	0−2−1	2−1	1−1−1	2−1	1−2	**6−7−2**
Toronto	0−1−2	1−2	2−0−1	0−1−2	0−3	**3−7−5**

==== Vs. Wales Conference ====
**Vs. Adams Division**

1983–84 NHL records
Team	**BOS**	**BUF**	**HFD**	**MTL**	**QUE**	**Total**
Chicago	2−1	2−1	1−2	0−2−1	1−1−1	**6−7−2**
Detroit	1−2	1−1−1	1−1−1	0−3	2−1	**5−8−2**
Minnesota	2−1	2−1	0−3	2−1	0−2−1	**6−8−1**
St. Louis	0−3	1−2	1−2	0−3	0−2−1	**2−12−1**
Toronto	2−1	0−2−1	1−2	1−2	1−2	**5−9−1**

**Vs. Patrick Division**

1983–84 NHL records
Team	**NJD**	**NYI**	**NYR**	**PHI**	**PIT**	**WSH**	**Total**
Chicago	1−2	0−3	1−2	0−1−2	1−1−1	1−1−1	**4−10−4**
Detroit	1−2	2−1	0−3	0−1−2	3−0	2−1	**8−8−2**
Minnesota	2−1	0−2−1	1−1−1	1−0−2	2−1	0−3	**6−8−4**
St. Louis	3−0	1−1−1	1−2	2−1	2−0−1	1−2	**10−6−2**
Toronto	3−0	1−2	2−1	0−3	1−1−1	0−3	**7−10−1**

== Schedule and results ==
1983–84 regular season
October

Game	Result	Date	Score	Opponent	Record
1	W	October 5, 1983	4–3	St. Louis Blues (1983–84)	1–0–0
2	L	October 8, 1983	1–4	@ St. Louis Blues (1983–84)	1–1–0
3	W	October 9, 1983	6–4	Detroit Red Wings (1983–84)	2–1–0
4	W	October 12, 1983	2–1	Vancouver Canucks (1983–84)	3–1–0
5	L	October 15, 1983	8–10	@ Toronto Maple Leafs (1983–84)	3–2–0
6	W	October 16, 1983	4–3	Minnesota North Stars (1983–84)	4–2–0
7	W	October 19, 1983	6–3	New Jersey Devils (1983–84)	5–2–0
8	L	October 22, 1983	1–2	@ St. Louis Blues (1983–84)	5–3–0
9	W	October 23, 1983	7–4	Calgary Flames (1983–84)	6–3–0
10	W	October 25, 1983	5–1	Boston Bruins (1983–84)	7–3–0
11	L	October 27, 1983	2–4	Pittsburgh Penguins (1983–84)	7–4–0
12	W	October 30, 1983	6–1	Hartford Whalers (1983–84)	8–4–0

November

Game	Result	Date	Score	Opponent	Record
13	L	November 3, 1983	4–7	@ Detroit Red Wings (1983–84)	8–5–0
14	L	November 5, 1983	5–10	@ Minnesota North Stars (1983–84)	8–6–0
15	L	November 6, 1983	3–6	@ New Jersey Devils (1983–84)	8–7–0
16	L	November 9, 1983	0–3	Montreal Canadiens (1983–84)	8–8–0
17	L	November 12, 1983	1–6	@ Hartford Whalers (1983–84)	8–9–0
18	W	November 13, 1983	5–3	Edmonton Oilers (1983–84)	9–9–0
19	W	November 16, 1983	4–3	St. Louis Blues (1983–84)	10–9–0
20	T	November 19, 1983	5–5 OT	@ Montreal Canadiens (1983–84)	10–9–1
21	L	November 20, 1983	3–4	Minnesota North Stars (1983–84)	10–10–1
22	T	November 23, 1983	2–2 OT	@ Washington Capitals (1983–84)	10–10–2
23	L	November 25, 1983	2–5	@ Buffalo Sabres (1983–84)	10–11–2
24	L	November 26, 1983	3–9	@ New York Islanders (1983–84)	10–12–2
25	L	November 29, 1983	2–3	@ New Jersey Devils (1983–84)	10–13–2
26	W	November 30, 1983	4–0	@ New York Rangers (1983–84)	11–13–2

December

Game	Result	Date	Score	Opponent	Record
27	L	December 3, 1983	2–3	@ Quebec Nordiques (1983–84)	11–14–2
28	W	December 7, 1983	4–2	Buffalo Sabres (1983–84)	12–14–2
29	L	December 8, 1983	2–3	@ Philadelphia Flyers (1983–84)	12–15–2
30	W	December 11, 1983	4–2	Detroit Red Wings (1983–84)	13–15–2
31	L	December 13, 1983	1–4	@ St. Louis Blues (1983–84)	13–16–2
32	L	December 14, 1983	5–6	Los Angeles Kings (1983–84)	13–17–2
33	W	December 17, 1983	5–2	@ Boston Bruins (1983–84)	14–17–2
34	L	December 18, 1983	1–5	Boston Bruins (1983–84)	14–18–2
35	T	December 21, 1983	3–3 OT	Philadelphia Flyers (1983–84)	14–18–3
36	L	December 23, 1983	2–3	@ New York Rangers (1983–84)	14–19–3
37	W	December 26, 1983	3–1	St. Louis Blues (1983–84)	15–19–3
38	L	December 28, 1983	4–7	New York Rangers (1983–84)	15–20–3
39	L	December 31, 1983	3–4	@ Detroit Red Wings (1983–84)	15–21–3

January

Game	Result	Date	Score	Opponent	Record
40	L	January 2, 1984	5–6	@ Minnesota North Stars (1983–84)	15–22–3
41	W	January 4, 1984	5–1	Toronto Maple Leafs (1983–84)	16–22–3
42	L	January 7, 1984	3–5	@ New York Islanders (1983–84)	16–23–3
43	W	January 8, 1984	2–0	Vancouver Canucks (1983–84)	17–23–3
44	L	January 11, 1984	3–5	Edmonton Oilers (1983–84)	17–24–3
45	T	January 14, 1984	2–2 OT	@ Toronto Maple Leafs (1983–84)	17–24–4
46	W	January 15, 1984	2–0	Pittsburgh Penguins (1983–84)	18–24–4
47	L	January 18, 1984	1–9	New York Islanders (1983–84)	18–25–4
48	L	January 20, 1984	3–5	@ Washington Capitals (1983–84)	18–26–4
49	T	January 21, 1984	4–4 OT	@ Quebec Nordiques (1983–84)	18–26–5
50	W	January 23, 1984	6–2	@ Toronto Maple Leafs (1983–84)	19–26–5
51	L	January 25, 1984	3–5	Minnesota North Stars (1983–84)	19–27–5
52	W	January 28, 1984	4–2	@ Minnesota North Stars (1983–84)	20–27–5
53	T	January 29, 1984	5–5 OT	Philadelphia Flyers (1983–84)	20–27–6

February

Game	Result	Date	Score	Opponent	Record
54	W	February 1, 1984	7–2	Toronto Maple Leafs (1983–84)	21–27–6
55	L	February 3, 1984	3–7	@ Winnipeg Jets (1983–84)	21–28–6
56	L	February 5, 1984	3–4	Hartford Whalers (1983–84)	21–29–6
57	L	February 8, 1984	0–1	@ Los Angeles Kings (1983–84)	21–30–6
58	T	February 11, 1984	1–1 OT	@ St. Louis Blues (1983–84)	21–30–7
59	L	February 12, 1984	4–6	Calgary Flames (1983–84)	21–31–7
60	W	February 15, 1984	5–2	Quebec Nordiques (1983–84)	22–31–7
61	L	February 18, 1984	0–6	@ Detroit Red Wings (1983–84)	22–32–7
62	W	February 19, 1984	6–5	St. Louis Blues (1983–84)	23–32–7
63	W	February 22, 1984	4–2	Washington Capitals (1983–84)	24–32–7
64	T	February 25, 1984	3–3 OT	@ Pittsburgh Penguins (1983–84)	24–32–8
65	L	February 26, 1984	2–4	Detroit Red Wings (1983–84)	24–33–8
66	W	February 29, 1984	4–3	Buffalo Sabres (1983–84)	25–33–8

March

Game	Result	Date	Score	Opponent	Record
67	L	March 3, 1984	3–6	@ Minnesota North Stars (1983–84)	25–34–8
68	W	March 4, 1984	5–4	Toronto Maple Leafs (1983–84)	26–34–8
69	L	March 7, 1984	4–7	@ Edmonton Oilers (1983–84)	26–35–8
70	L	March 9, 1984	3–4 OT	@ Vancouver Canucks (1983–84)	26–36–8
71	L	March 11, 1984	3–4	@ Los Angeles Kings (1983–84)	26–37–8
72	L	March 14, 1984	4–6	@ Winnipeg Jets (1983–84)	26–38–8
73	L	March 16, 1984	5–6	@ Calgary Flames (1983–84)	26–39–8
74	L	March 19, 1984	1–2	@ Montreal Canadiens (1983–84)	26–40–8
75	W	March 21, 1984	6–2	Winnipeg Jets (1983–84)	27–40–8
76	L	March 24, 1984	3–7	@ Toronto Maple Leafs (1983–84)	27–41–8
77	W	March 25, 1984	5–4	Toronto Maple Leafs (1983–84)	28–41–8
78	L	March 28, 1984	3–6	Minnesota North Stars (1983–84)	28–42–8
79	W	March 31, 1984	4–2	@ Detroit Red Wings (1983–84)	29–42–8

April

Game	Result	Date	Score	Opponent	Record
80	W	April 1, 1984	4–3	Detroit Red Wings (1983–84)	30–42–8

Legend: Win (2 points) Loss (0 points) Tie (1 point)

== Playoffs ==
=== Minnesota North Stars 3, Chicago Black Hawks 2 ===
The Black Hawks opened the playoffs with a best-of-five Norris Division semi-final series against the Minnesota North Stars, who finished the season with the best record in the division at 39–31–10, earning 88 points, which was 20 more than the Black Hawks. Chicago had eliminated the North Stars from the playoffs during the previous two seasons, in 1982 and 1983. The series opened with two games at the Met Center in Bloomington, Minnesota, and Hawks, led by two third period goals by Al Secord and 34 saves by Murray Bannerman stunned the North Stars and took the first game by a 3–1 score. Despite heavily outshooting and outplaying the Black Hawks in the second game, Minnesota and Chicago were tied at three after two periods. In the third period, the North Stars put the game away, scoring three times, en route to a 6–5 win and tying the series at 1-1. The series shifted to Chicago Stadium for the next two games, and the North Stars easily handed the Black Hawks a 4–1 loss in the third game to take the series lead. In the fourth game, Chicago's Troy Murray scored a late third period goal, helping the Hawks to a 4–3 victory, and force a fifth and deciding game back in Minnesota. In the fifth game, the North Stars Dennis Maruk led the way with two goals, as Minnesota defeated Chicago 4-1 and eliminated the Black Hawks.

1984 Stanley Cup playoffs
Norris Division Semifinals vs. (N1) Minnesota North Stars – North Stars win 3–2

Game	Date	Visitor	Score	Home	Series
1	April 4	Chicago Black Hawks	3–1	Minnesota North Stars	1–0
2	April 5	Chicago Black Hawks	5–6	Minnesota North Stars	1–1
3	April 7	Minnesota North Stars	4–1	Chicago Black Hawks	1–2
4	April 8	Minnesota North Stars	3–4	Chicago Black Hawks	2–2
5	April 10	Chicago Black Hawks	1–4	Minnesota North Stars	2–3

Legend: Win Loss

== Player statistics ==
=== Regular season ===
Scoring

Player	Pos	GP	G	A	Pts	PIM	+/-	PPG	SHG	GWG
Denis Savard	C	75	37	57	94	71	-13	12	0	5
Steve Larmer	RW	80	35	40	75	34	-1	13	0	3
Doug Wilson	D	66	13	45	58	64	-11	4	1	1
Bill Gardner	C	79	27	21	48	12	1	3	3	3
Bob Murray	D	78	11	37	48	78	1	3	1	1
Tom Lysiak	C	54	17	30	47	35	-13	5	1	2
Darryl Sutter	LW	59	20	20	40	44	-18	8	0	4
Keith Brown	D	74	10	25	35	94	-18	3	0	0
Behn Wilson	D	59	10	22	32	143	-5	3	0	1
Troy Murray	C	61	15	15	30	45	10	0	1	2
Steve Ludzik	C	80	9	20	29	73	-5	0	0	0
Rich Preston	RW	75	10	18	28	50	-21	3	1	1
Denis Cyr	RW	46	12	13	25	19	0	6	0	1
Jeff Larmer	LW	36	9	13	22	20	3	2	0	1
Curt Fraser	LW	29	5	12	17	28	9	1	0	0
Jack O'Callahan	D	70	4	13	17	67	-6	0	0	1
Rick Paterson	C	72	7	6	13	41	-13	0	0	0
Dave Feamster	D	46	6	7	13	42	-8	0	0	0
Ken Yaremchuk	C	47	6	7	13	19	-7	0	0	0
Peter Marsh	RW	43	4	6	10	44	-11	0	0	0
Al Secord	LW	14	4	4	8	77	7	1	0	3
Tim Higgins	RW	32	1	4	5	21	1	0	0	1
Don Dietrich	D	17	0	5	5	0	-1	0	0	0
Greg Fox	D	24	0	5	5	31	0	0	0	0
Tom McMurchy	RW	27	3	1	4	42	-7	0	0	0
Jerome Dupont	D	36	2	2	4	116	-11	0	0	0
Murray Bannerman	G	56	0	4	4	17	0	0	0	0
Randy Boyd	D	23	0	4	4	16	0	0	0	0
Tony Esposito	G	18	0	3	3	0	0	0	0	0
Darrel Anholt	D	1	0	0	0	0	2	0	0	0
James Camazzola	LW	1	0	0	0	0	0	0	0	0
Bruce Cassidy	D	1	0	0	0	0	0	0	0	0
Dan Frawley	RW	3	0	0	0	0	-1	0	0	0
Bob Janecyk	G	8	0	0	0	2	0	0	0	0
Perry Pelensky	RW	4	0	0	0	5	0	0	0	0
Florent Robidoux	LW	9	0	0	0	0	-3	0	0	0

Goaltending

Player	MIN	GP	W	L	T	GA	GAA	SO
Murray Bannerman	3335	56	23	29	4	188	3.38	2
Tony Esposito	1095	18	5	10	3	88	4.82	1
Bob Janecyk	412	8	2	3	1	28	4.08	0
Team:	4842	80	30	42	8	304	3.77	3

=== Playoffs ===
Scoring

Player	Pos	GP	G	A	Pts	PIM	PPG	SHG	GWG
Al Secord	LW	5	3	4	7	28	0	0	1
Bob Murray	D	5	3	1	4	6	1	0	0
Steve Larmer	RW	5	2	2	4	7	1	0	0
Denis Savard	C	5	1	3	4	9	0	0	0
Doug Wilson	D	5	0	3	3	2	0	0	0
Tom Lysiak	C	5	1	1	2	2	0	0	0
Rick Paterson	C	5	1	1	2	6	0	1	0
Darryl Sutter	LW	5	1	1	2	0	0	0	0
Jeff Larmer	LW	5	1	0	1	2	1	0	0
Troy Murray	C	5	1	0	1	7	0	0	1
Murray Bannerman	G	5	0	1	1	5	0	0	0
Keith Brown	D	5	0	1	1	10	0	0	0
Dave Feamster	D	5	0	1	1	4	0	0	0
Bill Gardner	C	5	0	1	1	0	0	0	0
Steve Ludzik	C	4	0	1	1	9	0	0	0
Rich Preston	RW	5	0	1	1	4	0	0	0
Jerome Dupont	D	4	0	0	0	15	0	0	0
Curt Fraser	LW	5	0	0	0	14	0	0	0
Jack O'Callahan	D	2	0	0	0	2	0	0	0
Behn Wilson	D	4	0	0	0	0	0	0	0
Ken Yaremchuk	C	1	0	0	0	0	0	0	0

Goaltending

Player	MIN	GP	W	L	GA	GAA	SO
Murray Bannerman	300	5	2	3	17	3.40	0
Team:	300	5	2	3	17	3.40	0

Note: Pos = Position; GP = Games played; G = Goals; A = Assists; Pts = Points; +/- = plus/minus; PIM = Penalty minutes; PPG = Power-play goals; SHG = Short-handed goals; GWG = Game-winning goals
MIN = Minutes played; W = Wins; L = Losses; T = Ties; GA = Goals-against; GAA = Goals-against average; SO = Shutouts;

== Draft picks ==
Chicago's draft picks at the 1983 NHL entry draft held at the Montreal Forum in Montreal.

Round	#	Player	Nationality	College/Junior/Club team (League)
1	18	Bruce Cassidy	Canada	Ottawa 67's (OHL)
2	39	Wayne Presley	United States	Kitchener Rangers (OHL)
3	59	Marc Bergevin	Canada	Chicoutimi Saguenéens (QMJHL)
4	79	Tarek Howard	Canada	Olds Grizzlys (AJHL)
5	99	Kevin Robinson	Canada	Toronto Marlboros (OHL)
6	115	Jari Torkki	Finland	Rauma (Finland)
6	119	Mark LaVarre	United States	Stratford Cullitons (MWJBHL)
7	139	Scott Birnie	Canada	Cornwall Royals (OHL)
8	159	Kent Paynter	Canada	Kitchener Rangers (OHL)
9	179	Brian Noonan	United States	Archbishop Williams High School (USHS-MA)
10	199	Dominik Hašek	Czechoslovakia	HC Pardubice (Czechoslovakia)
11	219	Steve Pepin	Canada	Saint-Jean Castors (QMJHL)

== See also ==
- 1983–84 NHL season
