= 1983–84 Toronto Maple Leafs season =

NHL hockey team season

1983–84 Toronto Maple Leafs
- Division: 5th Norris
- Conference: 9th Campbell
- 1983–84 record: 26–45–9
- Home record: 17–16–7
- Road record: 9–29–2
- Goals for: 303
- Goals against: 387

Team information
- General manager: Gerry McNarama
- Coach: Mike Nykoluk
- Captain: Rick Vaive
- Alternate captains: None
- Arena: Maple Leaf Gardens

Team leaders
- Goals: Rick Vaive (52)
- Assists: Rick Vaive (41)
- Points: Rick Vaive (93)
- Penalty minutes: Jim Korn (257)
- Wins: Allan Bester (11)
- Goals against average: Allan Bester (4.35)

The 1983–84 Toronto Maple Leafs season was the 67th season of the franchise, 57th season as the Maple Leafs. The Maple Leafs missed the playoffs for the first time since the 1981–82 season.

== Offseason ==
=== NHL draft ===
Round	#	Player	Nationality	College/Junior/Club team
1	7	Russ Courtnall	Canada	Victoria Cougars (WHL)
2	28	Jeff Jackson	Canada	Brantford Alexanders (OHL)
3	48	Allan Bester	Canada	Brantford Alexanders (OHL)
5	83	Dan Hodgson	Canada	Prince Albert Raiders (WHL)
7	128	Cam Plante	Canada	Brandon Wheat Kings (WHL)
8	148	Paul Bifano	Canada	Burnaby Bluehawks (BCJHL)
9	168	Cliff Abrecht	Canada	Princeton University (ECAC)
10	184	Greg Rolston	United States	Powers High School (USHS-MI)
10	188	Dale Ross	Canada	Kitchener Rangers (OHL)
11	208	Mike Tomlak	Canada	Cornwall Royals (OHL)
12	228	Ron Choules	Canada	Trois-Rivières Draveurs (QMJHL)

== Regular season ==
=== Final standings ===
Norris Division
	GP	W	L	T	GF	GA	Pts
**Minnesota North Stars**	80	39	31	10	345	344	88
**St. Louis Blues**	80	32	41	7	293	316	71
**Detroit Red Wings**	80	31	42	7	298	323	69
**Chicago Black Hawks**	80	30	42	8	277	311	68
Toronto Maple Leafs	80	26	45	9	303	387	61

Note: GP = Games played, W = Wins, L = Losses, T = Ties, Pts = Points, GF = Goals for, GA = Goals against
Note: Teams that qualified for the playoffs are highlighted in bold.

=== Record vs. opponents ===
Norris Division record vs. opponents

==== Vs. Campbell Conference ====
**Vs. Norris Division**

1983–84 NHL records
Team	**CHI**	**DET**	**MIN**	**STL**	**TOR**	**Total**
Chicago	—	4−4	2−6	4−3−1	5−2−1	**15−15−2**
Detroit	4−4	—	2−6	5−3	3−5	**14−18−0**
Minnesota	6−2	6−2	—	5−2−1	5−2−1	**22−8−2**
St. Louis	3−4−1	3−5	2−5−1	—	6−2	**14−16−2**
Toronto	2−5−1	5−3	2−5−1	2−6	—	**11−19−2**

**Vs. Smythe Division**

1983–84 NHL records
Team	**CGY**	**EDM**	**LAK**	**VAN**	**WIN**	**Total**
Chicago	1−2	1−2	0−3	2−1	1−2	**5−10−0**
Detroit	2−1	0−3	0−2−1	1−2	1−0−2	**4−8−3**
Minnesota	1−2	0−2−1	1−1−1	1−1−1	2−1	**5−7−3**
St. Louis	0−2−1	2−1	1−1−1	2−1	1−2	**6−7−2**
Toronto	0−1−2	1−2	2−0−1	0−1−2	0−3	**3−7−5**

==== Vs. Wales Conference ====
**Vs. Adams Division**

1983–84 NHL records
Team	**BOS**	**BUF**	**HFD**	**MTL**	**QUE**	**Total**
Chicago	2−1	2−1	1−2	0−2−1	1−1−1	**6−7−2**
Detroit	1−2	1−1−1	1−1−1	0−3	2−1	**5−8−2**
Minnesota	2−1	2−1	0−3	2−1	0−2−1	**6−8−1**
St. Louis	0−3	1−2	1−2	0−3	0−2−1	**2−12−1**
Toronto	2−1	0−2−1	1−2	1−2	1−2	**5−9−1**

**Vs. Patrick Division**

1983–84 NHL records
Team	**NJD**	**NYI**	**NYR**	**PHI**	**PIT**	**WSH**	**Total**
Chicago	1−2	0−3	1−2	0−1−2	1−1−1	1−1−1	**4−10−4**
Detroit	1−2	2−1	0−3	0−1−2	3−0	2−1	**8−8−2**
Minnesota	2−1	0−2−1	1−1−1	1−0−2	2−1	0−3	**6−8−4**
St. Louis	3−0	1−1−1	1−2	2−1	2−0−1	1−2	**10−6−2**
Toronto	3−0	1−2	2−1	0−3	1−1−1	0−3	**7−10−1**

== Schedule and results ==
1983–84 regular season
October

Game	Result	Date	Score	Opponent	Record
1	L	October 5, 1983	4–5	@ Edmonton Oilers (1983–84)	0–1–0
2	W	October 8, 1983	6–3	@ Los Angeles Kings (1983–84)	1–1–0
3	L	October 9, 1983	4–7	@ Vancouver Canucks (1983–84)	1–2–0
4	T	October 12, 1983	4–4 OT	Buffalo Sabres (1983–84)	1–2–1
5	W	October 15, 1983	10–8	Chicago Black Hawks (1983–84)	2–2–1
6	W	October 16, 1983	4–1	@ New Jersey Devils (1983–84)	3–2–1
7	L	October 19, 1983	1–8	Quebec Nordiques (1983–84)	3–3–1
8	W	October 22, 1983	5–3	Montreal Canadiens (1983–84)	4–3–1
9	L	October 23, 1983	5–8	@ Philadelphia Flyers (1983–84)	4–4–1
10	W	October 26, 1983	8–3	Edmonton Oilers (1983–84)	5–4–1
11	W	October 28, 1983	5–3	@ New York Rangers (1983–84)	6–4–1
12	T	October 29, 1983	5–5 OT	Los Angeles Kings (1983–84)	6–4–2

November

Game	Result	Date	Score	Opponent	Record
13	L	November 2, 1983	5–8	@ Minnesota North Stars (1983–84)	6–5–2
14	L	November 4, 1983	2–8	@ Winnipeg Jets (1983–84)	6–6–2
15	L	November 5, 1983	3–5	@ Calgary Flames (1983–84)	6–7–2
16	W	November 9, 1983	2–1	New Jersey Devils (1983–84)	7–7–2
17	L	November 11, 1983	1–3	@ Buffalo Sabres (1983–84)	7–8–2
18	L	November 12, 1983	3–5	Philadelphia Flyers (1983–84)	7–9–2
19	W	November 16, 1983	3–2	@ Pittsburgh Penguins (1983–84)	8–9–2
20	L	November 17, 1983	1–4	@ Boston Bruins (1983–84)	8–10–2
21	W	November 19, 1983	5–4	Detroit Red Wings (1983–84)	9–10–2
22	L	November 22, 1983	4–7	@ St. Louis Blues (1983–84)	9–11–2
23	W	November 23, 1983	6–4	@ Minnesota North Stars (1983–84)	10–11–2
24	L	November 26, 1983	6–7 OT	Minnesota North Stars (1983–84)	10–12–2
25	W	November 30, 1983	5–3	@ Detroit Red Wings (1983–84)	11–12–2

December

Game	Result	Date	Score	Opponent	Record
26	T	December 3, 1983	5–5 OT	Vancouver Canucks (1983–84)	11–12–3
27	L	December 7, 1983	3–4	St. Louis Blues (1983–84)	11–13–3
28	W	December 8, 1983	8–6	@ Hartford Whalers (1983–84)	12–13–3
29	T	December 10, 1983	3–3 OT	Calgary Flames (1983–84)	12–13–4
30	L	December 14, 1983	4–8	Winnipeg Jets (1983–84)	12–14–4
31	L	December 17, 1983	1–3	Washington Capitals (1983–84)	12–15–4
32	T	December 18, 1983	3–3 OT	Pittsburgh Penguins (1983–84)	12–15–5
33	W	December 21, 1983	5–4	St. Louis Blues (1983–84)	13–15–5
34	L	December 23, 1983	2–9	@ Detroit Red Wings (1983–84)	13–16–5
35	W	December 26, 1983	6–2	Detroit Red Wings (1983–84)	14–16–5
36	L	December 28, 1983	6–8	@ Minnesota North Stars (1983–84)	14–17–5
37	L	December 29, 1983	1–3	@ St. Louis Blues (1983–84)	14–18–5
38	W	December 31, 1983	5–3	Los Angeles Kings (1983–84)	15–18–5

January

Game	Result	Date	Score	Opponent	Record
39	L	January 3, 1984	3–8	@ St. Louis Blues (1983–84)	15–19–5
40	L	January 4, 1984	1–5	@ Chicago Black Hawks (1983–84)	15–20–5
41	L	January 7, 1984	2–4	@ Quebec Nordiques (1983–84)	15–21–5
42	L	January 8, 1984	2–5	St. Louis Blues (1983–84)	15–22–5
43	L	January 11, 1984	4–6	Montreal Canadiens (1983–84)	15–23–5
44	L	January 12, 1984	4–5 OT	@ Minnesota North Stars (1983–84)	15–24–5
45	T	January 14, 1984	2–2 OT	Chicago Black Hawks (1983–84)	15–24–6
46	W	January 18, 1984	9–4	Minnesota North Stars (1983–84)	16–24–6
47	L	January 21, 1984	3–6	New York Rangers (1983–84)	16–25–6
48	L	January 23, 1984	2–6	Chicago Black Hawks (1983–84)	16–26–6
49	L	January 24, 1984	3–6	@ St. Louis Blues (1983–84)	16–27–6
50	L	January 27, 1984	1–6	@ Washington Capitals (1983–84)	16–28–6
51	L	January 28, 1984	0–8	Washington Capitals (1983–84)	16–29–6

February

Game	Result	Date	Score	Opponent	Record
52	L	February 1, 1984	2–7	@ Chicago Black Hawks (1983–84)	16–30–6
53	W	February 4, 1984	6–3	@ Detroit Red Wings (1983–84)	17–30–6
54	L	February 5, 1984	0–7	@ Philadelphia Flyers (1983–84)	17–31–6
55	W	February 8, 1984	6–4	Boston Bruins (1983–84)	18–31–6
56	W	February 9, 1984	6–3	@ Boston Bruins (1983–84)	19–31–6
57	W	February 11, 1984	5–2	Quebec Nordiques (1983–84)	20–31–6
58	W	February 13, 1984	3–1	New York Islanders (1983–84)	21–31–6
59	L	February 15, 1984	1–3	Minnesota North Stars (1983–84)	21–32–6
60	L	February 18, 1984	2–8	Hartford Whalers (1983–84)	21–33–6
61	L	February 19, 1984	2–6	Detroit Red Wings (1983–84)	21–34–6
62	T	February 21, 1984	2–2 OT	@ Calgary Flames (1983–84)	21–34–7
63	L	February 25, 1984	3–8	@ Edmonton Oilers (1983–84)	21–35–7
64	T	February 26, 1984	4–4 OT	@ Vancouver Canucks (1983–84)	21–35–8
65	W	February 29, 1984	3–1	New York Rangers (1983–84)	22–35–8

March

Game	Result	Date	Score	Opponent	Record
66	L	March 3, 1984	6–11	New York Islanders (1983–84)	22–36–8
67	L	March 4, 1984	4–5	@ Chicago Black Hawks (1983–84)	22–37–8
68	W	March 7, 1984	8–4	New Jersey Devils (1983–84)	23–37–8
69	L	March 8, 1984	5–9	@ New York Islanders (1983–84)	23–38–8
70	W	March 10, 1984	4–3 OT	Detroit Red Wings (1983–84)	24–38–8
71	L	March 12, 1984	7–8 OT	Winnipeg Jets (1983–84)	24–39–8
72	T	March 14, 1984	3–3 OT	Minnesota North Stars (1983–84)	24–39–9
73	L	March 15, 1984	3–5	@ Hartford Whalers (1983–84)	24–40–9
74	L	March 17, 1984	1–6	@ Montreal Canadiens (1983–84)	24–41–9
75	L	March 21, 1984	1–3	@ Pittsburgh Penguins (1983–84)	24–42–9
76	W	March 24, 1984	7–3	Chicago Black Hawks (1983–84)	25–42–9
77	L	March 25, 1984	4–5	@ Chicago Black Hawks (1983–84)	25–43–9
78	L	March 28, 1984	2–4	@ Detroit Red Wings (1983–84)	25–44–9
79	W	March 31, 1984	6–4	St. Louis Blues (1983–84)	26–44–9

April

Game	Result	Date	Score	Opponent	Record
80	L	April 1, 1984	2–4	@ Buffalo Sabres (1983–84)	26–45–9

Legend: Win (2 points) Loss (0 points) Tie (1 point)

== Player statistics ==
=== Regular season ===
Scoring

Player	Pos	GP	G	A	Pts	PIM	+/-	PPG	SHG	GWG
Rick Vaive	RW	76	52	41	93	114	-12	17	0	6
Dan Daoust	C	78	18	56	74	88	-16	8	0	1
John Anderson	RW	73	37	31	68	22	-12	14	0	5
Bill Derlago	C	79	40	20	60	50	-8	8	2	3
Jim Benning	D	79	12	39	51	66	-4	6	0	1
Dale McCourt	C	72	19	24	43	10	-16	8	2	1
Borje Salming	D	68	5	38	43	92	-34	2	1	0
Greg Terrion	LW	79	15	24	39	36	-6	0	2	2
Stew Gavin	LW	80	10	22	32	90	-6	0	1	3
Gaston Gingras	D	59	7	20	27	16	-30	4	0	0
Jim Korn	D/LW	65	12	14	26	257	-33	0	0	1
Miroslav Frycer	RW	47	10	16	26	55	-24	1	0	2
Terry Martin	LW	63	15	10	25	51	-8	2	2	1
Walt Poddubny	LW	38	11	14	25	48	-13	4	0	0
Peter Ihnacak	C	47	10	13	23	24	-21	5	0	0
Dave Farrish	D	59	4	19	23	57	-13	1	0	0
Bill Stewart	D	56	2	17	19	116	-1	0	0	0
Billy Harris	RW	50	7	10	17	14	-20	0	0	0
Gary Nylund	D	47	2	14	16	103	-27	0	0	0
Gary Leeman	RW	52	4	8	12	31	-14	1	0	0
Russ Courtnall	RW	14	3	9	12	6	0	1	0	0
Pat Graham	LW	41	4	4	8	65	-9	0	0	0
Frank Nigro	C	17	2	3	5	16	-4	0	0	0
Rich Costello	C	10	2	1	3	2	-5	1	0	0
Dave Hutchison	D	47	0	3	3	137	5	0	0	0
Bob McGill	D	11	0	2	2	51	1	0	0	0
Mike Palmateer	G	34	0	2	2	28	0	0	0	0
Ken Strong	LW	2	0	2	2	2	0	0	0	0
Allan Bester	G	32	0	0	0	6	0	0	0	0
Greg Britz	RW	6	0	0	0	2	-1	0	0	0
Bruce Dowie	G	2	0	0	0	0	0	0	0	0
Basil McRae	LW	3	0	0	0	19	-3	0	0	0
Fred Perlini	C	1	0	0	0	0	0	0	0	0
Rick St. Croix	G	20	0	0	0	0	0	0	0	0
Ken Wregget	G	3	0	0	0	0	0	0	0	0
Gary Yaremchuk	C	1	0	0	0	0	-1	0	0	0

Goaltending

Player	MIN	GP	W	L	T	GA	GAA	SO
Allan Bester	1848	32	11	16	4	134	4.35	0
Mike Palmateer	1831	34	9	17	4	149	4.88	0
Rick St. Croix	939	20	5	10	0	80	5.11	0
Ken Wregget	165	3	1	1	1	14	5.09	0
Bruce Dowie	72	2	0	1	0	4	3.33	0
Team:	4855	80	26	45	9	381	4.71	0

Note:

Pos = Position;GP = Games played; G = Goals; A = Assists; Pts = Points; PIM = Penalty minutes; +/- = Plus/minus; PPG = Power-play goals; SHG = Short-handed goals; GWG = Game-winning goals
Pos = Position;GP = Games played; Min, TOI = Minutes played; W = Wins; L = Losses; T,T/OT = Ties; OTL = Overtime losses; GA = Goals-against; GAA = Goals-against average; SO = Shutouts; SA = Shots against; SV = Shots saved;SV% = Save percentage;

== Transactions ==
The Maple Leafs were involved in the following transactions during the 1983–84 season.

=== Trades ===
August 12, 1983	To Quebec Nordiques Richard Turmel	To Toronto Maple Leafs Basil McRae
August 12, 1983	To Pittsburgh Penguins Rocky Saganiuk; Vincent Tremblay	To Toronto Maple Leafs Pat Graham; Nick Ricci
October 6, 1983	To Washington Capitals Dave Shand	To Toronto Maple Leafs Lee Norwood
February 15, 1984	To Los Angeles Kings Billy Harris	To Toronto Maple Leafs Cash

=== Free agents ===
Player	Former team
Bill Stewart	St. Louis Blues
Dale McCourt	Buffalo Sabres
Greg Britz	Undrafted Free Agent
Steve Thomas	Undrafted Free Agent

Player	New team
Barry Melrose	Detroit Red Wings
Bob Manno	Detroit Red Wings
Doug Gibson	Winnipeg Jets
Reid Bailey	Hartford Whalers
