= 1983–84 New York Islanders season =

NHL hockey team season

1983–84 New York Islanders
- Wales Conference champions
- Patrick Division champions
- Division: 1st Patrick
- Conference: 1st Wales
- 1983–84 record: 50–26–4
- Home record: 28–11–1
- Road record: 22–15–3
- Goals for: 357
- Goals against: 269

Team information
- General manager: Bill Torrey
- Coach: Al Arbour
- Captain: Denis Potvin
- Alternate captains: None
- Arena: Nassau Coliseum

Team leaders
- Goals: Mike Bossy (51)
- Assists: Bryan Trottier (71)
- Points: Mike Bossy (118)
- Penalty minutes: Duane Sutter (94)
- Wins: Billy Smith (23)
- Goals against average: Billy Smith (2.72)

The 1983–84 New York Islanders season was the 12th season for the franchise in the National Hockey League (NHL). The Islanders entered to the season as the four-time defending Stanley Cup champions, and subsequently went the Stanley Cup Final for the fifth time in a row, but lost four games to one in a rematch against the Edmonton Oilers.

The Islanders nevertheless set a new North American major professional sports record by winning nineteen consecutive playoff series (two more than the seventeen series won by the Boston Celtics in their eight-year NBA championship dynasty) and unmatched in any major sport since.

As of 2026, this remains the most recent season that the Islanders made it to the Stanley Cup Final.

== Offseason ==
=== NHL draft ===
Round	#	Player	Nationality	College/Junior/Club team
1	3	Pat LaFontaine	United States	Verdun Juniors (QMJHL)
1	16	Gerald Diduck	Canada	Lethbridge Broncos (WHL)
2	37	Garnet McKechney	Canada	Kitchener Rangers (OHL)
3	57	Mike Neill	Canada	Sault Ste. Marie Greyhounds (OHL)
4	65	Mikko Makela	Finland	Ilves Tampere (Finland)
5	84	Bob Caulfield	United States	Detroit Lakes High School (USHS-MN)
5	97	Ron Viglasi	Canada	Victoria Cougars (WHL)
6	117	Darin Illikainen	United States	Hermantown High School (USHS-MN)
7	137	Jim Sprenger	United States	Cloquet High School (USHS-MN)
8	157	Dale Henry	Canada	Saskatoon Blades (WHL)
9	177	Kevin Vescio	Canada	North Bay Centennials (OHL)
10	197	Dave Shellington	Canada	Cornwall Royals (OHL)
11	217	John Bjorkman	United States	Warroad High School (USHS-MN)
12	237	Peter McGeough	United States	Bishop Hendricken High School (USHS-RI)

== Regular season ==
=== All Star Game ===
The 35th National Hockey League All-Star Game was held at Nassau Veterans Memorial Coliseum. The Campbell Conference defeated the Wales Conference 9–3. Denis Potvin, Bryan Trottier, Mike Bossy, and head coach Al Arbour participated in the All-Star Game as representatives of the Wales Conference.

=== Season standings ===
Patrick Division
	GP	W	L	T	GF	GA	Pts
**New York Islanders**	80	50	26	4	357	269	104
**Washington Capitals**	80	48	27	5	308	226	101
**Philadelphia Flyers**	80	44	26	10	350	290	98
**New York Rangers**	80	42	29	9	314	304	93
New Jersey Devils	80	17	56	7	231	350	41
Pittsburgh Penguins	80	16	58	6	254	390	38

Note: GP = Games played, W = Wins, L = Losses, T = Ties, Pts = Points, GF = Goals for, GA = Goals against
Note: Teams that qualified for the playoffs are highlighted in bold.

=== Record vs. opponents ===
Patrick Division record vs. opponents

==== Vs. Wales Conference ====
**Vs. Patrick Division**

1983–84 NHL records
Team	**NJD**	**NYI**	**NYR**	**PHI**	**PIT**	**WSH**	**Total**
New Jersey	—	0−7	1−5−1	0−7	3−4	0−5−2	4−28−3
N.Y. Islanders	7−0	—	3−4	4−3	6−1	4−3	24−11−0
N.Y. Rangers	5−1−1	4−3	—	4−3	5−2	3−3−1	21−12−2
Philadelphia	7−0	3−4	3−4	—	7−0	3−4	23−12−0
Pittsburgh	4−3	1−6	2−5	0–7	—	1−6	8−27−0
Washington	5−0−2	3−4	3−3−1	4–3	6–1	—	21−11−3

**Vs. Adams Division**

1983–84 NHL records
Team	**BOS**	**BUF**	**HFD**	**MTL**	**QUE**	**Total**
New Jersey	1−2	0−2−1	1−1−1	1−2	1−2	4−9−2
N.Y. Islanders	0−2−1	3−0	1−2	3−0	1−2	8−6−1
N.Y. Rangers	0−2−1	1−1−1	1−2	1−2	2−0−1	5−7−3
Philadelphia	1−1−1	0−3	1−2	2−0−1	2−0−1	6−6−3
Pittsburgh	0−3	0−3	2−1	0−2−1	0−3	2−12−1
Washington	1−2	0−2−1	2−1	3−0	1−2	7−7−1

==== Vs. Campbell Conference ====
**Vs. Norris Division**

1983–84 NHL records
Team	**CHI**	**DET**	**MIN**	**STL**	**TOR**	**Total**
New Jersey	2−1	2−1	1−2	0−3	0−3	5−10−0
N.Y. Islanders	3−0	1−2	2−0−1	1−1−1	2−1	9−4−2
N.Y. Rangers	2−1	3−0	1−1−1	2−1	1−2	9−5−1
Philadelphia	1−0−2	1−0−2	0−1−2	1−2	3−0	6−3−6
Pittsburgh	1−1−1	0−3	1−2	0−2−1	1−1−1	3−9−3
Washington	1−1−1	1−2	3−0	2−1	3−0	10−4−1

**Vs. Smythe Division**

1983–84 NHL records
Team	**CGY**	**EDM**	**LAK**	**VAN**	**WIN**	**Total**
New Jersey	0−2−1	0−2−1	2−1	1−2	1−2	4−9−2
N.Y. Islanders	0−3	3−0	2−0−1	3−0	1−2	9−5−1
N.Y. Rangers	2−1	1−2	1−0−2	1−1−1	2−1	7−5−3
Philadelphia	2−1	2−0−1	2−1	1−2	2−1	9−5−1
Pittsburgh	0−1−2	0−3	1−2	1−2	1−2	3−10−2
Washington	2−1	1−2	3−0	2−1	2−1	10−5−0

== Schedule and results ==
=== Regular season ===
1983–84 regular season
October: 6–6–0 (home: 2–4–0; road: 4–2–0)

Game	Date	Visitor	Score	Home	OT	Decision	Location Attendance	Record	Pts	Recap
1	October 4, 1983	NY Islanders	3–7	Quebec			Quebec Coliseum	0–1–0	0	
2	October 6, 1983	NY Islanders	7–4	Montreal		Smith	Montreal Forum; 16,685	1–1–0	2	
3	October 8, 1983	NY Islanders	8–7	Washington	OT		Capital Centre	2–1–0	4	
4	October 11, 1983	Los Angeles	2–5	NY Islanders			Nassau Veterans Memorial Coliseum	3–1–0	6	
5	October 15, 1983	Philadelphia	5–1	NY Islanders			Nassau Veterans Memorial Coliseum	3–2–0	6	
6	October 16, 1983	NY Islanders	3–2	Buffalo			Buffalo Memorial Auditorium	4–2–0	8	
7	October 18, 1983	Calgary	4–3	NY Islanders			Nassau Veterans Memorial Coliseum	4–3–0	8	
8	October 22, 1983	NY Rangers	3–2	NY Islanders			Nassau Veterans Memorial Coliseum	4–4–0	8	
9	October 23, 1983	NY Islanders	5–6	NY Rangers	OT		Madison Square Garden	4–5–0	8	
10	October 25, 1983	Winnipeg	4–2	NY Islanders			Nassau Veterans Memorial Coliseum	4–6–0	8	
11	October 29, 1983	New Jersey	3–5	NY Islanders			Nassau Veterans Memorial Coliseum	5–6–0	10	
12	October 30, 1983	NY Islanders	6–2	Philadelphia			The Spectrum	6–6–0	12	

November: 10–2–1 (home: 7–1–0; road: 3–1–1)

Game	Date	Visitor	Score	Home	OT	Decision	Location Attendance	Record	Pts	Recap
13	November 1, 1983	Vancouver	3–6	NY Islanders			Nassau Veterans Memorial Coliseum	8–5–0	16	
14	November 4, 1983	NY Islanders	6–1	New Jersey			Brendan Byrne Arena	9–5–0	18	
15	November 5, 1983	Buffalo	0–4	NY Islanders			Nassau Veterans Memorial Coliseum	10–5–0	20	
16	November 8, 1983	Philadelphia	1–4	NY Islanders			Nassau Veterans Memorial Coliseum	11–5–0	22	
17	November 11, 1983	NY Islanders	6–5	Pittsburgh			Pittsburgh Civic Arena	12–5–0	24	
18	November 12, 1983	Pittsburgh	4–2	NY Islanders			Nassau Veterans Memorial Coliseum	11–7–0	22	
19	November 15, 1983	Hartford	4–6	NY Islanders			Nassau Veterans Memorial Coliseum	12–7–0	24	
20	November 18, 1983	NY Islanders	1–7	Washington			Capital Centre	12–8–0	24	
21	November 19, 1983	Washington	2–6	NY Islanders			Nassau Veterans Memorial Coliseum	13–8–0	26	
22	November 22, 1983	Quebec	2–3	NY Islanders			Nassau Veterans Memorial Coliseum	14–8–0	28	
23	November 23, 1983	NY Islanders	4–2	Philadelphia			The Spectrum	15–8–0	30	
24	November 26, 1983	Chicago	3–9	NY Islanders			Nassau Veterans Memorial Coliseum	16–8–0	32	
25	November 29, 1983	NY Islanders	5–5	St. Louis	OT		St. Louis Arena	16–8–1	33	

December: 10–3–1 (home: 5–1–0; road: 5–2–1)

Game	Date	Visitor	Score	Home	OT	Decision	Location Attendance	Record	Pts	Recap
26	December 1, 1983	NY Islanders	2–6	Calgary			Olympic Saddledome	16–9–1	33	
27	December 4, 1983	NY Islanders	4–2	Edmonton		Melanson	Northlands Coliseum; 17,498	17–9–1	35	
28	December 6, 1983	NY Islanders	5–2	Vancouver			Pacific Coliseum	18–9–1	37	
29	December 7, 1983	NY Islanders	4–4	Los Angeles	OT		The Forum	18–9–2	38	
30	December 10, 1983	NY Islanders	4–2	Minnesota			Met Center	19–9–2	40	
31	December 13, 1983	Edmonton	5–8	NY Islanders		Smith	Nassau Veterans Memorial Coliseum; 15,850	20–9–2	42	
32	December 15, 1983	Detroit	2–4	NY Islanders			Nassau Veterans Memorial Coliseum	21–9–2	44	
33	December 17, 1983	NY Rangers	1–7	NY Islanders			Nassau Veterans Memorial Coliseum	22–9–2	46	
34	December 20, 1983	Pittsburgh	3–11	NY Islanders			Nassau Veterans Memorial Coliseum	23–9–2	48	
35	December 22, 1983	Washington	1–6	NY Islanders			Nassau Veterans Memorial Coliseum	24–9–2	50	
36	December 23, 1983	NY Islanders	3–7	Washington			Capital Centre	24–10–2	50	
37	December 28, 1983	NY Islanders	6–5	Los Angeles	OT		The Forum	25–10–2	52	
38	December 30, 1983	NY Islanders	3–4	Winnipeg	OT		Winnipeg Arena	25–11–2	52	
39	December 31, 1983	NY Islanders	7–3	Minnesota			Met Center	26–11–2	54	

January: 5–8–0 (home: 4–3–0; road: 1–5–0)

Game	Date	Visitor	Score	Home	OT	Decision	Location Attendance	Record	Pts	Recap
40	January 3, 1984	Boston	4–2	NY Islanders			Nassau Veterans Memorial Coliseum	26–12–2	54	
41	January 5, 1984	NY Islanders	2–4	Hartford			Hartford Civic Center	26–13–2	54	
42	January 7, 1984	Chicago	3–5	NY Islanders			Nassau Veterans Memorial Coliseum	27–13–2	56	
43	January 8, 1984	NY Islanders	4–5	NY Rangers			Madison Square Garden	27–14–2	56	
44	January 10, 1984	New Jersey	2–4	NY Islanders			Nassau Veterans Memorial Coliseum	28–14–8	58	
45	January 12, 1984	Montreal	3–7	NY Islanders		Smith	Nassau Veterans Memorial Coliseum; 15,850	29–14–2	60	
46	January 14, 1984	NY Rangers	2–4	NY Islanders			Nassau Veterans Memorial Coliseum	30–14–2	62	
47	January 16, 1984	NY Islanders	0–2	Boston			Boston Garden	30–15–2	62	
48	January 18, 1984	NY Islanders	9–1	Chicago			Chicago Stadium	31–15–2	64	
49	January 21, 1984	NY Islanders	1–7	Philadelphia			The Spectrum	31–16–2	64	
50	January 24, 1984	NY Islanders	0–4	Detroit			Joe Louis Arena	31–17–2	64	
51	January 26, 1984	Quebec	5–1	NY Islanders			Nassau Veterans Memorial Coliseum	31–18–2	64	
52	January 28, 1984	Detroit	4–3	NY Islanders			Nassau Veterans Memorial Coliseum	31–19–2	64	
NHL All-Star Game in East Rutherford, New Jersey

February: 9–4–0 (home: 6–1–0; road: 3–3–0)

Game	Date	Visitor	Score	Home	OT	Decision	Location Attendance	Record	Pts	Recap
53	February 2, 1984	St. Louis	5–2	NY Islanders			Nassau Veterans Memorial Coliseum	31–20–2	64	
54	February 4, 1984	Pittsburgh	5–6	NY Islanders			Nassau Veterans Memorial Coliseum	32–20–2	66	
55	February 5, 1984	NY Islanders	5–4	Pittsburgh			Pittsburgh Civic Arena	33–20–2	68	
56	February 7, 1984	Edmonton	3–5	NY Islanders		Melanson	Nassau Veterans Memorial Coliseum; 15,806	34–20–2	70	
57	February 11, 1984	Vancouver	4–6	NY Islanders			Nassau Veterans Memorial Coliseum	35–20–2	72	
58	February 13, 1984	NY Islanders	1–3	Toronto			Maple Leaf Gardens	35–21–2	72	
59	February 15, 1984	NY Islanders	2–3	NY Rangers			Madison Square Garden	35–22–2	72	
60	February 18, 1984	NY Rangers	3–4	NY Islanders			Nassau Veterans Memorial Coliseum	36–22–2	74	
61	February 19, 1984	NY Islanders	5–4	New Jersey	OT		Brendan Byrne Arena	37–22–2	76	
62	February 23, 1984	St. Louis	1–5	NY Islanders			Nassau Veterans Memorial Coliseum	38–22–2	78	
63	February 25, 1984	New Jersey	1–7	NY Islanders			Nassau Veterans Memorial Coliseum	39–22–1	80	
64	February 26, 1984	NY Islanders	3–5	Philadelphia			The Spectrum	39–23–2	80	
65	February 29, 1984	NY Islanders	4–3	Winnipeg			Winnipeg Arena	40–23–2	82	

March: 9–3–2 (home: 4–2–1; road: 5–1–1)

Game	Date	Visitor	Score	Home	OT	Decision	Location Attendance	Record	Pts	Recap
66	March 3, 1984	NY Islanders	11–6	Toronto			Maple Leaf Gardens	41–23–2	84	
67	March 6, 1984	Philadelphia	2–5	NY Islanders			Nassau Veterans Memorial Coliseum	42–23–2	86	
68	March 8, 1984	Toronto	5–9	NY Islanders			Nassau Veterans Memorial Coliseum	43–23–2	88	
69	March 10, 1984	Calgary	5–4	NY Islanders	OT		Nassau Veterans Memorial Coliseum	43–24–2	88	
70	March 11, 1984	NY Islanders	6–4	Pittsburgh			Pittsburgh Civic Arena	44–24–2	90	
71	March 13, 1984	NY Islanders	5–1	New Jersey			Brendan Byrne Arena	45–24–2	92	
72	March 17, 1984	Washington	2–1	NY Islanders			Nassau Veterans Memorial Coliseum	45–25–2	92	
73	March 18, 1984	NY Islanders	4–5	Hartford			Hartford Civic Center	45–26–2	92	
74	March 20, 1984	New Jersey	2–5	NY Islanders			Nassau Veterans Memorial Coliseum	46–26–2	94	
75	March 22, 1984	NY Islanders	3–3	Boston	OT		Boston Garden	46–26–3	95	
76	March 24, 1984	Minnesota	4–4	NY Islanders	OT		Nassau Veterans Memorial Coliseum	46–26–4	96	
77	March 25, 1984	NY Islanders	5–3	Buffalo			Buffalo Memorial Auditorium	47–26–4	98	
78	March 27, 1984	Montreal	0–7	NY Islanders		Smith	Nassau Veterans Memorial Coliseum; 15,850	48–26–4	100	
79	March 31, 1984	NY Islanders	3–1	Washington			Capital Centre	49–26–4	102	

April: 1–0–0 (home: 0–0–0; road: 1–0–0)

Game	Date	Visitor	Score	Home	OT	Decision	Location Attendance	Record	Pts	Recap
80	April 1, 1984	NY Islanders	2–1	Pittsburgh			Pittsburgh Civic Arena	50–26–4	104	

Legend: Win (2 points) Loss (0 points) Tie (1 point)

=== Playoffs ===
1984 Stanley Cup playoffs
Patrick Division Semifinals vs. (P4) New York Rangers – Islanders won 3–2

Game	Date	Visitor	Score	Home	OT	Decision	Location Attendance	Series	Recap
1	April 4, 1984	NY Rangers	1–4	NY Islanders			Nassau Veterans Memorial Coliseum	1–0	
2	April 5, 1984	NY Rangers	3–0	NY Islanders			Nassau Veterans Memorial Coliseum	1–1	
3	April 7, 1984	NY Islanders	2–7	NY Rangers			Madison Square Garden	1–2	
4	April 8, 1984	NY Islanders	4–1	NY Rangers			Madison Square Garden	2–2	
5	April 10, 1984	NY Rangers	2–3	NY Islanders	OT		Nassau Veterans Memorial Coliseum	3–2	

Patrick Division Finals vs. (P2) Washington Capitals – Islanders won 4–1

Game	Date	Visitor	Score	Home	OT	Decision	Location Attendance	Series	Recap
1	April 12, 1984	Washington	3–2	NY Islanders			Nassau Veterans Memorial Coliseum	0–1	
2	April 13, 1984	Washington	4–5	NY Islanders	OT		Nassau Veterans Memorial Coliseum	1–1	
3	April 15, 1984	NY Islanders	3–1	Washington			Capital Centre	2–1	
4	April 16, 1984	NY Islanders	5–2	Washington			Capital Centre	3–1	
5	April 18, 1984	Washington	3–5	NY Islanders			Nassau Veterans Memorial Coliseum	4–1	

Wales Conference Finals vs. (A4) Montreal Canadiens – Islanders won 4–2

Game	Date	Visitor	Score	Home	OT	Decision	Location Attendance	Series	Recap
1	April 24, 1984	NY Islanders	0–3	Montreal		Smith	Montreal Forum; 16,904	0–1	
2	April 26, 1984	NY Islanders	2–4	Montreal		Smith	Montreal Forum; 17,836	0–2	
3	April 28, 1984	Montreal	2–5	NY Islanders		Smith	Nassau Veterans Memorial Coliseum; 15,861	1–2	
4	May 1, 1984	Montreal	1–3	NY Islanders		Smith	Nassau Veterans Memorial Coliseum; 15,861	2–2	
5	May 3, 1984	NY Islanders	3–1	Montreal		Smith	Montreal Forum; 18,095	3–2	
6	May 5, 1984	Montreal	1–4	NY Islanders		Smith	Nassau Veterans Memorial Coliseum; 15,861	4–2	

Stanley Cup Final vs. (S1) Edmonton Oilers – Oilers won 4–1

Game	Date	Visitor	Score	Home	OT	Decision	Location Attendance	Series	Recap
1	May 10, 1984	Edmonton	1–0	NY Islanders		Smith	Nassau Veterans Memorial Coliseum; 15,861	1–0	
2	May 12, 1984	Edmonton	1–6	NY Islanders		Smith	Nassau Veterans Memorial Coliseum; 15,861	1–1	
3	May 15, 1984	NY Islanders	2–7	Edmonton		Smith	Northlands Coliseum; 17,498	1–2	
4	May 17, 1984	NY Islanders	2–7	Edmonton		Smith	Northlands Coliseum; 17,498	1–3	
5	May 19, 1984	NY Islanders	2–5	Edmonton		Melanson	Northlands Coliseum; 17,498	1–4	

Legend: Win Loss

== Player statistics ==
Regular season
Scoring

Player	Pos	GP	G	A	Pts	PIM	+/-	PPG	SHG	GWG
Mike Bossy	RW	67	51	67	118	8	66	6	0	11
Bryan Trottier	C	68	40	71	111	59	70	7	3	4
Denis Potvin	D	78	22	63	85	87	55	11	1	3
John Tonelli	LW	73	27	40	67	66	21	5	1	7
Greg Gilbert	LW	79	31	35	66	59	51	6	0	2
Bob Bourne	C	78	22	34	56	75	12	5	5	2
Brent Sutter	C	69	34	15	49	69	4	7	0	6
Tomas Jonsson	D	72	11	36	47	54	12	2	0	1
Butch Goring	C	71	22	24	46	8	9	0	5	3
Bob Nystrom	RW	74	15	29	44	80	9	1	0	1
Duane Sutter	RW	78	17	23	40	94	2	2	0	1
Stefan Persson	D	75	9	24	33	65	30	4	0	2
Clark Gillies	LW	76	12	16	28	65	5	3	0	2
Anders Kallur	RW	65	9	14	23	24	0	2	3	1
Pat LaFontaine	C	15	13	6	19	6	9	1	0	0
Dave Langevin	D	69	3	16	19	53	26	0	0	1
Ken Morrow	D	63	3	11	14	45	26	0	0	1
Gord Dineen	D	43	1	11	12	32	10	0	0	0
Wayne Merrick	C	31	6	5	11	10	2	0	0	0
Paul Boutilier	D	28	0	11	11	36	18	0	0	0
Pat Flatley	RW	16	2	7	9	6	3	1	0	0
Billy Carroll	C	39	5	2	7	12	-1	0	0	2
Mats Hallin	LW	40	2	5	7	27	-2	0	0	0
Gord Lane	D	37	0	3	3	70	6	0	0	0
Mike McEwen	D	15	0	2	2	6	-5	0	0	0
Roland Melanson	G	37	0	2	2	10	0	0	0	0
Billy Smith	G	42	0	2	2	23	0	0	0	0
Garth MacGuigan	C	3	0	1	1	0	0	0	0	0
Darcy Regier	D	5	0	1	1	0	2	0	0	0
Bruce Affleck	D	1	0	0	0	0	-1	0	0	0
Kelly Hrudey	G	12	0	0	0	0	0	0	0	0

Goaltending

Player	MIN	GP	W	L	T	GA	GAA	SO
Billy Smith	2279	42	23	13	2	130	3.42	2
Roland Melanson	2019	37	20	11	2	110	3.27	0
Kelly Hrudey	535	12	7	2	0	28	3.14	0
Team:	4833	80	50	26	4	268	3.33	2

Playoffs
Scoring

Player	Pos	GP	G	A	Pts	PIM	PPG	SHG	GWG
Clark Gillies	LW	21	12	7	19	19	3	0	0
Mike Bossy	RW	21	8	10	18	4	2	0	3
Pat Flatley	RW	21	9	6	15	14	1	0	1
Bryan Trottier	C	21	8	6	14	49	1	0	0
Brent Sutter	C	20	4	10	14	18	0	1	3
Greg Gilbert	LW	21	5	7	12	39	2	0	1
Pat LaFontaine	C	16	3	6	9	8	0	0	0
Tomas Jonsson	D	21	3	5	8	22	2	0	0
Paul Boutilier	D	21	1	7	8	10	0	0	1
Butch Goring	C	21	1	5	6	2	1	0	0
Denis Potvin	D	20	1	5	6	28	1	0	0
Stefan Persson	D	16	0	6	6	2	0	0	0
Anders Kallur	RW	17	2	2	4	2	0	1	1
Duane Sutter	RW	21	1	3	4	48	0	0	0
John Tonelli	LW	17	1	3	4	31	0	0	0
Dave Langevin	D	12	0	4	4	18	0	0	0
Ken Morrow	D	20	1	2	3	20	0	0	1
Bob Bourne	C	8	1	1	2	7	0	0	1
Gord Dineen	D	9	1	1	2	28	0	0	0
Bob Nystrom	RW	15	0	2	2	8	0	0	0
Billy Carroll	C	5	0	0	0	0	0	0	0
Mats Hallin	LW	6	0	0	0	7	0	0	0
Gord Lane	D	4	0	0	0	2	0	0	0
Roland Melanson	G	6	0	0	0	2	0	0	0
Wayne Merrick	C	1	0	0	0	0	0	0	0
Billy Smith	G	21	0	0	0	17	0	0	0

Goaltending

Player	MIN	GP	W	L	GA	GAA	SO
Billy Smith	1190	21	12	8	54	2.72	0
Roland Melanson	87	6	0	1	5	3.45	0
Team:	1277	21	12	9	59	2.77	0

Note: Pos = Position; GP = Games played; G = Goals; A = Assists; Pts = Points; +/- = plus/minus; PIM = Penalty minutes; PPG = Power-play goals; SHG = Short-handed goals; GWG = Game-winning goals
MIN = Minutes played; W = Wins; L = Losses; T = Ties; GA = Goals-against; GAA = Goals-against average; SO = Shutouts;

== Playoffs ==
=== Stanley Cup Final ===
New York Islanders vs. Edmonton Oilers

Date	Visitors	Score	Home	Score	Notes
May 10	Edmonton	1	New York	0	
May 12	Edmonton	1	New York	6	
May 15	New York	2	Edmonton	7	
May 17	New York	2	Edmonton	7	
May 19	New York	2	Edmonton	5	

Edmonton wins the series 4–1.

== Awards and records ==
- Prince of Wales Trophy
- Lady Byng Memorial Trophy: Mike Bossy
- Mike Bossy, Right Wing, NHL First All-Star Team
- Denis Potvin, Defense, NHL Second All-Star Team
- Bryan Trottier, Center, NHL Second All-Star Team
