= 1983–84 Los Angeles Kings season =

National Hockey League team season

1983–84 Los Angeles Kings
- Division: 5th Smythe
- Conference: 10th Campbell
- 1983–84 record: 23–44–13
- Home record: 13–19–8
- Road record: 10–25–5
- Goals for: 309
- Goals against: 376

Team information
- General manager: George Maguire (Oct-Jan); Rogatien Vachon (Jan-Apr)
- Coach: Don Perry
- Captain: Terry Ruskowski
- Alternate captains: None
- Arena: The Forum
- Average attendance: 10,495

Team leaders
- Goals: Charlie Simmer (44)
- Assists: Bernie Nicholls (54)
- Points: Bernie Nicholls (95)
- Penalty minutes: Jay Wells (141)
- Plus/minus: Marcel Dionne; Charlie Simmer (+7)
- Wins: Mike Blake (9)
- Goals against average: Mike Blake (4.34)

The 1983–84 Los Angeles Kings season, was the Kings' 17th season in the National Hockey League (NHL). It saw the Kings miss the playoffs, finishing fifth in the Smythe Division. It was the last season of the Triple Crown line of Marcel Dionne, Charlie Simmer and Dave Taylor as Simmer would be traded before the next season. All three would be named to the NHL All-Star game.

== Regular season ==
=== Final standings ===
Smythe Division
	GP	W	L	T	GF	GA	Pts
**Edmonton Oilers**	80	57	18	5	446	314	119
**Calgary Flames**	80	34	32	14	311	314	82
**Vancouver Canucks**	80	32	39	9	306	328	73
**Winnipeg Jets**	80	31	38	11	340	374	73
Los Angeles Kings	80	23	44	13	309	376	59

Note: GP = Games played, W = Wins, L = Losses, T = Ties, Pts = Points, GF = Goals for, GA = Goals against
Note: Teams that qualified for the playoffs are highlighted in bold.

=== Record vs. opponents ===
Smythe Division record vs. opponents

==== Vs. Campbell Conference ====
**Vs. Smythe Division**

1983–84 NHL records
Team	**CGY**	**EDM**	**LAK**	**VAN**	**WIN**	**Total**
Calgary	—	0−7−1	4−3−1	5−2−1	4−1−3	**13−13−6**
Edmonton	7−0−1	—	6−2	6−1−1	8−0	**27−3−2**
Los Angeles	3−4−1	2−6	—	4−3−1	0−5−3	**9−18−5**
Vancouver	2−5−1	1−6−1	3−4−1	—	5−2−1	**11−17−4**
Winnipeg	1−4−3	0−8	5−0−3	2−5−1	—	**8−17−7**

**Vs. Norris Division**

1983–84 NHL records
Team	**CHI**	**DET**	**MIN**	**STL**	**TOR**	**Total**
Calgary	2−1	1−2	2−1	2−0−1	1−0−2	**8−4−3**
Edmonton	2−1	3−0	2−0−1	1−2	2−1	**10−4−1**
Los Angeles	3−0	2−0−1	1−1−1	1−1−1	0−2−1	**7−4−4**
Vancouver	1−2	2−1	1−1−1	1−2	1−0−2	**6−6−3**
Winnipeg	2−1	0−1−2	1−2	2−1	3−0	**8−5−2**

**Vs. Wales Conference**

**Vs. Adams Division**

1983–84 NHL records
Team	**BOS**	**BUF**	**HFD**	**MTL**	**QUE**	**Total**
Calgary	0−2−1	0−3	2−0−1	1−2	1−2	**4−9−2**
Edmonton	2−1	2−1	2−1	2−1	3−0	**11−4−0**
Los Angeles	0−3	0−2−1	1−2	2−1	0−3	**3−11−1**
Vancouver	0−2−1	0−3	3−0	2−1	2−1	**7−7−1**
Winnipeg	1−2	0−3	2−0−1	1−1−1	2−1	**6−7−2**

**Vs. Patrick Division**

1983–84 NHL records
Team	**NJD**	**NYI**	**NYR**	**PHI**	**PIT**	**WSH**	**Total**
Calgary	2−0−1	3−0	1−2	1−2	1−0−2	1−2	**9−6−3**
Edmonton	2−0−1	0−3	2−1	0−2−1	3−0	2−1	**9−7−2**
Los Angeles	1−2	0−2−1	0−1−2	1−2	2−1	0−3	**4−11−3**
Vancouver	2−1	0−3	1−1–1	2−1	2−1	1−2	**8−9−1**
Winnipeg	2−1	2−1	1−2	1−2	2−1	1−2	**9−9−0**

== Schedule and results ==
1983–84 regular season
October

Game	Result	Date	Score	Opponent	Record
1	T	October 5, 1983	3–3 OT	Minnesota North Stars (1983–84)	0–0–1
2	L	October 8, 1983	3–6	Toronto Maple Leafs (1983–84)	0–1–1
3	L	October 10, 1983	1–2	@ New York Rangers (1983–84)	0–2–1
4	L	October 11, 1983	2–5	@ New York Islanders (1983–84)	0–3–1
5	L	October 13, 1983	4–7	@ St. Louis Blues (1983–84)	0–4–1
6	T	October 15, 1983	3–3 OT	Detroit Red Wings (1983–84)	0–4–2
7	W	October 20, 1983	7–2	Edmonton Oilers (1983–84)	1–4–2
8	W	October 22, 1983	8–3	New Jersey Devils (1983–84)	2–4–2
9	L	October 25, 1983	5–8	Hartford Whalers (1983–84)	2–5–2
10	T	October 28, 1983	3–3 OT	@ Buffalo Sabres (1983–84)	2–5–3
11	T	October 29, 1983	5–5 OT	@ Toronto Maple Leafs (1983–84)	2–5–4

November

Game	Result	Date	Score	Opponent	Record
12	L	November 1, 1983	4–8	@ Quebec Nordiques (1983–84)	2–6–4
13	W	November 3, 1983	6–5	@ Philadelphia Flyers (1983–84)	3–6–4
14	L	November 5, 1983	1–2	@ Hartford Whalers (1983–84)	3–7–4
15	L	November 6, 1983	3–7	@ Boston Bruins (1983–84)	3–8–4
16	T	November 8, 1983	5–5 OT	St. Louis Blues (1983–84)	3–8–5
17	W	November 10, 1983	6–2	St. Louis Blues (1983–84)	4–8–5
18	W	November 12, 1983	6–4	Montreal Canadiens (1983–84)	5–8–5
19	W	November 16, 1983	5–2	Vancouver Canucks (1983–84)	6–8–5
20	W	November 18, 1983	5–2	@ Vancouver Canucks (1983–84)	7–8–5
21	L	November 20, 1983	3–8	@ Vancouver Canucks (1983–84)	7–9–5
22	L	November 21, 1983	4–7	@ Calgary Flames (1983–84)	7–10–5
23	L	November 23, 1983	3–7	Edmonton Oilers (1983–84)	7–11–5
24	L	November 26, 1983	1–4	Calgary Flames (1983–84)	7–12–5
25	L	November 29, 1983	5–6	Winnipeg Jets (1983–84)	7–13–5

December

Game	Result	Date	Score	Opponent	Record
26	L	December 1, 1983	5–6 OT	Winnipeg Jets (1983–84)	7–14–5
27	L	December 3, 1983	3–7	@ Edmonton Oilers (1983–84)	7–15–5
28	L	December 4, 1983	5–7	@ Winnipeg Jets (1983–84)	7–16–5
29	T	December 7, 1983	4–4 OT	New York Islanders (1983–84)	7–16–6
30	L	December 10, 1983	4–6	Quebec Nordiques (1983–84)	7–17–6
31	W	December 13, 1983	7–5	@ Detroit Red Wings (1983–84)	8–17–6
32	W	December 14, 1983	6–5	@ Chicago Black Hawks (1983–84)	9–17–6
33	W	December 17, 1983	6–5	@ Pittsburgh Penguins (1983–84)	10–17–6
34	L	December 18, 1983	0–5	@ Washington Capitals (1983–84)	10–18–6
35	W	December 21, 1983	7–4	Calgary Flames (1983–84)	11–18–6
36	W	December 26, 1983	5–4 OT	@ Vancouver Canucks (1983–84)	12–18–6
37	L	December 28, 1983	5–6 OT	New York Islanders (1983–84)	12–19–6
38	W	December 30, 1983	9–3	@ Hartford Whalers (1983–84)	13–19–6
39	L	December 31, 1983	3–5	@ Toronto Maple Leafs (1983–84)	13–20–6

January

Game	Result	Date	Score	Opponent	Record
40	L	January 3, 1984	3–4	Vancouver Canucks (1983–84)	13–21–6
41	T	January 4, 1984	3–3 OT	Vancouver Canucks (1983–84)	13–21–7
42	W	January 7, 1984	7–1	Calgary Flames (1983–84)	14–21–7
43	L	January 11, 1984	2–4	Washington Capitals (1983–84)	14–22–7
44	T	January 13, 1984	7–7 OT	@ Winnipeg Jets (1983–84)	14–22–8
45	T	January 15, 1984	4–4 OT	@ Winnipeg Jets (1983–84)	14–22–9
46	L	January 16, 1984	3–9	@ Minnesota North Stars (1983–84)	14–23–9
47	L	January 18, 1984	0–4	Buffalo Sabres (1983–84)	14–24–9
48	L	January 20, 1984	5–7	@ Edmonton Oilers (1983–84)	14–25–9
49	L	January 21, 1984	3–6	Edmonton Oilers (1983–84)	14–26–9
50	L	January 25, 1984	2–5	Philadelphia Flyers (1983–84)	14–27–9
51	T	January 27, 1984	2–2 OT	@ Calgary Flames (1983–84)	14–27–10
52	W	January 28, 1984	4–2	@ Edmonton Oilers (1983–84)	15–27–10

February

Game	Result	Date	Score	Opponent	Record
53	W	February 2, 1984	4–2	Vancouver Canucks (1983–84)	16–27–10
54	T	February 5, 1984	3–3 OT	New York Rangers (1983–84)	16–27–11
55	W	February 8, 1984	1–0	Chicago Black Hawks (1983–84)	17–27–11
56	T	February 11, 1984	6–6 OT	New York Rangers (1983–84)	17–27–12
57	L	February 13, 1984	3–5	@ Montreal Canadiens (1983–84)	17–28–12
58	L	February 14, 1984	4–6	@ New Jersey Devils (1983–84)	17–29–12
59	L	February 16, 1984	2–4	Washington Capitals (1983–84)	17–30–12
60	W	February 18, 1984	5–3	Montreal Canadiens (1983–84)	18–30–12
61	W	February 20, 1984	3–2	@ Minnesota North Stars (1983–84)	19–30–12
62	L	February 22, 1984	3–6	Boston Bruins (1983–84)	19–31–12
63	L	February 24, 1984	3–5	@ Vancouver Canucks (1983–84)	19–32–12
64	L	February 26, 1984	2–5	Calgary Flames (1983–84)	19–33–12
65	L	February 28, 1984	1–9	@ Calgary Flames (1983–84)	19–34–12

March

Game	Result	Date	Score	Opponent	Record
66	L	March 1, 1984	3–4 OT	@ Boston Bruins (1983–84)	19–35–12
67	L	March 3, 1984	3–4	@ Pittsburgh Penguins (1983–84)	19–36–12
68	L	March 4, 1984	3–5	@ New Jersey Devils (1983–84)	19–37–12
69	L	March 6, 1984	3–7	Winnipeg Jets (1983–84)	19–38–12
70	L	March 8, 1984	1–4	@ Philadelphia Flyers (1983–84)	19–39–12
71	L	March 9, 1984	3–7	@ Buffalo Sabres (1983–84)	19–40–12
72	W	March 11, 1984	4–3	Chicago Black Hawks (1983–84)	20–40–12
73	W	March 14, 1984	7–6	Pittsburgh Penguins (1983–84)	21–40–12
74	L	March 16, 1984	4–5	@ Winnipeg Jets (1983–84)	21–41–12
75	L	March 17, 1984	1–9	@ Edmonton Oilers (1983–84)	21–42–12
76	L	March 20, 1984	1–3	Quebec Nordiques (1983–84)	21–43–12
77	W	March 24, 1984	9–7	Detroit Red Wings (1983–84)	22–43–12
78	T	March 27, 1984	3–3 OT	Winnipeg Jets (1983–84)	22–43–13
79	W	March 29, 1984	6–3	@ Calgary Flames (1983–84)	23–43–13
80	L	March 31, 1984	3–4	Edmonton Oilers (1983–84)	23–44–13

Legend: Win (2 points) Loss (0 points) Tie (1 point)

== Player statistics ==
Regular season
Scoring

Player	Pos	GP	G	A	Pts	PIM	+/-	PPG	SHG	GWG
Bernie Nicholls	C	78	41	54	95	83	-21	8	4	2
Charlie Simmer	LW	79	44	48	92	78	7	13	1	4
Marcel Dionne	C	66	39	53	92	28	8	13	0	2
Jim Fox	RW	80	30	42	72	26	-12	10	0	5
Dave Taylor	RW	63	20	49	69	91	-3	6	0	2
Brian MacLellan	LW	72	25	29	54	45	-21	3	1	1
Mark Hardy	D	79	8	41	49	122	-30	5	0	1
Doug Smith	C	72	16	20	36	28	-33	6	0	0
Mike McEwen	D	47	10	24	34	14	-12	7	0	0
Anders Hakansson	LW	80	15	17	32	41	-7	0	1	3
Terry Ruskowski	C	77	7	25	32	89	-24	0	2	1
Brian Engblom	D	74	2	27	29	59	-9	2	0	0
Wes Jarvis	C	61	9	13	22	36	-7	1	1	0
John Paul Kelly	LW	72	7	14	21	73	-34	0	0	0
Jay Wells	D	69	3	18	21	141	-10	0	0	0
Russ Anderson	D	70	5	12	17	126	-30	0	0	1
Ken Houston	RW	33	8	8	16	11	-3	0	0	0
Steve Christoff	C	58	8	7	15	13	-19	0	0	1
Marc Chorney	D	71	3	9	12	58	-24	0	0	0
Kevin LaVallee	LW	19	3	3	6	2	-5	0	0	0
Billy Harris	RW	21	2	4	6	6	-3	0	0	0
Dean Kennedy	D	37	1	5	6	50	-5	0	0	0
Larry Murphy	D	6	0	3	3	0	-4	0	0	0
Fred Barrett	D	15	2	0	2	8	-2	0	0	0
Marco Baron	G	21	0	2	2	10	0	0	0	0
Bob LaForest	RW	5	1	0	1	2	-3	1	0	0
Mike Blake	G	29	0	1	1	6	0	0	0	0
Daryl Evans	LW	4	0	1	1	0	1	0	0	0
Mike Heidt	D	6	0	1	1	7	-1	0	0	0
Dan Brennan	LW	2	0	0	0	0	-1	0	0	0
Warren Holmes	C	3	0	0	0	0	-3	0	0	0
Dean Jenkins	RW	5	0	0	0	2	-1	0	0	0
Gary Laskoski	G	13	0	0	0	0	0	0	0	0
Mario Lessard	G	6	0	0	0	0	0	0	0	0
Markus Mattsson	G	19	0	0	0	0	0	0	0	0
Bill O'Dwyer	C	5	0	0	0	0	1	0	0	0
Phil Sykes	LW	3	0	0	0	2	-1	0	0	0

Goaltending

Player	MIN	GP	W	L	T	GA	GAA	SO
Mike Blake	1634	29	9	11	5	118	4.33	0
Markus Mattsson	1101	19	7	8	2	79	4.31	1
Gary Laskoski	665	13	4	7	1	55	4.96	0
Marco Baron	1211	21	3	14	4	87	4.31	0
Mario Lessard	266	6	0	4	1	26	5.86	0
Team:	4877	80	23	44	13	365	4.49	1

Note:

Pos = Position;GP = Games played; G = Goals; A = Assists; Pts = Points; PIM = Penalty minutes; +/- = Plus/minus; PPG = Power-play goals; SHG = Short-handed goals; GWG = Game-winning goals
Pos = Position;GP = Games played; Min, TOI = Minutes played; W = Wins; L = Losses; T,T/OT = Ties; OTL = Overtime losses; GA = Goals-against; GAA = Goals-against average; SO = Shutouts; SA = Shots against; SV = Shots saved;SV% = Save percentage;

== Transactions ==
The Kings were involved in the following transactions during the 1983–84 season.

=== Trades ===
June 8, 1983	To Los Angeles Kings 4th round pick in 1984 – Doug Wieck	To Detroit Red Wings 4th round pick in 1983 – Dave Korol
June 20, 1983	To Los Angeles Kings Kevin LaVallee; Carl Mokosak	To Calgary Flames Steve Bozek
September 9, 1983	To Los Angeles Kings Anders Hakansson	To Pittsburgh Penguins Kevin Stevens
October 3, 1983	To Los Angeles Kings Fred Barrett; Steve Christoff	To Minnesota North Stars Dave Lewis
October 15, 1983	To Los Angeles Kings Marc Chorney	To Pittsburgh Penguins 6th round pick in 1985 – Stuart-Lee Marston
October 18, 1983	To Los Angeles Kings Brian Engblom; Ken Houston	To Washington Capitals Larry Murphy
November 17, 1983	To Los Angeles Kings Mike McEwen	To New York Islanders 4th round pick in 1984 – Doug Wieck
December 20, 1983	To Los Angeles Kings John Goodwin	To Montreal Canadiens Dan Bonar
January 3, 1984	To Los Angeles Kings Marco Baron	To Boston Bruins Bob Laforest
February 15, 1984	To Los Angeles Kings Billy Harris	To Toronto Maple Leafs Cash

=== Free agent signings ===
August 10, 1983	From Detroit Red Wings Mark Lofthouse
August 10, 1983	From Minnesota North Stars Wes Jarvis
August 29, 1983	From Hartford Whalers Archie Henderson
September 2, 1983	From Hartford Whalers Russ Anderson

=== Free agents lost ===
September 12, 1983	To Pittsburgh Penguins Bob Gladney
October 17, 1983	To Minnesota North Stars Jerry Korab

=== Waivers ===
May 24, 1983	To Boston Bruins Doug Keans
October 3, 1983	From Edmonton Oilers Don Nachbaur

== Draft picks ==
Los Angeles's draft picks at the 1983 NHL entry draft held at the Montreal Forum in Montreal.

Round	#	Player	Nationality	College/Junior/Club team (League)
3	47	Bruce Shoebottom	Canada	Peterborough Petes (OHL)
4	67	Guy Benoit	Canada	Shawinigan Cataractes (QMJHL)
5	87	Bob LaForest	Canada	North Bay Centennials (OHL)
5	100	Garry Galley	Canada	Bowling Green University (CCHA)
6	107	Dave Lundmark	United States	Virginia High School (USHS-MN)
6	108	Kevin Stevens	United States	Silver Lake High School (USHS-MA)
7	127	Tim Burgess	Canada	Oshawa Generals (OHL)
8	147	Ken Hammond	Canada	Rensselaer Polytechnic Institute (ECAC)
9	167	Bruce Fishback	United States	White Bear Lake High School (USHS-MN)
10	187	Thomas Ahlen	Sweden	Skelleftea AIK (Sweden)
11	207	Jan Blaha	Czechoslovakia	České Budějovice (Czechoslovakia)
12	227	Chad Johnson	United States	Roseau High School (USHS-MN)

== See also ==
- 1983–84 NHL season
