= 1983–84 Minnesota North Stars season =

National Hockey League team season

1983–84 Minnesota North Stars
- Norris Division champions
- Division: 1st Norris
- Conference: 2nd Campbell
- 1983–84 record: 39–31–10
- Home record: 22–14–4
- Road record: 17–17–6
- Goals for: 345
- Goals against: 344

Team information
- General manager: Lou Nanne
- Coach: Bill Mahoney
- Captain: Craig Hartsburg; Brian Bellows (interim)
- Alternate captains: None
- Arena: Met Center

Team leaders
- Goals: Brian Bellows (41)
- Assists: Neal Broten (61)
- Points: Neal Broten (89)
- Penalty minutes: Willi Plett (316)
- Plus/minus: Tom McCarthy (+17)
- Wins: Gilles Meloche (21)
- Goals against average: Don Beaupre (4.12)

The 1983–84 Minnesota North Stars season was the North Stars' 17th season.

Coached by Bill Mahoney, the team compiled a record of 39–31–10 for 88 points, to finish the regular season 1st in the Norris Division for the second time in three seasons, doing so as the only team in their division to have a winning record that season. In the playoffs, they won their Norris Division Semifinal series 3 games to 2 over the Chicago Black Hawks and followed that with a seven-game win over the St. Louis Blues in the Norris Division Final. In the Campbell Conference Final, the North Stars ran out of magic as they were swept in four straight games by the eventual Stanley Cup champion Edmonton Oilers.

== Offseason ==
=== NHL draft ===
Round	Pick	Player	Nationality	College/junior/club team
1	1	Brian Lawton	United States	Mount St. Charles Academy (USHS-RI)
2	36	Malcolm Parks	Canada	St. Alberts Saints (AJHL)
2	38	Frank Musil	Czechoslovakia	Pardubice (Czechoslovakia)
3	56	Mitch Messier	Canada	Notre Dame Hounds (SJHL)
4	76	Brian Durand	United States	Cloquet High School (USHS-MN)
5	96	Rich Geist	United States	St. Paul Academy (USHS-MN)
6	116	Tom McComb	United States	Mount St. Charles Academy (USHS-RI)
7	136	Sean Toomey	United States	Cretin-Derham Hall High School (USHS-MN)
8	156	Don Biggs	Canada	Oshawa Generals (OHL)
9	176	Paul Pulis	United States	Hibbing High School (USHS-MN)
10	196	Milos Riha	Czechoslovakia	Vitkovice (Czechoslovakia)
11	212	Oldrich Valek	Czechoslovakia	Jihlava (Czechoslovakia)
12	236	Paul Roff	United States	Edina High School (USHS-MN)

== Regular season ==
Bob Rouse, Brian Lawton, and Dirk Graham all made their NHL debuts.

=== Final standings ===
Norris Division
	GP	W	L	T	GF	GA	Pts
**Minnesota North Stars**	80	39	31	10	345	344	88
**St. Louis Blues**	80	32	41	7	293	316	71
**Detroit Red Wings**	80	31	42	7	298	323	69
**Chicago Black Hawks**	80	30	42	8	277	311	68
Toronto Maple Leafs	80	26	45	9	303	387	61

Note: GP = Games played, W = Wins, L = Losses, T = Ties, Pts = Points, GF = Goals for, GA = Goals against
Note: Teams that qualified for the playoffs are highlighted in bold.

=== Record vs. opponents ===
Norris Division record vs. opponents

==== Vs. Campbell Conference ====
**Vs. Norris Division**

1983–84 NHL records
Team	**CHI**	**DET**	**MIN**	**STL**	**TOR**	**Total**
Chicago	—	4−4	2−6	4−3−1	5−2−1	**15−15−2**
Detroit	4−4	—	2−6	5−3	3−5	**14−18−0**
Minnesota	6−2	6−2	—	5−2−1	5−2−1	**22−8−2**
St. Louis	3−4−1	3−5	2−5−1	—	6−2	**14−16−2**
Toronto	2−5−1	5−3	2−5−1	2−6	—	**11−19−2**

**Vs. Smythe Division**

1983–84 NHL records
Team	**CGY**	**EDM**	**LAK**	**VAN**	**WIN**	**Total**
Chicago	1−2	1−2	0−3	2−1	1−2	**5−10−0**
Detroit	2−1	0−3	0−2−1	1−2	1−0−2	**4−8−3**
Minnesota	1−2	0−2−1	1−1−1	1−1−1	2−1	**5−7−3**
St. Louis	0−2−1	2−1	1−1−1	2−1	1−2	**6−7−2**
Toronto	0−1−2	1−2	2−0−1	0−1−2	0−3	**3−7−5**

==== Vs. Wales Conference ====
**Vs. Adams Division**

1983–84 NHL records
Team	**BOS**	**BUF**	**HFD**	**MTL**	**QUE**	**Total**
Chicago	2−1	2−1	1−2	0−2−1	1−1−1	**6−7−2**
Detroit	1−2	1−1−1	1−1−1	0−3	2−1	**5−8−2**
Minnesota	2−1	2−1	0−3	2−1	0−2−1	**6−8−1**
St. Louis	0−3	1−2	1−2	0−3	0−2−1	**2−12−1**
Toronto	2−1	0−2−1	1−2	1−2	1−2	**5−9−1**

**Vs. Patrick Division**

1983–84 NHL records
Team	**NJD**	**NYI**	**NYR**	**PHI**	**PIT**	**WSH**	**Total**
Chicago	1−2	0−3	1−2	0−1−2	1−1−1	1−1−1	**4−10−4**
Detroit	1−2	2−1	0−3	0−1−2	3−0	2−1	**8−8−2**
Minnesota	2−1	0−2−1	1−1−1	1−0−2	2−1	0−3	**6−8−4**
St. Louis	3−0	1−1−1	1−2	2−1	2−0−1	1−2	**10−6−2**
Toronto	3−0	1−2	2−1	0−3	1−1−1	0−3	**7−10−1**

== Schedule and results ==
1983–84 regular season
October

Game	Result	Date	Score	Opponent	Record
1	T	October 5, 1983	3–3 OT	@ Los Angeles Kings (1983–84)	0–0–1
2	L	October 7, 1983	9–10	@ Vancouver Canucks (1983–84)	0–1–1
3	L	October 9, 1983	3–4 OT	@ Edmonton Oilers (1983–84)	0–2–1
4	W	October 12, 1983	7–5	Calgary Flames (1983–84)	1–2–1
5	W	October 15, 1983	2–1	Winnipeg Jets (1983–84)	2–2–1
6	L	October 16, 1983	3–4	@ Chicago Black Hawks (1983–84)	2–3–1
7	L	October 20, 1983	4–5 OT	Montreal Canadiens (1983–84)	2–4–1
8	L	October 22, 1983	2–11	@ Quebec Nordiques (1983–84)	2–5–1
9	W	October 25, 1983	4–3	@ Montreal Canadiens (1983–84)	3–5–1
10	L	October 27, 1983	1–8	Boston Bruins (1983–84)	3–6–1
11	L	October 29, 1983	1–6	Washington Capitals (1983–84)	3–7–1

November

Game	Result	Date	Score	Opponent	Record
12	W	November 2, 1983	8–5	Toronto Maple Leafs (1983–84)	4–7–1
13	W	November 5, 1983	10–5	Chicago Black Hawks (1983–84)	5–7–1
14	L	November 8, 1983	4–6	@ Hartford Whalers (1983–84)	5–8–1
15	W	November 9, 1983	5–3	@ Detroit Red Wings (1983–84)	6–8–1
16	W	November 12, 1983	5–2	St. Louis Blues (1983–84)	7–8–1
17	W	November 15, 1983	6–0	New Jersey Devils (1983–84)	8–8–1
18	T	November 17, 1983	5–5 OT	@ Philadelphia Flyers (1983–84)	8–8–2
19	W	November 19, 1983	8–7 OT	Winnipeg Jets (1983–84)	9–8–2
20	W	November 20, 1983	4–3	@ Chicago Black Hawks (1983–84)	10–8–2
21	L	November 23, 1983	4–6	Toronto Maple Leafs (1983–84)	10–9–2
22	T	November 25, 1983	2–2 OT	Edmonton Oilers (1983–84)	10–9–3
23	W	November 26, 1983	7–6 OT	@ Toronto Maple Leafs (1983–84)	11–9–3
24	W	November 29, 1983	6–4	Pittsburgh Penguins (1983–84)	12–9–3

December

Game	Result	Date	Score	Opponent	Record
25	W	December 1, 1983	6–4	@ Pittsburgh Penguins (1983–84)	13–9–3
26	W	December 3, 1983	6–2	@ Boston Bruins (1983–84)	14–9–3
27	L	December 4, 1983	4–6	@ New York Rangers (1983–84)	14–10–3
28	W	December 7, 1983	7–2	Detroit Red Wings (1983–84)	15–10–3
29	L	December 10, 1983	2–4	New York Islanders (1983–84)	15–11–3
30	T	December 14, 1983	4–4 OT	St. Louis Blues (1983–84)	15–11–4
31	L	December 17, 1983	0–2	New Jersey Devils (1983–84)	15–12–4
32	W	December 20, 1983	5–2	@ St. Louis Blues (1983–84)	16–12–4
33	W	December 22, 1983	4–2	@ Boston Bruins (1983–84)	17–12–4
34	L	December 23, 1983	3–5	@ Hartford Whalers (1983–84)	17–13–4
35	L	December 26, 1983	1–5	@ Winnipeg Jets (1983–84)	17–14–4
36	W	December 28, 1983	8–6	Toronto Maple Leafs (1983–84)	18–14–4
37	L	December 31, 1983	3–7	New York Islanders (1983–84)	18–15–4

January

Game	Result	Date	Score	Opponent	Record
38	W	January 2, 1984	6–5	Chicago Black Hawks (1983–84)	19–15–4
39	L	January 4, 1984	8–12	@ Edmonton Oilers (1983–84)	19–16–4
40	L	January 5, 1984	4–5	@ Calgary Flames (1983–84)	19–17–4
41	W	January 7, 1984	2–0	Vancouver Canucks (1983–84)	20–17–4
42	L	January 10, 1984	3–6	Hartford Whalers (1983–84)	20–18–4
43	W	January 12, 1984	5–4 OT	Toronto Maple Leafs (1983–84)	21–18–4
44	W	January 14, 1984	4–2	@ St. Louis Blues (1983–84)	22–18–4
45	W	January 16, 1984	9–3	Los Angeles Kings (1983–84)	23–18–4
46	L	January 18, 1984	4–9	@ Toronto Maple Leafs (1983–84)	23–19–4
47	W	January 20, 1984	8–5	@ Detroit Red Wings (1983–84)	24–19–4
48	W	January 21, 1984	5–1	Detroit Red Wings (1983–84)	25–19–4
49	W	January 25, 1984	5–3	@ Chicago Black Hawks (1983–84)	26–19–4
50	W	January 27, 1984	10–8	@ St. Louis Blues (1983–84)	27–19–4
51	L	January 28, 1984	2–4	Chicago Black Hawks (1983–84)	27–20–4

February

Game	Result	Date	Score	Opponent	Record
52	L	February 1, 1984	0–4	@ Pittsburgh Penguins (1983–84)	27–21–4
53	W	February 3, 1984	4–1	@ Buffalo Sabres (1983–84)	28–21–4
54	W	February 5, 1984	3–1	@ New Jersey Devils (1983–84)	29–21–4
55	T	February 9, 1984	4–4 OT	New York Rangers (1983–84)	29–21–5
56	L	February 11, 1984	4–6	Detroit Red Wings (1983–84)	29–22–5
57	L	February 13, 1984	0–4	Washington Capitals (1983–84)	29–23–5
58	W	February 15, 1984	3–1	@ Toronto Maple Leafs (1983–84)	30–23–5
59	L	February 17, 1984	4–5 OT	@ Buffalo Sabres (1983–84)	30–24–5
60	L	February 18, 1984	2–7	Quebec Nordiques (1983–84)	30–25–5
61	L	February 20, 1984	2–3	Los Angeles Kings (1983–84)	30–26–5
62	L	February 22, 1984	2–5	@ Detroit Red Wings (1983–84)	30–27–5
63	T	February 23, 1984	3–3 OT	@ Philadelphia Flyers (1983–84)	30–27–6
64	W	February 25, 1984	5–1	Buffalo Sabres (1983–84)	31–27–6
65	L	February 28, 1984	2–5	@ St. Louis Blues (1983–84)	31–28–6
66	L	February 29, 1984	5–7	St. Louis Blues (1983–84)	31–29–6

March

Game	Result	Date	Score	Opponent	Record
67	W	March 3, 1984	6–3	Chicago Black Hawks (1983–84)	32–29–6
68	W	March 5, 1984	5–1	Detroit Red Wings (1983–84)	33–29–6
69	W	March 7, 1984	6–3	New York Rangers (1983–84)	34–29–6
70	W	March 10, 1984	4–3	Philadelphia Flyers (1983–84)	35–29–6
71	W	March 12, 1984	7–6 OT	Montreal Canadiens (1983–84)	36–29–6
72	T	March 14, 1984	3–3 OT	@ Toronto Maple Leafs (1983–84)	36–29–7
73	W	March 17, 1984	4–3	@ Detroit Red Wings (1983–84)	37–29–7
74	T	March 18, 1984	5–5 OT	Quebec Nordiques (1983–84)	37–29–8
75	L	March 21, 1984	1–5	@ Washington Capitals (1983–84)	37–30–8
76	T	March 24, 1984	4–4 OT	@ New York Islanders (1983–84)	37–30–9
77	W	March 26, 1984	4–3 OT	St. Louis Blues (1983–84)	38–30–9
78	W	March 28, 1984	6–3	@ Chicago Black Hawks (1983–84)	39–30–9
79	T	March 30, 1984	3–3 OT	@ Vancouver Canucks (1983–84)	39–30–10
80	L	March 31, 1984	3–10	@ Calgary Flames (1983–84)	39–31–10

Legend: Win (2 points) Loss (0 points) Tie (1 point)

== Playoffs ==
1984 Stanley Cup playoffs
Norris Division Semifinals vs. (N4) Chicago Black Hawks – North Stars win 3–2

Game	Date	Visitor	Score	Home	Series
1	April 4	Chicago Black Hawks	3–1	Minnesota North Stars	0–1
2	April 5	Chicago Black Hawks	5–6	Minnesota North Stars	1–1
3	April 7	Minnesota North Stars	4–1	Chicago Black Hawks	2–1
4	April 8	Minnesota North Stars	3–4	Chicago Black Hawks	2–2
5	April 10	Chicago Black Hawks	4–1	Minnesota North Stars	3–2

Norris Division Finals vs. (N2) St. Louis Blues – North Stars win 4–3

Game	Date	Visitor	Score	Home	Series
1	April 12	St. Louis Blues	1–2	Minnesota North Stars	1–0
2	April 13	St. Louis Blues	4–3 (OT)	Minnesota North Stars	1–1
3	April 15	Minnesota North Stars	1–3	St. Louis Blues	1–2
4	April 16	Minnesota North Stars	3–2	St. Louis Blues	2–2
5	April 18	St. Louis Blues	0–6	Minnesota North Stars	3–2
6	April 20	Minnesota North Stars	0–4	St. Louis Blues	3–3
7	April 22	St. Louis Blues	3–4 (OT)	Minnesota North Stars	4–3

Campbell Conference Finals vs. (S1) Edmonton Oilers – Oilers win 4–0

Game	Date	Visitor	Score	Home	Series
1	April 24	Minnesota North Stars	1–7	Edmonton Oilers	0–1
2	April 26	Minnesota North Stars	3–4	Edmonton Oilers	0–2
3	April 28	Edmonton Oilers	8–5	Minnesota North Stars	0–3
4	May 1	Edmonton Oilers	3–1	Minnesota North Stars	0–4

Legend: Win Loss

== Player statistics ==
=== Skaters ===
Regular season
Player	GP	G	A	Pts	+/−	PIM
Neal Broten	76	28	61	89	15	43
Brian Bellows	78	41	42	83	–3	66
Brad Maxwell	78	19	54	73	–7	225
Dino Ciccarelli	79	38	33	71	1	58
Tom McCarthy	66	39	31	70	16	49
Dennis Maruk	71	17	43	60	–17	42
Steve Payne	78	28	31	59	0	49
Keith Acton^{†}	62	17	38	55	2	60
Gordie Roberts	77	8	45	53	14	132
Mark Napier^{†}	58	13	28	41	2	17
Willi Plett	73	15	23	38	–6	316
Al MacAdam	80	22	13	35	–3	23
Brian Lawton	58	10	21	31	1	33
Curt Giles	70	6	22	28	1	59
Craig Levie	37	6	13	19	9	44
Brent Ashton	68	7	10	17	–14	54
George Ferguson	63	6	10	16	–4	19
Lars Lindgren	59	2	14	16	–4	33
Craig Hartsburg	26	7	7	14	–2	37
Dan Mandich	31	2	7	9	–6	77
Bobby Smith^{‡}	10	3	6	9	–1	9
Paul Holmgren^{†}	11	2	5	7	–2	46
Jordy Douglas^{‡}	11	3	4	7	–2	10
Dave Richter	42	2	3	5	–7	132
Randy Velischek	33	2	2	4	–6	10
Tom Hirsch	15	1	3	4	–3	20
Dirk Graham	6	1	1	2	1	0
David Jensen	8	0	1	1	2	0
Total		345	571	916	—	1,663

Playoffs
Player	GP	G	A	Pts	+/−	PIM
Brian Bellows	16	2	12	14	–2	6
Brad Maxwell	16	2	11	13	–7	40
Keith Acton	15	4	7	11	–1	12
Gordie Roberts	15	3	7	10	2	23
Neal Broten	16	5	5	10	–4	4
Dennis Maruk	16	5	5	10	–6	8
Dino Ciccarelli	16	4	5	9	–6	27
Steve Payne	15	3	6	9	–4	18
Willi Plett	16	6	2	8	–2	51
Mark Napier	12	3	2	5	–4	0
Tom McCarthy	8	1	4	5	–2	6
Craig Levie	15	2	3	5	–2	32
Al MacAdam	16	1	4	5	2	7
Curt Giles	16	1	3	4	–2	25
Brent Ashton	12	1	2	3	–2	22
Lars Lindgren	15	2	0	2	2	6
George Ferguson	13	2	0	2	0	2
Paul Holmgren	12	0	1	1	0	6
Total		47	79	126	—	295

=== Goaltending ===
Regular season
Player	GP	W	L	T	GA	SO
Gilles Meloche	52	21	17	8	201	2
Don Beaupre	33	16	13	2	123	0
Jim Craig	3	1	1	0	9	0
Jon Casey	2	1	0	0	6	0
Total		39	31	10	339	2

Playoffs
Player	GP	W	L	T	GA	SO
Don Beaupre	13	6	7	0	40	1
Gilles Meloche	4	1	2	0	11	0
Total		7	9	0	51	1

^{†}Denotes player spent time with another team before joining the North Stars. Stats reflect time with the North Stars only.
^{‡}Denotes player was traded mid-season. Stats reflect time with the North Stars only.
