= Mal Davis =

Canadian ice hockey player (born 1956)

- Born: October 10, 1956 (age 69) Lockeport, Nova Scotia, Canada
- Height: 5 ft 11 in (180 cm)
- Weight: 180 lb (82 kg; 12 st 12 lb)
- Position: Right wing
- Shot: Right
- Played for: Buffalo Sabres
- NHL draft: Undrafted
- Playing career: 1978–1992

Malcolm Sterling Davis (born October 10, 1956) is a Canadian former professional ice hockey player. Davis played for the Buffalo Sabres of the National Hockey League and its American Hockey League farm team, the Rochester Americans, and later with TPS Turku in Finland.

Born in Lockeport, Nova Scotia, Davis played for the Amherst Ramblers, a junior team in Amherst, Nova Scotia, and then attended Saint Mary's University in Halifax, Nova Scotia where he was a member of the university's Huskies ice hockey team.

Davis won the Les Cunningham Award for 1983–84. The award is given to the American Hockey League's "Most Valuable Player" of the regular season, as voted on by AHL media and players.

== Career statistics ==
			Regular season					Playoffs
Season	Team	League	GP	G	A	Pts	PIM	GP	G	A	Pts	PIM
1975–76	Saint Mary's University	AUAA	20	11	7	18	21	—	—	—	—	—
1976–77	Saint Mary's University	AUAA	20	16	5	21	2	—	—	—	—	—
1977–78	Saint Mary's University	AUAA	20	23	13	36	8	—	—	—	—	—
1978–79	Detroit Red Wings	NHL	6	0	0	0	0	—	—	—	—	—
1978–79	Kansas City Red Wings	CHL	71	42	24	66	29	4	2	0	2	4
1979–80	Adirondack Red Wings	AHL	79	34	31	65	45	5	2	2	4	19
1980–81	Detroit Red Wings	NHL	5	2	0	2	0	—	—	—	—	—
1980–81	Adirondack Red Wings	AHL	58	23	12	35	48	17	6	4	10	9
1981–82	Rochester Americans	AHL	75	32	33	65	14	9	2	3	5	2
1982–83	Buffalo Sabres	NHL	24	8	12	20	0	6	1	0	1	0
1982–83	Rochester Americans	AHL	57	43	32	75	15	—	—	—	—	—
1983–84	Buffalo Sabres	NHL	11	2	1	3	4	1	0	0	0	0
1983–84	Rochester Americans	AHL	71	55	48	103	53	15	6	9	15	33
1984–85	Buffalo Sabres	NHL	47	17	9	26	26	—	—	—	—	—
1984–85	Rochester Americans	AHL	6	4	4	8	14	—	—	—	—	—
1985–86	Buffalo Sabres	NHL	7	2	0	2	4	—	—	—	—	—
1985–86	Rochester Americans	AHL	38	21	15	36	23	—	—	—	—	—
1986–87	TPS	SM-l	39	24	15	39	93	5	3	0	3	13
1987–88	TPS	SM-l	44	32	12	44	68	—	—	—	—	—
1988–89	TPS	SM-l	34	21	15	36	31	10	9	3	12	4
1988–89	Canada	Intl.	3	1	3	4	2	—	—	—	—	—
1989–90	TPS	SM-l	38	27	11	38	41	9	6	3	9	25
1990–91	TPS	SM-l	29	11	6	17	32	—	—	—	—	—
1990–91	Raisio HT	FIN III	2	2	1	3	0	—	—	—	—	—
1990–91	SC Langnau	SUI II	5	3	1	4	14	—	—	—	—	—
1991–92	EHC Essen-West	DEU II	18	19	7	26	43	4	6	3	9	4
NHL totals			100	31	22	53	34	7	1	0	1	0
AHL totals			384	212	175	387	212	46	16	18	34	63
SM-l totals			184	115	59	174	265	24	18	6	24	42
