= Jerry Dupont =

Canadian ice hockey player (born 1962)

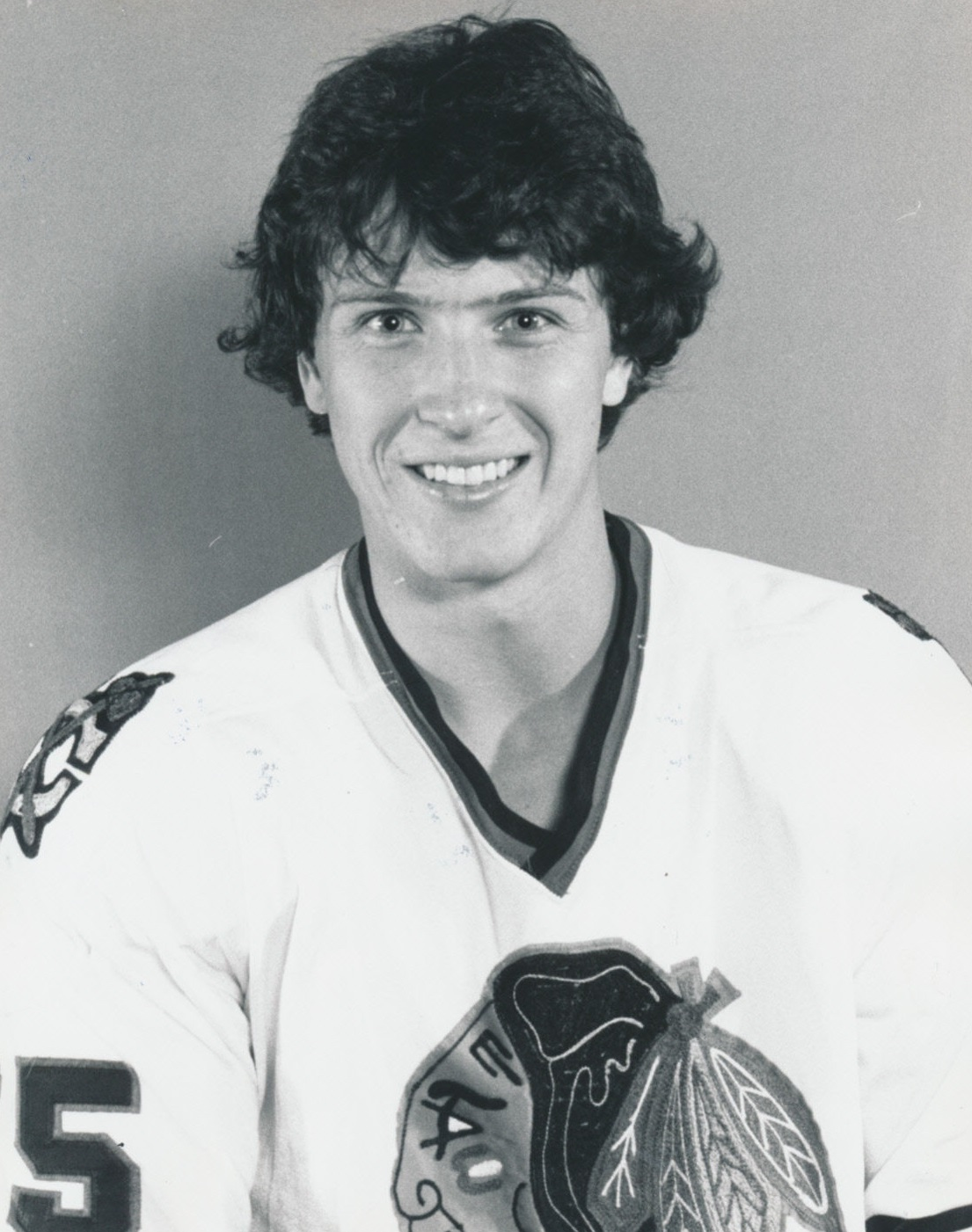
- Dupont in 1981
- Born: February 21, 1962 (age 64) Ottawa, Ontario, Canada
- Height: 6 ft 0 in (183 cm)
- Weight: 200 lb (91 kg; 14 st 4 lb)
- Position: Defence
- Shot: Left
- Played for: Chicago Blackhawks; Toronto Maple Leafs
- NHL draft: 15th overall, 1980; Chicago Blackhawks
- Playing career: 1981–1987

Jerome Robert Dupont (born February 21, 1962) is a former Canadian professional ice hockey defenceman.

== Biography ==
As a youth, Dupont played in the 1974 and 1975 Quebec International Pee-Wee Hockey Tournaments with a minor ice hockey team from Gloucester, Ontario.

Dupont played for the Toronto Marlboros of the Ontario Hockey League at the age of 16. He was drafted in the first round, 15th overall by the Chicago Black Hawks in the 1980 NHL entry draft. He retired in 1987 after seven years of NHL with the Blackhawks and the Toronto Maple Leafs and AHL hockey with the Springfield Indians and Newmarket Saints.

He started his junior coaching career with the 1998 Thornhill Rattlers of the Ontario Provincial Junior A Hockey League. Within two years the team won the Dudley Hewitt Cup as Central Canadian Junior "A" Champions. In 2006–07, as the coach of the Aurora Tigers, he led the team to the Dudley Hewitt Cup, and then later won the Royal Bank Cup 2007 as National Junior "A" Champions.

When Dupont played in the United States he was given the nickname Jerry, simply because Jerome wasn't a common name among his American teammates.

Dupont was head coach of the Gatineau Olympiques of Quebec Major Junior Hockey League for two seasons, ending in 2010. He was also head coach of the Cobourg Cougars of the Ontario Junior Hockey League for the 2018-19 season.

== Career statistics ==
=== Regular season and playoffs ===
			Regular season					Playoffs
Season	Team	League	GP	G	A	Pts	PIM	GP	G	A	Pts	PIM
1978–79	Markham Waxers	OPJHL	—	—	—	—	—	—	—	—	—	—
1978–79	Toronto Marlboros	OMJHL	68	5	21	26	49	3	0	0	0	0
1979–80	Toronto Marlboros	OMJHL	67	7	37	44	88	4	1	1	2	5
1980–81	Toronto Marlboros	OHL	67	6	38	44	116	5	2	2	4	9
1981–82	Chicago Black Hawks	NHL	34	0	4	4	51	—	—	—	—	—
1981–82	Toronto Marlboros	OHL	7	0	8	8	18	10	3	9	12	24
1982–83	Chicago Black Hawks	NHL	1	0	0	0	0	—	—	—	—	—
1982–83	Springfield Indians	AHL	78	12	22	34	114	—	—	—	—	—
1983–84	Chicago Black Hawks	NHL	36	2	2	4	116	4	0	0	0	15
1983–84	Springfield Indians	AHL	12	2	3	5	65	—	—	—	—	—
1984–85	Chicago Black Hawks	NHL	55	3	10	13	105	15	0	2	2	41
1985–86	Chicago Black Hawks	NHL	75	2	13	15	173	1	0	0	0	0
1986–87	Toronto Maple Leafs	NHL	13	0	0	0	23	—	—	—	—	—
1986–87	Newmarket Saints	AHL	29	1	8	9	47	—	—	—	—	—
AHL totals			119	15	33	48	226	—	—	—	—	—
NHL totals			214	7	29	36	468	20	0	2	2	56
