= 1983–84 AHL season =

- League: American Hockey League
- Sport: Ice hockey

Regular season
- F. G. "Teddy" Oke Trophy: Fredericton Express
- Season MVP: Garry Lariviere; Mal Davis
- Top scorer: Claude Larose
- MVP: Bud Stefanski

Playoffs
- Champions: Maine Mariners
- Runners-up: Rochester Americans

AHL seasons
- 1982–83 1984–85

The 1983–84 AHL season was the 48th season of the American Hockey League. Thirteen teams played 80 games each in the schedule. The league initiates two new awards. The Aldege "Baz" Bastien Memorial Award is first awarded to the league's "best goaltender." The Jack A. Butterfield Trophy is first awarded to the "MVP of the playoffs." The Baltimore Skipjacks finished first overall in the regular season. The Maine Mariners won their third Calder Cup championship.

== Final standings ==
- y– indicates team clinched division and a playoff spot
- x– indicates team clinched a playoff spot
- e– indicates team was eliminated from playoff contention

| North Division | GP | W | L | T | Pts | GF | GA |
|---|---|---|---|---|---|---|---|
| y–Fredericton Express (QUE/VAN) | 80 | 45 | 30 | 5 | 95 | 340 | 262 |
| x–Adirondack Red Wings (DET) | 80 | 37 | 29 | 14 | 88 | 344 | 330 |
| x–Maine Mariners (NJD) | 80 | 33 | 36 | 11 | 77 | 310 | 312 |
| x–Nova Scotia Voyageurs (MTL) | 80 | 32 | 37 | 11 | 75 | 277 | 288 |
| e–Moncton Alpines (EDM) | 80 | 32 | 40 | 8 | 72 | 251 | 278 |
| e–Sherbrooke Jets (WIN) | 80 | 22 | 53 | 5 | 49 | 301 | 419 |

| South Division | GP | W | L | T | Pts | GF | GA |
|---|---|---|---|---|---|---|---|
| y–Baltimore Skipjacks (PIT) | 80 | 46 | 24 | 10 | 102 | 384 | 304 |
| x–Rochester Americans (BUF) | 80 | 46 | 32 | 2 | 94 | 363 | 300 |
| x–St. Catharines Saints (TOR) | 80 | 43 | 31 | 6 | 92 | 364 | 346 |
| x–Springfield Indians (CHI/PHI/STL) | 80 | 39 | 35 | 6 | 84 | 344 | 340 |
| e–New Haven Nighthawks (LAK) | 80 | 36 | 40 | 4 | 76 | 365 | 371 |
| e–Binghamton Whalers (HFD) | 80 | 33 | 43 | 4 | 70 | 359 | 388 |
| e–Hershey Bears (BOS/WSH) | 80 | 28 | 42 | 10 | 66 | 320 | 384 |

== Scoring leaders ==
Note: GP = Games played; G = Goals; A = Assists; Pts = Points; PIM = Penalty minutes

| Player | Team | GP | G | A | Pts | PIM |
|---|---|---|---|---|---|---|
| Claude Larose | Sherbrooke Jets | 80 | 53 | 67 | 120 | 6 |
| Murray Eaves | Sherbrooke Jets | 78 | 47 | 68 | 115 | 40 |
| Mike Kaszycki | St. Catharines Saints | 72 | 39 | 71 | 110 | 51 |
| Bruce Boudreau | St. Catharines Saints | 80 | 47 | 62 | 109 | 44 |
| Ross Yates | Binghamton Whalers | 68 | 35 | 73 | 108 | 82 |
| Mal Davis | Rochester Americans | 71 | 55 | 48 | 103 | 53 |
| Mark Lofthouse | New Haven Nighthawks | 79 | 37 | 64 | 101 | 45 |
| Normand Aubin | St. Catharines Saints | 80 | 47 | 47 | 94 | 63 |
| Geordie Robertson | Rochester Americans | 64 | 37 | 54 | 91 | 103 |
| Claude Verret | Rochester Americans | 65 | 39 | 51 | 90 | 4 |

- complete list

== Calder Cup playoffs ==
Division Semifinals
1 | Fredericton | 3
4 | Nova Scotia | 4
North Division
2 | Adirondack | 3
3 | Maine | 4
1 | Baltimore | 4
4 | Springfield | 0
South Division
2 | Rochester | 4
3 | St. Catharines | 3

Division Finals
4 | Nova Scotia | 1
3 | Maine | 4
1 | Baltimore | 2
2 | Rochester | 4

Calder Cup Final
N3 | Maine | 4
S2 | Rochester | 1

Details from hockeyDB

== Trophy and award winners ==
Team awards

| Calder Cup; Playoff champions: | Maine Mariners |
| F. G. "Teddy" Oke Trophy; Regular Season champions, North Division: | Fredericton Express |
| John D. Chick Trophy; Regular Season champions, South Division: | Baltimore Skipjacks |

Individual awards

| Les Cunningham Award; Most valuable player: | Garry Lariviere - St. Catharines Saints & Mal Davis - Rochester Americans |
| John B. Sollenberger Trophy; Top point scorer: | Claude Larose - Sherbrooke Jets |
| Dudley "Red" Garrett Memorial Award; Rookie of the year: | Claude Verret - Rochester Americans |
| Eddie Shore Award; Defenceman of the year: | Garry Lariviere - St. Catharines Saints |
| Aldege "Baz" Bastien Memorial Award; Best Goaltender: | Brian Ford - Fredericton Express |
| Harry "Hap" Holmes Memorial Award; Lowest goals against average: | Brian Ford - Fredericton Express |
| Louis A.R. Pieri Memorial Award; Coach of the year: | Gene Ubriaco - Baltimore Skipjacks |
| Fred T. Hunt Memorial Award; Sportsmanship / Perseverance: | Claude Larose - Sherbrooke Jets |
| Jack A. Butterfield Trophy; MVP of the playoffs: | Bud Stefanski - Maine Mariners |

Other awards

| James C. Hendy Memorial Award; Most outstanding executive: | Jack A. Butterfield |
| James H. Ellery Memorial Awards; Outstanding media coverage: | Jack Gatecliff, St. Catharines, (newspaper); Tom George, Rochester, (radio); Vince Bagli, Baltimore, (television) |
| Ken McKenzie Award; Outstanding marketing executive: | Dave Strader, Adirondack Red Wings |

== See also ==
- List of AHL seasons

| Preceded by 1982–83 AHL season | AHL seasons | Succeeded by 1984–85 AHL season |
