= Brian Ford (ice hockey) =

Canadian ice hockey player

- Born: September 22, 1961 (age 63); Edmonton, Alberta, Canada
- Height: 5 ft 10 in (178 cm)
- Weight: 170 lb (77 kg; 12 st 2 lb)
- Position: Goaltender
- Caught: Left
- Played for: Quebec Nordiques; Pittsburgh Penguins
- NHL draft: Undrafted
- Playing career: 1982–1991

Brian Ford (born September 22, 1961) is a Canadian retired professional ice hockey goaltender who played eleven games in the National Hockey League with the Quebec Nordiques and Pittsburgh Penguins during the 1983–84 and 1984–85 seasons. The rest of his career, which lasted from 1982 to 1991, was spent in various minor leagues.

== Career statistics ==
=== Regular season and playoffs ===
			Regular season									Playoffs
Season	Team	League	GP	W	L	T	MIN	GA	SO	GAA	SV%	GP	W	L	T	MIN	GA	SO	GAA	SV%
1977–78	St. Albert Saints	AJHL	1	1	0	0	60	3	0	3.80	—	—	—	—	—	—	—	—	—	—
1978–79	St. Albert Saints	AJHL	30	19	8	1	1978	114	0	3.80	.881	9	—	—	—	485	29	0	3.59	—
1979–80	St. Albert Saints	AJHL	39	22	15	2	2303	149	0	3.88	—	6	4	1	1	360	14	0	2.33	—
1980–81	Billings Bighorns	WHL	44	14	26	0	2435	204	0	5.03	.858	3	—	—	—	193	15	0	4.66	.872
1981–82	Billings Bighorns	WHL	53	19	26	1	2791	256	0	5.50	.866	5	1	4	—	226	26	0	6.90	.865
1982–83	Fredericton Express	AHL	27	14	7	2	1443	84	0	3.49	—	1	0	0	—	11	1	0	5.56	—
1982–83	Carolina Thunderbirds	ACHL	4	—	—	—	203	7	0	2.07	—	—	—	—	—	—	—	—	—	—
1983–84	Quebec Nordiques	NHL	3	1	1	0	123	13	0	6.34	.814	—	—	—	—	—	—	—	—	—
1983–84	Fredericton Express	AHL	36	17	17	1	2132	105	2	2.96	—	4	1	3	—	223	18	0	4.84	—
1984–85	Pittsburgh Penguins	NHL	8	2	6	0	456	48	0	6.32	.838	—	—	—	—	—	—	—	—	—
1984–85	Baltimore Skipjacks	AHL	6	3	3	0	363	21	0	3.47	—	—	—	—	—	—	—	—	—	—
1984–85	Muskegon Mohawks	IHL	22	17	5	0	1321	59	1	2.68	—	—	—	—	—	—	—	—	—	—
1985–86	Baltimore Skipjacks	AHL	39	12	20	4	2230	136	1	3.66	—	—	—	—	—	—	—	—	—	—
1985–86	Muskegon Mohawks	IHL	9	4	4	0	513	33	0	3.06	—	13	12	1	—	793	41	0	3.10	—
1986–87	Baltimore Skipjacks	AHL	32	10	11	0	1541	99	0	3.85	—	—	—	—	—	—	—	—	—	—
1987–88	Springfield Indians	AHL	35	12	15	4	1898	118	0	3.73	—	—	—	—	—	—	—	—	—	—
1988–89	Fredericton Capitals	NBSHL	30	—	—	—	1378	100	0	4.35	—	—	—	—	—	—	—	—	—	—
1988–89	Rochester Americans	AHL	19	12	4	1	1075	60	2	3.35	.883	—	—	—	—	—	—	—	—	—
1989–90	Rochester Americans	AHL	19	7	6	4	1076	69	0	3.85	.865	—	—	—	—	—	—	—	—	—
1990–91	Moncton Hawks	AHL	1	0	1	0	60	5	0	5.00	—	1	0	0	—	1	1	0	60.00	—
1990–91	Saint John Vitos	NBSHL	22	—	—	—	1320	101	1	4.59	—	—	—	—	—	—	—	—	—	—
NHL totals			11	3	7	0	579	61	0	6.32	.834	—	—	—	—	—	—	—	—	—

== Awards and honours ==
Award	Year	Ref
AHL
Harry "Hap" Holmes Memorial Award	1983, 1984	
AHL First All-Star Team	1984	
Aldege "Baz" Bastien Memorial Award	1984	

Awards and achievements
Preceded by Award created	Aldege "Baz" Bastien Memorial Award; 1983–84	Succeeded by Jon Casey
