= 1983–84 Quebec Nordiques season =

National Hockey League team season

1983–84 Quebec Nordiques
- Division: 3rd Adams
- Conference: 6th Wales
- 1983–84 record: 42–28–10
- Home record: 24–11–5
- Road record: 18–17–5
- Goals for: 360
- Goals against: 278

Team information
- General manager: Maurice Filion
- Coach: Michel Bergeron
- Captain: Mario Marois
- Alternate captains: None
- Arena: Colisée de Québec

Team leaders
- Goals: Michel Goulet (56)
- Assists: Peter Stastny (73)
- Points: Michel Goulet (121)
- Penalty minutes: Dale Hunter (232)
- Plus/minus: Michel Goulet (+62)
- Wins: Dan Bouchard (29)
- Goals against average: Dan Bouchard (3.20)

The 1983–84 Quebec Nordiques season was the Nordiques fifth season in the National Hockey League (NHL). In the 1982–83 season, Quebec won a club record 34 games, and finished fourth in the Adams Division earning 80 points, making the post-season for the third consecutive season. The Nordiques would fall to the Montreal Canadiens in six games in the Adams Division Finals.

== Off-season ==
During the off-season, Quebec named defenseman Mario Marois as their new team captain. The club played the 1982–83 season with no captain. Marois, an eight-year NHL veteran, had been with the Nordiques since the 1980–81 season. In early June, the Nordiques and Buffalo Sabres pulled off a blockbuster deal, with Quebec sending Real Cloutier and their first round draft pick in the 1983 NHL entry draft to Buffalo in exchange for Tony McKegney, Andre Savard, Jean-Francois Sauve, and the Sabres third round draft pick in the 1983 NHL entry draft.

== Regular season ==
The Nordiques would get off to a fast start, earning a 7-2-1 record in their first ten games. The team fell into a slump though, and found themselves under .500 with a 10-11-3 record. Quebec would snap out of the slump, and end the season with a club record 42 victories and 94 points, finishing in third place in the Adams Division, their highest final standing position in club history, and making the post-season for the fourth straight season. Quebec scored a club record 360 goals, and allowed a franchise low 278 goals.

Offensively, the Nordiques were led by Michel Goulet, who scored a team high 56 goals, which was the second highest total in the NHL, while adding 65 assists, recording 121 points, the third highest total in the league. Peter Stastny was right behind Goulet, as he scored 46 goals and 73 assists for 119 points, finishing fourth in the league scoring race. Dale Hunter had a solid season, scoring 24 goals and 79 points, as he recorded a team high 232 penalty minutes, while Wilf Paiement had 39 goals and 76 points. Newly appointed team captain Mario Marois led the Nordiques blueline, scoring 13 goals and 49 points.

In goal, Dan Bouchard had a very solid season, winning a franchise record 29 games, while posting a team low 3.20 GAA, and earning a shutout in 57 games.

=== Season standings ===
Adams Division
	GP	W	L	T	GF	GA	Pts
**Boston Bruins**	80	49	25	6	336	261	104
**Buffalo Sabres**	80	48	25	7	315	257	103
**Quebec Nordiques**	80	42	28	10	360	278	94
**Montreal Canadiens**	80	35	40	5	286	295	75
Hartford Whalers	80	28	42	10	288	320	66

Note: GP = Games played, W = Wins, L = Losses, T = Ties, Pts = Points, GF = Goals for, GA = Goals against
Note: Teams that qualified for the playoffs are highlighted in bold.

=== Record vs. opponents ===
Adams Division record vs. opponents

==== Vs. Wales Conference ====
**Vs. Adams Division**

1983–84 NHL records
Team	**BOS**	**BUF**	**HFD**	**MTL**	**QUE**	**Total**
Boston	—	4–4	5–2–1	6–2	4–4	**19–12–1**
Buffalo	4–4	—	5–3	8–0	1–6–1	**18–13–1**
Hartford	2–5–1	3–5	—	0–7−1	1–3−4	**6–20–6**
Montreal	2–6	0–8	7–0−1	—	3–5	**12–19–1**
Quebec	4–4	6–1–1	3–1−4	5–3	—	**18–9–5**

**Vs. Patrick Division**

1983–84 NHL records
Team	**NJD**	**NYI**	**NYR**	**PHI**	**PIT**	**WSH**	**Total**
Boston	2−1	2−0−1	2−0–1	1−1−1	3−0	2−1	**12−3−3**
Buffalo	2−0−1	0−3	1−1−1	3−0	3−0	2−0−1	**11−4−3**
Hartford	1−1–1	2–1	2–1	2–1	1–2	1−2	**9−8−1**
Montreal	2−1	0−3	2–1	0−2−1	2−0−1	0−3	**6−10−2**
Quebec	2−1	2−1	0−2–1	0−2−1	3−0	2−1	**9−7−2**

==== Vs. Campbell Conference ====
**Vs. Norris Division**

1983–84 NHL records
Team	**CHI**	**DET**	**MIN**	**STL**	**TOR**	**Total**
Boston	1–2	2–1	1–2	3–0	1–2	**8–7–0**
Buffalo	1−2	1−1−1	1−2	2−1	2−0−1	**7−6−2**
Hartford	2–1	1–1−1	3−0	2–1	2–1	**10–4–1**
Montreal	2−0–1	3−0	1–2	3–0	2−1	**11–3–1**
Quebec	1–1−1	1–2	2–0−1	2–0–1	2–1	**8–4–3**

**Vs. Smythe Division**

1983–84 NHL records
Team	**CGY**	**EDM**	**LAK**	**VAN**	**WIN**	**Total**
Boston	2−0−1	1−2	3−0	2−0−1	2−1	**10−3−2**
Buffalo	3−0	1–2	2−0−1	3−0	3−0	**12−2−1**
Hartford	0−2–1	1–2	2–1	0–3	0–2–1	**3–10–2**
Montreal	2−1	1−2	1−2	1–2	1−1−1	**6−8−1**
Quebec	2−1	0−3	3−0	1−2	1−2	**7−8−0**

== Schedule and results ==
1983–84 regular season
October

Game	Date	Visitor	Score	Home	Record	Points	Attendance
1	October 4	New York Islanders	3–7	Quebec Nordiques	1–0–0	2	14,917
2	October 6	Quebec Nordiques	3–9	Boston Bruins	1–1–0	2	14,451
3	October 8	Buffalo Sabres	2–9	Quebec Nordiques	2–1–0	4	14,849
4	October 10	Montreal Canadiens	6–4	Quebec Nordiques	2–2–0	4	15,321
5	October 13	Quebec Nordiques	4–4	Hartford Whalers	2–2–1	5	8,353
6	October 14	Quebec Nordiques	6–4	New Jersey Devils	3–2–1	7	9,961
7	October 16	Quebec Nordiques	4–2	Washington Capitals	4-2–1	9	7,270
8	October 18	Boston Bruins	3–5	Quebec Nordiques	5–2–1	11	15,125
9	October 19	Quebec Nordiques	8–1	Toronto Maple Leafs	6–2–1	13	16,382
10	October 22	Minnesota North Stars	2–11	Quebec Nordiques	7–2–1	15	15,017
11	October 25	Philadelphia Flyers	4–2	Quebec Nordiques	7–3–1	15	15,025
12	October 27	Quebec Nordiques	3–4	Philadelphia Flyers	7–4–1	15	16,024
13	October 29	Quebec Nordiques	3–4	Detroit Red Wings	7–5–1	15	18,455

November

Game	Date	Visitor	Score	Home	Record	Points	Attendance
14	November 1	Los Angeles Kings	4–8	Quebec Nordiques	8–5–1	17	15,291
15	November 3	Quebec Nordiques	2–3	Montreal Canadiens	8–6–1	17	17,148
16	November 5	New York Rangers	4–4	Quebec Nordiques	8–6–2	18	15,075
17	November 6	Quebec Nordiques	7–1	Buffalo Sabres	9–6–2	20	12,204
18	November 8	Edmonton Oilers	7–4	Quebec Nordiques	9–7–2	20	15,272
19	November 12	Boston Bruins	6–4	Quebec Nordiques	9–8–2	20	15,300
20	November 15	Detroit Red Wings	3–1	Quebec Nordiques	9–9–2	20	14,669
21	November 17	Quebec Nordiques	4–2	Hartford Whalers	10–9–2	22	10,644
22	November 19	Hartford Whalers	4–4	Quebec Nordiques	10–9–3	23	14,879
23	November 20	Quebec Nordiques	5–6	New York Rangers	10–10–3	23	17,421
24	November 22	Quebec Nordiques	2–3	New York Islanders	10–11–3	23	15,351
25	November 24	Quebec Nordiques	6–3	Boston Bruins	11–11-3	25	14,451
26	November 26	Buffalo Sabres	2–3	Quebec Nordiques	12–11–3	27	15,263
27	November 29	Washington Capitals	3–6	Quebec Nordiques	13–11–3	29	14,937

December

Game	Date	Visitor	Score	Home	Record	Points	Attendance
28	December 1	Quebec Nordiques	6–3	Montreal Canadiens	14–11–3	31	17,248
29	December 3	Chicago Black Hawks	2–3	Quebec Nordiques	15–11–3	33	15,173
30	December 6	Calgary Flames	1–8	Quebec Nordiques	16–11–3	35	14,435
31	December 10	Quebec Nordiques	6–4	Los Angeles Kings	17–11–3	37	10,563
32	December 13	Quebec Nordiques	2–6	Vancouver Canucks	17–12–3	37	13,973
33	December 14	Quebec Nordiques	2–4	Calgary Flames	17–13–3	37	17,754
34	December 17	Quebec Nordiques	1–8	Edmonton Oilers	17–14–3	37	17,498
35	December 20	Vancouver Canucks	4–6	Quebec Nordiques	18–14–3	39	15,061
36	December 22	Montreal Canadiens	1–4	Quebec Nordiques	19–14–3	41	15,304
37	December 27	Hartford Whalers	3–7	Quebec Nordiques	20–14–3	43	15,281
38	December 29	Quebec Nordiques	5–8	Buffalo Sabres	20–15–3	43	16,433
39	December 31	Quebec Nordiques	2–4	Montreal Canadiens	20–16–3	43	17,866

January

Game	Date	Visitor	Score	Home	Record	Points	Attendance
40	January 3	Montreal Canadiens	5–9	Quebec Nordiques	21–16–3	45	15,315
41	January 5	Quebec Nordiques	8–3	Boston Bruins	22–16-3	47	14,451
42	January 7	Toronto Maple Leafs	2–4	Quebec Nordiques	23–16–3	49	15,279
43	January 10	Pittsburgh Penguins	1–7	Quebec Nordiques	24–16–3	51	15,014
44	January 12	Quebec Nordiques	4–1	New Jersey Devils	25–16–3	53	9,050
45	January 14	Philadelphia Flyers	3–3	Quebec Nordiques	25–16–4	54	15,294
46	January 17	Boston Bruins	3–7	Quebec Nordiques	26-16–4	56	15,317
47	January 19	Quebec Nordiques	3–4	Boston Bruins	26–17–4	56	14,451
48	January 21	Chicago Black Hawks	4–4	Quebec Nordiques	26–17–5	57	15,273
49	January 24	Winnipeg Jets	5–3	Quebec Nordiques	26–18–5	57	15,077
50	January 26	Quebec Nordiques	5–1	New York Islanders	27–18–5	59	15,660
51	January 28	Hartford Whalers	0–3	Quebec Nordiques	28–18–5	61	15,074
52	January 29	Quebec Nordiques	5–5	Hartford Whalers	28–18–6	62	10,067

February

Game	Date	Visitor	Score	Home	Record	Points	Attendance
53	February 4	New Jersey Devils	5–3	Quebec Nordiques	28–19–6	62	N/A
54	February 5	Quebec Nordiques	2–1	Buffalo Sabres	29–19–6	64	16,233
55	February 7	Vancouver Canucks	4-2	Quebec Nordiques	29–20–6	64	14,830
56	February 11	Quebec Nordiques	2–5	Toronto Maple Leafs	29–21–6	64	16,382
57	February 13	Pittsburgh Penguins	1–6	Quebec Nordiques	30–21–6	66	14,757
58	February 15	Quebec Nordiques	2–5	Chicago Black Hawks	30–22–6	66	16,528
59	February 17	Quebec Nordiques	6–3	Winnipeg Jets	31–22–6	68	11,680
60	February 18	Quebec Nordiques	7–2	Minnesota North Stars	32–22–6	70	15,294
61	February 21	Montreal Canadiens	2–3	Quebec Nordiques	33–22–6	72	15,365
62	February 23	Quebec Nordiques	2–4	New York Rangers	33–23–6	72	17,404
63	February 25	St. Louis Blues	3–3	Quebec Nordiques	33–23–7	73	15,292
64	February 26	St. Louis Blues	0-5	Quebec Nordiques	34–23–7	75	15,289
65	February 28	Detroit Red Wings	2–6	Quebec Nordiques	35–23–7	77	14,952

March

Game	Date	Visitor	Score	Home	Record	Points	Attendance
66	March 3	Buffalo Sabres	2–4	Quebec Nordiques	36–23-7	79	15,311
67	March 4	Quebec Nordiques	1–1	Buffalo Sabres	36–23–8	80	16,433
68	March 6	Calgary Flames	3–4	Quebec Nordiques	37–23–8	82	15,287
69	March 8	Quebec Nordiques	8–6	Pittsburgh Penguins	38–23–8	84	3,812
70	March 9	Quebec Nordiques	3–5	Washington Capitals	38–24–8	84	16,793
71	March 11	Quebec Nordiques	5-6	Winnipeg Jets	38–25-8	84	13,172
72	March 13	Edmonton Oilers	6–5	Quebec Nordiques	38–26–8	84	15,326
73	March 17	Quebec Nordiques	6–4	St. Louis Blues	39–26–8	86	14,460
74	March 18	Quebec Nordiques	5–5	Minnesota North Stars	39–26–9	87	15,784
75	March 20	Quebec Nordiques	3–1	Los Angeles Kings	40–26–9	89	8,535
76	March 24	Hartford Whalers	3–2	Quebec Nordiques	40–27–9	89	15,346
77	March 25	Quebec Nordiques	6–6	Hartford Whalers	40–27–10	90	10,058
78	March 27	Boston Bruins	6–4	Quebec Nordiques	40–28–10	90	15,337
79	March 29	Quebec Nordiques	5–2	Montreal Canadiens	41–28–10	92	18,089
80	March 31	Buffalo Sabres	1–4	Quebec Nordiques	42–28–10	94	15,353

Legend: Win (2 points) Loss (0 points) Tie (1 point)

== Playoffs ==
The Nordiques opened the 1984 Stanley Cup playoffs with a best of five Adams Division semi-final series against the Buffalo Sabres. The Sabres finished the season in second place in the Adams Division, earning a record of 48-25-7 for 103 points. The series opened with two games at the Buffalo Memorial Auditorium; however, Quebec struck first, holding off the Sabres for a 3–2 victory in the first game, followed by a 6–2 thrashing in the second game to take a 2–0 series lead. The series moved back to Le Colisée, and the Nordiques made short work of the Sabres, defeating them 4–1 in the third game, to record their first ever series sweep in team history, advancing to the Adams Division finals.

Quebec would face the Montreal Canadiens in the best of seven Division finals. The Canadiens had a 35-40-5 record in the regular season, earning 75 points and a fourth-place finish. Montreal upset the powerful Boston Bruins in their first round series, as the Canadiens swept the Bruins in three games. The series opened with two games at Le Colisée, and the Nordiques took the first game with a 4–2 victory, however, the Canadiens evened the series up in the second game, beating Quebec 4–1. The series shifted to the Montreal Forum for the next two games, and the Canadiens took their first series lead, defeating Quebec 2–1 in the third game. The Nordiques rebounded in the fourth game with a 4–3 overtime victory in the fourth game to even the series up once again. The fifth game was played back in Quebec City, but it was the Canadiens who took control of the series, shutting out the Nordiques 4–0. With the Nordiques on the brink of elimination in the sixth game, back in Montreal, the team stormed out to a 2-0 lead before a bench clearing brawl broke out, in which Dale Hunter and Peter Stastny of the Nordiques were ejected from the game. The Canadiens took advantage of the situation, and scored five unanswered goals in the third period, to win the game 5-3 and eliminate the Nordiques from the playoffs.

1984 Stanley Cup playoffs
Adams Division Semifinals vs. (A2) Buffalo Sabres – Nordiques win 3–0

Game	Date	Visitor	Score	Home	Series	Attendance
1	April 4	Quebec Nordiques	3–2	Buffalo Sabres	1-0	16,800
2	April 5	Quebec Nordiques	6–2	Buffalo Sabres	2-0	15,730
3	April 7	Buffalo Sabres	1–4	Quebec Nordiques	3-0	15,334

Adams Division Finals vs. (A4) Montreal Canadiens – Canadiens win 4–2

Game	Date	Visitor	Score	Home	Series	Attendance
1	April 12	Montreal Canadiens	2–4	Quebec Nordiques	1-0	15,390
2	April 13	Montreal Canadiens	4–1	Quebec Nordiques	1-1	15,397
3	April 15	Quebec Nordiques	1–2	Montreal Canadiens	1-2	18,076
4	April 16	Quebec Nordiques	4–3	Montreal Canadiens	2-2	17,276
5	April 18	Montreal Canadiens	4–0	Quebec Nordiques	2-3	15,382
6	April 20	Quebec Nordiques	3–5	Montreal Canadiens	2-4	18,090

Legend: Win Loss

== Player statistics ==
Regular season
Scoring

Player	Pos	GP	G	A	Pts	PIM	+/-	PPG	SHG	GWG
Michel Goulet	LW	75	56	65	121	76	62	11	2	16
Peter Stastny	C	80	46	73	119	73	22	11	0	4
Dale Hunter	C	77	24	55	79	232	35	7	2	1
Wilf Paiement	RW	80	39	37	76	121	28	8	3	3
Anton Stastny	LW	69	25	37	62	14	12	7	0	0
Marian Stastny	RW	68	20	32	52	26	1	4	0	5
Tony McKegney	LW	75	24	27	51	23	4	4	0	2
Mario Marois	D	80	13	36	49	151	51	4	0	0
Andre Savard	C	60	20	24	44	38	17	0	2	2
Alain Cote	LW	77	19	24	43	41	21	0	1	1
Bo Berglund	RW	75	16	27	43	20	6	1	0	1
Louis Sleigher	RW	44	15	19	34	32	23	3	1	1
Pat Price	D	72	3	25	28	188	20	0	0	2
Jean-Francois Sauve	C	39	10	17	27	2	4	5	0	0
Normand Rochefort	D	75	2	22	24	47	41	0	0	1
Randy Moller	D	74	4	14	18	147	26	0	0	1
Paul Gillis	C	57	8	9	17	59	10	0	0	1
Andre Dore	D	25	1	16	17	25	1	0	0	0
Rick Lapointe	D	22	2	10	12	12	9	0	0	0
Blake Wesley	D	46	2	8	10	75	14	0	0	0
Dave Pichette	D	23	2	7	9	12	2	0	0	0
John Van Boxmeer	D	18	5	3	8	12	-1	4	0	0
Wally Weir	D	25	2	3	5	17	5	0	0	1
Gord Donnelly	D	38	0	5	5	60	-1	0	0	0
Dan Bouchard	G	57	0	3	3	19	0	0	0	0
Pierre Aubry	LW	23	1	1	2	17	-3	0	0	0
Jimmy Mann	RW	22	1	1	2	42	-3	0	0	0
Clint Malarchuk	G	23	0	1	1	9	0	0	0	0
Jim Dobson	RW	1	0	0	0	0	-1	0	0	0
Brian Ford	G	3	0	0	0	0	0	0	0	0
Jean-Marc Gaulin	RW	2	0	0	0	0	-1	0	0	0
Mario Gosselin	G	3	0	0	0	2	0	0	0	0
David Shaw	D	3	0	0	0	0	2	0	0	0

Goaltending

Player	MIN	GP	W	L	T	GA	GAA	SO
Dan Bouchard	3373	57	29	18	8	180	3.20	1
Clint Malarchuk	1215	23	10	9	2	80	3.95	0
Mario Gosselin	148	3	2	0	0	3	1.22	1
Brian Ford	123	3	1	1	0	13	6.34	0
Team:	4859	80	42	28	10	276	3.41	2

Playoffs
Scoring

Player	Pos	GP	G	A	Pts	PIM	PPG	SHG	GWG
Peter Stastny	C	9	2	7	9	31	2	0	0
Jean-Francois Sauve	C	9	2	5	7	2	2	0	1
Anton Stastny	LW	9	2	5	7	7	0	0	0
Michel Goulet	LW	9	2	4	6	17	0	0	0
Dale Hunter	C	9	2	3	5	41	0	0	0
Marian Stastny	RW	9	2	3	5	2	0	0	1
Mario Marois	D	9	1	4	5	6	0	0	0
Wilf Paiement	RW	9	3	1	4	24	0	0	0
Andre Savard	C	9	3	0	3	2	0	2	1
Blake Wesley	D	9	1	2	3	20	0	0	1
Bo Berglund	RW	7	2	0	2	4	0	0	1
Louis Sleigher	RW	7	1	1	2	42	0	0	0
Alain Cote	LW	9	0	2	2	17	0	0	0
Randy Moller	D	9	1	0	1	45	0	0	0
Pat Price	D	9	1	0	1	10	0	0	0
Normand Rochefort	D	6	1	0	1	6	0	0	0
Dan Bouchard	G	9	0	0	0	2	0	0	0
Andre Dore	D	9	0	0	0	8	0	0	0
Paul Gillis	C	1	0	0	0	2	0	0	0
Rick Lapointe	D	3	0	0	0	0	0	0	0
Jimmy Mann	RW	3	0	0	0	22	0	0	0
Tony McKegney	LW	7	0	0	0	0	0	0	0
Wally Weir	D	1	0	0	0	17	0	0	0

Goaltending

Player	MIN	GP	W	L	GA	GAA	SO
Dan Bouchard	543	9	5	4	25	2.76	0
Team:	543	9	5	4	25	2.76	0

Note:

Pos = Position;GP = Games played; G = Goals; A = Assists; Pts = Points; PIM = Penalty minutes; +/- = Plus/minus; PPG = Power-play goals; SHG = Short-handed goals; GWG = Game-winning goals
Pos = Position;GP = Games played; Min, TOI = Minutes played; W = Wins; L = Losses; T,T/OT = Ties; OTL = Overtime losses; GA = Goals-against; GAA = Goals-against average; SO = Shutouts; SA = Shots against; SV = Shots saved;SV% = Save percentage;

== Awards ==
- First NHL All-Star team: Michel Goulet

== Transactions ==
The Nordiques were involved in the following transactions during the 1983–84 season.

=== Trades ===
June 29, 1983	To Minnesota North Stars Jay Miller	To Quebec Nordiques Jim Dobson
August 12, 1983	To Toronto Maple Leafs Basil McRae	To Quebec Nordiques Richard Turmel
August 19, 1983	To St. Louis Blues Head Coach Jacques Demers	To Quebec Nordiques Gord Donnelly; Claude Julien
January 1, 1984	To St. Louis Blues Cash	To Quebec Nordiques Roger Haegglund
February 6, 1984	To Winnipeg Jets 5th-round pick in 1984 – Brent Severyn	To Quebec Nordiques Jimmy Mann
February 10, 1984	To St. Louis Blues Dave Pichette	To Quebec Nordiques Andre Dore
February 29, 1984	To Detroit Red Wings Pierre Aubry	To Quebec Nordiques Cash

=== Waivers ===
October 3, 1983	To Montreal Canadiens Jean Hamel
October 3, 1983	To St. Louis Blues Terry Johnson
October 3, 1983	From Montreal Canadiens Jeff Brubaker
October 3, 1983	To Calgary Flames Jeff Brubaker
October 3, 1983	From Buffalo Sabres John Van Boxmeer

== Draft picks ==
Quebec's draft picks from the 1983 NHL entry draft which was held at the Montreal Forum in Montreal.

Round	#	Player	Nationality	College/junior/club team (league)
2	32	Yves Heroux	Canada	Chicoutimi Saguenéens (QMJHL)
3	52	Bruce Bell	Canada	Windsor Spitfires (OHL)
3	54	Iiro Jarvi	Finland	HIFK (Finland)
5	92	Luc Guenette	Canada	Quebec Remparts (QMJHL)
6	112	Brad Walcot	Canada	Kingston Canadians (OHL)
7	132	Craig Mack	United States	East Grand Forks High School (USHS)
8	152	Tommy Albelin	Sweden	Djurgardens IF (Sweden)
9	172	Wayne Groulx	Canada	Sault Ste. Marie Greyhounds (OHL)
10	192	Scott Shaunessy	United States	St. John's Preparatory School (USHS)
12	232	Bo Berglund	Sweden	Djurgardens IF (Sweden)
12	239	Jindrich Kokrment	Czechoslovakia	Czechoslovakia men's national ice hockey team (National)
