= 1983–84 Montreal Canadiens season =

NHL hockey team season

1983–84 Montreal Canadiens
- Division: 4th Adams
- Conference: 8th Wales
- 1983–84 record: 35–40–5
- Home record: 19–19–2
- Road record: 16–21–3
- Goals for: 286
- Goals against: 295

Team information
- General manager: Serge Savard
- Coach: Bob Berry; Jacques Lemaire
- Captain: Bob Gainey
- Alternate captains: None
- Arena: Montreal Forum

Team leaders
- Goals: Guy Lafleur (30)
- Assists: Guy Lafleur (40)
- Points: Guy Lafleur (70)
- Penalty minutes: Chris Nilan (338)
- Plus/minus: Bill Root (+26)
- Wins: Rick Wamsley (19)
- Goals against average: Richard Sevigny (3.38)

The 1983–84 Montreal Canadiens season was the team's 75th season of play in the National Hockey League (NHL). The team struggled on the ice and, for the first time ever in the expansion era, finished the regular season with a losing record. Coach Bob Berry was fired 63 games into the season and replaced with former Canadiens great Jacques Lemaire.

The club placed fourth in its division, which was still good enough to qualify for the playoffs ahead of the last place Hartford Whalers. The Habs then stunned their heavily favoured rivals, the Boston Bruins with a 3–0 sweep in the opening round. With the upset, Montreal recorded their first playoff series victory since 1980. Then they defeated their provincial rivals, the Quebec Nordiques in the Adams final, in a series notorious for the two bench clearing brawls before the third period of game 6. The Canadiens were finally eliminated in the Prince of Wales Conference finals by the defending Stanley Cup champion New York Islanders in six games.

== Regular season ==
=== Final standings ===
Adams Division
	GP	W	L	T	GF	GA	Pts
**Boston Bruins**	80	49	25	6	336	261	104
**Buffalo Sabres**	80	48	25	7	315	257	103
**Quebec Nordiques**	80	42	28	10	360	278	94
**Montreal Canadiens**	80	35	40	5	286	295	75
Hartford Whalers	80	28	42	10	288	320	66

Note: GP = Games played, W = Wins, L = Losses, T = Ties, Pts = Points, GF = Goals for, GA = Goals against
Note: Teams that qualified for the playoffs are highlighted in bold.

=== Record vs. opponents ===
Adams Division record vs. opponents

==== Vs. Wales Conference ====
**Vs. Adams Division**

1983–84 NHL records
Team	**BOS**	**BUF**	**HFD**	**MTL**	**QUE**	**Total**
Boston	—	4–4	5–2–1	6–2	4–4	**19–12–1**
Buffalo	4–4	—	5–3	8–0	1–6–1	**18–13–1**
Hartford	2–5–1	3–5	—	0–7−1	1–3−4	**6–20–6**
Montreal	2–6	0–8	7–0−1	—	3–5	**12–19–1**
Quebec	4–4	6–1–1	3–1−4	5–3	—	**18–9–5**

**Vs. Patrick Division**

1983–84 NHL records
Team	**NJD**	**NYI**	**NYR**	**PHI**	**PIT**	**WSH**	**Total**
Boston	2−1	2−0−1	2−0–1	1−1−1	3−0	2−1	**12−3−3**
Buffalo	2−0−1	0−3	1−1−1	3−0	3−0	2−0−1	**11−4−3**
Hartford	1−1–1	2–1	2–1	2–1	1–2	1−2	**9−8−1**
Montreal	2−1	0−3	2–1	0−2−1	2−0−1	0−3	**6−10−2**
Quebec	2−1	2−1	0−2–1	0−2−1	3−0	2−1	**9−7−2**

==== Vs. Campbell Conference ====
**Vs. Norris Division**

1983–84 NHL records
Team	**CHI**	**DET**	**MIN**	**STL**	**TOR**	**Total**
Boston	1–2	2–1	1–2	3–0	1–2	**8–7–0**
Buffalo	1−2	1−1−1	1−2	2−1	2−0−1	**7−6−2**
Hartford	2–1	1–1−1	3−0	2–1	2–1	**10–4–1**
Montreal	2−0–1	3−0	1–2	3–0	2−1	**11–3–1**
Quebec	1–1−1	1–2	2–0−1	2–0–1	2–1	**8–4–3**

**Vs. Smythe Division**

1983–84 NHL records
Team	**CGY**	**EDM**	**LAK**	**VAN**	**WIN**	**Total**
Boston	2−0−1	1−2	3−0	2−0−1	2−1	**10−3−2**
Buffalo	3−0	1–2	2−0−1	3−0	3−0	**12−2−1**
Hartford	0−2–1	1–2	2–1	0–3	0–2–1	**3–10–2**
Montreal	2−1	1−2	1−2	1–2	1−1−1	**6−8−1**
Quebec	2−1	0−3	3−0	1−2	1−2	**7−8−0**

== Schedule and results ==
=== Regular season ===
1983–84 regular season
October: 4–7–0 (home: 1–4–0; road: 3–3–0)

Game	Date	Visitor	Score	Home	OT	Decision	Location Attendance	Record	Pts	Recap
1	October 6, 1983	NY Islanders	7–4	Montreal		Wamsley	Montreal Forum; 16,685	0–1–0	0	
2	October 8, 1983	Philadelphia	6–3	Montreal			Montreal Forum	0–2–0	0	
3	October 10, 1983	Montreal	6–4	Quebec			Quebec Coliseum	1–2–0	2	
4	October 13, 1983	Montreal	2–4	Boston			Boston Garden	1–3–0	2	
5	October 15, 1983	Vancouver	4–5	Montreal			Montreal Forum	2–3–0	4	
6	October 19, 1983	Montreal	12–2	Winnipeg			Winnipeg Arena	3–3–0	6	
7	October 20, 1983	Montreal	5–4	Minnesota	OT		Met Center	4–3–0	8	
8	October 22, 1983	Montreal	3–5	Toronto			Maple Leaf Gardens	4–4–0	8	
9	October 25, 1983	Minnesota	4–3	Montreal			Montreal Forum	4–5–0	8	
10	October 29, 1983	Edmonton	3–1	Montreal		Sevigny	Montreal Forum; 17,781	4–6–0	8	
11	October 30, 1983	Montreal	4–5	Buffalo			Buffalo Memorial Auditorium	4–7–0	8	

November: 7–5–1 (home: 4–3–1; road: 3–2–0)

Game	Date	Visitor	Score	Home	OT	Decision	Location Attendance	Record	Pts	Recap
12	November 1, 1983	Hartford	2–6	Montreal			Montreal Forum	5–7–0	10	
13	November 3, 1983	Quebec	2–3	Montreal			Montreal Forum	6–7–0	12	
14	November 5, 1983	Boston	10–4	Montreal			Montreal Forum	6–8–0	12	
15	November 9, 1983	Montreal	3–0	Chicago			Chicago Stadium	7–8–0	14	
16	November 12, 1983	Montreal	4–6	Los Angeles			The Forum	7–9–0	14	
17	November 13, 1983	Montreal	3–4	Vancouver			Pacific Coliseum	7–10–0	14	
18	November 15, 1983	Montreal	5–2	St. Louis			St. Louis Arena	8–10–0	16	
19	November 17, 1983	Detroit	2–4	Montreal			Montreal Forum	9–10–0	18	
20	November 19, 1983	Chicago	5–5	Montreal	OT		Montreal Forum	9–10–1	19	
21	November 22, 1983	Boston	2–4	Montreal			Montreal Forum	10–10–1	21	
22	November 23, 1983	Montreal	4–3	Hartford			Hartford Civic Center	11–10–1	23	
23	November 26, 1983	Washington	5–2	Montreal			Montreal Forum	11–11–1	23	
24	November 29, 1983	Buffalo	5–2	Montreal			Montreal Forum	11–12–1	23	

December: 7–6–1 (home: 5–2–0; road: 2–4–1)

Game	Date	Visitor	Score	Home	OT	Decision	Location Attendance	Record	Pts	Recap
25	December 1, 1983	Quebec	6–3	Montreal			Montreal Forum	11–13–1	23	
26	December 3, 1983	Calgary	2–4	Montreal			Montreal Forum	12–13–1	25	
27	December 4, 1983	Montreal	2–6	Buffalo			Buffalo Memorial Auditorium	12–14–1	25	
28	December 6, 1983	Hartford	1–4	Montreal			Montreal Forum	13–14–1	27	
29	December 8, 1983	Montreal	2–6	Boston			Boston Garden	13–15–1	27	
30	December 10, 1983	Montreal	0–2	Washington			Capital Centre	13–16–1	27	
31	December 11, 1983	Montreal	3–3	Pittsburgh	OT		Pittsburgh Civic Arena	13–16–2	28	
32	December 15, 1983	Pittsburgh	1–3	Montreal			Montreal Forum	14–16–2	30	
33	December 17, 1983	St. Louis	3–6	Montreal			Montreal Forum	15–16–2	32	
34	December 20, 1983	Montreal	6–0	New Jersey			Brendan Byrne Arena	16–16–2	34	
35	December 22, 1983	Montreal	1–4	Quebec			Quebec Coliseum	16–17–2	34	
36	December 26, 1983	Montreal	2–1	Hartford			Hartford Civic Center	17–17–2	36	
37	December 27, 1983	Buffalo	7–4	Montreal			Montreal Forum	17–18–2	36	
38	December 31, 1983	Quebec	2–4	Montreal			Montreal Forum	18–18–2	38	

January: 7–6–1 (home: 3–3–1; road: 4–3–0)

Game	Date	Visitor	Score	Home	OT	Decision	Location Attendance	Record	Pts	Recap
39	January 3, 1984	Montreal	5–9	Quebec			Quebec Coliseum	18–19–2	38	
40	January 5, 1984	Detroit	1–5	Montreal			Montreal Forum	19–19–2	40	
41	January 7, 1984	St. Louis	0–5	Montreal			Montreal Forum	20–19–2	42	
42	January 8, 1984	Montreal	3–4	Buffalo			Buffalo Memorial Auditorium	20–20–2	42	
43	January 11, 1984	Montreal	6–4	Toronto			Maple Leaf Gardens	21–20–2	44	
44	January 12, 1984	Montreal	3–7	NY Islanders		Wamsley	Nassau Veterans Memorial Coliseum; 15,850	21–21–2	44	
45	January 14, 1984	New Jersey	3–1	Montreal			Montreal Forum	21–22–2	44	
46	January 17, 1984	Philadelphia	6–4	Montreal			Montreal Forum	21–23–2	44	
47	January 19, 1984	Montreal	3–2	Hartford			Hartford Civic Center	22–23–2	46	
48	January 21, 1984	Calgary	3–2	Montreal			Montreal Forum	22–24–2	46	
49	January 24, 1984	Hartford	7–7	Montreal	OT		Montreal Forum	22–24–3	47	
50	January 26, 1984	Montreal	4–2	NY Rangers			Madison Square Garden	23–24–3	49	
51	January 28, 1984	Pittsburgh	2–5	Montreal			Montreal Forum	24–24–3	51	
52	January 29, 1984	Montreal	7–2	Boston			Boston Garden	25–24–3	53	
NHL All-Star Game in East Rutherford, New Jersey

February: 4–6–2 (home: 2–3–0; road: 2–3–2)

Game	Date	Visitor	Score	Home	OT	Decision	Location Attendance	Record	Pts	Recap
53	February 2, 1984	Montreal	2–2	Philadelphia	OT		The Spectrum	25–24–4	54	
54	February 3, 1984	Montreal	1–4	Washington			Capital Centre	25–25–4	54	
55	February 5, 1984	Montreal	2–2	Winnipeg	OT		Winnipeg Arena	25–25–5	55	
56	February 7, 1984	Montreal	5–2	New Jersey			Brendan Byrne Arena	26–25–5	57	
57	February 9, 1984	Vancouver	7–6	Montreal			Montreal Forum	26–26–5	57	
58	February 11, 1984	Buffalo	4–3	Montreal			Montreal Forum	26–27–5	57	
59	February 13, 1984	Los Angeles	3–5	Montreal			Montreal Forum	27–27–5	59	
60	February 14, 1984	Montreal	5–3	Hartford			Hartford Civic Center	28–27–5	61	
61	February 18, 1984	Montreal	3–5	Los Angeles			The Forum	28–28–5	61	
62	February 21, 1984	Montreal	2–3	Quebec			Quebec Coliseum	28–29–5	61	
63	February 23, 1984	Winnipeg	5–3	Montreal			Montreal Forum	28–30–5	61	
64	February 25, 1984	NY Rangers	4–7	Montreal			Montreal Forum	29–30–5	63	

March: 6–10–0 (home: 4–4–0; road: 2–6–0)

Game	Date	Visitor	Score	Home	OT	Decision	Location Attendance	Record	Pts	Recap
65	March 1, 1984	Montreal	3–1	Detroit			Joe Louis Arena	30–30–5	65	
66	March 3, 1984	Montreal	3–1	Calgary			Olympic Saddledome	31–30–5	67	
67	March 4, 1984	Montreal	1–6	Edmonton		Sevigny	Northlands Coliseum; 17,498	31–31–5	67	
68	March 6, 1984	Buffalo	8–3	Montreal			Montreal Forum	31–32–5	67	
69	March 8, 1984	Hartford	2–3	Montreal			Montreal Forum	32–32–5	69	
70	March 10, 1984	Boston	4–2	Montreal			Montreal Forum	32–33–5	69	
71	March 12, 1984	Montreal	6–7	Minnesota	OT		Met Center	32–34–5	69	
72	March 15, 1984	Edmonton	2–3	Montreal		Wamsley	Montreal Forum; 18,076	33–34–5	71	
73	March 17, 1984	Toronto	1–6	Montreal			Montreal Forum	34–34–5	73	
74	March 19, 1984	Chicago	1–2	Montreal			Montreal Forum	35–34–5	75	
75	March 21, 1984	Montreal	2–4	Buffalo			Buffalo Memorial Auditorium	35–35–5	75	
76	March 24, 1984	Boston	5–2	Montreal			Montreal Forum	35–36–5	75	
77	March 25, 1984	Montreal	2–3	NY Rangers			Madison Square Garden	35–37–5	75	
78	March 27, 1984	Montreal	0–7	NY Islanders		Penney	Nassau Veterans Memorial Coliseum; 15,850	35–38–5	75	
79	March 29, 1984	Quebec	5–2	Montreal			Montreal Forum	35–39–5	75	
80	March 31, 1984	Montreal	2–1	Boston			Boston Garden	35–40–5	75	

Legend: Win (2 points) Loss (0 points) Tie (1 point)

=== Playoffs ===
1984 Stanley Cup playoffs
Adams Division Semifinals vs. (A1) Boston Bruins: Montreal win 3–0

Game	Date	Visitor	Score	Home	OT	Decision	Location Attendance	Series	Recap
1	April 4, 1984	Montreal	2–1	Boston			Boston Garden	1–0	
2	April 5, 1984	Montreal	3–1	Boston			Boston Garden	2–0	
3	April 7, 1984	Boston	0–5	Montreal			Montreal Forum	3–0	

Adams Division Finals vs. (A3) Quebec Nordiques: Montreal win 4–2

Game	Date	Visitor	Score	Home	OT	Decision	Location Attendance	Series	Recap
1	April 12, 1984	Montreal	2–4	Quebec			Quebec Coliseum	0–1	
2	April 13, 1984	Montreal	4–1	Quebec			Quebec Coliseum	1–1	
3	April 15, 1984	Quebec	1–2	Montreal			Montreal Forum	2–1	
4	April 16, 1984	Quebec	4–3	Montreal	OT		Montreal Forum	2–2	
5	April 18, 1984	Montreal	4–0	Quebec			Quebec Coliseum	3–2	
6	April 20, 1984	Quebec	3–5	Montreal			Montreal Forum	4–2	

Wales Conference Finals vs. (P1) New York Islanders: Islanders win 4–2

Game	Date	Visitor	Score	Home	OT	Decision	Location Attendance	Series	Recap
1	April 24, 1984	NY Islanders	0–3	Montreal		Penney	Montreal Forum; 16,904	1–0	
2	April 26, 1984	NY Islanders	2–4	Montreal		Penney	Montreal Forum; 17,836	2–0	
3	April 28, 1984	Montreal	2–5	NY Islanders		Penney	Nassau Veterans Memorial Coliseum; 15,861	2–1	
4	May 1, 1984	Montreal	1–3	NY Islanders		Penney	Nassau Veterans Memorial Coliseum; 15,861	2–2	
5	May 3, 1984	NY Islanders	3–1	Montreal		Penney	Montreal Forum; 18,095	2–3	
6	May 5, 1984	Montreal	1–4	NY Islanders		Penney	Nassau Veterans Memorial Coliseum; 15,861	2–4	

Legend: Win Loss

== Playoffs ==
As fourth-place finishers, the Canadiens drew the division winner Boston Bruins as their first-round opponent. The Canadiens upset the Bruins, sweeping the series in three straight games their first playoff series victory since 1980. The Canadiens then faced off against the Quebec Nordiques in a "Battle of Quebec" which culminated in the Good Friday Brawl The Canadiens defeated the Nordiques four games to two to advance against the New York Islanders, the four-time defending Stanley Cup champions. The Islanders would eliminate the Canadiens in six games.

== Player statistics ==
=== Regular season ===
==== Scoring ====
Player	Pos	GP	G	A	Pts	PIM	+/-	PPG	SHG	GWG
Guy Lafleur	RW	80	30	40	70	19	-14	6	0	6
Mats Naslund	LW	77	29	35	64	4	5	3	0	1
Bobby Smith	C	70	26	37	63	62	-7	6	1	3
Guy Carbonneau	C	78	24	30	54	75	5	3	7	2
Ryan Walter	C/LW	73	20	29	49	83	-11	7	1	4
John Chabot	C	56	18	25	43	13	-2	4	1	2
Larry Robinson	D	74	9	34	43	39	4	4	0	1
Bob Gainey	LW	77	17	22	39	41	10	0	0	3
Mario Tremblay	RW	67	14	25	39	112	2	3	0	3
Pierre Mondou	C	52	15	22	37	8	9	3	1	1
Steve Shutt	LW	63	14	23	37	29	-18	4	0	2
Chris Nilan	RW	76	16	10	26	338	-4	4	0	1
Craig Ludwig	D	80	7	18	25	52	-10	0	0	1
Bill Root	D	72	4	13	17	45	26	1	1	0
Alfie Turcotte	C	30	7	7	14	10	-9	5	0	0
Perry Turnbull	C	40	6	7	13	59	-12	2	0	1
Jean Hamel	D	79	1	12	13	92	7	0	0	0
Ric Nattress	D	34	0	12	12	15	-11	0	0	0
Mark Hunter	RW	22	6	4	10	42	-2	1	0	0
Doug Wickenheiser	C	27	5	5	10	6	1	0	0	1
Keith Acton	C	9	3	7	10	4	-5	2	0	0
Kent Carlson	D	65	3	7	10	73	-15	0	0	2
Gilbert Delorme	D	27	2	7	9	8	-4	0	0	0
Mike McPhee	LW	14	5	2	7	41	4	0	0	0
Mark Napier	RW	5	3	2	5	0	0	0	0	1
Greg Paslawski	RW	26	1	4	5	4	-5	0	0	0
Rick Wamsley	G	42	0	3	3	6	0	0	0	0
Claude Lemieux	RW	8	1	1	2	12	-2	0	0	0
Chris Chelios	D	12	0	2	2	12	-5	0	0	0
Robert Picard	D	7	0	2	2	0	-1	0	0	0
Rick Green	D	7	0	1	1	7	-5	0	0	0
Dave Allison	D	3	0	0	0	12	-2	0	0	0
Normand Baron	LW	4	0	0	0	12	-2	0	0	0
Jocelyn Gauvreau	D	2	0	0	0	0	-2	0	0	0
Mark Holden	G	1	0	0	0	0	0	0	0	0
Bill Kitchen	D	3	0	0	0	2	0	0	0	0
Larry Landon	RW	2	0	0	0	0	2	0	0	0
Sergio Momesso	LW	1	0	0	0	0	1	0	0	0
John Newberry	C	3	0	0	0	0	0	0	0	0
Steve Penney	G	4	0	0	0	0	0	0	0	0
Richard Sevigny	G	40	0	0	0	12	0	0	0	0

==== Goaltending ====
Player	MIN	GP	W	L	T	GA	GAA	SO
Rick Wamsley	2333	42	19	17	3	144	3.70	2
Richard Sevigny	2203	40	16	18	2	124	3.38	1
Mark Holden	52	1	0	1	0	4	4.62	0
Steve Penney	240	4	0	4	0	19	4.75	0
Team:	4828	80	35	40	5	291	3.62	3

=== Playoffs ===
==== Scoring ====
Player	Pos	GP	G	A	Pts	PIM	PPG	SHG	GWG
Mats Naslund	LW	15	6	8	14	4	3	1	3
Chris Chelios	D	15	1	9	10	17	1	0	0
Steve Shutt	LW	11	7	2	9	8	2	0	0
Pierre Mondou	C	14	6	3	9	2	1	0	1
Mario Tremblay	RW	15	6	3	9	31	0	0	1
Bobby Smith	C	15	2	7	9	8	1	0	1
Guy Carbonneau	C	15	4	3	7	12	0	0	1
Bob Gainey	LW	15	1	5	6	9	0	0	0
John Chabot	C	11	1	4	5	0	0	0	1
Larry Robinson	D	15	0	5	5	22	0	0	0
Mark Hunter	RW	14	2	1	3	69	0	0	0
Ryan Walter	C/LW	15	2	1	3	4	1	0	1
Rick Green	D	15	1	2	3	33	0	0	0
Perry Turnbull	C	9	1	2	3	10	0	0	0
Guy Lafleur	RW	12	0	3	3	5	0	0	0
Craig Ludwig	D	15	0	3	3	23	0	0	0
Jean Hamel	D	15	0	2	2	16	0	0	0
Steve Penney	G	15	0	2	2	2	0	0	0
Mike McPhee	LW	15	1	0	1	31	0	0	0
Chris Nilan	RW	15	1	0	1	81	0	0	0
Normand Baron	LW	3	0	0	0	22	0	0	0
Rick Wamsley	G	1	0	0	0	0	0	0	0

==== Goaltending ====
Player	MIN	GP	W	L	GA	GAA	SO
Steve Penney	871	15	9	6	32	2.20	3
Rick Wamsley	32	1	0	0	0	0.00	0
Team:	903	15	9	6	32	2.13	3

Note:

Pos = Position;GP = Games played; G = Goals; A = Assists; Pts = Points; PIM = Penalty minutes; +/- = Plus/minus; PPG = Power-play goals; SHG = Short-handed goals; GWG = Game-winning goals
Pos = Position;GP = Games played; Min, TOI = Minutes played; W = Wins; L = Losses; T,T/OT = Ties; OTL = Overtime losses; GA = Goals-against; GAA = Goals-against average; SO = Shutouts; SA = Shots against; SV = Shots saved;SV% = Save percentage;

== Draft picks ==
Montreal's draft picks at the 1983 NHL entry draft held at the Montreal Forum in Montreal.

Round	#	Player	Nationality	College/Junior/Club team (League)
1	17	Alfie Turcotte	United States	Portland Winter Hawks (WHL)
2	26	Claude Lemieux	Canada	Trois-Rivières Draveurs (QMJHL)
2	27	Sergio Momesso	Canada	Shawinigan Cataractes (QMJHL)
2	35	Todd Francis	Canada	Brantford Alexanders (OHL)
3	45	Daniel Letendre	Canada	Quebec Remparts (QMJHL)
4	78	John Kordic	Canada	Portland Winter Hawks (WHL)
5	98	Dan Wurst	United States	Edina High School (USHS-MN)
6	118	Arto Javanainen	Finland	Pori (Finland)
7	138	Vladislav Tretiak	USSR	Moscow CSKA (USSR)
8	158	Rob Bryden	Canada	Henry Carr Crusaders (MetJHL)
9	178	Grant McKay	Canada	University of Calgary (CIAU)
10	198	Thomas Rundqvist	Sweden	Karlstad (Sweden)
11	218	Jeff Perpich	United States	Hibbing High School (USHS-MN)
12	238	Jean-Guy Bergeron	Canada	Shawinigan Cataractes (QMJHL)

== See also ==
- 1983–84 NHL season
