= 1983–84 Philadelphia Flyers season =

NHL hockey team season

1983–84 Philadelphia Flyers
- Division: 3rd Patrick
- Conference: 5th Wales
- 1983–84 record: 44–26–10
- Home record: 25–10–5
- Road record: 19–16–5
- Goals for: 350 (4th)
- Goals against: 290 (6th)

Team information
- General manager: Bob McCammon
- Coach: Bob McCammon
- Captain: Bobby Clarke
- Alternate captains: None (Note: The alternate captain position was abolished from the 1975–76 season through the 1984–85 season.)
- Arena: Spectrum
- Average attendance: 16,636
- Minor league affiliates: Springfield Indians; Toledo Goaldiggers

Team leaders
- Goals: Tim Kerr (54)
- Assists: Brian Propp (53)
- Points: Tim Kerr (93)
- Penalty minutes: Glen Cochrane (225)
- Plus/minus: Brian Propp (+49)
- Wins: Bob Froese (28)
- Goals against average: Bob Froese (3.15)

The 1983–84 Philadelphia Flyers season was the franchise's 17th season in the National Hockey League (NHL). During the final season of the playing careers of Hockey Hall of Famers Bill Barber and Bobby Clarke, the Flyers lost in the first round of the playoffs to the Washington Capitals in a three-game sweep.

== Off-season ==
Bob McCammon replaced Keith Allen as general manager in the off-season, and retained his position as head coach. McCammon had received an offer from the Pittsburgh Penguins to become their general manager.

== Regular season ==
The youth of the team began to take over the reins from the old guard as Tim Kerr recorded his first 50-goal season. The team finished in third place.

The 1983–84 regular season saw Barber play his final games as he would officially announce his retirement following the next season after being unable to return from reconstructive knee surgery.

=== Season standings ===
Patrick Division
	GP	W	L	T	GF	GA	Pts
**New York Islanders**	80	50	26	4	357	269	104
**Washington Capitals**	80	48	27	5	308	226	101
**Philadelphia Flyers**	80	44	26	10	350	290	98
**New York Rangers**	80	42	29	9	314	304	93
New Jersey Devils	80	17	56	7	231	350	41
Pittsburgh Penguins	80	16	58	6	254	390	38

Note: GP = Games played, W = Wins, L = Losses, T = Ties, Pts = Points, GF = Goals for, GA = Goals against
Note: Teams that qualified for the playoffs are highlighted in bold.

=== Record vs. opponents ===
Patrick Division record vs. opponents

==== Vs. Wales Conference ====
**Vs. Patrick Division**

1983–84 NHL records
Team	**NJD**	**NYI**	**NYR**	**PHI**	**PIT**	**WSH**	**Total**
New Jersey	—	0−7	1−5−1	0−7	3−4	0−5−2	4−28−3
N.Y. Islanders	7−0	—	3−4	4−3	6−1	4−3	24−11−0
N.Y. Rangers	5−1−1	4−3	—	4−3	5−2	3−3−1	21−12−2
Philadelphia	7−0	3−4	3−4	—	7−0	3−4	23−12−0
Pittsburgh	4−3	1−6	2−5	0–7	—	1−6	8−27−0
Washington	5−0−2	3−4	3−3−1	4–3	6–1	—	21−11−3

**Vs. Adams Division**

1983–84 NHL records
Team	**BOS**	**BUF**	**HFD**	**MTL**	**QUE**	**Total**
New Jersey	1−2	0−2−1	1−1−1	1−2	1−2	4−9−2
N.Y. Islanders	0−2−1	3−0	1−2	3−0	1−2	8−6−1
N.Y. Rangers	0−2−1	1−1−1	1−2	1−2	2−0−1	5−7−3
Philadelphia	1−1−1	0−3	1−2	2−0−1	2−0−1	6−6−3
Pittsburgh	0−3	0−3	2−1	0−2−1	0−3	2−12−1
Washington	1−2	0−2−1	2−1	3−0	1−2	7−7−1

==== Vs. Campbell Conference ====
**Vs. Norris Division**

1983–84 NHL records
Team	**CHI**	**DET**	**MIN**	**STL**	**TOR**	**Total**
New Jersey	2−1	2−1	1−2	0−3	0−3	5−10−0
N.Y. Islanders	3−0	1−2	2−0−1	1−1−1	2−1	9−4−2
N.Y. Rangers	2−1	3−0	1−1−1	2−1	1−2	9−5−1
Philadelphia	1−0−2	1−0−2	0−1−2	1−2	3−0	6−3−6
Pittsburgh	1−1−1	0−3	1−2	0−2−1	1−1−1	3−9−3
Washington	1−1−1	1−2	3−0	2−1	3−0	10−4−1

**Vs. Smythe Division**

1983–84 NHL records
Team	**CGY**	**EDM**	**LAK**	**VAN**	**WIN**	**Total**
New Jersey	0−2−1	0−2−1	2−1	1−2	1−2	4−9−2
N.Y. Islanders	0−3	3−0	2−0−1	3−0	1−2	9−5−1
N.Y. Rangers	2−1	1−2	1−0−2	1−1−1	2−1	7−5−3
Philadelphia	2−1	2−0−1	2−1	1−2	2−1	9−5−1
Pittsburgh	0−1−2	0−3	1−2	1−2	1−2	3−10−2
Washington	2−1	1−2	3−0	2−1	2−1	10−5−0

== Playoffs ==
The Flyers were swept in three games for the second consecutive season, this time by the Washington Capitals.

After the loss, Flyers President Jay Snider informed Bob McCammon he could no longer continue as head coach. As GM, McCammon disagreed a change was needed, so he resigned from both positions altogether on April 25. On May 15, Bobby Clarke retired from playing and was named vice president and general manager of the team.

== Schedule and results ==
=== Regular season ===
1983–84 regular season
October: 9–3–1, 19 points (home: 5–1–1; road: 4–2–0)

Game	Date	Score	Opponent	Decision	Record	Points	Recap
1	October 6	4–1	Washington Capitals	Lindbergh	1–0–0	2	W
2	October 8	6–3	@ Montreal Canadiens	Lindbergh	2–0–0	4	W
3	October 9	7–1	Pittsburgh Penguins	Lindbergh	3–0–0	6	W
4	October 13	4–3	Winnipeg Jets	Lindbergh	4–0–0	8	W
5	October 15	5–1	@ New York Islanders	Froese	5–0–0	10	W
6	October 16	4–5	@ New York Rangers	Froese	5–1–0	10	L
7	October 20	3–3 OT	Boston Bruins	Lindbergh	5–1–1	11	T
8	October 22	1–4	@ Washington Capitals	Lindbergh	5–2–1	11	L
9	October 23	8–5	Toronto Maple Leafs	Lindbergh	6–2–1	13	W
10	October 25	4–2	@ Quebec Nordiques	Lindbergh	7–2–1	15	W
11	October 27	4–3	Quebec Nordiques	Lindbergh	8–2–1	17	W
12	October 29	3–1	@ Pittsburgh Penguins	Froese	9–2–1	19	W
13	October 30	2–6	New York Islanders	Froese	9–3–1	19	L

November: 5–5–2, 12 points (home: 2–2–1; road: 3–3–1)

Game	Date	Score	Opponent	Decision	Record	Points	Recap
14	November 3	5–6	Los Angeles Kings	Lindbergh	9–4–1	19	L
15	November 5	6–7	@ St. Louis Blues	Lindbergh	9–5–1	19	L
16	November 6	4–2	Hartford Whalers	Froese	10–5–1	21	W
17	November 8	1–4	@ New York Islanders	Lindbergh	10–6–1	21	L
18	November 12	5–3	@ Toronto Maple Leafs	Froese	11–6–1	23	W
19	November 13	2–3	@ Winnipeg Jets	Froese	11–7–1	23	L
20	November 17	5–5 OT	Minnesota North Stars	Lindbergh	11–7–2	24	T
21	November 20	5–4 OT	Pittsburgh Penguins	Lindbergh	12–7–2	26	W
22	November 23	2–4	New York Islanders	Lindbergh	12–8–2	26	L
23	November 26	5–4	@ Vancouver Canucks	Lindbergh	13–8–2	28	W
24	November 29	8–5	@ Calgary Flames	Froese	14–8–2	30	W
25	November 30	3–3 OT	@ Edmonton Oilers	Froese	14–8–3	31	T

December: 6–3–3, 15 points (home: 3–2–1; road: 3–1–2)

Game	Date	Score	Opponent	Decision	Record	Points	Recap
26	December 3	6–3	@ Pittsburgh Penguins	Froese	15–8–3	33	W
27	December 4	5–6	Hartford Whalers	Froese	15–9–3	33	L
28	December 8	3–2	Chicago Black Hawks	Froese	16–9–3	35	W
29	December 10	8–2	@ New Jersey Devils	Lindbergh	17–9–3	37	W
30	December 11	5–6	Buffalo Sabres	Froese	17–10–3	37	L
31	December 15	9–4	Washington Capitals	Lindbergh	18–10–3	39	W
32	December 17	3–3 OT	@ Detroit Red Wings	Froese	18–10–4	40	T
33	December 18	3–3 OT	Detroit Red Wings	Lindbergh	18–10–5	41	T
34	December 21	3–3 OT	@ Chicago Black Hawks	Froese	18–10–6	42	T
35	December 22	5–0	New Jersey Devils	Lindbergh	19–10–6	44	W
36	December 26	5–4	@ Washington Capitals	Froese	20–10–6	46	W
37	December 30	3–6	@ New York Rangers	Lindbergh	20–11–6	46	L

January: 7–4–2, 16 points (home: 3–2–0; road: 4–2–2)

Game	Date	Score	Opponent	Decision	Record	Points	Recap
38	January 3	7–5	@ Pittsburgh Penguins	Froese	21–11–6	48	W
39	January 5	7–6 OT	Winnipeg Jets	Froese	22–11–6	50	W
40	January 7	8–4	@ Detroit Red Wings	Lindbergh	23–11–6	52	W
41	January 8	1–7	Washington Capitals	Lindbergh	23–12–6	52	L
42	January 11	2–6	@ Buffalo Sabres	Lindbergh	23–13–6	52	L
43	January 12	1–2	New York Rangers	Froese	23–14–6	52	L
44	January 14	3–3 OT	@ Quebec Nordiques	Froese	23–14–7	53	T
45	January 17	6–4	@ Montreal Canadiens	Froese	24–14–7	55	W
46	January 19	2–0	New Jersey Devils	Froese	25–14–7	57	W
47	January 21	7–1	New York Islanders	Froese	26–14–7	59	W
48	January 25	5–2	@ Los Angeles Kings	Froese	27–14–7	61	W
49	January 27	0–4	@ Vancouver Canucks	Froese	27–15–7	61	L
50	January 29	5–5 OT	@ Chicago Black Hawks	Froese	27–15–8	62	T

February: 7–5–2, 16 points (home: 5–2–2; road: 2–3–0)

Game	Date	Score	Opponent	Decision	Record	Points	Recap
51	February 2	2–2 OT	Montreal Canadiens	Froese	27–15–9	63	T
52	February 4	5–8	@ Boston Bruins	Lindbergh	27–16–9	63	L
53	February 5	7–0	Toronto Maple Leafs	Froese	28–16–9	65	W
54	February 9	4–3	Edmonton Oilers	Froese	29–16–9	67	W
55	February 11	3–6	@ Washington Capitals	Froese	29–17–9	67	L
56	February 12	5–6	Vancouver Canucks	Lindbergh	29–18–9	67	L
57	February 16	5–2	St. Louis Blues	Froese	30–18–9	69	W
58	February 18	4–3	New Jersey Devils	Froese	31–18–9	71	W
59	February 19	3–2 OT	@ New York Rangers	Froese	32–18–9	73	W
60	February 21	4–5 OT	Buffalo Sabres	Froese	32–19–9	73	L
61	February 23	3–3 OT	Minnesota North Stars	Froese	32–19–10	74	T
62	February 25	7–9	@ Hartford Whalers	Lindbergh	32–20–10	74	L
63	February 26	5–3	New York Islanders	Froese	33–20–10	76	W
64	February 29	5–3	@ Edmonton Oilers	Froese	34–20–10	78	W

March: 10–5–0, 20 points (home: 7–0–0; road: 3–5–0)

Game	Date	Score	Opponent	Decision	Record	Points	Recap
65	March 1	1–5	@ Calgary Flames	Froese	34–21–10	78	L
66	March 3	3–4	@ St. Louis Blues	Lindbergh	34–22–10	78	L
67	March 6	2–5	@ New York Islanders	Froese	34–23–10	78	L
68	March 8	4–1	Los Angeles Kings	Froese	35–23–10	80	W
69	March 10	3–4	@ Minnesota North Stars	Lindbergh	35–24–10	80	L
70	March 11	3–2	Calgary Flames	Froese	36–24–10	82	W
71	March 14	3–6	@ New York Rangers	Froese	36–25–10	82	L
72	March 15	6–3	Boston Bruins	Froese	37–25–10	84	W
73	March 17	6–4	New York Rangers	Froese	38–25–10	86	W
74	March 19	4–3	@ New Jersey Devils	Lindbergh	39–25–10	88	W
75	March 22	13–4	Pittsburgh Penguins	Lindbergh	40–25–10	90	W
76	March 24	6–5	New York Rangers	Froese	41–25–10	92	W
77	March 25	4–1	New Jersey Devils	Froese	42–25–10	94	W
78	March 28	5–3	@ Pittsburgh Penguins	Froese	43–25–10	96	W
79	March 30	6–2	@ New Jersey Devils	Lindbergh	44–25–10	98	W

April: 0–1–0, 0 points (home: 0–1–0; road: 0–0–0)

Game	Date	Score	Opponent	Decision	Record	Points	Recap
80	April 1	1–4	Washington Capitals	Froese	44–26–10	98	L

Legend: W Win (2 points) L Loss (0 points) T Tie (1 point)

=== Playoffs ===
1984 Stanley Cup playoffs
Patrick Division Semifinals vs. Washington Capitals – Capitals win 3–0

Game	Date	Score	Opponent	Decision	Series	Recap
1	April 4	2–4	@ Washington Capitals	Froese	Capitals lead 1–0	L
2	April 5	2–6	@ Washington Capitals	Froese	Capitals lead 2–0	L
3	April 7	1–5	Washington Capitals	Lindbergh	Capitals win 3–0	L

Legend: W Win L Loss

== Player statistics ==
=== Scoring ===
- Position abbreviations: C = Center; D = Defense; G = Goaltender; LW = Left wing; RW = Right wing
- † = Joined team via a transaction (e.g., trade, waivers, signing) during the season. Stats reflect time with the Flyers only.
- ‡ = Left team via a transaction (e.g., trade, waivers, release) during the season. Stats reflect time with the Flyers only.

No.	Player	Pos	Regular season						Playoffs					
No.	Player	Pos	GP	G	A	Pts	+/-	PIM	GP	G	A	Pts	+/-	PIM
12	Tim Kerr	RW	79	54	39	93	30	29	3	0	0	0	−4	0
26	Brian Propp	LW	79	39	53	92	49	37	3	0	1	1	−4	6
20	Dave Poulin	LW	73	31	45	76	31	47	3	0	0	0	−4	2
27	Darryl Sittler	C	76	27	36	63	13	38	3	0	2	2	−1	7
16	Bobby Clarke	C	73	17	43	60	23	70	3	2	1	3	−1	6
7	Bill Barber	LW	63	22	32	54	4	36	—	—	—	—	—	—
2	Mark Howe	D	71	19	34	53	30	44	3	0	0	0	0	2
14	Ron Sutter	C	79	19	32	51	4	101	3	0	0	0	0	22
23	Ilkka Sinisalo	LW	73	29	17	46	22	29	2	2	0	2	0	0
6	Thomas Eriksson	D	68	11	33	44	28	37	3	0	1	1	−4	0
3	Doug Crossman	D	78	7	28	35	23	63	3	0	0	0	−2	0
11	Len Hachborn	C	38	11	21	32	8	4	3	0	0	0	−2	7
9	Miroslav Dvorak	D	66	4	27	31	19	27	2	0	0	0	−5	2
15	Rich Sutter†	RW	70	16	12	28	10	93	3	0	0	0	0	15
10	Brad McCrimmon	D	71	0	24	24	19	76	1	0	0	0	−1	4
29	Glen Cochrane	D	67	7	16	23	16	225	—	—	—	—	—	—
17	Paul Holmgren‡	RW	52	9	13	22	1	105	—	—	—	—	—	—
21	Rick MacLeish‡	C	29	8	14	22	4	4	—	—	—	—	—	—
19	Ray Allison	RW	37	8	13	21	11	47	3	0	1	1	−2	4
8	Brad Marsh	D	77	3	14	17	24	83	3	1	1	2	−1	2
25	Paul Guay†	RW	14	2	6	8	1	14	3	0	0	0	−2	4
22	Ross Fitzpatrick	C	12	4	2	6	4	0	—	—	—	—	—	—
21	Dave Brown	RW	19	1	5	6	4	98	2	0	0	0	0	12
28	Daryl Stanley	D	23	1	4	5	4	71	3	0	0	0	−3	19
18	Lindsay Carson	C	16	1	3	4	−7	10	1	0	0	0	−1	5
11	Ron Flockhart‡	23	8	0	3	3	1	4	—	—	—	—	—	—
35	Bob Froese	G	48	0	2	2		10	3	0	0	0		0
31	Pelle Lindbergh	G	36	0	1	1		6	2	0	0	0		0
24	Randy Holt	D	26	0	0	0	−1	74	—	—	—	—	—	—
15	Mark Taylor‡	D	1	0	0	0	0	0	—	—	—	—	—	—
5	Frank Bathe	D	—	—	—	—	—	—	1	0	0	0	0	0

=== Goaltending ===
No.	Player	Regular season											Playoffs									
No.	Player	GP	GS	W	L	T	SA	GA	GAA	SV%	SO	TOI	GP	GS	W	L	SA	GA	GAA	SV%	SO	TOI
35	Bob Froese	48	46	28	13	7	1324	150	3.15	.887	2	2,855	3	2	0	2	76	11	4.37	.855	0	151
31	Pelle Lindbergh	36	34	16	13	3	963	135	4.07	.860	1	1,990	2	1	0	1	13	3	7.01	.769	0	26

== Awards and records ==
=== Awards ===
Type	Award/honor	Recipient	Ref
League (annual)	NHL All-Rookie Team	Thomas Eriksson (Defense)	
League (in-season)	NHL All-Star Game selection	Tim Kerr	
League (in-season)	NHL All-Star Game selection	Brian Propp	
League (in-season)	NHL Player of the Week	Pelle Lindbergh (October 11)	
League (in-season)	NHL Player of the Week	Tim Kerr (March 16)	
Team	Barry Ashbee Trophy	Miroslav Dvorak	
Team	Class Guy Award	Dave Poulin	

=== Records ===
Among the team records set during the 1983–84 season was the franchise high 350 goals scored on the season. On December 15 against the Washington Capitals, the Flyers scored three shorthanded goals during the game (tied for the team record) and three during the second period. On March 22 against the Pittsburgh Penguins, the Flyers scored 13 goals, a franchise high which was tied seven months later. 1984 was the final year of Bobby Clarke's team record twelve consecutive years in the playoffs streak dating back to 1973.

The 1983–84 season was the final NHL seasons for three longtime Flyers — Clarke, Bill Barber, and Rick MacLeish — who hold several career records for the team. Clarke holds the regular season marks for seasons played (15, tied with Claude Giroux), games played (1,144), assists (852), and points (1,210). Clarke also holds the playoff marks for seasons played (13), games played (136), assists (77), and points (119). Barber holds the regular season mark for goals scored (420) and is tied for the playoff mark for goals scored (53) with MacLeish.

=== Milestones ===
Milestone	Player	Date	Ref
400th goal	Bill Barber	October 9, 1983	
First game	Len Hachborn	November 20, 1983	
First game	Daryl Stanley	February 16, 1984	
First game	Paul Guay	March 6, 1984	
600th assist	Darryl Sittler	November 29, 1983	
1000th game played	Darryl Sittler	January 8, 1984	

=== Franchise firsts ===
Milestone	Player	Date	Ref
Overtime goal, regular season	Bobby Clarke	November 20, 1983	

== Transactions ==
The Flyers were involved in the following transactions from May 18, 1983, the day after the deciding game of the 1983 Stanley Cup Final, through May 19, 1984, the day of the deciding game of the 1984 Stanley Cup Final.

=== Trades ===
Date	Details		Ref
June 8, 1983	To Philadelphia Flyers: Doug Crossman; 2nd-round pick in 1984	To Chicago Black Hawks: Behn Wilson	
September 9, 1983 (Note: The trade was canceled after Gorence failed to make the Whalers out of training camp. Gorence was released after being returned to the Flyers and later signed with the Edmonton Oilers on November 1.)	To Philadelphia Flyers: Future considerations	To Hartford Whalers: Tom Gorence	
October 23, 1983	To Philadelphia Flyers: Rich Sutter; 2nd-round pick in 1984; 3rd-round pick in 1984	To Pittsburgh Penguins: Andy Brickley; Ron Flockhart; Mark Taylor; 1st-round pick in 1984; 3rd-round pick in 1984	
January 5, 1984	To Philadelphia Flyers: cash	To St. Louis Blues: Michel Larocque	
January 8, 1984	To Philadelphia Flyers: Future considerations	To Detroit Red Wings: Rick MacLeish	
February 23, 1984	To Philadelphia Flyers: Rights to Paul Guay; 3rd-round pick in 1985	To Minnesota North Stars: Paul Holmgren	

=== Players acquired ===
Date	Player	Former team	Term	Via	Ref
August 30, 1983	Randy Holt	Washington Capitals		Free agency	
October 6, 1983	Rick MacLeish	Pittsburgh Penguins	1-year	Free agency	
May 1, 1984	Darren Jensen	Fort Wayne Komets (IHL)	multi-year	Free agency	

=== Players lost ===
Date	Player	New team	Via	Ref
August 1, 1983	John Paddock	New Jersey Devils	Free agency	
August 15, 1983	Bob Hoffmeyer	New Jersey Devils	Free agency	
N/A	Gord Williams		Retirement	
October 1983	Tom Gorence	Edmonton Oilers (Note: Gorence signed with Edmonton on November 1.)	Release	
May 15, 1984	Bobby Clarke		Retirement	

=== Signings ===
Date	Player	Term	Ref
August 15, 1983	Thomas Eriksson	multi-year	
February 23, 1984	Paul Holmgren	2-year	
May 9, 1984	Todd Bergen	multi-year	
May 9, 1984	Dave Poulin	multi-year	
May 9, 1984	Rick Tocchet	multi-year	
May 9, 1984	Peter Zezel	multi-year	

== Draft picks ==
Philadelphia's picks at the 1983 NHL entry draft, which was held at the Montreal Forum in Montreal, on June 8, 1983.

Round	Pick	Player	Position	Nationality	Team (league)	Notes
2	41	Peter Zezel	Center	Canada	Toronto Marlboros (OHL)	
3	44	Derrick Smith	Left wing	Canada	Peterborough Petes (OHL)	(Note: The Flyers traded their first-round pick, 20th overall, their third-round pick, 61st overall, Greg Adams, and Ken Linseman to the Hartford Whalers for Mark Howe and the Whalers' third-round pick, 44th overall, on August 20, 1982.)
4	81	Allen Bourbeau	Center	United States	Acton-Boxborough Regional High School (Massachusetts)	
5	101	Jerome Carrier	Defense	Canada	Verdun Juniors (QMJHL)	
6	121	Rick Tocchet	Right wing	Canada	Sault Ste. Marie Greyhounds (OHL)	
7	141	Bob Mormina	Forward	Canada	Longueuil Chevaliers (QMJHL)	
8	161	Pelle Eklund	Center	Sweden	AIK (Elitserien)	
9	181	Robbie Nichols	Right wing	Canada	Kitchener Rangers (OHL)	
10	201	Bill McCormack	Center	United States	Westminster School (Conn.)	
11	221	Brian Jopling	Goaltender	United States	Williston Northampton School (Massachusetts)	
12	241	Harold Duvall	Left wing	United States	Belmont Hill School (Massachusetts)	

== Farm teams ==
The Flyers were affiliated with the Springfield Indians of the AHL and the Toledo Goaldiggers of the IHL.
