= 1983–84 New Jersey Devils season =

National Hockey League season

1983–84 New Jersey Devils
- Division: 5th Patrick
- Conference: 10th Wales
- 1983–84 record: 17–56–7
- Home record: 10–28–2
- Road record: 7–28–5
- Goals for: 231
- Goals against: 350

Team information
- General manager: Max McNab
- Coach: Bill MacMillan
- Captain: Don Lever
- Alternate captains: None
- Arena: Brendan Byrne Arena

Team leaders
- Goals: Mel Bridgman (23)
- Assists: Mel Bridgman (38)
- Points: Mel Bridgman (61)
- Penalty minutes: Pat Verbeek (158)
- Plus/minus: Glenn Merkosky (0)
- Wins: Glenn Resch (9)
- Goals against average: Glenn Resch (4.18)

The 1983–84 New Jersey Devils season was the 10th season for the National Hockey League (NHL) franchise that was established on June 11, 1974, and second season since the franchise relocated from Colorado prior to the 1982–83 NHL season. The Devils finished again in fifth place and did not qualify for the playoffs.

== Regular season ==
=== All Star Game ===
The 36th National Hockey League All-Star Game was played at Brendan Byrne Arena on January 31, 1984. The Wales Conference defeated the Campbell Conference 7–6. Chico Resch, Joe Cirella, and trainers Keith Parker and Craig Smith participated in the All Star Game as representatives of the Wales Conference.

=== Final standings ===
Patrick Division
	GP	W	L	T	GF	GA	Pts
**New York Islanders**	80	50	26	4	357	269	104
**Washington Capitals**	80	48	27	5	308	226	101
**Philadelphia Flyers**	80	44	26	10	350	290	98
**New York Rangers**	80	42	29	9	314	304	93
New Jersey Devils	80	17	56	7	231	350	41
Pittsburgh Penguins	80	16	58	6	254	390	38

Note: GP = Games played, W = Wins, L = Losses, T = Ties, Pts = Points, GF = Goals for, GA = Goals against
Note: Teams that qualified for the playoffs are highlighted in bold.

=== Record vs. opponents ===
Patrick Division record vs. opponents

==== Vs. Wales Conference ====
**Vs. Patrick Division**

1983–84 NHL records
Team	**NJD**	**NYI**	**NYR**	**PHI**	**PIT**	**WSH**	**Total**
New Jersey	—	0−7	1−5−1	0−7	3−4	0−5−2	4−28−3
N.Y. Islanders	7−0	—	3−4	4−3	6−1	4−3	24−11−0
N.Y. Rangers	5−1−1	4−3	—	4−3	5−2	3−3−1	21−12−2
Philadelphia	7−0	3−4	3−4	—	7−0	3−4	23−12−0
Pittsburgh	4−3	1−6	2−5	0–7	—	1−6	8−27−0
Washington	5−0−2	3−4	3−3−1	4–3	6–1	—	21−11−3

**Vs. Adams Division**

1983–84 NHL records
Team	**BOS**	**BUF**	**HFD**	**MTL**	**QUE**	**Total**
New Jersey	1−2	0−2−1	1−1−1	1−2	1−2	4−9−2
N.Y. Islanders	0−2−1	3−0	1−2	3−0	1−2	8−6−1
N.Y. Rangers	0−2−1	1−1−1	1−2	1−2	2−0−1	5−7−3
Philadelphia	1−1−1	0−3	1−2	2−0−1	2−0−1	6−6−3
Pittsburgh	0−3	0−3	2−1	0−2−1	0−3	2−12−1
Washington	1−2	0−2−1	2−1	3−0	1−2	7−7−1

==== Vs. Campbell Conference ====
**Vs. Norris Division**

1983–84 NHL records
Team	**CHI**	**DET**	**MIN**	**STL**	**TOR**	**Total**
New Jersey	2−1	2−1	1−2	0−3	0−3	5−10−0
N.Y. Islanders	3−0	1−2	2−0−1	1−1−1	2−1	9−4−2
N.Y. Rangers	2−1	3−0	1−1−1	2−1	1−2	9−5−1
Philadelphia	1−0−2	1−0−2	0−1−2	1−2	3−0	6−3−6
Pittsburgh	1−1−1	0−3	1−2	0−2−1	1−1−1	3−9−3
Washington	1−1−1	1−2	3−0	2−1	3−0	10−4−1

**Vs. Smythe Division**

1983–84 NHL records
Team	**CGY**	**EDM**	**LAK**	**VAN**	**WIN**	**Total**
New Jersey	0−2−1	0−2−1	2−1	1−2	1−2	4−9−2
N.Y. Islanders	0−3	3−0	2−0−1	3−0	1−2	9−5−1
N.Y. Rangers	2−1	1−2	1−0−2	1−1−1	2−1	7−5−3
Philadelphia	2−1	2−0−1	2−1	1−2	2−1	9−5−1
Pittsburgh	0−1−2	0−3	1−2	1−2	1−2	3−10−2
Washington	2−1	1−2	3−0	2−1	2−1	10−5−0

== Schedule and results ==
1983–84 regular season
October

Game	Result	Date	Score	Opponent	Record	Attendance
1	L	October 5, 1983	2–6	@ New York Rangers (1983–84)	0–1–0	17,403
2	L	October 7, 1983	1–3	New York Rangers (1983–84)	0–2–0	19,023
3	W	October 8, 1983	6–3	@ Detroit Red Wings (1983–84)	1–2–0	18,956
4	L	October 14, 1983	4–6	Quebec Nordiques (1983–84)	1–3–0	9,961
5	L	October 16, 1983	1–4	Toronto Maple Leafs (1983–84)	1–4–0	7,712
6	L	October 19, 1983	3–6	@ Chicago Black Hawks (1983–84)	1–5–0	14,683
7	L	October 21, 1983	4–5	@ Vancouver Canucks (1983–84)	1–6–0	12,000
8	L	October 22, 1983	3–8	@ Los Angeles Kings (1983–84)	1–7–0	9,643
9	L	October 26, 1983	0–2	Washington Capitals (1983–84)	1–8–0	9,387
10	L	October 29, 1983	3–5	@ New York Islanders (1983–84)	1–9–0	15,318
11	L	October 30, 1983	3–5	Pittsburgh Penguins (1983–84)	1–10–0	7,516

November

Game	Result	Date	Score	Opponent	Record	Attendance
12	L	November 2, 1983	4–5	@ Hartford Whalers (1983–84)	1–11–0	6,435
13	L	November 4, 1983	1–6	New York Islanders (1983–84)	1–12–0	14,981
14	W	November 6, 1983	6–3	Chicago Black Hawks (1983–84)	2–12–0	8,856
15	L	November 8, 1983	1–5	New York Rangers (1983–84)	2–13–0	19,023
16	L	November 9, 1983	1–2	@ Toronto Maple Leafs (1983–84)	2–14–0	16,225
17	L	November 12, 1983	3–4 OT	Calgary Flames (1983–84)	2–15–0	8,807
18	L	November 15, 1983	0–6	@ Minnesota North Stars (1983–84)	2–16–0	11,552
19	L	November 17, 1983	4–5	@ Calgary Flames (1983–84)	2–17–0	16,764
20	L	November 19, 1983	4–13	@ Edmonton Oilers (1983–84)	2–18–0	17,498
21	L	November 23, 1983	1–4	@ Pittsburgh Penguins (1983–84)	2–19–0	8,718
22	L	November 26, 1983	2–6	@ Boston Bruins (1983–84)	2–20–0	13,585
23	W	November 29, 1983	3–2	Chicago Black Hawks (1983–84)	3–20–0	10,322

December

Game	Result	Date	Score	Opponent	Record	Attendance
24	L	December 1, 1983	4–8	@ Washington Capitals (1983–84)	3–21–0	7,461
25	T	December 2, 1983	2–2 OT	Washington Capitals (1983–84)	3–21–1	9,678
26	W	December 4, 1983	6–0	Detroit Red Wings (1983–84)	4–21–1	8,582
27	W	December 7, 1983	6–3	Winnipeg Jets (1983–84)	5–21–1	8,221
28	L	December 10, 1983	2–8	Philadelphia Flyers (1983–84)	5–22–1	15,140
29	W	December 12, 1983	7–3	@ New York Rangers (1983–84)	6–22–1	17,282
30	T	December 14, 1983	3–3 OT	@ Buffalo Sabres (1983–84)	6–22–2	11,246
31	L	December 16, 1983	1–4	@ Winnipeg Jets (1983–84)	6–23–2	9,845
32	W	December 17, 1983	2–0	@ Minnesota North Stars (1983–84)	7–23–2	14,009
33	L	December 20, 1983	0–6	Montreal Canadiens (1983–84)	7–24–2	11,418
34	L	December 22, 1983	0–5	@ Philadelphia Flyers (1983–84)	7–25–2	15,948
35	L	December 23, 1983	5–6 OT	Pittsburgh Penguins (1983–84)	7–26–2	7,720
36	L	December 27, 1983	4–5 OT	St. Louis Blues (1983–84)	7–27–2	10,543
37	L	December 29, 1983	1–6	Detroit Red Wings (1983–84)	7–28–2	11,954
38	L	December 31, 1983	2–3	Washington Capitals (1983–84)	7–29–2	7,134

January

Game	Result	Date	Score	Opponent	Record	Attendance
39	L	January 4, 1984	3–4 OT	@ New York Rangers (1983–84)	7–30–2	17,416
40	W	January 6, 1984	3–1	Pittsburgh Penguins (1983–84)	8–30–2	10,193
41	W	January 7, 1984	7–4	@ Pittsburgh Penguins (1983–84)	9–30–2	7,237
42	L	January 10, 1984	2–4	@ New York Islanders (1983–84)	9–31–2	15,335
43	L	January 12, 1984	1–4	Quebec Nordiques (1983–84)	9–32–2	9,050
44	W	January 14, 1984	3–1	@ Montreal Canadiens (1983–84)	10–32–2	15,992
45	L	January 15, 1984	4–5	Edmonton Oilers (1983–84)	10–33–2	19,023
46	T	January 17, 1984	3–3 OT	@ Hartford Whalers (1983–84)	10–33–3	8,994
47	L	January 19, 1984	0–2	@ Philadelphia Flyers (1983–84)	10–34–3	16,602
48	L	January 20, 1984	3–4 OT	St. Louis Blues (1983–84)	10–35–3	10,134
49	T	January 25, 1984	2–2 OT	@ Calgary Flames (1983–84)	10–35–4	16,764
50	T	January 27, 1984	3–3 OT	@ Edmonton Oilers (1983–84)	10–35–5	17,498
51	L	January 29, 1984	2–3	@ Vancouver Canucks (1983–84)	10–36–5	13,184

February

Game	Result	Date	Score	Opponent	Record	Attendance
52	L	February 2, 1984	0–2	Washington Capitals (1983–84)	10–37–5	8,800
53	W	February 4, 1984	5–3	@ Quebec Nordiques (1983–84)	11–37–5	N/A
54	L	February 5, 1984	1–3	Minnesota North Stars (1983–84)	11–38–5	9,841
55	L	February 7, 1984	2–5	Montreal Canadiens (1983–84)	11–39–5	9,796
56	L	February 9, 1984	5–8	@ Buffalo Sabres (1983–84)	11–40–5	11,426
57	L	February 11, 1984	2–3	@ Pittsburgh Penguins (1983–84)	11–41–5	5,837
58	W	February 14, 1984	6–4	Los Angeles Kings (1983–84)	12–41–5	7,776
59	W	February 16, 1984	6–5 OT	Hartford Whalers (1983–84)	13–41–5	8,597
60	L	February 18, 1984	3–4	@ Philadelphia Flyers (1983–84)	13–42–5	16,971
61	L	February 19, 1984	4–5 OT	New York Islanders (1983–84)	13–43–5	16,556
62	L	February 22, 1984	5–8	Winnipeg Jets (1983–84)	13–44–5	8,889
63	L	February 25, 1984	1–7	@ New York Islanders (1983–84)	13–45–5	15,850
64	T	February 28, 1984	3–3 OT	New York Rangers (1983–84)	13–45–6	19,023

March

Game	Result	Date	Score	Opponent	Record	Attendance
65	W	March 2, 1984	4–2	Vancouver Canucks (1983–84)	14–45–6	10,864
66	W	March 4, 1984	5–3	Los Angeles Kings (1983–84)	15–45–6	10,286
67	W	March 6, 1984	6–5	Pittsburgh Penguins (1983–84)	16–45–6	9,231
68	L	March 7, 1984	4–8	@ Toronto Maple Leafs (1983–84)	16–46–6	16,207
69	L	March 10, 1984	5–6 OT	@ St. Louis Blues (1983–84)	16–47–6	14,187
70	L	March 13, 1984	1–5	New York Islanders (1983–84)	16–48–6	12,271
71	T	March 14, 1984	3–3 OT	@ Washington Capitals (1983–84)	16–48–7	10,365
72	W	March 17, 1984	5–3	@ Boston Bruins (1983–84)	17–48–7	13,830
73	L	March 19, 1984	3–4	Philadelphia Flyers (1983–84)	17–49–7	11,167
74	L	March 20, 1984	2–5	@ New York Islanders (1983–84)	17–50–7	15,668
75	L	March 22, 1984	3–5	New York Rangers (1983–84)	17–51–7	19,023
76	L	March 24, 1984	0–6	Buffalo Sabres (1983–84)	17–52–7	13,073
77	L	March 25, 1984	1–4	@ Philadelphia Flyers (1983–84)	17–53–7	17,191
78	L	March 28, 1984	2–6	@ Washington Capitals (1983–84)	17–54–7	15,807
79	L	March 30, 1984	2–6	Philadelphia Flyers (1983–84)	17–55–7	13,756

April

Game	Result	Date	Score	Opponent	Record	Attendance
80	L	April 1, 1984	1–3	Boston Bruins (1983–84)	17–56–7	14,640

Legend: Win (2 points) Loss (0 points) Tie (1 point)

== Player statistics ==
=== Regular season ===
Scoring

Player	Pos	GP	G	A	Pts	PIM	+/-	PPG	SHG	GWG
Mel Bridgman	C	79	23	38	61	121	-27	9	1	0
Jan Ludvig	RW	74	22	32	54	70	-18	7	0	2
Pat Verbeek	RW	79	20	27	47	158	-19	5	1	2
Joe Cirella	D	79	11	33	44	137	-43	6	0	0
Bob MacMillan	RW	71	17	23	40	23	-21	2	0	2
Aaron Broten	LW/C	80	13	23	36	36	-28	3	0	1
Don Lever	LW	70	14	19	33	44	-21	3	0	2
Paul Gagne	LW	66	14	18	32	33	-22	3	0	1
Phil Russell	D	76	9	22	31	96	-27	0	0	0
Tim Higgins	RW	37	18	10	28	27	-4	3	1	3
Rick Meagher	C	52	14	14	28	16	-9	2	0	2
Dave Cameron	C	67	9	12	21	85	-11	2	0	0
Murray Brumwell	D	42	7	13	20	14	-5	5	0	0
Jeff Larmer	LW	40	6	13	19	8	-17	0	0	0
Bob Hoffmeyer	D	58	4	12	16	61	-20	0	0	0
Gary McAdam	LW	38	9	6	15	15	-4	0	2	1
Bob Lorimer	D	72	2	10	12	62	-28	1	0	0
Mike Antonovich	C	38	3	5	8	16	-15	0	0	0
Yvon Vautour	RW	42	3	4	7	78	-18	0	0	1
Dave Lewis	D	66	2	5	7	63	-19	0	0	0
Ken Daneyko	D	11	1	4	5	17	-1	0	0	0
Mike Kitchen	D	43	1	4	5	24	-15	0	0	0
Robert Palmer	D	38	0	5	5	10	-10	0	0	0
Hector Marini	RW	32	2	2	4	47	-2	0	0	0
Larry Floyd	C	7	1	3	4	7	-4	0	0	0
Rich Chernomaz	RW	7	2	1	3	2	-3	0	0	0
Grant Mulvey	RW	12	1	2	3	19	-5	0	0	0
Kevin Maxwell	C	14	0	3	3	2	-9	0	0	0
Rocky Trottier	RW	5	1	1	2	0	-1	0	0	0
Bruce Driver	D	4	0	2	2	0	-2	0	0	0
Glenn Resch	G	51	0	2	2	12	0	0	0	0
John MacLean	RW	23	1	0	1	10	-7	0	0	0
Glenn Merkosky	C	5	1	0	1	0	0	0	0	0
Alan Hepple	D	1	0	0	0	7	-1	0	0	0
Garry Howatt	LW	6	0	0	0	14	-1	0	0	0
John Johannson	C	5	0	0	0	0	-2	0	0	0
Ron Low	G	44	0	0	0	4	0	0	0	0

Goaltending

Player	MIN	GP	W	L	T	GA	GAA	SO
Glenn Resch	2641	51	9	31	3	184	4.18	1
Ron Low	2218	44	8	25	4	161	4.36	0
Team:	4859	80	17	56	7	345	4.26	1

Note: GP = Games played; G = Goals; A = Assists; Pts = Points; +/- = Plus/minus; PIM = Penalty minutes; PPG=Power-play goals; SHG=Short-handed goals; GWG=Game-winning goals
MIN=Minutes played; W = Wins; L = Losses; T = Ties; GA = Goals against; GAA = Goals against average; SO = Shutouts;

== Draft picks ==
New Jersey's draft picks at the 1983 NHL entry draft held at the Montreal Forum in Montreal.

Round	#	Player	Nationality	College/Junior/Club team (League)
1	6	John MacLean	Canada	Oshawa Generals (OHL)
2	24	Shawn Evans	Canada	Peterborough Petes (OHL)
5	85	Chris Terreri	United States	Providence College (ECAC)
6	105	Gord Mark	Canada	Kamloops Blazers (WHL)
7	125	Greg Evtushevski	Canada	Kamloops Blazers (WHL)
8	145	Viacheslav Fetisov	Soviet Union	Moscow CSKA (USSR)
9	165	Jay Octeau	United States	Mount St. Charles Academy (USHS-RI)
10	185	Alexander Chernykh	Soviet Union	Voskresensk (USSR)
11	205	Allan Stewart	Canada	Prince Albert Raiders (WHL)
12	225	Alexei Kasatonov	Soviet Union	Moscow CSKA (USSR)

== See also ==
- 1983–84 NHL season
