= 1983–84 Edmonton Oilers season =

NHL team season

1983–84 Edmonton Oilers
- Stanley Cup champions
- Campbell Conference champions
- Smythe Division champions
- Division: 1st Smythe
- Conference: 1st Campbell
- 1983–84 record: 57–18–5
- Home record: 31–5–4
- Road record: 26–13–1
- Goals for: 446
- Goals against: 314

Team information
- General manager: Glen Sather
- Coach: Glen Sather
- Captain: Wayne Gretzky
- Alternate captains: None
- Arena: Northlands Coliseum
- Average attendance: 17,498 (100%)
- Minor league affiliates: Moncton Alpines (AHL); Montana Magic (CHL)

Team leaders
- Goals: Wayne Gretzky (87)
- Assists: Wayne Gretzky (118)
- Points: Wayne Gretzky (205)
- Penalty minutes: Mark Messier (165)
- Plus/minus: Wayne Gretzky (+76)
- Wins: Grant Fuhr (30)
- Goals against average: Andy Moog (3.77)

The 1983–84 Edmonton Oilers season was the Oilers' fifth season in the NHL. After an outstanding regular season, the Oilers won their first Stanley Cup.

== Regular season ==
It was another record breaking season for the club. The Oilers set club records in wins (57) and points (119), as they won the Smythe Division for the third straight season. Edmonton broke the NHL record for goals in a season, set by the Oilers the previous season, by scoring 446 times.

The Oilers got off to a strong start, winning 39 of their first 53 games. Wayne Gretzky started strong too, scoring a point or more in the first fifty-one games. After failing to score in the fifty-second, he missed six straight games along with Jari Kurri. After winning their first game without Gretzky and Kurri, the Oilers lost five in a row, including an 11–0 loss to the Hartford Whalers on Sunday, February 12, 1984. It was the first time in 230 consecutive regular-season games that the Oilers were shut out; the last time Edmonton had been shut out was on Thursday, March 12, 1981, when they lost at home, 5–0, to the New York Islanders. But, after a lecture from coach Glen Sather, and the return of Gretzky and Kurri, the Oilers won eight in a row and finished the season first overall in the NHL.

Wayne Gretzky broke the 200 point barrier for the second time in his career, as he won the Art Ross Trophy for the fourth straight year with 205 points. Gretzky scored an NHL high 87 goals and 118 assists. Paul Coffey would put up 126 points, the second-highest point total ever by a defenceman, while Jari Kurri (113) and Mark Messier (101) each broke the 100 point mark for the club. Glenn Anderson had a solid season, getting 54 goals, behind only Gretzky, and just miss the 100-point club as he finished with 99.

Grant Fuhr led the club with 30 victories, while Andy Moog put up a team best GAA of 3.77.

=== Season standings ===
Smythe Division
	GP	W	L	T	GF	GA	Pts
**Edmonton Oilers**	80	57	18	5	446	314	119
**Calgary Flames**	80	34	32	14	311	314	82
**Vancouver Canucks**	80	32	39	9	306	328	73
**Winnipeg Jets**	80	31	38	11	340	374	73
Los Angeles Kings	80	23	44	13	309	376	59

Note: GP = Games played, W = Wins, L = Losses, T = Ties, Pts = Points, GF = Goals for, GA = Goals against
Note: Teams that qualified for the playoffs are highlighted in bold.

=== Record vs. opponents ===
Smythe Division record vs. opponents

==== Vs. Campbell Conference ====
**Vs. Smythe Division**

1983–84 NHL records
Team	**CGY**	**EDM**	**LAK**	**VAN**	**WIN**	**Total**
Calgary	—	0−7−1	4−3−1	5−2−1	4−1−3	**13−13−6**
Edmonton	7−0−1	—	6−2	6−1−1	8−0	**27−3−2**
Los Angeles	3−4−1	2−6	—	4−3−1	0−5−3	**9−18−5**
Vancouver	2−5−1	1−6−1	3−4−1	—	5−2−1	**11−17−4**
Winnipeg	1−4−3	0−8	5−0−3	2−5−1	—	**8−17−7**

**Vs. Norris Division**

1983–84 NHL records
Team	**CHI**	**DET**	**MIN**	**STL**	**TOR**	**Total**
Calgary	2−1	1−2	2−1	2−0−1	1−0−2	**8−4−3**
Edmonton	2−1	3−0	2−0−1	1−2	2−1	**10−4−1**
Los Angeles	3−0	2−0−1	1−1−1	1−1−1	0−2−1	**7−4−4**
Vancouver	1−2	2−1	1−1−1	1−2	1−0−2	**6−6−3**
Winnipeg	2−1	0−1−2	1−2	2−1	3−0	**8−5−2**

**Vs. Wales Conference**

**Vs. Adams Division**

1983–84 NHL records
Team	**BOS**	**BUF**	**HFD**	**MTL**	**QUE**	**Total**
Calgary	0−2−1	0−3	2−0−1	1−2	1−2	**4−9−2**
Edmonton	2−1	2−1	2−1	2−1	3−0	**11−4−0**
Los Angeles	0−3	0−2−1	1−2	2−1	0−3	**3−11−1**
Vancouver	0−2−1	0−3	3−0	2−1	2−1	**7−7−1**
Winnipeg	1−2	0−3	2−0−1	1−1−1	2−1	**6−7−2**

**Vs. Patrick Division**

1983–84 NHL records
Team	**NJD**	**NYI**	**NYR**	**PHI**	**PIT**	**WSH**	**Total**
Calgary	2−0−1	3−0	1−2	1−2	1−0−2	1−2	**9−6−3**
Edmonton	2−0−1	0−3	2−1	0−2−1	3−0	2−1	**9−7−2**
Los Angeles	1−2	0−2−1	0−1−2	1−2	2−1	0−3	**4−11−3**
Vancouver	2−1	0−3	1−1–1	2−1	2−1	1−2	**8−9−1**
Winnipeg	2−1	2−1	1−2	1−2	2−1	1−2	**9−9−0**

== Schedule and results ==
1983–84 regular season
October: 9–2–1 (home: 4–0–1; road: 5–2–0)

Game	Date	Visitor	Score	Home	OT	Decision	Location Attendance	Record	Pts	Recap
1	October 5, 1983	Toronto	4–5	Edmonton		Fuhr	Northlands Coliseum; 17,498	1–0–0	2	
2	October 7, 1983	Edmonton	8–6	Winnipeg		Moog	Winnipeg Arena; 11,073	2–0–0	4	
3	October 9, 1983	Minnesota	3–4	Edmonton	OT	Fuhr	Northlands Coliseum; 17,498	3–0–0	6	
4	October 12, 1983	Detroit	3–8	Edmonton		Moog	Northlands Coliseum; 17,498	4–0–0	8	
5	October 15, 1983	Edmonton	4–3	Calgary		Fuhr	Olympic Saddledome; 16,764	5–0–0	10	
6	October 16, 1983	Calgary	1–5	Edmonton		Moog	Northlands Coliseum; 17,498	6–0–0	12	
7	October 19, 1983	Edmonton	10–7	Vancouver		Moog	Pacific Coliseum; 14,701	7–0–0	14	
8	October 20, 1983	Edmonton	2–7	Los Angeles		Moog	The Forum; 9,413	7–1–0	14	
9	October 22, 1983	Vancouver	5–5	Edmonton	OT	Fuhr	Northlands Coliseum; 17,498	7–1–1	15	
10	October 26, 1983	Edmonton	3–8	Toronto		Moog	Maple Leaf Gardens; 16,382	7–2–1	15	
11	October 29, 1983	Edmonton	3–1	Montreal		Fuhr	Montreal Forum; 17,781	8–2–1	17	
12	October 30, 1983	Edmonton	5–4	NY Rangers	OT	Fuhr	Madison Square Garden; 17,412	9–2–1	19	

November: 10–2–2 (home: 5–0–1; road: 5–2–1)

Game	Date	Visitor	Score	Home	OT	Decision	Location Attendance	Record	Pts	Recap
13	November 2, 1983	Washington	3–11	Edmonton		Fuhr	Northlands Coliseum; 17,498	10–2–1	21	
14	November 5, 1983	Pittsburgh	3–7	Edmonton		Moog	Northlands Coliseum; 17,498	11–2–1	23	
15	November 6, 1983	Edmonton	8–5	Winnipeg		Fuhr	Winnipeg Arena; 13,376	12–2–1	25	
16	November 8, 1983	Edmonton	7–4	Quebec		Fuhr	Quebec Coliseum; 15,272	13–2–1	27	
17	November 9, 1983	Edmonton	7–4	Washington		Fuhr	Capital Centre; 11,495	14–2–1	29	
18	November 12, 1983	Edmonton	7–3	Detroit		Moog	Joe Louis Arena; 20,088	15–2–1	31	
19	November 13, 1983	Edmonton	3–5	Chicago		Fuhr	Chicago Stadium; 17,534	15–3–1	31	
20	November 18, 1983	Buffalo	0–7	Edmonton		Fuhr	Northlands Coliseum; 17,498	16–3–1	33	
21	November 19, 1983	New Jersey	4–13	Edmonton		Fuhr	Northlands Coliseum; 17,498	17–3–1	35	
22	November 21, 1983	Winnipeg	6–7	Edmonton		Fuhr	Northlands Coliseum; 17,498	18–3–1	37	
23	November 23, 1983	Edmonton	7–3	Los Angeles		Fuhr	The Forum; 14,578	19–3–1	39	
24	November 25, 1983	Edmonton	2–2	Minnesota	OT	Fuhr	Met Center; 15,784	19–3–2	40	
25	November 26, 1983	Edmonton	6–8	St. Louis		Moog	St. Louis Arena; 17,720	19–4–2	40	
26	November 30, 1983	Philadelphia	3–3	Edmonton	OT	Fuhr	Northlands Coliseum; 17,498	19–4–3	41	

December: 9–3–1 (home: 5–1–1; road: 4–2–0)

Game	Date	Visitor	Score	Home	OT	Decision	Location Attendance	Record	Pts	Recap
27	December 3, 1983	Los Angeles	3–7	Edmonton		Fuhr	Northlands Coliseum; 17,498	20–4–3	43	
28	December 4, 1983	NY Islanders	4–2	Edmonton		Fuhr	Northlands Coliseum; 17,498	20–5–3	43	
29	December 7, 1983	Vancouver	4–5	Edmonton		Fuhr	Northlands Coliseum; 17,498	21–5–3	45	
30	December 10, 1983	Edmonton	2–3	Vancouver		Moog	Pacific Coliseum; 15,399	21–6–3	45	
31	December 13, 1983	Edmonton	5–8	NY Islanders		Fuhr	Nassau Veterans Memorial Coliseum; 15,850	21–7–3	45	
32	December 14, 1983	Edmonton	9–4	NY Rangers		Moog	Madison Square Garden; 17,408	22–7–3	47	
33	December 17, 1983	Quebec	1–8	Edmonton		Moog	Northlands Coliseum; 17,498	23–7–3	49	
34	December 18, 1983	Edmonton	7–5	Winnipeg		Moog	Winnipeg Arena; 15,107	24–7–3	51	
35	December 21, 1983	Winnipeg	4 – 7	Edmonton		Moog	Northlands Coliseum; 17,498	25–7–3	53	
36	December 23, 1983	Calgary	5–5	Edmonton	OT	Moog	Northlands Coliseum; 17,498	25–7–4	54	
37	December 26, 1983	Edmonton	6–3	Calgary		Fuhr	Olympic Saddledome; 16,764	26–7–4	56	
38	December 28, 1983	Edmonton	4–2	Vancouver		Moog	Pacific Coliseum; 16,543	27–7–4	58	
39	December 30, 1983	Boston	0–2	Edmonton		Fuhr	Northlands Coliseum; 17,498	28–7–4	60	

January: 10–2–1 (home: 4–1–1; road: 6–1–0)

Game	Date	Visitor	Score	Home	OT	Decision	Location Attendance	Record	Pts	Recap
40	January 3, 1984	Edmonton	9–6	Calgary		Moog	Olympic Saddledome; 16,764	29–7–4	62	
41	January 4, 1984	Minnesota	8–12	Edmonton		Fuhr	Northlands Coliseum; 17,498	30–7–4	64	
42	January 7, 1984	Hartford	3–5	Edmonton		Moog	Northlands Coliseum; 17,498	31–7–4	66	
43	January 9, 1984	Edmonton	7–3	Detroit		Fuhr	Joe Louis Arena; 19,557	32–7–4	68	
44	January 11, 1984	Edmonton	5–3	Chicago		Moog	Chicago Stadium; 17,792	33–7–4	70	
45	January 13, 1984	Edmonton	1–3	Buffalo		Fuhr	Buffalo Memorial Auditorium; 16,433	33–8–4	70	
46	January 15, 1984	Edmonton	5–4	New Jersey		Moog	Brendan Byrne Arena; 19,023	34–8–4	72	
47	January 18, 1984	Vancouver	5–7	Edmonton		Fuhr	Northlands Coliseum; 17,498	35–8–4	74	
48	January 20, 1984	Los Angeles	5–7	Edmonton		Moog	Northlands Coliseum; 17,498	36–8–4	76	
49	January 21, 1984	Edmonton	6–3	Los Angeles		Fuhr	The Forum; 16,005	37–8–4	78	
50	January 25, 1984	Edmonton	6–4	Vancouver		Moog	Pacific Coliseum; 6,853	38–8–4	80	
51	January 27, 1984	New Jersey	3–3	Edmonton	OT	Fuhr	Northlands Coliseum; 17,498	38–8–5	81	
52	January 28, 1984	Los Angeles	4–2	Edmonton		Moog	Northlands Coliseum; 17,498	38–9–5	81	

February: 9–6–0 (home: 6–1–0; road: 3–5–0)

Game	Date	Visitor	Score	Home	OT	Decision	Location Attendance	Record	Pts	Recap
53	February 3, 1984	Calgary	5–10	Edmonton		Fuhr	Northlands Coliseum; 17,498	39–9–5	83	
54	February 5, 1984	Edmonton	2–9	Washington		Fuhr	Capital Centre; 18,130	39–10–5	83	
55	February 7, 1984	Edmonton	3–5	NY Islanders		Moog	Nassau Veterans Memorial Coliseum; 15,806	39–11–5	83	
56	February 9, 1984	Edmonton	3–4	Philadelphia		Fuhr	The Spectrum; 17,191	39–12–5	83	
57	February 11, 1984	Edmonton	1–4	Boston		Moog	Boston Garden; 14,451	39–13–5	83	
58	February 12, 1984	Edmonton	0–11	Hartford		Fuhr	Hartford Civic Center; 14,817	39–14–5	83	
59	February 15, 1984	Winnipeg	4–7	Edmonton		Fuhr	Northlands Coliseum; 17,498	40–14–5	85	
60	February 17, 1984	Boston	2–5	Edmonton		Fuhr	Northlands Coliseum; 17,498	41–14–5	87	
61	February 19, 1984	Pittsburgh	3–7	Edmonton		Moog	Northlands Coliseum; 17,498	42–14–5	89	
62	February 21, 1984	Edmonton	6–5	St. Louis		Fuhr	St. Louis Arena; 16,145	43–14–5	91	
63	February 22, 1984	Edmonton	9–2	Pittsburgh		Moog	Pittsburgh Civic Arena; 15,838	44–14–5	93	
64	February 24, 1984	Calgary	3–5	Edmonton		Fuhr	Northlands Coliseum; 17,498	45–14–5	95	
65	February 25, 1984	Toronto	3–8	Edmonton		Moog	Northlands Coliseum; 17,498	46–14–5	97	
66	February 27, 1984	Edmonton	6–5	Winnipeg	OT	Fuhr	Winnipeg Arena; 15,736	47–14–5	99	
67	February 29, 1984	Philadelphia	5–3	Edmonton		Moog	Northlands Coliseum; 17,498	47–15–5	99	

March: 10–3–0 (home: 7–2–0; road: 3–1–0)

Game	Date	Visitor	Score	Home	OT	Decision	Location Attendance	Record	Pts	Recap
68	March 4, 1984	Montreal	1–6	Edmonton		Fuhr	Northlands Coliseum; 17,498	48–15–5	101	
69	March 7, 1984	Chicago	4–7	Edmonton		Fuhr	Northlands Coliseum; 17,498	49–15–5	103	
70	March 10, 1984	NY Rangers	3–2	Edmonton		Fuhr	Northlands Coliseum; 17,498	49–16–5	103	
71	March 11, 1984	Vancouver	2–12	Edmonton		Moog	Northlands Coliseum; 17,498	50–16–5	105	
72	March 13, 1984	Edmonton	6–5	Quebec	OT	Moog	Quebec Coliseum; 15,326	51–16–5	107	
73	March 15, 1984	Edmonton	2–3	Montreal		Fuhr	Montreal Forum; 18,076	51–17–5	107	
74	March 17, 1984	Los Angeles	1–9	Edmonton		Moog	Northlands Coliseum; 17,498	52–17–5	109	
75	March 18, 1984	Buffalo	3–4	Edmonton		Fuhr	Northlands Coliseum; 17,498	53–17–5	111	
76	March 21, 1984	Hartford	3–5	Edmonton		Moog	Northlands Coliseum; 17,498	54–17–5	113	
77	March 24, 1984	St. Louis	7–1	Edmonton		Fuhr	Northlands Coliseum; 17,498	54–18–5	113	
78	March 25, 1984	Winnipeg	2–3	Edmonton		Moog	Northlands Coliseum; 17,498	55–18–5	115	
79	March 27, 1984	Edmonton	9–2	Calgary		Fuhr	Olympic Saddledome; 16,764	56–18–5	117	
80	March 31, 1984	Edmonton	4–3	Los Angeles		Moog	The Forum; 15,007	57–18–5	119	

Legend: Win (2 points) Loss (0 points) Tie (1 point)

== Playoffs ==
In the playoffs, the Oilers made short work of the Winnipeg Jets, sweeping them in 3 games, and then faced their Battle of Alberta rivals, the Calgary Flames for the Smythe Division finals. The Flames pushed the Oilers to seven games before Edmonton defeated them for the second straight year. The Oilers swept the Minnesota North Stars in the Campbell Conference final, setting up a Stanley Cup rematch against the New York Islanders. The Islanders, who swept the Oilers the previous year, were looking to win their fifth straight Stanley Cup. Edmonton, however, had other plans, and after the teams split the first two games in New York, the Oilers won three in a row at home to win the series in five games, becoming the first team from the WHA to win the Stanley Cup. Mark Messier won the Conn Smythe Trophy as the playoff MVP.

1984 Stanley Cup playoffs
Smythe Division Semifinals vs. (S4) Winnipeg Jets – Oilers win 3–0

Game	Date	Visitor	Score	Home	OT	Decision	Location Attendance	Series	Recap
1	April 4, 1984	Winnipeg	2–9	Edmonton		Fuhr	Northlands Coliseum; 17,197	1–0	
2	April 5, 1984	Winnipeg	4–5	Edmonton	OT	Fuhr	Northlands Coliseum; 17,390	2–0	
3	April 7, 1984	Edmonton	4–1	Winnipeg		Fuhr	Winnipeg Arena; 12,497	3–0	

Smythe Division Finals vs. (S2) Calgary Flames – Oilers win 4–3

Game	Date	Visitor	Score	Home	OT	Decision	Location Attendance	Series	Recap
1	April 12, 1984	Calgary	2–5	Edmonton		Fuhr	Northlands Coliseum; 17,498	1–0	
2	April 13, 1984	Calgary	6–5	Edmonton	OT	Fuhr	Northlands Coliseum; 17,498	1–1	
3	April 15, 1984	Edmonton	3–2	Calgary		Fuhr	Olympic Saddledome; 16,706	2–1	
4	April 16, 1984	Edmonton	5–3	Calgary		Fuhr	Olympic Saddledome; 16,706	3–1	
5	April 18, 1984	Calgary	5–4	Edmonton		Fuhr	Northlands Coliseum; 17,498	3–2	
6	April 20, 1984	Edmonton	4–5	Calgary	OT	Fuhr	Olympic Saddledome; 16,764	3–3	
7	April 22, 1984	Calgary	4–7	Edmonton		Fuhr	Northlands Coliseum; 17,498	4–3	

Campbell Conference Finals vs. (N1) Minnesota North Stars – Oilers win 4–0

Game	Date	Visitor	Score	Home	OT	Decision	Location Attendance	Series	Recap
1	April 24, 1984	Minnesota	1–7	Edmonton		Fuhr	Northlands Coliseum; 17,498	1–0	
2	April 26, 1984	Minnesota	3–4	Edmonton		Moog	Northlands Coliseum; 17,498	2–0	
3	April 28, 1984	Edmonton	8–5	Minnesota		Moog	Met Center; 15,784	3–0	
4	May 1, 1984	Edmonton	3–1	Minnesota		Fuhr	Met Center; 15,507	4–0	

Stanley Cup Final vs. (P1) New York Islanders – Oilers win 4–1

Game	Date	Visitor	Score	Home	OT	Decision	Location Attendance	Series	Recap
1	May 10, 1984	Edmonton	1–0	NY Islanders		Fuhr	Nassau Veterans Memorial Coliseum; 15,861	1–0	
2	May 12, 1984	Edmonton	1–6	NY Islanders		Fuhr	Nassau Veterans Memorial Coliseum; 15,861	1–1	
3	May 15, 1984	NY Islanders	2–7	Edmonton		Fuhr	Northlands Coliseum; 17,498	2–1	
4	May 17, 1984	NY Islanders	2–7	Edmonton		Moog	Northlands Coliseum; 17,498	3–1	
5	May 19, 1984	NY Islanders	2–5	Edmonton		Moog	Northlands Coliseum; 17,498	4–1	

Legend: Win Loss

== Player statistics ==
=== Regular season ===
Scoring leaders

Player	GP	G	A	Pts	PIM
Wayne Gretzky	74	87	118	205	39
Paul Coffey	80	40	86	126	104
Jari Kurri	64	52	61	113	14
Mark Messier	73	37	64	101	165
Glenn Anderson	80	54	45	99	65

Goaltending

Player	GP	TOI	W	L	T	GA	SO	Save %	GAA
Andy Moog	38	2212	27	8	1	139	1	.882	3.77
Grant Fuhr	45	2625	30	10	4	171	1	.883	3.91

=== Playoffs ===
Scoring leaders

Player	GP	G	A	Pts	PIM
Wayne Gretzky	19	13	22	35	12
Jari Kurri	19	14	14	28	13
Mark Messier	19	8	18	26	19
Paul Coffey	19	8	14	22	21
Glenn Anderson	19	6	11	17	33

Goaltending

Player	GP	TOI	W	L	GA	SO	Save %	GAA
Andy Moog	7	263	4	0	12	0	.891	2.74
Grant Fuhr	16	883	11	4	44	1	.910	2.99

== Awards and records ==
=== Records ===
- 446: An NHL team record for most goals in a single season.

- 425: A new NHL team record for most goals in a single season on March 21, 1984.

- 12: An NHL record for most short-handed goals in a single season by Wayne Gretzky.

- 11: A new NHL record for most short-handed goals in a single season by Wayne Gretzky on February 15, 1984.

=== Milestones ===
Regular Season
Player	Milestone	Reached
Don Jackson	200th NHL PIM	October 15, 1983
Dave Hunter	400th NHL PIM	October 16, 1983
Willy Lindstrom	200th NHL Point; 300th NHL Game	October 22, 1983
Mark Messier	300th NHL Point	October 22, 1983
Jaroslav Pouzar	100th NHL Game	October 26, 1983
Dave Semenko	600th NHL PIM	October 26, 1983
Wayne Gretzky	19th NHL Hat-trick; 5th Four-Goal NHL Game	November 6, 1983
Jari Kurri	100th NHL PIM	November 6, 1983
Wayne Gretzky	20th NHL Hat-trick	November 12, 1983
Randy Gregg	100th NHL Point	November 18, 1983
Jari Kurri	300th NHL Point	November 18, 1983
Dave Lumley	2nd NHL Gordie Howe hat trick	November 18, 1983
Grant Fuhr	10th NHL Assist	November 19, 1983
Wayne Gretzky	21st NHL Hat-trick	November 19, 1983
Jari Kurri	6th NHL Hat-trick; 1st Five-Goal NHL Game	November 19, 1983
Willy Lindstrom	3rd NHL Hat-trick	November 19, 1983
Jim Playfair	1st NHL Game; 1st NHL Goal; 1st NHL Assist; 1st NHL Point	November 19, 1983
Todd Strueby	1st NHL Assist; 1st NHL Point	November 19, 1983
Dave Lumley	500th NHL PiM	November 26, 1983
Glenn Anderson	6th NHL Hat-trick	December 3, 1983
Grant Fuhr	100th NHL Game	December 7, 1983
Wayne Gretzky	300th NHL Goal	December 13, 1983
Willy Lindstrom	100th NHL Assist	December 13, 1983
Glenn Anderson	300th NHL Point	December 14, 1983
Wayne Gretzky	22nd NHL Hat-trick	December 14, 1983
Wayne Gretzky	500th NHL Assist; 800th NHL Point	December 17, 1983
Wayne Gretzky	23rd NHL Hat-trick	December 21, 1983
Mark Messier	500th NHL PIM	December 23, 1983
Jari Kurri	200th NHL Assist	December 26, 1983
Grant Fuhr	1st NHL Shutout	December 30, 1983
Dave Hunter	100th NHL Assist	January 3, 1984
Wayne Gretzky	24th NHL Hat-trick; 6th Four-Goal NHL Game	January 4, 1984
Jari Kurri	7th NHL Hat-trick	January 4, 1984
Ken Linseman	800th NHL PIM	January 4, 1984
Dean Clark	1st NHL Game	January 7, 1984
Steve Graves	1st NHL Game	January 7, 1984
Wayne Gretzky	50th Goal in 42 Games; 25th NHL Hat-trick	January 7, 1984
Mark Messier	200th NHL Assist	January 7, 1984
Ray Cote	1st NHL Game	January 9, 1984
Charlie Huddy	100th NHL Point	January 9, 1984
Glenn Anderson	200th NHL PIM	January 15, 1984
Paul Coffey	400th NHL PIM	January 18, 1984
Wayne Gretzky	26th NHL Hat-trick	January 18, 1984
Pat Hughes	100th NHL Goal	January 20, 1984
Rick Chartraw	400th NHL Game	January 28, 1984
Tom Gorence	300th NHL Game	January 28, 1984
Kevin McClelland	200th NHL PIM	January 28, 1984
Paul Coffey	200th NHL Assist	February 3, 1984
Lee Fogolin	1,000th NHL PIM	February 3, 1984
Pat Hughes	200th NHL Point; 2nd NHL Hat-trick; 1st Five-Goal NHL Game	February 3, 1984
Kevin McClelland	100th NHL Game	February 9, 1984
Don Jackson	300th NHL PIM	February 11, 1984
Pat Hughes	500th NHL PIM	February 12, 1984
Lee Fogolin	700th NHL Game	February 15, 1984
Paul Coffey	300th NHL Point	February 17, 1984
Kevin Lowe	300th NHL PIM	February 17, 1984
Wayne Gretzky	27th NHL Hat-trick; 7th Four-Goal NHL Game	February 21, 1984
Randy Gregg	100th NHL PIM	February 22, 1984
Wayne Gretzky	28th NHL Hat-trick; 8th Four-Goal NHL Game	February 22, 1984
Mark Messier	6th NHL Hat-trick	February 25, 1984
Paul Coffey	300th NHL Game; 100th NHL Goal	February 27, 1984
Dave Lumley	200th NHL Point	February 27, 1984
Dave Semenko	300th NHL Game	February 29, 1984
Jari Kurri	8th NHL Hat-trick	March 7, 1984
Jari Kurri	9th NHL Hat-trick	March 11, 1984
Mark Messier	7th NHL Hat-trick	March 11, 1984
Wayne Gretzky	900th NHL Point	March 13, 1984
Dave Semenko	100th NHL Point	March 13, 1984
Jari Kurri	50th Goal in 73 Games	March 15, 1984
Jaroslav Pouzar	100th NHL PIM	March 15, 1984
Glenn Anderson	7th NHL Hat-trick	March 17, 1984
Pat Hughes	100th NHL Assist	March 17, 1984
Andy Moog	100th NHL Game	March 17, 1984
Pat Hughes	400th NHL Game	March 18, 1984
Glenn Anderson	50th Goal in 76 Games; 8th NHL Hat-trick; 1st Four-Goal NHL Game	March 21, 1984
Grant Fuhr	20th NHL Assist	March 27, 1984
Kevin McClelland	1st NHL Gordie Howe Hat-trick	March 27, 1984
Gord Sherven	1st NHL Game	March 27, 1984
Raimo Summanen	1st NHL Game; 1st NHL Assist; 1st NHL Point	March 27, 1984
Gord Sherven	1st NHL Goal; 1st NHL Point	March 31, 1984
Raimo Summanen	1st NHL Goal	March 31, 1984

Playoffs
Player	Milestone	Reached
Wayne Gretzky	50th NHL Assist	April 4, 1984
Jari Kurri	1st NHL Hat-trick	April 4, 1984
Raimo Summanen	1st NHL Game; 1st NHL Assist; 1st NHL Point	April 4, 1984
Glenn Anderson	1st NHL Gordie Howe Hat-trick	April 5, 1984
Raimo Summanen	1st NHL Goal	April 5, 1984
Pat Hughes	50th NHL PIM	April 7, 1984
Jari Kurri	50th NHL Point	April 12, 1984
Paul Coffey	50th NHL PIM	April 15, 1984
Dave Semenko	100th NHL PIM	April 15, 1984
Pat Hughes	50th NHL Game	April 24, 1984
Mark Messier	50th NHL Point	April 24, 1984
Glenn Anderson	50th NHL Point	April 26, 1984
Jaroslav Pouzar	1st NHL Assist	April 26, 1984
Wayne Gretzky	100th NHL Point	April 28, 1984
Larry Melnyk	50th NHL PIM	April 28, 1984
Grant Fuhr	1st NHL Shutout	May 10, 1984
Don Jackson	50th NHL PIM	May 10, 1984
Ken Linseman	200th NHL PIM	May 12, 1984
Mark Messier	50th NHL PIM	May 12, 1984
Wayne Gretzky	50th NHL Game	May 15, 1984
Dave Hunter	50th NHL Game	May 15, 1984
Kevin Lowe	50th NHL Game	May 15, 1984
Pat Conacher	1st NHL Goal	May 17, 1984
Dave Lumley	100th NHL PIM	May 17, 1984
Mark Messier	50th NHL Game	May 17, 1984
Dave Lumley	50th NHL Game	May 19, 1984

== Transactions ==
=== Trades ===
December 5, 1983	To Pittsburgh Penguins Tom Roulston	To Edmonton Oilers Kevin McClelland; 6th-round pick in 1984
January 20, 1984	To New York Rangers 9th-round pick in 1984	To Edmonton Oilers Rick Chartraw
March 6, 1984	To Boston Bruins John Blum	To Edmonton Oilers Larry Melnyk
March 6, 1984	To Washington Capitals 4th-round pick in 1985	To Edmonton Oilers Risto Jalo

=== Players acquired ===
Date	Player	Former team	Term
August 23, 1985	Mike Krensing	Minnesota Duluth Bulldogs (NCAA)	
August 23, 1985	Doug Kyle	Saskatoon Blades (WHL)	
August 23, 1985	Ross Lambert	Saskatoon Blades (WHL)	
August 23, 1985	Tom Rowe	Detroit Red Wings	2-year
August 23, 1985	Bart Yachimec	Springfield Indians (AHL)	
	Pat Conacher	New York Rangers	
	Mike Zanier	Trail Smoke Eaters (WIHL)	
	Tom Gorence	Philadelphia Flyers	
	Reg Kerr	Chicago Black Hawks	
	Kari Jalonen	Calgary Flames	

=== Players lost ===
Date	Player	New team
September 7, 1983	Garry Unger	Retired

=== Waivers ===
Date	Player	Team
October 3, 1983	Don Nachbaur	to Los Angeles Kings

=== Signings ===
Date	Player	Term
September 7, 1983	Jeff Beukeboom	2-year
September 7, 1983	Kevin Lowe	4-year

== Draft picks ==
Edmonton's draft picks at the 1983 NHL entry draft

Round	#	Player	Nationality	College/Junior/Club team (League)
1	19	Jeff Beukeboom	Canada	Sault Ste. Marie Greyhounds (OHL)
2	40	Mike Golden	United States	Reading Senior High School (USHS-PA)
3	60	Mike Flanagan	United States	Acton-Boxborough High School (USHS-MA)
4	80	Esa Tikkanen	Finland	HIFK (SM-liiga)
6	120	Don Barber	Canada	Kelowna Buckaroos (BCJHL)
7	140	Dale Derkatch	Canada	Regina Pats (WHL)
8	160	Ralph Vos	Canada	Abbotsford Flyers (BCJHL)
9	180	Dave Roach	Canada	New Westminster Royals (BCJHL)
10	200	Warren Yadlowski	Canada	Calgary Wranglers (WHL)
11	220	John Miner	Canada	Regina Pats (WHL)
12	240	Steven Woodburn	Canada	Verdun Juniors (QMJHL)
