= 1983–84 Pittsburgh Penguins season =

NHL team season

1983–84 Pittsburgh Penguins
- Division: 6th Patrick
- Conference: 11th Wales
- 1983–84 record: 16–58–6
- Home record: 7–29–4
- Road record: 9–29–2
- Goals for: 254
- Goals against: 390

Team information
- General manager: Eddie Johnston
- Coach: Lou Angotti
- Captain: Randy Carlyle (Oct–Mar); Vacant (Mar–Apr)
- Alternate captains: None
- Arena: Pittsburgh Civic Arena

Team leaders
- Goals: Mike Bullard (51)
- Assists: Mike Bullard (41)
- Points: Mike Bullard (92)
- Penalty minutes: Gary Rissling (297)
- Wins: Denis Herron (8)
- Goals against average: Denis Herron (4.08)

The 1983–84 Pittsburgh Penguins season was the club's 17th season of operation in the National Hockey League (NHL). The Penguins placed sixth in their division and last in the NHL for the second year in a row for the first time in franchise history and did not qualify for the playoffs for the second year in a row for the first time since the 1972–73 season and the 1973–74 season.

== Offseason ==
Eddie Johnston, who had been the interim general manager, was awarded the GM title in June. He named Lou Angotti to take over the coaching duties.

A controversy surrounding the end of the 1983–84 season was the apparent throwing of games by the Pittsburgh Penguins in order to secure Mario Lemieux as a draft pick. Angotti admitted the team deliberately tanked the season, though Johnston denied the claims.

== Regular season ==
=== Final standings ===
Patrick Division
	GP	W	L	T	GF	GA	Pts
**New York Islanders**	80	50	26	4	357	269	104
**Washington Capitals**	80	48	27	5	308	226	101
**Philadelphia Flyers**	80	44	26	10	350	290	98
**New York Rangers**	80	42	29	9	314	304	93
New Jersey Devils	80	17	56	7	231	350	41
Pittsburgh Penguins	80	16	58	6	254	390	38

Note: GP = Games played, W = Wins, L = Losses, T = Ties, Pts = Points, GF = Goals for, GA = Goals against
Note: Teams that qualified for the playoffs are highlighted in bold.

=== Record vs. opponents ===
Patrick Division record vs. opponents

==== Vs. Wales Conference ====
**Vs. Patrick Division**

1983–84 NHL records
Team	**NJD**	**NYI**	**NYR**	**PHI**	**PIT**	**WSH**	**Total**
New Jersey	—	0−7	1−5−1	0−7	3−4	0−5−2	4−28−3
N.Y. Islanders	7−0	—	3−4	4−3	6−1	4−3	24−11−0
N.Y. Rangers	5−1−1	4−3	—	4−3	5−2	3−3−1	21−12−2
Philadelphia	7−0	3−4	3−4	—	7−0	3−4	23−12−0
Pittsburgh	4−3	1−6	2−5	0–7	—	1−6	8−27−0
Washington	5−0−2	3−4	3−3−1	4–3	6–1	—	21−11−3

**Vs. Adams Division**

1983–84 NHL records
Team	**BOS**	**BUF**	**HFD**	**MTL**	**QUE**	**Total**
New Jersey	1−2	0−2−1	1−1−1	1−2	1−2	4−9−2
N.Y. Islanders	0−2−1	3−0	1−2	3−0	1−2	8−6−1
N.Y. Rangers	0−2−1	1−1−1	1−2	1−2	2−0−1	5−7−3
Philadelphia	1−1−1	0−3	1−2	2−0−1	2−0−1	6−6−3
Pittsburgh	0−3	0−3	2−1	0−2−1	0−3	2−12−1
Washington	1−2	0−2−1	2−1	3−0	1−2	7−7−1

==== Vs. Campbell Conference ====
**Vs. Norris Division**

1983–84 NHL records
Team	**CHI**	**DET**	**MIN**	**STL**	**TOR**	**Total**
New Jersey	2−1	2−1	1−2	0−3	0−3	5−10−0
N.Y. Islanders	3−0	1−2	2−0−1	1−1−1	2−1	9−4−2
N.Y. Rangers	2−1	3−0	1−1−1	2−1	1−2	9−5−1
Philadelphia	1−0−2	1−0−2	0−1−2	1−2	3−0	6−3−6
Pittsburgh	1−1−1	0−3	1−2	0−2−1	1−1−1	3−9−3
Washington	1−1−1	1−2	3−0	2−1	3−0	10−4−1

**Vs. Smythe Division**

1983–84 NHL records
Team	**CGY**	**EDM**	**LAK**	**VAN**	**WIN**	**Total**
New Jersey	0−2−1	0−2−1	2−1	1−2	1−2	4−9−2
N.Y. Islanders	0−3	3−0	2−0−1	3−0	1−2	9−5−1
N.Y. Rangers	2−1	1−2	1−0−2	1−1−1	2−1	7−5−3
Philadelphia	2−1	2−0−1	2−1	1−2	2−1	9−5−1
Pittsburgh	0−1−2	0−3	1−2	1−2	1−2	3−10−2
Washington	2−1	1−2	3−0	2−1	2−1	10−5−0

== Schedule and results ==
1983–84 regular season
October: 3–9–0 (home: 0–7–0; road: 3–2–0), 6 points

#	Date	Visitor	Score	Home	Location	Record	Points
1	Oct 4	Pittsburgh Penguins	3–5	St. Louis Blues	The Checkerdome	0–1–0	0
2	Oct 8	New York Rangers	6–1	Pittsburgh Penguins	Civic Arena	0–2–0	0
3	Oct 9	Pittsburgh Penguins	1–7	Philadelphia Flyers	The Spectrum	0–3–0	0
4	Oct 12	Winnipeg Jets	4–3 OT	Pittsburgh Penguins	Civic Arena	0–4–0	0
5	Oct 14	Pittsburgh Penguins	4–0	Washington Capitals	Capital Centre	1–4–0	2
6	Oct 15	Hartford Whalers	6–4	Pittsburgh Penguins	Civic Arena	1–5–0	2
7	Oct 18	Buffalo Sabres	3–1	Pittsburgh Penguins	Civic Arena	1–6–0	2
8	Oct 22	Boston Bruins	6–1	Pittsburgh Penguins	Civic Arena	1–7–0	2
9	Oct 25	Washington Capitals	1–0	Pittsburgh Penguins	Civic Arena	1–8–0	2
10	Oct 27	Pittsburgh Penguins	4–2	Chicago Black Hawks	Chicago Stadium	2–8–0	4
11	Oct 29	Philadelphia Flyers	3–1	Pittsburgh Penguins	Civic Arena	2–9–0	4
12	Oct 30	Pittsburgh Penguins	5–3	New Jersey Devils	Izod Center	3–9–0	6

November: 3–7–3 (home: 1–3–2; road: 2–4–1), 9 points

#	Date	Visitor	Score	Home	Location	Record	Points
13	Nov 2	Pittsburgh Penguins	6–3	Winnipeg Jets	Winnipeg Arena	4–9–0	8
14	Nov 3	Pittsburgh Penguins	3–3 OT	Calgary Flames	Scotiabank Saddledome	4–9–1	9
15	Nov 5	Pittsburgh Penguins	3–7	Edmonton Oilers	Northlands Coliseum	4–10–1	9
16	Nov 8	Calgary Flames	4–4 OT	Pittsburgh Penguins	Civic Arena	4–10–2	10
17	Nov 11	New York Islanders	6–5	Pittsburgh Penguins	Civic Arena	4–11–2	10
18	Nov 12	Pittsburgh Penguins	4–2	New York Islanders	Nassau Veterans Memorial Coliseum	5–11–2	12
19	Nov 16	Toronto Maple Leafs	3–2	Pittsburgh Penguins	Civic Arena	5–12–2	12
20	Nov 19	St. Louis Blues	4–4 OT	Pittsburgh Penguins	Civic Arena	5–12–3	13
21	Nov 20	Pittsburgh Penguins	4–5 OT	Philadelphia Flyers	The Spectrum	5–13–3	13
22	Nov 23	New Jersey Devils	1–4	Pittsburgh Penguins	Civic Arena	6–13–3	15
23	Nov 25	Pittsburgh Penguins	2–5	Detroit Red Wings	Joe Louis Arena	6–14–3	15
24	Nov 26	Detroit Red Wings	7–4	Pittsburgh Penguins	Civic Arena	6–15–3	15
25	Nov 29	Pittsburgh Penguins	4–6	Minnesota North Stars	Met Center	6–16–3	15

December: 3–8–2 (home: 2–4–1; road: 1–4–1), 8 points

#	Date	Visitor	Score	Home	Location	Record	Points
26	Dec 1	Minnesota North Stars	6–4	Pittsburgh Penguins	Civic Arena	6–17–3	15
27	Dec 3	Philadelphia Flyers	6–3	Pittsburgh Penguins	Civic Arena	6–18–3	15
28	Dec 6	Boston Bruins	5–3	Pittsburgh Penguins	Civic Arena	6–19–3	15
29	Dec 11	Montreal Canadiens	3–3 OT	Pittsburgh Penguins	Civic Arena	6–19–4	16
30	Dec 13	Hartford Whalers	2–3	Pittsburgh Penguins	Civic Arena	7–19–4	18
31	Dec 15	Pittsburgh Penguins	1–3	Montreal Canadiens	Montreal Forum	7–20–4	18
32	Dec 17	Los Angeles Kings	6–5	Pittsburgh Penguins	Civic Arena	7–21–4	18
33	Dec 18	Pittsburgh Penguins	3–3 OT	Toronto Maple Leafs	Maple Leaf Gardens	7–21–5	19
34	Dec 20	Pittsburgh Penguins	3–11	New York Islanders	Nassau Veterans Memorial Coliseum	7–22–5	19
35	Dec 21	Pittsburgh Penguins	1–6	New York Rangers	Madison Square Garden (IV)	7–23–5	19
36	Dec 23	Pittsburgh Penguins	6–5 OT	New Jersey Devils	Izod Center	8–23–5	21
37	Dec 26	New York Rangers	4–7	Pittsburgh Penguins	Civic Arena	9–23–5	23
38	Dec 31	Pittsburgh Penguins	0–2	St. Louis Blues	The Checkerdome	9–24–5	23

January: 1–11–0 (home: 0–5–0; road: 1–6–0), 2 points

#	Date	Visitor	Score	Home	Location	Record	Points
39	Jan 3	Philadelphia Flyers	7–5	Pittsburgh Penguins	Civic Arena	9–25–5	23
40	Jan 6	Pittsburgh Penguins	1–3	New Jersey Devils	Izod Center	9–26–5	23
41	Jan 7	New Jersey Devils	7–4	Pittsburgh Penguins	Civic Arena	9–27–5	23
42	Jan 10	Pittsburgh Penguins	1–7	Quebec Nordiques	Quebec Coliseum	9–28–5	23
43	Jan 14	Pittsburgh Penguins	3–7	Boston Bruins	Boston Garden	9–29–5	23
44	Jan 15	Pittsburgh Penguins	0–2	Chicago Black Hawks	Chicago Stadium	9–30–5	23
45	Jan 18	Winnipeg Jets	5–4 OT	Pittsburgh Penguins	Civic Arena	9–31–5	23
46	Jan 20	Pittsburgh Penguins	6–3	New York Rangers	Madison Square Garden (IV)	10–31–5	25
47	Jan 21	Washington Capitals	3–2	Pittsburgh Penguins	Civic Arena	10–32–5	25
48	Jan 25	New York Rangers	6–3	Pittsburgh Penguins	Civic Arena	10–33–5	25
49	Jan 28	Pittsburgh Penguins	2–5	Montreal Canadiens	Montreal Forum	10–34–5	25
50	Jan 29	Pittsburgh Penguins	3–7	Buffalo Sabres	Buffalo Memorial Auditorium	10–35–5	25

February: 3–10–1 (home: 2–4–1; road: 1–6–0), 7 points

#	Date	Visitor	Score	Home	Location	Record	Points
51	Feb 1	Minnesota North Stars	0–4	Pittsburgh Penguins	Civic Arena	11–35–5	27
52	Feb 4	Pittsburgh Penguins	5–6	New York Islanders	Nassau Veterans Memorial Coliseum	11–36–5	27
53	Feb 5	New York Islanders	5–4	Pittsburgh Penguins	Civic Arena	11–37–5	27
54	Feb 8	Buffalo Sabres	6–5 OT	Pittsburgh Penguins	Civic Arena	11–38–5	27
55	Feb 9	Pittsburgh Penguins	3–9	Detroit Red Wings	Joe Louis Arena	11–39–5	27
56	Feb 11	New Jersey Devils	2–3	Pittsburgh Penguins	Civic Arena	12–39–5	29
57	Feb 13	Pittsburgh Penguins	1–6	Quebec Nordiques	Quebec Coliseum	12–40–5	29
58	Feb 16	Pittsburgh Penguins	3–10	Calgary Flames	Scotiabank Saddledome	12–41–5	29
59	Feb 17	Pittsburgh Penguins	4–1	Vancouver Canucks	Pacific Coliseum	13–41–5	31
60	Feb 19	Pittsburgh Penguins	3–7	Edmonton Oilers	Northlands Coliseum	13–42–5	31
61	Feb 22	Edmonton Oilers	9–2	Pittsburgh Penguins	Civic Arena	13–43–5	31
62	Feb 25	Chicago Black Hawks	3–3 OT	Pittsburgh Penguins	Civic Arena	13–43–6	32
63	Feb 26	Pittsburgh Penguins	3–4 OT	New York Rangers	Madison Square Garden (IV)	13–44–6	32
64	Feb 29	Vancouver Canucks	9–5	Pittsburgh Penguins	Civic Arena	13–45–6	32

March: 3–12–0 (home: 2–5–0; road: 1–7–0), 6 points

#	Date	Visitor	Score	Home	Location	Record	Points
65	Mar 1	Pittsburgh Penguins	1–9	Washington Capitals	Capital Centre	13–46–6	32
66	Mar 3	Los Angeles Kings	3–4	Pittsburgh Penguins	Civic Arena	14–46–6	34
67	Mar 5	Washington Capitals	5–2	Pittsburgh Penguins	Civic Arena	14–47–6	34
68	Mar 6	Pittsburgh Penguins	5–6	New Jersey Devils	Izod Center	14–48–6	34
69	Mar 8	Quebec Nordiques	8–6	Pittsburgh Penguins	Civic Arena	14–49–6	34
70	Mar 11	New York Islanders	6–4	Pittsburgh Penguins	Civic Arena	14–50–6	34
71	Mar 13	Pittsburgh Penguins	3–4	Vancouver Canucks	Pacific Coliseum	14–51–6	34
72	Mar 14	Pittsburgh Penguins	6–7	Los Angeles Kings	The Forum	14–52–6	34
73	Mar 17	Pittsburgh Penguins	4–2	Hartford Whalers	XL Center	15–52–6	36
74	Mar 21	Toronto Maple Leafs	1–3	Pittsburgh Penguins	Civic Arena	16–52–6	38
75	Mar 22	Pittsburgh Penguins	4–13	Philadelphia Flyers	The Spectrum	16–53–6	38
76	Mar 24	Pittsburgh Penguins	0–6	Washington Capitals	Capital Centre	16–54–6	38
77	Mar 25	Washington Capitals	4–3	Pittsburgh Penguins	Civic Arena	16–55–6	38
78	Mar 28	Philadelphia Flyers	5–3	Pittsburgh Penguins	Civic Arena	16–56–6	38
79	Mar 29	Pittsburgh Penguins	4–6	New York Rangers	Madison Square Garden (IV)	16–57–6	38

April: 0–1–0 (home: 0–1–0; road: 0–0–0), 0 points

#	Date	Visitor	Score	Home	Location	Record	Points
80	Apr 1	New York Islanders	2–1	Pittsburgh Penguins	Civic Arena	16–58–6	38

Legend: Win (2 points) Loss (0 points) Tie (1 point)

== Player statistics ==
Skaters

Regular season
Player	GP	G	A	Pts	+/−	PIM
Mike Bullard	76	51	41	92	–33	57
Doug Shedden	67	22	35	57	–38	20
Mark Taylor^{†}	59	24	31	55	–20	24
Rick Kehoe	57	18	27	45	–20	8
Ron Flockhart^{†}	68	27	18	45	–19	40
Pat Boutette	73	14	26	40	–56	142
Andy Brickley	50	18	20	38	–7	9
Greg Hotham	76	5	25	30	–25	59
Tom Roulston^{†}	53	11	17	28	–31	8
Randy Carlyle^{‡}	50	3	23	26	–25	82
Bob Errey	65	9	13	22	–20	29
Kevin McCarthy^{†}	31	4	16	20	–32	52
Norm Schmidt	34	6	12	18	–1	12
Gary Rissling	47	4	13	17	–9	297
Bryan Maxwell^{†}	45	3	12	15	2	84
Tom O'Regan	51	4	10	14	–22	8
Marty McSorley	72	2	7	9	–39	224
Tom Thornbury	14	1	8	9	–19	16
Tim Hrynewich	25	4	5	9	–10	34
Warren Young	15	1	7	8	–2	19
Greg Fox^{†}	49	2	5	7	–42	66
Bob Gladney	13	1	5	6	–1	2
Rod Buskas	47	2	4	6	–18	60
Steve Gatzos	23	3	3	6	–9	15
Kevin McClelland^{‡}	24	2	4	6	–7	62
Ted Bulley	26	3	2	5	–14	12
Paul Gardner	16	0	5	5	–4	6
Dave Hannan	24	2	3	5	–2	33
Rocky Saganiuk	29	1	3	4	–12	37
Jim Hamilton	11	2	2	4	2	4
Rod Schutt	11	1	3	4	0	4
Darren Lowe	8	1	2	3	–5	0
André St. Laurent^{‡}	8	2	0	2	0	21
Mitch Lamoureux	8	1	1	2	–6	6
Tim Tookey	8	0	2	2	–2	2
Greg Tebbutt	24	0	2	2	–26	31
Dean DeFazio	22	0	2	2	–11	28
Phil Bourque	5	0	1	1	–2	12
Randy Boyd^{‡}	5	0	1	1	–2	6
Marc Chorney^{‡}	4	0	1	1	–4	8
Rich Sutter^{‡}	5	0	0	0	–2	0
Todd Charlesworth	10	0	0	0	–7	8
Troy Loney	13	0	0	0	–7	9
Grant Sasser	3	0	0	0	–2	0
Total		254	417	671	—	1,656

Goaltenders

Regular Season
Player	GP	TOI	W	L	T	GA	GAA	SA	SV%	SO
Denis Herron	38	2028:00	8	24	2	138	4.08	1200	0.885	1
Roberto Romano	18	1020:00	6	11	0	78	4.59	629	0.876	1
Michel Dion	30	1553:00	2	19	4	138	5.33	937	0.853	0
Vincent Tremblay	4	240:00	0	4	0	24	6.00	142	0.831	0
Total		4841:00	16	58	6	378	4.68	2908	0.870	2

^{†}Denotes player spent time with another team before joining the Penguins. Stats reflect time with the Penguins only.
^{‡}Denotes player was traded mid-season. Stats reflect time with the Penguins only.

== Awards and records ==
- Rick Kehoe established a new franchise record for points with 634. He topped the previous record of 603 held by Jean Pronovost.
- Pat Boutette established a new franchise record for lowest plus-minus with –56. He topped the previous record of –51 held by Paul Baxter.
- fewest wins in team history (16)
- fewest points in team history (38)

== Transactions ==
The Penguins were involved in the following transactions during the 1983–84 season:

=== Trades ===
August 15, 1983	To Toronto Maple Leafs Pat Graham; Nick Ricci	To Pittsburgh Penguins Rocky Saganiuk; Vincent Tremblay
September 9, 1983	To Los Angeles Kings Anders Hakansson	To Pittsburgh Penguins rights to Kevin Stevens
September 30, 1983	To Hartford Whalers Greg Malone	To Pittsburgh Penguins 1985 3rd round pick
October 15, 1983	To Los Angeles Kings Marc Chorney	To Pittsburgh Penguins 1985 6th round pick
October 23, 1983	To Philadelphia Flyers Rich Sutter; 1984 2nd round pick 1984 3rd round pick	To Pittsburgh Penguins Andy Brickley; Ron Flockhart; Mark Taylor; 1984 1st round pick 1984 3rd round pick
October 24, 1983	To Detroit Red Wings Andre St. Laurent	To Pittsburgh Penguins future considerations
December 5, 1983	To Edmonton Oilers Kevin McClelland; 1984 6th round pick	To Pittsburgh Penguins Tom Roulston
December 6, 1983	To Chicago Blackhawks Randy Boyd	To Pittsburgh Penguins Greg Fox
January 26, 1984	To Vancouver Canucks 1984 3rd round pick	To Pittsburgh Penguins Kevin McCarthy
March 5, 1984	To Winnipeg Jets Randy Carlyle	To Pittsburgh Penguins 1984 1st round pick future considerations (Moe Mantha)

=== Additions and subtractions ===
Additions
Player	Former team	Via
Greg Tebbutt	Quebec Nordiques	free agency (1983-07-22)
Warren Young	Minnesota North Stars	free agency (1983-08-12)
Tom O'Regan	Boston University Terriers (ECAC)	free agency (1983-09-04)
Bob Gladney	Los Angeles Kings	free agency (1983-09-12)
Tim Tookey	Quebec Nordiques	free agency (1983-09-12)
Ted Bulley	Washington Capitals	free agency (1983-09-30)
Bryan Maxwell	Winnipeg Jets	waivers (1983-10-13)

Subtractions
Player	New team	Via
Peter Lee	Düsseldorfer EG	free agency
Paul Baxter	Calgary Flames	free agency (1983-09-29)
Rick MacLeish	Philadelphia Flyers	free agency (1983-10-06)

== Draft picks ==
The 1983 NHL entry draft was held on June 8, 1983, in Montreal.

Round	#	Player	Pos	Nationality	College/Junior/Club team (League)
1	15	Bob Errey	Left wing	Canada	Peterborough Petes (OHL)
2	22	Todd Charlesworth	Defense	Canada	Oshawa Generals (OHL)
3	58	Mike Rowe	Defense	Canada	Toronto Marlboros (OHL)
4	63	Frank Pietrangelo	Goaltender	Canada	U. of Minnesota (NCAA)
6	103	Patrick Emond	Center	Canada	Hull Olympiques (QMJHL)
7	123	Paul Ames	Defense	United States	Billerica H.S. (Massachusetts)
9	163	Marty Ketola	Right wing	United States	Cloquet H.S. (Minn.)
10	183	Alec Haidy	Right wing	Canada	Sault Ste. Marie Greyhounds (OHL)
11	203	Garth Hildebrand	Left wing	Canada	Calgary Wranglers (WHL)
12	223	Dave Goertz	Defense	Canada	Regina Pats (WHL)

== See also ==
- 1983–84 NHL season
