= Normand Baron =

Canadian ice hockey player

- Born: December 15, 1957 (age 67); Verdun, Quebec, Canada
- Height: 6 ft 0 in (183 cm)
- Weight: 205 lb (93 kg; 14 st 9 lb)
- Position: Left wing
- Shot: Left
- Played for: Montreal Canadiens; St. Louis Blues
- NHL draft: Undrafted
- Playing career: 1983–1986

Joseph Jean Louis Normand Baron (born December 15, 1957) is a Canadian retired ice hockey player who played 27 games in the National Hockey League with the Montreal Canadiens and St. Louis Blues between 1984 and 1986. He was also, for a time, a professional bodybuilder.

Born in Verdun, Quebec, Baron had played junior hockey with the Montreal Jr. Canadiens in 1976–77 and then quit to pursue a career in bodybuilding. In 1983, he made a comeback, and the Canadiens signed him to a contract. He was later acquired by the St. Louis Blues, in exchange for cash, but only played in 23 games before being sent to the minors. Baron retired at season's end.

== Career statistics ==
=== Regular season and playoffs ===
			Regular season					Playoffs
Season	Team	League	GP	G	A	Pts	PIM	GP	G	A	Pts	PIM
1976–77	Montreal Juniors	QMJHL	7	1	1	2	0	—	—	—	—	—
1983–84	Nova Scotia Voyageurs	AHL	68	11	11	22	275	—	—	—	—	—
1983–84	Montreal Canadiens	NHL	4	0	0	0	12	3	0	0	0	22
1984–85	Sherbrooke Canadiens	AHL	39	5	5	10	98	2	0	0	0	25
1985–86	Peoria Rivermen	IHL	17	4	4	8	61	—	—	—	—	—
1985–86	Flint Spirits	IHL	11	1	7	8	43	—	—	—	—	—
1985–86	St. Louis Blues	NHL	23	2	0	2	39	—	—	—	—	—
NHL totals			27	2	0	2	51	3	0	0	0	22
