= Daryl Stanley =

Canadian ice hockey player

- Born: December 2, 1962 (age 63) Winnipeg, Manitoba, Canada
- Height: 6 ft 3 in (191 cm)
- Weight: 210 lb (95 kg; 15 st 0 lb)
- Position: Defence/Left wing
- Shot: Left
- Played for: Philadelphia Flyers; Vancouver Canucks
- NHL draft: Undrafted
- Playing career: 1982–1990

Daryl Stanley (born December 2, 1962) is a Canadian former professional ice hockey player who spent parts of eight seasons in the National Hockey League (NHL) with the Philadelphia Flyers and Vancouver Canucks from 1983 until 1990. He also spent several seasons in the minor leagues, mainly playing in the American Hockey League.

== Playing career ==
Stanley was signed as an undrafted free agent by the Philadelphia Flyers in 1981. After closing out his junior career with the Saskatoon Blades, he turned pro in 1982. After two solid seasons in the minors, he made his NHL debut in 1983–84, appearing in 23 games down the stretch for the Flyers (and scoring his first NHL goal) along with all three of the team's playoff games. However, his career would undergo a setback the following season, as he suffered career-threatening injuries in a car accident while playing for the Hershey Bears, Philadelphia's American Hockey League affiliate, and missed most of the year.

However, Stanley would battle back, and established himself as a full-time member of the Flyers after being called up again midway through the 1985–86 season. Blessed with limited natural talent, Stanley was able to stick in the NHL as a useful utility player primarily due to his size and grit, along with his versatility. While his natural position was on the blueline, he would see much of his NHL action as a forward where his size and toughness allowed him to serve as an enforcer. He appeared in 33 games for the Flyers in 1986–87, and dressed in 13 playoff games as Philadelphia reached the Stanley Cup Finals before losing to the Edmonton Oilers.

For the 1987–88 season, Stanley was dealt to the Vancouver Canucks. In Vancouver, he received a chance to play more regularly, and responded with his best NHL season, recording 2 goals and 9 points in 57 games along with 151 penalty minutes. He would set a career high with 3 goals in 1988–89, although injuries limited him to just 20 games. After seeing action in just 23 games in the 1989–90 campaign, he retired.

Stanley finished his NHL career with 8 goals and 17 assists for 25 points in 189 games, along with 408 penalty minutes.

Following his retirement, Stanley would become a hunting guide, specializing in ducks and waterfowl, and he currently operates a hunting lodge outside of Winnipeg, Manitoba. His middle son Matthew plays for the Lethbridge Hurricanes of the Western Hockey League (WHL).

== Career statistics ==
=== Regular season and playoffs ===
			Regular season					Playoffs
Season	Team	League	GP	G	A	Pts	PIM	GP	G	A	Pts	PIM
1978–79	Revelstoke Bruins	BCJHL	46	12	11	23	117	—	—	—	—	—
1979–80	New Westminster Bruins	WHL	64	2	12	14	110	—	—	—	—	—
1980–81	New Westminster Bruins	WHL	66	7	27	34	127	—	—	—	—	—
1981–82	Saskatoon Blades	WHL	65	7	25	32	175	5	1	1	2	14
1981–82	Maine Mariners	AHL	—	—	—	—	—	2	0	2	8	2
1982–83	Maine Mariners	AHL	44	2	5	7	95	2	0	0	0	0
1982–83	Toledo Goaldiggers	IHL	5	0	2	2	2	—	—	—	—	—
1983–84	Philadelphia Flyers	NHL	23	1	4	5	71	3	0	0	0	19
1983–84	Springfield Indians	AHL	51	4	10	14	122	—	—	—	—	—
1984–85	Hershey Bears	AHL	24	0	7	7	33	—	—	—	—	—
1985–86	Philadelphia Flyers	NHL	33	0	2	2	69	1	0	0	0	2
1985–86	Hershey Bears	AHL	27	0	4	4	88	—	—	—	—	—
1986–87	Philadelphia Flyers	NHL	33	1	2	3	76	13	0	0	0	9
1987–88	Vancouver Canucks	NHL	57	2	7	9	151	—	—	—	—	—
1988–89	Vancouver Canucks	NHL	20	3	1	4	14	—	—	—	—	—
1989–90	Vancouver Canucks	NHL	23	1	1	2	27	—	—	—	—	—
AHL totals			146	6	26	32	338	4	0	2	2	2
NHL totals			189	8	17	25	408	17	0	0	0	30
