= 1983–84 New York Rangers season =

NHL hockey team season

1983–84 New York Rangers
- Division: 4th Patrick
- Conference: 7th Wales
- 1983–84 record: 42–29–9
- Home record: 27–12–1
- Road record: 15–17–8
- Goals for: 314
- Goals against: 304

Team information
- General manager: Craig Patrick
- Coach: Herb Brooks
- Captain: Barry Beck
- Alternate captains: None
- Arena: Madison Square Garden

Team leaders
- Goals: Pierre Larouche (48)
- Assists: Mark Pavelich (53)
- Points: Mark Pavelich (82)
- Penalty minutes: Dave Maloney (168)
- Wins: Glen Hanlon (28)
- Goals against average: John Vanbiesbrouck (3.33)

The 1983–84 New York Rangers season was the franchise's 58th season. The Rangers posted a 42–29–9 record in the regular season, and their fourth-place finish in the Patrick Division earned them a berth in the NHL playoffs. In the Patrick Division semi-finals, the Rangers lost to the New York Islanders, three games to two.

== Regular season ==
=== Final standings ===
Patrick Division
	GP	W	L	T	GF	GA	Pts
**New York Islanders**	80	50	26	4	357	269	104
**Washington Capitals**	80	48	27	5	308	226	101
**Philadelphia Flyers**	80	44	26	10	350	290	98
**New York Rangers**	80	42	29	9	314	304	93
New Jersey Devils	80	17	56	7	231	350	41
Pittsburgh Penguins	80	16	58	6	254	390	38

Note: GP = Games played, W = Wins, L = Losses, T = Ties, Pts = Points, GF = Goals for, GA = Goals against
Note: Teams that qualified for the playoffs are highlighted in bold.

=== Record vs. opponents ===
Patrick Division record vs. opponents

==== Vs. Wales Conference ====
**Vs. Patrick Division**

1983–84 NHL records
Team	**NJD**	**NYI**	**NYR**	**PHI**	**PIT**	**WSH**	**Total**
New Jersey	—	0−7	1−5−1	0−7	3−4	0−5−2	4−28−3
N.Y. Islanders	7−0	—	3−4	4−3	6−1	4−3	24−11−0
N.Y. Rangers	5−1−1	4−3	—	4−3	5−2	3−3−1	21−12−2
Philadelphia	7−0	3−4	3−4	—	7−0	3−4	23−12−0
Pittsburgh	4−3	1−6	2−5	0–7	—	1−6	8−27−0
Washington	5−0−2	3−4	3−3−1	4–3	6–1	—	21−11−3

**Vs. Adams Division**

1983–84 NHL records
Team	**BOS**	**BUF**	**HFD**	**MTL**	**QUE**	**Total**
New Jersey	1−2	0−2−1	1−1−1	1−2	1−2	4−9−2
N.Y. Islanders	0−2−1	3−0	1−2	3−0	1−2	8−6−1
N.Y. Rangers	0−2−1	1−1−1	1−2	1−2	2−0−1	5−7−3
Philadelphia	1−1−1	0−3	1−2	2−0−1	2−0−1	6−6−3
Pittsburgh	0−3	0−3	2−1	0−2−1	0−3	2−12−1
Washington	1−2	0−2−1	2−1	3−0	1−2	7−7−1

==== Vs. Campbell Conference ====
**Vs. Norris Division**

1983–84 NHL records
Team	**CHI**	**DET**	**MIN**	**STL**	**TOR**	**Total**
New Jersey	2−1	2−1	1−2	0−3	0−3	5−10−0
N.Y. Islanders	3−0	1−2	2−0−1	1−1−1	2−1	9−4−2
N.Y. Rangers	2−1	3−0	1−1−1	2−1	1−2	9−5−1
Philadelphia	1−0−2	1−0−2	0−1−2	1−2	3−0	6−3−6
Pittsburgh	1−1−1	0−3	1−2	0−2−1	1−1−1	3−9−3
Washington	1−1−1	1−2	3−0	2−1	3−0	10−4−1

**Vs. Smythe Division**

1983–84 NHL records
Team	**CGY**	**EDM**	**LAK**	**VAN**	**WIN**	**Total**
New Jersey	0−2−1	0−2−1	2−1	1−2	1−2	4−9−2
N.Y. Islanders	0−3	3−0	2−0−1	3−0	1−2	9−5−1
N.Y. Rangers	2−1	1−2	1−0−2	1−1−1	2−1	7−5−3
Philadelphia	2−1	2−0−1	2−1	1−2	2−1	9−5−1
Pittsburgh	0−1−2	0−3	1−2	1−2	1−2	3−10−2
Washington	2−1	1−2	3−0	2−1	2−1	10−5−0

== Schedule and results ==
1983–84 regular season
October: 9–4–0 (home: 6–3–0; road: 3–1–0)

Game	October	Opponent	Score	Record
1	5	New Jersey Devils	6 – 2	1–0–0
2	7	@ New Jersey Devils	3 – 1	2–0–0
3	8	@ Pittsburgh Penguins	6 – 1	3–0–0
4	10	Los Angeles Kings	2 – 1	4–0–0
5	13	Washington Capitals	4 – 3	5–0–0
6	15	@ St. Louis Blues	6 – 5	5–1–0
7	16	Philadelphia Flyers	5 – 4	6–1–0
8	19	Calgary Flames	3 – 1	7–1–0
9	22	@ New York Islanders	3 – 2	8–1–0
10	23	New York Islanders	6 – 5 OT	9–1–0
11	26	Winnipeg Jets	7 – 5	9–2–0
12	28	Toronto Maple Leafs	5 – 3	9–3–0
13	30	Edmonton Oilers	5 – 4 OT	9–4–0

November: 5–5–4 (home: 4–2–1; road: 1–3–3)

Game	November	Opponent	Score	Record
14	2	@ Buffalo Sabres	3 – 3 OT	9–4–1
15	5	@ Quebec Nordiques	4 – 4 OT	9–4–2
16	8	@ New Jersey Devils	5 – 1	10–4–2
17	9	Calgary Flames	4 – 3	11–4–2
18	12	@ Washington Capitals	7 – 4	11–5–2
19	13	Detroit Red Wings	6 – 3	12–5–2
20	16	Washington Capitals	4 – 1	13–5–2
21	19	@ Boston Bruins	6 – 6 OT	13–5–3
22	20	Quebec Nordiques	6 – 5 OT	14–5–3
23	23	Buffalo Sabres	6 – 4	14–6–3
24	25	@ Washington Capitals	3 – 1	14–7–3
25	26	@ Hartford Whalers	4 – 3 OT	14–8–3
26	28	Vancouver Canucks	3 – 3 OT	14–8–4
27	30	Chicago Black Hawks	4 – 0	14–9–4

December: 8–4–0 (home: 5–2–0; road: 3–2–0)

Game	December	Opponent	Score	Record
28	3	@ Detroit Red Wings	4 – 2	15–9–4
29	4	Minnesota North Stars	6 – 4	16–9–4
30	7	Washington Capitals	7 – 5	17–9–4
31	12	New Jersey Devils	7 – 3	17–10–4
32	14	Edmonton Oilers	9 – 4	17–11–4
33	17	@ New York Islanders	7 – 1	17–12–4
34	21	Pittsburgh Penguins	6 – 1	18–12–4
35	23	Chicago Black Hawks	3 – 2	19–12–4
36	26	@ Pittsburgh Penguins	7 – 4	19–13–4
37	28	@ Chicago Black Hawks	7 – 4	20–13–4
38	30	Philadelphia Flyers	6 – 3	21–13–4
39	31	@ Buffalo Sabres	3 – 2	22–13–4

January: 8–4–1 (home: 5–2–0; road: 3–2–1)

Game	January	Opponent	Score	Record
40	2	@ Washington Capitals	2 – 2 OT	22–13–5
41	4	New Jersey Devils	4 – 3 OT	23–13–5
42	7	@ Boston Bruins	5 – 2	23–14–5
43	8	New York Islanders	5 – 4	24–14–5
44	12	@ Philadelphia Flyers	2 – 1	25–14–5
45	14	@ New York Islanders	4 – 2	25–15–5
46	16	Detroit Red Wings	8 – 5	26–15–5
47	18	St. Louis Blues	6 – 2	27–15–5
48	20	Pittsburgh Penguins	6 – 3	27–16–5
49	21	@ Toronto Maple Leafs	6 – 3	28–16–5
50	25	@ Pittsburgh Penguins	6 – 3	29–16–5
51	26	Montreal Canadiens	4 – 2	29–17–5
52	29	St. Louis Blues	3 – 2	30–17–5

February: 5–5–4 (home: 3–1–0; road: 2–4–4)

Game	February	Opponent	Score	Record
53	2	@ Calgary Flames	8 – 1	30–18–5
54	4	@ Vancouver Canucks	5 – 4	31–18–5
55	5	@ Los Angeles Kings	3 – 3 OT	31–18–6
56	8	@ Winnipeg Jets	3 – 1	32–18–6
57	9	@ Minnesota North Stars	4 – 4 OT	32–18–7
58	11	@ Los Angeles Kings	6 – 6 OT	32–18–8
59	15	New York Islanders	3 – 2	33–18–8
60	18	@ New York Islanders	4 – 3	33–19–8
61	19	Philadelphia Flyers	3 – 2 OT	33–20–8
62	23	Quebec Nordiques	4 – 2	34–20–8
63	25	@ Montreal Canadiens	7 – 4	34–21–8
64	26	Pittsburgh Penguins	4 – 3 OT	35–21–8
65	28	@ New Jersey Devils	3 – 3 OT	35–21–9
66	29	@ Toronto Maple Leafs	3 – 1	35–22–9

March: 6–7–0 (home: 3–2–0; road: 3–5–0)

Game	March	Opponent	Score	Record
67	3	@ Washington Capitals	5 – 1	35–23–9
68	4	Vancouver Canucks	5 – 4	35–24–9
69	7	@ Minnesota North Stars	6 – 3	35–25–9
70	9	@ Winnipeg Jets	6 – 5 OT	36–25–9
71	10	@ Edmonton Oilers	3 – 2	37–25–9
72	14	Philadelphia Flyers	6 – 3	38–25–9
73	17	@ Philadelphia Flyers	6 – 4	38–26–9
74	20	Boston Bruins	6 – 4	38–27–9
75	22	@ New Jersey Devils	5 – 3	39–27–9
76	24	@ Philadelphia Flyers	6 – 5	39–28–9
77	25	Montreal Canadiens	3 – 2	40–28–9
78	29	Pittsburgh Penguins	6 – 4	41–28–9
79	31	@ Hartford Whalers	5 – 3	41–29–9

April: 1–0–0 (home: 1–0–0; road: 0–0–0)

Game	April	Opponent	Score	Record
80	1	Hartford Whalers	2 – 0	42–29–9

Legend: Win (2 points) Loss (0 points) Tie (1 point)

== Playoffs ==
1984 Stanley Cup playoffs
Division semifinals vs. (P1) New York Islanders – Islanders win 3–2

Game	Date	Visitor	Score	Home	OT	Series
1	April 4	New York Rangers	1 – 4	New York Islanders		New York Islanders lead series 1-0
2	April 5	New York Rangers	3 – 0	New York Islanders		Series tied 1-1
3	April 7	New York Islanders	2 – 7	New York Rangers		New York Rangers lead series 2-1
4	April 8	New York Islanders	4 – 1	New York Rangers		Series tied 2-2
5	April 10	New York Rangers	2 – 3	New York Islanders	OT	New York Islanders win series 3-2

Legend: Win Loss

== Player statistics ==
Skaters

Regular season
Player	GP	G	A	Pts	+/-	PIM
Mark Pavelich	77	29	53	82	11	96
Pierre Larouche	77	48	33	81	-15	22
Anders Hedberg	79	32	35	67	18	16
Don Maloney	79	24	42	66	-5	62
Mike Rogers	78	23	38	61	-24	45
Reijo Ruotsalainen	74	20	39	59	17	26
Ron Greschner	77	12	44	56	5	117
Mark Osborne	73	23	28	51	1	88
Peter Sundstrom	77	22	22	44	3	24
Barry Beck	72	9	27	36	12	134
Dave Maloney	68	7	26	33	11	168
Jan Erixon	75	5	25	30	14	16
Mikko Leinonen	28	3	23	26	4	28
Willie Huber	42	9	14	23	-14	60
Mike Allison	45	8	12	20	5	64
Kent-Erik Andersson	63	5	15	20	5	8
Tom Laidlaw	79	3	15	18	-10	62
Rob McClanahan	41	6	8	14	0	21
Nick Fotiu	40	7	6	13	8	115
Mike Blaisdell	36	5	6	11	0	31
James Patrick	12	1	7	8	6	2
Blaine Stoughton^{†}	14	5	2	7	-12	4
Steve Richmond	26	2	5	7	6	110
Robbie Ftorek	31	3	2	5	2	22
Larry Patey^{†}	9	1	2	3	0	4
Bob Brooke	9	1	2	3	1	4
George McPhee	9	1	1	2	0	11
Scot Kleinendorst	23	0	2	2	-10	35
Chris Kontos	6	0	1	1	0	8
Mike Backman	8	0	1	1	-1	8
Mark Morrison	1	0	0	0	0	0
Rick Chartraw^{‡}	4	0	0	0	-3	4
Dave Barr^{‡}	6	0	0	0	0	2

Playoffs
Player	GP	G	A	Pts	PIM
Mark Pavelich	5	2	4	6	0
Don Maloney	5	1	4	5	0
Peter Sundstrom	5	1	3	4	0
Pierre Larouche	5	3	1	4	2
James Patrick	5	0	3	3	2
Willie Huber	4	1	1	2	9
Mikko Leinonen	5	0	2	2	4
Jan Erixon	5	2	0	2	4
Reijo Ruotsalainen	5	1	1	2	2
Larry Patey	4	0	1	1	6
Kent-Erik Andersson	5	0	1	1	0
Mike Allison	5	0	1	1	6
Barry Beck	4	1	0	1	6
Mark Osborne	5	0	1	1	7
Ron Greschner	2	1	0	1	2
Anders Hedberg	5	1	0	1	0
Bob Brooke	5	0	0	0	7
Steve Richmond	4	0	0	0	12
Tom Laidlaw	5	0	0	0	8
Dave Maloney	1	0	0	0	2
Mike Rogers	1	0	0	0	0

Goaltenders

Regular season
Player	GP	TOI	W	L	T	GA	GAA	SA	SV%	SO
Glen Hanlon	50	2837	28	14	4	166	3.51	1674	.890	1
Steve Weeks	26	1361	10	11	2	90	3.97	757	.865	0
Ron Scott	9	485	2	3	3	29	3.59	283	.886	0
John Vanbiesbrouck	3	180	2	1	0	10	3.33	95	.882	0

Playoffs
Player	GP	TOI	W	L	GA	GAA	SA	SV%	SO
Glen Hanlon	5	308	2	3	13	2.53	166	.922	1
John Vanbiesbrouck	1	1	0	0	0	0.00	0	–	0

^{†}Denotes player spent time with another team before joining Rangers. Stats reflect time with Rangers only.
^{‡}Traded mid-season. Stats reflect time with Rangers only.

Note:

Pos = Position;GP = Games played; G = Goals; A = Assists; Pts = Points; PIM = Penalty minutes; +/- = Plus/minus; PPG = Power-play goals; SHG = Short-handed goals; GWG = Game-winning goals
Pos = Position;GP = Games played; Min, TOI = Minutes played; W = Wins; L = Losses; T,T/OT = Ties; OTL = Overtime losses; GA = Goals-against; GAA = Goals-against average; SO = Shutouts; SA = Shots against; SV = Shots saved;SV% = Save percentage;

== Draft picks ==
New York's picks at the 1983 NHL entry draft in Montreal, Canada at the Montreal Forum.

Round	#	Player	Position	Nationality	College/Junior/Club team (League)
1	12	Dave Gagner	C	Canada	Brantford Alexanders (OHL)
2	33	Randy Heath	LW	Canada	Portland Winter Hawks (WHL)
3	49	Vesa Salo	D	Finland	Lukko Rauma (FNL)
3	53	Gordie Walker	LW	Canada	Portland Winter Hawks (WHL)
4	73	Peter Andersson	D	Sweden	Orebro IK (Sweden)
5	93	Jim Andonoff	RW	United States	Belleville Bulls (OHL)
6	113	Bob Alexander	D	United States	Rosemount H.S. (Minnesota)
7	133	Steve Orth	C	United States	St. Cloud Tech H.S. (Minnesota)
8	153	Pete Marcov	LW	Canada	Welland (Ontario Jr. B)
9	173	Paul Jerrard	RW	Canada	Notre Dame Academy (Sask. AAA)
11	213	Bryan Walker	D	Canada	Portland Winter Hawks (WHL)
12	233	Ulf Nilsson	G	Sweden	Skelleftea (FNL)
