= 36th National Hockey League All-Star Game =

Professional ice hockey exhibition game

36th NHL All-Star Game
	1	2	3	Total
Wales	5	1	1	7
Campbell	0	3	3	6
- Date: January 31, 1984
- Arena: Brendan Byrne Arena
- City: East Rutherford
- MVP: Don Maloney (NY Rangers)
- Attendance: 18,939

The 36th National Hockey League All-Star Game was held in Brendan Byrne Arena in East Rutherford, home to the New Jersey Devils, on January 31, 1984.

== Uniforms ==
The All-Star uniforms introduced in 1983 received an update for this game. The typeface for the diagonal "Wales" and "Campbell" conference names on the front of the jerseys changed from a plain block font to the style used by the New York Rangers. Trim stripes were added to the shoulder/sleeve panels and waistline - black on the white Wales jersey, and white on the orange Campbell jersey. This design would continue to be used through 1986.

== Team lineups ==
=== Wales Conference All-Stars ===
Wales Conference roster
#	Nat.	Name	Pos.	Team
Goaltenders
1	(Canada)	Pete Peeters		Boston Bruins
30	(United States) (Canada)	Glenn Resch		New Jersey Devils
Defencemen
2	(Canada)	Joe Cirella		New Jersey Devils
4	(United States)	Rod Langway		Washington Capitals
5	(Canada)	Denis Potvin, captain		New York Islanders
6	(United States)	Phil Housley		Buffalo Sabres
7	(Canada)	Raymond Bourque		Boston Bruins
20	(United States)	Mike O'Connell		Boston Bruins
Forwards
10	(Canada)	Barry Pederson	C	Boston Bruins
11	(Canada)	Gilbert Perreault	C	Buffalo Sabres
12	(Canada)	Don Maloney	LW	New York Rangers
14	(United States)	Mark Johnson	LW	Hartford Whalers
15	(Canada)	Michel Goulet	LW	Quebec Nordiques
16	(Canada)	Rick Middleton	RW	Boston Bruins
17	(Canada)	Tim Kerr	C	Philadelphia Flyers
23	(Canada)	Mike Bullard	C	Pittsburgh Penguins
25	(Sweden)	Mats Naslund	LW	Montreal Canadiens
26	(Canada)	Brian Propp	LW	Philadelphia Flyers
27	(Czechoslovakia)	Peter Stastny	C	Quebec Nordiques
28	(Canada)	Pierre Larouche	C	New York Rangers
Head coach
—	(Canada)	Al Arbour	—	New York Islanders

=== Campbell Conference All-Stars ===
Campbell Conference roster
#	Nat.	Name	Pos.	Team
Goaltenders
30	(Canada)	Murray Bannerman		Chicago Black Hawks
31	(Canada)	Grant Fuhr		Edmonton Oilers
Defencemen
4	(Canada)	Kevin Lowe		Edmonton Oilers
5	(Canada)	Rob Ramage		St. Louis Blues
6	(Canada)	Brad Maxwell		Minnesota North Stars
7	(Canada)	Paul Coffey		Edmonton Oilers
24	(Canada)	Doug Wilson		Chicago Black Hawks
44	(Canada)	Dave Babych		Winnipeg Jets
Forwards
8	(Canada)	Glenn Anderson	RW	Edmonton Oilers
9	(Canada)	Lanny McDonald	RW	Calgary Flames
10	(Canada)	Charlie Simmer	LW	Los Angeles Kings
11	(Canada)	Mark Messier	LW	Edmonton Oilers
12	(Canada)	Bernie Nicholls	C	Los Angeles Kings
17	(Canada)	Darcy Rota	LW	Vancouver Canucks
18	(Canada)	Denis Savard	C	Chicago Black Hawks
19	(Canada)	Steve Yzerman	C	Detroit Red Wings
22	(Canada)	Rick Vaive	RW	Toronto Maple Leafs
23	(Canada)	Brian Bellows	RW	Minnesota North Stars
25	(Canada)	John Ogrodnick	RW	Detroit Red Wings
99	(Canada)	Wayne Gretzky, captain	C	Edmonton Oilers
Head coach
—	(Canada)	Glen Sather	—	Edmonton Oilers

G = Goaltenders; D = Defencemen; C = Center; LW/RW = Left/right wing

== Game summary ==
#	Score	Team	Goals (Assist(s))	Time
First period
1	1-0	Wales	Cirella (Stastny)	8:51
2	2-0	Wales	Potvin (Kerr – Goulet)	9:30
3	3-0	Wales	Middleton (Pederson – Housley)	14:49
4	4-0	Wales	Naslund (Maloney – Potvin)	16:40
5	5-0	Wales	Larouche (Johnson – Maloney)	17:14
Second period
6	5-1	Campbell	Savard (Vaive – Rota)	1:23
7	5-2	Campbell	Rota (Vaive – Savard)	5:51
8	5-3	Campbell	Ogrodnick (Yzerman)	6:42
9	6-3	Wales	Larouche (Maloney – Johnson)	17:34
Third period
10	7-3	Wales	Maloney (Johnson – Cirella)	7:24
11	7-4	Campbell	Babych (Ogrodnick)	8:11
12	7-5	Campbell	Gretzky (Vaive – Simmer)	11:23
13	7-6	Campbell	Bellows (Wilson)	17:37

Shots: Campbell 13-15-10 (38) Wales 13-11-6 (30)

- Referee: Bruce Hood
- Linesmen: John D'Amico, Ray Scapinello
- TV: CBC, SRC, USA Network

== See also ==
- 1983–84 NHL season
