= 1984–85 Hartford Whalers season =

National Hockey League team season

1984–85 Hartford Whalers
- Division: 5th Adams
- Conference: 8th Wales
- 1984–85 record: 30–41–9
- Home record: 17–18–5
- Road record: 13–23–4
- Goals for: 288
- Goals against: 320

Team information
- General manager: Emile Francis
- Coach: Jack Evans
- Captain: Mark Johnson
- Arena: Hartford Civic Center
- Average attendance: 12,059 (81.4%)
- Minor league affiliates: Binghamton Whalers (AHL); Salt Lake Golden Eagles (IHL)

Team leaders
- Goals: Sylvain Turgeon (31)
- Assists: Ron Francis (57)
- Points: Ron Francis (81)
- Penalty minutes: Torrie Robertson (337)
- Plus/minus: Paul Fenton (+7)
- Wins: Greg Millen (16)
- Goals against average: Mike Liut (2.97)

The 1984–85 Hartford Whalers season was the Whalers' sixth season in the National Hockey League (NHL). The Whalers failed to qualify for the post-season for the fifth consecutive season. The Whalers finished with a 30–41–9 record, earning 69 points, which was their highest point total since the 1979–80 season. Hartford finished 13 points behind the fourth place Boston Bruins for the final playoff position in the Adams Division.

== Offseason ==
On May 29, the Whalers acquired defenseman Brad Shaw from the Detroit Red Wings for an eighth round draft pick in the 1984 NHL entry draft. Shaw played with the Ottawa 67's during the 1983–84 season, scoring 12 goals and 78 points in 63 games. Shaw also participated with Canada at the 1984 World Junior Ice Hockey Championships, where he had two assists in seven games. Shaw was a fifth round draft pick for Detroit at the 1982 NHL entry draft.

On June 9, Hartford selected defenseman Sylvain Cote in the first round, 11th overall pick, at the 1984 NHL entry draft held at the Montreal Forum. Cote scored 15 goals and 65 points with the Quebec Remparts of the QMJHL. He also represented Canada at the 1984 World Junior Ice Hockey Championships, where he earned two assists in seven games.

Two days later, on June 11, the Whalers signed head coach Jack Evans and assistant coach Claude Larose to a three-year extension, through the 1987–88 season. In his first season with Hartford in 1983–84, Evans led the club to a 28–42–10 record, earning 70 points, which represented a 25-point improvement over the 1982–83 season.

On September 5, the club acquired goaltender Steve Weeks from the New York Rangers for future considerations. Weeks had a 10–11–2 record with a 3.98 GAA and a .864 save percentage with the Rangers during the 1983–84 season. In his career with the Rangers, Weeks had a 42–33–14 record with a 3.83 GAA and a .866 save percentage in 94 games from 1980 to 1984.

During the NHL Waiver Draft held on October 9, the Whalers selected right winger Dave Lumley from the Edmonton Oilers and defenseman Wally Weir from the Quebec Nordiques. Lumley scored six goals and 21 points in 56 games with the Oilers in 1983–84. In the playoffs, Lumley scored two goals and seven points in 19 games, helping the Oilers win the 1984 Stanley Cup Final. His best season came in 1981–82, when Lumley scored 32 goals and 74 points in 66 games with Edmonton. Weir played in 25 games with Quebec in 1983–84, scoring two goals and five points. In five seasons with the Nordiques, Weir scored 19 goals and 58 points in 272 games, while accumulating 535 penalty minutes.

== Regular season ==
=== October ===
The Whalers opened the season on the road at Madison Square Garden against the New York Rangers on October 11, as Sylvain Turgeon scored two goals in a 4–4 tie. Two nights later, the Whalers hosted the Boston Bruins in front of a sellout crowd of 14,817. Risto Siltanen was the hero for Hartford, as he scored the overtime winner in a 3–2 victory.

After losing their next game, on the road against the Boston Bruins, the Whalers won three games in a row, improving their record to 4–1–1, before heading out for a four-game western road trip. The Whalers split the four game road trip, opening with two losses against the Calgary Flames and Winnipeg Jets, before rebounding with wins over the Minnesota North Stars and Chicago Black Hawks.

The Whalers finished the month of October with a loss to the Quebec Nordiques on Halloween night. Overall, Hartford earned a record of 6–4–1 as the club earned 13 points. Hartford sat in a tie for first place in the Adams Division with the Montreal Canadiens.

=== November ===
Hartford began November with a blowout loss, losing 8–1 to the Buffalo Sabres on November 2. The next night, the Whalers tied the Sabres 4–4 on home ice during the second game of their home and home series. Four nights later, on November 7, the Whalers were shutout for the first time of the season, losing 3–0 to the Winnipeg Jets, dropping their overall record to 6–6–2.

On November 10, Greg Millen stopped all 28 shots he faced, as the Whalers earned their first shutout of the season, defeating the Quebec Nordiques 1–0. Following this victory, the Whalers lost their next three games, including a 7–0 loss to the Chicago Black Hawks. During this slump, on November 16, the Whalers acquired forward Pat Boutette from the Pittsburgh Penguins for Ville Siren. Boutette had previously played with the Whalers from 1979 to 1981. At the time of the trade, Boutette had a goal and four points in 14 games with the Penguins.

The Whalers ended their three-game losing skid with a 9–3 victory over the Pittsburgh Penguins on November 22, as Mark Johnson and Greg Malone each scored two goals. Following a 4–4 against the Philadelphia Flyers, Hartford dropped their final two games of the month.

Hartford struggled to a 2–7–2 record during November, bringing their overall record to 8–11–3 through their first 19 games. The Whalers dropped to last place in the Adams Division, three points behind the fourth place Buffalo Sabres.

=== December ===
The losses continued at the beginning of December, as Hartford lost two road games to begin the month, 8–4 to the Quebec Nordiques and 9–3 to the Montreal Canadiens.

Hartford snapped out of their skid on December 5, defeating the Montreal Canadiens 5–3, which began a five-game unbeaten streak, in which the Whalers posted a 4–0–1 record, bringing their record to 12–13–4.

The Whalers were unable to continue their winning ways, as the club dropped their final two games before Christmas, including a 10–5 loss to the Montreal Canadiens. After the Christmas break, the club defeated the New Jersey Devils 5–3 to snap their losing streak, however, Hartford would drop their final two games of the month.

Hartford earned a record of 5–6–1 during December. Their overall record was 13–17–4, as the team had earned 30 points. The Whalers remained in last place in the Adams Division, eight points behind the Quebec Nordiques for the fourth and final playoff position.

=== January ===
The Whalers opened 1985 with a 7–3 loss to the Quebec Nordiques on January 2, dropping their third consecutive game, and their fifth loss in their past six games.

The next night, the Whalers snapped their losing streak with a 6–2 win over the Detroit Red Wings, which started a four-game unbeaten streak for the team (3–0–1). Following a 4–4 tie against the Buffalo Sabres on January 8, the Whalers record improved to 16–18–5. The Whalers were within four points of the Boston Bruins for the final playoff position in the Adams Division.

The Whalers lost their next five games before snapping their skid with a 3–2 win over the Boston Bruins on January 26. The club then lost their next two games to close out January with seven losses in their final eight games.

Hartford slumped to a 4–8–1 during 13 games in January, bringing their record to 17–25–5 through January. The club continued to be in last place, 16 points behind the fourth place Boston Bruins.

=== February ===
The losses continued to pile up during February, as Hartford posted a 0–5–1 record during their first six games of the month. Among the lowlights was a 10–4 loss to the Quebec Nordiques on February 10.

Hartford ended their losing streak on February 14, as Steve Weeks made 19 saves, as the Whalers shutout the New Jersey Devils 4–0. This began a stretch in which the club posted a 3–1–1 record in a five-game stretch.

On February 21, the Whalers were involved in a blockbuster trade, as Hartford traded goaltender Greg Millen and centre Mark Johnson to the St. Louis Blues for goaltender Mike Liut and future considerations. Liut had a 12–12–6 record with a 3.83 GAA and a .880 save percentage with St. Louis during the 1984–85 season. Liut led the NHL in victories during the 1979–80 season with 32, and in 1980–81, he won the Lester B. Pearson Award, given annually to the most outstanding player in the NHL. In 347 career games with the Blues, Liut was 151–133–52 with a 3.59 GAA and a .885 save percentage.

On February 23, Liut appeared in his first game with the Whalers, as he made 30 saves, however, the club lost to the Los Angeles Kings 2–1 in overtime. Hartford continued to struggle to close out the month, as they dropped their remaining two games.

The Whalers earned a record of 3–9–2 in February, dropping their overall record to 20–34–7. Hartford remained out of the playoff picture, 15 points behind the fourth place Boston Bruins.

=== March/April ===
Hartford opened March with a 4–1 win over the New Jersey Devils behind a 28-save performance by Steve Weeks. Following the win, the Whalers would go on a six-game winless skid (0–4–2).

On March 11, the Whalers acquired center Dean Evason and goaltender Peter Sidorkiewicz from the Washington Capitals in exchange for David Jensen. Evason had three goals and seven points in 15 games with the Capitals, while Sidorkiewicz was already playing with the Whalers AHL affiliate, the Binghamton Whalers, as the Capitals and Hartford shared the affiliate.

On March 16, Steve Weeks made 28 saves in a 5–0 shutout victory over the St. Louis Blues, ending Hartford's winless streak. This victory kicked off a seven-game winning streak for Hartford. On March 17, Mike Liut earned his first win in a Whalers uniform, as Hartford beat the Pittsburgh Penguins 4–3. On March 29, the final game of the winning streak, Ray Ferraro scored a hat trick in a wild 8–7 win over the Edmonton Oilers.

Hartford finished the season with a 2–3–0 record in their final five games after the winning streak. The team earned a record of 10–7–2 in their final 19 games. The overall record of the Whalers was 30–41–9, as Hartford earned 69 points, and finished in last place in the Adams Division, 13 points behind the fourth place Boston Bruins. This was the fifth consecutive season that the team failed the qualify for the post-season.

=== Final standings ===
Adams Division
	GP	W	L	T	GF	GA	Pts
**Montreal Canadiens**	80	41	27	12	309	262	94
**Quebec Nordiques**	80	41	30	9	323	275	91
**Buffalo Sabres**	80	38	28	14	290	237	90
**Boston Bruins**	80	36	34	10	303	287	82
Hartford Whalers	80	30	41	9	268	318	69

Note: GP = Games played, W = Wins, L = Losses, T = Ties, Pts = Points, GF = Goals for, GA = Goals against
Note: Teams that qualified for the playoffs are highlighted in bold.

=== Record vs. opponents ===
Adams Division record vs. opponents

==== Vs. Wales Conference ====
**Vs. Adams Division**

1984–85 NHL records
Team	**BOS**	**BUF**	**HFD**	**MTL**	**QUE**	**Total**
Boston	—	3–4–1	4–4	3–4–1	2–4–2	**12–16–4**
Buffalo	4–3–1	—	5–0–3	2–4–2	3–4–1	**14–11–7**
Hartford	4–4	0–5–3	—	2–5−1	3−5	**9–19–4**
Montreal	4–3–1	4–2–2	5–2−1	—	6–1–1	**19–8–5**
Quebec	4–2–2	4–3–1	5–3	1–6–1	—	**14–14–4**

**Vs. Patrick Division**

1984–85 NHL records
Team	**NJD**	**NYI**	**NYR**	**PHI**	**PIT**	**WSH**	**Total**
Boston	3−0	2−1	1−0–2	1−2	2−1	1−2	**10−6−2**
Buffalo	3−0	1−2	1−1−1	1−1–1	2−0–1	2−1	**10−5−3**
Hartford	3−0	1–1–1	1–0–2	0–2–1	2–1	2−1	**9−5−4**
Montreal	1−1–1	2−1	2–0–1	2−1	2−1	1−1–1	**10−5−3**
Quebec	1–1−1	3−0	2–1	1−1−1	3−0	1−2	**11−5−2**

==== Vs. Campbell Conference ====
**Vs. Norris Division**

1984–85 NHL records
Team	**CHI**	**DET**	**MIN**	**STL**	**TOR**	**Total**
Boston	0–3	3–0	3–0	1–0–2	2–1	**9–4–2**
Buffalo	3−0	1−1−1	3−0	1−2	2−1	**10−4−1**
Hartford	2–1	2−1	1−2	2–1	2–1	**9–6–0**
Montreal	1−2	1−1–1	1–2	2–0–1	0−3	**5–8–2**
Quebec	3–0	1–2	3–0	2–1	1–0–2	**10–3–2**

**Vs. Smythe Division**

1984–85 NHL records
Team	**CGY**	**EDM**	**LAK**	**VAN**	**WIN**	**Total**
Boston	0−3	1−2	1−0–2	2−1	1−2	**5−8−2**
Buffalo	3−0	0–2–1	0−2−1	0−2–1	1−2	**4−8−3**
Hartford	0−3	1–2	0–2–1	1–2	1–2	**3–11–1**
Montreal	0–2−1	2−1	2−0–1	1–2	2−1	**7−6−2**
Quebec	1−1–1	0−3	2−1	2−1	1−2	**6−8−1**

== Schedule and results ==
1984–85 regular season
October

Game	Result	Date	Score	Opponent	Record	Attendance
1	T	October 11, 1984	4–4 OT	@ New York Rangers (1984–85)	0–0–1	17,407
2	W	October 13, 1984	3–2 OT	Boston Bruins (1984–85)	1–0–1	14,817
3	L	October 14, 1984	2–4	@ Boston Bruins (1984–85)	1–1–1	12,103
4	W	October 17, 1984	5–3	@ Toronto Maple Leafs (1984–85)	2–1–1	16,182
5	W	October 18, 1984	7–3	Detroit Red Wings (1984–85)	3–1–1	9,148
6	W	October 20, 1984	3–2	Vancouver Canucks (1984–85)	4–1–1	11,578
7	L	October 23, 1984	4–9	@ Calgary Flames (1984–85)	4–2–1	16,683
8	L	October 24, 1984	4–8	@ Winnipeg Jets (1984–85)	4–3–1	10,442
9	W	October 27, 1984	5–3	@ Minnesota North Stars (1984–85)	5–3–1	12,224
10	W	October 28, 1984	4–1	@ Chicago Black Hawks (1984–85)	6–3–1	17,312
11	L	October 31, 1984	3–5	Quebec Nordiques (1984–85)	6–4–1	10,152

November

Game	Result	Date	Score	Opponent	Record	Attendance
12	L	November 2, 1984	1–8	@ Buffalo Sabres (1984–85)	6–5–1	14,146
13	T	November 3, 1984	4–4 OT	Buffalo Sabres (1984–85)	6–5–2	13,509
14	L	November 7, 1984	0–3	Winnipeg Jets (1984–85)	6–6–2	9,871
15	W	November 10, 1984	1–0	@ Quebec Nordiques (1984–85)	7–6–2	14,801
16	L	November 15, 1984	1–6	@ Philadelphia Flyers (1984–85)	7–7–2	17,191
17	L	November 17, 1984	0–7	Chicago Black Hawks (1984–85)	7–8–2	13,493
18	L	November 21, 1984	2–4	@ Detroit Red Wings (1984–85)	7–9–2	19,144
19	W	November 22, 1984	9–3	Pittsburgh Penguins (1984–85)	8–9–2	9,722
20	T	November 24, 1984	4–4 OT	Philadelphia Flyers (1984–85)	8–9–3	14,140
21	L	November 28, 1984	2–4	Minnesota North Stars (1984–85)	8–10–3	10,200
22	L	November 30, 1984	2–4	Edmonton Oilers (1984–85)	8–11–3	14,817

December

Game	Result	Date	Score	Opponent	Record	Attendance
23	L	December 1, 1984	4–8	@ Quebec Nordiques (1984–85)	8–12–3	14,268
24	L	December 3, 1984	3–9	@ Montreal Canadiens (1984–85)	8–13–3	17,007
25	W	December 5, 1984	5–3	Montreal Canadiens (1984–85)	9–13–3	10,278
26	W	December 8, 1984	4–3 OT	@ New York Islanders (1984–85)	10–13–3	15,834
27	T	December 12, 1984	2–2 OT	Buffalo Sabres (1984–85)	10–13–4	10,945
28	W	December 15, 1984	4–3 OT	Montreal Canadiens (1984–85)	11–13–4	11,917
29	W	December 19, 1984	6–5	Boston Bruins (1984–85)	12–13–4	12,944
30	L	December 21, 1984	0–1	New York Islanders (1984–85)	12–14–4	13,227
31	L	December 22, 1984	5–10	@ Montreal Canadiens (1984–85)	12–15–4	15,973
32	W	December 26, 1984	5–3	New Jersey Devils (1984–85)	13–15–4	13,412
33	L	December 28, 1984	0–4	@ Pittsburgh Penguins (1984–85)	13–16–4	14,451
34	L	December 29, 1984	2–3	@ Washington Capitals (1984–85)	13–17–4	13,314

January

Game	Result	Date	Score	Opponent	Record	Attendance
35	L	January 2, 1985	3–7	@ Quebec Nordiques (1984–85)	13–18–4	14,752
36	W	January 3, 1985	6–2	Detroit Red Wings (1984–85)	14–18–4	10,491
37	W	January 5, 1985	4–3	Chicago Black Hawks (1984–85)	15–18–4	13,172
38	W	January 7, 1985	7–4	@ Toronto Maple Leafs (1984–85)	16–18–4	16,182
39	T	January 8, 1985	4–4 OT	@ Buffalo Sabres (1984–85)	16–18–5	13,086
40	L	January 12, 1985	4–5	@ Minnesota North Stars (1984–85)	16–19–5	13,239
41	L	January 15, 1985	2–5	Calgary Flames (1984–85)	16–20–5	10,083
42	L	January 17, 1985	4–5	@ Montreal Canadiens (1984–85)	16–21–5	15,658
43	L	January 19, 1985	0–2	Buffalo Sabres (1984–85)	16–22–5	14,217
44	L	January 22, 1985	5–8	Montreal Canadiens (1984–85)	16–23–5	12,675
45	W	January 26, 1985	3–2	@ Boston Bruins (1984–85)	17–23–5	13,704
46	L	January 27, 1985	4–8	Boston Bruins (1984–85)	17–24–5	14,817
47	L	January 31, 1985	3–5	@ Los Angeles Kings (1984–85)	17–25–5	10,218

February

Game	Result	Date	Score	Opponent	Record	Attendance
48	L	February 1, 1985	3–4 OT	@ Vancouver Canucks (1984–85)	17–26–5	11,121
49	L	February 3, 1985	3–6	@ Edmonton Oilers (1984–85)	17–27–5	17,498
50	L	February 6, 1985	4–7	Calgary Flames (1984–85)	17–28–5	9,382
51	L	February 7, 1985	5–7	@ Boston Bruins (1984–85)	17–29–5	12,636
52	T	February 9, 1985	2–2 OT	New York Rangers (1984–85)	17–29–6	14,817
53	L	February 10, 1985	4–10	Quebec Nordiques (1984–85)	17–30–6	11,090
54	W	February 14, 1985	4–0	@ New Jersey Devils (1984–85)	18–30–6	10,123
55	T	February 16, 1985	4–4 OT	@ New York Islanders (1984–85)	18–30–7	15,757
56	L	February 17, 1985	4–5 OT	Toronto Maple Leafs (1984–85)	18–31–7	10,511
57	W	February 19, 1985	6–2	@ Winnipeg Jets (1984–85)	19–31–7	10,501
58	W	February 21, 1985	4–3 OT	@ New York Rangers (1984–85)	20–31–7	17,416
59	L	February 23, 1985	1–2 OT	Los Angeles Kings (1984–85)	20–32–7	11,462
60	L	February 24, 1985	2–3	St. Louis Blues (1984–85)	20–33–7	10,775
61	L	February 26, 1985	2–3	Philadelphia Flyers (1984–85)	20–34–7	11,414

March

Game	Result	Date	Score	Opponent	Record	Attendance
62	W	March 1, 1985	4–1	@ New Jersey Devils (1984–85)	21–34–7	10,591
63	L	March 3, 1985	6–7 OT	Vancouver Canucks (1984–85)	21–35–7	10,070
64	L	March 5, 1985	3–6	@ Buffalo Sabres (1984–85)	21–36–7	14,389
65	L	March 7, 1985	0–4	@ Boston Bruins (1984–85)	21–37–7	12,512
66	L	March 9, 1985	3–4	@ Montreal Canadiens (1984–85)	21–38–7	18,090
67	T	March 10, 1985	5–5 OT	Montreal Canadiens (1984–85)	21–38–8	10,787
68	T	March 13, 1985	3–3 OT	@ Los Angeles Kings (1984–85)	21–38–9	10,938
69	W	March 16, 1985	5–0	@ St. Louis Blues (1984–85)	22–38–9	16,752
70	W	March 17, 1985	4–3	Pittsburgh Penguins (1984–85)	23–38–9	11,143
71	W	March 20, 1985	3–2	St. Louis Blues (1984–85)	24–38–9	11,674
72	W	March 23, 1985	5–2	Boston Bruins (1984–85)	25–38–9	14,817
73	W	March 24, 1985	2–1	Quebec Nordiques (1984–85)	26–38–9	10,440
74	W	March 27, 1985	3–1	@ Washington Capitals (1984–85)	27–38–9	14,355
75	W	March 29, 1985	8–7	Edmonton Oilers (1984–85)	28–38–9	14,817
76	L	March 30, 1985	1–2	Buffalo Sabres (1984–85)	28–39–9	12,518

April

Game	Result	Date	Score	Opponent	Record	Attendance
77	L	April 2, 1985	1–2	@ Buffalo Sabres (1984–85)	28–40–9	15,570
78	W	April 4, 1985	2–0	Washington Capitals (1984–85)	29–40–9	12,737
79	W	April 6, 1985	2–1	Quebec Nordiques (1984–85)	30–40–9	12,730
80	L	April 7, 1985	1–4	@ Quebec Nordiques (1984–85)	30–41–9	15,004

Legend: Win (2 points) Loss (0 points) Tie (1 point)

== Transactions ==
The Whalers were involved in the following transactions during the 1984–85 season.

=== Trades ===
September 5, 1984	To New York Rangers 3rd-round pick in 1986 – Shaun Clouston	To Hartford Whalers Steve Weeks
November 16, 1984	To Pittsburgh Penguins Ville Siren	To Hartford Whalers Pat Boutette
February 21, 1985	To St. Louis Blues Mark Johnson; Greg Millen	To Hartford Whalers Mike Liut; Future Considerations – Jorgen Pettersson on Apr. 16/85
March 11, 1985	To Washington Capitals David Jensen	To Hartford Whalers Dean Evason; Peter Sidorkiewicz

=== Waivers ===
October 9, 1984	From Edmonton Oilers Dave Lumley
October 9, 1984	From Quebec Nordiques Wally Weir
December 5, 1984	To Edmonton Oilers Tony Currie
February 6, 1985	To Edmonton Oilers Dave Lumley
March 1, 1985	To Pittsburgh Penguins Wally Weir

=== Free agents ===
Player	New Team
Doug Sulliman	New Jersey Devils

== Draft picks ==
Hartford's draft picks at the 1984 NHL entry draft held at the Montreal Forum in Montreal.

Round	#	Player	Nationality	College/Junior/Club team (League)
1	11	Sylvain Cote	Canada	Quebec Remparts (QMJHL)
6	110	Mike Millar	Canada	Brantford Alexanders (OHL)
7	131	Mike Vellucci	United States	Belleville Bulls (OHL)
9	173	John Devereaux	United States	Scituate High School (USHS-MA)
10	193	Brent Regan	Canada	St. Albert Saints (AJHL)
11	214	Jim Culhane	Canada	Western Michigan University (CCHA)
12	234	Peter Abric	Canada	North Bay Centennials (OHL)

== See also ==
- 1984–85 NHL season
