= 1984–85 Buffalo Sabres season =

NHL hockey team season

1984–85 Buffalo Sabres
- Division: 3rd Adams
- Conference: 5th Wales
- 1984–85 record: 38–28–14
- Home record: 23–10–7
- Road record: 15–18–7
- Goals for: 290
- Goals against: 237

Team information
- General manager: Scotty Bowman
- Coach: Scotty Bowman
- Captain: Gilbert Perreault
- Alternate captains: None
- Arena: Buffalo Memorial Auditorium

Team leaders
- Goals: Dave Andreychuk (31)
- Assists: Phil Housley; Gilbert Perreault (53)
- Points: Gilbert Perreault (83)
- Penalty minutes: Larry Playfair (157)
- Wins: Tom Barrasso (25)
- Goals against average: Tom Barrasso (2.67)

The 1984–85 Buffalo Sabres season was the 15th season for the National Hockey League (NHL) franchise that was established on May 22, 1970.

== Regular season ==
=== Final standings ===
Adams Division
	GP	W	L	T	GF	GA	Pts
**Montreal Canadiens**	80	41	27	12	309	262	94
**Quebec Nordiques**	80	41	30	9	323	275	91
**Buffalo Sabres**	80	38	28	14	290	237	90
**Boston Bruins**	80	36	34	10	303	287	82
Hartford Whalers	80	30	41	9	268	318	69

Note: GP = Games played, W = Wins, L = Losses, T = Ties, Pts = Points, GF = Goals for, GA = Goals against
Note: Teams that qualified for the playoffs are highlighted in bold.

=== Record vs. opponents ===
Adams Division record vs. opponents

==== Vs. Wales Conference ====
**Vs. Adams Division**

1984–85 NHL records
Team	**BOS**	**BUF**	**HFD**	**MTL**	**QUE**	**Total**
Boston	—	3–4–1	4–4	3–4–1	2–4–2	**12–16–4**
Buffalo	4–3–1	—	5–0–3	2–4–2	3–4–1	**14–11–7**
Hartford	4–4	0–5–3	—	2–5−1	3−5	**9–19–4**
Montreal	4–3–1	4–2–2	5–2−1	—	6–1–1	**19–8–5**
Quebec	4–2–2	4–3–1	5–3	1–6–1	—	**14–14–4**

**Vs. Patrick Division**

1984–85 NHL records
Team	**NJD**	**NYI**	**NYR**	**PHI**	**PIT**	**WSH**	**Total**
Boston	3−0	2−1	1−0–2	1−2	2−1	1−2	**10−6−2**
Buffalo	3−0	1−2	1−1−1	1−1–1	2−0–1	2−1	**10−5−3**
Hartford	3−0	1–1–1	1–0–2	0–2–1	2–1	2−1	**9−5−4**
Montreal	1−1–1	2−1	2–0–1	2−1	2−1	1−1–1	**10−5−3**
Quebec	1–1−1	3−0	2–1	1−1−1	3−0	1−2	**11−5−2**

==== Vs. Campbell Conference ====
**Vs. Norris Division**

1984–85 NHL records
Team	**CHI**	**DET**	**MIN**	**STL**	**TOR**	**Total**
Boston	0–3	3–0	3–0	1–0–2	2–1	**9–4–2**
Buffalo	3−0	1−1−1	3−0	1−2	2−1	**10−4−1**
Hartford	2–1	2−1	1−2	2–1	2–1	**9–6–0**
Montreal	1−2	1−1–1	1–2	2–0–1	0−3	**5–8–2**
Quebec	3–0	1–2	3–0	2–1	1–0–2	**10–3–2**

**Vs. Smythe Division**

1984–85 NHL records
Team	**CGY**	**EDM**	**LAK**	**VAN**	**WIN**	**Total**
Boston	0−3	1−2	1−0–2	2−1	1−2	**5−8−2**
Buffalo	3−0	0–2–1	0−2−1	0−2–1	1−2	**4−8−3**
Hartford	0−3	1–2	0–2–1	1–2	1–2	**3–11–1**
Montreal	0–2−1	2−1	2−0–1	1–2	2−1	**7−6−2**
Quebec	1−1–1	0−3	2−1	2−1	1−2	**6−8−1**

== Schedule and results ==
1984–85 regular season
October

Game	Result	Date	Score	Opponent	Record
1	W	October 11, 1984	4–3	Montreal Canadiens (1984–85)	1–0–0
2	L	October 13, 1984	3–4 OT	@ Toronto Maple Leafs (1984–85)	1–1–0
3	W	October 14, 1984	6–4	Detroit Red Wings (1984–85)	2–1–0
4	L	October 17, 1984	1–4	@ Quebec Nordiques (1984–85)	2–2–0
5	W	October 19, 1984	5–4	Quebec Nordiques (1984–85)	3–2–0
6	W	October 21, 1984	8–6	Minnesota North Stars (1984–85)	4–2–0
7	L	October 25, 1984	2–3	@ Montreal Canadiens (1984–85)	4–3–0
8	L	October 26, 1984	3–7	@ Detroit Red Wings (1984–85)	4–4–0
9	W	October 28, 1984	6–2	Calgary Flames (1984–85)	5–4–0
10	T	October 31, 1984	3–3 OT	Philadelphia Flyers (1984–85)	5–4–1

November

Game	Result	Date	Score	Opponent	Record
11	W	November 2, 1984	8–1	Hartford Whalers (1984–85)	6–4–1
12	T	November 3, 1984	4–4 OT	@ Hartford Whalers (1984–85)	6–4–2
13	W	November 7, 1984	9–6	@ Minnesota North Stars (1984–85)	7–4–2
14	L	November 9, 1984	2–3	@ Los Angeles Kings (1984–85)	7–5–2
15	L	November 11, 1984	2–3	@ Winnipeg Jets (1984–85)	7–6–2
16	W	November 14, 1984	4–2	Boston Bruins (1984–85)	8–6–2
17	W	November 16, 1984	3–2	Washington Capitals (1984–85)	9–6–2
18	L	November 17, 1984	2–3	@ Washington Capitals (1984–85)	9–7–2
19	L	November 21, 1984	2–3	@ New York Rangers (1984–85)	9–8–2
20	L	November 23, 1984	2–4	Philadelphia Flyers (1984–85)	9–9–2
21	L	November 24, 1984	3–6	@ New York Islanders (1984–85)	9–10–2
22	T	November 27, 1984	2–2 OT	@ Pittsburgh Penguins (1984–85)	9–10–3
23	T	November 30, 1984	2–2 OT	Montreal Canadiens (1984–85)	9–10–4

December

Game	Result	Date	Score	Opponent	Record
24	L	December 1, 1984	2–3	@ Montreal Canadiens (1984–85)	9–11–4
25	T	December 5, 1984	3–3 OT	Boston Bruins (1984–85)	9–11–5
26	W	December 8, 1984	3–1	@ Boston Bruins (1984–85)	10–11–5
27	T	December 9, 1984	4–4 OT	Quebec Nordiques (1984–85)	10–11–6
28	T	December 12, 1984	2–2 OT	@ Hartford Whalers (1984–85)	10–11–7
29	T	December 14, 1984	4–4 OT	Detroit Red Wings (1984–85)	10–11–8
30	T	December 16, 1984	2–2 OT	Vancouver Canucks (1984–85)	10–11–9
31	W	December 19, 1984	6–3	@ Chicago Black Hawks (1984–85)	11–11–9
32	L	December 22, 1984	1–3	@ Quebec Nordiques (1984–85)	11–12–9
33	W	December 23, 1984	3–2	St. Louis Blues (1984–85)	12–12–9
34	W	December 26, 1984	6–0	Toronto Maple Leafs (1984–85)	13–12–9
35	W	December 28, 1984	4–0	Winnipeg Jets (1984–85)	14–12–9
36	W	December 29, 1984	2–1	@ New Jersey Devils (1984–85)	15–12–9
37	W	December 31, 1984	6–4	New Jersey Devils (1984–85)	16–12–9

January

Game	Result	Date	Score	Opponent	Record
38	W	January 4, 1985	7–2	Pittsburgh Penguins (1984–85)	17–12–9
39	W	January 5, 1985	7–3	@ New York Islanders (1984–85)	18–12–9
40	T	January 8, 1985	4–4 OT	Hartford Whalers (1984–85)	18–12–10
41	W	January 10, 1985	3–0	@ Boston Bruins (1984–85)	19–12–10
42	T	January 12, 1985	1–1 OT	@ Montreal Canadiens (1984–85)	19–12–11
43	L	January 13, 1985	4–5	Edmonton Oilers (1984–85)	19–13–11
44	T	January 16, 1985	2–2 OT	@ New York Rangers (1984–85)	19–13–12
45	W	January 18, 1985	4–3	Chicago Black Hawks (1984–85)	20–13–12
46	W	January 19, 1985	2–0	@ Hartford Whalers (1984–85)	21–13–12
47	W	January 22, 1985	3–2	New York Rangers (1984–85)	22–13–12
48	L	January 24, 1985	2–5	@ Boston Bruins (1984–85)	22–14–12
49	L	January 25, 1985	2–4	@ Quebec Nordiques (1984–85)	22–15–12
50	W	January 27, 1985	3–2	Quebec Nordiques (1984–85)	23–15–12
51	W	January 30, 1985	6–2	Boston Bruins (1984–85)	24–15–12

February

Game	Result	Date	Score	Opponent	Record
52	W	February 2, 1985	6–3	@ Philadelphia Flyers (1984–85)	25–15–12
53	W	February 3, 1985	6–1	Calgary Flames (1984–85)	26–15–12
54	W	February 6, 1985	3–1	@ Minnesota North Stars (1984–85)	27–15–12
55	W	February 9, 1985	6–1	@ Calgary Flames (1984–85)	28–15–12
56	L	February 15, 1985	3–4 OT	Montreal Canadiens (1984–85)	28–16–12
57	W	February 16, 1985	4–3	@ Montreal Canadiens (1984–85)	29–16–12
58	L	February 18, 1985	4–6	Edmonton Oilers (1984–85)	29–17–12
59	L	February 22, 1985	1–4	St. Louis Blues (1984–85)	29–18–12
60	L	February 24, 1985	2–4	Los Angeles Kings (1984–85)	29–19–12
61	W	February 26, 1985	4–3	@ New Jersey Devils (1984–85)	30–19–12
62	L	February 27, 1985	1–3	@ St. Louis Blues (1984–85)	30–20–12

March

Game	Result	Date	Score	Opponent	Record
63	W	March 2, 1985	4–0	@ Washington Capitals (1984–85)	31–20–12
64	L	March 3, 1985	2–3	New York Islanders (1984–85)	31–21–12
65	W	March 5, 1985	6–3	Hartford Whalers (1984–85)	32–21–12
66	W	March 8, 1985	7–2	Chicago Black Hawks (1984–85)	33–21–12
67	T	March 10, 1985	4–4 OT	@ Los Angeles Kings (1984–85)	33–21–13
68	L	March 13, 1985	4–6	@ Vancouver Canucks (1984–85)	33–22–13
69	T	March 15, 1985	4–4 OT	@ Edmonton Oilers (1984–85)	33–22–14
70	L	March 17, 1985	3–5	@ Winnipeg Jets (1984–85)	33–23–14
71	L	March 20, 1985	4–5	Vancouver Canucks (1984–85)	33–24–14
72	W	March 22, 1985	3–1	Pittsburgh Penguins (1984–85)	34–24–14
73	L	March 24, 1985	3–4 OT	Boston Bruins (1984–85)	34–25–14
74	L	March 26, 1985	3–4	@ Quebec Nordiques (1984–85)	34–26–14
75	W	March 30, 1985	2–1	@ Hartford Whalers (1984–85)	35–26–14
76	W	March 31, 1985	3–1	Quebec Nordiques (1984–85)	36–26–14

April

Game	Result	Date	Score	Opponent	Record
77	W	April 2, 1985	2–1	Hartford Whalers (1984–85)	37–26–14
78	L	April 4, 1985	3–5	@ Boston Bruins (1984–85)	37–27–14
79	W	April 6, 1985	5–2	@ Toronto Maple Leafs (1984–85)	38–27–14
80	L	April 7, 1985	4–5	Montreal Canadiens (1984–85)	38–28–14

Legend: Win (2 points) Loss (0 points) Tie (1 point)

== Playoffs ==
1985 Stanley Cup playoffs

=== (A2) Quebec Nordiques vs. (A3) Buffalo Sabres ===
Buffalo Sabres vs Quebec Nordiques
Date	Visitors	Score	Home	Score
April 10	Buffalo	2	Quebec	5
April 11	Buffalo	2	Quebec	3
April 13	Quebec	4	Buffalo	6
April 14	Quebec	4	Buffalo	7
April 16	Buffalo	5	Quebec	6

Quebec won best-of-five series 3–2.

== Draft picks ==
Buffalo's draft picks at the 1984 NHL entry draft held at the Montreal Forum in Montreal. The Sabres attempted to select Eric Weinrich with their ninth round pick, but Weinrich was born later than the cutoff date of September 15, 1966, and was therefore ineligible for the 1984 draft.

Round	#	Player	Nationality	College/Junior/Club team (League)
1	18	Mikael Andersson	Sweden	Västra Frölunda (Sweden)
2	39	Doug Trapp	Canada	Regina Pats (WHL)
3	60	Ray Sheppard	Canada	Cornwall Royals (OHL)
4	81	Bob Halkidis	Canada	London Knights (OHL)
5	102	Joey Rampton	Canada	Sault Ste. Marie Greyhounds (OHL)
6	123	James Gasseau	Canada	Drummondville Voltigeurs (QMJHL)
7	144	Darcy Wakaluk	Canada	Kelowna Wings (WHL)
8	165	Orvar Stambert	Sweden	Djurgardens IF (Sweden)
10	206	Brian McKinnon	Canada	Ottawa 67's (OHL)
11	226	Grant Delcourt	Canada	Kelowna Wings (WHL)
12	247	Sean Baker	United States	Seattle Breakers (WHL)

== See also ==
- 1984–85 NHL season
