= 1984–85 St. Louis Blues season =

National Hockey League team season

1984–85 St. Louis Blues
- Norris Division champions
- Division: 1st Norris
- Conference: 4th Campbell
- 1984–85 record: 37–31–12
- Home record: 21–12–7
- Road record: 16–19–5
- Goals for: 299
- Goals against: 288

Team information
- General manager: Ron Caron
- Coach: Jacques Demers
- Captain: Brian Sutter
- Alternate captains: None
- Arena: St. Louis Arena

Team leaders
- Goals: Joe Mullen (40)
- Assists: Bernie Federko (73)
- Points: Bernie Federko (103)
- Penalty minutes: Dwight Schofield (181)
- Wins: Rick Wamsley (23)
- Goals against average: Rick Wamsley (3.27)

The 1984–85 St. Louis Blues season was the St. Louis Blues' 18th season in the National Hockey League (NHL).

== Regular season ==
=== Final standings ===
Norris Division
	GP	W	L	T	GF	GA	Pts
**St. Louis Blues**	80	37	31	12	299	288	86
**Chicago Black Hawks**	80	38	35	7	309	299	83
**Detroit Red Wings**	80	27	41	12	313	357	66
**Minnesota North Stars**	80	25	43	12	268	321	62
Toronto Maple Leafs	80	20	52	8	253	358	48

Note: GP = Games played, W = Wins, L = Losses, T = Ties, Pts = Points, GF = Goals for, GA = Goals against
Note: Teams that qualified for the playoffs are highlighted in bold.

=== Record vs. opponents ===
Norris Division record vs. opponents

==== Vs. Campbell Conference ====
**Vs. Norris Division**

1984–85 NHL records
Team	**CHI**	**DET**	**MIN**	**STL**	**TOR**	**Total**
Chicago	—	3−3−2	4−3−1	3−4−1	6−1−1	**16−11−5**
Detroit	3−3−2	—	3−2−3	1−6−1	5−3	**12−14−6**
Minnesota	3−4−1	2−3−3	—	1−6−1	6−2	**12−15−5**
St. Louis	4−3−1	6−1−1	6−1−1	—	4−3−1	**20−8−4**
Toronto	1−6−1	3−5	2−6	3−4−1	—	**9−21−2**

**Vs. Smythe Division**

1984–85 NHL records
Team	**CGY**	**EDM**	**LAK**	**VAN**	**WIN**	**Total**
Chicago	2−1	0−3	2−0−1	2−1	1−1−1	**7−6−2**
Detroit	1−2	0−3	1−2	2−1	0−2−1	**4−10−1**
Minnesota	0−1−2	0−3	1−1−1	1−1−1	1−2	**3−8−4**
St. Louis	3−0	0−3	2−1	3−0	1−0−2	**9−4−2**
Toronto	0−3	0−2−1	1−2	1−1−1	0−3	**2−11−2**

**Vs. Wales Conference**

**Vs. Adams Division**

1984–85 NHL records
Team	**BOS**	**BUF**	**HFD**	**MTL**	**QUE**	**Total**
Chicago	3−0	0−3	1−2	2−1	0−3	**6−9−0**
Detroit	0−3	1−1−1	1−2	1−1−1	2−1	**5−8−2**
Minnesota	0−3	0−3	2−1	2−1	0−3	**4−11−0**
St. Louis	0−1−2	2−1	1−2	0−2−1	1−2	**4−8−3**
Toronto	1−2	1−2	1−2	3−0	0−1−2	**6−7−2**

**Vs. Patrick Division**

1984–85 NHL records
Team	**NJD**	**NYI**	**NYR**	**PHI**	**PIT**	**WSH**	**Total**
Chicago	3−0	0−3	3−0	1−2	2−1	0−3	**9−9−0**
Detroit	1−1−1	1−2	2−1	0−2−1	1−1−1	1−2	**6−9−3**
Minnesota	1−1−1	1−1−1	2−1	0−3	2−1	0−2−1	**6−9−3**
St. Louis	2−0−1	0−3	0−2−1	0−3	2−1	0−2−1	**4−11−3**
Toronto	0−3	1−2	0−2−1	1−2	1−2	0−2−1	**3−13−2**

== Schedule and results ==
1984–85 regular season
October

Game	Result	Date	Score	Opponent	Record
1	W	October 11, 1984	4–2	@ Calgary Flames (1984–85)	1–0–0
2	L	October 12, 1984	1–5	@ Edmonton Oilers (1984–85)	1–1–0
3	W	October 14, 1984	5–2	@ Los Angeles Kings (1984–85)	2–1–0
4	L	October 17, 1984	3–4	@ Chicago Black Hawks (1984–85)	2–2–0
5	W	October 20, 1984	8–3	New Jersey Devils (1984–85)	3–2–0
6	L	October 24, 1984	1–4	Boston Bruins (1984–85)	3–3–0
7	L	October 25, 1984	2–7	@ Philadelphia Flyers (1984–85)	3–4–0
8	L	October 27, 1984	4–5	Chicago Black Hawks (1984–85)	3–5–0
9	W	October 31, 1984	6–5 OT	Toronto Maple Leafs (1984–85)	4–5–0

November

Game	Result	Date	Score	Opponent	Record
10	W	November 3, 1984	5–2	Calgary Flames (1984–85)	5–5–0
11	L	November 6, 1984	3–6	@ New York Islanders (1984–85)	5–6–0
12	W	November 8, 1984	6–2	@ Pittsburgh Penguins (1984–85)	6–6–0
13	L	November 9, 1984	0–6	@ Philadelphia Flyers (1984–85)	6–7–0
14	T	November 11, 1984	1–1 OT	@ Boston Bruins (1984–85)	6–7–1
15	L	November 14, 1984	3–7	Quebec Nordiques (1984–85)	6–8–1
16	W	November 16, 1984	4–2	Quebec Nordiques (1984–85)	7–8–1
17	W	November 20, 1984	5–1	@ Vancouver Canucks (1984–85)	8–8–1
18	W	November 23, 1984	3–1	@ Calgary Flames (1984–85)	9–8–1
19	L	November 24, 1984	6–7	@ Edmonton Oilers (1984–85)	9–9–1
20	W	November 27, 1984	6–1	@ Vancouver Canucks (1984–85)	10–9–1
21	W	November 30, 1984	5–3	@ Detroit Red Wings (1984–85)	11–9–1

December

Game	Result	Date	Score	Opponent	Record
22	W	December 1, 1984	10–5	Detroit Red Wings (1984–85)	12–9–1
23	T	December 4, 1984	2–2 OT	Winnipeg Jets (1984–85)	12–9–2
24	L	December 5, 1984	4–7	@ Pittsburgh Penguins (1984–85)	12–10–2
25	T	December 8, 1984	3–3 OT	Toronto Maple Leafs (1984–85)	12–10–3
26	T	December 11, 1984	3–3 OT	Washington Capitals (1984–85)	12–10–4
27	T	December 13, 1984	4–4 OT	@ New Jersey Devils (1984–85)	12–10–5
28	L	December 15, 1984	2–8	Edmonton Oilers (1984–85)	12–11–5
29	W	December 17, 1984	3–2	@ Toronto Maple Leafs (1984–85)	13–11–5
30	W	December 19, 1984	4–1	Minnesota North Stars (1984–85)	14–11–5
31	L	December 22, 1984	5–7	@ Washington Capitals (1984–85)	14–12–5
32	L	December 23, 1984	2–3	@ Buffalo Sabres (1984–85)	14–13–5
33	W	December 26, 1984	4–3	Chicago Black Hawks (1984–85)	15–13–5
34	L	December 29, 1984	1–5	New York Islanders (1984–85)	15–14–5
35	L	December 30, 1984	2–6	@ New York Rangers (1984–85)	15–15–5

January

Game	Result	Date	Score	Opponent	Record
36	T	January 3, 1985	2–2 OT	Montreal Canadiens (1984–85)	15–15–6
37	L	January 5, 1985	3–6	Philadelphia Flyers (1984–85)	15–16–6
38	W	January 6, 1985	3–2	@ Chicago Black Hawks (1984–85)	16–16–6
39	L	January 9, 1985	2–4	Washington Capitals (1984–85)	16–17–6
40	W	January 10, 1985	5–3	@ Minnesota North Stars (1984–85)	17–17–6
41	T	January 12, 1985	4–4 OT	New York Rangers (1984–85)	17–17–7
42	T	January 16, 1985	4–4 OT	@ Minnesota North Stars (1984–85)	17–17–8
43	W	January 18, 1985	6–2	@ Winnipeg Jets (1984–85)	18–17–8
44	L	January 19, 1985	1–6	@ Toronto Maple Leafs (1984–85)	18–18–8
45	W	January 21, 1985	6–3	@ Detroit Red Wings (1984–85)	19–18–8
46	W	January 25, 1985	6–3	Los Angeles Kings (1984–85)	20–18–8
47	L	January 26, 1985	3–7	Los Angeles Kings (1984–85)	20–19–8
48	T	January 29, 1985	6–6 OT	Winnipeg Jets (1984–85)	20–19–9
49	W	January 31, 1985	3–2	Detroit Red Wings (1984–85)	21–19–9

February

Game	Result	Date	Score	Opponent	Record
50	W	February 2, 1985	5–1	Chicago Black Hawks (1984–85)	22–19–9
51	W	February 3, 1985	6–4	@ Chicago Black Hawks (1984–85)	23–19–9
52	W	February 6, 1985	4–0	Vancouver Canucks (1984–85)	24–19–9
53	T	February 7, 1985	5–5 OT	@ Detroit Red Wings (1984–85)	24–19–10
54	W	February 9, 1985	4–2	Minnesota North Stars (1984–85)	25–19–10
55	W	February 14, 1985	5–3	Toronto Maple Leafs (1984–85)	26–19–10
56	W	February 16, 1985	6–4	Minnesota North Stars (1984–85)	27–19–10
57	L	February 19, 1985	2–5	Montreal Canadiens (1984–85)	27–20–10
58	L	February 20, 1985	2–3	@ Detroit Red Wings (1984–85)	27–21–10
59	W	February 22, 1985	4–1	@ Buffalo Sabres (1984–85)	28–21–10
60	W	February 24, 1985	3–2	@ Hartford Whalers (1984–85)	29–21–10
61	W	February 27, 1985	3–1	Buffalo Sabres (1984–85)	30–21–10

March

Game	Result	Date	Score	Opponent	Record
62	T	March 2, 1985	4–4 OT	Chicago Black Hawks (1984–85)	30–21–11
63	L	March 3, 1985	2–5	@ Chicago Black Hawks (1984–85)	30–22–11
64	W	March 5, 1985	7–2	Toronto Maple Leafs (1984–85)	31–22–11
65	W	March 7, 1985	5–1	Pittsburgh Penguins (1984–85)	32–22–11
66	L	March 9, 1985	1–4	@ Minnesota North Stars (1984–85)	32–23–11
67	W	March 10, 1985	6–2	Detroit Red Wings (1984–85)	33–23–11
68	L	March 12, 1985	5–6	New York Islanders (1984–85)	33–24–11
69	L	March 16, 1985	0–5	Hartford Whalers (1984–85)	33–25–11
70	L	March 18, 1985	3–4 OT	@ Toronto Maple Leafs (1984–85)	33–26–11
71	L	March 20, 1985	2–3	@ Hartford Whalers (1984–85)	33–27–11
72	T	March 21, 1985	1–1 OT	@ Boston Bruins (1984–85)	33–27–12
73	W	March 23, 1985	4–2	Minnesota North Stars (1984–85)	34–27–12
74	L	March 27, 1985	2–4	@ Toronto Maple Leafs (1984–85)	34–28–12
75	L	March 28, 1985	1–5	@ Montreal Canadiens (1984–85)	34–29–12
76	L	March 30, 1985	1–3	@ Quebec Nordiques (1984–85)	34–30–12

April

Game	Result	Date	Score	Opponent	Record
77	W	April 2, 1985	8–4	New Jersey Devils (1984–85)	35–30–12
78	L	April 4, 1985	4–5	New York Rangers (1984–85)	35–31–12
79	W	April 6, 1985	4–3	@ Minnesota North Stars (1984–85)	36–31–12
80	W	April 7, 1985	6–5 OT	Detroit Red Wings (1984–85)	37–31–12

Legend: Win (2 points) Loss (0 points) Tie (1 point)

== Player statistics ==
=== Regular season ===
Scoring

Player	Pos	GP	G	A	Pts	PIM	+/-	PPG	SHG	GWG
Bernie Federko	C	76	30	73	103	27	-10	6	0	3
Joe Mullen	RW	79	40	52	92	6	5	13	0	4
Brian Sutter	LW	77	37	37	74	121	11	14	0	7
Doug Gilmour	C	78	21	36	57	49	3	3	1	3
Jorgen Pettersson	LW	75	23	32	55	20	8	8	0	3
Doug Wickenheiser	C	68	23	20	43	36	9	1	2	3
Greg Paslawski	RW	72	22	20	42	21	6	7	0	2
Mark Reeds	RW	80	9	30	39	25	8	0	1	4
Rob Ramage	D	80	7	31	38	178	-7	1	0	0
Dave Barr	RW	75	16	18	34	32	5	2	0	1
Kevin LaVallee	LW	38	15	17	32	8	2	2	0	1
Craig Levie	D	61	6	23	29	33	2	2	0	1
Tim Bothwell	D	79	4	22	26	62	27	1	0	0
Rik Wilson	D	51	8	16	24	39	14	3	0	0
Pat Hickey	LW	57	10	13	23	32	-4	0	3	1
Perry Anderson	LW	71	9	9	18	146	2	0	0	1
Gilbert Delorme	D	74	2	12	14	53	7	1	0	0
Mark Johnson	C	17	4	6	10	2	-2	2	0	0
Denis Cyr	RW	9	5	3	8	0	1	0	0	1
Jim Pavese	D	51	2	5	7	69	-4	0	0	1
Terry Johnson	D	74	0	7	7	120	13	0	0	0
Alain Lemieux	C	19	4	2	6	0	2	0	0	1
Dwight Schofield	D	43	1	4	5	184	-4	0	0	0
Luc Dufour	LW	23	1	3	4	18	-8	0	0	0
Brian Benning	D	4	0	2	2	0	-6	0	0	0
Perry Ganchar	RW	7	0	2	2	0	0	0	0	0
Mike Liut	G	32	0	1	1	4	0	0	0	0
Rick Wamsley	G	40	0	1	1	0	0	0	0	0
Rick Heinz	G	2	0	0	0	0	0	0	0	0
Greg Millen	G	10	0	0	0	0	0	0	0	0

Goaltending

Player	MIN	GP	W	L	T	GA	GAA	SO
Rick Wamsley	2319	40	23	12	5	126	3.26	0
Mike Liut	1869	32	12	12	6	119	3.82	1
Greg Millen	607	10	2	7	1	35	3.46	0
Rick Heinz	70	2	0	0	0	3	2.57	0
Team:	4865	80	37	31	12	283	3.49	1

=== Playoffs ===
Scoring

Player	Pos	GP	G	A	Pts	PIM	+/-	PPG	SHG	GWG
Rob Ramage	D	3	1	3	4	6	-3	0	1	0
Brian Sutter	LW	3	2	1	3	2	-1	2	0	0
Doug Gilmour	C	3	1	1	2	2	-4	0	0	0
Jorgen Pettersson	LW	3	1	1	2	0	0	0	0	0
Bernie Federko	C	3	0	2	2	4	1	0	0	0
Mark Johnson	C	3	0	1	1	0	1	0	0	0
Rik Wilson	D	2	0	1	1	0	1	0	0	0
Perry Anderson	LW	3	0	0	0	7	-1	0	0	0
Dave Barr	RW	2	0	0	0	2	0	0	0	0
Tim Bothwell	D	3	0	0	0	2	-3	0	0	0
Denis Cyr	RW	3	0	0	0	0	-1	0	0	0
Gilbert Delorme	D	3	0	0	0	0	-2	0	0	0
Luc Dufour	LW	1	0	0	0	2	-1	0	0	0
Pat Hickey	LW	3	0	0	0	2	-2	0	0	0
Terry Johnson	D	3	0	0	0	19	-3	0	0	0
Craig Levie	D	1	0	0	0	0	2	0	0	0
Greg Millen	G	1	0	0	0	2	0	0	0	0
Joe Mullen	RW	3	0	0	0	0	1	0	0	0
Greg Paslawski	RW	3	0	0	0	2	-5	0	0	0
Jim Pavese	D	1	0	0	0	5	0	0	0	0
Mark Reeds	RW	3	0	0	0	0	0	0	0	0
Dwight Schofield	D	2	0	0	0	15	0	0	0	0
Rick Wamsley	G	2	0	0	0	0	0	0	0	0

Goaltending

Player	MIN	GP	W	L	GA	GAA	SO
Greg Millen	60	1	0	1	2	2.00	0
Rick Wamsley	120	2	0	2	7	3.50	0
Team:	180	3	0	3	9	3.00	0

Note:

Pos = Position;GP = Games played; G = Goals; A = Assists; Pts = Points; PIM = Penalty minutes; +/- = Plus/minus; PPG = Power-play goals; SHG = Short-handed goals; GWG = Game-winning goals
Pos = Position;GP = Games played; Min, TOI = Minutes played; W = Wins; L = Losses; T,T/OT = Ties; OTL = Overtime losses; GA = Goals-against; GAA = Goals-against average; SO = Shutouts; SA = Shots against; SV = Shots saved;SV% = Save percentage;

== Draft picks ==
St. Louis's draft picks at the 1984 NHL entry draft held at the Montreal Forum in Montreal.

Round	#	Player	Nationality	College/Junior/Club team (League)
2	26	Brian Benning	Canada	Portland Winter Hawks (WHL)
2	32	Tony Hrkac	Canada	Orillia Travelways (OJHL)
3	50	Toby Ducolon	United States	Bellows Free Academy (USHS-VT)
3	53	Robert Dirk	Canada	Regina Pats (WHL)
3	56	Alan Perry	United States	Mount St. Charles Academy (USHS-RI)
4	71	Graham Herring	Canada	Longueuil Chevaliers (QMJHL)
5	92	Scott Paluch	United States	Franklin Park Jets (USHL)
6	113	Steve Tuttle	Canada	Richmond Sockeyes (BCJHL)
7	134	Cliff Ronning	Canada	New Westminster Bruins (WHL)
8	148	Don Porter	Canada	Michigan Technological University (WCHA)
8	155	Jim Vesey	United States	Columbus High School (USHS-MA)
9	176	Daniel Jomphe	Canada	Granby Bisons (QMJHL)
10	196	Tom Tilley	Canada	Orillia Travelways (OPJHL)
11	217	Mark Cupolo	Canada	Guelph Platers (OHL)
12	237	Mark Lanigan	United States	Waterloo Blackhawks (USHL)

== See also ==
- 1984–85 NHL season
