= 1984–85 Minnesota North Stars season =

National Hockey League team season

1984–85 Minnesota North Stars
- Division: 4th Norris
- Conference: 8th Campbell
- 1984–85 record: 25–43–12
- Home record: 14–19–7
- Road record: 11–24–5
- Goals for: 268
- Goals against: 321

Team information
- General manager: Lou Nanne
- Coach: Bill Mahoney; Glen Sonmor
- Captain: Craig Hartsburg
- Alternate captains: None
- Arena: Met Center

Team leaders
- Goals: Steve Payne (29)
- Assists: Dennis Maruk (41)
- Points: Brian Bellows (62)
- Penalty minutes: Harold Snepsts (232)
- Wins: Don Beaupre; Gilles Meloche (10)
- Goals against average: Don Beaupre (3.70)

The 1984–85 Minnesota North Stars season was the North Stars' 18th season.

Coached by Bill Mahoney (3–8–2) and Glen Sonmor (22–35–10), the team compiled a record of 25–43–12 for 62 points, to finish the regular season 4th in the Norris Division. In the playoffs they won the division semi-finals 3–0 over the St. Louis Blues, but lost the division finals 4–2 to the Chicago Black Hawks.

== Regular season ==
=== Final standings ===
Norris Division
	GP	W	L	T	GF	GA	Pts
**St. Louis Blues**	80	37	31	12	299	288	86
**Chicago Black Hawks**	80	38	35	7	309	299	83
**Detroit Red Wings**	80	27	41	12	313	357	66
**Minnesota North Stars**	80	25	43	12	268	321	62
Toronto Maple Leafs	80	20	52	8	253	358	48

Note: GP = Games played, W = Wins, L = Losses, T = Ties, Pts = Points, GF = Goals for, GA = Goals against
Note: Teams that qualified for the playoffs are highlighted in bold.

=== Record vs. opponents ===
Norris Division record vs. opponents

==== Vs. Campbell Conference ====
**Vs. Norris Division**

1984–85 NHL records
Team	**CHI**	**DET**	**MIN**	**STL**	**TOR**	**Total**
Chicago	—	3−3−2	4−3−1	3−4−1	6−1−1	**16−11−5**
Detroit	3−3−2	—	3−2−3	1−6−1	5−3	**12−14−6**
Minnesota	3−4−1	2−3−3	—	1−6−1	6−2	**12−15−5**
St. Louis	4−3−1	6−1−1	6−1−1	—	4−3−1	**20−8−4**
Toronto	1−6−1	3−5	2−6	3−4−1	—	**9−21−2**

**Vs. Smythe Division**

1984–85 NHL records
Team	**CGY**	**EDM**	**LAK**	**VAN**	**WIN**	**Total**
Chicago	2−1	0−3	2−0−1	2−1	1−1−1	**7−6−2**
Detroit	1−2	0−3	1−2	2−1	0−2−1	**4−10−1**
Minnesota	0−1−2	0−3	1−1−1	1−1−1	1−2	**3−8−4**
St. Louis	3−0	0−3	2−1	3−0	1−0−2	**9−4−2**
Toronto	0−3	0−2−1	1−2	1−1−1	0−3	**2−11−2**

**Vs. Wales Conference**

**Vs. Adams Division**

1984–85 NHL records
Team	**BOS**	**BUF**	**HFD**	**MTL**	**QUE**	**Total**
Chicago	3−0	0−3	1−2	2−1	0−3	**6−9−0**
Detroit	0−3	1−1−1	1−2	1−1−1	2−1	**5−8−2**
Minnesota	0−3	0−3	2−1	2−1	0−3	**4−11−0**
St. Louis	0−1−2	2−1	1−2	0−2−1	1−2	**4−8−3**
Toronto	1−2	1−2	1−2	3−0	0−1−2	**6−7−2**

**Vs. Patrick Division**

1984–85 NHL records
Team	**NJD**	**NYI**	**NYR**	**PHI**	**PIT**	**WSH**	**Total**
Chicago	3−0	0−3	3−0	1−2	2−1	0−3	**9−9−0**
Detroit	1−1−1	1−2	2−1	0−2−1	1−1−1	1−2	**6−9−3**
Minnesota	1−1−1	1−1−1	2−1	0−3	2−1	0−2−1	**6−9−3**
St. Louis	2−0−1	0−3	0−2−1	0−3	2−1	0−2−1	**4−11−3**
Toronto	0−3	1−2	0−2−1	1−2	1−2	0−2−1	**3−13−2**

== Schedule and results ==
1984–85 regular season
October

Game	Result	Date	Score	Opponent	Record
1	L	October 11, 1984	0–1 OT	Toronto Maple Leafs (1984–85)	0–1–0
2	W	October 13, 1984	3–1	New York Rangers (1984–85)	1–1–0
3	W	October 14, 1984	3–1	@ New York Rangers (1984–85)	2–1–0
4	L	October 18, 1984	5–7	Edmonton Oilers (1984–85)	2–2–0
5	L	October 20, 1984	2–4	@ Montreal Canadiens (1984–85)	2–3–0
6	L	October 21, 1984	6–8	@ Buffalo Sabres (1984–85)	2–4–0
7	L	October 23, 1984	2–7	Philadelphia Flyers (1984–85)	2–5–0
8	L	October 27, 1984	3–5	Hartford Whalers (1984–85)	2–6–0
9	T	October 30, 1984	5–5 OT	Chicago Black Hawks (1984–85)	2–6–1

November

Game	Result	Date	Score	Opponent	Record
10	T	November 2, 1984	2–2 OT	@ New Jersey Devils (1984–85)	2–6–2
11	L	November 3, 1984	1–5	@ Philadelphia Flyers (1984–85)	2–7–2
12	W	November 5, 1984	5–3	Toronto Maple Leafs (1984–85)	3–7–2
13	L	November 7, 1984	6–9	Buffalo Sabres (1984–85)	3–8–2
14	T	November 10, 1984	5–5 OT	Vancouver Canucks (1984–85)	3–8–3
15	W	November 11, 1984	7–6	@ Toronto Maple Leafs (1984–85)	4–8–3
16	T	November 13, 1984	3–3 OT	@ Washington Capitals (1984–85)	4–8–4
17	L	November 15, 1984	1–6	@ New York Islanders (1984–85)	4–9–4
18	T	November 17, 1984	3–3 OT	Detroit Red Wings (1984–85)	4–9–5
19	W	November 21, 1984	7–1	Toronto Maple Leafs (1984–85)	5–9–5
20	W	November 23, 1984	5–4 OT	New Jersey Devils (1984–85)	6–9–5
21	W	November 24, 1984	4–2	@ Toronto Maple Leafs (1984–85)	7–9–5
22	L	November 27, 1984	2–3	@ New Jersey Devils (1984–85)	7–10–5
23	W	November 28, 1984	4–2	@ Hartford Whalers (1984–85)	8–10–5

December

Game	Result	Date	Score	Opponent	Record
24	L	December 1, 1984	4–8	Calgary Flames (1984–85)	8–11–5
25	T	December 4, 1984	2–2 OT	Los Angeles Kings (1984–85)	8–11–6
26	L	December 7, 1984	3–6	@ Edmonton Oilers (1984–85)	8–12–6
27	L	December 9, 1984	2–4	@ Winnipeg Jets (1984–85)	8–13–6
28	L	December 10, 1984	3–4	Detroit Red Wings (1984–85)	8–14–6
29	L	December 12, 1984	2–3	Washington Capitals (1984–85)	8–15–6
30	L	December 15, 1984	3–5	Chicago Black Hawks (1984–85)	8–16–6
31	W	December 16, 1984	5–3	@ Chicago Black Hawks (1984–85)	9–16–6
32	L	December 19, 1984	1–4	@ St. Louis Blues (1984–85)	9–17–6
33	W	December 22, 1984	5–4	@ Detroit Red Wings (1984–85)	10–17–6
34	L	December 23, 1984	3–4 OT	@ Boston Bruins (1984–85)	10–18–6
35	W	December 26, 1984	4–0	Winnipeg Jets (1984–85)	11–18–6
36	L	December 29, 1984	3–5	Boston Bruins (1984–85)	11–19–6
37	W	December 31, 1984	4–3	New York Islanders (1984–85)	12–19–6

January

Game	Result	Date	Score	Opponent	Record
38	W	January 3, 1985	8–3	@ Los Angeles Kings (1984–85)	13–19–6
39	T	January 5, 1985	4–4 OT	@ Calgary Flames (1984–85)	13–19–7
40	L	January 9, 1985	3–4	@ Chicago Black Hawks (1984–85)	13–20–7
41	L	January 10, 1985	3–5	St. Louis Blues (1984–85)	13–21–7
42	W	January 12, 1985	5–4	Hartford Whalers (1984–85)	14–21–7
43	L	January 14, 1985	3–6	@ Washington Capitals (1984–85)	14–22–7
44	T	January 16, 1985	4–4 OT	St. Louis Blues (1984–85)	14–22–8
45	L	January 19, 1985	1–4	Philadelphia Flyers (1984–85)	14–23–8
46	L	January 21, 1985	2–7	@ Chicago Black Hawks (1984–85)	14–24–8
47	W	January 23, 1985	4–3	Pittsburgh Penguins (1984–85)	15–24–8
48	T	January 26, 1985	4–4 OT	Detroit Red Wings (1984–85)	15–24–9
49	L	January 27, 1985	2–3	@ New York Rangers (1984–85)	15–25–9
50	T	January 29, 1985	4–4 OT	@ New York Islanders (1984–85)	15–25–10

February

Game	Result	Date	Score	Opponent	Record
51	W	February 2, 1985	5–2	@ Toronto Maple Leafs (1984–85)	16–25–10
52	L	February 3, 1985	1–5	@ Quebec Nordiques (1984–85)	16–26–10
53	L	February 6, 1985	1–3	Buffalo Sabres (1984–85)	16–27–10
54	L	February 8, 1985	3–5	Edmonton Oilers (1984–85)	16–28–10
55	L	February 9, 1985	2–4	@ St. Louis Blues (1984–85)	16–29–10
56	T	February 14, 1985	5–5 OT	@ Detroit Red Wings (1984–85)	16–29–11
57	L	February 16, 1985	4–6	@ St. Louis Blues (1984–85)	16–30–11
58	L	February 17, 1985	3–4	Quebec Nordiques (1984–85)	16–31–11
59	L	February 20, 1985	2–3	Boston Bruins (1984–85)	16–32–11
60	W	February 22, 1985	4–1	Chicago Black Hawks (1984–85)	17–32–11
61	L	February 23, 1985	1–3	Pittsburgh Penguins (1984–85)	17–33–11
62	W	February 25, 1985	5–4	@ Pittsburgh Penguins (1984–85)	18–33–11
63	L	February 27, 1985	1–6	@ Toronto Maple Leafs (1984–85)	18–34–11

March

Game	Result	Date	Score	Opponent	Record
64	L	March 1, 1985	2–6	@ Detroit Red Wings (1984–85)	18–35–11
65	W	March 2, 1985	5–2	Detroit Red Wings (1984–85)	19–35–11
66	W	March 4, 1985	4–3	Montreal Canadiens (1984–85)	20–35–11
67	L	March 6, 1985	4–5	Chicago Black Hawks (1984–85)	20–36–11
68	W	March 9, 1985	4–1	St. Louis Blues (1984–85)	21–36–11
69	W	March 10, 1985	3–2	@ Chicago Black Hawks (1984–85)	22–36–11
70	L	March 13, 1985	0–8	@ Quebec Nordiques (1984–85)	22–37–11
71	W	March 16, 1985	4–2	@ Montreal Canadiens (1984–85)	23–37–11
72	T	March 18, 1985	4–4 OT	Calgary Flames (1984–85)	23–37–12
73	L	March 20, 1985	2–5	@ Winnipeg Jets (1984–85)	23–38–12
74	L	March 23, 1985	2–4	@ St. Louis Blues (1984–85)	23–39–12
75	W	March 25, 1985	5–3	Vancouver Canucks (1984–85)	24–39–12
76	L	March 26, 1985	1–5	@ Detroit Red Wings (1984–85)	24–40–12
77	L	March 30, 1985	2–3	@ Los Angeles Kings (1984–85)	24–41–12
78	L	March 31, 1985	2–3	@ Vancouver Canucks (1984–85)	24–42–12

April

Game	Result	Date	Score	Opponent	Record
79	W	April 3, 1985	9–7	Toronto Maple Leafs (1984–85)	25–42–12
80	L	April 6, 1985	3–4	St. Louis Blues (1984–85)	25–43–12

Legend: Win (2 points) Loss (0 points) Tie (1 point)

== Draft picks ==
Minnesota's draft picks at the 1984 NHL entry draft held at the Montreal Forum in Montreal.

Round	#	Player	Nationality	College/Junior/Club team (League)
1	13	David Quinn	United States	Kent School (Connecticut)
3	46	Ken Hodge Jr.	United States	St. John's School (USHS-MA)
4	76	Miroslav Maly	Czechoslovakia	SV Bayreuth (West Germany)
5	89	Jiri Poner	Czechoslovakia	Landshut (West Germany)
5	97	Kari Takko	Finland	Assat (Finland)
6	118	Gary McColgan	Canada	Oshawa Generals (OHL)
7	139	Vladimir Kyhos	Czechoslovakia	CHZ Litvinov (Czechoslovakia)
8	160	Darin MacInnis	United States	Kent School (USHS-CT)
9	181	Duane Wahlin	United States	Johnson High School (USHS-MN)
10	201	Michael Orn	United States	Stillwater High School (USHS-MN)
11	222	Tom Terwilliger	United States	Edina High School (USHS-MN)
12	242	Mike Nightengale	United States	Simley High School (USHS-MN)

== See also ==
- 1984–85 NHL season
