= 1984–85 Detroit Red Wings season =

National Hockey League team season

1984–85 Detroit Red Wings
- Division: 3rd Norris
- Conference: 7th Campbell
- 1984–85 record: 27–41–12
- Home record: 19–14–7
- Road record: 8–27–5
- Goals for: 313
- Goals against: 357

Team information
- General manager: Jim Devellano
- Coach: Nick Polano
- Captain: Danny Gare
- Alternate captains: None
- Arena: Joe Louis Arena

Team leaders
- Goals: John Ogrodnick (55)
- Assists: Steve Yzerman (59)
- Points: John Ogrodnick (105)
- Penalty minutes: Danny Gare; Tiger Williams (163)
- Wins: Greg Stefan (21)
- Goals against average: Eddie Mio (4.32)

The 1984–85 Detroit Red Wings season was the Red Wings' 53rd season, the franchise's 59th.

== Regular season ==
On October 26, 1984, Paul Coffey of the Edmonton Oilers would be the last defenseman in the 20th Century to score four goals in one game. It occurred in a game versus the Detroit Red Wings.

=== Final standings ===
Norris Division
	GP	W	L	T	GF	GA	Pts
**St. Louis Blues**	80	37	31	12	299	288	86
**Chicago Black Hawks**	80	38	35	7	309	299	83
**Detroit Red Wings**	80	27	41	12	313	357	66
**Minnesota North Stars**	80	25	43	12	268	321	62
Toronto Maple Leafs	80	20	52	8	253	358	48

Note: GP = Games played, W = Wins, L = Losses, T = Ties, Pts = Points, GF = Goals for, GA = Goals against
Note: Teams that qualified for the playoffs are highlighted in bold.

=== Record vs. opponents ===
Norris Division record vs. opponents

==== Vs. Campbell Conference ====
**Vs. Norris Division**

1984–85 NHL records
Team	**CHI**	**DET**	**MIN**	**STL**	**TOR**	**Total**
Chicago	—	3−3−2	4−3−1	3−4−1	6−1−1	**16−11−5**
Detroit	3−3−2	—	3−2−3	1−6−1	5−3	**12−14−6**
Minnesota	3−4−1	2−3−3	—	1−6−1	6−2	**12−15−5**
St. Louis	4−3−1	6−1−1	6−1−1	—	4−3−1	**20−8−4**
Toronto	1−6−1	3−5	2−6	3−4−1	—	**9−21−2**

**Vs. Smythe Division**

1984–85 NHL records
Team	**CGY**	**EDM**	**LAK**	**VAN**	**WIN**	**Total**
Chicago	2−1	0−3	2−0−1	2−1	1−1−1	**7−6−2**
Detroit	1−2	0−3	1−2	2−1	0−2−1	**4−10−1**
Minnesota	0−1−2	0−3	1−1−1	1−1−1	1−2	**3−8−4**
St. Louis	3−0	0−3	2−1	3−0	1−0−2	**9−4−2**
Toronto	0−3	0−2−1	1−2	1−1−1	0−3	**2−11−2**

**Vs. Wales Conference**

**Vs. Adams Division**

1984–85 NHL records
Team	**BOS**	**BUF**	**HFD**	**MTL**	**QUE**	**Total**
Chicago	3−0	0−3	1−2	2−1	0−3	**6−9−0**
Detroit	0−3	1−1−1	1−2	1−1−1	2−1	**5−8−2**
Minnesota	0−3	0−3	2−1	2−1	0−3	**4−11−0**
St. Louis	0−1−2	2−1	1−2	0−2−1	1−2	**4−8−3**
Toronto	1−2	1−2	1−2	3−0	0−1−2	**6−7−2**

**Vs. Patrick Division**

1984–85 NHL records
Team	**NJD**	**NYI**	**NYR**	**PHI**	**PIT**	**WSH**	**Total**
Chicago	3−0	0−3	3−0	1−2	2−1	0−3	**9−9−0**
Detroit	1−1−1	1−2	2−1	0−2−1	1−1−1	1−2	**6−9−3**
Minnesota	1−1−1	1−1−1	2−1	0−3	2−1	0−2−1	**6−9−3**
St. Louis	2−0−1	0−3	0−2−1	0−3	2−1	0−2−1	**4−11−3**
Toronto	0−3	1−2	0−2−1	1−2	1−2	0−2−1	**3−13−2**

== Schedule and results ==
1984–85 regular season
October

Game	Result	Date	Score	Opponent	Record
1	L	October 11, 1984	3–7	@ Chicago Black Hawks (1984–85)	0–1–0
2	W	October 13, 1984	4–1	New Jersey Devils (1984–85)	1–1–0
3	L	October 14, 1984	4–6	@ Buffalo Sabres (1984–85)	1–2–0
4	L	October 17, 1984	4–6	New York Islanders (1984–85)	1–3–0
5	L	October 18, 1984	3–7	@ Hartford Whalers (1984–85)	1–4–0
6	W	October 20, 1984	7–4	Chicago Black Hawks (1984–85)	2–4–0
7	L	October 24, 1984	1–6	@ Toronto Maple Leafs (1984–85)	2–5–0
8	W	October 26, 1984	7–3	Buffalo Sabres (1984–85)	3–5–0
9	L	October 30, 1984	3–4	@ Pittsburgh Penguins (1984–85)	3–6–0

November

Game	Result	Date	Score	Opponent	Record
10	L	November 1, 1984	5–9	Calgary Flames (1984–85)	3–7–0
11	T	November 2, 1984	3–3 OT	Winnipeg Jets (1984–85)	3–7–1
12	W	November 6, 1984	4–2	Montreal Canadiens (1984–85)	4–7–1
13	L	November 8, 1984	2–5	@ Boston Bruins (1984–85)	4–8–1
14	L	November 10, 1984	2–4	Boston Bruins (1984–85)	4–9–1
15	L	November 13, 1984	4–5 OT	@ Calgary Flames (1984–85)	4–10–1
16	L	November 14, 1984	2–3	@ Vancouver Canucks (1984–85)	4–11–1
17	T	November 17, 1984	3–3 OT	@ Minnesota North Stars (1984–85)	4–11–2
18	W	November 21, 1984	4–2	Hartford Whalers (1984–85)	5–11–2
19	W	November 23, 1984	6–5	Toronto Maple Leafs (1984–85)	6–11–2
20	L	November 24, 1984	4–6	@ Montreal Canadiens (1984–85)	6–12–2
21	T	November 28, 1984	3–3 OT	Montreal Canadiens (1984–85)	6–12–3
22	L	November 30, 1984	3–5	St. Louis Blues (1984–85)	6–13–3

December

Game	Result	Date	Score	Opponent	Record
23	L	December 1, 1984	5–10	@ St. Louis Blues (1984–85)	6–14–3
24	W	December 4, 1984	7–6	Toronto Maple Leafs (1984–85)	7–14–3
25	W	December 5, 1984	4–2	@ Toronto Maple Leafs (1984–85)	8–14–3
26	W	December 7, 1984	5–4	Chicago Black Hawks (1984–85)	9–14–3
27	L	December 9, 1984	0–4	@ Washington Capitals (1984–85)	9–15–3
28	W	December 10, 1984	4–3	@ Minnesota North Stars (1984–85)	10–15–3
29	L	December 12, 1984	1–5	@ Chicago Black Hawks (1984–85)	10–16–3
30	T	December 14, 1984	4–4 OT	@ Buffalo Sabres (1984–85)	10–16–4
31	L	December 16, 1984	2–5	@ Winnipeg Jets (1984–85)	10–17–4
32	W	December 20, 1984	5–4	Quebec Nordiques (1984–85)	11–17–4
33	L	December 22, 1984	4–5	Minnesota North Stars (1984–85)	11–18–4
34	W	December 26, 1984	5–2	New York Rangers (1984–85)	12–18–4
35	W	December 28, 1984	4–3	@ Calgary Flames (1984–85)	13–18–4
36	L	December 29, 1984	3–6	@ Edmonton Oilers (1984–85)	13–19–4
37	T	December 31, 1984	4–4 OT	Pittsburgh Penguins (1984–85)	13–19–5

January

Game	Result	Date	Score	Opponent	Record
38	L	January 2, 1985	2–7	New York Islanders (1984–85)	13–20–5
39	L	January 3, 1985	2–6	@ Hartford Whalers (1984–85)	13–21–5
40	L	January 5, 1985	3–5	Los Angeles Kings (1984–85)	13–22–5
41	L	January 8, 1985	2–4	Washington Capitals (1984–85)	13–23–5
42	L	January 12, 1985	3–4	@ Boston Bruins (1984–85)	13–24–5
43	L	January 13, 1985	2–5	@ Quebec Nordiques (1984–85)	13–25–5
44	T	January 16, 1985	1–1 OT	Philadelphia Flyers (1984–85)	13–25–6
45	L	January 17, 1985	5–7	@ Philadelphia Flyers (1984–85)	13–26–6
46	L	January 19, 1985	5–8	Winnipeg Jets (1984–85)	13–27–6
47	L	January 21, 1985	3–6	St. Louis Blues (1984–85)	13–28–6
48	W	January 22, 1985	5–4	@ New York Islanders (1984–85)	14–28–6
49	L	January 24, 1985	1–3	@ New York Rangers (1984–85)	14–29–6
50	T	January 26, 1985	4–4 OT	@ Minnesota North Stars (1984–85)	14–29–7
51	W	January 29, 1985	4–3	Washington Capitals (1984–85)	15–29–7
52	L	January 31, 1985	2–3	@ St. Louis Blues (1984–85)	15–30–7

February

Game	Result	Date	Score	Opponent	Record
53	W	February 2, 1985	6–3	Quebec Nordiques (1984–85)	16–30–7
54	T	February 3, 1985	5–5 OT	@ New Jersey Devils (1984–85)	16–30–8
55	T	February 7, 1985	5–5 OT	St. Louis Blues (1984–85)	16–30–9
56	L	February 9, 1985	5–6	Edmonton Oilers (1984–85)	16–31–9
57	T	February 14, 1985	5–5 OT	Minnesota North Stars (1984–85)	16–31–10
58	W	February 16, 1985	7–4	Chicago Black Hawks (1984–85)	17–31–10
59	T	February 17, 1985	4–4 OT	@ Chicago Black Hawks (1984–85)	17–31–11
60	W	February 20, 1985	3–2	St. Louis Blues (1984–85)	18–31–11
61	L	February 23, 1985	2–4	Toronto Maple Leafs (1984–85)	18–32–11
62	L	February 24, 1985	2–3	@ Chicago Black Hawks (1984–85)	18–33–11
63	W	February 27, 1985	11–5	Vancouver Canucks (1984–85)	19–33–11

March

Game	Result	Date	Score	Opponent	Record
64	W	March 1, 1985	6–2	Minnesota North Stars (1984–85)	20–33–11
65	L	March 2, 1985	2–5	@ Minnesota North Stars (1984–85)	20–34–11
66	W	March 6, 1985	5–3	@ Toronto Maple Leafs (1984–85)	21–34–11
67	L	March 9, 1985	5–8	New Jersey Devils (1984–85)	21–35–11
68	L	March 10, 1985	2–6	@ St. Louis Blues (1984–85)	21–36–11
69	L	March 13, 1985	6–7	@ Edmonton Oilers (1984–85)	21–37–11
70	W	March 15, 1985	6–5	@ Vancouver Canucks (1984–85)	22–37–11
71	L	March 16, 1985	3–8	@ Los Angeles Kings (1984–85)	22–38–11
72	W	March 20, 1985	8–6	Los Angeles Kings (1984–85)	23–38–11
73	W	March 22, 1985	5–3	New York Rangers (1984–85)	24–38–11
74	L	March 24, 1985	3–5	Toronto Maple Leafs (1984–85)	24–39–11
75	W	March 26, 1985	5–1	Minnesota North Stars (1984–85)	25–39–11
76	L	March 28, 1985	1–3	@ Philadelphia Flyers (1984–85)	25–40–11
77	W	March 30, 1985	9–3	@ Toronto Maple Leafs (1984–85)	26–40–11

April

Game	Result	Date	Score	Opponent	Record
78	W	April 3, 1985	3–2	@ Pittsburgh Penguins (1984–85)	27–40–11
79	T	April 6, 1985	2–2 OT	Chicago Black Hawks (1984–85)	27–40–12
80	L	April 7, 1985	5–6 OT	@ St. Louis Blues (1984–85)	27–41–12

Legend: Win (2 points) Loss (0 points) Tie (1 point)

== Playoffs ==
They made it into the playoffs again and got swept in the first round in a best of five series by Chicago in 3 games, or 0–3.

== Player statistics ==
=== Regular season ===
Scoring

Player	Pos	GP	G	A	Pts	PIM	+/-	PPG	SHG	GWG
John Ogrodnick	LW	79	55	50	105	30	1	15	1	6
Ron Duguay	C/RW	80	38	51	89	51	-16	11	3	4
Steve Yzerman	C	80	30	59	89	58	-17	9	0	3
Reed Larson	D	77	17	45	62	139	7	7	0	0
Kelly Kisio	C	75	20	41	61	56	2	5	0	0
Danny Gare	RW	71	27	29	56	163	5	3	0	3
Ivan Boldirev	C	75	19	30	49	16	-25	11	0	3
Brad Park	D	67	13	30	43	53	-15	6	0	0
Dwight Foster	RW	50	16	16	32	56	12	0	3	0
Bob Manno	D	74	10	22	32	32	0	0	3	1
Randy Ladouceur	D	80	3	27	30	108	3	1	0	1
Darryl Sittler	C	61	11	16	27	37	-10	4	0	2
Lane Lambert	RW	69	14	11	25	104	-3	0	0	1
John Barrett	D	71	6	19	25	117	-15	0	0	1
Greg Smith	D	73	2	18	20	117	-26	0	0	0
Gerard Gallant	LW	32	6	12	18	66	9	0	0	2
Tiger Williams	LW	55	3	8	11	158	-16	0	0	0
Larry Trader	D	40	3	7	10	39	11	1	0	0
Claude Loiselle	C	30	8	1	9	45	-5	0	0	0
Frantisek Cernik	W	49	5	4	9	13	-7	0	0	0
Colin Campbell	D	57	1	5	6	124	-14	0	0	0
Milan Chalupa	D	14	0	5	5	6	4	0	0	0
Pierre Aubry	LW	25	2	2	4	33	-1	0	0	0
Corrado Micalef	G	36	0	3	3	6	0	0	0	0
Dave Silk	RW	12	2	0	2	10	-6	0	0	0
Greg Stefan	G	46	0	2	2	23	0	0	0	0
Joe Kocur	RW	17	1	0	1	64	-4	0	0	0
Brad Smith	RW	1	1	0	1	5	0	0	0	0
Shawn Burr	LW/C	9	0	0	0	2	-4	0	0	0
Eddie Mio	G	7	0	0	0	2	0	0	0	0
Rick Zombo	D	1	0	0	0	0	-3	0	0	0

Goaltending

Player	MIN	GP	W	L	T	GA	GAA	SO
Greg Stefan	2635	46	21	19	3	190	4.33	0
Corrado Micalef	1856	36	5	19	7	136	4.40	0
Eddie Mio	376	7	1	3	2	27	4.31	0
Team:	4867	80	27	41	12	353	4.35	0

=== Playoffs ===
Scoring

Player	Pos	GP	G	A	Pts	PIM	PPG	SHG	GWG
Steve Yzerman	C	3	2	1	3	2	0	0	0
Reed Larson	D	3	1	2	3	20	0	0	0
John Ogrodnick	LW	3	1	1	2	0	0	0	0
Kelly Kisio	C	3	0	2	2	2	0	0	0
Claude Loiselle	C	3	0	2	2	0	0	0	0
Darryl Sittler	C	2	0	2	2	0	0	0	0
Ron Duguay	C/RW	3	1	0	1	7	1	0	0
Joe Kocur	RW	3	1	0	1	5	0	0	0
Randy Ladouceur	D	3	1	0	1	0	0	0	0
Bob Manno	D	3	1	0	1	0	0	0	0
John Barrett	D	3	0	1	1	11	0	0	0
Ivan Boldirev	C	2	0	1	1	0	0	0	0
Brad Smith	RW	3	0	1	1	5	0	0	0
Dwight Foster	RW	3	0	0	0	0	0	0	0
Gerard Gallant	LW	3	0	0	0	11	0	0	0
Danny Gare	RW	2	0	0	0	10	0	0	0
Corrado Micalef	G	2	0	0	0	0	0	0	0
Brad Park	D	3	0	0	0	11	0	0	0
Greg Smith	D	3	0	0	0	7	0	0	0
Greg Stefan	G	3	0	0	0	0	0	0	0
Larry Trader	D	3	0	0	0	0	0	0	0

Goaltending

Player	MIN	GP	W	L	GA	GAA	SO
Corrado Micalef	42	2	0	0	6	8.57	0
Greg Stefan	138	3	0	3	17	7.39	0
Team:	180	3	0	3	23	7.67	0

Note: GP = Games played; G = Goals; A = Assists; Pts = Points; +/- = Plus-minus PIM = Penalty minutes; PPG = Power-play goals; SHG = Short-handed goals; GWG = Game-winning goals;
MIN = Minutes played; W = Wins; L = Losses; T = Ties; GA = Goals against; GAA = Goals-against average; SO = Shutouts;

== Draft picks ==
Detroit's draft picks at the 1984 NHL entry draft held at the Montreal Forum in Montreal.

Round	#	Player	Nationality	College/Junior/Club team (League)
1	7	Shawn Burr	Canada	Kitchener Rangers (OHL)
2	28	Doug Houda	Canada	Calgary Wranglers (WHL)
3	49	Milan Chalupa	Czechoslovakia	HC Dukla Jihlava (Czechoslovakia)
5	91	Mats Lundstrom	Sweden	Skelleftea AIK (Sweden)
6	112	Randy Hansch	Canada	Victoria Cougars (WHL)
7	133	Stefan Larsson	Sweden	Frolunda (Sweden)
8	152	Lars Karlsson	Sweden	Färjestad BK (Sweden)
8	154	Urban Nordin	Sweden	Modo Hockey (Sweden)
9	175	Bill Shibicky	Canada	Michigan State University (CCHA)
10	195	Jay Rose	United States	New Preparatory School (USHS-MA)
11	216	Tim Kaiser	Canada	Guelph Platers (OHL)
12	236	Tom Nickolau	Canada	Guelph Platers (OHL)

== See also ==
- 1984–85 NHL season
