= 1984–85 Washington Capitals season =

NHL hockey team season

1984–85 Washington Capitals
- Division: 2nd Patrick
- Conference: 2nd Wales
- 1984–85 record: 46–25–9
- Home record: 27–11–2
- Road record: 19–14–7
- Goals for: 322
- Goals against: 240

Team information
- General manager: David Poile
- Coach: Bryan Murray
- Captain: Rod Langway
- Alternate captains: None
- Arena: Capital Centre

Team leaders
- Goals: Bobby Carpenter (53)
- Assists: Mike Gartner (52)
- Points: Mike Gartner (102)
- Penalty minutes: Scott Stevens (221)
- Plus/minus: Rod Langway (+36)
- Wins: Pat Riggin (28)
- Goals against average: Al Jensen (2.54)

The 1984–85 Washington Capitals season was the Washington Capitals eleventh season in the National Hockey League (NHL).

== Regular season ==
Coming off their most successful season in their NHL history (48 wins, 101 points, second place in the Patrick Division), the Capitals were expected to take over leadership of the division from the New York Islanders, whose fading dynasty was given a blow after the Oilers topped them in the 1984 Stanley Cup Final.

Instead, despite a solid start to the season, the Caps were struggling in the early going to keep up with the surprising Philadelphia Flyers. With a surge around the holidays, Washington ended up snagging first place and with the help of easy games throughout January, extended their division lead to double-digit points by the start of February.

However, the Flyers came breathing down the Caps' necks from there. On February 9, Washington led Philly by 11 points, but a last-second loss to the Flyers at the Capital Centre triggered another battle for the division title.

Although the Capitals didn't falter over the remaining games of the season, they were unable to hold off their scorching neighbors to the north — dropping a key pair of games in a home-and-home set on March 7 at the Spectrum (9–6) and March 8 at home (4–2) – which drew the clubs into a tie for first. Key losses at home to Boston and on the road at Hartford sealed their fate as the Flyers wrapped up the Patrick on March 28 with the Capitals a distant 10 points off the pace.

Despite winning 46 games and posting another 101 point campaign, the Capitals wound up 12 points behind Philly, and won only once in seven games against them (1–5–1).

That didn't take away from the career performances of Mike Gartner and Bobby Carpenter, who became the first Capitals teammates to post concurrent 50 goal seasons. Both Gartner (50) and Carpenter (53) posted career-highs in goal scoring and led a potent offense which tallied 322 times.

=== Final standings ===
Patrick Division
	GP	W	L	T	GF	GA	Pts
**Philadelphia Flyers**	80	53	20	7	348	241	113
**Washington Capitals**	80	46	25	9	322	240	101
**New York Islanders**	80	40	34	6	345	312	86
**New York Rangers**	80	26	44	10	295	345	62
New Jersey Devils	80	22	48	10	264	346	54
Pittsburgh Penguins	80	24	51	5	276	385	53

Note: GP = Games played, W = Wins, L = Losses, T = Ties, Pts = Points, GF = Goals for, GA = Goals against
Note: Teams that qualified for the playoffs are highlighted in bold.

=== Record vs. opponents ===
Patrick Division record vs. opponents

==== Vs. Wales Conference ====
**Vs. Patrick Division**

1984–85 NHL records
Team	**NJD**	**NYI**	**NYR**	**PHI**	**PIT**	**WSH**	**Total**
New Jersey	—	3−2−2	2−5	2−5	5−2	2−4−1	14−18−3
N.Y. Islanders	2−3−2	—	4−3	3−3−1	5−2	3−4	17−15−3
N.Y. Rangers	5−2	3−4	—	0−7	4−3	2−5	14−21−0
Philadelphia	5−2	3−3−1	7−0	—	5−2	5−1−1	25−8−2
Pittsburgh	2−5	2−5	3−4	2–5	—	0−6−1	9−25−1
Washington	4−2−1	4−3	5−2	1–5−1	6−0–1	—	20−13−2

**Vs. Adams Division**

1984–85 NHL records
Team	**BOS**	**BUF**	**HFD**	**MTL**	**QUE**	**Total**
New Jersey	0−3	0−3	0−3	1−1−1	1−1−1	2−11−2
N.Y. Islanders	1−2	2−1	1−1−1	1−2	0−3	5−9−1
N.Y. Rangers	0−1−2	1−1−1	0−1−2	0−2−1	1−2	2−7−6
Philadelphia	2−1	1−1−1	2−0−1	1−2	1−1−1	7−5−3
Pittsburgh	1−2	0−2−1	1−2	1−2	0−3	3−11−1
Washington	2−1	1−2	1−2	1−1−1	2−1	7−7−1

==== Vs. Campbell Conference ====
**Vs. Norris Division**

1984–85 NHL records
Team	**CHI**	**DET**	**MIN**	**STL**	**TOR**	**Total**
New Jersey	0−3	1−1−1	1−1−1	0−2−1	3−0	5−7−3
N.Y. Islanders	3−0	2−1	1−1−1	3−0	2−1	11−3−1
N.Y. Rangers	0−3	1−2	1−2	2−0−1	2−0−1	6−7−2
Philadelphia	2−1	2−0−1	3−0	3−0	2−1	12−2−1
Pittsburgh	1−2	1−1−1	1−2	1−2	2−1	6−8−1
Washington	3−0	2−1	2−0−1	2−0−1	2−0−1	11−1−3

**Vs. Smythe Division**

1984–85 NHL records
Team	**CGY**	**EDM**	**LAK**	**VAN**	**WIN**	**Total**
New Jersey	0−2−1	1−2	0−3	0−3	0−2−1	1−12−2
N.Y. Islanders	1−2	0−2−1	2−1	2−1	2−1	7−7−1
N.Y. Rangers	0−2−1	1−1−1	1−2	2−1	0−3	4−9−2
Philadelphia	2−1	3−0	1−1−1	3−0	0−3	9−5−1
Pittsburgh	2−0−1	1−1−1	0−3	2−1	1−2	6−7−2
Washington	2−1	0−1−2	2−1	3−0	1−2	8−5−2

== Schedule and results ==
1984–85 regular season
October: 4–3–2 (home: 2–2–0; road: 2–1–2)

Game	Result	Date	Score	Opponent	Record
1	T	October 11, 1984	2–2 OT	@ Philadelphia Flyers (1984–85)	0–0–1
2	L	October 13, 1984	2–4	Philadelphia Flyers (1984–85)	0–1–1
3	W	October 14, 1984	5–3	@ Chicago Black Hawks (1984–85)	1–1–1
4	W	October 16, 1984	5–3	Los Angeles Kings (1984–85)	2–1–1
5	L	October 20, 1984	5–6	New York Rangers (1984–85)	2–2–1
6	T	October 24, 1984	3–3 OT	@ Edmonton Oilers (1984–85)	2–2–2
7	L	October 25, 1984	3–5	@ Calgary Flames (1984–85)	2–3–2
8	W	October 28, 1984	5–2	@ Vancouver Canucks (1984–85)	3–3–2
9	W	October 31, 1984	4–3 OT	Calgary Flames (1984–85)	4–3–2

November: 5–5–3 (home: 3–2–1; road: 2–3–2)

Game	Result	Date	Score	Opponent	Record
10	W	November 3, 1984	6–4	New Jersey Devils (1984–85)	5–3–2
11	L	November 7, 1984	3–4	@ New York Rangers (1984–85)	5–4–2
12	L	November 9, 1984	5–8	Edmonton Oilers (1984–85)	5–5–2
13	T	November 10, 1984	2–2 OT	@ New Jersey Devils (1984–85)	5–5–3
14	T	November 13, 1984	3–3 OT	Minnesota North Stars (1984–85)	5–5–4
15	L	November 16, 1984	2–3	@ Buffalo Sabres (1984–85)	5–6–4
16	W	November 17, 1984	3–2	Buffalo Sabres (1984–85)	6–6–4
17	L	November 20, 1984	3–5	@ New York Islanders (1984–85)	6–7–4
18	T	November 21, 1984	3–3 OT	@ Pittsburgh Penguins (1984–85)	6–7–5
19	L	November 23, 1984	1–5	New York Islanders (1984–85)	6–8–5
20	W	November 25, 1984	5–0	Chicago Black Hawks (1984–85)	7–8–5
21	W	November 27, 1984	9–2	@ Quebec Nordiques (1984–85)	8–8–5
22	W	November 28, 1984	2–1	@ New York Rangers (1984–85)	9–8–5

December: 12–2–2 (home: 7–1–0; road: 5–1–2)

Game	Result	Date	Score	Opponent	Record
23	W	December 1, 1984	5–4 OT	@ Boston Bruins (1984–85)	10–8–5
24	W	December 2, 1984	9–1	Pittsburgh Penguins (1984–85)	11–8–5
25	W	December 4, 1984	4–1	New Jersey Devils (1984–85)	12–8–5
26	L	December 7, 1984	5–7	Winnipeg Jets (1984–85)	12–9–5
27	W	December 9, 1984	4–0	Detroit Red Wings (1984–85)	13–9–5
28	T	December 11, 1984	3–3 OT	@ St. Louis Blues (1984–85)	13–9–6
29	W	December 12, 1984	3–2	@ Minnesota North Stars (1984–85)	14–9–6
30	W	December 15, 1984	4–2	New York Rangers (1984–85)	15–9–6
31	W	December 16, 1984	6–3	@ New York Rangers (1984–85)	16–9–6
32	W	December 18, 1984	4–1	@ Quebec Nordiques (1984–85)	17–9–6
33	T	December 20, 1984	2–2 OT	@ Montreal Canadiens (1984–85)	17–9–7
34	W	December 22, 1984	7–5	St. Louis Blues (1984–85)	18–9–7
35	L	December 23, 1984	4–7	@ Philadelphia Flyers (1984–85)	18–10–7
36	W	December 26, 1984	6–0	Philadelphia Flyers (1984–85)	19–10–7
37	W	December 27, 1984	5–4 OT	@ New York Islanders (1984–85)	20–10–7
38	W	December 29, 1984	3–2	Hartford Whalers (1984–85)	21–10–7

January: 10–3–0 (home: 5–1–0; road: 5–2–0)

Game	Result	Date	Score	Opponent	Record
39	W	January 1, 1985	5–1	Boston Bruins (1984–85)	22–10–7
40	L	January 4, 1985	3–5	Quebec Nordiques (1984–85)	22–11–7
41	W	January 8, 1985	4–2	@ Detroit Red Wings (1984–85)	23–11–7
42	W	January 9, 1985	4–2	@ St. Louis Blues (1984–85)	24–11–7
43	L	January 12, 1985	3–5	@ New Jersey Devils (1984–85)	24–12–7
44	W	January 14, 1985	6–3	Minnesota North Stars (1984–85)	25–12–7
45	W	January 16, 1985	5–4	@ Pittsburgh Penguins (1984–85)	26–12–7
46	W	January 17, 1985	6–2	Pittsburgh Penguins (1984–85)	27–12–7
47	W	January 19, 1985	7–1	New York Rangers (1984–85)	28–12–7
48	W	January 23, 1985	3–2	@ Chicago Black Hawks (1984–85)	29–12–7
49	W	January 26, 1985	5–1	@ New York Islanders (1984–85)	30–12–7
50	W	January 27, 1985	5–2	New York Islanders (1984–85)	31–12–7
51	L	January 29, 1985	3–4	@ Detroit Red Wings (1984–85)	31–13–7

February: 7–3–2 (home: 3–1–1; road: 4–2–1)

Game	Result	Date	Score	Opponent	Record
52	T	February 1, 1985	3–3 OT	Toronto Maple Leafs (1984–85)	31–13–8
53	W	February 3, 1985	6–2	Winnipeg Jets (1984–85)	32–13–8
54	W	February 5, 1985	4–1	@ Toronto Maple Leafs (1984–85)	33–13–8
55	W	February 8, 1985	6–1	Los Angeles Kings (1984–85)	34–13–8
56	L	February 9, 1985	4–5	Philadelphia Flyers (1984–85)	34–14–8
37th All-Star Game in Calgary, Alberta
57	L	February 13, 1985	3–5	@ Winnipeg Jets (1984–85)	34–15–8
58	W	February 14, 1985	4–3	@ Calgary Flames (1984–85)	35–15–8
59	L	February 16, 1985	2–5	@ Los Angeles Kings (1984–85)	35–16–8
60	W	February 21, 1985	6–2	@ Vancouver Canucks (1984–85)	36–16–8
61	T	February 23, 1985	3–3 OT	@ Edmonton Oilers (1984–85)	36–16–9
62	W	February 26, 1985	3–2	Vancouver Canucks (1984–85)	37–16–9
63	W	February 28, 1985	5–4	@ New York Rangers (1984–85)	38–16–9

March: 6–8–0 (home: 6–4–0; road: 0–4–0)

Game	Result	Date	Score	Opponent	Record
64	L	March 2, 1985	0–4	Buffalo Sabres (1984–85)	38–17–9
65	W	March 5, 1985	4–1	New Jersey Devils (1984–85)	39–17–9
66	L	March 7, 1985	6–9	@ Philadelphia Flyers (1984–85)	39–18–9
67	L	March 8, 1985	2–4	Philadelphia Flyers (1984–85)	39–19–9
68	L	March 10, 1985	2–3	Boston Bruins (1984–85)	39–20–9
69	W	March 14, 1985	4–0	Toronto Maple Leafs (1984–85)	40–20–9
70	L	March 16, 1985	4–6	@ New York Islanders (1984–85)	40–21–9
71	W	March 19, 1985	4–1	New Jersey Devils (1984–85)	41–21–9
72	L	March 21, 1985	2–3	@ Montreal Canadiens (1984–85)	41–22–9
73	W	March 22, 1985	3–1	Montreal Canadiens (1984–85)	42–22–9
74	W	March 24, 1985	7–3	Pittsburgh Penguins (1984–85)	43–22–9
75	L	March 27, 1985	1–3	Hartford Whalers (1984–85)	43–23–9
76	L	March 28, 1985	2–3	@ New Jersey Devils (1984–85)	43–24–9
77	W	March 30, 1985	4–3	New York Islanders (1984–85)	44–24–9

April: 2–1–0 (home: 1–0–0; road: 1–1–0)

Game	Result	Date	Score	Opponent	Record
78	L	April 4, 1985	0–2	@ Hartford Whalers (1984–85)	44–25–9
79	W	April 6, 1985	7–4	@ Pittsburgh Penguins (1984–85)	45–25–9
80	W	April 7, 1985	7–3	Pittsburgh Penguins (1984–85)	46–25–9

Win (2 points) Loss (0 points) Tie (1 point)

=== Playoffs ===
1985 Stanley Cup playoffs
Patrick Division Semifinals vs. (P3) New York Islanders: N.Y. Islanders won 3–2

Game	Date Time (ET)	Visitor	Score	Home	OT	Decision	Location	Attendance	Series	Recap
1	April 10; 8:05 p.m. EST	NY Islanders	3–4	Washington	OT	Riggin	Capital Centre	18,130	1–0	
2	April 11; 8:05 p.m. EST	NY Islanders	1–2	Washington	2OT	Jensen	Capital Centre	17,993	2–0	
3	April 13; 8:05 p.m. EST	Washington	1–2	NY Islanders		Jensen	Nassau Coliseum	16,002	2–1	
4	April 14; 7:05 p.m. EST	Washington	4–6	NY Islanders		Jensen	Nassau Coliseum	16,002	2–2	
5	April 16; 8:05 p.m. EST	NY Islanders	2–1	Washington		Riggin	Capital Centre	18,130	2–3	

Win Loss

== Player statistics ==
=== Regular season ===
Scoring

Player	Pos	GP	G	A	Pts	PIM	+/-	PPG	SHG	GWG
Mike Gartner	RW	80	50	52	102	71	17	17	0	11
Bobby Carpenter	C	80	53	42	95	87	20	12	0	7
Dave Christian	RW	80	26	43	69	14	20	5	0	2
Scott Stevens	D	80	21	44	65	221	19	16	0	5
Larry Murphy	D	79	13	42	55	51	21	3	0	0
Craig Laughlin	RW	78	16	34	50	38	12	5	0	3
Alan Haworth	C	76	23	26	49	48	19	4	0	2
Bengt-Ake Gustafsson	RW	51	14	29	43	8	13	6	1	3
Gaetan Duchesne	LW	67	15	23	38	32	16	0	1	1
Mike McEwen	D	56	11	27	38	42	22	4	0	3
Doug Jarvis	C	80	9	28	37	32	19	1	1	1
Bobby Gould	RW	78	14	19	33	69	10	0	1	3
Bryan Erickson	RW	57	15	13	28	23	11	1	0	1
Rod Langway	D	79	4	22	26	54	35	0	0	1
Gary Sampson	LW	46	10	15	25	13	20	0	1	0
Darren Veitch	D	75	3	18	21	37	31	2	0	0
Greg Adams	LW	51	6	12	18	72	8	0	0	1
Lou Franceschetti	RW	22	4	7	11	45	1	0	0	1
Peter Andersson	D	57	0	10	10	21	5	0	0	0
Dean Evason	C	15	3	4	7	2	9	0	0	1
Paul Gardner	C	12	2	4	6	6	-1	2	0	0
Glen Currie	C	44	1	5	6	19	2	0	0	0
Timo Blomqvist	D	53	1	4	5	51	11	0	0	0
Jim McGeough	C	11	3	0	3	12	0	0	0	0
Andre Hidi	LW	6	2	1	3	9	2	1	0	0
Dave Shand	D	13	1	1	2	34	1	0	0	0
Mark Taylor	C	9	1	1	2	2	-1	0	0	0
Kevin Hatcher	D	2	1	0	1	0	1	0	1	0
Mikko Leinonen	C	3	0	1	1	2	1	0	0	0
Bob Mason	G	12	0	1	1	0	0	0	0	0
Pat Riggin	G	57	0	1	1	2	0	0	0	0
Al Jensen	G	14	0	0	0	6	0	0	0	0

Goaltending

Player	MIN	GP	W	L	T	GA	GAA	SO
Pat Riggin	3388	57	28	20	7	168	2.98	2
Al Jensen	803	14	10	3	1	34	2.54	1
Bob Mason	661	12	8	2	1	31	2.81	1
Team:	4852	80	46	25	9	233	2.88	4

=== Playoffs ===
Scoring

Player	Pos	GP	G	A	Pts	PIM	PPG	SHG	GWG
Mike Gartner	RW	5	4	3	7	9	1	0	1
Larry Murphy	D	5	2	3	5	0	2	0	0
Bobby Carpenter	C	5	1	4	5	8	0	0	0
Bengt-Ake Gustafsson	RW	5	1	3	4	0	1	0	0
Dave Christian	RW	5	1	1	2	0	0	0	0
Lou Franceschetti	RW	5	1	1	2	15	0	0	0
Alan Haworth	C	5	1	0	1	0	0	0	1
Doug Jarvis	C	5	1	0	1	2	0	0	0
Gaetan Duchesne	LW	5	0	1	1	7	0	0	0
Bobby Gould	RW	5	0	1	1	2	0	0	0
Rod Langway	D	5	0	1	1	6	0	0	0
Mike McEwen	D	5	0	1	1	4	0	0	0
Scott Stevens	D	5	0	1	1	20	0	0	0
Darren Veitch	D	5	0	1	1	4	0	0	0
Greg Adams	LW	5	0	0	0	9	0	0	0
Peter Andersson	D	2	0	0	0	0	0	0	0
Timo Blomqvist	D	2	0	0	0	0	0	0	0
Kevin Hatcher	D	1	0	0	0	0	0	0	0
Al Jensen	G	3	0	0	0	2	0	0	0
Craig Laughlin	RW	5	0	0	0	2	0	0	0
Mikko Leinonen	C	1	0	0	0	0	0	0	0
Pat Riggin	G	2	0	0	0	0	0	0	0
Gary Sampson	LW	4	0	0	0	0	0	0	0

Goaltending

Player	MIN	GP	W	L	GA	GAA	SO
Al Jensen	201	3	1	2	8	2.39	0
Pat Riggin	122	2	1	1	5	2.46	0
Team:	323	5	2	3	13	2.41	0

Note: GP = Games played; G = Goals; A = Assists; Pts = Points; +/- = Plus/minus; PIM = Penalty minutes; PPG=Power-play goals; SHG=Short-handed goals; GWG=Game-winning goals
MIN=Minutes played; W = Wins; L = Losses; T = Ties; GA = Goals against; GAA = Goals against average; SO = Shutouts;

== Draft picks ==
Washington's draft picks at the 1984 NHL entry draft held at the Montreal Forum in Montreal.

Round	#	Player	Nationality	College/Junior/Club team (League)
1	17	Kevin Hatcher	United States	North Bay Centennials (OHL)
2	34	Steve Leach	United States	Matignon High School (USHS-MA)
3	59	Michal Pivonka	Czechoslovakia	Poldi Kladno (Czechoslovakia)
4	80	Kris King	Canada	Peterborough Petes (OHL)
6	122	Vito Cramarossa	Canada	Toronto Marlboros (OHL)
7	143	Timo Iljina	Finland	Karpat (Finland)
8	164	Frank Joo	Canada	Regina Pats (WHL)
9	185	Jim Thomson	Canada	Toronto Marlboros (OHL)
10	205	Paul Cavallini	Canada	Henry Carr Crusaders (MetJHL)
11	225	Mikhail Tatarinov	USSR	Sokol Kiev (USSR)
12	246	Per Schederin	Sweden	Brynäs IF (Sweden)

== See also ==
- 1984–85 NHL season
