= 1984–85 Boston Bruins season =

NHL team season

1984–85 Boston Bruins
- Division: 4th Adams
- Conference: 7th Wales
- 1984–85 record: 36–34–10
- Home record: 21–15–4
- Road record: 15–19–6
- Goals for: 303
- Goals against: 287

Team information
- General manager: Harry Sinden
- Coach: Gerry Cheevers
- Captain: Terry O'Reilly
- Alternate captains: None
- Arena: Boston Garden

Team leaders
- Goals: Charlie Simmer (33)
- Assists: Ray Bourque (66)
- Points: Ray Bourque (86)
- Penalty minutes: John Blum (263)
- Wins: Pete Peeters (19)
- Goals against average: Doug Keans (3.29)

The 1984–85 Boston Bruins season was the Bruins' 61st season.

== Regular season ==
=== Final standings ===
Adams Division
	GP	W	L	T	GF	GA	Pts
**Montreal Canadiens**	80	41	27	12	309	262	94
**Quebec Nordiques**	80	41	30	9	323	275	91
**Buffalo Sabres**	80	38	28	14	290	237	90
**Boston Bruins**	80	36	34	10	303	287	82
Hartford Whalers	80	30	41	9	268	318	69

Note: GP = Games played, W = Wins, L = Losses, T = Ties, Pts = Points, GF = Goals for, GA = Goals against
Note: Teams that qualified for the playoffs are highlighted in bold.

=== Record vs. opponents ===
Adams Division record vs. opponents

==== Vs. Wales Conference ====
**Vs. Adams Division**

1984–85 NHL records
Team	**BOS**	**BUF**	**HFD**	**MTL**	**QUE**	**Total**
Boston	—	3–4–1	4–4	3–4–1	2–4–2	**12–16–4**
Buffalo	4–3–1	—	5–0–3	2–4–2	3–4–1	**14–11–7**
Hartford	4–4	0–5–3	—	2–5−1	3−5	**9–19–4**
Montreal	4–3–1	4–2–2	5–2−1	—	6–1–1	**19–8–5**
Quebec	4–2–2	4–3–1	5–3	1–6–1	—	**14–14–4**

**Vs. Patrick Division**

1984–85 NHL records
Team	**NJD**	**NYI**	**NYR**	**PHI**	**PIT**	**WSH**	**Total**
Boston	3−0	2−1	1−0–2	1−2	2−1	1−2	**10−6−2**
Buffalo	3−0	1−2	1−1−1	1−1–1	2−0–1	2−1	**10−5−3**
Hartford	3−0	1–1–1	1–0–2	0–2–1	2–1	2−1	**9−5−4**
Montreal	1−1–1	2−1	2–0–1	2−1	2−1	1−1–1	**10−5−3**
Quebec	1–1−1	3−0	2–1	1−1−1	3−0	1−2	**11−5−2**

==== Vs. Campbell Conference ====
**Vs. Norris Division**

1984–85 NHL records
Team	**CHI**	**DET**	**MIN**	**STL**	**TOR**	**Total**
Boston	0–3	3–0	3–0	1–0–2	2–1	**9–4–2**
Buffalo	3−0	1−1−1	3−0	1−2	2−1	**10−4−1**
Hartford	2–1	2−1	1−2	2–1	2–1	**9–6–0**
Montreal	1−2	1−1–1	1–2	2–0–1	0−3	**5–8–2**
Quebec	3–0	1–2	3–0	2–1	1–0–2	**10–3–2**

**Vs. Smythe Division**

1984–85 NHL records
Team	**CGY**	**EDM**	**LAK**	**VAN**	**WIN**	**Total**
Boston	0−3	1−2	1−0–2	2−1	1−2	**5−8−2**
Buffalo	3−0	0–2–1	0−2−1	0−2–1	1−2	**4−8−3**
Hartford	0−3	1–2	0–2–1	1–2	1–2	**3–11–1**
Montreal	0–2−1	2−1	2−0–1	1–2	2−1	**7−6−2**
Quebec	1−1–1	0−3	2−1	2−1	1−2	**6−8−1**

== Schedule and results ==
1984–85 regular season
October

Game	Result	Date	Score	Opponent	Record
1	W	October 11, 1984	4–3	Pittsburgh Penguins (1984–85)	1–0–0
2	L	October 13, 1984	2–3 OT	@ Hartford Whalers (1984–85)	1–1–0
3	W	October 14, 1984	4–2	Hartford Whalers (1984–85)	2–1–0
4	L	October 16, 1984	2–7	@ Edmonton Oilers (1984–85)	2–2–0
5	L	October 19, 1984	2–8	@ Calgary Flames (1984–85)	2–3–0
6	L	October 21, 1984	2–3	@ Winnipeg Jets (1984–85)	2–4–0
7	W	October 24, 1984	4–1	@ St. Louis Blues (1984–85)	3–4–0
8	W	October 27, 1984	8–3	@ New York Islanders (1984–85)	4–4–0
9	W	October 28, 1984	6–4	@ New York Rangers (1984–85)	5–4–0

November

Game	Result	Date	Score	Opponent	Record
10	W	November 1, 1984	7–1	Quebec Nordiques (1984–85)	6–4–0
11	L	November 3, 1984	1–3	@ Montreal Canadiens (1984–85)	6–5–0
12	W	November 4, 1984	6–2	New York Islanders (1984–85)	7–5–0
13	W	November 8, 1984	5–2	Detroit Red Wings (1984–85)	8–5–0
14	W	November 10, 1984	4–2	@ Detroit Red Wings (1984–85)	9–5–0
15	T	November 11, 1984	1–1 OT	St. Louis Blues (1984–85)	9–5–1
16	L	November 14, 1984	2–4	@ Buffalo Sabres (1984–85)	9–6–1
17	W	November 15, 1984	5–3	New Jersey Devils (1984–85)	10–6–1
18	L	November 17, 1984	3–5	Philadelphia Flyers (1984–85)	10–7–1
19	L	November 21, 1984	3–4	@ Philadelphia Flyers (1984–85)	10–8–1
20	L	November 24, 1984	1–2	Chicago Black Hawks (1984–85)	10–9–1
21	W	November 25, 1984	7–4	Montreal Canadiens (1984–85)	11–9–1
22	L	November 29, 1984	2–4	Edmonton Oilers (1984–85)	11–10–1

December

Game	Result	Date	Score	Opponent	Record
23	L	December 1, 1984	4–5 OT	Washington Capitals (1984–85)	11–11–1
24	T	December 3, 1984	3–3 OT	@ Quebec Nordiques (1984–85)	11–11–2
25	T	December 5, 1984	3–3 OT	@ Buffalo Sabres (1984–85)	11–11–3
26	L	December 6, 1984	1–3	Montreal Canadiens (1984–85)	11–12–3
27	L	December 8, 1984	1–3	Buffalo Sabres (1984–85)	11–13–3
28	T	December 12, 1984	3–3 OT	@ New York Rangers (1984–85)	11–13–4
29	T	December 13, 1984	5–5 OT	Quebec Nordiques (1984–85)	11–13–5
30	W	December 15, 1984	2–1 OT	Vancouver Canucks (1984–85)	12–13–5
31	W	December 18, 1984	6–4	@ Montreal Canadiens (1984–85)	13–13–5
32	L	December 19, 1984	5–6	@ Hartford Whalers (1984–85)	13–14–5
33	L	December 22, 1984	4–6	@ Toronto Maple Leafs (1984–85)	13–15–5
34	W	December 23, 1984	4–3 OT	Minnesota North Stars (1984–85)	14–15–5
35	T	December 27, 1984	6–6 OT	@ Los Angeles Kings (1984–85)	14–15–6
36	W	December 29, 1984	5–3	@ Minnesota North Stars (1984–85)	15–15–6
37	W	December 30, 1984	5–3	@ Winnipeg Jets (1984–85)	16–15–6

January

Game	Result	Date	Score	Opponent	Record
38	L	January 1, 1985	1–5	@ Washington Capitals (1984–85)	16–16–6
39	T	January 5, 1985	3–3 OT	New York Rangers (1984–85)	16–16–7
40	W	January 7, 1985	5–4 OT	Los Angeles Kings (1984–85)	17–16–7
41	W	January 9, 1985	5–3	@ Toronto Maple Leafs (1984–85)	18–16–7
42	L	January 10, 1985	0–3	Buffalo Sabres (1984–85)	18–17–7
43	W	January 12, 1985	4–3	Detroit Red Wings (1984–85)	19–17–7
44	W	January 15, 1985	3–2	@ New Jersey Devils (1984–85)	20–17–7
45	L	January 17, 1985	3–4	Calgary Flames (1984–85)	20–18–7
46	L	January 19, 1985	3–4	@ Quebec Nordiques (1984–85)	20–19–7
47	W	January 21, 1985	3–1	Montreal Canadiens (1984–85)	21–19–7
48	W	January 24, 1985	5–2	Buffalo Sabres (1984–85)	22–19–7
49	L	January 26, 1985	2–3	Hartford Whalers (1984–85)	22–20–7
50	W	January 27, 1985	8–4	@ Hartford Whalers (1984–85)	23–20–7
51	L	January 30, 1985	2–6	@ Buffalo Sabres (1984–85)	23–21–7
52	W	January 31, 1985	6–5	Quebec Nordiques (1984–85)	24–21–7

February

Game	Result	Date	Score	Opponent	Record
53	L	February 2, 1985	3–4	Winnipeg Jets (1984–85)	24–22–7
54	W	February 7, 1985	7–5	Hartford Whalers (1984–85)	25–22–7
55	L	February 9, 1985	5–6	Chicago Black Hawks (1984–85)	25–23–7
56	L	February 10, 1985	3–4	@ Chicago Black Hawks (1984–85)	25–24–7
57	T	February 14, 1985	3–3 OT	@ Los Angeles Kings (1984–85)	25–24–8
58	L	February 16, 1985	2–3 OT	@ Vancouver Canucks (1984–85)	25–25–8
59	W	February 20, 1985	3–2	@ Minnesota North Stars (1984–85)	26–25–8
60	L	February 23, 1985	1–7	@ New York Islanders (1984–85)	26–26–8
61	W	February 28, 1985	6–1	Philadelphia Flyers (1984–85)	27–26–8

March

Game	Result	Date	Score	Opponent	Record
62	W	March 2, 1985	5–0	Vancouver Canucks (1984–85)	28–26–8
63	L	March 5, 1985	4–6	@ Quebec Nordiques (1984–85)	28–27–8
64	W	March 7, 1985	4–0	Hartford Whalers (1984–85)	29–27–8
65	L	March 9, 1985	5–6 OT	Pittsburgh Penguins (1984–85)	29–28–8
66	W	March 10, 1985	3–2	@ Washington Capitals (1984–85)	30–28–8
67	W	March 13, 1985	7–3	@ Pittsburgh Penguins (1984–85)	31–28–8
68	W	March 14, 1985	7–4	@ New Jersey Devils (1984–85)	32–28–8
69	L	March 16, 1985	3–5	Calgary Flames (1984–85)	32–29–8
70	L	March 18, 1985	4–8	Quebec Nordiques (1984–85)	32–30–8
71	T	March 21, 1985	1–1 OT	St. Louis Blues (1984–85)	32–30–9
72	L	March 23, 1985	2–5	@ Hartford Whalers (1984–85)	32–31–9
73	W	March 24, 1985	4–3 OT	@ Buffalo Sabres (1984–85)	33–31–9
74	L	March 26, 1985	3–5	@ Montreal Canadiens (1984–85)	33–32–9
75	W	March 28, 1985	6–3	Edmonton Oilers (1984–85)	34–32–9
76	L	March 30, 1985	3–7	Montreal Canadiens (1984–85)	34–33–9

April

Game	Result	Date	Score	Opponent	Record
77	L	April 2, 1985	4–6	@ Quebec Nordiques (1984–85)	34–34–9
78	W	April 4, 1985	5–3	Buffalo Sabres (1984–85)	35–34–9
79	T	April 6, 1985	4–4 OT	@ Montreal Canadiens (1984–85)	35–34–10
80	W	April 7, 1985	5–1	Toronto Maple Leafs (1984–85)	36–34–10

Legend: Win (2 points) Loss (0 points) Tie (1 point)

== Playoffs ==
1985 Stanley Cup playoffs
Adams Division Semifinals vs. (A1) Montreal Canadiens – Canadiens win 3–2

Game	Date	Visitor	Score	Home	Record
1	April 10	Boston Bruins	5–3	Montreal Canadiens	1–0
2	April 11	Boston Bruins	3–5	Montreal Canadiens	1–1
3	April 13	Montreal Canadiens	4–2	Boston Bruins	1–2
4	April 14	Montreal Canadiens	6–7	Boston Bruins	2–2
5	April 16	Boston Bruins	0–1	Montreal Canadiens	2–3

Legend: Win Loss

== Player statistics ==
=== Regular season ===
Scoring

Player	Pos	GP	G	A	Pts	PIM	+/-	PPG	SHG	GWG
Raymond Bourque	D	73	20	66	86	53	30	10	1	1
Rick Middleton	RW	80	30	46	76	6	2	12	3	3
Ken Linseman	C	74	25	49	74	126	22	5	1	5
Tom Fergus	C	79	30	43	73	75	14	4	0	2
Keith Crowder	RW	79	32	38	70	152	31	14	0	1
Charlie Simmer	LW	63	33	30	63	35	14	12	0	5
Mike O'Connell	D	78	15	40	55	64	3	8	0	2
Steve Kasper	C	77	16	24	40	33	-12	0	5	1
Butch Goring	C	39	13	21	34	6	-8	2	2	2
Louis Sleigher	RW	70	12	19	31	45	-2	0	0	2
Terry O'Reilly	RW	63	13	17	30	168	-18	0	1	2
Geoff Courtnall	LW	64	12	16	28	82	-3	0	0	1
Dave Reid	LW	35	14	13	27	27	-1	2	0	5
Mats Thelin	D	73	5	13	18	9	9	0	0	2
John Blum	D	75	3	13	16	263	0	0	0	0
Mike Milbury	D	78	3	13	16	152	-6	0	1	0
Dave Donnelly	C	38	6	8	14	46	-1	0	1	1
Morris Lukowich	LW	22	5	8	13	21	7	0	0	1
Dave Silk	RW	29	7	5	12	22	3	0	0	0
Barry Pederson	C	22	4	8	12	10	-11	0	2	0
Lyndon Byers	RW	33	3	8	11	41	0	0	0	0
Jim Nill	RW	49	1	9	10	62	-11	0	0	0
Frank Simonetti	D	43	1	5	6	26	-1	0	0	0
Nevin Markwart	LW	26	0	4	4	36	-1	0	0	0
Brian Curran	D	56	0	1	1	158	-8	0	0	0
Cleon Daskalakis	G	8	0	0	0	0	0	0	0	0
Greg Johnston	RW	6	0	0	0	0	-1	0	0	0
Doug Keans	G	25	0	0	0	6	0	0	0	0
Doug Kostynski	C	6	0	0	0	2	0	0	0	0
Doug Morrison	RW	1	0	0	0	2	0	0	0	0
Pete Peeters	G	51	0	0	0	20	0	0	0	0
Don Sylvestri	G	3	0	0	0	2	0	0	0	0

Goaltending

Player	MIN	GP	W	L	T	GA	GAA	SO
Pete Peeters	2975	51	19	26	4	172	3.47	1
Doug Keans	1497	25	16	6	3	82	3.29	1
Cleon Daskalakis	289	8	1	2	1	24	4.98	0
Don Sylvestri	102	3	0	0	2	6	3.53	0
Team:	4863	80	36	34	10	284	3.50	2

=== Playoffs ===
Scoring

Player	Pos	GP	G	A	Pts	PIM	+/-	PPG	SHG	GWG
Ken Linseman	C	5	4	6	10	8	6	0	0	1
Mike O'Connell	D	5	1	5	6	0	1	1	0	0
Keith Crowder	RW	4	3	2	5	19	3	0	0	1
Charlie Simmer	LW	5	2	2	4	2	5	0	0	0
Rick Middleton	RW	5	3	0	3	0	1	0	0	0
Terry O'Reilly	RW	5	1	2	3	9	-2	0	0	0
Raymond Bourque	D	5	0	3	3	4	1	0	0	0
Butch Goring	C	5	1	1	2	0	1	0	0	0
Geoff Courtnall	LW	5	0	2	2	7	-3	0	0	0
Steve Kasper	C	5	1	0	1	9	-4	0	0	0
Dave Reid	LW	5	1	0	1	0	0	0	0	0
Frank Simonetti	D	5	0	1	1	2	-1	0	0	0
John Blum	D	5	0	0	0	13	2	0	0	0
Dave Donnelly	C	1	0	0	0	0	0	0	0	0
Tom Fergus	C	5	0	0	0	4	-1	0	0	0
Doug Keans	G	4	0	0	0	0	0	0	0	0
Morris Lukowich	LW	1	0	0	0	0	0	0	0	0
Nevin Markwart	LW	1	0	0	0	0	0	0	0	0
Mike Milbury	D	5	0	0	0	10	4	0	0	0
Pete Peeters	G	1	0	0	0	0	0	0	0	0
Louis Sleigher	RW	5	0	0	0	4	-1	0	0	0
Mats Thelin	D	5	0	0	0	6	-3	0	0	0

Goaltending

Player	MIN	GP	W	L	GA	GAA	SO
Doug Keans	240	4	2	2	15	3.75	0
Pete Peeters	60	1	0	1	4	4.00	0
Team:	300	5	2	3	19	3.80	0

Note:

Pos = Position;GP = Games played; G = Goals; A = Assists; Pts = Points; PIM = Penalty minutes; +/- = Plus/minus; PPG = Power-play goals; SHG = Short-handed goals; GWG = Game-winning goals
Pos = Position;GP = Games played; Min, TOI = Minutes played; W = Wins; L = Losses; T,T/OT = Ties; OTL = Overtime losses; GA = Goals-against; GAA = Goals-against average; SO = Shutouts; SA = Shots against; SV = Shots saved;SV% = Save percentage;

== Draft picks ==
Boston's draft picks at the 1984 NHL entry draft held at the Montreal Forum in Montreal.

Round	#	Player	Nationality	College/Junior/Club team (League)
1	19	Dave Pasin	Canada	Prince Albert Raiders (WHL)
2	40	Ray Podloski	Canada	Portland Winter Hawks (WHL)
3	61	Jeff Cornelius	Canada	Toronto Marlboros (OHL)
4	82	Bob Joyce	Canada	Notre Dame Hounds (SJHL)
5	103	Mike Bishop	Canada	London Knights (OHL)
6	124	Randy Oswald	Canada	Michigan Technological University (WCHA)
7	145	Mark Thietke	Canada	Saskatoon Blades (WHL)
8	166	Don Sweeney	Canada	St. Paul's School (USHS-NH)
9	186	Kevin Heffernan	United States	Weymouth High School (USHS-MA)
10	207	J. D. Urbanic	Canada	Windsor Spitfires (OHL)
11	227	Bill Kopecky	United States	Austin Preparatory School (USHS-MA)
12	248	Jim Newhouse	United States	Matignon High School (USHS-MA)

== See also ==
- 1984–85 NHL season
