= 1984–85 New Jersey Devils season =

National Hockey League season

1984–85 New Jersey Devils
- Division: 5th Patrick
- Conference: 10th Wales
- 1984–85 record: 22–48–10
- Home record: 13–21–6
- Road record: 9–27–4
- Goals for: 264
- Goals against: 346

Team information
- General manager: Max McNab
- Coach: Doug Carpenter
- Captain: Mel Bridgman
- Alternate captains: None
- Arena: Brendan Byrne Arena

Team leaders
- Goals: Mel Bridgman; Aaron Broten (22)
- Assists: Dave Pichette (40)
- Points: Mel Bridgman (61)
- Penalty minutes: Pat Verbeek (162)
- Plus/minus: Bob Lorimer (+6)
- Wins: Chico Resch (15)
- Goals against average: Ron Low (3.85)

The 1984–85 New Jersey Devils season was the 11th season for the National Hockey League (NHL) franchise that was established on June 11, 1974, and third season since the franchise relocated from Colorado prior to the 1982–83 NHL season. For the seventh consecutive season the team did not qualify for the playoffs.

== Offseason ==
Lou Vairo joined the team as an assistant coach to Carpenter.

== Regular season ==
=== Final standings ===
Patrick Division
	GP	W	L	T	GF	GA	Pts
**Philadelphia Flyers**	80	53	20	7	348	241	113
**Washington Capitals**	80	46	25	9	322	240	101
**New York Islanders**	80	40	34	6	345	312	86
**New York Rangers**	80	26	44	10	295	345	62
New Jersey Devils	80	22	48	10	264	346	54
Pittsburgh Penguins	80	24	51	5	276	385	53

Note: GP = Games played, W = Wins, L = Losses, T = Ties, Pts = Points, GF = Goals for, GA = Goals against
Note: Teams that qualified for the playoffs are highlighted in bold.

=== Record vs. opponents ===
Patrick Division record vs. opponents

==== Vs. Wales Conference ====
**Vs. Patrick Division**

1984–85 NHL records
Team	**NJD**	**NYI**	**NYR**	**PHI**	**PIT**	**WSH**	**Total**
New Jersey	—	3−2−2	2−5	2−5	5−2	2−4−1	14−18−3
N.Y. Islanders	2−3−2	—	4−3	3−3−1	5−2	3−4	17−15−3
N.Y. Rangers	5−2	3−4	—	0−7	4−3	2−5	14−21−0
Philadelphia	5−2	3−3−1	7−0	—	5−2	5−1−1	25−8−2
Pittsburgh	2−5	2−5	3−4	2–5	—	0−6−1	9−25−1
Washington	4−2−1	4−3	5−2	1–5−1	6−0–1	—	20−13−2

**Vs. Adams Division**

1984–85 NHL records
Team	**BOS**	**BUF**	**HFD**	**MTL**	**QUE**	**Total**
New Jersey	0−3	0−3	0−3	1−1−1	1−1−1	2−11−2
N.Y. Islanders	1−2	2−1	1−1−1	1−2	0−3	5−9−1
N.Y. Rangers	0−1−2	1−1−1	0−1−2	0−2−1	1−2	2−7−6
Philadelphia	2−1	1−1−1	2−0−1	1−2	1−1−1	7−5−3
Pittsburgh	1−2	0−2−1	1−2	1−2	0−3	3−11−1
Washington	2−1	1−2	1−2	1−1−1	2−1	7−7−1

==== Vs. Campbell Conference ====
**Vs. Norris Division**

1984–85 NHL records
Team	**CHI**	**DET**	**MIN**	**STL**	**TOR**	**Total**
New Jersey	0−3	1−1−1	1−1−1	0−2−1	3−0	5−7−3
N.Y. Islanders	3−0	2−1	1−1−1	3−0	2−1	11−3−1
N.Y. Rangers	0−3	1−2	1−2	2−0−1	2−0−1	6−7−2
Philadelphia	2−1	2−0−1	3−0	3−0	2−1	12−2−1
Pittsburgh	1−2	1−1−1	1−2	1−2	2−1	6−8−1
Washington	3−0	2−1	2−0−1	2−0−1	2−0−1	11−1−3

**Vs. Smythe Division**

1984–85 NHL records
Team	**CGY**	**EDM**	**LAK**	**VAN**	**WIN**	**Total**
New Jersey	0−2−1	1−2	0−3	0−3	0−2−1	1−12−2
N.Y. Islanders	1−2	0−2−1	2−1	2−1	2−1	7−7−1
N.Y. Rangers	0−2−1	1−1−1	1−2	2−1	0−3	4−9−2
Philadelphia	2−1	3−0	1−1−1	3−0	0−3	9−5−1
Pittsburgh	2−0−1	1−1−1	0−3	2−1	1−2	6−7−2
Washington	2−1	0−1−2	2−1	3−0	1−2	8−5−2

== Schedule and results ==
1984–85 regular season
October

Game	Result	Date	Score	Opponent	Record
1	W	October 12, 1984	7–2	New York Islanders (1984–85)	1–0–0
2	L	October 13, 1984	1–4	@ Detroit Red Wings (1984–85)	1–1–0
3	L	October 16, 1984	4–6	@ New York Islanders (1984–85)	1–2–0
4	W	October 19, 1984	4–1	Toronto Maple Leafs (1984–85)	2–2–0
5	L	October 20, 1984	3–8	@ St. Louis Blues (1984–85)	2–3–0
6	W	October 24, 1984	5–2	@ Pittsburgh Penguins (1984–85)	3–3–0
7	L	October 25, 1984	2–11	New York Rangers (1984–85)	3–4–0
8	L	October 27, 1984	2–4	Philadelphia Flyers (1984–85)	3–5–0
9	L	October 31, 1984	6–7	Pittsburgh Penguins (1984–85)	3–6–0

November

Game	Result	Date	Score	Opponent	Record
10	T	November 2, 1984	2–2 OT	Minnesota North Stars (1984–85)	3–6–1
11	L	November 3, 1984	4–6	@ Washington Capitals (1984–85)	3–7–1
12	L	November 8, 1984	2–3	Edmonton Oilers (1984–85)	3–8–1
13	T	November 10, 1984	2–2 OT	Washington Capitals (1984–85)	3–8–2
14	L	November 15, 1984	3–5	@ Boston Bruins (1984–85)	3–9–2
15	L	November 17, 1984	0–5	@ Montreal Canadiens (1984–85)	3–10–2
16	W	November 18, 1984	6–0	@ New York Rangers (1984–85)	4–10–2
17	L	November 21, 1984	1–8	@ Los Angeles Kings (1984–85)	4–11–2
18	L	November 23, 1984	4–5 OT	@ Minnesota North Stars (1984–85)	4–12–2
19	W	November 24, 1984	5–3	@ Pittsburgh Penguins (1984–85)	5–12–2
20	W	November 27, 1984	3–2	Minnesota North Stars (1984–85)	6–12–2
21	W	November 29, 1984	2–1	@ Philadelphia Flyers (1984–85)	7–12–2

December

Game	Result	Date	Score	Opponent	Record
22	L	December 1, 1984	3–5	Chicago Black Hawks (1984–85)	7–13–2
23	L	December 4, 1984	1–4	@ Washington Capitals (1984–85)	7–14–2
24	T	December 7, 1984	3–3 OT	Calgary Flames (1984–85)	7–14–3
25	L	December 8, 1984	3–7	@ Quebec Nordiques (1984–85)	7–15–3
26	W	December 11, 1984	7–5	@ New York Islanders (1984–85)	8–15–3
27	T	December 13, 1984	4–4 OT	St. Louis Blues (1984–85)	8–15–4
28	W	December 15, 1984	8–3	Quebec Nordiques (1984–85)	9–15–4
29	W	December 17, 1984	5–2	Edmonton Oilers (1984–85)	10–15–4
30	W	December 19, 1984	3–2	@ Pittsburgh Penguins (1984–85)	11–15–4
31	L	December 20, 1984	4–8	@ Philadelphia Flyers (1984–85)	11–16–4
32	L	December 22, 1984	3–5	New York Rangers (1984–85)	11–17–4
33	L	December 26, 1984	3–5	@ Hartford Whalers (1984–85)	11–18–4
34	W	December 27, 1984	4–1	Toronto Maple Leafs (1984–85)	12–18–4
35	L	December 29, 1984	1–2	Buffalo Sabres (1984–85)	12–19–4
36	L	December 31, 1984	4–6	@ Buffalo Sabres (1984–85)	12–20–4

January

Game	Result	Date	Score	Opponent	Record
37	L	January 3, 1985	4–6	Vancouver Canucks (1984–85)	12–21–4
38	W	January 5, 1985	5–4	Montreal Canadiens (1984–85)	13–21–4
39	L	January 6, 1985	4–5 OT	@ New York Rangers (1984–85)	13–22–4
40	L	January 10, 1985	2–3	New York Islanders (1984–85)	13–23–4
41	W	January 12, 1985	5–3	Washington Capitals (1984–85)	14–23–4
42	W	January 14, 1985	2–1	@ New York Rangers (1984–85)	15–23–4
43	L	January 15, 1985	2–3	Boston Bruins (1984–85)	15–24–4
44	L	January 18, 1985	6–9	New York Rangers (1984–85)	15–25–4
45	T	January 19, 1985	4–4 OT	@ Montreal Canadiens (1984–85)	15–25–5
46	L	January 23, 1985	3–6	@ Calgary Flames (1984–85)	15–26–5
47	L	January 25, 1985	2–4	@ Edmonton Oilers (1984–85)	15–27–5
48	L	January 29, 1985	3–6	@ Los Angeles Kings (1984–85)	15–28–5
49	L	January 31, 1985	1–3	@ Philadelphia Flyers (1984–85)	15–29–5

February

Game	Result	Date	Score	Opponent	Record
50	W	February 1, 1985	3–2	New York Islanders (1984–85)	16–29–5
51	T	February 3, 1985	5–5 OT	Detroit Red Wings (1984–85)	16–29–6
52	W	February 7, 1985	6–3	Pittsburgh Penguins (1984–85)	17–29–6
53	T	February 9, 1985	2–2 OT	@ Quebec Nordiques (1984–85)	17–29–7
54	L	February 14, 1985	0–4	Hartford Whalers (1984–85)	17–30–7
55	W	February 16, 1985	6–3	@ Toronto Maple Leafs (1984–85)	18–30–7
56	T	February 17, 1985	2–2 OT	@ Winnipeg Jets (1984–85)	18–30–8
57	L	February 19, 1985	5–7	@ Vancouver Canucks (1984–85)	18–31–8
58	L	February 21, 1985	3–5	Los Angeles Kings (1984–85)	18–32–8
59	L	February 23, 1985	1–5	Calgary Flames (1984–85)	18–33–8
60	L	February 26, 1985	3–4	Buffalo Sabres (1984–85)	18–34–8
61	L	February 27, 1985	3–6	@ Chicago Black Hawks (1984–85)	18–35–8

March

Game	Result	Date	Score	Opponent	Record
62	L	March 1, 1985	1–4	Hartford Whalers (1984–85)	18–36–8
63	W	March 3, 1985	5–2	Philadelphia Flyers (1984–85)	19–36–8
64	L	March 5, 1985	1–4	@ Washington Capitals (1984–85)	19–37–8
65	T	March 7, 1985	4–4 OT	New York Islanders (1984–85)	19–37–9
66	W	March 9, 1985	8–5	@ Detroit Red Wings (1984–85)	20–37–9
67	L	March 10, 1985	1–7	@ Winnipeg Jets (1984–85)	20–38–9
68	L	March 12, 1985	3–6	Winnipeg Jets (1984–85)	20–39–9
69	L	March 14, 1985	4–7	Boston Bruins (1984–85)	20–40–9
70	L	March 17, 1985	3–7	@ New York Rangers (1984–85)	20–41–9
71	L	March 19, 1985	1–4	@ Washington Capitals (1984–85)	20–42–9
72	L	March 21, 1985	2–3	Vancouver Canucks (1984–85)	20–43–9
73	L	March 23, 1985	3–5	Philadelphia Flyers (1984–85)	20–44–9
74	L	March 27, 1985	3–4	@ Pittsburgh Penguins (1984–85)	20–45–9
75	W	March 28, 1985	3–2	Washington Capitals (1984–85)	21–45–9
76	W	March 30, 1985	6–4	Pittsburgh Penguins (1984–85)	22–45–9

April

Game	Result	Date	Score	Opponent	Record
77	L	April 2, 1985	4–8	@ St. Louis Blues (1984–85)	22–46–9
78	L	April 3, 1985	0–5	@ Chicago Black Hawks (1984–85)	22–47–9
79	T	April 6, 1985	5–5 OT	@ New York Islanders (1984–85)	22–47–10
80	L	April 7, 1985	1–6	Philadelphia Flyers (1984–85)	22–48–10

Legend: Win (2 points) Loss (0 points) Tie (1 point)

== Player statistics ==
=== Regular season ===
Scoring

Player	Pos	GP	G	A	Pts	PIM	+/-	PPG	SHG	GWG
Mel Bridgman	C	80	22	39	61	105	-16	5	3	3
Aaron Broten	LW/C	80	22	35	57	38	-18	10	0	2
Dave Pichette	D	71	17	40	57	41	-20	8	0	2
Kirk Muller	LW	80	17	37	54	69	-31	9	1	0
Tim Higgins	RW	71	19	29	48	30	-10	5	0	2
Paul Gagne	LW	79	24	19	43	28	-11	3	0	1
Doug Sulliman	RW	57	22	16	38	4	-11	6	0	1
Pat Verbeek	RW	78	15	18	33	162	-24	5	1	1
John MacLean	RW	61	13	20	33	44	-11	1	0	4
Bruce Driver	D	67	9	23	32	36	-22	3	1	0
Jan Ludvig	RW	74	12	19	31	53	-19	3	0	1
Rick Meagher	C	71	11	20	31	22	-13	1	1	1
Uli Hiemer	D	53	5	24	29	70	-14	3	0	0
Rich Preston	RW	75	12	15	27	26	-24	1	0	1
Joe Cirella	D	66	6	18	24	141	-45	2	0	0
Greg Adams	LW	36	12	9	21	14	-14	5	0	0
Phil Russell	D	66	4	16	20	110	-14	0	1	0
Don Lever	LW	67	10	8	18	31	-29	0	1	1
Dave Lewis	D	74	3	9	12	78	-29	0	0	2
Rocky Trottier	RW	33	5	3	8	2	-3	0	0	0
Bob Lorimer	D	46	2	6	8	35	6	0	0	0
Bob Hoffmeyer	D	37	1	6	7	65	-15	0	0	0
Gary McAdam	LW	4	1	1	2	0	0	0	0	0
Rich Chernomaz	RW	3	0	2	2	2	2	0	0	0
Mitch Wilson	C	9	0	2	2	21	1	0	0	0
Hannu Kamppuri	G	13	0	1	1	2	0	0	0	0
Ken Daneyko	D	1	0	0	0	10	-1	0	0	0
Alan Hepple	D	1	0	0	0	0	-2	0	0	0
Ron Low	G	26	0	0	0	21	0	0	0	0
Glenn Resch	G	51	0	0	0	6	0	0	0	0

Goaltending

Player	MIN	GP	W	L	T	GA	GAA	SO
Glenn Resch	2884	51	15	27	5	200	4.16	0
Ron Low	1326	26	6	11	4	85	3.85	1
Hannu Kamppuri	645	13	1	10	1	54	5.02	0
Team:	4855	80	22	48	10	339	4.19	1

Note: GP = Games played; G = Goals; A = Assists; Pts = Points; +/- = Plus/minus; PIM = Penalty minutes; PPG=Power-play goals; SHG=Short-handed goals; GWG=Game-winning goals
MIN=Minutes played; W = Wins; L = Losses; T = Ties; GA = Goals against; GAA = Goals against average; SO = Shutouts;

== Draft picks ==
New Jersey's draft picks at the 1984 NHL entry draft held at the Montreal Forum in Montreal.

Round	#	Player	Nationality	College/Junior/Club team (League)
1	2	Kirk Muller	Canada	Laval Voisins (QMJHL)
2	23	Craig Billington	Canada	Belleville Bulls (OHL)
3	44	Neil Davey	Canada	Michigan State (CCHA)
4	74	Paul Ysebaert	Canada	Petrolia Jets (WOJBHL)
5	86	Jon Morris	United States	Chelmsford High School (USHS-MA)
6	107	Kirk McLean	Canada	Oshawa Generals (OHL)
7	128	Ian Ferguson	United States	Oshawa Generals (OHL)
8	149	Vladimir Kames	Czechoslovakia	HC Dukla Jihlava (Czechoslovakia)
9	170	Mike Roth	United States	Hill-Murray High School (USHS-MN)
10	190	Mike Peluso	United States	Greenway High School (USHS-MN)
11	211	Jarkko Piiparinen	Finland	Kiekko-Reipas (Finland)
12	231	Chris Kiene	United States	Springfield Olympics (NEJHL)

== See also ==
- 1984–85 NHL season
