= Wally Weir =

Canadian ice hockey player

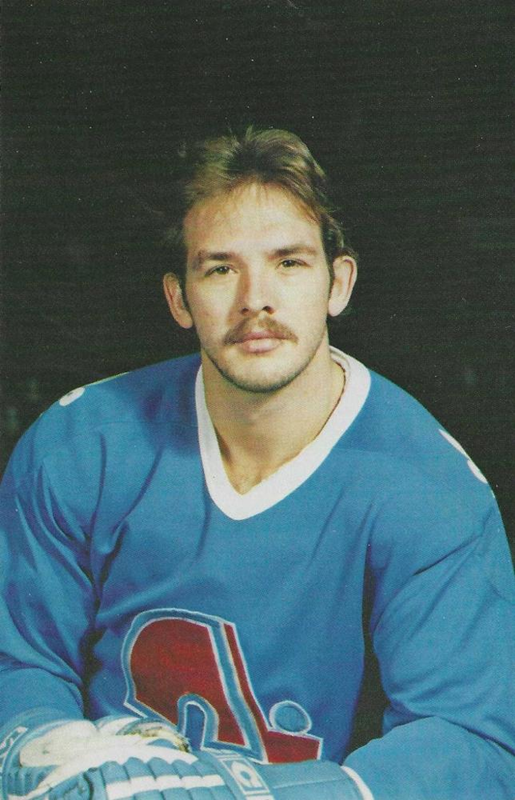
- Weir in 1981 postcard
- Born: June 3, 1954 (age 71) Verdun, Quebec, Canada
- Height: 6 ft 2 in (188 cm)
- Weight: 205 lb (93 kg; 14 st 9 lb)
- Position: Defence
- Shot: Left
- Played for: Quebec Nordiques; Hartford Whalers; Pittsburgh Penguins
- NHL draft: Undrafted
- Playing career: 1975–1986

Walter Edward Weir (born June 3, 1954) is a Canadian former professional ice hockey player who played 320 games in the National Hockey League from 1979 to 1985 and 150 games in the World Hockey Association from 1976 to 1979.

Weir was born in Verdun, Quebec. He played for the Quebec Nordiques, Hartford Whalers, and Pittsburgh Penguins.

== Career statistics ==
=== Regular season and playoffs ===
			Regular season					Playoffs
Season	Team	League	GP	G	A	Pts	PIM	GP	G	A	Pts	PIM
1973–74	Longueuil Rebels	QJHL-B	—	—	—	—	—	—	—	—	—	—
1975–76	Beauce Jaros	NAHL	56	6	20	26	180	14	5	4	9	54
1975–76	Flint Generals	IHL	7	0	0	0	4	—	—	—	—	—
1976–77	Quebec Nordiques	WHA	69	3	17	20	197	17	1	5	6	13
1977–78	Quebec Nordiques	WHA	13	0	0	0	47	11	1	2	3	50
1978–79	Quebec Nordiques	WHA	68	2	7	9	166	4	0	1	1	4
1979–80	Quebec Nordiques	NHL	73	3	12	15	133	—	—	—	—	—
1980–81	Quebec Nordiques	NHL	54	6	8	14	77	3	0	0	0	15
1980–81	Rochester Americans	AHL	7	1	1	2	79	—	—	—	—	—
1981–82	Quebec Nordiques	NHL	62	3	5	8	173	15	0	0	0	45
1982–83	Quebec Nordiques	NHL	58	5	11	16	135	4	0	1	1	19
1983–84	Quebec Nordiques	NHL	25	2	3	5	17	1	0	0	0	17
1983–84	Fredericton Express	AHL	44	6	17	23	45	7	2	2	4	14
1984–85	Hartford Whalers	NHL	34	2	3	5	56	—	—	—	—	—
1984–85	Pittsburgh Penguins	NHL	14	0	3	3	34	—	—	—	—	—
1985–86	Baltimore Skipjacks	AHL	67	5	12	17	300	—	—	—	—	—
WHA totals			150	5	24	29	410	32	2	8	10	67
NHL totals			320	21	45	66	625	23	0	1	1	96
