= 1984–85 Toronto Maple Leafs season =

NHL hockey team season

1984–85 Toronto Maple Leafs
- Division: 5th Norris
- Conference: 10th Campbell
- 1984–85 record: 20–52–8
- Home record: 10–28–2
- Road record: 10–24–6
- Goals for: 253
- Goals against: 358

Team information
- General manager: Gerry McNamara
- Coach: Dan Maloney
- Captain: Rick Vaive
- Alternate captains: None
- Arena: Maple Leaf Gardens

Team leaders
- Goals: Rick Vaive (35)
- Assists: Dan Daoust (37)
- Points: Rick Vaive (68)
- Penalty minutes: Bob McGill (250)
- Wins: Tim Bernhardt (13)
- Goals against average: Tim Bernhardt (3.74)

The 1984–85 Toronto Maple Leafs season was the 68th season of the Toronto NHL franchise, the 58th season as the Maple Leafs. It was a miserable season as they finished last in the Norris Division and in the entire NHL with a 20–52–8 record for a total of 48 points, the worst record in the league and team history. The Maple Leafs did not qualify for the playoffs for the second consecutive season for the first time since the 1956–57 and 1957–58 seasons, and finished last in the NHL for the first time since the 1957-58 season.

== Offseason ==
=== NHL draft ===
= NHL All-Star

Round	Pick	Player	Nationality	College/Junior/Club team
1	4	Al Iafrate (D)	United States	Belleville Bulls (OHL)
2	25	Todd Gill (D)	Canada	Windsor Spitfires (OHL)
4	67	Jeff Reese (G)	Canada	London Knights (OHL)
5	88	Jack Capuano	United States	Kent School (USHS-CT)
6	109	Fabian Joseph	Canada	Victoria Cougars (WHL)
7	130	Joseph MacInnis	United States	Watertown High School (USHS-MA)
8	151	Derek Laxdal	Canada	Brandon Wheat Kings (WHL)
9	172	Dan Turner	Canada	Medicine Hat Tigers (WHL)
10	192	David Buckley	United States	Trinity-Pawling School (USHS-NY)
11	213	Mike Wurst	United States	Ohio State University (CCHA)
12	233	Peter Slanina	Czechoslovakia	VSZ Košice (Czechoslovakia)

== Regular season ==
=== Final standings ===
Norris Division
	GP	W	L	T	GF	GA	Pts
**St. Louis Blues**	80	37	31	12	299	288	86
**Chicago Black Hawks**	80	38	35	7	309	299	83
**Detroit Red Wings**	80	27	41	12	313	357	66
**Minnesota North Stars**	80	25	43	12	268	321	62
Toronto Maple Leafs	80	20	52	8	253	358	48

Note: GP = Games played, W = Wins, L = Losses, T = Ties, Pts = Points, GF = Goals for, GA = Goals against
Note: Teams that qualified for the playoffs are highlighted in bold.

=== Record vs. opponents ===
Norris Division record vs. opponents

==== Vs. Campbell Conference ====
**Vs. Norris Division**

1984–85 NHL records
Team	**CHI**	**DET**	**MIN**	**STL**	**TOR**	**Total**
Chicago	—	3−3−2	4−3−1	3−4−1	6−1−1	**16−11−5**
Detroit	3−3−2	—	3−2−3	1−6−1	5−3	**12−14−6**
Minnesota	3−4−1	2−3−3	—	1−6−1	6−2	**12−15−5**
St. Louis	4−3−1	6−1−1	6−1−1	—	4−3−1	**20−8−4**
Toronto	1−6−1	3−5	2−6	3−4−1	—	**9−21−2**

**Vs. Smythe Division**

1984–85 NHL records
Team	**CGY**	**EDM**	**LAK**	**VAN**	**WIN**	**Total**
Chicago	2−1	0−3	2−0−1	2−1	1−1−1	**7−6−2**
Detroit	1−2	0−3	1−2	2−1	0−2−1	**4−10−1**
Minnesota	0−1−2	0−3	1−1−1	1−1−1	1−2	**3−8−4**
St. Louis	3−0	0−3	2−1	3−0	1−0−2	**9−4−2**
Toronto	0−3	0−2−1	1−2	1−1−1	0−3	**2−11−2**

**Vs. Wales Conference**

**Vs. Adams Division**

1984–85 NHL records
Team	**BOS**	**BUF**	**HFD**	**MTL**	**QUE**	**Total**
Chicago	3−0	0−3	1−2	2−1	0−3	**6−9−0**
Detroit	0−3	1−1−1	1−2	1−1−1	2−1	**5−8−2**
Minnesota	0−3	0−3	2−1	2−1	0−3	**4−11−0**
St. Louis	0−1−2	2−1	1−2	0−2−1	1−2	**4−8−3**
Toronto	1−2	1−2	1−2	3−0	0−1−2	**6−7−2**

**Vs. Patrick Division**

1984–85 NHL records
Team	**NJD**	**NYI**	**NYR**	**PHI**	**PIT**	**WSH**	**Total**
Chicago	3−0	0−3	3−0	1−2	2−1	0−3	**9−9−0**
Detroit	1−1−1	1−2	2−1	0−2−1	1−1−1	1−2	**6−9−3**
Minnesota	1−1−1	1−1−1	2−1	0−3	2−1	0−2−1	**6−9−3**
St. Louis	2−0−1	0−3	0−2−1	0−3	2−1	0−2−1	**4−11−3**
Toronto	0−3	1−2	0−2−1	1−2	1−2	0−2−1	**3−13−2**

== Schedule and results ==
1984–85 regular season
October

Game	Result	Date	Score	Opponent	Record
1	W	October 11, 1984	1–0 OT	@ Minnesota North Stars (1984–85)	1–0–0
2	W	October 13, 1984	4–3 OT	Buffalo Sabres (1984–85)	2–0–0
3	L	October 14, 1984	2–5	@ Winnipeg Jets (1984–85)	2–1–0
4	L	October 17, 1984	3–5	Hartford Whalers (1984–85)	2–2–0
5	L	October 19, 1984	1–4	@ New Jersey Devils (1984–85)	2–3–0
6	L	October 20, 1984	3–12	Quebec Nordiques (1984–85)	2–4–0
7	W	October 24, 1984	6–1	Detroit Red Wings (1984–85)	3–4–0
8	T	October 26, 1984	2–2 OT	@ Quebec Nordiques (1984–85)	3–4–1
9	L	October 27, 1984	3–5	Calgary Flames (1984–85)	3–5–1
10	L	October 31, 1984	5–6 OT	@ St. Louis Blues (1984–85)	3–6–1

November

Game	Result	Date	Score	Opponent	Record
11	L	November 3, 1984	0–7	@ Los Angeles Kings (1984–85)	3–7–1
12	L	November 5, 1984	3–5	@ Minnesota North Stars (1984–85)	3–8–1
13	T	November 7, 1984	4–4 OT	Vancouver Canucks (1984–85)	3–8–2
14	T	November 10, 1984	4–4 OT	Chicago Black Hawks (1984–85)	3–8–3
15	L	November 11, 1984	6–7	Minnesota North Stars (1984–85)	3–9–3
16	L	November 14, 1984	3–4	Los Angeles Kings (1984–85)	3–10–3
17	L	November 17, 1984	3–5	Winnipeg Jets (1984–85)	3–11–3
18	W	November 19, 1984	6–4	@ Montreal Canadiens (1984–85)	4–11–3
19	L	November 21, 1984	1–7	@ Minnesota North Stars (1984–85)	4–12–3
20	L	November 23, 1984	5–6	@ Detroit Red Wings (1984–85)	4–13–3
21	L	November 24, 1984	2–4	Minnesota North Stars (1984–85)	4–14–3
22	L	November 27, 1984	1–7	Edmonton Oilers (1984–85)	4–15–3
23	T	November 30, 1984	3–3 OT	@ New York Rangers (1984–85)	4–15–4

December

Game	Result	Date	Score	Opponent	Record
24	L	December 1, 1984	1–4	New York Rangers (1984–85)	4–16–4
25	L	December 4, 1984	6–7	@ Detroit Red Wings (1984–85)	4–17–4
26	L	December 5, 1984	2–4	Detroit Red Wings (1984–85)	4–18–4
27	T	December 8, 1984	3–3 OT	@ St. Louis Blues (1984–85)	4–18–5
28	L	December 9, 1984	2–7	@ Chicago Black Hawks (1984–85)	4–19–5
29	W	December 12, 1984	6–3	Philadelphia Flyers (1984–85)	5–19–5
30	L	December 14, 1984	4–6	@ Winnipeg Jets (1984–85)	5–20–5
31	L	December 15, 1984	2–5	Pittsburgh Penguins (1984–85)	5–21–5
32	L	December 17, 1984	2–3	St. Louis Blues (1984–85)	5–22–5
33	L	December 21, 1984	3–4	@ Chicago Black Hawks (1984–85)	5–23–5
34	W	December 22, 1984	6–4	Boston Bruins (1984–85)	6–23–5
35	L	December 26, 1984	0–6	@ Buffalo Sabres (1984–85)	6–24–5
36	L	December 27, 1984	1–4	@ New Jersey Devils (1984–85)	6–25–5
37	L	December 29, 1984	4–5	Chicago Black Hawks (1984–85)	6–26–5

January

Game	Result	Date	Score	Opponent	Record
38	L	January 2, 1985	1–2	Pittsburgh Penguins (1984–85)	6–27–5
39	L	January 5, 1985	1–4	Vancouver Canucks (1984–85)	6–28–5
40	L	January 7, 1985	4–7	Hartford Whalers (1984–85)	6–29–5
41	L	January 9, 1985	3–5	Boston Bruins (1984–85)	6–30–5
42	W	January 13, 1985	5–3	@ Vancouver Canucks (1984–85)	7–30–5
43	W	January 16, 1985	4–3	@ Los Angeles Kings (1984–85)	8–30–5
44	W	January 19, 1985	6–1	St. Louis Blues (1984–85)	9–30–5
45	T	January 22, 1985	2–2 OT	@ Quebec Nordiques (1984–85)	9–30–6
46	L	January 24, 1985	1–4	@ New York Islanders (1984–85)	9–31–6
47	L	January 26, 1985	2–5	Chicago Black Hawks (1984–85)	9–32–6
48	W	January 27, 1985	6–2	@ Chicago Black Hawks (1984–85)	10–32–6
49	W	January 30, 1985	6–5	@ Pittsburgh Penguins (1984–85)	11–32–6

February

Game	Result	Date	Score	Opponent	Record
50	T	February 1, 1985	3–3 OT	@ Washington Capitals (1984–85)	11–32–7
51	L	February 2, 1985	2–5	Minnesota North Stars (1984–85)	11–33–7
52	L	February 5, 1985	1–4	Washington Capitals (1984–85)	11–34–7
53	L	February 6, 1985	2–3	@ Chicago Black Hawks (1984–85)	11–35–7
54	W	February 9, 1985	6–2	@ Montreal Canadiens (1984–85)	12–35–7
55	W	February 10, 1985	3–2 OT	Montreal Canadiens (1984–85)	13–35–7
56	L	February 14, 1985	3–5	@ St. Louis Blues (1984–85)	13–36–7
57	L	February 16, 1985	3–6	New Jersey Devils (1984–85)	13–37–7
58	W	February 17, 1985	5–4 OT	@ Hartford Whalers (1984–85)	14–37–7
59	L	February 19, 1985	4–9	Edmonton Oilers (1984–85)	14–38–7
60	L	February 21, 1985	1–4	@ Philadelphia Flyers (1984–85)	14–39–7
61	W	February 23, 1985	4–2	@ Detroit Red Wings (1984–85)	15–39–7
62	L	February 25, 1985	3–4 OT	Chicago Black Hawks (1984–85)	15–40–7
63	W	February 27, 1985	6–1	Minnesota North Stars (1984–85)	16–40–7

March

Game	Result	Date	Score	Opponent	Record
64	W	March 2, 1985	4–2	New York Islanders (1984–85)	17–40–7
65	L	March 5, 1985	2–7	@ St. Louis Blues (1984–85)	17–41–7
66	L	March 6, 1985	3–5	Detroit Red Wings (1984–85)	17–42–7
67	L	March 9, 1985	2–4	@ New York Islanders (1984–85)	17–43–7
68	L	March 13, 1985	3–5	Calgary Flames (1984–85)	17–44–7
69	L	March 14, 1985	0–4	@ Washington Capitals (1984–85)	17–45–7
70	L	March 16, 1985	1–6	Philadelphia Flyers (1984–85)	17–46–7
71	W	March 18, 1985	4–3 OT	St. Louis Blues (1984–85)	18–46–7
72	L	March 20, 1985	4–7	@ Calgary Flames (1984–85)	18–47–7
73	T	March 22, 1985	3–3 OT	@ Edmonton Oilers (1984–85)	18–47–8
74	W	March 24, 1985	5–3	@ Detroit Red Wings (1984–85)	19–47–8
75	W	March 27, 1985	4–2	St. Louis Blues (1984–85)	20–47–8
76	L	March 30, 1985	3–9	Detroit Red Wings (1984–85)	20–48–8
77	L	March 31, 1985	5–7	@ New York Rangers (1984–85)	20–49–8

April

Game	Result	Date	Score	Opponent	Record
78	L	April 3, 1985	7–9	@ Minnesota North Stars (1984–85)	20–50–8
79	L	April 6, 1985	2–5	Buffalo Sabres (1984–85)	20–51–8
80	L	April 7, 1985	1–5	@ Boston Bruins (1984–85)	20–52–8

Legend: Win (2 points) Loss (0 points) Tie (1 point)

== Player statistics ==
=== Regular season ===
Scoring

Player	Pos	GP	G	A	Pts	PIM	+/-	PPG	SHG	GWG
Rick Vaive	RW	72	35	33	68	112	-26	13	0	2
John Anderson	RW	75	32	31	63	27	-20	14	1	5
Bill Derlago	C	62	31	31	62	21	-15	7	5	4
Miroslav Frycer	RW	65	25	30	55	55	-7	5	0	1
Dan Daoust	C	79	17	37	54	98	-27	1	3	2
Peter Ihnacak	C	70	22	22	44	24	-26	8	0	1
Jim Benning	D	80	9	35	44	55	-39	6	0	2
Borje Salming	D	73	6	33	39	76	-26	3	0	0
Greg Terrion	LW	72	14	17	31	20	-15	1	4	0
Gary Leeman	RW	53	5	26	31	72	-12	3	0	0
Stew Gavin	LW	73	12	13	25	38	-22	0	0	0
Russ Courtnall	RW	69	12	10	22	44	-23	0	2	1
Al Iafrate	D	68	5	16	21	51	-19	3	0	0
Walt Poddubny	LW	32	5	15	20	26	1	1	0	0
Gary Nylund	D	76	3	17	20	99	-37	0	0	0
Jeff Brubaker	LW	68	8	4	12	209	-18	2	0	1
Jim Korn	D/LW	41	5	5	10	171	-17	2	0	1
Bill Kitchen	D	29	1	4	5	27	-6	0	0	0
Bob McGill	D	72	0	5	5	250	0	0	0	0
Ken Strong	LW	11	2	0	2	4	-3	0	0	0
Bill Root	D	35	1	1	2	23	-25	0	0	0
Steve Thomas	LW	18	1	1	2	2	-13	0	0	0
Gary Yaremchuk	C	12	1	1	2	16	-7	0	0	0
Tim Bernhardt	G	37	0	2	2	4	0	0	0	0
Gaston Gingras	D	5	0	2	2	0	-7	0	0	0
Bill Stewart	D	27	0	2	2	32	-3	0	0	0
Todd Gill	D	10	1	0	1	13	-1	0	0	0
Allan Bester	G	15	0	1	1	4	0	0	0	0
Jeff Jackson	LW	17	0	1	1	24	-4	0	0	0
Wes Jarvis	C	26	0	1	1	2	-6	0	0	0
Ken Wregget	G	23	0	1	1	10	0	0	0	0
Greg Britz	RW	1	0	0	0	2	0	0	0	0
Larry Landon	RW	7	0	0	0	2	-4	0	0	0
Derek Laxdal	RW	3	0	0	0	6	-1	0	0	0
Basil McRae	LW	1	0	0	0	0	0	0	0	0
Craig Muni	D	8	0	0	0	0	0	0	0	0
Cam Plante	D	2	0	0	0	0	0	0	0	0
Rick St. Croix	G	12	0	0	0	0	0	0	0	0
Leigh Verstraete	RW	2	0	0	0	0	0	0	0	0

Goaltending

Player	MIN	GP	W	L	T	GA	GAA	SO
Tim Bernhardt	2182	37	13	19	4	136	3.74	0
Allan Bester	767	15	3	9	1	54	4.22	1
Rick St. Croix	628	11	2	9	0	54	5.16	0
Ken Wregget	1278	23	2	15	3	103	4.84	0
Team:	4855	80	20	52	8	347	4.29	1

Note:

Pos = Position;GP = Games played; G = Goals; A = Assists; Pts = Points; PIM = Penalty minutes; +/- = Plus/minus; PPG = Power-play goals; SHG = Short-handed goals; GWG = Game-winning goals
Pos = Position;GP = Games played; Min, TOI = Minutes played; W = Wins; L = Losses; T,T/OT = Ties; OTL = Overtime losses; GA = Goals-against; GAA = Goals-against average; SO = Shutouts; SA = Shots against; SV = Shots saved;SV% = Save percentage;

== Awards and honors ==
- Bill Derlago, Molson Cup (Most game star selections for Toronto Maple Leafs)

== Transactions ==
The Maple Leafs have been involved in the following transactions during the 1984–85 season.

=== Trades ===
August 17, 1984	To Montreal Canadiens Dom Campedelli; 4th round pick in 1986 – Kent Hulst	To Toronto Maple Leafs Bill Root; 2nd round pick in 1986 – Darryl Shannon
February 14, 1985	To Montreal Canadiens Gaston Gingras	To Toronto Maple Leafs Larry Landon
May 29, 1985	To Calgary Flames 4th round pick in 1987 – Tim Harris	To Toronto Maple Leafs Don Edwards

=== Waivers ===
October 9, 1984	To Edmonton Oilers Terry Martin
October 9, 1984	From Edmonton Oilers Jeff Brubaker

=== Free agents ===
Player	Former team
Bill Kitchen	Montreal Canadiens
Wes Jarvis	Los Angeles Kings
Kevin Maguire	Undrafted Free Agent
Tim Bernhardt	Calgary Flames

Player	New team
Bruce Boudreau	Baltimore Skipjacks (AHL)
