= 1984–85 Quebec Nordiques season =

Hockey season

1984–85 Quebec Nordiques
- Division: 2nd Adams
- Conference: 4th Wales
- 1984–85 record: 41–30–9
- Home record: 24–12–4
- Road record: 17–18–5
- Goals for: 323
- Goals against: 275

Team information
- General manager: Maurice Filion
- Coach: Michel Bergeron
- Captain: Mario Marois
- Alternate captains: None
- Arena: Colisée de Québec

Team leaders
- Goals: Michel Goulet (55)
- Assists: Peter Stastny (68)
- Points: Peter Stastny (100)
- Penalty minutes: Dale Hunter (209)
- Plus/minus: Bruce Bell (+32)
- Wins: Mario Gosselin (19)
- Goals against average: Mario Gosselin (3.34)

The 1984–85 Quebec Nordiques season was the Nordiques sixth season in the National Hockey League (NHL).

== Offseason ==
The Nordiques had a pretty quiet off-season, as they looked to build off of their successful 1983–84 season. The club hired the recently retired Guy Lapointe as an assistant coach, while they also signed goaltender Richard Sevigny as a free agent from the Montreal Canadiens. Sevigny had a 16-18-2 record with a 3.38 GAA with Montreal in 1983–84.

== Regular season ==
Quebec started the season off pretty slow, going only 3-6-1 in their first ten games, sitting in last place in the Adams Division. Quebec continued to play mediocre hockey for the majority of the first half of the season, as they had a 16-16-6 record after 38 games, battling with the Boston Bruins for third place in the division. The Nordiques played much better in the second half of the season, as they would battle with the Montreal Canadiens and Buffalo Sabres for first in the division. Quebec finished the season with a 41-30-9 record, earning 91 points, and a second-place finish, just three points behind the Canadiens.

Peter Stastny led the Nordiques offensively, leading the club with 100 points in 75 games, while Michel Goulet scored a team high 55 goals, while earning 95 points in 69 games. Anton Stastny had 38 goals and 80 points, while Dale Hunter scored 20 goals and 72 points, while accumulating a team high 209 penalty minutes. Brad Maxwell and Brent Ashton, acquired from the Minnesota North Stars in December, sparked the Nordiques, as Ashton had 51 points in 49 games, while Maxwell had 31 points in 50 games on the blueline.

In goal, Quebec was led by rookie Mario Gosselin, as he had a team high 19 wins with a team best 3.34 GAA in 35 games. Richard Sevigny had a 10-6-2 record with a 3.37 GAA in 20 games, while Dan Bouchard was 12-13-4 with a 3.49 GAA in 29 games.

=== Final standings ===
Adams Division
	GP	W	L	T	GF	GA	Pts
**Montreal Canadiens**	80	41	27	12	309	262	94
**Quebec Nordiques**	80	41	30	9	323	275	91
**Buffalo Sabres**	80	38	28	14	290	237	90
**Boston Bruins**	80	36	34	10	303	287	82
Hartford Whalers	80	30	41	9	268	318	69

Note: GP = Games played, W = Wins, L = Losses, T = Ties, Pts = Points, GF = Goals for, GA = Goals against
Note: Teams that qualified for the playoffs are highlighted in bold.

=== Record vs. opponents ===
Adams Division record vs. opponents

==== Vs. Wales Conference ====
**Vs. Adams Division**

1984–85 NHL records
Team	**BOS**	**BUF**	**HFD**	**MTL**	**QUE**	**Total**
Boston	—	3–4–1	4–4	3–4–1	2–4–2	**12–16–4**
Buffalo	4–3–1	—	5–0–3	2–4–2	3–4–1	**14–11–7**
Hartford	4–4	0–5–3	—	2–5−1	3−5	**9–19–4**
Montreal	4–3–1	4–2–2	5–2−1	—	6–1–1	**19–8–5**
Quebec	4–2–2	4–3–1	5–3	1–6–1	—	**14–14–4**

**Vs. Patrick Division**

1984–85 NHL records
Team	**NJD**	**NYI**	**NYR**	**PHI**	**PIT**	**WSH**	**Total**
Boston	3−0	2−1	1−0–2	1−2	2−1	1−2	**10−6−2**
Buffalo	3−0	1−2	1−1−1	1−1–1	2−0–1	2−1	**10−5−3**
Hartford	3−0	1–1–1	1–0–2	0–2–1	2–1	2−1	**9−5−4**
Montreal	1−1–1	2−1	2–0–1	2−1	2−1	1−1–1	**10−5−3**
Quebec	1–1−1	3−0	2–1	1−1−1	3−0	1−2	**11−5−2**

==== Vs. Campbell Conference ====
**Vs. Norris Division**

1984–85 NHL records
Team	**CHI**	**DET**	**MIN**	**STL**	**TOR**	**Total**
Boston	0–3	3–0	3–0	1–0–2	2–1	**9–4–2**
Buffalo	3−0	1−1−1	3−0	1−2	2−1	**10−4−1**
Hartford	2–1	2−1	1−2	2–1	2–1	**9–6–0**
Montreal	1−2	1−1–1	1–2	2–0–1	0−3	**5–8–2**
Quebec	3–0	1–2	3–0	2–1	1–0–2	**10–3–2**

**Vs. Smythe Division**

1984–85 NHL records
Team	**CGY**	**EDM**	**LAK**	**VAN**	**WIN**	**Total**
Boston	0−3	1−2	1−0–2	2−1	1−2	**5−8−2**
Buffalo	3−0	0–2–1	0−2−1	0−2–1	1−2	**4−8−3**
Hartford	0−3	1–2	0–2–1	1–2	1–2	**3–11–1**
Montreal	0–2−1	2−1	2−0–1	1–2	2−1	**7−6−2**
Quebec	1−1–1	0−3	2−1	2−1	1−2	**6−8−1**

== Schedule and results ==
1984–85 regular season
October

Game	Result	Date	Score	Opponent	Record	Attendance
1	W	October 11, 1984	5–2	@ Vancouver Canucks (1984–85)	1–0–0	11,966
2	L	October 13, 1984	2–7	@ Calgary Flames (1984–85)	1–1–0	16,863
3	L	October 14, 1984	2–9	@ Edmonton Oilers (1984–85)	1–2–0	17,498
4	W	October 17, 1984	4–1	Buffalo Sabres (1984–85)	2–2–0	15,262
5	L	October 19, 1984	4–5	@ Buffalo Sabres (1984–85)	2–3–0	14,178
6	W	October 20, 1984	12–3	@ Toronto Maple Leafs (1984–85)	3–3–0	16,182
7	L	October 23, 1984	1–3	Montreal Canadiens (1984–85)	3–4–0	15,381
8	T	October 26, 1984	2–2 OT	Toronto Maple Leafs (1984–85)	3–4–1	14,739
9	L	October 27, 1984	2–5	New York Rangers (1984–85)	3–5–1	14,782
10	L	October 29, 1984	2–4	@ Montreal Canadiens (1984–85)	3–6–1	16,881
11	W	October 31, 1984	5–3	@ Hartford Whalers (1984–85)	4–6–1	10,152

November

Game	Result	Date	Score	Opponent	Record	Attendance
12	L	November 1, 1984	1–7	@ Boston Bruins (1984–85)	4–7–1	14,451
13	W	November 3, 1984	5–4	New York Islanders (1984–85)	5–7–1	15,267
14	W	November 6, 1984	5–3	Winnipeg Jets (1984–85)	6–7–1	13,384
15	L	November 10, 1984	0–1	Hartford Whalers (1984–85)	6–8–1	14,801
16	L	November 13, 1984	4–5 OT	Los Angeles Kings (1984–85)	6–9–1	14,280
17	W	November 14, 1984	7–3	@ St. Louis Blues (1984–85)	7–9–1	10,183
18	L	November 16, 1984	2–4	@ St. Louis Blues (1984–85)	7–10–1	12,162
19	W	November 18, 1984	5–3	@ Chicago Black Hawks (1984–85)	8–10–1	17,372
20	W	November 20, 1984	3–2 OT	Chicago Black Hawks (1984–85)	9–10–1	14,838
21	W	November 24, 1984	8–3	New York Rangers (1984–85)	10–10–1	15,017
22	W	November 25, 1984	3–2 OT	@ New York Rangers (1984–85)	11–10–1	17,419
23	L	November 27, 1984	2–9	Washington Capitals (1984–85)	11–11–1	14,973

December

Game	Result	Date	Score	Opponent	Record	Attendance
24	W	December 1, 1984	8–4	Hartford Whalers (1984–85)	12–11–1	14,268
25	T	December 3, 1984	3–3 OT	Boston Bruins (1984–85)	12–11–2	15,118
26	T	December 6, 1984	1–1 OT	@ Philadelphia Flyers (1984–85)	12–11–3	16,224
27	W	December 8, 1984	7–3	New Jersey Devils (1984–85)	13–11–3	13,717
28	T	December 9, 1984	4–4 OT	@ Buffalo Sabres (1984–85)	13–11–4	14,762
29	L	December 11, 1984	3–4	Vancouver Canucks (1984–85)	13–12–4	15,215
30	T	December 13, 1984	5–5 OT	@ Boston Bruins (1984–85)	13–12–5	12,578
31	L	December 15, 1984	3–8	@ New Jersey Devils (1984–85)	13–13–5	9,145
32	L	December 18, 1984	1–4	Washington Capitals (1984–85)	13–14–5	14,483
33	L	December 20, 1984	4–5	@ Detroit Red Wings (1984–85)	13–15–5	18,156
34	W	December 22, 1984	3–1	Buffalo Sabres (1984–85)	14–15–5	14,042
35	W	December 23, 1984	3–2 OT	@ Chicago Black Hawks (1984–85)	15–15–5	17,317
36	L	December 27, 1984	3–5	Montreal Canadiens (1984–85)	15–16–5	15,380
37	W	December 29, 1984	10–2	Pittsburgh Penguins (1984–85)	16–16–5	14,874
38	T	December 31, 1984	4–4 OT	@ Montreal Canadiens (1984–85)	16–16–6	18,091

January

Game	Result	Date	Score	Opponent	Record	Attendance
39	W	January 2, 1985	7–3	Hartford Whalers (1984–85)	17–16–6	14,752
40	W	January 4, 1985	5–3	@ Washington Capitals (1984–85)	18–16–6	15,525
41	W	January 5, 1985	8–3	@ Pittsburgh Penguins (1984–85)	19–16–6	11,939
42	L	January 8, 1985	0–4	Edmonton Oilers (1984–85)	19–17–6	15,360
43	W	January 11, 1985	4–0	Calgary Flames (1984–85)	20–17–6	14,730
44	W	January 13, 1985	5–2	Detroit Red Wings (1984–85)	21–17–6	14,027
45	L	January 15, 1985	1–2	Montreal Canadiens (1984–85)	21–18–6	15,380
46	W	January 19, 1985	4–3	Boston Bruins (1984–85)	22–18–6	15,358
47	T	January 22, 1985	2–2 OT	Toronto Maple Leafs (1984–85)	22–18–7	14,770
48	W	January 24, 1985	4–3	@ Montreal Canadiens (1984–85)	23–18–7	18,101
49	W	January 25, 1985	4–2	Buffalo Sabres (1984–85)	24–18–7	14,929
50	L	January 27, 1985	2–3	@ Buffalo Sabres (1984–85)	24–19–7	15,566
51	L	January 31, 1985	5–6	@ Boston Bruins (1984–85)	24–20–7	13,867

February

Game	Result	Date	Score	Opponent	Record	Attendance
52	L	February 2, 1985	3–6	@ Detroit Red Wings (1984–85)	24–21–7	17,204
53	W	February 3, 1985	5–1	Minnesota North Stars (1984–85)	25–21–7	15,100
54	L	February 7, 1985	4–5	Montreal Canadiens (1984–85)	25–22–7	15,370
55	T	February 9, 1985	2–2 OT	New Jersey Devils (1984–85)	25–22–8	15,058
56	W	February 10, 1985	10–4	@ Hartford Whalers (1984–85)	26–22–8	11,090
57	L	February 14, 1985	3–6	@ Philadelphia Flyers (1984–85)	26–23–8	16,925
58	W	February 16, 1985	8–1	@ Pittsburgh Penguins (1984–85)	27–23–8	11,311
59	W	February 17, 1985	4–3	@ Minnesota North Stars (1984–85)	28–23–8	14,303
60	W	February 19, 1985	7–6	Los Angeles Kings (1984–85)	29–23–8	15,326
61	L	February 22, 1985	3–6	@ Edmonton Oilers (1984–85)	29–24–8	17,498
62	W	February 23, 1985	7–5	@ Vancouver Canucks (1984–85)	30–24–8	11,053
63	W	February 27, 1985	5–2	@ Los Angeles Kings (1984–85)	31–24–8	11,719

March

Game	Result	Date	Score	Opponent	Record	Attendance
64	W	March 2, 1985	4–2	Philadelphia Flyers (1984–85)	32–24–8	15,352
65	W	March 5, 1985	6–4	Boston Bruins (1984–85)	33–24–8	15,345
66	L	March 8, 1985	3–6	@ Winnipeg Jets (1984–85)	33–25–8	13,918
67	T	March 9, 1985	2–2 OT	@ Calgary Flames (1984–85)	33–25–9	16,683
68	W	March 13, 1985	8–0	Minnesota North Stars (1984–85)	34–25–9	14,964
69	L	March 15, 1985	2–3 OT	Winnipeg Jets (1984–85)	34–26–9	15,182
70	W	March 18, 1985	8–4	@ Boston Bruins (1984–85)	35–26–9	13,515
71	W	March 21, 1985	5–1	@ New York Islanders (1984–85)	36–26–9	15,683
72	L	March 24, 1985	1–2	@ Hartford Whalers (1984–85)	36–27–9	10,440
73	W	March 26, 1985	4–3	Buffalo Sabres (1984–85)	37–27–9	15,327
74	W	March 28, 1985	4–2	New York Islanders (1984–85)	38–27–9	15,009
75	W	March 30, 1985	3–1	St. Louis Blues (1984–85)	39–27–9	15,362
76	L	March 31, 1985	1–3	@ Buffalo Sabres (1984–85)	39–28–9	16,433

April

Game	Result	Date	Score	Opponent	Record	Attendance
77	W	April 2, 1985	6–4	Boston Bruins (1984–85)	40–28–9	15,356
78	L	April 4, 1985	1–7	@ Montreal Canadiens (1984–85)	40–29–9	18,084
79	L	April 6, 1985	1–2	@ Hartford Whalers (1984–85)	40–30–9	12,730
80	W	April 7, 1985	4–1	Hartford Whalers (1984–85)	41–30–9	15,004

Legend: Win (2 points) Loss (0 points) Tie (1 point)

== Playoffs ==
The Nordiques opened the 1985 Stanley Cup playoffs with a best of five Adams Division semi-final series against the Buffalo Sabres. The Sabres finished the season in third place in the Adams Division with a 38–28–14 record, earning 90 points, one less than Quebec. The series began with two games at Le Colisée, and the Nordiques took care of business at home, winning the first game 5–2, followed by a close 3–2 victory in the second game to go up 2–0 in the series. The series moved to the Buffalo Memorial Auditorium for the third game, and the Sabres stayed alive in the series with a 6–4 win to cut the Nordiques series lead to 2–1. Buffalo easily handled the Nordiques in the fourth game at the Auditorium, winning 7–4, to even the series up at two games each, sending the series back to Quebec City for a deciding game five. The Nordiques and Sabres played a very close game, with Quebec winning 6–5, to win the series and advance to the Division finals.

Quebec then faced the Montreal Canadiens in the best-of-seven Adams Division Final. The Canadiens had a 41–27–12 record during the regular season, earning 94 points and finishing in first place in the Adams Division, three points ahead of the Nordiques. Montreal eliminated their rival, the Boston Bruins in five games in the first round of the playoffs. The series opened with two games at the Montreal Forum, however, it was Quebec who struck first, winning the first game 2–1 in overtime, before the Canadiens evened the series with a 6–4 in game two. The series moved to Le Colisée for the next two games, and the Nordiques once again took the series lead, winning the third game seven–6 in overtime to go up 2–1 in the series. The Canadiens responded in the fourth game, defeating Quebec 3–1 in game four to even the series up once again. In game five in Montreal, the Nordiques came out flying, easily defeating the Canadiens 5–1 to take a 3–2 series lead, have a chance to clinch it at home, and game six moving back to Quebec City. In game six, the Canadiens fought off elimination, defeating the Nordiques 5–2 to once again tie the series, forcing a seventh and deciding game at the Montreal Forum. In a very close game, the Nordiques and Canadiens were tied 2–2 after regulation time, forcing overtime, and in the extra period, Peter Šťastný scored the series clinching goal as Quebec stunned the Canadiens with a 3–2 victory, advancing to the Wales Conference finals for the second time in four seasons.

The Nordiques faced off against the Philadelphia Flyers in the best of seven Conference finals. The Flyers had the best record in the NHL, as they had a 53–20–7 record, earning 113 points, winning the Patrick Division by twelve points over the second place Washington Capitals. In the playoffs, Philadelphia swept the New York Rangers in three games, before defeating the New York Islanders in five games in the division finals. Since the Adams Division had a better head-to-head record against the Patrick Division, the Nordiques got home-ice advantage. The series began with two games at Le Colisée, as the Nordiques won a tough defensive battle in overtime by a score of 2–1 to take an early series lead. The Flyers evened the series with a 4–2 win in the second game. The series moved over to the Spectrum in Philadelphia, and the Flyers took a 2–1 series lead with another 4–2 victory in the third game. The Nordiques rebounded in the fourth game at the Spectrum, silencing the Flyers with a 5–3 win to even the series up at two wins each. The fifth game was played back in Quebec City, and the defensively tight Flyers squeaked out a 2–1 victory in the fifth game to return home with a 3–2 series lead. Philadelphia dominated the Nordiques in the sixth game, outshooting Quebec 36–15, en route to a 3–0 victory to win the series and advance to the 1985 Stanley Cup Final.

1985 Stanley Cup playoffs
Adams Division Semifinals vs. (A3) Buffalo Sabres – Nordiques win 3–2

Game	Date	Visitor	Score	Home	Series	Attendance
1	April 10	Buffalo Sabres	2–5	Quebec Nordiques	1-0	14,933
2	April 11	Buffalo Sabres	2–3	Quebec Nordiques	2-0	15,022
3	April 13	Quebec Nordiques	4–6	Buffalo Sabres	2-1	16,033
4	April 14	Quebec Nordiques	4–7	Buffalo Sabres	2-2	14,795
5	April 16	Buffalo Sabres	5–6	Quebec Nordiques	3-2	15,186

Adams Division Finals vs. (A1) Montreal Canadiens – Nordiques win 4–3

Game	Date	Visitor	Score	Home	Series	Attendance
1	April 18	Quebec Nordiques	2–1	Montreal Canadiens	1-0	17,123
2	April 21	Quebec Nordiques	4–6	Montreal Canadiens	1-1	18,075
3	April 23	Montreal Canadiens	6–7	Quebec Nordiques	2-1	15,345
4	April 25	Montreal Canadiens	3–1	Quebec Nordiques	2-2	15,369
5	April 27	Quebec Nordiques	5–1	Montreal Canadiens	3-2	18,076
6	April 30	Montreal Canadiens	5–2	Quebec Nordiques	3-3	15,354
7	May 2	Quebec Nordiques	3–2	Montreal Canadiens	4-3	18,076

Wales Conference Finals vs. (P1) Philadelphia Flyers – Flyers win 4–2

Game	Date	Visitor	Score	Home	Series	Attendance
1	May 5	Philadelphia Flyers	1–2	Quebec Nordiques	1-0	15,194
2	May 7	Philadelphia Flyers	4–2	Quebec Nordiques	1-1	15,231
3	May 9	Quebec Nordiques	2–4	Philadelphia Flyers	1-2	17,191
4	May 12	Quebec Nordiques	5–3	Philadelphia Flyers	2-2	17,191
5	May 14	Philadelphia Flyers	2–1	Quebec Nordiques	2-3	15,300
6	May 16	Quebec Nordiques	0–3	Philadelphia Flyers	2-4	17,191

Legend: Win Loss

== Player statistics ==
Regular season
Scoring

Player	Pos	GP	G	A	Pts	PIM	+/-	PPG	SHG	GWG
Peter Stastny	C	75	32	68	100	95	23	7	1	9
Michel Goulet	LW	69	55	40	95	55	10	17	0	6
Anton Stastny	LW	79	38	42	80	30	18	9	0	3
Dale Hunter	C	80	20	52	72	209	23	3	3	3
Brent Ashton	LW	49	27	24	51	38	18	6	1	2
Wilf Paiement	RW	68	23	28	51	165	12	2	1	4
Mario Marois	D	76	6	37	43	91	2	2	0	0
Paul Gillis	C	77	14	28	42	168	12	0	0	3
Jean-Francois Sauve	C	64	13	29	42	21	11	8	0	1
Bruce Bell	D	75	6	31	37	44	32	2	0	1
Alain Cote	LW	80	13	22	35	31	12	1	1	0
Brad Maxwell	D	50	7	24	31	119	22	1	0	1
Randy Moller	D	79	7	22	29	120	29	0	0	0
Pat Price	D	68	1	26	27	118	17	0	0	0
Normand Rochefort	D	73	3	21	24	74	12	1	0	1
Alain Lemieux	C	30	11	11	22	12	-1	2	0	2
Tony McKegney	LW	30	12	9	21	12	2	1	3	1
Marian Stastny	RW	50	7	14	21	4	1	0	0	1
Andre Savard	C	35	9	10	19	8	-3	1	1	1
Mark Kumpel	RW	42	8	7	15	26	4	1	0	0
Jean-Marc Gaulin	RW	22	3	3	6	8	2	0	0	0
Bo Berglund	RW	12	4	1	5	6	2	0	0	1
Luc Dufour	LW	30	2	3	5	27	-5	0	0	0
Jimmy Mann	RW	25	0	4	4	54	3	0	0	0
Peter Loob	D	8	1	2	3	0	5	0	0	0
Louis Sleigher	RW	6	1	2	3	0	-1	0	0	1
Dan Bouchard	G	29	0	2	2	2	0	0	0	0
Blake Wesley	D	21	0	2	2	28	-2	0	0	0
Gord Donnelly	D	22	0	0	0	33	1	0	0	0
Mario Gosselin	G	36	0	0	0	2	0	0	0	0
Wayne Groulx	C	1	0	0	0	0	0	0	0	0
Roger Hagglund	D	3	0	0	0	0	0	0	0	0
Claude Julien	D	1	0	0	0	0	0	0	0	0
Ed Lee	RW	2	0	0	0	5	-4	0	0	0
Richard Sevigny	G	20	0	0	0	8	0	0	0	0
David Shaw	D	14	0	0	0	11	-5	0	0	0
Yvon Vautour	RW	5	0	0	0	2	0	0	0	0

Goaltending

Player	MIN	GP	W	L	T	GA	GAA	SO
Mario Gosselin	1960	35	19	11	3	109	3.34	1
Dan Bouchard	1738	29	12	13	4	101	3.49	0
Richard Sevigny	1104	20	10	6	2	62	3.37	1
Team:	4802	80	41	30	9	272	3.40	2

Playoffs
Scoring

Player	Pos	GP	G	A	Pts	PIM	+/-	PPG	SHG	GWG
Peter Stastny	C	18	4	19	23	24	1	1	0	2
Michel Goulet	LW	17	11	10	21	17	3	7	0	0
Brad Maxwell	D	18	2	9	11	35	5	1	0	0
Brent Ashton	LW	18	6	4	10	13	-6	1	1	1
Alain Cote	LW	18	5	5	10	11	5	0	0	1
Jean-Francois Sauve	C	18	5	5	10	8	-6	2	0	0
Dale Hunter	C	17	4	6	10	97	0	0	1	2
Paul Gillis	C	18	1	7	8	73	1	0	0	0
Mario Marois	D	18	0	8	8	12	-9	0	0	0
Mark Kumpel	RW	18	3	4	7	4	4	0	0	1
Wilf Paiement	RW	18	4	2	6	58	-4	0	0	0
Alain Lemieux	C	14	3	3	6	0	2	2	0	0
Anton Stastny	LW	16	3	3	6	6	-3	1	0	1
Bruce Bell	D	16	2	2	4	21	-2	1	0	0
Randy Moller	D	18	2	2	4	40	3	1	0	0
Pat Price	D	17	0	4	4	51	4	0	0	0
Normand Rochefort	D	18	2	1	3	8	2	0	0	1
Mario Gosselin	G	17	0	2	2	2	0	0	0	0
Blake Wesley	D	6	1	0	1	8	-1	0	0	0
Dan Bouchard	G	1	0	0	0	4	0	0	0	0
Jean-Marc Gaulin	RW	1	0	0	0	0	0	0	0	0
Mike Hough	LW	2	0	0	0	0	0	0	0	0
Jimmy Mann	RW	13	0	0	0	41	1	0	0	0
Marian Stastny	RW	2	0	0	0	0	-1	0	0	0

Goaltending

Player	MIN	GP	W	L	GA	GAA	SO
Mario Gosselin	1059	17	9	8	54	3.06	0
Dan Bouchard	60	1	0	1	7	7.00	0
Team:	1119	18	9	9	61	3.27	0

Note:

Pos = Position;GP = Games played; G = Goals; A = Assists; Pts = Points; PIM = Penalty minutes; +/- = Plus/minus; PPG = Power-play goals; SHG = Short-handed goals; GWG = Game-winning goals
Pos = Position;GP = Games played; Min, TOI = Minutes played; W = Wins; L = Losses; T,T/OT = Ties; OTL = Overtime losses; GA = Goals-against; GAA = Goals-against average; SO = Shutouts; SA = Shots against; SV = Shots saved;SV% = Save percentage;

== Transactions ==
The Nordiques were involved in the following transactions during the 1984–85 season.

=== Trades ===
June 26, 1984	To St. Louis Blues Cash	To Quebec Nordiques Dan Wood; Richard Zemlak
July 6, 1984	To Detroit Red Wings Frantisek Cernik	To Quebec Nordiques Cash
October 25, 1984	To Boston Bruins Louis Sleigher	To Quebec Nordiques Luc Dufour; 4th-round pick in 1985 – Peter Massey
December 6, 1984	To Pittsburgh Penguins Brian Ford	To Quebec Nordiques Tom Thornbury
December 14, 1984	To Minnesota North Stars Tony McKegney; Bo Berglund	To Quebec Nordiques Brad Maxwell; Brent Ashton
January 29, 1985	To St. Louis Blues Luc Dufour	To Quebec Nordiques Alain Lemieux

=== Waivers ===
October 9, 1984	To New York Rangers Andre Dore
October 9, 1984	To Hartford Whalers Wally Weir
January 25, 1985	To New Jersey Devils Michel Bolduc

=== Free agents ===
Player / Former team; Richard Sevigny / Montreal Canadiens	Player / New team; Rick Lapointe / Los Angeles Kings

== Draft picks ==
Quebec's draft picks from the 1984 NHL entry draft which was held at the Montreal Forum in Montreal.

Round	#	Player	Nationality	College/junior/club team (league)
1	15	Trevor Stienburg	Canada	Guelph Platers (OHL)
2	36	Jeff Brown	Canada	Sudbury Wolves (OHL)
3	57	Steven Finn	Canada	Laval Voisins (QMJHL )
4	78	Terry Perkins	Canada	Portland Winterhawks (WHL)
6	120	Darren Cota	Canada	Kelowna Wings (WHL)
7	141	Henrik Cedergren	Sweden	Brynäs IF Gävle (Sweden)
8	162	Jyrki Maki	Finland	Simley High School (USHS)
9	183	Guy Ouellette	Canada	Quebec Remparts (QMJHL)
10	203	Ken Quinney	Canada	Calgary Wranglers (WHL)
12	244	Peter Loob	Sweden	Södertälje SK (Sweden)

== Farm teams ==
- Fredericton Express (AHL)

== See also ==
- 1984–85 NHL season
