= 1984–85 Chicago Black Hawks season =

National Hockey League team season

1984–85 Chicago Black Hawks
- Division: 2nd Norris
- Conference: 5th Campbell
- 1984–85 record: 38–35–7
- Home record: 22–16–2
- Road record: 16–19–5
- Goals for: 309
- Goals against: 299

Team information
- General manager: Bob Pulford
- Coach: Orval Tessier; Bob Pulford
- Captain: Darryl Sutter
- Alternate captains: None
- Arena: Chicago Stadium

Team leaders
- Goals: Steve Larmer (46)
- Assists: Denis Savard (67)
- Points: Denis Savard (105)
- Penalty minutes: Al Secord (193)
- Wins: Murray Bannerman (27)
- Goals against average: Warren Skorodenski (3.22)

The 1984–85 Chicago Black Hawks season was the 59th season of the Hawks' existence.

== Offseason ==
Long-time goalie Tony Esposito retired from the team after a 16-year career in the NHL. Esposito had been with the Black Hawks for 15 of those years, appearing in 873 games, and earning a 418–302–147 record with a 2.93 GAA and 74 shutouts.

On June 9, the Black Hawks traded away goaltender Bob Janecyk, their first-round, sixth overall pick, as well as their third- and fourth-round draft picks in the 1984 NHL entry draft to the Los Angeles Kings in exchange for the Kings first-round, third overall draft pick and their fourth-round pick in the draft. By moving up three spots in the draft, the Black Hawks drafted local prospect Ed Olczyk. Olczyk, born in Chicago, spent the 1983–84 season playing with the U.S. National Team, scoring 21 goals and 68 points in 62 games. At the 1984 Winter Olympics, Olczyk scored two goals and seven points in six games for the USA.

On June 19, the Hawks traded away defenceman Don Dietrich, forward Rich Preston and future considerations to the New Jersey Devils for forward Bob MacMillan and future considerations. MacMillan appeared in 71 games for the Devils in 1983–84, scoring 17 goals and 40 points. He was a former winner of the Lady Byng Trophy in 1979 while playing for the Atlanta Flames.

== Regular season ==
The Black Hawks started the season off with a solid 9–6–2 record in their first 17 games, which had the team in first place in the Norris Division. The Hawks slumped to a 13–22–1 record over the next 36 games, dropping them to a 22–28–3 record overall, and into second place in the division. Following a 6–4 loss to the St. Louis Blues on February 3, the team fired head coach Orval Tessier, as he was replaced with general manager Bob Pulford. Under Pulford, the Black Hawks finished the season on a 16–7–4 run in last 27 games, finishing the season 38–35–7, earning 83 points and second place in the division. This was a 15-point improvement over the 1983–84 season, as the club qualified for the post-season for the sixteenth consecutive season.

Chicago was led offensively by Denis Savard, who scored 38 goals and a team high 105 points in 79 games. Steve Larmer led the club with 46 goals, and was second in points with 86 while appearing in all 80 games. Rookie Ed Olczyk had 20 goals and 50 points in 70 games. Al Secord led the Black Hawks in penalty minutes, getting 193 in only 51 games.

On defence, Doug Wilson scored 22 goals and 76 points in 78 games to lead the blueline in scoring. He also had a team high +23 rating. Bob Murray had five goals and 43 points in 80 games, while Behn Wilson scored 10 goals and 33 points in 76 games, as well as earning 185 penalty minutes.

In the net, Murray Bannerman appeared in a club high 60 games, earning a 27–25–4 record with a 3.83 GAA and a .884 save percentage. Warren Skorodenski backed him up, earning a record of 11–9–3 in 27 games, with a 3.22 GAA and a league leading save percentage of .903. He also earned two shutouts.

=== Final standings ===
Norris Division
	GP	W	L	T	GF	GA	Pts
**St. Louis Blues**	80	37	31	12	299	288	86
**Chicago Black Hawks**	80	38	35	7	309	299	83
**Detroit Red Wings**	80	27	41	12	313	357	66
**Minnesota North Stars**	80	25	43	12	268	321	62
Toronto Maple Leafs	80	20	52	8	253	358	48

Note: GP = Games played, W = Wins, L = Losses, T = Ties, Pts = Points, GF = Goals for, GA = Goals against
Note: Teams that qualified for the playoffs are highlighted in bold.

=== Record vs. opponents ===
Norris Division record vs. opponents

==== Vs. Campbell Conference ====
**Vs. Norris Division**

1984–85 NHL records
Team	**CHI**	**DET**	**MIN**	**STL**	**TOR**	**Total**
Chicago	—	3−3−2	4−3−1	3−4−1	6−1−1	**16−11−5**
Detroit	3−3−2	—	3−2−3	1−6−1	5−3	**12−14−6**
Minnesota	3−4−1	2−3−3	—	1−6−1	6−2	**12−15−5**
St. Louis	4−3−1	6−1−1	6−1−1	—	4−3−1	**20−8−4**
Toronto	1−6−1	3−5	2−6	3−4−1	—	**9−21−2**

**Vs. Smythe Division**

1984–85 NHL records
Team	**CGY**	**EDM**	**LAK**	**VAN**	**WIN**	**Total**
Chicago	2−1	0−3	2−0−1	2−1	1−1−1	**7−6−2**
Detroit	1−2	0−3	1−2	2−1	0−2−1	**4−10−1**
Minnesota	0−1−2	0−3	1−1−1	1−1−1	1−2	**3−8−4**
St. Louis	3−0	0−3	2−1	3−0	1−0−2	**9−4−2**
Toronto	0−3	0−2−1	1−2	1−1−1	0−3	**2−11−2**

**Vs. Wales Conference**

**Vs. Adams Division**

1984–85 NHL records
Team	**BOS**	**BUF**	**HFD**	**MTL**	**QUE**	**Total**
Chicago	3−0	0−3	1−2	2−1	0−3	**6−9−0**
Detroit	0−3	1−1−1	1−2	1−1−1	2−1	**5−8−2**
Minnesota	0−3	0−3	2−1	2−1	0−3	**4−11−0**
St. Louis	0−1−2	2−1	1−2	0−2−1	1−2	**4−8−3**
Toronto	1−2	1−2	1−2	3−0	0−1−2	**6−7−2**

**Vs. Patrick Division**

1984–85 NHL records
Team	**NJD**	**NYI**	**NYR**	**PHI**	**PIT**	**WSH**	**Total**
Chicago	3−0	0−3	3−0	1−2	2−1	0−3	**9−9−0**
Detroit	1−1−1	1−2	2−1	0−2−1	1−1−1	1−2	**6−9−3**
Minnesota	1−1−1	1−1−1	2−1	0−3	2−1	0−2−1	**6−9−3**
St. Louis	2−0−1	0−3	0−2−1	0−3	2−1	0−2−1	**4−11−3**
Toronto	0−3	1−2	0−2−1	1−2	1−2	0−2−1	**3−13−2**

== Playoffs ==
=== Chicago Black Hawks 3, Detroit Red Wings 0 ===
The Black Hawks opened the 1985 Stanley Cup playoffs against the Detroit Red Wings. Detroit finished the regular season with a 27–41–12 record, earning 66 points, which was 17 fewer points than Chicago, and third place in the Norris Division.

The series opened on April 10 at Chicago Stadium, and Doug Wilson opened the scoring for the Black Hawks 4:26 into the game on the power play. Curt Fraser then scored 21 seconds later, giving Chicago a very early 2–0 lead. Denis Savard and Ken Yaremchuk scored two more goals, giving Chicago a 4–0 lead in the first period, before the Red Wings Bob Manno scored with 29 seconds remaining in the period, cutting the Hawks lead to 4–1. In the second period, Jack O'Callahan scored for the Hawks 17 seconds into the period, restoring the Hawks four-goal lead, however, the Wings Reed Larson scored three minutes later, making the score 5–2. The Black Hawks then erupted for three goals, as Behn Wilson, Ed Olczyk and Steve Larmer scored, making it 8–2 for Chicago. John Ogrodnick answered for Detroit in the final minute of the period, making the score 8–3 for the Hawks after two periods. In the third period, Ed Olczyk scored his second goal of the game, making it 9–3 for Chicago, however, the Wings scored twice before the game ended, making the final score a 9–5 Black Hawks victory.

In the second game at home, the Hawks got off to another quick start, scoring three goals in the first period, as Darryl Sutter, Ken Yaremchuk and Al Secord scored to make it 3–0 for Chicago after the first period. After a scoreless second period, Curt Fraser scored early in the third period, making it 4–0, before the Wings Joey Kocur responded with a goal of his own, cutting the lead to 4–1. The Hawks Keith Brown and Doug Wilson scored to cap off a 6–1 victory, and gave Chicago a 2–0 series lead.

The third game shifted to Joe Louis Arena in Detroit, and the Black Hawks opened the scoring once again, as Steve Ludzik scored the lone first period goal in the game, giving Chicago a 1–0 lead. The Hawks extended their lead to 4–0, after goals by Steve Larmer, Darryl Sutter and Denis Savard in a 2:56 span midway through the second period. Ron Duguay responded for the Red Wings, cutting the Hawks lead to 4–1 after two periods. In the third period, the Hawks extended their lead to 7–1 after goals by Ed Olczyk, Denis Savard and Behn Wilson. Steve Yzerman scored late in the third period, making it 7–2 for Chicago, however, Rick Paterson restored the six-goal lead for the Hawks, who won the game by a score of 8–2, and swept the Red Wings in embarrassing fashion, outscoring them 23–8 in three games.

=== Chicago Black Hawks 4, Minnesota North Stars 2 ===
The Black Hawks met the Minnesota North Stars in the Norris Division finals. The North Stars struggled in the regular season, finishing with a 25–43–12 record, earning 62 points, which placed them fourth in the division. In the first round of the playoffs, the North Stars upset the first place St. Louis Blues, sweeping them out of the playoffs. In the 1984 Stanley Cup playoffs, the North Stars defeated Chicago in the first round.

The series opened at Chicago Stadium, and the Black Hawks took a 3–0 lead just 5:43 into the game after goals by Ed Olczyk, Doug Wilson and Tom Lysiak. The North Stars responded with two goals of their own, cutting the Hawks lead to 3–2 after the first period. In the second period, Minnesota scored four goals, taking a 6–3 lead. In the third period, Jack O'Callahan scored for the Hawks, cutting the lead to 6–4, however, Steve Payne restored the three-goal lead for the North Stars. The Hawks Behn Wilson scored with just under five minutes remaining in the third period, however, Tony McKegney scored an empty net goal with five seconds remaining, as the North Stars won the opening game 8–5.

In the second game, the teams played a scoreless first period. The goals came quick in the second period though, as Keith Brown and Ken Yaremchuk scored 15 seconds apart, giving Chicago a 2–0 lead. The North Stars Dino Ciccarelli and Tony McKegney scored two goals just a minute apart, tying the game 2-2, however, the Hawks Curt Fraser scored 11 seconds after McKegney's game tying goal, restoring the Hawks lead to 3–2. Fraser added another goal later in the period, as did Al Secord, as the Hawks took a 5–2 lead. In the third period, Troy Murray scored the lone goal, capping off a 6-2 Black Hawks victory. After struggling in the first game of the series, Murray Bannerman made 25 saves for the victory.

The series moved to the Met Center in Bloomington, Minnesota for the next two games. In game three, Minnesota got off to a quick start, scoring two goals in the first 9:53 of the game to take a 2–0 lead. Bob Murray responded for Chicago, cutting the North Stars lead to 2–1, then Tom Lysiak tied the game late in the period. In the second period, Al Secord scored two goals 2:08 apart late in the period, giving the Black Hawks a 4–2 lead. Craig Hartsburg scored early in the third for the North Stars, cutting the Hawks lead to 4–3, however, Murray Bannerman made a number of good saves, and a late empty goal by Darryl Sutter finished off the 5–3 victory for Chicago, and the Hawks took a 2–1 series lead.

In the fourth game, the Hawks Steve Larmer scored 1:11 into the game, however, Minnesota tied it up on a goal by Ron Wilson. Chicago retook the lead on a goal by Denis Savard, but the North Stars tied it up again only 16 seconds later on a goal by Randy Velischek. Ed Olczyk gave Chicago the lead for the third time in the period, as the Hawks held on to a 3–2 lead after the first. In the second period, Tom Lysiak extended the Hawks lead to 4–2, however, the North Stars Craig Hartsburg and Randy Velischek scored two late period goals, tying the game at 4-4. Minnesota took their first lead of the game early in the third period on a goal by Gordie Roberts, however, Bill Gardner tied it up for the Black Hawks midway through the period. The North Stars retook the lead on a goal by Tony McKegney just over two minutes later, but Denis Savard tied it up at 6–6 as he scored 47 seconds later, sending the game to overtime. In the first overtime, the teams were held off the score sheet, with the Hawks outshooting Minnesota 8–7 in a very evenly played period. Early in the second overtime, Darryl Sutter scored the game-winning goal for the Black Hawks, as they won the game 7–6, and took a 3–1 series lead.

The series shifted back to Chicago for the fifth game, and in the first period, it was all Black Hawks, as Denis Savard and Darryl Sutter scored to take a 2–0 lead after the first 20 minutes. In the second period, Chicago extended their lead to 4–0 after goals by Al Secord and Steve Larmer. Minnesota responded with two goals of their own, as Tony McKegney and Brian Bellows cut the Hawks lead to 4–2. In the third period, Dino Ciccarelli scored midway through the period for Minnesota, cutting the lead to 4–3, then with just over three minutes remaining in the period, Tony McKegney tied the game for Minnesota. In overtime, the North Stars completed the comeback on a goal by Dennis Maruk, winning the game 5–4, and cutting the Hawks series lead to 3–2.

In game six back in Minnesota, Tony McKegney gave the North Stars an early 1–0 lead, however, Steve Larmer tied the game 45 seconds later. Craig Hartsburg restored the North Stars lead, but Darryl Sutter tied the game once again with a late period goal, making it 2–2 after the first period. The North Stars took the lead again on a goal by Dennis Maruk, however, the Hawks tied it up again three minutes later after a goal by Tom Lysiak. In the third period, Minnesota took a 4–3 lead on a goal by Dave Richter, only to have Chicago tie it up nearly two minutes later on a Curt Fraser goal. Minnesota took the lead for the fifth time in the game midway through the third period on a goal by Keith Acton, but Chicago tied the game again after a Troy Murray goal with under five minutes left, sending the game into overtime for the third consecutive game. In the extra period, Darryl Sutter scored with just under five minutes remaining, winning the game for the Black Hawks 6–5, and the series 4 games to 2.

=== Edmonton Oilers 4, Chicago Black Hawks 2 ===
The Black Hawks advanced to the Campbell Conference finals for the second time in three years. In the 1983 Stanley Cup playoffs, the Black Hawks faced the Edmonton Oilers in the conference finals, and were swept by Edmonton in four games. Edmonton, who won the Stanley Cup in 1984, finished the 1984–85 season with a 49–20–11 record, earning 109 points, which was 26 more than the Black Hawks. In the post-season, the Oilers swept the Los Angeles Kings in the first round, then swept the Winnipeg Jets in the Smythe Division final.

The series opened up at Northlands Coliseum in Edmonton, Alberta, and the Oilers took a 2–0 lead midway through the first period after goals by Glenn Anderson and Charlie Huddy. The Hawks Ken Yaremchuk cut the Oilers lead to 2–1 with a goal, however, Paul Coffey scored for Edmonton, as they took a 3–1 lead after the first period. In the second period, the Oilers scored four goals on only nine shots, as they took a 7–1 lead, as Jari Kurri scored twice, Charlie Huddy scored his second goal of the game, and Mark Napier also scored. In the third period, the Oilers continue to pummel the Black Hawks, as they took a lead of 11–1 after goals by Willy Lindstrom, Wayne Gretzky, Pat Hughes, and Glenn Anderson. Troy Murray scored a late goal for Chicago, making the final score 11–2 for the Oilers, who took a 1–0 series lead.

In the second game, the Oilers took an early 1–0 lead after a Glenn Anderson goal, however, Chicago tied it up with a Bob Murray goal. Edmonton retook the lead when Jari Kurri scored, taking a 2–1 lead after the first period. The Black Hawks tied it up just over five minutes into the second period on a goal by Darryl Sutter, however, Edmonton responded with a goal of their own by Larry Melnyk, making it 3–2 for the Oilers after two periods. In the third, Jari Kurri scored midway through the period, followed by a Paul Coffey goal with just under five minutes left, giving Edmonton a 5–2 lead. The Hawks Behn Wilson scored with 38 seconds remaining, making it 5–3 for the Oilers. Then, Edmonton scored two empty net goals, one by Jari Kurri to complete the hat trick, and another by Glenn Anderson, as they won the game 7–3 and took a 2–0 series lead.

With the series shifting to Chicago for the third game, the Black Hawks took a 2–0 lead after the first period on goals by Jack O'Callahan and Steve Larmer. The Oilers cut the Hawks lead to 2–1 after a goal by Jaroslav Pouzar, but Darryl Sutter scored just over three minutes later, giving Chicago a 3–1 lead. Mark Messier scored for the Oilers early in the third period, cutting the Hawks lead to 3–2, however, Denis Savard scored four minutes later, followed by an empty net goal by Troy Murray, as the Black Hawks defeated the Oilers 5–2, cutting Edmonton's series lead to 2–1.

There was a lot of scoring to open the fourth game of the series, as Wayne Gretzky scored 2:52 into the game, giving the Oilers a 1–0 lead. The Hawks Darryl Sutter and Ed Olczyk scored twice, giving Chicago a 2–1 lead, however, Mark Messier tied the game midway through the period. Denis Savard regained the lead for Chicago on a goal with just under three minutes left in the period, however, Jaroslav Pouzar tied it up for Edmonton just 15 seconds later. Only 57 seconds later, Curt Fraser scored for the Hawks, as they took a 4–3 lead, then Al Secord scored with 25 seconds left in the first period, making it 5-3 Chicago. In the second period, Willy Lindstrom got the Oilers within one, making it 5–4, however, just under three minutes after his goal, Steve Larmer scored for Chicago, giving them a 6–4 lead after two periods. The Hawks extended their lead to 8-4 early in the third after goals by Steve Larmer and Bob Murray, however, the Oilers made the game interesting with goals by Glenn Anderson and Mark Messier late in the third period. The Black Hawks hung on for the 8–6 victory, and tied the series at 2-2.

Back in Edmonton for the fifth game, Mike Krushelnyski scored for Edmonton just 1:11 into the game, giving them a 1–0 lead. Troy Murray tied it up just over three minutes later, but Edmonton took the lead again on a Jari Kurri goal. The Black Hawks tied it up again just over a minute later on a goal by Darryl Sutter, then Chicago took their first lead of the game on a Steve Larmer goal to make it 3-2 Chicago. Jari Kurri scored his second goal of the game just over two minutes later, tying the score at 3–3 after the first period. In the second, Denis Savard made it 4-3 for the Hawks 4:30 into the period, however, Mark Messier tied the game 21 seconds later. Wayne Gretzky gave the Oilers the lead three and a half minutes later, then before the end of the period, Gretzky scored again, and Jari Kurri earned his second hat trick in as many games, as Edmonton took a 7–4 lead. The Oilers continue to dominate in the third period, as they took a 10–4 lead after goals by Paul Coffey, Dave Hunter, and Lee Fogolin. Darryl Sutter scored late in the game for the Black Hawks, as the Oilers won the game 10–5, and took a 3–2 series lead.

In the sixth game back in Chicago, the Oilers took a 2–0 lead into the first intermission after goals by Jari Kurri and Mark Messier. Edmonton continued their dominance in the second period, as Jari Kurri scored twice, earning his third hat trick in as many games, as well as goals by Mark Messier and Lee Fogolin gave the Oilers a 6–0 lead after two periods. In the third, Al Secord and Ken Yaremchuk scored for Chicago, cutting the Oilers lead to 6–2, however, Glenn Anderson and Jari Kurri, who scored his fourth goal of the game, capped off an 8-2 Oilers victory, eliminating the Black Hawks from the playoffs.

== Schedule and results ==
=== Regular season ===
1984–85 regular season
October

Game	Result	Date	Score	Opponent	Record
1	W	October 11, 1984	7–3	Detroit Red Wings (1984–85)	1–0–0
2	L	October 13, 1984	6–7 OT	@ New York Islanders (1984–85)	1–1–0
3	L	October 14, 1984	3–5	Washington Capitals (1984–85)	1–2–0
4	W	October 17, 1984	4–3	St. Louis Blues (1984–85)	2–2–0
5	L	October 20, 1984	4–7	@ Detroit Red Wings (1984–85)	2–3–0
6	W	October 21, 1984	5–2	Los Angeles Kings (1984–85)	3–3–0
7	W	October 24, 1984	9–3	Vancouver Canucks (1984–85)	4–3–0
8	W	October 27, 1984	5–4	@ St. Louis Blues (1984–85)	5–3–0
9	L	October 28, 1984	1–4	Hartford Whalers (1984–85)	5–4–0
10	T	October 30, 1984	5–5 OT	@ Minnesota North Stars (1984–85)	5–4–1

November

Game	Result	Date	Score	Opponent	Record
11	L	November 2, 1984	2–4	@ Edmonton Oilers (1984–85)	5–5–1
12	L	November 3, 1984	4–6	@ Vancouver Canucks (1984–85)	5–6–1
13	W	November 5, 1984	3–2	@ Los Angeles Kings (1984–85)	6–6–1
14	W	November 7, 1984	5–3	@ Calgary Flames (1984–85)	7–6–1
15	T	November 10, 1984	4–4 OT	@ Toronto Maple Leafs (1984–85)	7–6–2
16	W	November 14, 1984	6–4	New York Rangers (1984–85)	8–6–2
17	W	November 17, 1984	7–0	@ Hartford Whalers (1984–85)	9–6–2
18	L	November 18, 1984	3–5	Quebec Nordiques (1984–85)	9–7–2
19	L	November 20, 1984	2–3 OT	@ Quebec Nordiques (1984–85)	9–8–2
20	L	November 22, 1984	2–3	@ Montreal Canadiens (1984–85)	9–9–2
21	W	November 24, 1984	2–1	@ Boston Bruins (1984–85)	10–9–2
22	L	November 25, 1984	0–5	@ Washington Capitals (1984–85)	10–10–2
23	L	November 27, 1984	2–4	@ Philadelphia Flyers (1984–85)	10–11–2
24	W	November 29, 1984	6–3	@ Pittsburgh Penguins (1984–85)	11–11–2

December

Game	Result	Date	Score	Opponent	Record
25	W	December 1, 1984	5–3	@ New Jersey Devils (1984–85)	12–11–2
26	T	December 5, 1984	5–5 OT	Los Angeles Kings (1984–85)	12–11–3
27	L	December 7, 1984	4–5	@ Detroit Red Wings (1984–85)	12–12–3
28	W	December 9, 1984	7–2	Toronto Maple Leafs (1984–85)	13–12–3
29	W	December 12, 1984	5–1	Detroit Red Wings (1984–85)	14–12–3
30	W	December 15, 1984	5–3	@ Minnesota North Stars (1984–85)	15–12–3
31	L	December 16, 1984	3–5	Minnesota North Stars (1984–85)	15–13–3
32	L	December 19, 1984	3–6	Buffalo Sabres (1984–85)	15–14–3
33	W	December 21, 1984	4–3	Toronto Maple Leafs (1984–85)	16–14–3
34	L	December 23, 1984	2–3 OT	Quebec Nordiques (1984–85)	16–15–3
35	L	December 26, 1984	3–4	@ St. Louis Blues (1984–85)	16–16–3
36	W	December 29, 1984	5–4	@ Toronto Maple Leafs (1984–85)	17–16–3
37	L	December 30, 1984	2–5	Calgary Flames (1984–85)	17–17–3

January

Game	Result	Date	Score	Opponent	Record
38	W	January 2, 1985	3–2	Montreal Canadiens (1984–85)	18–17–3
39	L	January 5, 1985	3–4	@ Hartford Whalers (1984–85)	18–18–3
40	L	January 6, 1985	2–3	St. Louis Blues (1984–85)	18–19–3
41	W	January 9, 1985	4–3	Minnesota North Stars (1984–85)	19–19–3
42	L	January 10, 1985	1–6	@ Philadelphia Flyers (1984–85)	19–20–3
43	L	January 13, 1985	5–6	New York Islanders (1984–85)	19–21–3
44	W	January 16, 1985	6–3	Winnipeg Jets (1984–85)	20–21–3
45	L	January 18, 1985	3–4	@ Buffalo Sabres (1984–85)	20–22–3
46	L	January 19, 1985	4–5	@ Pittsburgh Penguins (1984–85)	20–23–3
47	W	January 21, 1985	7–2	Minnesota North Stars (1984–85)	21–23–3
48	L	January 23, 1985	2–3	Washington Capitals (1984–85)	21–24–3
49	W	January 26, 1985	5–2	@ Toronto Maple Leafs (1984–85)	22–24–3
50	L	January 27, 1985	2–6	Toronto Maple Leafs (1984–85)	22–25–3
51	L	January 30, 1985	3–6	Winnipeg Jets (1984–85)	22–26–3

February

Game	Result	Date	Score	Opponent	Record
52	L	February 2, 1985	1–5	@ St. Louis Blues (1984–85)	22–27–3
53	L	February 3, 1985	4–6	St. Louis Blues (1984–85)	22–28–3
54	W	February 6, 1985	3–2	Toronto Maple Leafs (1984–85)	23–28–3
55	W	February 9, 1985	6–5	@ Boston Bruins (1984–85)	24–28–3
56	W	February 10, 1985	4–3	Boston Bruins (1984–85)	25–28–3
57	W	February 14, 1985	5–4	Pittsburgh Penguins (1984–85)	26–28–3
58	L	February 16, 1985	4–7	@ Detroit Red Wings (1984–85)	26–29–3
59	T	February 17, 1985	4–4 OT	Detroit Red Wings (1984–85)	26–29–4
60	W	February 20, 1985	3–2	Montreal Canadiens (1984–85)	27–29–4
61	L	February 22, 1985	1–4	@ Minnesota North Stars (1984–85)	27–30–4
62	W	February 24, 1985	3–2	Detroit Red Wings (1984–85)	28–30–4
63	W	February 25, 1985	4–3 OT	@ Toronto Maple Leafs (1984–85)	29–30–4
64	W	February 27, 1985	6–3	New Jersey Devils (1984–85)	30–30–4

March

Game	Result	Date	Score	Opponent	Record
65	T	March 2, 1985	4–4 OT	@ St. Louis Blues (1984–85)	30–30–5
66	W	March 3, 1985	5–2	St. Louis Blues (1984–85)	31–30–5
67	W	March 6, 1985	5–4	@ Minnesota North Stars (1984–85)	32–30–5
68	L	March 8, 1985	2–7	@ Buffalo Sabres (1984–85)	32–31–5
69	L	March 10, 1985	2–3	Minnesota North Stars (1984–85)	32–32–5
70	W	March 11, 1985	4–3 OT	@ New York Rangers (1984–85)	33–32–5
71	L	March 13, 1985	3–4	New York Islanders (1984–85)	33–33–5
72	W	March 17, 1985	6–4	@ Vancouver Canucks (1984–85)	34–33–5
73	L	March 20, 1985	4–6	@ Edmonton Oilers (1984–85)	34–34–5
74	W	March 22, 1985	3–1	@ Calgary Flames (1984–85)	35–34–5
75	W	March 27, 1985	5–2	Philadelphia Flyers (1984–85)	36–34–5
76	T	March 29, 1985	5–5 OT	@ Winnipeg Jets (1984–85)	36–34–6
77	L	March 31, 1985	3–7	Edmonton Oilers (1984–85)	36–35–6

April

Game	Result	Date	Score	Opponent	Record
78	W	April 3, 1985	5–0	New Jersey Devils (1984–85)	37–35–6
79	T	April 6, 1985	2–2 OT	@ Detroit Red Wings (1984–85)	37–35–7
80	W	April 7, 1985	3–1	New York Rangers (1984–85)	38–35–7

Legend: Win (2 points) Loss (0 points) Tie (1 point)

=== Playoffs ===
1985 Stanley Cup playoffs
Norris Division Semifinals vs. (N4) Detroit Red Wings – Blackhawks win 3–0

Game	Date	Visitor	Score	Home	Series
1	April 10	Detroit Red Wings	5–9	Chicago Black Hawks	1–0
2	April 11	Detroit Red Wings	1–6	Chicago Black Hawks	2–0
3	April 13	Chicago Black Hawks	8–2	Detroit Red Wings	3–0

Norris Division Semifinals vs. (N4) Minnesota North Stars – Blackhawks win 4–2

Game	Date	Visitor	Score	Home	Series
1	April 18	Minnesota North Stars	8–5	Chicago Black Hawks	0–1
2	April 21	Minnesota North Stars	2–6	Chicago Black Hawks	1–1
3	April 23	Chicago Black Hawks	5–3	Minnesota North Stars	2–1
4	April 25	Chicago Black Hawks	7–6	Minnesota North Stars	3–1
5	April 28	Minnesota North Stars	5–4	Chicago Black Hawks	3–2
6	April 30	Chicago Black Hawks	6–5	Minnesota North Stars	4–2

Campbell Conference Finals vs. (S1) Edmonton Oilers – Oilers win 4–2

Game	Date	Visitor	Score	Home	Series
1	May 4	Chicago Black Hawks	2–11	Edmonton Oilers	0–1
2	May 7	Chicago Black Hawks	3–7	Edmonton Oilers	0–2
3	May 9	Edmonton Oilers	2–5	Chicago Black Hawks	1–2
4	May 12	Edmonton Oilers	6–8	Chicago Black Hawks	2–2
5	May 14	Chicago Black Hawks	5–10	Edmonton Oilers	2–3
6	May 16	Edmonton Oilers	8–2	Chicago Black Hawks	2–4

Legend: Win Loss

== Player stats ==
=== Regular season ===
Scoring

Player	Pos	GP	G	A	Pts	PIM	+/-	PPG	SHG	GWG
Denis Savard	C	79	38	67	105	56	16	7	0	1
Steve Larmer	RW	80	46	40	86	16	17	14	0	6
Doug Wilson	D	78	22	54	76	44	23	7	0	2
Troy Murray	C	80	26	40	66	82	16	6	4	5
Bill Gardner	C	74	17	34	51	12	7	5	1	1
Curt Fraser	LW	73	25	25	50	109	3	4	0	5
Ed Olczyk	C	70	20	30	50	67	11	1	1	2
Tom Lysiak	C	74	16	30	46	13	-16	2	0	4
Bob Murray	D	80	5	38	43	56	13	4	0	1
Darryl Sutter	LW	49	20	18	38	12	8	2	0	2
Behn Wilson	D	76	10	23	33	185	5	2	0	1
Steve Ludzik	C	79	11	20	31	86	5	0	1	1
Al Secord	LW	51	15	11	26	193	0	6	0	2
Ken Yaremchuk	C	63	10	16	26	16	-6	2	0	0
Keith Brown	D	56	1	22	23	55	2	0	0	0
Rick Paterson	C	79	7	12	19	25	6	0	3	1
Jack O'Callahan	D	66	6	8	14	105	6	0	0	1
Jerome Dupont	D	55	3	10	13	105	5	0	0	1
Bob MacMillan	RW	36	5	7	12	12	-16	0	0	1
Dan Frawley	RW	30	4	3	7	64	-2	0	0	1
Marc Bergevin	D	60	0	6	6	54	-9	0	0	0
Dave Feamster	D	16	1	3	4	14	5	0	0	0
Tom McMurchy	RW	15	1	2	3	13	-1	0	0	0
Murray Bannerman	G	60	0	1	1	8	0	0	0	0
Wayne Presley	RW	3	0	1	1	0	1	0	0	0
Randy Boyd	D	3	0	0	0	6	0	0	0	0
Chris Clifford	G	1	0	0	0	0	0	0	0	0
Jeff Larmer	LW	7	0	0	0	0	1	0	0	0
Darren Pang	G	1	0	0	0	0	0	0	0	0
Warren Skorodenski	G	27	0	0	0	2	0	0	0	0

Goaltending

Player	MIN	GP	W	L	T	GA	GAA	SO
Murray Bannerman	3371	60	27	25	4	215	3.83	0
Warren Skorodenski	1396	27	11	9	3	75	3.22	2
Chris Clifford	20	1	0	0	0	0	0.00	0
Darren Pang	60	1	0	1	0	4	4.00	0
Team:	4847	80	38	35	7	294	3.64	2

=== Playoffs ===
Scoring

Player	Pos	GP	G	A	Pts	PIM	+/-	PPG	SHG	GWG
Denis Savard	C	15	9	20	29	20	4	3	0	0
Steve Larmer	RW	15	9	13	22	14	2	5	0	1
Darryl Sutter	LW	15	12	7	19	12	7	2	0	4
Troy Murray	C	15	5	14	19	24	-5	1	0	0
Al Secord	LW	15	7	9	16	42	-2	1	0	1
Doug Wilson	D	12	3	10	13	12	2	2	0	0
Tom Lysiak	C	15	4	8	12	10	5	0	0	0
Ed Olczyk	C	15	6	5	11	11	-4	1	1	0
Ken Yaremchuk	C	15	5	5	10	37	6	0	0	1
Curt Fraser	LW	15	6	3	9	36	-5	0	0	1
Behn Wilson	D	15	4	5	9	60	8	1	0	1
Bob Murray	D	15	3	6	9	20	-9	1	0	0
Keith Brown	D	11	2	7	9	31	13	1	0	0
Jack O'Callahan	D	15	3	5	8	25	-1	0	0	0
Rick Paterson	C	15	1	5	6	15	-5	0	0	0
Bill Gardner	C	12	1	3	4	2	-4	0	0	0
Marc Bergevin	D	6	0	3	3	2	-4	0	0	0
Steve Ludzik	C	15	1	1	2	16	-1	0	0	0
Murray Bannerman	G	15	0	2	2	4	0	0	0	0
Jerome Dupont	D	15	0	2	2	41	-7	0	0	0
Randy Boyd	D	3	0	1	1	7	0	0	0	0
Dan Frawley	RW	1	0	0	0	0	0	0	0	0
Warren Skorodenski	G	2	0	0	0	0	0	0	0	0

Goaltending

Player	MIN	GP	W	L	GA	GAA	SO
Murray Bannerman	906	15	9	6	72	4.77	0
Warren Skorodenski	33	2	0	0	6	10.91	0
Team:	939	15	9	6	78	4.98	0

Note: Pos = Position; GP = Games played; G = Goals; A = Assists; Pts = Points; +/- = plus/minus; PIM = Penalty minutes; PPG = Power-play goals; SHG = Short-handed goals; GWG = Game-winning goals
MIN = Minutes played; W = Wins; L = Losses; T = Ties; GA = Goals-against; GAA = Goals-against average; SO = Shutouts;

== Draft picks ==
Chicago's draft picks at the 1984 NHL entry draft held at the Montreal Forum in Montreal.

Round	#	Player	Nationality	College/Junior/Club team (League)
1	3	Eddie Olczyk	United States	US National Development Team (NAHL)
3	45	Trent Yawney	Canada	Saskatoon Blades (WHL)
4	66	Tommy Eriksson	Sweden	Modo Hockey (Sweden)
5	90	Timo Lehkonen	Finland	Jokerit (Finland)
5	101	Darin Sceviour	Canada	Lethbridge Broncos (WHL)
6	111	Chris Clifford	Canada	Kingston Canadians (OHL)
7	132	Mike Stapleton	Canada	Cornwall Royals (OHL)
8	153	Glenn Greenough	Canada	Sudbury Wolves (OHL)
9	174	Ralph DiFiore	Canada	Shawinigan Cataractes (QMJHL)
10	194	Joakim Pehrson	Sweden	Brynäs IF (Sweden)
11	215	Bill Brown	Canada	Simley High School (USHS-MN)
11	224	David Mackey	Canada	Victoria Cougars (WHL)
12	235	Dan Williams	United States	Oak Park High School (USHS-IL)
