= Valley Sports Complex =

Sports facility in Pennsylvania, United States

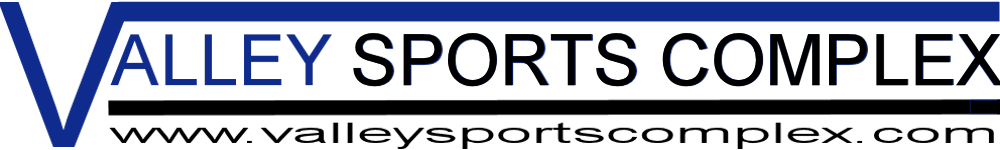
- Interactive map of Valley Sports Complex
- Location: New Kensington, Pennsylvania
- Coordinates: 40°34′39.7″N 79°44′16.6″W
- Owner: DR Rossetti & Associates (former); Pittsburgh Ice Arena LP

Construction
- Built: 2002
- Opened: 2003
- Renovated: 2012 (planned)

Valley Sports Complex is an ice hockey rink and sports facility in New Kensington, Pennsylvania.

Initial planning for the project began in 2002. It is the home ice of the Burrell High School, Fox Chapel Area High School, Knoch High School, and Plum High School hockey teams. The opening was delayed until 2003 because of legal and zoning issues.

In 2009, the facility went into receivership amid financial difficulties. In 2012, the facility was sold to a new ownership group, Pittsburgh Ice Arena LP, including partner Alain Lemieux former National Hockey League player and older brother of Mario Lemieux. Lemieux plans to use the facility as home for his Alain Lemieux Hockey Academy. The new owners planned a significant refurbishment project.
