= Larry Landon =

Canadian ice hockey player

- Born: May 4, 1958 (age 66); Niagara Falls, Ontario, Canada
- Height: 6 ft 0 in (183 cm)
- Weight: 190 lb (86 kg; 13 st 8 lb)
- Position: Left wing
- Shot: Left
- Played for: Montreal Canadiens; Toronto Maple Leafs
- NHL draft: 137th overall, 1978; Montreal Canadiens
- Playing career: 1981–1985

Larry James Landon (born May 4, 1958) is a Canadian retired professional ice hockey forward who played 9 games in the National Hockey League for the Montreal Canadiens and Toronto Maple Leafs between 1984 and 1985. Most of his career, which lasted from 1981 to 1985, was spent in the American Hockey League.

Landon was born in Niagara Falls, Ontario.

== Career statistics ==
=== Regular season and playoffs ===
			Regular season					Playoffs
Season	Team	League	GP	G	A	Pts	PIM	GP	G	A	Pts	PIM
1975–76	Niagara Falls Canucks	NDJBHL	48	56	56	112	—	—	—	—	—	—
1975–76	St. Catharines Black Hawks	OMJHL	16	1	1	2	2	—	—	—	—	—
1976–77	Niagara Falls Canucks	NDJBHL	32	20	28	48	—	—	—	—	—	—
1977–78	Rensselaer Polytechnic Institute	ECAC	29	13	22	35	14	—	—	—	—	—
1978–79	Rensselaer Polytechnic Institute	ECAC	28	18	27	45	28	—	—	—	—	—
1979–80	Rensselaer Polytechnic Institute	ECAC	25	13	17	30	8	—	—	—	—	—
1980–81	Rensselaer Polytechnic Institute	ECAC	29	20	27	47	18	—	—	—	—	—
1980–81	Nova Scotia Voyageurs	AHL	2	0	0	0	0	2	0	0	0	0
1981–82	Nova Scotia Voyageurs	AHL	69	11	15	26	31	8	1	0	1	6
1982–83	Nova Scotia Voyageurs	AHL	68	18	25	43	43	7	2	0	2	0
1983–84	Montreal Canadiens	NHL	2	0	0	0	0	—	—	—	—	—
1983–84	Nova Scotia Voyageurs	AHL	79	26	30	56	21	12	7	2	9	2
1984–85	Sherbrooke Canadiens	AHL	21	7	9	16	2	—	—	—	—	—
1984–85	Toronto Maple Leafs	NHL	7	0	0	0	2	—	—	—	—	—
1984–85	St. Catharines Saints	AHL	44	21	36	57	8	—	—	—	—	—
AHL totals			283	83	115	198	105	29	10	2	12	8
NHL totals			9	0	0	0	2	—	—	—	—	—
