= Bill Kitchen (ice hockey) =

Canadian ice hockey player

- Born: October 2, 1960; Schomberg, Ontario, Canada
- Died: July 30, 2012 (aged 51); Ottawa, Ontario, Canada
- Height: 6 ft 1 in (185 cm)
- Weight: 200 lb (91 kg; 14 st 4 lb)
- Position: Defence
- Shot: Left
- Played for: Montreal Canadiens; Toronto Maple Leafs
- NHL draft: Undrafted
- Playing career: 1980–1986

William Percy Kitchen (October 2, 1960 – July 30, 2012) was a Canadian professional ice hockey player. He played 41 games in the National Hockey League with the Montreal Canadiens and Toronto Maple Leafs between 1982 and 1985. He was born in Schomberg, Ontario and was the younger brother of Mike Kitchen.

== Playing career ==
Kitchen played four seasons in the Ontario Hockey League from 1976 to 1980 with the Windsor Spitfires and the Ottawa 67's. He also played for the Canadian national junior team at the 1980 World Junior Championships, where he registered 1 assist in five games.

After being undrafted, Kitchen signed with the Montreal Canadiens. He spent most of his time with the Nova Scotia Voyageurs of the AHL, playing only 12 NHL games from 1981 to 1984. In August 1984, Kitchen signed with the Toronto Maple Leafs as a free agent, unhappy with his minor league status with Montreal. He enjoyed his most successful season in 1984–85, playing 29 games and recording his only NHL goal. The next season, he was back in the minors with the St. Catharines Saints of the AHL. He retired from professional hockey following the 1985–86 season.

== Personal life and death ==
Kitchen was a successful Tim Horton's franchisee in Ottawa, Ontario. He was active in many local charities and a member of the NHL alumni. Kitchen had one son and three daughters.

Kitchen died in Ottawa, Ontario. He suffered a heart attack on July 30, 2012.

== Career statistics ==
=== Regular season and playoffs ===
			Regular season					Playoffs
Season	Team	League	GP	G	A	Pts	PIM	GP	G	A	Pts	PIM
1975–76	Toronto Nationals	MetJBHL	—	—	—	—	—	—	—	—	—	—
1976–77	Aurora Tigers	OPJAHL	44	3	24	27	87	—	—	—	—	—
1976–77	Windsor Spitfires	OMJHL	2	1	0	1	0	—	—	—	—	—
1977–78	Ottawa 67s	OMJHL	67	5	6	11	54	15	1	2	3	9
1978–79	Ottawa 67s	OMJHL	56	3	16	19	195	4	0	1	1	14
1979–80	Ottawa 67s	OMJHL	63	7	19	26	195	11	1	8	9	21
1979–80	Nova Scotia Voyageurs	AHL	—	—	—	—	—	2	0	1	1	0
1980–81	Nova Scotia Voyageurs	AHL	65	2	5	7	135	6	0	1	1	15
1981–82	Montreal Canadiens	NHL	1	0	0	0	7	3	0	1	1	0
1981–82	Nova Scotia Voyageurs	AHL	71	3	17	20	135	6	2	0	2	11
1982–83	Montreal Canadiens	NHL	8	0	0	0	4	—	—	—	—	—
1982–83	Nova Scotia Voyageurs	AHL	53	3	11	14	71	—	—	—	—	—
1983–84	Montreal Canadiens	NHL	3	0	0	0	2	—	—	—	—	—
1983–84	Nova Scotia Voyageurs	AHL	68	4	20	24	193	10	1	1	2	8
1984–85	Toronto Maple Leafs	NHL	29	1	4	5	27	—	—	—	—	—
1984–85	St. Catharines Saints	AHL	31	3	7	10	52	—	—	—	—	—
1985–86	St. Catharines Saints	AHL	72	7	32	39	109	12	0	2	2	19
AHL totals			360	22	94	116	695	36	3	5	8	53
NHL totals			41	1	4	5	40	3	0	1	1	0

=== International ===
Year	Team	Event	GP	G	A	Pts	PIM
1980	Canada	WJC	5	0	1	1	10
Junior totals			5	0	1	1	10
