= Alain Lemieux =

Canadian ice hockey player

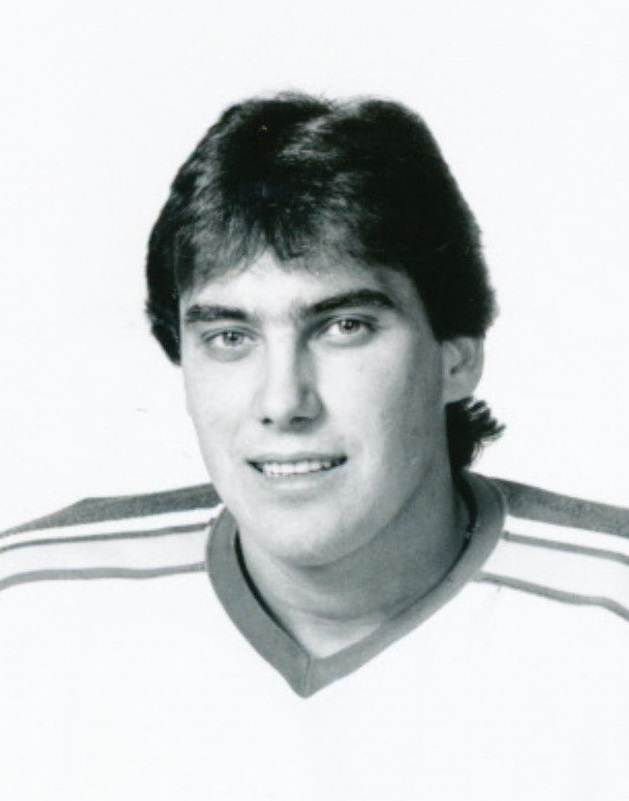
- Lemieux in 1982
- Born: May 24, 1961 (age 65) Montreal, Quebec, Canada
- Height: 6 ft 0 in (183 cm)
- Weight: 185 lb (84 kg; 13 st 3 lb)
- Position: Centre
- Shot: Left
- Played for: St. Louis Blues; Quebec Nordiques; Pittsburgh Penguins
- NHL draft: 96th overall, 1980; St. Louis Blues
- Playing career: 1981–1998

Alain Lemieux (born May 24, 1961) is a Canadian former professional ice hockey player. He played in the National Hockey League (NHL) with the St. Louis Blues, Quebec Nordiques, and Pittsburgh Penguins. He is also the older brother of NHL great Mario Lemieux.

== Career ==
As a youth, Lemieux played in the 1972 Quebec International Pee-Wee Hockey Tournament with a minor ice hockey team from Saint-Jean-de-Matha, Quebec, and in the same 1973 and 1974 tournaments with a team from Ville-Émard, Quebec.

In 1986 he played in Switzerland for EHC Olten. He also played most of the 1986–87 season with the Baltimore Skipjacks of the American Hockey League (AHL), then was promoted to the NHL's Pittsburgh Penguins for the rest of the season, where he played a single game, on February 17, 1987, against the Calgary Flames. He then returned to the Skipjacks for the first half of the 1987–88 season and then finished the season with the Hershey Bears. While in Baltimore, he recorded 88 games, 43 goals, 70 assists, 113 points, and 66 total penalty minutes. In 1994, Lemieux played 12 roller hockey games in Roller Hockey International with the Pittsburgh Phantoms, during the franchise's only season.

== Post-playing career ==
Lemieux was previously a member of the Pittsburgh Ice Arena LP group. In August 2012, the group purchased Valley Sports Complex, an ice rink located in New Kensington, Pennsylvania.

In April 2019, Lemieux was named the executive hockey director for the Admirals Hockey Club in Glen Ellyn, Illinois.

In 2021, Lemieux settled in Durango, Colorado and became director of the Durango Area Youth Hockey Association's Durango Ice Devils.

== Career statistics ==
| | | | Regular season | | | | | Playoffs |
| Season | Team | League | GP | G | A | Pts | PIM | GP | G | A | Pts | PIM |
|---|---|---|---|---|---|---|---|---|---|---|---|---|
| 1978–79 | Montreal Juniors | QMJHL | 39 | 7 | 5 | 12 | 2 | — | — | — | — | — |
| 1978–79 | Chicoutimi Saguenéens | QMJHL | 31 | 15 | 27 | 42 | 5 | 4 | 3 | 1 | 4 | 0 |
| 1979–80 | Chicoutimi Saguenéens | QMJHL | 72 | 47 | 95 | 142 | 36 | 12 | 8 | 12 | 20 | 8 |
| 1980–81 | Chicoutimi Saguenéens | QMJHL | 1 | 0 | 0 | 0 | 2 | — | — | — | — | — |
| 1980–81 | Trois-Rivières Draveurs | QMJHL | 69 | 68 | 98 | 166 | 62 | 19 | 18 | 31 | 49 | 38 |
| 1981–82 | St. Louis Blues | NHL | 3 | 0 | 1 | 1 | 0 | — | — | — | — | — |
| 1981–82 | Salt Lake Golden Eagles | CHL | 74 | 41 | 42 | 83 | 61 | 10 | 6 | 4 | 10 | 14 |
| 1982–83 | St. Louis Blues | NHL | 42 | 9 | 25 | 34 | 18 | 4 | 0 | 1 | 1 | 0 |
| 1982–83 | Salt Lake Golden Eagles | CHL | 29 | 20 | 24 | 44 | 35 | — | — | — | — | — |
| 1983–84 | Springfield Indians | AHL | 14 | 11 | 14 | 25 | 18 | 4 | 0 | 3 | 3 | 2 |
| 1983–84 | St. Louis Blues | NHL | 17 | 4 | 5 | 9 | 6 | — | — | — | — | — |
| 1983–84 | Montana Magic | CHL | 38 | 28 | 41 | 69 | 36 | — | — | — | — | — |
| 1984–85 | Peoria Rivermen | IHL | 2 | 1 | 0 | 1 | 0 | — | — | — | — | — |
| 1984–85 | St. Louis Blues | NHL | 19 | 4 | 2 | 6 | 0 | — | — | — | — | — |
| 1984–85 | Quebec Nordiques | NHL | 30 | 11 | 11 | 22 | 12 | 14 | 3 | 3 | 6 | 0 |
| 1985–86 | Quebec Nordiques | NHL | 7 | 0 | 0 | 0 | 2 | 1 | 1 | 2 | 3 | 0 |
| 1985–86 | Fredericton Express | AHL | 64 | 29 | 45 | 74 | 54 | 5 | 5 | 2 | 7 | 5 |
| 1986–87 | Baltimore Skipjacks | AHL | 72 | 41 | 56 | 97 | 62 | — | — | — | — | — |
| 1986–87 | Pittsburgh Penguins | NHL | 1 | 0 | 0 | 0 | 0 | — | — | — | — | — |
| 1987–88 | Springfield Indians | AHL | 15 | 7 | 10 | 17 | 4 | — | — | — | — | — |
| 1987–88 | Hershey Bears | AHL | 20 | 8 | 10 | 18 | 10 | — | — | — | — | — |
| 1987–88 | Baltimore Skipjacks | AHL | 16 | 2 | 14 | 16 | 4 | — | — | — | — | — |
| 1988–89 | Indianapolis Ice | IHL | 29 | 18 | 26 | 44 | 90 | — | — | — | — | — |
| 1988–89 | SaiPa | SM-l | 21 | 5 | 13 | 18 | 20 | — | — | — | — | — |
| 1990–91 | Albany Choppers | IHL | 33 | 5 | 36 | 41 | 24 | — | — | — | — | — |
| 1990–91 | Milwaukee Admirals | IHL | 30 | 8 | 21 | 29 | 30 | 6 | 2 | 5 | 7 | 12 |
| 1997–98 | Tucson Gila Monsters | WCHL | 8 | 5 | 11 | 16 | 24 | — | — | — | — | — |
| NHL totals | | | 119 | 28 | 44 | 72 | 38 | 19 | 4 | 6 | 10 | 0 |
| AHL totals | | | 201 | 98 | 149 | 247 | 152 | 9 | 5 | 5 | 10 | 7 |
