= Rick Vaive =

Canadian ice hockey player (born 1959)

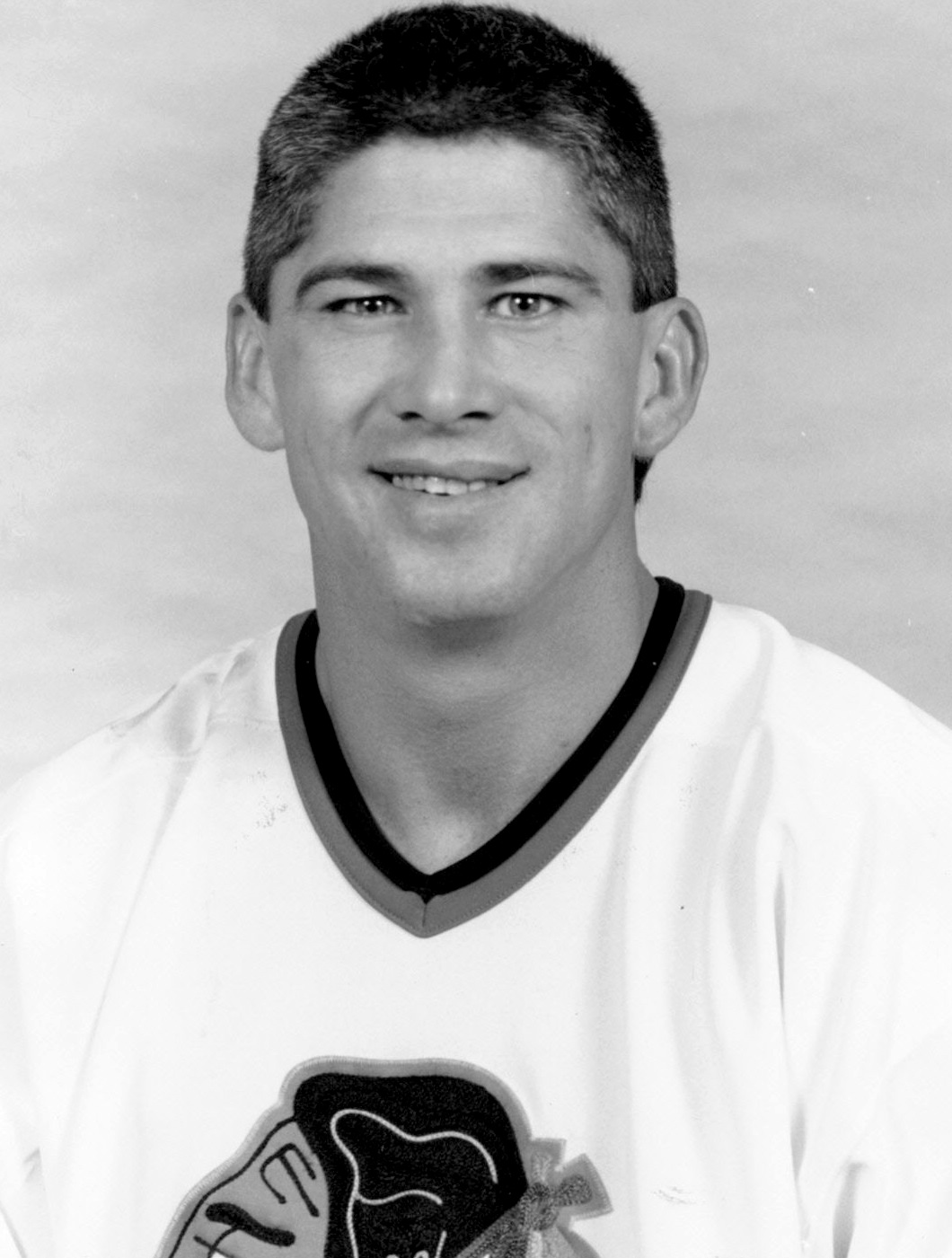
- Vaive with the Chicago Blackhawks in 1988
- Born: May 14, 1959 (age 67) Ottawa, Ontario, Canada
- Height: 6 ft 0 in (183 cm)
- Weight: 180 lb (82 kg; 12 st 12 lb)
- Position: Right Wing
- Shot: Right
- Played for: Birmingham Bulls; Vancouver Canucks; Toronto Maple Leafs; Chicago Blackhawks; Buffalo Sabres
- National team: Canada
- NHL draft: 5th overall, 1979; Vancouver Canucks
- Playing career: 1979–1992
Medal record
Representing Canada
World Championships
Bronze medal – third place	1982 Finland
Silver medal – second place	1985 Prague

Richard Claude Vaive (/ˈvaɪv/; born May 14, 1959) is a Canadian former professional ice hockey player. He played in the final season of the World Hockey Association (WHA) and played in the National Hockey League (NHL) from 1979 to 1992. While with the Toronto Maple Leafs, he became the first member of that team to score 50 goals in a season.

== Biography ==
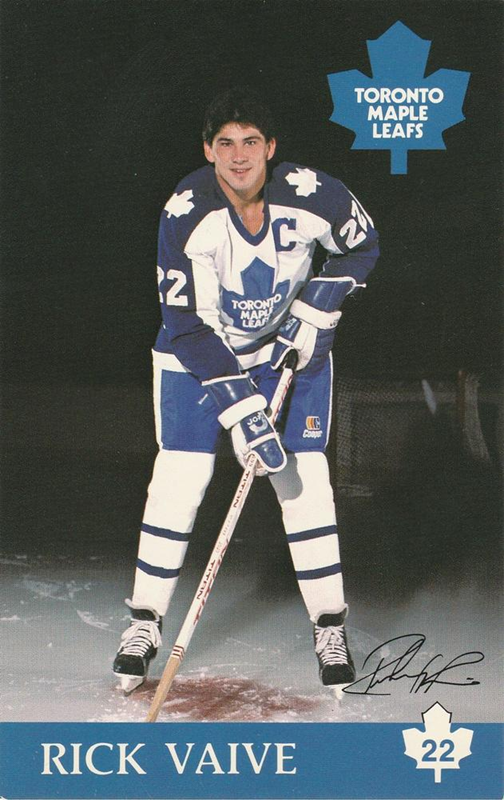
1982 postcard of Vaive as captain of the Toronto Maple Leafs

Vaive was born in Ottawa, Ontario to Claude (d. 2016) and Mary Vaive (d. 2010), and lived in Charlottetown, Prince Edward Island after he turned 11. Grandparents Lionel and Reina Vaive were from Gatineau, Quebec. As a youth, he played in the 1970 and 1971 Quebec International Pee-Wee Hockey Tournaments with a minor ice hockey team from Amherst, Nova Scotia.

After a stellar junior hockey career with the Sherbrooke Castors, he began his professional career in 1978-79 in the World Hockey Association (WHA) with the Birmingham Bulls, with whom he signed as an underage free agent. He was part of a contingent of young players who were nicknamed the "Baby Bulls", a group which also included Michel Goulet, Craig Hartsburg, Keith Crowder, Gaston Gingras and Pat Riggin. Following the NHL-WHA merger at the end of the season, these youngsters were declared eligible for the 1979 NHL entry draft, and Vaive was selected fifth overall by the Vancouver Canucks.

In 1980, the Canucks traded Vaive, along with Bill Derlago, to the Toronto Maple Leafs in exchange for Dave "Tiger" Williams and Jerry Butler. In Toronto, Vaive and Derlago were teamed with Pat Hickey, and Derlago became Vaive's setup man. Vaive was a prolific scorer for the Leafs, becoming the first player in the team's history to score 50 goals in a season. His 54 goals in 1981–82 stood as a franchise record for 40 years before it was broken by Auston Matthews in 2021–22. Vaive had each of his three 50-goal seasons come in seasons where the Leafs lost over 40 games each time. Vaive is the only skater with three 50-goal seasons come on teams that failed to win 30 games. Vaive served as captain of the Maple Leafs from 1982 to 1986; he was stripped of the captaincy during the 1985–86 NHL season, for missing a morning practice. Vaive was invited to the Canada Cup team in 1984, but was cut in training camp.

In 1987 Vaive was traded, along with Steve Thomas and Bob McGill, to the Chicago Blackhawks in exchange for Al Secord and Ed Olczyk, one of several lamentable deals by team owner Harold Ballard in the 1980s. Vaive netted 43 goals in his first season in Chicago but never managed more than 31 in a season after that.

Vaive was traded from the Chicago Blackhawks to the Buffalo Sabres on December 26, 1988, in exchange for center Adam Creighton. He spent four seasons with the Buffalo Sabres, then retired as a member of the American Hockey League's Hamilton Canucks in 1993.

He later played for the Dundee Real McCoys at the age of 42.

In May 2000, Vaive was inducted into the PEI Sports Hall of Fame.

== Coaching career ==
In 1993, immediately after his retirement as a player, Vaive became coach of the expansion South Carolina Stingrays of the East Coast Hockey League. He led the Stingrays to division titles in 1995 and 1997 and a conference championship in 1997, and in 1996–97 he became the first ECHL coach to win both the Brabham Cup and Kelly Cup in the same season. He then coached the Saint John Flames of the AHL for two seasons. Vaive coached the Mississauga Ice Dogs of the Ontario Hockey League in 2000-01, guiding the team to the worst record in the league and tying the 1995-96 London Knights for fewest wins in a season. He was fired and replaced by Don Cherry.

== Personal life ==
Vaive battled with anxiety for a majority of his playing career, which went undiagnosed for a number of years. Vaive also had a fear of flying that never wavered in his playing career. Vaive used drinking to both combat his fear of flying during road games and his anxiety, even after a doctor prescribed medication to treat the anxiety. Vaive first resolved to quit drinking alcohol after an embarrassing incident on his 35th birthday in 1994. He was sober for nearly 15 years before having a toast for his father-in-law's funeral in 2008.

On July 14, 2009, he was pulled over when driving home from a golf event in Vaughan, Ontario that saw him charged with impaired driving and driving with over 80 milligrams of alcohol in 100 millilitres of blood. He stated in court testimony that he broke his own limit of beers prior to taking the wheel but argued that he was not drunk and felt fine to do the three-hour trip home. At the time, it was noted in court that Vaive suffered from chronic joint pain, sleep apnea, and a bladder condition. Vaive entered rehab in December 2011.

On April 12, 2012, he was cleared of the charges, with the judge citing various factors ranging from delays in taking the test for blood alcohol, Vaive's testimony and video of him at the police station that showed him appearing lucid.

Vaive hosted various shows on Leafs TV, an MLSE-run property focusing on the Toronto Maple Leafs and also has been featured on podcasts and contributed articles to the Toronto Sun.

Vaive and his wife Joyce have two sons, Jeff and Justin, who was selected by the Anaheim Ducks in the 2007 NHL entry draft.

In 2020, Vaive's autobiography (co-written with Scott Morrison) Catch 22: My Battles, In Hockey and Life was published.

== Career statistics ==
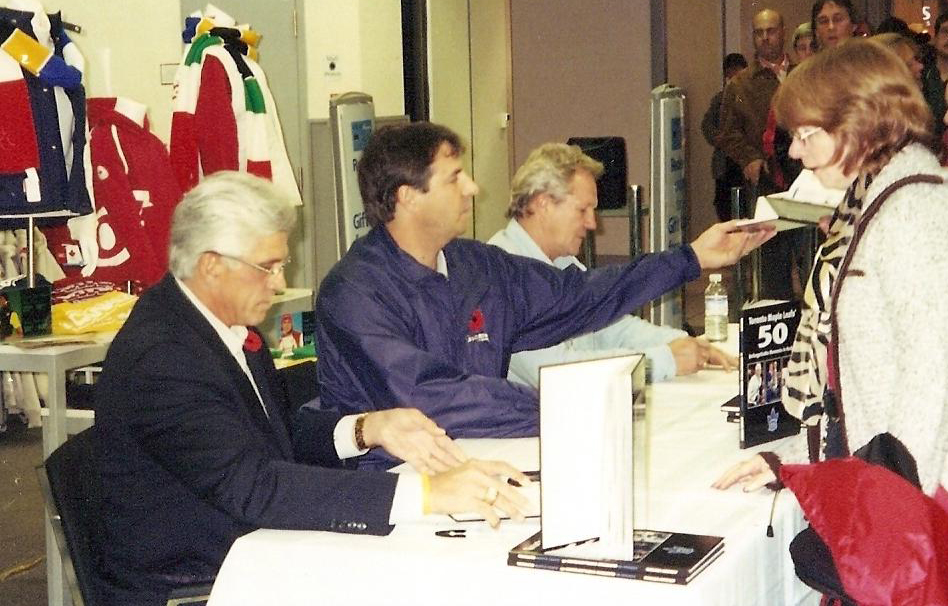
Vaive (left) signing books with Darryl Sittler (right) and author Mike Bynum (centre) at the Oshawa Centre in 2005

=== Regular season and playoffs ===
			Regular season					Playoffs
Season	Team	League	GP	G	A	Pts	PIM	GP	G	A	Pts	PIM
1975–76	Charlottetown Abbies	PEIJHL
1976–77	Sherbrooke Castors	QMJHL	68	51	59	110	93	18	10	13	23	78
1977–78	Sherbrooke Castors	QMJHL	68	76	79	155	199	9	8	4	12	38
1978–79	Birmingham Bulls	WHA	75	26	33	59	248	—	—	—	—	—
1979–80	Vancouver Canucks	NHL	47	13	8	21	111	—	—	—	—	—
1979–80	Toronto Maple Leafs	NHL	22	9	7	16	77	3	1	0	1	11
1980–81	Toronto Maple Leafs	NHL	75	33	29	62	229	3	1	0	1	4
1981–82	Toronto Maple Leafs	NHL	77	54	35	89	157	—	—	—	—	—
1982–83	Toronto Maple Leafs	NHL	78	51	28	79	105	4	2	5	7	6
1983–84	Toronto Maple Leafs	NHL	76	52	41	93	114	—	—	—	—	—
1984–85	Toronto Maple Leafs	NHL	72	35	33	68	112	—	—	—	—	—
1985–86	Toronto Maple Leafs	NHL	61	33	31	64	85	9	6	2	8	9
1986–87	Toronto Maple Leafs	NHL	73	32	34	66	61	13	4	2	6	23
1987–88	Chicago Blackhawks	NHL	76	43	26	69	108	5	6	2	8	38
1988–89	Chicago Blackhawks	NHL	30	12	13	25	60	—	—	—	—	—
1988–89	Buffalo Sabres	NHL	28	19	13	32	64	5	2	1	3	8
1989–90	Buffalo Sabres	NHL	70	29	19	48	74	6	4	2	6	6
1990–91	Buffalo Sabres	NHL	71	25	27	52	74	6	1	2	3	6
1991–92	Rochester Americans	AHL	12	4	9	13	4	16	4	4	8	10
1991–92	Buffalo Sabres	NHL	20	1	3	4	14	—	—	—	—	—
1992–93	Hamilton Canucks	AHL	38	16	15	31	34	—	—	—	—	—
2001–02	Dundas Real McCoys	ACH	5	2	2	4	24	—	—	—	—	—
2002–03	Dundas Real McCoys	ACH	9	6	5	11	34	4	2	3	5	6
WHA totals			75	26	33	59	248	—	—	—	—	—
NHL totals			876	441	347	788	1,445	54	27	16	43	111

=== International ===
Year	Team	Event	GP	G	A	Pts	PIM
1978	Canada	WJC	6	3	0	3	4
1982	Canada	WC	9	3	1	4	12
1985	Canada	WC	10	6	2	8	16
Senior totals			19	9	3	12	28

== Coaching statistics ==
Season	Team	League	G	W	L	T	OTL	PCT.	Playoff Result
1993-94	South Carolina Stingrays	ECHL	68	33	26	0	9	0.551	Lost in round 1
1994-95	South Carolina Stingrays	ECHL	68	42	19	0	7	0.669	Lost in round 2
1995-96	South Carolina Stingrays	ECHL	70	40	22	0	8	0.629	Lost in round 2
1996-97	South Carolina Stingrays	ECHL	70	45	15	10	0	0.714	Won Championship
1997-98	South Carolina Stingrays	ECHL	70	41	23	6	0	0.629	Lost in round 1
1998-99	Saint John Flames	AHL	80	31	40	8	1	0.444	Lost in round 2
1999-00	Saint John Flames	AHL	80	32	32	11	5	0.500	Lost in round 1
2000-01	Mississauga IceDogs	OHL	68	3	56	7	2	0.110
2004-05	Dundas Real McCoys	OHASr	34	20	12	0	2	0.618

Note: G = Games, W = Wins, L = Losses, T = Ties, OTL = Overtime Losses, PCT. = Winning Percentage

Preceded by Bill Derlago	Vancouver Canucks first-round draft pick 1979	Succeeded by Rick Lanz
Preceded by Darryl Sittler	Toronto Maple Leafs captain 1982–86	Succeeded by Rob Ramage
Preceded by First coach	South Carolina Stingrays head coach 1993–98	Succeeded by Rick Adduono
