= Peter Loob =

Swedish ice hockey player

- Born: 23 July 1957 (age 68) Visby, Sweden
- Height: 6 ft 3 in (191 cm)
- Weight: 190 lb (86 kg; 13 st 8 lb)
- Position: Defence
- Shot: Right
- Played for: Södertälje SK; Quebec Nordiques; Färjestad BK
- National team: Sweden
- NHL draft: 244th overall, 1984; Quebec Nordiques
- Playing career: 1978–1992

Peter Roland Loob (born 23 July 1957) is a Swedish former ice hockey defenceman. He played mostly in the Swedish Hockey League and played for the Swedish national team at the 1983 World Championships. In the 1984 NHL entry draft he was selected for Quebec Nordiques (as the 211th overall draft), where he played eight games, but played most of the 1984–85 season for the Fredericton Express in the American Hockey League and Muskegon Mohawks in the International Hockey League. The next year he returned to Sweden to play for Södertälje SK. He currently lives in Vadstena.

Loob is the older brother of Håkan Loob.

== Career statistics ==
=== Regular season and playoffs ===
			Regular season					Playoffs
Season	Team	League	GP	G	A	Pts	PIM	GP	G	A	Pts	PIM
1972–73	IK Graip	SWE-4	3	0	0	0	0	—	—	—	—	—
1973–74	IK Graip	SWE-4	14	16	—	—	—	—	—	—	—	—
1974–75	IK Graip	SWE-4	19	25	—	—	—	—	—	—	—	—
1975–76	IK Graip	SWE-3	—	—	—	—	—	—	—	—	—	—
1976–77	Karlskrona IK	SWE-2	33	11	5	16	—	—	—	—	—	—
1977–78	Karlskrona IK	SWE-2	15	3	5	8	26	—	—	—	—	—
1978–79	Karlskrona IK	SWE-2	25	12	14	26	36	—	—	—	—	—
1979–80	Karlskrona IK	SWE-2	27	19	9	28	60	—	—	—	—	—
1980–81	Färjestad BK	SWE	16	1	3	4	14	—	—	—	—	—
1981–82	Färjestad BK	SWE	31	8	8	16	24	2	0	0	0	0
1982–83	Färjestad BK	SWE	36	16	23	39	32	8	0	7	7	18
1983–84	Färjestad BK	SWE	36	12	15	27	36	3	0	2	2	4
1984–85	Quebec Nordiques	NHL	8	1	2	3	0	—	—	—	—	—
1984–85	Fredericton Express	AHL	35	4	10	14	12	—	—	—	—	—
1984–85	Muskegon Lumberjacks	IHL	10	0	4	4	0	—	—	—	—	—
1985–86	Södertälje SK	SWE	34	15	5	20	20	7	4	2	6	4
1986–87	Södertälje SK	SWE	33	6	11	17	22	—	—	—	—	—
1987–88	Nyköpings BIS	SWE-3	27	17	35	52	—	—	—	—	—	—
1988–89	IK Tälje	SWE-2	26	6	13	19	48	—	—	—	—	—
1989–90	Follingbo Flyers	SWE-4	—	—	—	—	—	—	—	—	—	—
1990–91	Follingbo Flyers	SWE-3	2	0	1	1	2	—	—	—	—	—
SWE totals			186	58	65	123	148	20	4	11	15	26
NHL totals			8	1	2	3	0	—	—	—	—	—

=== International ===
Year	Team	Event	GP	G	A	Pts	PIM
1983	Sweden	WC	3	1	2	3	8
Senior totals			3	1	2	3	8
