= Al Secord =

Canadian ice hockey player (born 1958)

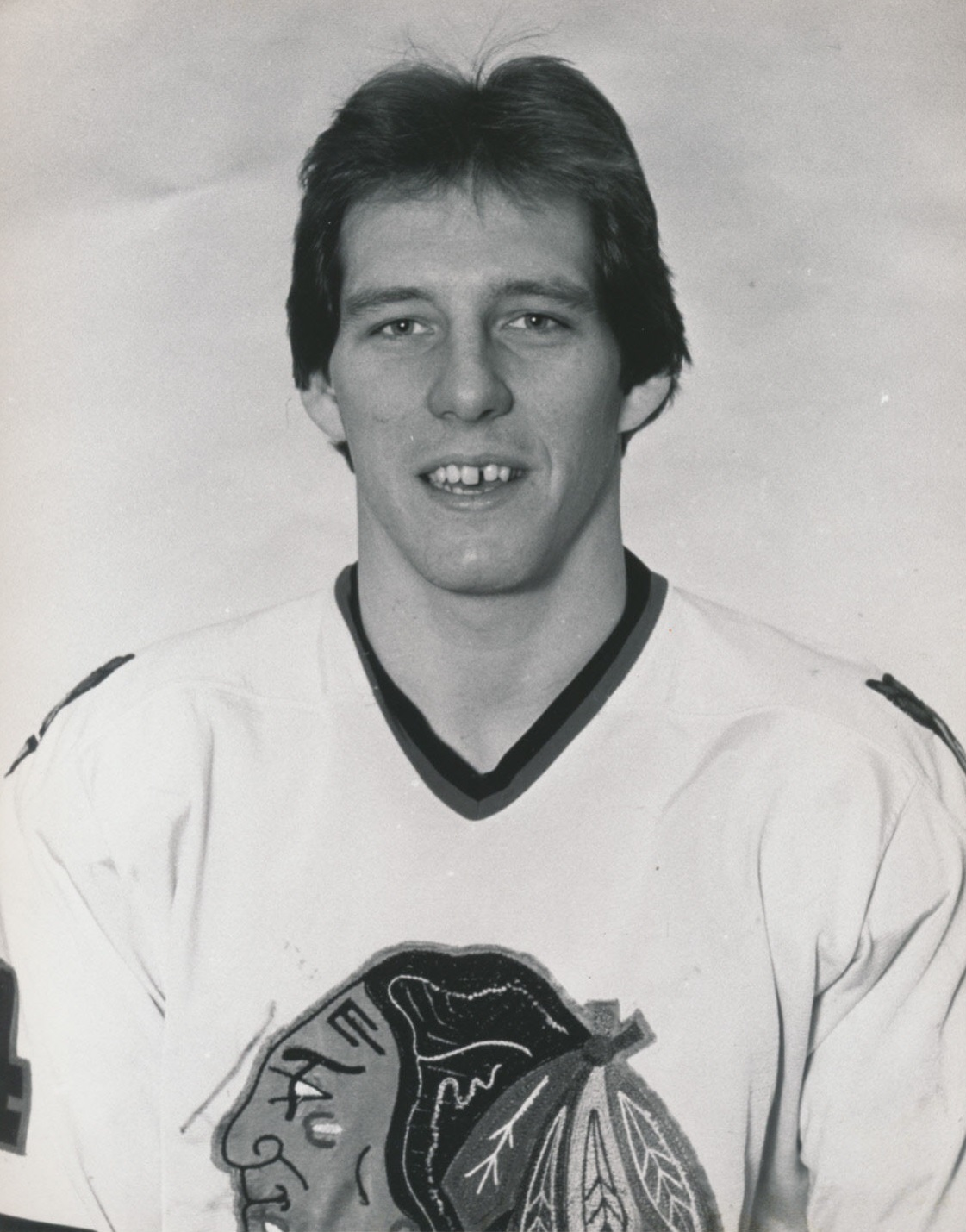
- Secord with the Chicago Black Hawks in 1980
- Born: March 3, 1958 (age 68) Sudbury, Ontario, Canada
- Height: 6 ft 1 in (185 cm)
- Weight: 205 lb (93 kg; 14 st 9 lb)
- Position: Left wing
- Shot: Left
- Played for: Boston Bruins; Chicago Black Hawks; Toronto Maple Leafs; Philadelphia Flyers
- National team: Canada
- NHL draft: 16th overall, 1978; Boston Bruins
- Playing career: 1978–1990; 1994–1996

Alan William Secord (born March 3, 1958) is a Canadian former professional ice hockey left wing who played in the National Hockey League for twelve seasons from 1978–79 until 1989–90. In 2023, he retired as a Captain for American Airlines, flying Boeing 737s.

== Playing career ==
Secord played on the 1976 Memorial Cup winning team, Hamilton Fincups of the OHA.

Secord was drafted 16th overall by the Boston Bruins in the 1978 NHL Amateur Draft. He made the Bruins' roster as a 20-year-old, scoring 16 goals and adding seven assists. He improved to 23 goals in 1979–80, but after failing to score in his first 18 games the following season, he was dealt to the Chicago Blackhawks on December 18, 1980, in a trade for defenceman Mike O'Connell.

In Chicago, Secord enjoyed the best years of his NHL career. In 1981–82, he scored 44 goals in 80 games. He was also assessed 303 minutes in penalties, making him the only player in NHL history to record 40 goals and 300 penalty minutes in a single season.

Secord joined the 50-goal club in 1982–83, posting 54 goals and 32 assists for a career-high 86 points and played in the NHL All-Star Game for the second consecutive season, but injuries began to take their toll. He played just 14 games in 1983–84, and it took him two full seasons to regain his scoring touch. Secord responded with a 40-goal campaign in 1985–86, but after a 29-goal season in 1986–87, Secord was dealt to the Toronto Maple Leafs on September 3, 1987. Secord and Ed Olczyk went to Toronto, while Rick Vaive, Steve Thomas and defenceman Bob McGill headed to Chicago.

Secord spent two seasons with the Maple Leafs and was sent to the Philadelphia Flyers midway through 1988–89 for a fifth-round draft pick in 1989 that the Buffalo Sabres eventually used to select defenceman Keith Carney.

Secord re-signed with Chicago as a free agent and finished his NHL career in 1990, scoring 14 times in 43 games. He retired from pro hockey until 1994, when he returned to play two seasons with the International Hockey League's (now American Hockey League) Chicago Wolves. He also played a season of roller hockey with the Chicago Cheetahs.

Secord played 766 career NHL games, scoring 273 goals and 222 assists for 495 points and registered 2,093 career penalty minutes.

== Personal life ==
Secord was an airline pilot with American Airlines and resides in Southlake, Texas, a suburb of Fort Worth. He has three sons, Ryan, Alec and Luke. He sometimes does work on behalf of the Chicago Blackhawks' Alumni Association. Secord also coaches youth hockey in the Dallas area with the Texas Jr. Brahmas organization.

== Career statistics ==
=== Regular season and playoffs ===
			Regular season					Playoffs
Season	Team	League	GP	G	A	Pts	PIM	GP	G	A	Pts	PIM
1974–75	Wexford Warriors	MetJHL	41	5	13	18	104	—	—	—	—	—
1975–76	Hamilton Fincups	OMJHL	63	9	13	22	117	12	0	2	2	24
1975–76	Hamilton Fincups	MC	—	—	—	—	—	3	0	0	0	5
1976–77	St. Catharines Fincups	OMJHL	57	32	34	66	343	14	4	3	7	46
1977–78	Hamilton Fincups	OMJHL	59	28	22	50	185	20	8	11	19	71
1978–79	Rochester Americans	AHL	4	4	2	6	40	—	—	—	—	—
1978–79	Boston Bruins	NHL	71	16	7	23	125	4	0	0	0	4
1979–80	Boston Bruins	NHL	77	23	16	39	170	10	0	3	3	65
1980–81	Springfield Indians	AHL	8	3	5	8	21	—	—	—	—	—
1980–81	Boston Bruins	NHL	18	0	3	3	42	—	—	—	—	—
1980–81	Chicago Black Hawks	NHL	41	13	9	22	145	3	4	0	4	14
1981–82	Chicago Black Hawks	NHL	80	44	31	75	303	15	2	5	7	61
1982–83	Chicago Black Hawks	NHL	80	54	32	86	180	12	4	7	11	66
1983–84	Chicago Black Hawks	NHL	14	4	4	8	77	5	3	4	7	28
1984–85	Chicago Black Hawks	NHL	51	15	11	26	193	15	7	9	16	42
1985–86	Chicago Black Hawks	NHL	80	40	36	76	201	2	0	2	2	26
1986–87	Chicago Blackhawks	NHL	77	29	29	58	196	4	0	0	0	21
1987–88	Toronto Maple Leafs	NHL	74	15	27	42	221	6	1	0	1	16
1988–89	Toronto Maple Leafs	NHL	40	5	10	15	71	—	—	—	—	—
1988–89	Philadelphia Flyers	NHL	20	1	0	1	38	14	0	4	4	31
1989–90	Chicago Blackhawks	NHL	43	14	7	21	131	12	0	0	0	8
1994–95	Chicago Wolves	IHL	59	13	20	33	195	3	1	1	2	19
1995–96	Chicago Wolves	IHL	47	8	8	16	108	9	1	0	1	4
NHL totals			766	273	222	495	2,093	102	21	34	55	382

=== International ===
Year	Team	Event	GP	G	A	Pts	PIM
1977	Canada	WJC	7	2	2	4	8
1987	Canada	WC	10	0	2	2	16

== Roller hockey statistics ==
                                           --- Regular Season --- 
Season   Team                        Lge    GP    G    A  Pts  PIM 
   1994  Chicago Cheetahs            RHI    18   11   14   25   45
------------------------------------------------------------------

== See also ==
- List of NHL players with 2000 career penalty minutes

Preceded by Dwight Foster	Boston Bruins first-round draft pick 1978	Succeeded by Ray Bourque
