= 1984–85 Montreal Canadiens season =

NHL hockey team season

1984–85 Montreal Canadiens
- Adams Division champions
- Division: 1st Adams
- Conference: 3rd Wales
- 1984–85 record: 41–27–12
- Home record: 24–10–6
- Road record: 17–17–6
- Goals for: 309
- Goals against: 262

Team information
- General manager: Serge Savard
- Coach: Jacques Lemaire
- Captain: Bob Gainey
- Alternate captains: None
- Arena: Montreal Forum

Team leaders
- Goals: Bobby Smith (40)
- Assists: Mats Naslund (42)
- Points: Mats Naslund (79)
- Penalty minutes: Chris Nilan (358)
- Plus/minus: Larry Robinson (+33)
- Wins: Steve Penney (26)
- Goals against average: Steve Penney (3.08)

The 1984–85 Montreal Canadiens season was the team's 76th season of play.

== Offseason ==
In July 1984, Patrick Roy signed his first NHL contract with the Montreal Canadiens. There was a clause that if he played in at least 40 games, he would receive a $5,000 bonus.

== Regular season ==
After scoring only two goals in 19 games and unhappy with the amount of ice time he was receiving, Guy Lafleur decided to retire.

On October 24, 1984, Patrick Roy was sent down to the Granby Bisons without having played a regular season game. On February 23, 1985, at the beginning of the third period, Patrick Roy made his NHL debut. Roy replaced Doug Soetaert and earned the first win of his career in a 6–4 win over the Winnipeg Jets. It was his only game this season but he would play 1,275 more games until 2003.

=== Final standings ===
Adams Division
	GP	W	L	T	GF	GA	Pts
**Montreal Canadiens**	80	41	27	12	309	262	94
**Quebec Nordiques**	80	41	30	9	323	275	91
**Buffalo Sabres**	80	38	28	14	290	237	90
**Boston Bruins**	80	36	34	10	303	287	82
Hartford Whalers	80	30	41	9	268	318	69

Note: GP = Games played, W = Wins, L = Losses, T = Ties, Pts = Points, GF = Goals for, GA = Goals against
Note: Teams that qualified for the playoffs are highlighted in bold.

=== Record vs. opponents ===
Adams Division record vs. opponents

==== Vs. Wales Conference ====
**Vs. Adams Division**

1984–85 NHL records
Team	**BOS**	**BUF**	**HFD**	**MTL**	**QUE**	**Total**
Boston	—	3–4–1	4–4	3–4–1	2–4–2	**12–16–4**
Buffalo	4–3–1	—	5–0–3	2–4–2	3–4–1	**14–11–7**
Hartford	4–4	0–5–3	—	2–5−1	3−5	**9–19–4**
Montreal	4–3–1	4–2–2	5–2−1	—	6–1–1	**19–8–5**
Quebec	4–2–2	4–3–1	5–3	1–6–1	—	**14–14–4**

**Vs. Patrick Division**

1984–85 NHL records
Team	**NJD**	**NYI**	**NYR**	**PHI**	**PIT**	**WSH**	**Total**
Boston	3−0	2−1	1−0–2	1−2	2−1	1−2	**10−6−2**
Buffalo	3−0	1−2	1−1−1	1−1–1	2−0–1	2−1	**10−5−3**
Hartford	3−0	1–1–1	1–0–2	0–2–1	2–1	2−1	**9−5−4**
Montreal	1−1–1	2−1	2–0–1	2−1	2−1	1−1–1	**10−5−3**
Quebec	1–1−1	3−0	2–1	1−1−1	3−0	1−2	**11−5−2**

==== Vs. Campbell Conference ====
**Vs. Norris Division**

1984–85 NHL records
Team	**CHI**	**DET**	**MIN**	**STL**	**TOR**	**Total**
Boston	0–3	3–0	3–0	1–0–2	2–1	**9–4–2**
Buffalo	3−0	1−1−1	3−0	1−2	2−1	**10−4−1**
Hartford	2–1	2−1	1−2	2–1	2–1	**9–6–0**
Montreal	1−2	1−1–1	1–2	2–0–1	0−3	**5–8–2**
Quebec	3–0	1–2	3–0	2–1	1–0–2	**10–3–2**

**Vs. Smythe Division**

1984–85 NHL records
Team	**CGY**	**EDM**	**LAK**	**VAN**	**WIN**	**Total**
Boston	0−3	1−2	1−0–2	2−1	1−2	**5−8−2**
Buffalo	3−0	0–2–1	0−2−1	0−2–1	1−2	**4−8−3**
Hartford	0−3	1–2	0–2–1	1–2	1–2	**3–11–1**
Montreal	0–2−1	2−1	2−0–1	1–2	2−1	**7−6−2**
Quebec	1−1–1	0−3	2−1	2−1	1−2	**6−8−1**

== Schedule and results ==
1984–85 regular season
October

Game	Result	Date	Score	Opponent	Record
1	L	October 11, 1984	3–4	@ Buffalo Sabres	0–1–0
2	W	October 13, 1984	4–3	Pittsburgh Penguins	1–1–0
3	W	October 15, 1984	5–2	Philadelphia Flyers	2–1–0
4	T	October 18, 1984	3–3 OT	Los Angeles Kings	2–1–1
5	W	October 20, 1984	4–2	Minnesota North Stars	3–1–1
6	W	October 23, 1984	3–1	@ Quebec Nordiques	4–1–1
7	W	October 25, 1984	3–2	Buffalo Sabres	5–1–1
8	L	October 27, 1984	5–6	@ Pittsburgh Penguins	5–2–1
9	W	October 29, 1984	4–2	Quebec Nordiques	6–2–1

November

Game	Result	Date	Score	Opponent	Record
10	W	November 1, 1984	6–5 OT	New York Islanders	7–2–1
11	W	November 3, 1984	3–1	Boston Bruins	8–2–1
12	L	November 6, 1984	2–4	@ Detroit Red Wings	8–3–1
13	T	November 10, 1984	3–3 OT	@ Calgary Flames	8–3–2
14	W	November 12, 1984	5–3	@ Vancouver Canucks	9–3–2
15	W	November 14, 1984	4–2	@ Edmonton Oilers	10–3–2
16	W	November 17, 1984	5–0	New Jersey Devils	11–3–2
17	L	November 19, 1984	4–6	Toronto Maple Leafs	11–4–2
18	W	November 22, 1984	3–2	Chicago Black Hawks	12–4–2
19	W	November 24, 1984	6–4	Detroit Red Wings	13–4–2
20	L	November 25, 1984	4–7	@ Boston Bruins	13–5–2
21	T	November 28, 1984	3–3 OT	@ Detroit Red Wings	13–5–3
22	T	November 30, 1984	2–2 OT	@ Buffalo Sabres	13–5–4

December

Game	Result	Date	Score	Opponent	Record
23	W	December 1, 1984	3–2	Buffalo Sabres	14–5–4
24	W	December 3, 1984	9–3	Hartford Whalers	15–5–4
25	L	December 5, 1984	3–5	@ Hartford Whalers	15–6–4
26	W	December 6, 1984	3–1	@ Boston Bruins	16–6–4
27	W	December 8, 1984	9–7	Los Angeles Kings	17–6–4
28	L	December 13, 1984	4–5	Vancouver Canucks	17–7–4
29	L	December 15, 1984	3–4 OT	@ Hartford Whalers	17–8–4
30	W	December 16, 1984	3–2	@ Philadelphia Flyers	18–8–4
31	L	December 18, 1984	4–6	Boston Bruins	18–9–4
32	T	December 20, 1984	2–2 OT	Washington Capitals	18–9–5
33	W	December 22, 1984	10–5	Hartford Whalers	19–9–5
34	T	December 23, 1984	3–3 OT	@ New York Rangers	19–9–6
35	W	December 27, 1984	5–3	@ Quebec Nordiques	20–9–6
36	W	December 29, 1984	7–3	New York Rangers	21–9–6
37	T	December 31, 1984	4–4 OT	Quebec Nordiques	21–9–7

January

Game	Result	Date	Score	Opponent	Record
38	L	January 2, 1985	2–3	@ Chicago Black Hawks	21–10–7
39	T	January 3, 1985	2–2 OT	@ St. Louis Blues	21–10–8
40	L	January 5, 1985	4–5	@ New Jersey Devils	21–11–8
41	L	January 8, 1985	1–3	@ New York Islanders	21–12–8
42	L	January 10, 1985	2–5	Edmonton Oilers	21–13–8
43	T	January 12, 1985	1–1 OT	Buffalo Sabres	21–13–9
44	W	January 15, 1985	2–1	@ Quebec Nordiques	22–13–9
45	W	January 17, 1985	5–4	Hartford Whalers	23–13–9
46	T	January 19, 1985	4–4 OT	New Jersey Devils	23–13–10
47	L	January 21, 1985	1–3	@ Boston Bruins	23–14–10
48	W	January 22, 1985	8–5	@ Hartford Whalers	24–14–10
49	L	January 24, 1985	3–4	Quebec Nordiques	24–15–10
50	W	January 26, 1985	3–2	New York Rangers	25–15–10
51	L	January 30, 1985	4–5 OT	@ Vancouver Canucks	25–16–10

February

Game	Result	Date	Score	Opponent	Record
52	W	February 2, 1985	5–1	@ Los Angeles Kings	26–16–10
53	L	February 5, 1985	2–4	Calgary Flames	26–17–10
54	W	February 7, 1985	5–4	@ Quebec Nordiques	27–17–10
55	L	February 9, 1985	2–6	Toronto Maple Leafs	27–18–10
56	L	February 10, 1985	2–3 OT	@ Toronto Maple Leafs	27–19–10
57	W	February 15, 1985	4–3 OT	@ Buffalo Sabres	28–19–10
58	L	February 16, 1985	3–4	Buffalo Sabres	28–20–10
59	W	February 19, 1985	5–2	@ St. Louis Blues	29–20–10
60	L	February 20, 1985	2–3	@ Chicago Black Hawks	29–21–10
61	W	February 23, 1985	6–4	Winnipeg Jets	30–21–10
62	W	February 24, 1985	4–3 OT	New York Islanders	31–21–10
63	W	February 27, 1985	4–1	@ Edmonton Oilers	32–21–10

March

Game	Result	Date	Score	Opponent	Record
64	L	March 1, 1985	4–6	@ Calgary Flames	32–22–10
65	L	March 4, 1985	3–4	@ Minnesota North Stars	32–23–10
66	W	March 6, 1985	4–2	@ Winnipeg Jets	33–23–10
67	W	March 9, 1985	4–3	Hartford Whalers	34–23–10
68	T	March 10, 1985	5–5 OT	@ Hartford Whalers	34–23–11
69	L	March 14, 1985	1–4	Winnipeg Jets	34–24–11
70	L	March 16, 1985	2–4	Minnesota North Stars	34–25–11
71	W	March 21, 1985	3–2	Washington Capitals	35–25–11
72	L	March 22, 1985	1–3	@ Washington Capitals	35–26–11
73	L	March 24, 1985	3–4	@ Philadelphia Flyers	35–27–11
74	W	March 26, 1985	5–3	Boston Bruins	36–27–11
75	W	March 28, 1985	5–1	St. Louis Blues	37–27–11
76	W	March 30, 1985	7–3	@ Boston Bruins	38–27–11
77	W	March 31, 1985	4–2	@ Pittsburgh Penguins	39–27–11

April

Game	Result	Date	Score	Opponent	Record
78	W	April 4, 1985	7–1	Quebec Nordiques	40–27–11
79	T	April 6, 1985	4–4 OT	Boston Bruins	40–27–12
80	W	April 7, 1985	5–4	@ Buffalo Sabres	41–27–12

Legend: Win (2 points) Loss (0 points) Tie (1 point)

== Playoffs ==
=== Adams Division Finals ===
The Quebec Nordiques and Montreal Canadiens battled in a seven-game series. Bitter rivals from the province of Quebec, the Nords shocked the Habs in 1982, only to see a fourth-place Montreal club upset Quebec the year before. In the deciding Game 7 at the Montreal Forum, Peter Stastny scored the game and series winning goal, giving Quebec an improbable 3–2 overtime win and berth in the Wales Conference Finals.

== Player statistics ==
=== Regular season ===
==== Scoring ====
Player	Pos	GP	G	A	Pts	PIM	+/-	PPG	SHG	GWG
Mats Naslund	LW	80	42	37	79	14	19	9	2	8
Mario Tremblay	RW	75	31	35	66	120	21	14	0	6
Chris Chelios	D	74	9	55	64	87	11	2	1	0
Guy Carbonneau	C	79	23	34	57	43	28	0	4	2
Pierre Mondou	C	67	18	39	57	21	15	2	0	2
Bobby Smith	C	65	16	40	56	59	-9	8	0	1
Larry Robinson	D	76	14	33	47	44	33	6	0	3
Tom Kurvers	D	75	10	35	45	30	-3	6	1	3
Mike McPhee	LW	70	17	22	39	120	1	0	0	2
Ryan Walter	C/LW	72	19	19	38	59	-18	11	0	0
Chris Nilan	RW	77	21	16	37	358	3	1	0	2
Mark Hunter	RW	72	21	12	33	123	-13	6	0	3
Bob Gainey	LW	79	19	13	32	40	13	0	3	3
Petr Svoboda	D	73	4	27	31	65	16	0	0	1
Alfie Turcotte	C	53	8	16	24	35	-1	3	0	1
Lucien DeBlois	C	51	12	11	23	20	9	4	1	2
Ron Flockhart	C	42	10	12	22	14	3	1	0	2
Craig Ludwig	D	72	5	14	19	90	5	1	0	0
Rick Green	D	77	1	18	19	30	-11	1	0	0
John Chabot	C	10	1	6	7	2	3	0	0	0
Guy Lafleur	RW	19	2	3	5	10	-3	0	0	0
Serge Boisvert	RW	14	2	2	4	0	-3	0	0	0
John Newberry	C	16	0	4	4	6	3	0	0	0
Steve Shutt	LW	10	2	0	2	9	2	1	0	0
Kent Carlson	D	18	1	1	2	33	1	0	0	0
Steve Rooney	LW	3	1	0	1	7	-1	1	0	0
Claude Lemieux	RW	1	0	1	1	7	1	0	0	0
Ric Nattress	D	5	0	1	1	2	-2	0	0	0
Steve Penney	G	54	0	1	1	10	0	0	0	0
Thomas Rundqvist	C	2	0	1	1	0	1	0	0	0
Jeff Teal	RW	6	0	1	1	0	0	0	0	0
Stephane Richer	RW	1	0	0	0	0	0	0	0	0
Patrick Roy	G	1	0	0	0	0	0	0	0	0
Doug Soetaert	G	28	0	0	0	4	0	0	0	0

==== Goaltending ====
Player	MIN	GP	W	L	T	GA	GAA	SO
Steve Penney	3252	54	26	18	8	167	3.08	1
Doug Soetaert	1606	28	14	9	4	91	3.40	0
Patrick Roy	20	1	1	0	0	0	0.00	0
Team:	4878	80	41	27	12	258	3.17	1

=== Playoffs ===
==== Scoring ====
Player	Pos	GP	G	A	Pts	PIM	PPG	SHG	GWG
Mats Naslund	LW	12	7	4	11	6	3	0	2
Bobby Smith	C	12	5	6	11	30	3	0	1
Larry Robinson	D	12	3	8	11	8	1	0	0
Chris Chelios	D	9	2	8	10	17	2	0	0
Ryan Walter	C/LW	12	2	7	9	13	0	0	0
Serge Boisvert	RW	12	3	5	8	2	1	0	0
Mario Tremblay	RW	12	2	6	8	30	1	0	0
Guy Carbonneau	C	12	4	3	7	8	0	1	1
Lucien DeBlois	C	8	2	4	6	4	1	0	0
Tom Kurvers	D	12	0	6	6	6	0	0	0
Mike McPhee	LW	12	4	1	5	32	0	0	0
Steve Rooney	LW	11	2	2	4	19	0	0	0
Bob Gainey	LW	12	1	3	4	13	0	0	0
Pierre Mondou	C	5	2	1	3	2	0	0	0
Chris Nilan	RW	12	2	1	3	81	1	0	1
Rick Green	D	12	0	3	3	14	0	0	0
Mark Hunter	RW	11	0	3	3	13	0	0	0
Ron Flockhart	C	2	1	1	2	2	0	0	1
Petr Svoboda	D	7	1	1	2	12	0	0	0
Craig Ludwig	D	12	0	2	2	6	0	0	0
Ric Nattress	D	2	0	0	0	2	0	0	0
Steve Penney	G	12	0	0	0	0	0	0	0
Doug Soetaert	G	1	0	0	0	0	0	0	0
Alfie Turcotte	C	5	0	0	0	0	0	0	0

==== Goaltending ====
Player	MIN	GP	W	L	GA	GAA	SO
Steve Penney	733	12	6	6	40	3.27	1
Doug Soetaert	20	1	0	0	1	3.00	0
Team:	753	12	6	6	41	3.27	1

Note:

Pos = Position;GP = Games played; G = Goals; A = Assists; Pts = Points; PIM = Penalty minutes; +/- = Plus/minus; PPG = Power-play goals; SHG = Short-handed goals; GWG = Game-winning goals
Pos = Position;GP = Games played; Min, TOI = Minutes played; W = Wins; L = Losses; T,T/OT = Ties; OTL = Overtime losses; GA = Goals-against; GAA = Goals-against average; SO = Shutouts; SA = Shots against; SV = Shots saved;SV% = Save percentage;

== Awards and records ==
- Chris Chelios, runner-up, Calder Memorial Trophy
- Chris Chelios, NHL All-Rookie Team
- Steve Penney, NHL All-Rookie Team

== Draft picks ==
=== NHL draft ===
Round	#	Player	Nationality	College/junior/club team
1	5	Petr Svoboda	Czechoslovakia	CHZ Litvínov (Czechoslovakia)
1	8	Shayne Corson	Canada	Brantford Alexanders (OHL)
2	29	Stephane Richer	Canada	Granby Bisons (QMJHL)
3	51	Patrick Roy	Canada	Granby Bisons (QMJHL)
3	54	Graeme Bonar	Canada	Sault Ste. Marie Greyhounds (OHL)
4	65	Lee Brodeur	United States	Grafton High School (North Dakota)
5	95	Gerald Johansson	Canada	Swift Current Broncos (SJHL)
6	116	Jim Nesich	United States	Verdun Juniors (QMJHL)
7	137	Scott MacTavish	Canada	Fredericton High School (New Brunswick)
8	158	Brad McCaughey	United States	Ann Arbor High School
9	179	Eric Demers	Canada	Shawinigan Cataractes
10	199	Ron Annear	Canada	United States International University (NCAA)
11	220	Dave Tanner	Canada	Notre Dame Hounds (SJHL)
12	240	Troy Crosby	Canada	Verdun Juniors (QMJHL)

== See also ==
- 1984–85 NHL season
