= 1984–85 Philadelphia Flyers season =

NHL hockey team season

1984–85 Philadelphia Flyers
- Wales Conference champions
- Patrick Division champions
- Division: 1st Patrick
- Conference: 1st Wales
- 1984–85 record: 53–20–7
- Home record: 32–4–4
- Road record: 21–16–3
- Goals for: 348 (4th)
- Goals against: 241 (3rd)

Team information
- General manager: Bob Clarke
- Coach: Mike Keenan
- Captain: Dave Poulin
- Alternate captains: None (Note: The alternate captain position was abolished from the 1975–76 season through the 1984–85 season.)
- Arena: Spectrum
- Average attendance: 16,951
- Minor league affiliates: Hershey Bears; Kalamazoo Wings

Team leaders
- Goals: Tim Kerr (54)
- Assists: Brian Propp (54)
- Points: Tim Kerr (98)
- Penalty minutes: Rick Tocchet (181)
- Plus/minus: Brad McCrimmon (+52)
- Wins: Pelle Lindbergh (40)
- Goals against average: Bob Froese (2.39)

The 1984–85 Philadelphia Flyers season was the franchise's 18th season in the National Hockey League (NHL). The Flyers reached the Stanley Cup Final but lost in five games to the Edmonton Oilers.

== Off-season ==
Bobby Clarke's first move as general manager was hiring Mike Keenan as head coach. Second-year player Dave Poulin was named team captain.

== Regular season ==
On October 18 they tied a franchise record for most goals in one game, after a 13–2 rout of the Vancouver Canucks at the Spectrum. They recorded another 10-plus goal contest on March 10 against Pittsburgh, crushing the Penguins 11–4. In addition, the team snapped the Edmonton Oilers' then NHL record 12–0–3 unbeaten streak to start the year with a 7–5 win on November 11. Four days later, they paid tribute to the recently retired Bobby Clarke on Bobby Clarke Night with a 6–1 win over the Hartford Whalers.

Although the club got off to a hot 16–4–4 start, they faltered in December, losing four straight games and five of six prior to Christmas. With the team's slate of games thin throughout January, the Washington Capitals surged to the top of the Patrick Division although the Flyers kept winning consistently.

After trailing the division-leading Capitals by 11 points in early February, the Flyers clinched the division title on March 28 and finished 12 points ahead of Washington, reeling off an incredible 24–4–0 record after February 9. The game that kicked off the stretch, on February 9 at the Capital Centre, saw Tim Kerr score four goals but Brian Propp won it, 5–4, with two seconds remaining in regulation. The club set a franchise record with 11 straight wins from March 5–24.

One season before the Presidents' Trophy was created to reward the NHL club with the most points, the Flyers finished the season with 113, four ahead of eventual Cup champion Edmonton. They also recorded their second-highest single-season goal total (tied with 1975–76, and two fewer than the previous season) and allowed the third-fewest goals behind Washington and Buffalo.

Twice during the season two players recorded hat tricks in the same game. Propp and Ilkka Sinisalo turned the trick in the Vancouver rout, while Poulin and Kerr teamed up for six goals in a wild 9–6 win over Washington on March 7.

Goaltender Pelle Lindbergh, who led the league with 40 wins, won the Vezina Trophy.

=== Season standings ===
Patrick Division
	GP	W	L	T	GF	GA	Pts
**Philadelphia Flyers**	80	53	20	7	348	241	113
**Washington Capitals**	80	46	25	9	322	240	101
**New York Islanders**	80	40	34	6	345	312	86
**New York Rangers**	80	26	44	10	295	345	62
New Jersey Devils	80	22	48	10	264	346	54
Pittsburgh Penguins	80	24	51	5	276	385	53

Note: GP = Games played, W = Wins, L = Losses, T = Ties, Pts = Points, GF = Goals for, GA = Goals against
Note: Teams that qualified for the playoffs are highlighted in bold.

=== Record vs. opponents ===
Patrick Division record vs. opponents

==== Vs. Wales Conference ====
**Vs. Patrick Division**

1984–85 NHL records
Team	**NJD**	**NYI**	**NYR**	**PHI**	**PIT**	**WSH**	**Total**
New Jersey	—	3−2−2	2−5	2−5	5−2	2−4−1	14−18−3
N.Y. Islanders	2−3−2	—	4−3	3−3−1	5−2	3−4	17−15−3
N.Y. Rangers	5−2	3−4	—	0−7	4−3	2−5	14−21−0
Philadelphia	5−2	3−3−1	7−0	—	5−2	5−1−1	25−8−2
Pittsburgh	2−5	2−5	3−4	2–5	—	0−6−1	9−25−1
Washington	4−2−1	4−3	5−2	1–5−1	6−0–1	—	20−13−2

**Vs. Adams Division**

1984–85 NHL records
Team	**BOS**	**BUF**	**HFD**	**MTL**	**QUE**	**Total**
New Jersey	0−3	0−3	0−3	1−1−1	1−1−1	2−11−2
N.Y. Islanders	1−2	2−1	1−1−1	1−2	0−3	5−9−1
N.Y. Rangers	0−1−2	1−1−1	0−1−2	0−2−1	1−2	2−7−6
Philadelphia	2−1	1−1−1	2−0−1	1−2	1−1−1	7−5−3
Pittsburgh	1−2	0−2−1	1−2	1−2	0−3	3−11−1
Washington	2−1	1−2	1−2	1−1−1	2−1	7−7−1

==== Vs. Campbell Conference ====
**Vs. Norris Division**

1984–85 NHL records
Team	**CHI**	**DET**	**MIN**	**STL**	**TOR**	**Total**
New Jersey	0−3	1−1−1	1−1−1	0−2−1	3−0	5−7−3
N.Y. Islanders	3−0	2−1	1−1−1	3−0	2−1	11−3−1
N.Y. Rangers	0−3	1−2	1−2	2−0−1	2−0−1	6−7−2
Philadelphia	2−1	2−0−1	3−0	3−0	2−1	12−2−1
Pittsburgh	1−2	1−1−1	1−2	1−2	2−1	6−8−1
Washington	3−0	2−1	2−0−1	2−0−1	2−0−1	11−1−3

**Vs. Smythe Division**

1984–85 NHL records
Team	**CGY**	**EDM**	**LAK**	**VAN**	**WIN**	**Total**
New Jersey	0−2−1	1−2	0−3	0−3	0−2−1	1−12−2
N.Y. Islanders	1−2	0−2−1	2−1	2−1	2−1	7−7−1
N.Y. Rangers	0−2−1	1−1−1	1−2	2−1	0−3	4−9−2
Philadelphia	2−1	3−0	1−1−1	3−0	0−3	9−5−1
Pittsburgh	2−0−1	1−1−1	0−3	2−1	1−2	6−7−2
Washington	2−1	0−1−2	2−1	3−0	1−2	8−5−2

== Playoffs ==
The Flyers rolled through the playoffs by sweeping the New York Rangers in three games, defeating the New York Islanders in five, and beating the Quebec Nordiques in six to return to the Stanley Cup Final. Though they defeated the defending champion Edmonton Oilers in game one by a score of 4–1 at home, Edmonton won the next four games and the series.

== Schedule and results ==
=== Regular season ===
1984–85 regular season
October: 6–2–2, 15 points (home: 3–0–1; road: 3–2–1)

Game	Date	Score	Opponent	Decision	Record	Points	Recap
1	October 11	2–2 OT	Washington Capitals	Lindbergh	0–0–1	1	T
2	October 13	4–2	@ Washington Capitals	Lindbergh	1–0–1	3	W
3	October 15	2–5	@ Montreal Canadiens	Lindbergh	1–1–1	3	L
4	October 18	13–2	Vancouver Canucks	Froese	2–1–1	5	W
5	October 20	1–3	@ Pittsburgh Penguins	Lindbergh	2–2–1	5	L
6	October 21	4–2	Pittsburgh Penguins	Froese	3–2–1	7	W
7	October 23	7–2	@ Minnesota North Stars	Lindbergh	4–2–1	9	W
8	October 25	7–2	St. Louis Blues	Froese	5–2–1	11	W
9	October 27	4–2	@ New Jersey Devils	Lindbergh	6–2–1	12	W
10	October 31	3–3 OT	@ Buffalo Sabres	Lindbergh	6–2–2	14	T

November: 8–2–2, 18 points (home: 6–2–1; road: 2–0–1)

Game	Date	Score	Opponent	Decision	Record	Points	Recap
11	November 1	4–7	Winnipeg Jets	Froese	6–3–2	14	L
12	November 3	5–1	Minnesota North Stars	Lindbergh	7–3–2	16	W
13	November 9	6–0	St. Louis Blues	Lindbergh	8–3–2	18	W
14	November 11	7–5	Edmonton Oilers	Lindbergh	9–3–2	20	W
15	November 15	6–1	Hartford Whalers	Lindbergh	10–3–2	22	W
16	November 17	5–3	@ Boston Bruins	Lindbergh	11–3–2	24	W
17	November 18	3–3 OT	New York Islanders	Lindbergh	11–3–3	25	T
18	November 21	4–3	Boston Bruins	Lindbergh	12–3–3	27	W
19	November 23	4–2	@ Buffalo Sabres	Lindbergh	13–3–3	29	W
20	November 24	4–4 OT	@ Hartford Whalers	Lindbergh	13–3–4	30	T
21	November 27	4–2	Chicago Black Hawks	Froese	14–3–4	32	W
22	November 29	1–2	New Jersey Devils	Lindbergh	14–4–4	32	L

December: 7–6–1, 15 points (home: 4–1–1; road: 3–5–0)

Game	Date	Score	Opponent	Decision	Record	Points	Recap
23	December 1	3–1	Pittsburgh Penguins	Froese	15–4–4	34	W
24	December 3	6–2	@ New York Rangers	Froese	16–4–4	36	W
25	December 6	1–1 OT	Quebec Nordiques	Lindbergh	16–4–5	37	T
26	December 8	4–2	New York Rangers	Froese	17–4–5	39	W
27	December 11	4–5 OT	@ Winnipeg Jets	Lindbergh	17–5–5	39	L
28	December 12	3–6	@ Toronto Maple Leafs	Lindbergh	17–6–5	39	L
29	December 15	2–6	@ New York Islanders	Lindbergh	17–7–5	39	L
30	December 16	2–3	Montreal Canadiens	Lindbergh	17–8–5	39	L
31	December 20	8–4	New Jersey Devils	Lindbergh	18–8–5	41	W
32	December 21	2–4	@ Pittsburgh Penguins	Lindbergh	18–9–5	41	L
33	December 23	7–4	Washington Capitals	Lindbergh	19–9–5	43	W
34	December 26	0–6	@ Washington Capitals	Lindbergh	19–10–5	43	L
35	December 28	7–4	@ Vancouver Canucks	Lindbergh	20–10–5	45	W
36	December 30	3–2	@ Los Angeles Kings	Lindbergh	21–10–5	47	W

January: 8–4–1, 17 points (home: 5–0–0; road: 3–4–1)

Game	Date	Score	Opponent	Decision	Record	Points	Recap
37	January 2	5–2	@ Edmonton Oilers	Lindbergh	22–10–5	49	W
38	January 3	3–4	@ Calgary Flames	Lindbergh	22–11–5	49	L
39	January 5	6–3	@ St. Louis Blues	Lindbergh	23–11–5	51	W
40	January 8	5–3	Vancouver Canucks	Lindbergh	24–11–5	53	W
41	January 10	6–1	Chicago Black Hawks	Lindbergh	25–11–5	55	W
42	January 12	3–5	@ New York Islanders	Lindbergh	25–12–5	55	L
43	January 13	7–1	Calgary Flames	Lindbergh	26–12–5	57	W
44	January 16	1–1 OT	@ Detroit Red Wings	Lindbergh	26–12–6	58	T
45	January 17	7–5	Detroit Red Wings	Lindbergh	27–12–6	60	W
46	January 19	4–1	@ Minnesota North Stars	Lindbergh	28–12–6	62	W
47	January 23	3–6	@ Los Angeles Kings	Lindbergh	28–13–6	62	L
48	January 27	2–6	@ Winnipeg Jets	Lindbergh	28–14–6	62	L
49	January 31	3–1	New Jersey Devils	Lindbergh	29–14–6	64	W

February: 8–3–1, 17 points (home: 6–1–1; road: 2–2–0)

Game	Date	Score	Opponent	Decision	Record	Points	Recap
50	February 2	3–6	Buffalo Sabres	Lindbergh	29–15–6	64	L
51	February 5	5–7	@ New York Islanders	Jensen	29–16–6	64	L
52	February 7	4–4 OT	Los Angeles Kings	Lindbergh	29–16–7	65	T
53	February 9	5–4	@ Washington Capitals	Lindbergh	30–16–7	67	W
54	February 10	3–2	New York Rangers	Lindbergh	31–16–7	69	W
55	February 14	6–3	Quebec Nordiques	Lindbergh	32–16–7	71	W
56	February 16	5–4	Edmonton Oilers	Lindbergh	33–16–7	73	W
57	February 18	8–2	Pittsburgh Penguins	Froese	34–16–7	75	W
58	February 21	4–1	Toronto Maple Leafs	Lindbergh	35–16–7	77	W
59	February 24	4–1	Calgary Flames	Lindbergh	36–16–7	79	W
60	February 26	3–2	@ Hartford Whalers	Froese	37–16–7	81	W
61	February 28	1–6	@ Boston Bruins	Lindbergh	37–17–7	81	L

March: 13–3–0, 26 points (home: 7–0–0; road: 6–3–0)

Game	Date	Score	Opponent	Decision	Record	Points	Recap
62	March 2	2–4	@ Quebec Nordiques	Froese	37–18–7	81	L
63	March 3	2–5	@ New Jersey Devils	Lindbergh	37–19–7	81	L
64	March 5	5–4 OT	@ New York Islanders	Froese	38–19–7	83	W
65	March 7	9–6	Washington Capitals	Froese	39–19–7	85	W
66	March 8	4–2	@ Washington Capitals	Lindbergh	40–19–7	87	W
67	March 10	11–4	Pittsburgh Penguins	Lindbergh	41–19–7	89	W
68	March 13	5–2	@ New York Rangers	Lindbergh	42–19–7	91	W
69	March 16	6–1	@ Toronto Maple Leafs	Lindbergh	43–19–7	93	W
70	March 17	5–3	New York Islanders	Lindbergh	44–19–7	95	W
71	March 19	5–3	@ Pittsburgh Penguins	Lindbergh	45–19–7	97	W
72	March 21	8–4	New York Rangers	Lindbergh	46–19–7	99	W
73	March 23	5–3	@ New Jersey Devils	Lindbergh	47–19–7	101	W
74	March 24	4–3	Montreal Canadiens	Lindbergh	48–19–7	103	W
75	March 27	2–5	@ Chicago Black Hawks	Lindbergh	48–20–7	103	L
76	March 28	3–1	Detroit Red Wings	Lindbergh	49–20–7	105	W
77	March 30	3–0	New York Rangers	Froese	50–20–7	107	W

April: 3–0–0, 6 points (home: 1–0–0; road: 2–0–0)

Game	Date	Score	Opponent	Decision	Record	Points	Recap
78	April 2	2–1	@ New York Rangers	Froese	51–20–7	109	W
79	April 4	3–0	New York Islanders	Lindbergh	52–20–7	111	W
80	April 7	6–1	@ New Jersey Devils	Lindbergh	53–20–7	113	W

Legend: W Win (2 points) L Loss (0 points) T Tie (1 point)

=== Playoffs ===
1985 Stanley Cup playoffs
Patrick Division semifinals vs. New York Rangers – Flyers win 3–0

Game	Date	Score	Opponent	Decision	Series	Recap
1	April 10	5–4 OT	New York Rangers	Lindbergh	Flyers lead 1–0	W
2	April 11	3–1	New York Rangers	Lindbergh	Flyers lead 2–0	W
3	April 13	6–5	@ New York Rangers	Lindbergh	Flyers win 3–0	W

Patrick Division finals vs. New York Islanders – Flyers win 4–1

Game	Date	Score	Opponent	Decision	Series	Recap
1	April 18	3–0	New York Islanders	Lindbergh	Flyers lead 1–0	W
2	April 21	5–2	New York Islanders	Lindbergh	Flyers lead 2–0	W
3	April 23	5–3	@ New York Islanders	Lindbergh	Flyers lead 3–0	W
4	April 25	2–6	@ New York Islanders	Lindbergh	Flyers lead 3–1	L
5	April 28	1–0	New York Islanders	Lindbergh	Flyers win 3–0	W

Wales Conference finals vs. Quebec Nordiques – Flyers win 4–2

Game	Date	Score	Opponent	Decision	Series	Recap
1	May 5	1–2 OT	@ Quebec Nordiques	Lindbergh	Nordiques lead 1–0	L
2	May 7	4–2	@ Quebec Nordiques	Lindbergh	Series tied 1–1	W
3	May 9	4–2	Quebec Nordiques	Lindbergh	Flyers lead 2–1	W
4	May 12	3–5	Quebec Nordiques	Lindbergh	Series tied 2–2	L
5	May 14	2–1	@ Quebec Nordiques	Lindbergh	Flyers lead 3–2	W
6	May 16	3–0	Quebec Nordiques	Lindbergh	Flyers win 4–2	W

Stanley Cup Final vs. Edmonton Oilers – Oilers win 4–1

Game	Date	Score	Opponent	Decision	Series	Recap
1	May 21	4–1	Edmonton Oilers	Lindbergh	Flyers lead 1–0	W
2	May 23	1–3	Edmonton Oilers	Lindbergh	Series tied 1–1	L
3	May 25	3–4	@ Edmonton Oilers	Lindbergh	Oilers lead 2–1	L
4	May 28	3–5	@ Edmonton Oilers	Lindbergh	Oilers lead 3–1	L
5	May 30	3–8	@ Edmonton Oilers	Froese	Oilers win 4–1	L

Legend: W Win L Loss

== Player statistics ==
=== Scoring ===
- Position abbreviations: C = Center; D = Defense; G = Goaltender; LW = Left wing; RW = Right wing
- † = Joined team via a transaction (e.g., trade, waivers, signing) during the season. Stats reflect time with the Flyers only.
- ‡ = Left team via a transaction (e.g., trade, waivers, release) during the season. Stats reflect time with the Flyers only.

No.	Player	Pos	Regular season						Playoffs					
No.	Player	Pos	GP	G	A	Pts	+/-	PIM	GP	G	A	Pts	+/-	PIM
12	Tim Kerr	RW	74	54	44	98	29	57	12	10	4	14	7	13
26	Brian Propp	LW	76	43	54	97	46	43	19	8	10	18	2	6
20	Dave Poulin	C	73	30	44	74	43	59	11	3	5	8	−1	6
23	Ilkka Sinisalo	RW	70	36	37	73	32	16	19	6	1	7	−1	0
32	Murray Craven	LW	80	26	35	61	45	30	19	4	6	10	6	11
25	Peter Zezel	C	65	15	46	61	22	26	19	1	8	9	−5	28
2	Mark Howe	D	73	18	39	57	51	31	19	3	8	11	11	6
14	Ron Sutter	C	73	16	29	45	13	94	19	4	8	12	−1	28
10	Brad McCrimmon	D	66	8	35	43	52	81	11	2	1	3	5	15
18	Lindsay Carson	C	77	20	19	39	0	123	17	0	3	3	0	24
24	Derrick Smith	LW	77	17	22	39	28	31	19	2	5	7	3	16
22	Rick Tocchet	RW	75	14	25	39	6	181	19	3	4	7	−1	72
27	Thomas Eriksson	D	72	10	29	39	24	36	9	0	0	0	−1	6
3	Doug Crossman	D	80	4	33	37	31	65	19	4	6	10	−3	38
11	Len Hachborn	C	40	5	17	22	16	23	4	0	3	3	0	0
8	Brad Marsh	D	77	2	18	20	42	91	19	0	6	6	1	65
9	Miroslav Dvorak	D	47	3	14	17	12	4	13	0	1	1	−1	4
19 (Note: Bergen wore number 42 during the regular season.)	Todd Bergen	C	14	11	5	16	9	4	17	4	9	13	7	8
15	Rich Sutter	LW	56	6	10	16	0	89	11	3	0	3	−2	10
21	Dave Brown	RW	57	3	6	9	−3	165	11	0	0	0	−1	59
6	Tim Young†	C	20	2	6	8	2	12	—	—	—	—	—	—
17	Ed Hospodar	D	50	3	4	7	7	130	18	1	1	2	4	69
29	Glen Cochrane‡	D	18	0	3	3	−4	100	—	—	—	—	—	—
36 (Note: Allison wore number 19 during the regular season.)	Ray Allison	RW	11	1	1	2	3	2	1	0	0	0	0	2
34	Ross Fitzpatrick	C	5	1	0	1	−3	0	—	—	—	—	—	—
35	Bob Froese	G	17	0	1	1		2	4	0	0	0		2
34	Paul Guay	RW	2	0	1	1	2	0	—	—	—	—	—	—
33	Darren Jensen	G	1	0	0	0		0	—	—	—	—	—	—
31	Pelle Lindbergh	G	65	0	0	0		4	18	0	1	1		0
28 (Note: Paterson wore number 6 in his first game.)	Joe Paterson	LW	6	0	0	0	−1	31	17	3	4	7	−2	70
5	Steve Smith	D	2	0	0	0	2	7	—	—	—	—	—	—
44	Mike Stothers	D	1	0	0	0	−1	0	—	—	—	—	—	—

=== Goaltending ===
No.	Player	Regular season											Playoffs									
No.	Player	GP	GS	W	L	T	SA	GA	GAA	SV%	SO	TOI	GP	GS	W	L	SA	GA	GAA	SV%	SO	TOI
31	Pelle Lindbergh	65	63	40	17	7	1926	194	3.02	.899	2	3,849	18	18	12	6	487	42	2.50	.914	3	1,007
35	Bob Froese	17	16	13	2	0	427	37	2.39	.913	1	927	4	1	0	1	73	11	4.51	.849	0	146
33	Darren Jensen	1	1	0	1	0	30	7	7.00	.767	0	60	—	—	—	—	—	—	—	—	—	—

== Awards and records ==
=== Awards ===
Type	Award/honor	Recipient	Ref
League (annual)	Jack Adams Award	Mike Keenan	
League (annual)	NHL first All-Star team	Pelle Lindbergh (Goaltender)	
League (annual)	Vezina Trophy	Pelle Lindbergh	
League (in-season)	NHL All-Star Game selection	Mark Howe (Note: Did not play)	
League (in-season)	NHL All-Star Game selection	Tim Kerr	
League (in-season)	NHL All-Star Game selection	Pelle Lindbergh	
League (in-season)	NHL Player of the Month	Pelle Lindbergh (March) (Note: Co-winner with Winnipeg Jets' Brian Hayward)	
League (in-season)	NHL Player of the Week	Pelle Lindbergh (November 19)	
League (in-season)	NHL Player of the Week	Ilkka Sinisalo (March 11) (Note: Co-winner with St. Louis Blues' Rick Wamsley)	
League (in-season)	NHL Player of the Week	Pelle Lindbergh (April 9) (Note: Co-winner with St. Louis Blues' Joe Mullen)	
Team	Barry Ashbee Trophy	Brad McCrimmon	
Team	Bobby Clarke Trophy	Pelle Lindbergh	
Team	Class Guy Award	Brad Marsh	

=== Records ===
Among the team records set during the 1984–85 regular season was tying the team record for most goals in a game (13) on October 18 against the Vancouver Canucks, a mark which was set only seven months earlier. On October 25, Tim Kerr scored the first of what would be three 4-goal games during the regular season (January 17 and February 9 being the others), tying the team record, and also set the team marks for most goals in a period (3) and the fastest three goals by one player (two minutes and twenty-seven seconds) during the game. On January 13, Brian Propp tied a team record when he scored two shorthanded goals while the three total during the game also tied a team record. Goaltender Pelle Lindbergh tied the team record for most consecutive wins (9) from March 9 to March 24. Propp's seven shorthanded goals on the season is tied for the team record and Kerr's five hat tricks on the season is a team record. The team set records for most wins (53, tied the following season) and fewest road ties (3, subsequently tied twice).

With their victory in game one of their division semifinal playoff series against the New York Rangers, the Flyers ended a franchise record six game playoff home losing streak that stretched from April 26, 1981, to April 7, 1984. In the series deciding 6–5 victory against the Rangers on April 13, Tim Kerr set a number of NHL and team records during the second period, scoring four goals (tied for the NHL record) in a span of an NHL playoff record eight minutes and sixteen seconds, an NHL record three of which were on the powerplay. His four points during the period and his three powerplay goals during the game is also tied for the NHL record, while the three minutes and twenty-four seconds it took him to score three goals is a team record. Peter Zezel's three assists during the period is tied for the team record (replicated by Kerr on April 21 against the New York Islanders) and four points during the game is tied for the team rookie record. Records tied by the team as a whole include most goals (5) and powerplay goals (3) during the period, while the four powerplay goals during the game is tied for the team record.

Lindbergh won a team record six consecutive playoff wins from April 10 through April 23, tying Bernie Parent's 1974 mark. Doug Crossman's three powerplay goals during the playoffs is tied for the team record among defensemen.

=== Milestones ===
Milestone	Player	Date	Ref
First game	Derrick Smith	October 11, 1984	
First game	Rick Tocchet	October 11, 1984	
First game	Peter Zezel	October 11, 1984	
First game	Mike Stothers	December 23, 1984	
First game	Todd Bergen	January 8, 1985	

== Transactions ==
The Flyers were involved in the following transactions from May 20, 1984, the day after the deciding game of the 1984 Stanley Cup Final, through May 30, 1985, the day of the deciding game of the 1985 Stanley Cup Final.

=== Trades ===
Date	Details		Ref
May 24, 1984	To Philadelphia Flyers: Ian Armstrong	To New Jersey Devils: 10th-round pick in 1985	
September 27, 1984	To Philadelphia Flyers: Future considerations	To New Jersey Devils: Sam St. Laurent	
October 10, 1984	To Philadelphia Flyers: Murray Craven; Joe Paterson	To Detroit Red Wings: Darryl Sittler	
March 12, 1985	To Philadelphia Flyers: 3rd-round pick in 1986 (Note: The Flyers initially received a 1985 3rd-round pick from Vancouver, but the deal was altered when Canucks' team doctors discovered Cochrane's right knee had not fully recovered from surgery the previous year.)	To Vancouver Canucks: Glen Cochrane	

=== Players acquired ===
Date	Player	Former team	Term	Via	Ref
July 25, 1984	Ed Hospodar	Hartford Whalers		Free agency	
September 30, 1984	Nick Kypreos	North Bay Centennials (OHL)		Free agency	
October 4, 1984	Don Nachbaur	Los Angeles Kings		Free agency	
October 8, 1984	Al Hill	Maine Mariners (AHL)		Free agency	
October 15, 1984	Tim Young	Winnipeg Jets	1-year	Free agency	
November 22, 1984	Craig Piette	University of Wisconsin–River Falls (NAIA)		Free agency	

=== Players lost ===
Date	Player	New team	Via	Ref
July 30, 1984	Frank Bathe		Retirement	
July 30, 1984	Randy Holt		Retirement	

=== Signings ===
Date	Player	Term	Ref
August 17, 1984	Doug Crossman		
August 17, 1984	Len Hachborn		
August 17, 1984	Brad McCrimmon		
September 22, 1984	Tim Kerr	multi-year	
February 17, 1985	Lindsay Carson		

== Draft picks ==
Philadelphia's picks at the 1984 NHL entry draft, which was held at the Montreal Forum in Montreal, on June 9, 1984. The Flyers selection of Petr Rucka in the eleventh-round, 226th overall, was voided since Rucka had already been selected by the Calgary Flames in the tenth-round.

Round	Pick	Player	Position	Nationality	Team (league)	Notes
2	22	Greg Smyth	Defense	Canada	London Knights (OHL)	(Note: The Flyers first-round pick, 16th overall, was traded to the Pittsburgh Penguins along with Andy Brickley, Ron Flockhart, Mark Taylor, and the Flyers' third-round pick for Rich Sutter and the Penguins' 1984 second and third-round picks on October 23, 1983.)
2	27	Scott Mellanby	Right wing	Canada	Henry Carr Secondary School (Toronto)	(Note: The Flyers traded Behn Wilson to the Chicago Black Hawks for Doug Crossman and the Black Hawks' second-round pick, 27th overall, on June 8, 1983.)
2	37	Jeff Chychrun	Defense	Canada	Kingston Canadians (OHL)	
3	43	Dave McLay	Forward	Canada	Kelowna Wings (WHL)	
3	47	John Stevens	Defense	Canada	Oshawa Generals (OHL)	(Note: The Flyers received the Hartford Whalers' third-round pick, 47th overall, as compensation for an earlier trade involving Fred Arthur, who retired before his contract expired.)
4	79	David Hanson	Center	United States	Grand Forks High School (N. Dakota)	
5	100	Brian Dobbin	Right wing	Canada	London Knights (OHL)	
6	121	John Dzikowski	Center	Canada	Brandon Wheat Kings (WHL)	
7	142	Tom Allen	Defense	Canada	Kitchener Rangers (OHL)	
8	163	Luke Vitale	Forward	Canada	Henry Carr Secondary School (Toronto)	
9	184	Billy Powers	Forward	United States	Matignon High School (Massachusetts)	
10	204	Daryn Fersovich	Forward	Canada	St. Albert Saints (AJHL)	
12	245	Juraj Bakos	Defense	Czechoslovakia	HC Košice (Czech)	

== Farm teams ==
The Flyers were affiliated with the Hershey Bears of the AHL and the Kalamazoo Wings of the IHL.
