= 1985 Stanley Cup Final =

1985 ice hockey championship series

	1	2	3	4	5	Total
Edmonton Oilers	1	3	4	5	8	4
Philadelphia Flyers	4	1	3	3	3	1
- Location(s): Edmonton: Northlands Coliseum (3, 4, 5); Philadelphia: Spectrum (1, 2)
- Coaches: Edmonton: Glen Sather; Philadelphia: Mike Keenan
- Captains: Edmonton: Wayne Gretzky; Philadelphia: Dave Poulin
- National anthems: Edmonton: Paul Lorieau; Philadelphia: Kate Smith
- Referees: Andy Van Hellemond (1); Kerry Fraser (2, 4); Bryan Lewis (3, 5)
- Dates: May 21–30, 1985
- MVP: Wayne Gretzky (Oilers)
- Series-winning goal: Paul Coffey (17:57, first)
- Hall of Famers: Oilers: Glenn Anderson (2008); Paul Coffey (2004); Grant Fuhr (2003); Wayne Gretzky (1999); Jari Kurri (2001); Kevin Lowe (2020); Mark Messier (2007); Flyers: Mark Howe (2011); Coaches: Glen Sather (1997); Officials: Andy Van Hellemond (1999)
- Networks: Canada: (English): CBC (1–2), CTV (3–5) (French): SRC; United States: (National): USA Network (Philadelphia area): PRISM (1–2), WTAF (3–5)
- Announcers: (CBC) Bob Cole, Gary Dornhoefer, and John Davidson (CTV) Dan Kelly, Ron Reusch, Tom Watt, and Brad Park (SRC) Rene Lecavalier and Gilles Tremblay (USA Network) Dan Kelly (1-2), Al Albert (3-5), and Gary Green (PRISM/WTAF) Gene Hart and Bobby Taylor

The 1985 Stanley Cup Final was the championship series of the National Hockey League's (NHL) 1984–85 season, and the culmination of the 1985 Stanley Cup playoffs. It was contested between the defending champion Edmonton Oilers (in their third straight Finals appearance) and the Philadelphia Flyers. The Oilers defeated the Flyers in five games to repeat as Stanley Cup champions. It was also the sixth straight Finals contested between teams that joined the NHL in 1967 or later.

Until 2022, this was also the last time that a team, defending champion, or runner-up appeared in the Finals for the third straight season. This was the fourth of nine consecutive Finals contested by a team from Western Canada, third of eight contested by a team from Alberta (the Oilers appeared in six, the Calgary Flames in 1986 and 1989, and the Vancouver Canucks in 1982), and the second of five consecutive Finals to end with the Cup presentation on Alberta ice (the Oilers won four of those times, the Montreal Canadiens once). Game five of this series was played on May 30, which at the time was the latest finishing date for an NHL season. The record was broken two years later.

== Paths to the Finals ==
Edmonton defeated the Los Angeles Kings 3–0, the Winnipeg Jets 4–0, and the Chicago Black Hawks 4–2 to advance to the finals.

Philadelphia defeated the New York Rangers 3–0, the New York Islanders 4–1, and the Quebec Nordiques 4–2 to make it to the finals.

== Game summaries ==
This was the first Stanley Cup Final in which games were scheduled for June. Game six was scheduled for June 2, and game seven for June 4. The NHL season would not extend into an actual June game until 1992, due to a players strike.

The NHL realigned its conferences and divisions based on geographic regions in 1981 and instituted a 2–3–2 schedule format for the Stanley Cup Final, with home ice advantage awarded to the division with the better aggregate record in interdivisional games. 1985 would be the last Final played under this format. Since then, the league has held to a 2–2–1–1–1 format, and home ice has gone to the team with the better regular season record.

Wayne Gretzky scored seven goals in the five games, tying the record set by Jean Béliveau of the Canadiens in 1956 and Mike Bossy of the Islanders in 1982. Grant Fuhr stopped two penalty shots. Jari Kurri scored 19 goals through the entire playoffs, tying the single-year record set by Reggie Leach of the Flyers in 1976.

This was the last Stanley Cup Final in which either starting goalie wore the old-style fiberglass mask. Both Fuhr and the Flyers' Pelle Lindbergh wore the face-hugging mask, which was introduced in 1959 by Jacques Plante. The backups, Edmonton's Andy Moog and Philadelphia's Bob Froese, wore the helmet-and-cage combination, similar to the one Billy Smith wore in leading the New York Islanders to four consecutive Cups from 1980 to 1983. The next year, the Calgary Flames' Mike Vernon sported a helmet-and-cage combo, and Montreal Canadiens rookie Patrick Roy wore a modern full fiberglass cage, the second goalie to sport that style in a Final series after Gilles Meloche with the Minnesota North Stars in 1981. Fuhr switched to a full fiberglass cage the next season.

This was the first Stanley Cup Final in which the NHL official (referee or linesman) wore a helmet (Andy Van Hellemond). This occurred during game one.

=== Game one ===
May 21	Edmonton Oilers	1–4	Philadelphia Flyers	Spectrum	Recap

The Flyers posted a 4–1 victory to open the series. Edmonton coach Glen Sather was reportedly so disappointed with his team's performance that he burned the game videotapes after watching them.

Scoring summary
Period	Team	Goal	Assist(s)	Time	Score
1st	PHI	Ilkka Sinisalo (6) – pp	Tim Kerr (4) and Todd Bergen (9)	15:05	1–0 PHI
2nd	None				
3rd	PHI	Ron Sutter (4)	Unassisted	05:56	2–0 PHI
3rd	PHI	Tim Kerr (9)	Dave Poulin (3)	08:07	3–0 PHI
3rd	EDM	Willy Lindstrom (3)	Mark Messier (10) and Randy Gregg (6)	16:52	3–1 PHI
3rd	PHI	Dave Poulin (3) – en	Lindsay Carson (2) and Ron Sutter (7)	19:39	4–1 PHI
Penalty summary
Period	Team	Player	Penalty	Time	PIM
1st	PHI	Dave Poulin	Elbowing	05:08	2:00
1st	EDM	Paul Coffey	Interference	05:49	2:00
1st	EDM	Kevin McClelland	Fighting – major	11:15	5:00
1st	PHI	Ed Hospodar	Fighting – major	11:15	5:00
1st	EDM	Willy Lindstrom	Cross-checking	13:59	2:00
1st	EDM	Charlie Huddy	Hooking	14:13	2:00
1st	EDM	Dave Lumley	Hooking	17:42	2:00
2nd	EDM	Kevin McClelland	Fighting – major	01:59	5:00
2nd	EDM	Don Jackson	Elbowing	01:59	2:00
2nd	EDM	Don Jackson	Fighting – major	01:59	5:00
2nd	PHI	Joe Paterson	Fighting – major	01:59	5:00
2nd	PHI	Ed Hospodar	Fighting – major	01:59	5:00
2nd	EDM	Glenn Anderson	Holding	06:23	2:00
2nd	PHI	Doug Crossman	Roughing	06:23	2:00
2nd	EDM	Randy Gregg	Holding	09:51	2:00
2nd	PHI	Brad Marsh	Holding	12:13	2:00
2nd	PHI	Ed Hospodar	High-sticking	16:30	2:00
3rd	EDM	Don Jackson	Roughing	04:29	2:00
3rd	PHI	Rick Tocchet	Slashing	04:29	2:00
3rd	EDM	Don Jackson	Hooking	13:47	2:00

Shots by period
Team	1	2	3	Total
Edmonton	8	4	14	26
Philadelphia	17	12	12	41

=== Game two ===
May 23	Edmonton Oilers	3–1	Philadelphia Flyers	Spectrum	Recap

Wayne Gretzky's first goal of the series late in the second period snapped a 1–1 tie, and Dave Hunter added an insurance empty-netter and the Oilers drew even in the series with a 3–1 win.

Scoring summary
Period	Team	Goal	Assist(s)	Time	Score
1st	EDM	Wayne Gretzky (11)	Paul Coffey (18)	10:29	1–0 EDM
2nd	PHI	Tim Kerr (10)	Dave Poulin (4) and Lindsay Carson (3)	10:22	1–1
2nd	EDM	Willy Lindstrom (4)	Mike Krushelnyski (8) and Kevin McClelland (3)	16:08	2–1 EDM
3rd	EDM	Dave Hunter (2) – en	Glenn Anderson (15)	19:33	3–1 EDM
Penalty summary
Period	Team	Player	Penalty	Time	PIM
1st	EDM	Paul Coffey	Tripping	04:17	2:00
1st	EDM	Lee Fogolin	High-sticking	06:03	2:00
1st	EDM	Dave Hunter	Roughing	09:22	2:00
1st	PHI	Brad Marsh	Roughing	09:22	2:00
1st	PHI	Tim Kerr	Holding	15:16	2:00
1st	EDM	Esa Tikkanen	Roughing	19:21	2:00
1st	PHI	Rick Tocchet	Cross-checking	19:21	2:00
2nd	EDM	Dave Hunter	Fighting – major	02:39	5:00
2nd	PHI	Tim Kerr	Fighting – major	02:39	5:00
2nd	PHI	Rick Tocchet	High-sticking	04:54	2:00
2nd	EDM	Mike Krushelnyski	Roughing	07:22	2:00
2nd	PHI	Ed Hospodar	Roughing	07:22	2:00
2nd	PHI	Brad Marsh	High-sticking	12:11	2:00
2nd	EDM	Glenn Anderson	Interference	13:35	2:00
2nd	EDM	Lee Fogolin	Cross-checking	17:58	2:00
2nd	PHI	Miroslav Dvorak	High-sticking	17:58	2:00
2nd	EDM	Charlie Huddy	Tripping	18:53	2:00
2nd	PHI	Tim Kerr	Cross-checking	19:51	2:00
3rd	None				

Shots by period
Team	1	2	3	Total
Edmonton	8	14	8	30
Philadelphia	6	8	4	18

=== Game three ===
May 25	Philadelphia Flyers	3–4	Edmonton Oilers	Northlands Coliseum	Recap

Gretzky almost single-handedly won Edmonton the game. He scored twice within the first 90 seconds of the game and finished off a hat trick by the end of the first period. Although the Oilers put only six shots on net over the final 40 minutes, it was enough to escape with a 4–3 win and 2–1 series lead.

Scoring summary
Period	Team	Goal	Assist(s)	Time	Score
1st	EDM	Wayne Gretzky (12)	Jari Kurri (4) and Paul Coffey (19)	01:10	1–0 EDM
1st	EDM	Wayne Gretzky (13)	Paul Coffey (20) and Charlie Huddy (13)	01:25	2–0 EDM
1st	PHI	Derrick Smith (2)	Doug Crossman (5) and Murray Craven (5)	01:41	2–1 EDM
1st	EDM	Wayne Gretzky (14)	Mark Messier (11) and Paul Coffey (21)	13:32	3–1 EDM
2nd	EDM	Mike Krushelnyski (4) – pp	Paul Coffey (22) and Wayne Gretzsky (27)	06:58	4–1 EDM
3rd	PHI	Mark Howe (3)	Rick Tocchet (3) and Brian Propp (10)	09:08	4–2 EDM
3rd	PHI	Brian Propp (7)	Murray Craven (6) and Rick Tocchet (4)	14:26	4–3 EDM
Penalty summary
Period	Team	Player	Penalty	Time	PIM
1st	PHI	Ron Sutter	Hooking	00:10	2:00
1st	EDM	Glenn Anderson	High-sticking	00:56	2:00
1st	EDM	Mike Krushelnyski	Roughing	03:32	2:00
1st	EDM	Don Jackson	Roughing	03:32	2:00
1st	PHI	Rick Tocchet	Roughing	03:32	2:00
1st	PHI	Ed Hospodar	Roughing	03:32	2:00
1st	PHI	Murray Craven	Interference	06:08	2:00
1st	EDM	Kevin McClelland	High-sticking	09:58	2:00
1st	PHI	Brad Marsh	High-sticking	09:58	2:00
1st	EDM	Glenn Anderson	High-sticking	11:08	2:00
1st	EDM	Glenn Anderson	Roughing	13:20	2:00
1st	PHI	Lindsay Carson	Roughing	13:20	2:00
1st	EDM	Don Jackson	Cross-checking	14:55	2:00
1st	PHI	Ed Hospodar	Roughing	17:19	2:00
1st	PHI	Ron Sutter	Elbowing	17:55	2:00
2nd	EDM	Dave Semenko	Misconduct	03:27	10:00
2nd	PHI	Ed Hospodar	Misconduct	03:27	10:00
2nd	PHI	Doug Crossman	Hooking	06:01	2:00
2nd	EDM	Dave Hunter	Holding	07:45	2:00
2nd	EDM	Lee Fogolin	Charging	12:02	2:00
2nd	EDM	Bench (served by Esa Tikkanen)	Too many men on the ice	19:19	2:00
2nd	PHI	Peter Zezel	Interference	19:53	2:00
3rd	EDM	Dave Semenko	Roughing – double minor	02:48	4:00
3rd	EDM	Charlie Huddy	Slashing	10:03	2:00
3rd	PHI	Rich Sutter	Cross-checking	10:03	2:00
3rd	PHI	Ron Sutter	Cross-checking	11:23	2:00
3rd	EDM	Dave Hunter	Misconduct	14:05	10:00
3rd	PHI	Joe Paterson	Misconduct	14:05	10:00

Shots by period
Team	1	2	3	Total
Philadelphia	12	9	9	30
Edmonton	20	4	2	26

=== Game four ===
May 28	Philadelphia Flyers	3–5	Edmonton Oilers	Northlands Coliseum	Recap

Unbowed, the Flyers leapt out to a 3–1 lead midway through the first period thanks to goals at even strength, on the power play and shorthanded. However, the Oilers roared back with four consecutive goals, including two from Gretzky, to win 5–3 and take a commanding series lead.

Scoring summary
Period	Team	Goal	Assist(s)	Time	Score
1st	PHI	Rich Sutter (1)	Ron Sutter (12) and Derrick Smith (2)	00:46	1–0 PHI
1st	EDM	Paul Coffey (10) – pp	Charlie Huddy (14) and Jari Kurri (8)	04:22	1–1
1st	PHI	Todd Bergen (4) – pp	Peter Zezel (8) and Doug Crossman (6)	06:38	2–1 PHI
1st	PHI	Murray Craven (4) – sh	Derrick Smith (3) and Brad Marsh (6)	11:32	3–1 PHI
1st	EDM	Charlie Huddy (3) – pp	Paul Coffey (23) and Jari Kurri (9)	18:23	3–2 PHI
2nd	EDM	Glenn Anderson (10)	Unassisted	00:21	3–3
2nd	EDM	Wayne Gretzky (15) – pp	Paul Coffey (24) and Charlie Huddy (15)	12:53	4–3 EDM
3rd	EDM	Wayne Gretzky (16) – pp	Mark Messier (12) and Glenn Anderson (16)	03:42	5–3 EDM
Penalty summary
Period	Team	Player	Penalty	Time	PIM
1st	PHI	Dave Poulin	High-sticking	03:31	2:00
1st	EDM	Pat Hughes	High-sticking	05:17	2:00
1st	EDM	Mark Messier	Slashing	05:59	2:00
1st	PHI	Doug Crossman	Holding	08:32	2:00
1st	PHI	Doug Crossman	Unsportsmanlike conduct	08:32	2:00
1st	EDM	Mark Messier	Hooking	08:47	Penalty shot
1st	PHI	Ed Hospodar	Slashing	16:32	2:00
2nd	EDM	Lee Fogolin	Roughing	00:48	2:00
2nd	PHI	Rick Tocchet	Roughing	00:48	2:00
2nd	PHI	Joe Paterson	Hooking	12:11	2:00
2nd	EDM	Dave Hunter	Roughing	17:39	2:00
2nd	PHI	Ray Allison	Slashing	17:39	2:00
2nd	EDM	Kevin Lowe	Holding	18:02	2:00
2nd	PHI	Doug Crossman	Holding	19:07	2:00
2nd	EDM	Dave Hunter	Holding	20:00	2:00
3rd	PHI	Ed Hospodar	Hooking	02:46	2:00
3rd	EDM	Dave Hunter	Kneeing	07:58	2:00

Shots by period
Team	1	2	3	Total
Philadelphia	10	6	7	23
Edmonton	10	12	10	32

=== Game five ===
May 30	Philadelphia Flyers	3–8	Edmonton Oilers	Northlands Coliseum	Recap

Against backup goaltender Bob Froese, substituting for starter Pelle Lindbergh (who had been playing progressively less well over the course of the Final), the Oilers blitzed the Flyers with a four-goal first period and sailed to a convincing 8–3 win. Gretzky and Kurri posted a goal and three assists each, while Paul Coffey and Mark Messier scored two goals apiece. Edmonton won its second consecutive Stanley Cup while the Flyers, at the time the youngest team in professional sports, took the lessons from their loss into the clubs' next Stanley Cup Final; they lost again to the Oilers in 1987, albeit in seven games. Wayne Gretzky won the Conn Smythe Trophy as playoff MVP, scoring a record 47 points this playoff year.

Scoring summary
Period	Team	Goal	Assist(s)	Time	Score
1st	EDM	Jari Kurri (19)	Wayne Gretzky (28) and Charlie Huddy (16)	04:54	1–0 EDM
1st	EDM	Willy Lindstrom (5)	Paul Coffey (20) and Charlie Huddy (13)	05:31	2–0 EDM
1st	PHI	Rich Sutter (2)	Derrick Smith (4)	07:23	2–1 EDM
1st	EDM	Paul Coffey (11)	Wayne Gretzky (29)	15:31	3–1 EDM
1st	EDM	Paul Coffey (12) – pp	Charlie Huddy (17) and Jari Kurri (10)	13:32	4–1 EDM
2nd	EDM	Mark Messier (11)	Unassisted	09:18	5–1 EDM
2nd	EDM	Mike Krushelnyski (5)	Wayne Gretzky (30) and Jari Kurri (11)	10:20	6–1 EDM
2nd	EDM	Wayne Gretzky (17)	Jari Kurri (12) and Paul Coffey (25)	16:49	7–1 EDM
3rd	PHI	Brian Propp (8) – pp	Mark Howe (8) and Dave Poulin (5)	09:18	7–2 EDM
3rd	EDM	Mark Messier (12)	Unassisted	03:39	8–2 EDM
3rd	PHI	Rich Sutter (3)	Derrick Smith (5)	07:05	8–3 EDM
Penalty summary
Period	Team	Player	Penalty	Time	PIM
1st	EDM	Don Jackson	Slashing	01:03	2:00
1st	PHI	Dave Brown	Slashing	01:03	2:00
1st	PHI	Ed Hospodar	Holding	08:45	2:00
1st	EDM	Don Jackson	Roughing	15:40	2:00
1st	PHI	Doug Crossman	Hooking	16:47	2:00
2nd	PHI	Rick Tocchet	Slashing	03:43	2:00
2nd	PHI	Rick Tocchet	Holding	06:44	2:00
2nd	EDM	Mark Messier	Hooking	07:05	2:00
2nd	EDM	Kevin McClelland	Roughing	12:23	2:00
2nd	PHI	Rich Sutter	Cross-checking	12:23	2:00
2nd	EDM	Glenn Anderson	Roughing	15:36	2:00
2nd	PHI	Joe Paterson	Roughing	15:36	2:00
2nd	EDM	Kevin McClelland	Roughing	19:55	2:00
2nd	PHI	Dave Brown	Roughing	19:55	2:00
3rd	EDM	Mark Messier	Hooking	00:38	2:00
3rd	EDM	Paul Coffey	Roughing	01:55	2:00
3rd	PHI	Peter Zezel	Roughing	01:55	2:00
3rd	EDM	Don Jackson	Tripping	03:57	2:00
3rd	EDM	Kevin Lowe	High-sticking	08:23	2:00
3rd	PHI	Murray Craven	Hooking	12:28	2:00
3rd	PHI	Bob Froese	Slashing	12:38	2:00
3rd	EDM	Mark Messier	Hooking	12:51	Penalty shot
3rd	EDM	Kevin McClelland	Fighting – major	15:22	5:00
3rd	EDM	Kevin McClelland	Misconduct	15:22	10:00
3rd	EDM	Kevin McClelland	Game misconduct	15:22	10:00
3rd	EDM	Don Jackson	Roughing	15:22	2:00
3rd	EDM	Don Jackson	Unsportsmanlike conduct	15:22	2:00
3rd	EDM	Don Jackson	Misconduct	15:22	10:00
3rd	PHI	Dave Brown	Fighting – major	15:22	5:00
3rd	PHI	Dave Brown	Misconduct	15:22	10:00
3rd	PHI	Brad Marsh	Fighting – major	15:22	5:00
3rd	PHI	Brad Marsh	Misconduct	15:22	10:00
3rd	EDM	Brad Marsh	Game misconduct	15:22	10:00

Shots by period
Team	1	2	3	Total
Philadelphia	7	8	7	22
Edmonton	12	17	12	41

== Broadcasting ==
In Canada, this was the first of two consecutive years that the English-language rights of the Cup Final were shared between CBC and CTV. CBC televised games one and two nationally while games 3–5 were televised in Edmonton only. CTV televised games 3–5 nationally while games were blacked out in Edmonton. Had the series gone to a game seven, then both CBC and CTV would have simultaneously televised it while using their own production facilities and crews. Dan Kelly, Ron Reusch, and Brad Park called the games on CTV.

In the United States, this was the fifth and final season that the Cup Final aired nationally on the USA Network. Under the U.S. TV contracts that would take effect beginning next season, ESPN would take over as the NHL's American television partner. The USA Network would not air NHL games again until 2015 when it became an occasional overflow channel for NBC Sports' national coverage of the first two rounds of the Stanley Cup playoffs.

The USA Network's national coverage of the 1985 Cup Final was blacked out in the Philadelphia area due to the local rights to Flyers games in that TV market. PRISM aired games one and two while WTXF aired games three, four, and five.

== Team rosters ==
=== Edmonton Oilers ===
#	Nat	Player	Position	Hand	Age	Acquired	Place of birth	Finals appearance
9	(Canada)	Glenn Anderson	RW	L	24	1979	Vancouver, British Columbia	third (1983, 1984)
20	(Canada)	Billy Carroll	C	L	26	1984–85	Toronto, Ontario	fifth (1981, 1982, 1983, 1984)
7	(Canada)	Paul Coffey	D	L	23	1980	Weston, Ontario	third (1983, 1984)
2	(United States)	Lee Fogolin	D	R	30	1979–80	Chicago, Illinois	third (1983, 1984)
31	(Canada)	Grant Fuhr	G	R	22	1981	Spruce Grove, Alberta	third (1983, 1984)
21	(Canada)	Randy Gregg	D	L	29	1981–82	Edmonton, Alberta	third (1983, 1984)
99	(Canada)	Wayne Gretzky – C	C	L	24	1979–80	Brantford, Ontario	third (1983, 1984)
22	(Canada)	Charlie Huddy	D	L	25	1980–81	Oshawa, Ontario	third (1983, 1984)
16	(Canada)	Pat Hughes	RW	R	30	1980–81	Calgary, Alberta	fourth (1979, 1983, 1984)
12	(Canada)	Dave Hunter	LW	L	27	1979–80	Petrolia, Ontario	third (1983, 1984)
29	(United States)	Don Jackson	D	L	28	1981–82	Minneapolis, Minnesota	third (1983, 1984)
26	(Canada)	Mike Krushelnyski	C	L	25	1984–85	Montreal, Quebec	first
17	(Finland)	Jari Kurri	RW	R	25	1980	Helsinki, Finland	third (1983, 1984)
19	(Sweden)	Willy Lindstrom	RW	L	34	1982–83	Grums, Sweden	third (1983, 1984)
4	(Canada)	Kevin Lowe	D	L	26	1979	Lachute, Quebec	third (1983, 1984)
8	(Canada)	Dave Lumley	RW	R	30	1979–80	Toronto, Ontario	third (1983, 1984)
24	(Canada)	Kevin McClelland	C	R	22	1983–84	Oshawa, Ontario	second (1984)
28	(Canada)	Larry Melnyk	D	L	25	1983–84	Saskatoon, Saskatchewan	second (1984)
11	(Canada)	Mark Messier	C	L	24	1979	Edmonton, Alberta	third (1983, 1984)
35	(Canada)	Andy Moog	G	L	25	1980	Penticton, British Columbia	third (1983, 1984)
18	(Canada)	Mark Napier	RW	L	28	1984–85	North York, Ontario	second (1979)
10	(Czechoslovakia)	Jaroslav Pouzar	LW	L	33	1982	Cakov, Czechoslovakia	third (1983, 1984)
27	(Canada)	Dave Semenko	LW	L	27	1979–80	Winnipeg, Manitoba	third (1983, 1984)
14	(Finland)	Esa Tikkanen	LW	L	20	1983	Helsinki, Finland	first

=== Philadelphia Flyers ===
#	Nat	Player	Position	Hand	Age	Acquired	Place of birth	Finals appearance
19	(Canada)	Ray Allison	RW	R	26	1981–82	Cranbrook, British Columbia	first
42	(Canada)	Todd Bergen	C	L	21	1982	Prince Albert, Saskatchewan	first
21	(Canada)	Dave Brown	RW	R	22	1982	Saskatoon, Saskatchewan	first
18	(Canada)	Lindsay Carson	LW	L	24	1979	Oxbow, Saskatchewan	first
32	(Canada)	Murray Craven	LW	L	20	1984–85	Medicine Hat, Alberta	first
3	(Canada)	Doug Crossman	D	L	24	1983–84	Peterborough, Ontario	first
9	(Czechoslovakia)	Miroslav Dvorak	D	L	33	1982	Hluboká nad Vltavou, Czechosloavkia	first
27	(Sweden)	Thomas Eriksson	D	L	25	1979	Stockholm, Sweden	first
35	(Canada)	Bob Froese	G	L	26	1981–82	St. Catharines, Ontario	first
11	(Canada)	Len Hachborn	C	L	23	1981	Brantford, Ontario	first
17	(United States)	Ed Hospodar	D	L	26	1984–85	Bowling Green, Ohio	first
2	(United States)	Mark Howe	D	L	30	1982–83	Detroit, Michigan	first
12	(Canada)	Tim Kerr	RW	R	25	1980–81	Windsor, Ontario	first
27	(Sweden)	Pelle Lindbergh	G	L	26	1979	Stockholm, Sweden	first
8	(Canada)	Brad Marsh	D	L	27	1981–82	London, Ontario	first
10	(Canada)	Brad McCrimmon	D	L	26	1982–83	Dodsland, Saskatchewan	first (did not play)
28	(Canada)	Joe Paterson	LW	L	24	1984–85	Toronto, Ontario	first
20	(Canada)	Dave Poulin – C	C	L	26	1982–83	Timmins, Ontario	first
26	(Canada)	Brian Propp	LW	L	26	1979	Lanigan, Saskatchewan	second (1980)
23	(Finland)	Ilkka Sinisalo	RW	L	26	1981–82	Valkeakoski, Finland	first
24	(Canada)	Derrick Smith	LW	L	20	1983	Scarborough, Ontario	first
15	(Canada)	Rich Sutter	LW	R	21	1983–84	Viking, Alberta	first
14	(Canada)	Ron Sutter	C	R	21	1982	Viking, Alberta	first
22	(Canada)	Rick Tocchet	RW	R	21	1983	Scarborough, Ontario	first
25	(Canada)	Peter Zezel	C	L	20	1983	Scarborough, Ontario	first

== Stanley Cup engraving ==
The 1985 Stanley Cup was presented to Oilers captain Wayne Gretzky by NHL President John Ziegler following the Oilers 8–3 win over the Flyers in game five.

The following Oilers players and staff had their names engraved on the Stanley Cup

1984–85 Edmonton Oilers

=== Players ===
Centres

- 99 Wayne Gretzky (Captain)
- 26 Mike Krushelnyski
- 24 Kevin McClelland
- 11 Mark Messier*
- 20 Billy Carroll*

Wingers

- 8 Dave Lumley
- 9 Glenn Anderson
- 10 Jaroslav Pouzar
- 12 Dave Hunter
- 14 Esa Tikkanen
- 16 Pat Hughes
- 17 Jari Kurri
- 18 Mark Napier
- 19 Willy Lindstrom
- 27 Dave Semenko

Defencemen

- 2 Lee Fogolin Jr.
- 4 Kevin Lowe
- 7 Paul Coffey
- 21 Randy Gregg
- 22 Charlie Huddy
- 29 Don Jackson
- 28 Larry Melnyk

Goaltenders

- 31 Grant Fuhr
- 35 Andy Moog
- * Played both centre and wing.

=== Coaching and administrative staff ===
- Peter Pocklington (Owner),
- Glen Sather (President/General Manager/Head Coach)
- Bruce MacGregor (Asst. General Manager)
- John Muckler (Asst. Coach), Edward Ted Green (Asst. Coach)
- Barry Fraser (Director of Player Personnel/Chief Scout)
- Garnet "Ace" Bailey (Scout), Ed Chadwick (Scout), Lorne Davis (Scout), Matti Valsanen (Scout)
- Peter Millar (Athletic Therapist), Dr. Gordon Cameron (Team Physician)
- Barrie Stafford (Trainer), Lyle Kulchisky (Asst. Trainer)

=== Stanley Cup engraving ===
Garnet "Ace" Bailey, Ed Chadwick, Lorne Davis, Matti Valsanen (Scouts), Gordon Cameron (Team Physician) received rings with Edmonton in 1984. Their names however, were left off the Stanley Cup in 1984, but included in 1985.

== See also ==
- List of Stanley Cup champions
- 1984–85 NHL season

Preceded by Edmonton Oilers; 1984	Edmonton Oilers; Stanley Cup champions 1985	Succeeded by Montreal Canadiens; 1986
