= Dave Richter =

Canadian ice hockey player

- Born: April 8, 1960 (age 66) Winnipeg, Manitoba, Canada
- Height: 6 ft 5 in (196 cm)
- Weight: 215 lb (98 kg; 15 st 5 lb)
- Position: Defence
- Shot: Right
- Played for: St. Louis Blues; Vancouver Canucks; Philadelphia Flyers; Minnesota North Stars
- NHL draft: 205th overall, 1980; Minnesota North Stars
- Playing career: 1982–1991

David Richter (born April 8, 1960) is a retired professional ice hockey player. Originally from Winnipeg in Canada, he played 365 NHL games with the Minnesota North Stars, Philadelphia Flyers, Vancouver Canucks, and St. Louis Blues. He was drafted by the North Stars in the 1980 NHL entry draft. In November 1985, Richter and teammate Bo Berglund were traded to the Philadelphia Flyers in exchange for Todd Bergen and Ed Hospodar. He was primarily known as an enforcer.

== Career statistics ==
			Regular season					Playoffs
Season	Team	League	GP	G	A	Pts	PIM	GP	G	A	Pts	PIM
1978–79	University of Michigan	NCAA	25	2	1	3	35	—	—	—	—	—
1979–80	University of Michigan	NCAA	34	0	4	4	54	—	—	—	—	—
1980–81	University of Michigan	NCAA	36	2	13	15	56	—	—	—	—	—
1981–82	University of Michigan	NCAA	36	9	12	21	78	—	—	—	—	—
1981–82	Nashville South Stars	CHL	2	0	1	1	0	—	—	—	—	—
1981–82	Minnesota North Stars	NHL	3	0	0	0	11	—	—	—	—	—
1982–83	Minnesota North Stars	NHL	6	0	0	0	4	—	—	—	—	—
1982–83	Birmingham South Stars	CHL	69	6	17	23	211	13	3	1	4	36
1983–84	Minnesota North Stars	NHL	42	2	3	5	132	8	0	0	0	20
1983–84	Salt Lake Golden Eagles	CHL	10	1	4	5	39	—	—	—	—	—
1984–85	Minnesota North Stars	NHL	55	2	8	10	221	9	1	0	1	39
1984–85	Springfield Indians	AHL	3	0	0	0	2	—	—	—	—	—
1985–86	Minnesota North Stars	NHL	14	0	3	3	29	—	—	—	—	—
1985–86	Philadelphia Flyers	NHL	50	0	2	2	138	5	0	0	0	21
1986–87	Vancouver Canucks	NHL	78	2	15	17	172	—	—	—	—	—
1987–88	Vancouver Canucks	NHL	49	2	4	6	224	—	—	—	—	—
1988–89	St. Louis Blues	NHL	66	1	5	6	99	—	—	—	—	—
1989–90	St. Louis Blues	NHL	2	0	0	0	0	—	—	—	—	—
1989–90	Peoria Rivermen	IHL	9	1	4	5	30	—	—	—	—	—
1989–90	Wiener EV	Austria	10	0	0	0	2	—	—	—	—	—
1989–90	Phoenix Roadrunners	IHL	20	0	5	5	49	—	—	—	—	—
1989–90	Baltimore Skipjacks	AHL	13	0	1	1	13	—	—	—	—	—
1990–91	Albany Choppers	IHL	41	0	1	1	128	—	—	—	—	—
1990–91	Capital District Islanders	AHL	3	0	1	1	0	—	—	—	—	—
NHL totals			365	9	40	49	1,030	22	1	0	1	80
