= 1984–85 Edmonton Oilers season =

NHL team season

1984–85 Edmonton Oilers
- Stanley Cup champions
- Campbell Conference champions
- Smythe Division champions
- Division: 1st Smythe
- Conference: 1st Campbell
- 1984–85 record: 49–20–11
- Home record: 26–7–7
- Road record: 23–13–4
- Goals for: 401
- Goals against: 298

Team information
- General manager: Glen Sather
- Coach: Glen Sather
- Captain: Wayne Gretzky
- Alternate captains: None
- Arena: Northlands Coliseum
- Average attendance: 17,498 (100%)
- Minor league affiliate: Nova Scotia Oilers (AHL)

Team leaders
- Goals: Wayne Gretzky (73)
- Assists: Wayne Gretzky (135)
- Points: Wayne Gretzky (208)
- Penalty minutes: Kevin McClelland (205)
- Plus/minus: Wayne Gretzky (+98)
- Wins: Grant Fuhr (26)
- Goals against average: Andy Moog (3.30)

The 1984–85 Edmonton Oilers season was the Oilers' sixth season in the NHL, and they were coming off a Stanley Cup championship in 1983–84. Edmonton would win their fourth-straight Smythe Division title, and repeat as Stanley Cup champions, losing only 3 games in the entire playoffs while out scoring their opponents 98–52. On June 5, 2017, this team was voted by fans as the greatest NHL team ever, as part of the NHL's centennial celebrations.

== Regular season ==
For the fourth consecutive season, the Oilers scored over 400 goals (401) in a season; the Oilers remain the only NHL franchise in history to score 400+ goals in a season. The Oilers also let in 298 goals, their fewest since the 1981–82 season. The Oilers started the season with an NHL record 15-game unbeaten streak (12–0–3).

Wayne Gretzky earned 208 points, breaking the 200 point mark for the third time (of four) in his career; Gretzky remains the only NHL player in history to score 200+ points in a season. Gretzky won his fifth straight Art Ross Trophy, and his sixth consecutive Hart Trophy. Jari Kurri scored a career-high 71 goals and 135 points, and won the Lady Byng Trophy. Paul Coffey had 121 points (37 goals, 84 assists) en route to his first Norris Trophy win, of three in his career. On December 26, 1984, Coffey was the last defenceman in the 20th century to score four goals in one game. It occurred in a game versus the Calgary Flames.

In goal, Grant Fuhr and Andy Moog split time, with Fuhr leading the Oilers in wins with 26, while Moog led the team with a 3.30 GAA.

=== Season standings ===
Smythe Division
	GP	W	L	T	GF	GA	Pts
**Edmonton Oilers**	80	49	20	11	401	298	109
**Winnipeg Jets**	80	43	27	10	358	332	96
**Calgary Flames**	80	41	27	12	363	302	94
**Los Angeles Kings**	80	34	32	14	339	326	82
Vancouver Canucks	80	25	46	9	284	401	59

Note: GP = Games played, W = Wins, L = Losses, T = Ties, Pts = Points, GF = Goals for, GA = Goals against
Note: Teams that qualified for the playoffs are highlighted in bold.

=== Record vs. opponents ===
Smythe Division record vs. opponents

==== Vs. Campbell Conference ====
**Vs. Smythe Division**

1984–85 NHL records
Team	**CGY**	**EDM**	**LAK**	**VAN**	**WIN**	**Total**
Calgary	—	1−6−1	4−3−1	7−0−1	5−1−2	**17−10−5**
Edmonton	6−1−1	—	4−3−1	3−3−2	5−3	**18−10−4**
Los Angeles	3−4−1	3−4−1	—	4−2−2	2−4−2	**12−14−6**
Vancouver	0−7−1	3−3−2	2−4−2	—	2−5−1	**7−19−6**
Winnipeg	1−5−2	3−5	4−2−2	5−2−1	—	**13−14−5**

**Vs. Norris Division**

1984–85 NHL records
Team	**CHI**	**DET**	**MIN**	**STL**	**TOR**	**Total**
Calgary	1−2	2−1	1−0−2	0−3	3−0	**7−6−2**
Edmonton	3−0	3−0	3−0	3−0	2−0−1	**14−0−1**
Los Angeles	0−2−1	2−1	1−1−1	1−2	2−1	**6−7−2**
Vancouver	1−2	1−2	1−1−1	0−3	1−1−1	**4−9−2**
Winnipeg	1−1−1	2−0−1	2−1	0−1−2	3−0	**8−3−4**

**Vs. Wales Conference**

**Vs. Adams Division**

1984–85 NHL records
Team	**BOS**	**BUF**	**HFD**	**MTL**	**QUE**	**Total**
Calgary	3−0	0−3	3−0	2−0−1	1−1−1	**9−4−2**
Edmonton	2−1	2−0−1	2−1	1−2	3−0	**10−4−1**
Los Angeles	0−1−2	2−0−1	2−0−1	0−2−1	1−2	**5−5−5**
Vancouver	1−2	2−0−1	2−1	2−1	1−2	**8−6−1**
Winnipeg	2−1	2−1	2−1	1−2	2−1	**9−6−0**

**Vs. Patrick Division**

1984–85 NHL records
Team	**NJD**	**NYI**	**NYR**	**PHI**	**PIT**	**WSH**	**Total**
Calgary	2−0−1	2−1	2−0−1	1−2	0−2−1	1−2	**8−7−3**
Edmonton	2−1	2−0−1	1−1−1	0−3	1−1−1	1−0−2	**7−6−5**
Los Angeles	3−0	1−2	2−1	1−1−1	3−0	1−2	**11−6−1**
Vancouver	3−0	1−2	1−2	0−3	1−2	0−3	**6−12−0**
Winnipeg	2−0−1	1−2	3−0	3−0	2−1	2−1	**13−4−1**

== Schedule and results ==
1984–85 regular season
October: 8–0–2 (home: 6–0–1; road: 2–0–1)

Game	Date	Visitor	Score	Home	OT	Decision	Attendance	Record	Pts	Recap
1	October 11	Edmonton Oilers	2 – 2	Los Angeles Kings	OT	Fuhr	11,261	0–0–1	1	
2	October 12	St. Louis Blues	1 – 5	Edmonton Oilers		Moog	17,498	1–0–1	3	
3	October 14	Quebec Nordiques	2 – 9	Edmonton Oilers		Fuhr	17,498	2–0–1	5	
4	October 16	Boston Bruins	2 – 7	Edmonton Oilers		Moog	17,498	3–0–1	7	
5	October 18	Edmonton Oilers	7 – 5	Minnesota North Stars		Fuhr	14,279	4–0–1	9	
6	October 19	Edmonton Oilers	7 – 4	Winnipeg Jets		Moog	15,441	5–0–1	11	
7	October 21	Calgary Flames	4 – 6	Edmonton Oilers		Fuhr	17,498	6–0–1	13	
8	October 24	Washington Capitals	3 – 3	Edmonton Oilers	OT	Moog	17,498	6–0–2	14	
9	October 26	Los Angeles Kings	2 – 8	Edmonton Oilers		Fuhr	17,498	7–0–2	16	
10	October 30	Vancouver Canucks	0 – 7	Edmonton Oilers		Moog	17,498	8–0–2	18	

November: 10–3–1 (home: 4–1–0; road: 6–2–1)

Game	Date	Visitor	Score	Home	OT	Decision	Attendance	Record	Pts	Recap
11	November 2	Chicago Black Hawks	2 – 4	Edmonton Oilers		Fuhr	17,498	9–0–2	20	
12	November 4	Edmonton Oilers	2 – 1	Winnipeg Jets		Moog	14,176	10–0–2	22	
13	November 6	Edmonton Oilers	3 – 3	Pittsburgh Penguins	OT	Fuhr	16,033	10–0–3	23	
14	November 8	Edmonton Oilers	3 – 2	New Jersey Devils		Moog	14,848	11–0–3	25	
15	November 9	Edmonton Oilers	8 – 5	Washington Capitals		Fuhr	18,130	12–0–3	27	
16	November 11	Edmonton Oilers	5 – 7	Philadelphia Flyers		Moog	17,191	12–1–3	27	
17	November 14	Montreal Canadiens	4 – 2	Edmonton Oilers		Fuhr	17,498	12–2–3	27	
18	November 15	Edmonton Oilers	2 – 6	Calgary Flames		Moog	16,683	12–3–3	27	
19	November 17	Vancouver Canucks	0 – 7	Edmonton Oilers		Fuhr	17,498	13–3–3	29	
20	November 21	Winnipeg Jets	5 – 7	Edmonton Oilers		Moog	17,498	14–3–3	31	
21	November 24	St. Louis Blues	6 – 7	Edmonton Oilers		Fuhr	17,498	15–3–3	33	
22	November 27	Edmonton Oilers	7 – 1	Toronto Maple Leafs		Moog	16,182	16–3–3	35	
23	November 29	Edmonton Oilers	4 – 2	Boston Bruins		Fuhr	14,451	17–3–3	37	
24	November 30	Edmonton Oilers	4 – 2	Hartford Whalers		Moog	14,817	18–3–3	39	

December: 7–4–1 (home: 5–1–0; road: 2–3–1)

Game	Date	Visitor	Score	Home	OT	Decision	Attendance	Record	Pts	Recap
25	December 5	New York Islanders	4 – 6	Edmonton Oilers		Fuhr	17,498	19–3–3	41	
26	December 7	Minnesota North Stars	3 – 6	Edmonton Oilers		Moog	17,498	20–3–3	43	
27	December 8	Edmonton Oilers	2 – 3	Vancouver Canucks	OT	Fuhr	13,851	20–4–3	43	
28	December 13	Edmonton Oilers	2 – 7	Los Angeles Kings		Fuhr	15,125	20–5–3	43	
29	December 15	Edmonton Oilers	8 – 2	St. Louis Blues		Moog	17,948	21–5–3	45	
30	December 17	Edmonton Oilers	2 – 5	New Jersey Devils		Fuhr	12,167	21–6–3	45	
31	December 19	Los Angeles Kings	3 – 7	Edmonton Oilers		Moog	17,498	22–6–3	47	
32	December 21	Vancouver Canucks	3 – 1	Edmonton Oilers		Fuhr	17,498	22–7–3	47	
33	December 22	Calgary Flames	1 – 7	Edmonton Oilers		Moog	17,498	23–7–3	49	
34	December 26	Edmonton Oilers	6 – 5	Calgary Flames		Fuhr	16,683	24–7–3	51	
35	December 29	Detroit Red Wings	3 – 6	Edmonton Oilers		Moog	17,498	25–7–3	53	
36	December 30	Edmonton Oilers	7 – 7	Vancouver Canucks	OT	Fuhr	16,005	25–7–4	54	

January: 11–2–2 (home: 6–1–1; road: 5–1–1)

Game	Date	Visitor	Score	Home	OT	Decision	Attendance	Record	Pts	Recap
37	January 2	Philadelphia Flyers	5 – 2	Edmonton Oilers		Moog	17,498	25–8–4	54	
38	January 4	Winnipeg Jets	4 – 7	Edmonton Oilers		Moog	17,498	26–8–4	56	
39	January 6	Edmonton Oilers	7 – 2	Winnipeg Jets		Fuhr	14,846	27–8–4	58	
40	January 8	Edmonton Oilers	4 – 0	Quebec Nordiques		Moog	15,360	28–8–4	60	
41	January 10	Edmonton Oilers	5 – 2	Montreal Canadiens		Fuhr	18,084	29–8–4	62	
42	January 12	Edmonton Oilers	3 – 4	Pittsburgh Penguins		Moog	16,033	29–9–4	62	
43	January 13	Edmonton Oilers	5 – 4	Buffalo Sabres		Fuhr	16,433	30–9–4	64	
44	January 16	New York Islanders	3 – 3	Edmonton Oilers	OT	Fuhr	17,498	30–9–5	65	
45	January 18	Edmonton Oilers	4 – 4	Vancouver Canucks	OT	Moog	14,067	30–9–6	66	
46	January 19	Vancouver Canucks	5 – 7	Edmonton Oilers		Fuhr	17,498	31–9–6	68	
47	January 21	Los Angeles Kings	7 – 8	Edmonton Oilers		Fuhr	17,498	32–9–6	70	
48	January 25	New Jersey Devils	2 – 4	Edmonton Oilers		Moog	17,498	33–9–6	72	
49	January 26	Pittsburgh Penguins	3 – 6	Edmonton Oilers		Fuhr	17,498	34–9–6	74	
50	January 28	Calgary Flames	3 – 4	Edmonton Oilers		Moog	17,498	35–9–6	76	
51	January 29	Edmonton Oilers	4 – 2	Calgary Flames		Fuhr	16,683	36–9–6	78	

February: 7–4–1 (home: 3–1–1; road: 4–3–0)

Game	Date	Visitor	Score	Home	OT	Decision	Attendance	Record	Pts	Recap
52	February 2	New York Rangers	1 – 5	Edmonton Oilers		Moog	17,498	37–9–6	80	
53	February 3	Hartford Whalers	3 – 6	Edmonton Oilers		Fuhr	17,498	38–9–6	82	
54	February 6	Edmonton Oilers	2 – 6	Winnipeg Jets		Moog	13,998	38–10–6	82	
55	February 8	Edmonton Oilers	5 – 3	Minnesota North Stars		Fuhr	15,784	39–10–6	84	
56	February 9	Edmonton Oilers	6 – 5	Detroit Red Wings		Moog	20,794	40–10–6	86	
57	February 15	Edmonton Oilers	7 – 8	New York Rangers		Moog	17,412	40–11–6	86	
58	February 16	Edmonton Oilers	4 – 5	Philadelphia Flyers		Moog	17,191	40–12–6	86	
59	February 18	Edmonton Oilers	6 – 4	Buffalo Sabres		Fuhr	16,433	41–12–6	88	
60	February 19	Edmonton Oilers	9 – 4	Toronto Maple Leafs		Moog	16,182	42–12–6	90	
61	February 22	Quebec Nordiques	3 – 6	Edmonton Oilers		Moog	17,498	43–12–6	92	
62	February 23	Washington Capitals	3 – 3	Edmonton Oilers	OT	Moog	17,498	43–12–7	93	
63	February 27	Montreal Canadiens	4 – 1	Edmonton Oilers		Moog	17,498	43–13–7	93	

March: 5–6–3 (home: 2–2–3; road: 3–4–0)

Game	Date	Visitor	Score	Home	OT	Decision	Attendance	Record	Pts	Recap
64	March 1	Los Angeles Kings	5 – 4	Edmonton Oilers		Baron	17,498	43–14–7	93	
65	March 3	Winnipeg Jets	6 – 3	Edmonton Oilers		Reaugh	17,498	43–15–7	93	
66	March 5	Edmonton Oilers	5 – 3	Calgary Flames		Zanier	16,683	44–15–7	95	
67	March 9	New York Rangers	3 – 3	Edmonton Oilers	OT	Zanier	17,498	44–15–8	96	
68	March 10	Edmonton Oilers	3 – 6	Vancouver Canucks		Zanier	14,861	44–16–8	96	
69	March 13	Detroit Red Wings	6 – 7	Edmonton Oilers		Fuhr	17,498	45–16–8	98	
70	March 15	Buffalo Sabres	4 – 4	Edmonton Oilers	OT	Fuhr	17,498	45–16–9	99	
71	March 17	Edmonton Oilers	4 – 5	Los Angeles Kings		Fuhr	16,500	45–17–9	99	
72	March 20	Chicago Black Hawks	4 – 6	Edmonton Oilers		Fuhr	17,498	46–17–9	101	
73	March 22	Toronto Maple Leafs	3 – 3	Edmonton Oilers	OT	Fuhr	17,498	46–17–10	102	
74	March 26	Edmonton Oilers	7 – 5	New York Islanders		Fuhr	16,002	47–17–10	104	
75	March 28	Edmonton Oilers	3 – 6	Boston Bruins		Moog	14,218	47–18–10	104	
76	March 29	Edmonton Oilers	7 – 8	Hartford Whalers		Fuhr	14,817	47–19–10	104	
77	March 31	Edmonton Oilers	7 – 3	Chicago Black Hawks		Fuhr	17,922	48–19–10	106	

April: 1–1–1 (home: 0–1–1; road: 1–0–0)

Game	Date	Visitor	Score	Home	OT	Decision	Attendance	Record	Pts	Recap
78	April 2	Edmonton Oilers	6 – 4	Los Angeles Kings		Fuhr	14,835	49–19–10	108	
79	April 5	Calgary Flames	5 – 5	Edmonton Oilers	OT	Fuhr	17,498	49–19–11	109	
80	April 6	Winnipeg Jets	6 – 5	Edmonton Oilers		Fuhr	17,498	49–20–11	109	

Legend: Win (2 points) Loss (0 points) Tie (1 point)

== Playoffs ==
In the playoffs, the Oilers swept past the Los Angeles Kings and the Winnipeg Jets in the first two rounds. Edmonton ran into a bit of a problem with the Chicago Black Hawks in the Conference Finals, as the teams split the first four games, with each team winning two at home, however, the Oilers won the next two games and advance to their third straight Stanley Cup Final. After losing the opening game of the Stanley Cup Final against the Philadelphia Flyers, the Oilers stepped up their play and won the next four games to win their second straight Stanley Cup. Wayne Gretzky won the Conn Smythe Trophy for the first time in his career, as he scored an NHL record 47 points (17G-30A) in the playoffs.

1985 Stanley Cup playoffs
Smythe Division Semifinals vs. (S4) Los Angeles Kings – Oilers win 3–0

Game	Date	Visitor	Score	Home	OT	Decision	Attendance	Series	Recap
1	April 10	Los Angeles Kings	2 – 3	Edmonton Oilers	OT	Fuhr	17,267	1–0	
2	April 11	Los Angeles Kings	2 – 4	Edmonton Oilers		Fuhr	17,314	2–0	
3	April 13	Edmonton Oilers	4 – 3	Los Angeles Kings	OT	Fuhr	16,005	3–0	

Smythe Division Finals vs. (S2) Winnipeg Jets – Oilers win 4–0

Game	Date	Visitor	Score	Home	OT	Decision	Attendance	Series	Recap
1	April 18	Winnipeg Jets	2 – 4	Edmonton Oilers		Fuhr	16,236	1–0	
2	April 20	Winnipeg Jets	2 – 5	Edmonton Oilers		Fuhr	16,942	2–0	
3	April 23	Edmonton Oilers	5 – 4	Winnipeg Jets		Fuhr	15,418	3–0	
4	April 25	Edmonton Oilers	8 – 3	Winnipeg Jets		Fuhr	15,519	4–0	

Campbell Conference Finals vs. (N2) Chicago Black Hawks – Oilers win 4–2

Game	Date	Visitor	Score	Home	OT	Decision	Attendance	Series	Recap
1	May 4	Chicago Black Hawks	2 – 11	Edmonton Oilers		Fuhr	17,308	1–0	
2	May 7	Chicago Black Hawks	3 – 7	Edmonton Oilers		Fuhr	17,211	2–0	
3	May 9	Edmonton Oilers	2 – 5	Chicago Black Hawks		Fuhr	17,794	2–1	
4	May 12	Edmonton Oilers	6 – 8	Chicago Black Hawks		Fuhr	17,894	2–2	
5	May 14	Chicago Black Hawks	5 – 10	Edmonton Oilers		Fuhr	17,245	3–2	
6	May 16	Edmonton Oilers	8 – 2	Chicago Black Hawks		Fuhr	17,922	4–2	

Stanley Cup Final vs. (P1) Philadelphia Flyers – Oilers win 4–1

Game	Date	Visitor	Score	Home	OT	Decision	Attendance	Series	Recap
1	May 21	Edmonton Oilers	1 – 4	Philadelphia Flyers		Fuhr	17,191	0–1	
2	May 23	Edmonton Oilers	3 – 1	Philadelphia Flyers		Fuhr	17,191	1–1	
3	May 25	Philadelphia Flyers	3 – 4	Edmonton Oilers		Fuhr	17,498	2–1	
4	May 28	Philadelphia Flyers	3 – 5	Edmonton Oilers		Fuhr	17,498	3–1	
5	May 30	Philadelphia Flyers	3 – 8	Edmonton Oilers		Fuhr	17,498	4–1	

Legend: Win Loss

== Player statistics ==
=== Regular season ===
Scoring leaders

Player	GP	G	A	Pts	PIM
Wayne Gretzky	80	73	135	208	52
Jari Kurri	73	71	64	135	30
Paul Coffey	80	37	84	121	97
Mike Krushelnyski	80	43	45	88	60
Glenn Anderson	80	42	39	81	69

Goaltending

Player	GP	TOI	W	L	T	GA	SO	Save %	GAA
Andy Moog	39	2019	22	9	3	111	1	.894	3.30
Marco Baron	1	33	0	1	0	2	0	.778	3.64
Grant Fuhr	46	2559	26	8	7	165	1	.884	3.87
Mike Zanier	3	185	1	1	1	12	0	.880	3.89
Daryl Reaugh	1	60	0	1	0	5	0	.857	5.00

=== Playoffs ===
Scoring leaders

Player	GP	G	A	Pts	PIM
Wayne Gretzky	18	17	30	47	4
Paul Coffey	18	12	25	37	44
Jari Kurri	18	19	12	31	6
Glenn Anderson	18	10	16	26	38
Mark Messier	18	12	13	25	12

Goaltending

Player	GP	TOI	W	L	GA	SO	Save %	GAA
Andy Moog	2	20	0	0	0	0	1.000	0.00
Grant Fuhr	18	1064	15	3	55	0	.895	3.10

== Awards and records ==
=== Records ===
- 205: An Oilers record for most penalty minutes in a single season by Kevin McClelland.

- 197: A new Oilers record for most penalty minutes in a single season by Kevin McClelland on March 31, 1985.

- 135: An NHL record for most assists in a single season by Wayne Gretzky.

- 126: A new NHL record for most assists in a single season by Wayne Gretzky on March 29, 1985.

- 47: An NHL record for most points in a playoffs by Wayne Gretzky.

- 39: A new NHL record for most points in a playoffs by Wayne Gretzky on May 25, 1985.

- 30: An NHL record for most assists in a playoffs by Wayne Gretzky.

- 27: A new NHL record for most assists in a playoffs by Wayne Gretzky on May 25, 1985.

- 19: Tied NHL record for most goals in a single playoffs by Jari Kurri on May 30, 1985.

=== Milestones ===
Regular Season
Player	Milestone	Reached
Gord Sherven	1st NHL Hat-trick	October 14, 1984
Wayne Gretzky	29th NHL Hat-trick	October 18, 1984
Jari Kurri	10th NHL Hat-trick	October 19, 1984
Wayne Gretzky	400th NHL Game	October 21, 1984
Gord Sherven	1st NHL Assist	October 24, 1984
Glenn Anderson	300th NHL Game	October 30, 1984
Jari Kurri	400th NHL Point; 300th NHL Game	October 30, 1984
Glenn Anderson	9th NHL Hat-trick	November 2, 1984
Kevin McClelland	300th NHL PIM	November 2, 1984
Mark Messier	400th NHL Point	November 2, 1984
Jari Kurri	11th NHL Hat-trick	November 9, 1984
Kevin Lowe	400th NHL Game	November 14, 1984
Dave Hunter	500th NHL PIM	November 15, 1984
Dave Semenko	700th NHL PIM	November 15, 1984
Glenn Anderson	200th NHL Assist	November 17, 1984
Dave Hunter	400th NHL Game	November 17, 1984
Charlie Huddy	100th NHL Assist	November 24, 1984
Wayne Gretzky	30th NHL Hat-trick	November 27, 1984
Wayne Gretzky	600th NHL Assist	November 29, 1984
Dave Hunter	200th NHL Point	November 29, 1984
Wayne Gretzky	31st NHL Hat-trick; 3rd Five-Goal NHL Game	December 15, 1984
Willy Lindstrom	400th NHL Game	December 15, 1984
Don Jackson	200th NHL Game	December 17, 1984
Mark Messier	600th NHL PIM	December 17, 1984
Wayne Gretzky	1,000th NHL Point	December 19, 1984
Mike Krushelnyski	2nd NHL Gordie Howe hat trick	December 19, 1984
Paul Coffey	2nd NHL Hat-trick; 1st Four-Goal NHL Game	December 26, 1984
Wayne Gretzky	32nd NHL Hat-trick; 5th NHL Natural Hat-trick	December 29, 1984
Steve Smith	1st NHL Game	December 29, 1984
Mike Krushelnyski	200th NHL Game	January 4, 1985
Jari Kurri	200th NHL Goal	January 4, 1985
Glenn Anderson	400th NHL Point	January 6, 1985
Lee Fogolin	1,100th NHL PIM	January 8, 1985
Mark Messier	400th NHL Game	January 8, 1985
Kevin McClelland	2nd NHL Gordie Howe hat trick	January 10, 1985
Wayne Gretzky	400th NHL Goal	January 13, 1985
Paul Coffey	400th NHL Point	January 18, 1985
Lee Fogolin	200th NHL Point	January 21, 1985
Wayne Gretzky	50th Goal in 49 Games; 33rd NHL Hat-trick	January 26, 1985
Kevin Lowe	400th NHL PIM	January 26, 1985
Jari Kurri	12th NHL Hat-trick	January 29, 1985
Mike Krushelnyski	1st NHL Hat-trick	February 2, 1985
Jari Kurri	50th Goal in 53 Games	February 3, 1985
Paul Coffey	500th NHL PIM	February 9, 1985
Mike Krushelnyski	100th NHL Assist	February 15, 1985
Glenn Anderson	200th NHL Goal	February 16, 1985
Glenn Anderson	10th NHL Hat-trick	February 19, 1985
Jari Kurri	13th NHL Hat-trick	February 19, 1985
Dave Semenko	800th NHL PIM	February 19, 1985
Kevin McClelland	400th NHL PIM	February 22, 1985
Wayne Gretzky	200th NHL PIM	February 23, 1985
Kevin Lowe	200th NHL Point	February 23, 1985
Paul Coffey	300th NHL Assist	February 27, 1985
Randy Gregg	200th NHL Game	February 27, 1985
Don Jackson	400th NHL PIM	February 27, 1985
Daryl Reaugh	1st NHL Game	March 3, 1985
Mike Zanier	1st NHL Game; 1st NHL Win	March 5, 1985
Jari Kurri	500th NHL Point	March 13, 1985
Wayne Gretzky	1,100th NHL Point	March 17, 1985
Glenn Anderson	11th NHL Hat-trick	March 20, 1985
Mark Napier	400th NHL Point	March 26, 1985
Paul Coffey	3rd NHL Hat-trick	March 31, 1985
Larry Melnyk	100th NHL Game	March 31, 1985
Mark Napier	100th NHL PIM	March 31, 1985
Wayne Gretzky	34th NHL Hat-trick	April 2, 1985
Mike Krushelnyski	200th NHL Point	April 2, 1985
Lee Fogolin	800th NHL Game	April 6, 1985

Playoffs
Player	Milestone	Reached
Glenn Anderson	50th NHL Game	April 10, 1985
Paul Coffey	50th NHL Game	April 10, 1985
Jari Kurri	50th NHL Game	April 10, 1985
Dave Semenko	50th NHL Game	April 10, 1985
Lee Fogolin	150th NHL PIM	April 13, 1985
Paul Coffey	50th NHL Point	April 18, 1985
Grant Fuhr	5th NHL Assist	April 20, 1985
Kevin McClelland	50th NHL PIM	April 20, 1985
Mark Napier	50th NHL Game	April 20, 1985
Randy Gregg	50th NHL PIM	April 25, 1985
Wayne Gretzky	5th NHL Hat-trick	April 25, 1985
Jari Kurri	2nd NHL Hat-trick	April 25, 1985
Jari Kurri	3rd NHL Hat-trick	May 7, 1985
Larry Melnyk	1st NHL Goal	May 7, 1985
Randy Gregg	50th NHL Game	May 12, 1985
Willy Lindstrom	50th NHL Game	May 12, 1985
Glenn Anderson	100th NHL PIM	May 14, 1985
Jari Kurri	4th NHL Hat-trick	May 14, 1985
Paul Coffey	100th NHL PIM	May 16, 1985
Jari Kurri	5th NHL Hat-trick; 1st Four-Goal NHL Game	May 16, 1985
Don Jackson	100th NHL PIM	May 21, 1985
Wayne Gretzky	50th NHL Goal	May 23, 1985
Dave Hunter	150th NHL PIM	May 23, 1985
Esa Tikkanen	1st NHL Game	May 23, 1985
Jari Kurri	50th NHL Assist	May 28, 1985
Wayne Gretzky	150th NHL Point; 6th NHL Hat-trick	May 25, 1985
Dave Semenko	150th NHL PIM	May 25, 1985
Paul Coffey	50th NHL Assist	May 30, 1985
Lee Fogolin	100th NHL Game	May 30, 1985
Wayne Gretzky	100th NHL Assist	May 30, 1985
Charlie Huddy	50th NHL Game	May 30, 1985
Jari Kurri	100th NHL Point	May 30, 1985
Kevin McClelland	100th NHL PIM	May 30, 1985

== Transactions ==
=== Trades ===
June 21, 1984	To Boston Bruins Ken Linseman	To Edmonton Oilers Mike Krushelnyski
October 27, 1984	To Detroit Red Wings Todd Bidner	To Edmonton Oilers Rejean Cloutier
November 27, 1984	To Los Angeles Kings Cash	To Edmonton Oilers Dean Hopkins
November 27, 1984	To New York Rangers Cash	To Edmonton Oilers Mark Morrison
January 24, 1985	To Minnesota North Stars Gord Sherven; Terry Martin	To Edmonton Oilers Mark Napier
March 31, 1985	To Los Angeles Kings Dean Hopkins	To Edmonton Oilers Future considerations

=== Free agents ===
Player	Former team
F Jeff Brubaker	Calgary Flames
F Norm Aubin	Toronto Maple Leafs
F Craig MacTavish	Boston Bruins
G Marco Baron	Los Angeles Kings

Player	New team
D Peter Dineen	Boston Bruins
F Al Hill	Philadelphia Flyers
D Joe McDonnell	Pittsburgh Penguins
F Serge Boisvert	Montreal Canadiens
F Tom Gorence	New Jersey Devils

=== Waivers ===
Date	Player	Team
October 9, 1984	Jeff Brubaker	to Toronto Maple Leafs
October 9, 1984	Billy Carroll	from New York Islanders
October 9, 1984	Dave Lumley	to Hartford Whalers
October 9, 1984	Terry Martin	from Toronto Maple Leafs
December 5, 1984	Tony Currie	from Hartford Whalers
February 6, 1985	Dave Lumley	from Hartford Whalers

== Draft picks ==
Edmonton's draft picks at the 1984 NHL entry draft.

Round	#	Player	Nationality	College/junior/club team (league)
1	21	Selmar Odelein	Canada	Regina Pats (WHL)
2	42	Daryl Reaugh	Canada	Kamloops Junior Oilers (WHL)
3	63	Todd Norman	United States	Hill-Murray School (USHS)
4	84	Richard Novak	Canada	Richmond Sockeyes (BCJHL)
5	105	Rick Lambert	Canada	Father Henry Carr High School (Canada)
6	106	Emanuel Viveiros	Canada	Prince Albert Raiders (WHL)
6	126	Ivan Dornic	Czechoslovakia	HK Dukla Trenčín (Czechoslovak Extraliga)
7	147	Heikki Riihijarvi	Finland	Oulun Kärpät (SM-liiga)
8	168	Todd Ewen	Canada	New Westminster Bruins (WHL)
10	209	Joel Curtis	Canada	Oshawa Generals (OHL)
11	229	Simon Wheeldon	Canada	Victoria Cougars (WHL)
12	250	Darren Gani	Canada	Belleville Bulls (OHL)
