= Todd Bergen =

Canadian ice hockey player

- Born: July 11, 1963 (age 62) Prince Albert, Saskatchewan, Canada
- Height: 6 ft 3 in (191 cm)
- Weight: 185 lb (84 kg; 13 st 3 lb)
- Position: Centre
- Shot: Left
- Played for: Philadelphia Flyers
- NHL draft: 98th overall, 1982; Philadelphia Flyers
- Playing career: 1983–1987

Todd Bergen (born July 11, 1963) is a Canadian former professional ice hockey centre who had a short-lived career, most notably with the Philadelphia Flyers of the National Hockey League in 1984–85.

== Playing career ==
Bergen started off his notable career with the Prince Albert Raiders of the Western Hockey League. He had actually not played in an organized hockey league until he was 16 years old, but was able to make the Raiders just a couple of years later. He was drafted 98th overall by the Philadelphia Flyers in the 1982 NHL entry draft, even before he played a game with the Raiders. It did not take him long to produce for the Raiders, who were in their first season ever, as he scored 81 points in 70 games in his first season in 1982–83. The next year he got off to a torrid start, scoring 50 goals in his first 35 games of the season and finished the year with 57 goals and 96 points in only 43 games.

The next season, he started with the Hershey Bears of the American Hockey League, and once again put his scoring skills to work, scoring 20 goals and 39 points in only 38 games. He played well enough to get called up to the Philadelphia Flyers by January. In his first NHL game on January 8, 1985, he scored two goals including the game-winner in a 5–3 victory over the Vancouver Canucks in Philadelphia. However, the next game he suffered an abdominal injury that caused him to miss two months of play. After two months the injury did not heal, but he returned to action. Despite the pain he was in when he was playing, Bergen managed to score goals in each of his first three games back, as well as scoring five goals in the final four games of the regular season, and the team was undefeated after he returned. In the playoffs that year he led all rookies with 13 points, and helped the Flyers reach the 1985 Stanley Cup Finals.

However, Bergen often clashed with Flyers' coach Mike Keenan, whom Bergen felt criticized him far too often, and their relationship never improved. According to Bergen, Keenan made him do two-a-day workouts on and off the ice after he came back and made sure that players would stand guard to make sure that Bergen did what he was supposed to do, all while he still had his abdominal injury. As a result, Bergen refused to report to training camp the following year, and was promptly suspended by the Flyers. Bergen said he lost his love for the game because of Keenan and the Flyers, and announced his retirement in September 1985 to pursue a professional golfing career. He was then suspended by the Flyers for refusing to report to training camp. Bergen was a pretty good golfer, having only a minus-one handicap, and played in some Pro-Am tournaments in Florida. There was speculation that Bergen was holding out because he was trying to get away from Keenan, to which general manager Bobby Clarke responded, "Who am I gonna trade him for, Lee Trevino?" Bergen was traded by the Flyers (with Ed Hospodar) to the Minnesota North Stars for Dave Richter and Bo Berglund on November 29, 1985.

=== North Stars ===
He reported to the North Stars, but after his second practice with the team, the pain in his abdomen returned. The North Stars took an MRI, and found that Bergen's injury was more serious than many thought. He missed the whole 1985–86 season as a result. The next year, Bergen returned to play for the North Stars' AHL affiliate, the Springfield Indians. He managed to score 12 goals and 23 points in 27 games. However, when his contract expired after the season, the North Stars did not offer him a new one. Instead, Bergen quit hockey again, and once again moved on to play golf. He was a club pro in Prince Albert, then later on Vancouver Island.

== Personal ==
Bergen now owns a tackle business in Campbell River, British Columbia called Dymara Industries. In the December 14, 2004 issue of The Hockey News, there was a feature article by Mike Brophy remembering the career of Bergen and in a quote by Bergen in the article, "I didn't disappear; I got disappeared" to explain what happened to his NHL career.

== Career statistics ==
=== Regular season and playoffs ===
			Regular season					Playoffs
Season	Team	League	GP	G	A	Pts	PIM	GP	G	A	Pts	PIM
1981–82	Prince Albert Raiders	SJHL	59	30	62	92	35	—	—	—	—	—
1982–83	Prince Albert Raiders	WHL	70	34	47	81	17	—	—	—	—	—
1983–84	Prince Albert Raiders	WHL	43	57	39	96	15	5	2	5	7	4
1983–84	Springfield Indians	AHL	1	0	0	0	0	—	—	—	—	—
1984–85	Hershey Bears	AHL	38	20	19	39	2	—	—	—	—	—
1984–85	Philadelphia Flyers	NHL	14	11	5	16	4	17	4	9	13	8
1986–87	Springfield Indians	AHL	27	12	11	23	14	—	—	—	—	—
NHL totals			14	11	5	16	4	17	4	9	13	8
