= Murray Craven =

Canadian ice hockey player (born 1964)

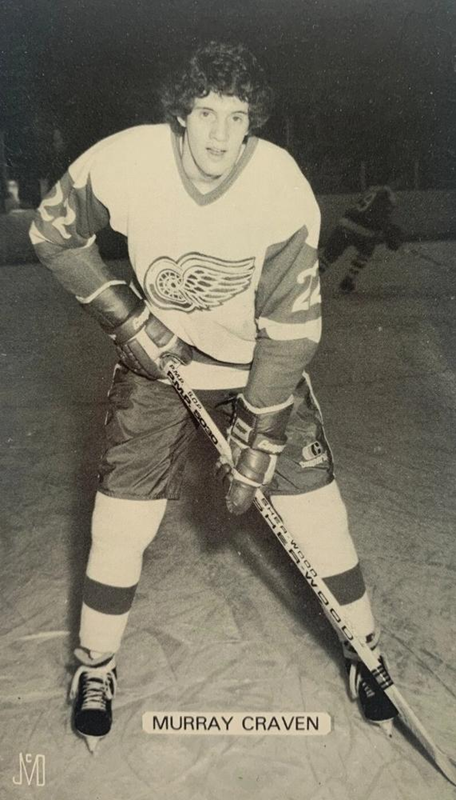
- Born: July 20, 1964 (age 61) Medicine Hat, Alberta, Canada
- Height: 6 ft 2 in (188 cm)
- Weight: 185 lb (84 kg; 13 st 3 lb)
- Position: Centre
- Shot: Left
- Played for: Detroit Red Wings; Philadelphia Flyers; Hartford Whalers; Vancouver Canucks; Chicago Blackhawks; San Jose Sharks
- National team: Canada
- NHL draft: 17th overall, 1982; Detroit Red Wings
- Playing career: 1982–2000

Murray Dean Craven (born July 20, 1964) is a Canadian former professional ice hockey centre who played 18 seasons in the National Hockey League between 1982–83 and 1999–2000 and the former vice president of the Vegas Golden Knights.

== Biography ==
Craven was born into a hockey family in Alberta, Canada. He joined the Medicine Hat Tigers in 1980, for which his father, Ron—then known as "Crafty Craven"—had previously played, and later coached. In 2018, his son, Joel, joined the same team.

== Playing career ==
Craven played his junior hockey with his hometown Medicine Hat Tigers, and his success there saw him selected by the Detroit Red Wings with their first-round pick (17th overall) in the 1982 NHL entry draft. He proceeded to make the Wings' NHL squad out of training camp at age 18, and recorded 4 goals and 11 points in 31 games before being returned to Medicine Hat. He would see 15 more games of NHL action in 1983–84, again splitting the year between Detroit and Medicine Hat. By this time he was dominating the WHL, recording 94 points in just 46 games.

=== Philadelphia Flyers ===
On the eve of the 1984–85 season, Craven was dealt to the Philadelphia Flyers as the centrepiece of a deal for aging superstar Darryl Sittler. The deal proved to be an absolute heist for Philadelphia, as Sittler struggled through one final season before retiring while Craven stepped straight into the Flyers' lineup as one of their top forwards. In his first full season, Craven finished 5th in team scoring with 61 points and added 10 more points in the playoffs helping lead the Flyers to the Stanley Cup Final, where they lost to the Edmonton Oilers.

Craven would spend 7+ successful seasons in Philadelphia, establishing himself as a top-notch two-way forward. He again helped the Flyers to the 1987 Stanley Cup Final, although he missed a large portion of the playoffs that year with a broken foot. In 1987–88, Craven had one of his finest seasons, reaching the 30-goal plateau for the only time in his career and leading the Flyers with 76 points. After an injury-plagued 1988–89 season, Craven recorded his first 50-assist campaign in 1989–90.

=== Post-Flyers career ===
However, by the early 1990s the Flyers' success of the 1980s was well behind them and they were in the midst of a stretch of five consecutive years out of the playoffs. Despite still playing well, Craven was a casualty of this period and was dealt to the Hartford Whalers for Kevin Dineen 12 games into the 1991–92 season. Craven would finish the season with 60 points, second on the Whalers.

Craven was again amongst the Whalers' leading scorers in 1992–93, but with the team about to miss the playoffs he was dealt to the Vancouver Canucks at the trade deadline. He finished the year setting career highs in assists (52) and points (77), and provided an offensive boost to the Canucks, although they were outed in the second round of the playoffs. In 1993–94, he scored 55 points for the Canucks and added 13 more in the playoffs en route to the Stanley Cup Final, where he came out on the losing end for the third time. He also had the unfortunate distinction of being on the losing end of the only two Cup Final series between 1971 and 2001 to go the full 7 games. The winning coach of the 1994 Finals, Mike Keenan, was coach of the Flyers in 1987.

Following the 1994–95 NHL lockout, Craven endured a lengthy holdout as a result of uncertainty over his free agency status. Eventually he was traded to the Chicago Blackhawks for Christian Ruuttu, although he was able to play in only 16 games. In the playoffs, he scored 10 points to help the Blackhawks to the Conference Finals, defeating Vancouver along the way.

Craven scored 47 points in his first full season in Chicago, but by the 1996–97 season he was being used primarily in a defensive role, and he finished the year with full-season career lows of just 8 goals and 35 points. Following that season, he was dealt to the San Jose Sharks. In San Jose, he continued to be a solid defensive forward, although he was increasingly hobbled by injuries. In 1998–99 he was limited to just 43 games and 13 points. Following a poor start (just 2 assists in 19 games) and a hernia surgery, he was released by San Jose midway through the 1999–2000 season, effectively ending his career.

Craven finished his NHL career with 266 goals and 493 assists for 759 points in 1071 games. He also added 27 goals and 70 points in 118 career playoff games.

=== Post-playing career ===
Following two years as advisor to Vegas Golden Knights owner Bill Foley, Craven was the team's senior vice president during 2016–2019. He had significant input on the design of City National Arena, the NHL expansion team's headquarters and practice facility, overseeing the project, and was lauded as the team's "master builder" by Sports Illustrated in 2017.

== Career statistics ==
=== Regular season and playoffs ===
| | | | Regular season | | | | | Playoffs |
| Season | Team | League | GP | G | A | Pts | PIM | GP | G | A | Pts | PIM |
|---|---|---|---|---|---|---|---|---|---|---|---|---|
| 1980–81 | Medicine Hat Tigers | WHL | 69 | 5 | 10 | 15 | 18 | 5 | 0 | 0 | 0 | 2 |
| 1981–82 | Medicine Hat Tigers | WHL | 72 | 35 | 46 | 81 | 49 | — | — | — | — | — |
| 1982–83 | Detroit Red Wings | NHL | 31 | 4 | 7 | 11 | 6 | — | — | — | — | — |
| 1982–83 | Medicine Hat Tigers | WHL | 28 | 17 | 29 | 46 | 35 | — | — | — | — | — |
| 1983–84 | Medicine Hat Tigers | WHL | 48 | 38 | 56 | 94 | 53 | 4 | 5 | 3 | 8 | 4 |
| 1983–84 | Detroit Red Wings | NHL | 15 | 0 | 4 | 4 | 6 | — | — | — | — | — |
| 1984–85 | Philadelphia Flyers | NHL | 80 | 26 | 35 | 61 | 30 | 19 | 4 | 6 | 10 | 11 |
| 1985–86 | Philadelphia Flyers | NHL | 78 | 21 | 33 | 54 | 34 | 5 | 0 | 3 | 3 | 4 |
| 1986–87 | Philadelphia Flyers | NHL | 77 | 19 | 39 | 49 | 38 | 12 | 3 | 1 | 4 | 9 |
| 1987–88 | Philadelphia Flyers | NHL | 72 | 30 | 46 | 76 | 58 | 7 | 2 | 5 | 7 | 4 |
| 1988–89 | Philadelphia Flyers | NHL | 51 | 9 | 28 | 37 | 52 | 1 | 0 | 0 | 0 | 2 |
| 1989–90 | Philadelphia Flyers | NHL | 76 | 25 | 50 | 75 | 42 | — | — | — | — | — |
| 1990–91 | Philadelphia Flyers | NHL | 77 | 19 | 47 | 66 | 53 | — | — | — | — | — |
| 1991–92 | Philadelphia Flyers | NHL | 12 | 3 | 3 | 6 | 8 | — | — | — | — | — |
| 1991–92 | Hartford Whalers | NHL | 61 | 24 | 30 | 54 | 38 | 7 | 3 | 3 | 6 | 6 |
| 1992–93 | Hartford Whalers | NHL | 67 | 25 | 42 | 67 | 20 | — | — | — | — | — |
| 1992–93 | Vancouver Canucks | NHL | 10 | 0 | 10 | 10 | 12 | 12 | 4 | 6 | 10 | 4 |
| 1993–94 | Vancouver Canucks | NHL | 78 | 15 | 40 | 55 | 30 | 22 | 4 | 9 | 13 | 18 |
| 1994–95 | Chicago Blackhawks | NHL | 16 | 4 | 3 | 7 | 2 | 16 | 5 | 5 | 10 | 4 |
| 1995–96 | Chicago Blackhawks | NHL | 66 | 18 | 29 | 47 | 36 | 9 | 1 | 4 | 5 | 2 |
| 1996–97 | Chicago Blackhawks | NHL | 75 | 8 | 27 | 35 | 12 | 2 | 0 | 0 | 0 | 2 |
| 1997–98 | San Jose Sharks | NHL | 67 | 12 | 17 | 29 | 25 | 6 | 1 | 1 | 2 | 0 |
| 1998–99 | San Jose Sharks | NHL | 43 | 4 | 10 | 14 | 18 | — | — | — | — | — |
| 1999–00 | San Jose Sharks | NHL | 19 | 0 | 2 | 2 | 4 | — | — | — | — | — |
| NHL totals | | | 1,071 | 266 | 493 | 759 | 524 | 118 | 27 | 43 | 70 | 66 |

=== International ===
| Year | Team | Event | GP | G | A | Pts | PIM |
|---|---|---|---|---|---|---|---|
| 1989 | Canada | WC | 9 | 1 | 5 | 6 | 6 |
| 1991 | Canada | WC | 9 | 1 | 1 | 2 | 10 |
| Senior totals | | | 18 | 2 | 6 | 8 | 16 |

== Awards ==
- WHL East Second All-Star Team – 1984

== See also ==
- List of NHL players with 1,000 games played

| Preceded by Mike Blaisdell | Detroit Red Wings first-round draft pick 1982 | Succeeded by Steve Yzerman |
