= Mike Krushelnyski =

Canadian ice hockey player (born 1960)

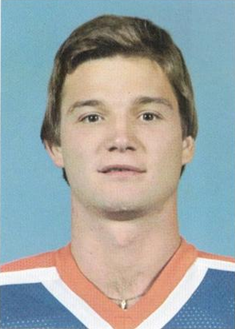
- Krushelnyski in 1984 photo
- Born: April 27, 1960 (age 66) Montreal, Quebec, Canada
- Height: 6 ft 2 in (188 cm)
- Weight: 200 lb (91 kg; 14 st 4 lb)
- Position: Left wing/Centre
- Shot: Left
- Played for: Boston Bruins; Edmonton Oilers; Los Angeles Kings; Toronto Maple Leafs; Detroit Red Wings
- NHL draft: 120th overall, 1979; Boston Bruins
- Playing career: 1980–1996

Michael "Kruzer" Krushelnyski (born April 27, 1960) is a Canadian former professional ice hockey centre/left winger who played 14 years in the National Hockey League (NHL). While playing in the NHL, he won three Stanley Cups as a player with the Edmonton Oilers and one as an assistant coach with the Detroit Red Wings. In a career of 897 games, Krushelnyski recorded 241 goals and 328 assists for 569 career points. He was born in Montreal, Quebec, but grew up in LaSalle, Quebec.

He is the father of the former ice hockey forward Alexander Krushelnyski.

== Playing career ==
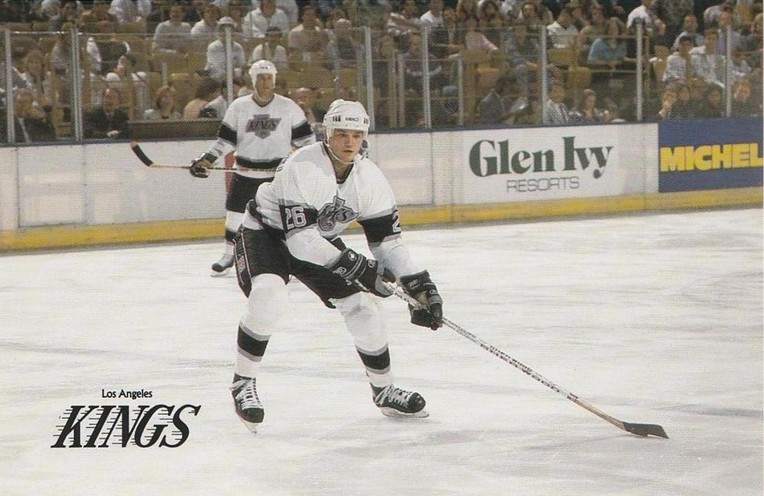
1988 postcard of Krushelnyski in action for Los Angeles Kings

As a youth, Krushelnyski played in the 1973 Quebec International Pee-Wee Hockey Tournament with a minor ice hockey team from LaSalle, Quebec. After being selected by the Boston Bruins in the 6th round, 120th overall, in the 1979 NHL entry draft, Krushelnyski played for the Springfield Indians and the Erie Blades in the American Hockey League (AHL).

Krushelnyski made his NHL debut on October 24, 1981, against the Montreal Canadiens. During the 1984–85 offseason, the Bruins traded Krushelnyski to the Edmonton Oilers in exchange for Ken Linseman. While playing left wing on the Oilers top line with Wayne Gretzky and Jari Kurri, Krushelnyski finished fourth on the team in scoring as he recorded a new career-high 43 goals and 88 points.

Krushelnyski won three Stanley Cups with the Edmonton Oilers in 1985, 1987, and 1988. Krushelnyski and Marty McSorley were part of the 1988 trade in which Wayne Gretzky (who had personally requested McSorley and Krushelnyski to be part of the trade) was sent to the Los Angeles Kings for two players, draft picks, and cash. He later played for the Toronto Maple Leafs and Detroit Red Wings before retiring after the 1995 season.

He is best remembered for scoring an overtime goal with the Kings that eliminated the heavily favored and defending Stanley Cup champion Calgary Flames from the 1990 Stanley Cup playoffs in the sixth game of the Smythe Division semifinal (leading to his former team, the Oilers, winning another Stanley Cup that season). Krushelnyski chipped the puck over Flames goaltender Mike Vernon at 3:14 of the second overtime while lying flat on the ice after being knocked down during a goalmouth scramble. CBC Hockey Night in Canada play-by-play announcer Chris Cuthbert called this goal in a dramatic fashion:

Granato shot – Krushelnyski to the net, and Vernon again made the save. Back it comes Duchesne shooting, Vernon kicks that out; rebound – THEY SCORE!!!!

== Post-retirement ==
After retiring, Krushelnyski was an assistant coach with Detroit when they won the Stanley Cup in 1997, but left after winning his fourth championship to become head coach of the Central Hockey League's Fort Worth Fire, a post he held until the team folded in 1999.

He coached the Vityaz Chekhov, in the Kontinental Hockey League, for the 2006-07 season and from November 2008 to December 2009. In between his two stints with the KHL, he was coach of the Ingolstadt Panthers, in Germany's top tier Deutsche Eishockey Liga.

In 2013, Krushelnyski competed in the 4th season of CBC's figure skating reality show Battle of the Blades. He was voted out on October 7, losing to Oksana Kazakova and Vladimir Malakhov.

== Awards and achievements ==
- 1984–85 - NHL - Stanley Cup (Edmonton)
- 1984–85 - NHL - Played in All Star Game
- 1986–87 - NHL - Stanley Cup (Edmonton)
- 1987–88 - NHL - Stanley Cup (Edmonton)
- 1997–98 - NHL - Stanley Cup (Detroit Red Wings) (assistant coach)

== Career statistics ==
			Regular season					Playoffs
Season	Team	League	GP	G	A	Pts	PIM	GP	G	A	Pts	PIM
1978–79	Montreal Juniors	QMJHL	46	15	29	44	42	11	3	4	7	8
1979–80	Montreal Juniors	QMJHL	72	39	60	99	78	6	2	3	5	2
1980–81	Springfield Indians	AHL	80	25	28	53	47	7	1	1	2	29
1981–82	Erie Blades	AHL	62	31	52	83	44	—	—	—	—	—
1981–82	Boston Bruins	NHL	17	3	3	6	2	1	0	0	0	2
1982–83	Boston Bruins	NHL	79	23	42	65	43	17	8	6	14	12
1983–84	Boston Bruins	NHL	66	25	20	45	55	2	0	0	0	0
1984–85	Edmonton Oilers	NHL	80	43	45	88	60	18	5	8	13	22
1985–86	Edmonton Oilers	NHL	54	16	24	40	22	10	4	5	9	16
1986–87	Edmonton Oilers	NHL	80	16	35	51	67	21	3	4	7	18
1987–88	Edmonton Oilers	NHL	76	20	27	47	64	19	4	6	10	12
1988–89	Los Angeles Kings	NHL	78	26	36	62	110	11	1	4	5	4
1989–90	Los Angeles Kings	NHL	63	16	25	41	50	10	1	3	4	12
1990–91	Los Angeles Kings	NHL	15	1	5	6	10	—	—	—	—	—
1990–91	Toronto Maple Leafs	NHL	59	17	22	39	48	—	—	—	—	—
1991–92	Toronto Maple Leafs	NHL	72	9	15	24	72	—	—	—	—	—
1992–93	Toronto Maple Leafs	NHL	84	19	20	39	62	16	3	7	10	8
1993–94	Toronto Maple Leafs	NHL	54	5	6	11	28	6	0	0	0	0
1994–95	Detroit Red Wings	NHL	20	2	3	5	6	8	0	0	0	0
1995–96	Cape Breton Oilers	AHL	50	16	25	41	78	—	—	—	—	—
1996–97	HC Milano Saima	ITA	2	0	0	0	0	—	—	—	—	—
NHL totals			897	241	328	569	699	139	29	43	72	106
