= Larry Melnyk =

Canadian ice hockey player

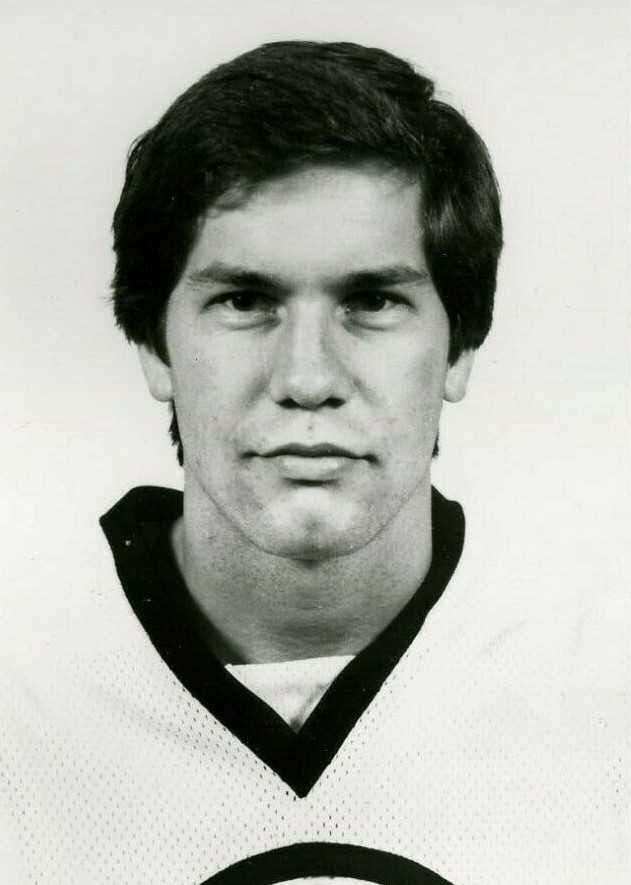
- Born: February 21, 1960 (age 66) Saskatoon, Saskatchewan, Canada
- Height: 6 ft 0 in (183 cm)
- Weight: 181 lb (82 kg; 12 st 13 lb)
- Position: Defence
- Shot: Left
- Played for: Boston Bruins; Edmonton Oilers; New York Rangers; Vancouver Canucks
- NHL draft: 78th overall, 1979; Boston Bruins
- Playing career: 1980–1990

Larry Joseph Melnyk (born February 21, 1960) is a Canadian former professional ice hockey player. He played in the National Hockey League for the Boston Bruins, Edmonton Oilers, New York Rangers, and Vancouver Canucks in a career that lasted from 1980 to 1990. With the Oilers he won the Stanley Cup in 1984 and 1985. Prior to turning professional Melnyk played major junior for the New Westminster Bruins of the Western Hockey League, winning the 1978 Memorial Cup with them. He was selected by Boston in the 1979 NHL entry draft. Internationally Melnyk played for Canada at the 1979 World Junior Championship.

== Playing career ==
He was born in Saskatoon, Saskatchewan, Melnyk started his National Hockey League career with the Boston Bruins in 1980. He also played for the Edmonton Oilers, New York Rangers, and Vancouver Canucks. He left the NHL after the 1990 season.

Melnyk won two Stanley Cup rings with Edmonton, in 1984 and 1985. In 1984, he spent the whole regular season in the minors. He was called up and played six playoff games. His name was not engraved on the Cup, because he had not played enough games to qualify. Melnyk joined Edmonton full-time midway through the 1985 season. He played in the Final and had his name engraved on the Cup that season.

== Career statistics ==
=== Regular season and playoffs ===
			Regular season					Playoffs
Season	Team	League	GP	G	A	Pts	PIM	GP	G	A	Pts	PIM
1977–78	Abbotsford Flyers	BCJHL	39	10	9	19	100	—	—	—	—	—
1977–78	New Westminster Bruins	WCHL	44	3	22	25	71	20	2	9	11	28
1978–79	New Westminster Bruins	WHL	71	7	33	40	142	8	1	4	5	14
1979–80	New Westminster Bruins	WHL	67	13	38	51	236	—	—	—	—	—
1979–80	Binghamton Dusters	AHL	6	0	3	3	20	—	—	—	—	—
1980–81	Boston Bruins	NHL	26	0	4	4	39	—	—	—	—	—
1980–81	Springfield Indians	AHL	47	1	10	11	109	1	0	0	0	0
1981–82	Boston Bruins	NHL	48	0	8	8	84	11	0	3	3	40
1981–82	Erie Blades	AHL	10	0	3	3	36	—	—	—	—	—
1982–83	Boston Bruins	NHL	1	0	0	0	0	—	—	—	—	—
1982–83	Baltimore Skipjacks	AHL	72	2	24	26	215	—	—	—	—	—
1983–84	Edmonton Oilers	NHL	—	—	—	—	—	6	0	1	1	0
1983–84	Hershey Bears	AHL	50	0	18	18	156	—	—	—	—	—
1983–84	Moncton Alpines	AHL	14	0	3	3	17	—	—	—	—	—
1984–85	Edmonton Oilers	NHL	28	0	11	11	25	12	1	3	4	26
1984–85	Nova Scotia Oilers	AHL	37	2	10	12	97	—	—	—	—	—
1985–86	Edmonton Oilers	NHL	6	2	3	5	11	—	—	—	—	—
1985–86	Nova Scotia Oilers	AHL	19	2	8	10	72	—	—	—	—	—
1985–86	New York Rangers	NHL	46	1	8	9	65	16	1	2	3	46
1986–87	New York Rangers	NHL	73	3	12	15	182	6	0	0	0	4
1987–88	New York Rangers	NHL	14	0	1	1	34	—	—	—	—	—
1987–88	Vancouver Canucks	NHL	49	2	3	5	73	—	—	—	—	—
1988–89	Vancouver Canucks	NHL	74	3	11	14	82	4	0	0	0	2
1989–90	Vancouver Canucks	NHL	67	0	2	2	91	—	—	—	—	—
NHL totals			432	11	63	74	686	66	2	9	11	127

=== International ===
Year	Team	Event	GP	G	A	Pts	PIM
1979	Canada	WJC	5	1	1	2	2
Junior totals			5	1	1	2	2

== Awards ==
=== NHL ===
Award	Year(s)
Stanley Cup	1985

=== WHL and CHL ===
Award	Year
Memorial Cup	1978
President's Cup	1978
