= Lindsay Carson =

Canadian ice hockey player

- Born: November 21, 1960 (age 65) Oxbow, Saskatchewan, Canada
- Height: 6 ft 2 in (188 cm)
- Weight: 195 lb (88 kg; 13 st 13 lb)
- Position: Center
- Shot: Left
- Played for: Philadelphia Flyers; Hartford Whalers
- NHL draft: 56th overall, 1979; Philadelphia Flyers
- Playing career: 1980–1989

Lindsay Warren Carson (born November 21, 1960) is a Canadian former professional ice hockey centre who played seven seasons in the National Hockey League (NHL) with the Philadelphia Flyers and Hartford Whalers. Carson was born in Oxbow, Saskatchewan, but grew up in North Battleford, Saskatchewan.

== Playing career ==
Carson started his NHL career with the Philadelphia Flyers in 1981. He also played for the Hartford Whalers. He left the NHL after the 1988 season. He played one more season in the AHL before retiring from hockey.

== Career statistics ==
=== Regular season and playoffs ===
			Regular season					Playoffs
Season	Team	League	GP	G	A	Pts	PIM	GP	G	A	Pts	PIM
1976–77	Battleford Barons	SJHL	59	31	39	70	111	—	—	—	—	—
1977–78	Saskatoon Blades	WCHL	62	23	55	78	124	—	—	—	—	—
1978–79	Saskatoon Blades	WHL	37	21	29	50	55	—	—	—	—	—
1978–79	Billings Bighorns	WHL	30	13	22	35	50	8	4	7	11	2
1979–80	Billings Bighorns	WHL	70	42	66	108	101	7	4	5	9	14
1980–81	Saginaw Gears	IHL	79	11	25	36	84	20	4	12	16	45
1981–82	Philadelphia Flyers	NHL	18	0	1	1	32	—	—	—	—	—
1981–82	Maine Mariners	AHL	54	20	31	51	92	4	0	0	0	12
1982–83	Philadelphia Flyers	NHL	78	18	19	37	67	1	0	0	0	0
1983–84	Springfield Indians	AHL	5	2	4	6	5	—	—	—	—	—
1983–84	Philadelphia Flyers	NHL	16	1	3	4	10	1	0	0	0	5
1984–85	Philadelphia Flyers	NHL	77	20	19	39	123	17	0	3	3	24
1985–86	Philadelphia Flyers	NHL	50	9	12	21	84	1	0	0	0	5
1986–87	Philadelphia Flyers	NHL	71	11	15	26	141	24	3	5	8	22
1987–88	Philadelphia Flyers	NHL	36	2	7	9	37	—	—	—	—	—
1987–88	Hartford Whalers	NHL	27	5	4	9	30	5	1	2	3	0
1988–89	Binghamton Whalers	AHL	24	4	10	14	35	—	—	—	—	—
NHL totals			373	66	80	146	524	49	4	10	14	56

== Personal life ==
Carson likes to go hunting and fishing. Some of his favorite places have included North Glaslyn, Saskatchewan, Jasper National Park, Billings, Montana, and Portland, Maine.
