= Doug Crossman =

Canadian ice hockey player

- Born: June 13, 1960 (age 65) Peterborough, Ontario, Canada
- Height: 6 ft 2 in (188 cm)
- Weight: 190 lb (86 kg; 13 st 8 lb)
- Position: Defence
- Shot: Left
- Played for: Chicago Black Hawks; Philadelphia Flyers; Los Angeles Kings; New York Islanders; Hartford Whalers; Detroit Red Wings; Tampa Bay Lightning; St. Louis Blues
- National team: Canada
- NHL draft: 112th overall, 1979; Chicago Black Hawks
- Playing career: 1980–1996

Douglas A. Crossman (born June 13, 1960) is a Canadian former professional ice hockey defenceman who played 14 seasons in the National Hockey League (NHL). Crossman was born in Peterborough, Ontario.

== Playing career ==
Drafted in the sixth round of the 1979 NHL entry draft from the Ottawa 67's, Crossman played 914 NHL games for the Chicago Black Hawks, Philadelphia Flyers, Los Angeles Kings, New York Islanders, Hartford Whalers, Detroit Red Wings, Tampa Bay Lightning and St. Louis Blues. He had been also traded to the Quebec Nordiques on June 15, 1992, by the Red Wings with Dennis Vial for cash and then was selected by the Lightning on June 18 in the expansion draft, so he never played a game with the Nordiques. He won the Turner Cup with the Denver Grizzlies in 1995. He retired in 1996.

He was a member of the 1987 Canada Cup Canadian National team.

== Career statistics ==
=== Regular season and playoffs ===
			Regular season					Playoffs
Season	Team	League	GP	G	A	Pts	PIM	GP	G	A	Pts	PIM
1976–77	Strathroy Blades	WOHL	39	6	35	41	56	—	—	—	—	—
1976–77	London Knights	OMJHL	1	0	0	0	0	—	—	—	—	—
1977–78	Ottawa 67's	OMJHL	65	4	17	21	17	16	2	11	13	10
1978–79	Ottawa 67's	OMJHL	67	12	51	63	65	4	1	3	4	0
1979–80	Ottawa 67's	OMJHL	66	20	96	116	48	11	7	6	13	19
1980–81	Chicago Black Hawks	NHL	9	0	2	2	2	—	—	—	—	—
1980–81	New Brunswick Hawks	AHL	70	13	43	56	90	13	5	6	11	36
1981–82	Chicago Black Hawks	NHL	70	12	28	40	24	11	0	3	3	4
1982–83	Chicago Black Hawks	NHL	80	13	40	53	46	13	3	7	10	6
1983–84	Philadelphia Flyers	NHL	78	7	28	35	63	3	0	0	0	0
1984–85	Philadelphia Flyers	NHL	80	4	33	37	65	19	4	6	10	38
1985–86	Philadelphia Flyers	NHL	80	6	37	43	55	5	0	1	1	4
1986–87	Philadelphia Flyers	NHL	78	9	31	40	29	26	4	14	18	31
1987–88	Philadelphia Flyers	NHL	76	9	29	38	43	7	1	1	2	8
1988–89	New Haven Nighthawks	AHL	3	0	0	0	0	—	—	—	—	—
1988–89	Los Angeles Kings	NHL	74	10	15	25	53	2	0	1	1	2
1989–90	New York Islanders	NHL	80	15	44	59	54	5	0	1	1	6
1990–91	New York Islanders	NHL	16	1	6	7	12	—	—	—	—	—
1990–91	Hartford Whalers	NHL	41	4	19	23	19	—	—	—	—	—
1990–91	Detroit Red Wings	NHL	17	3	4	7	17	6	0	5	5	6
1991–92	Detroit Red Wings	NHL	26	0	8	8	14	—	—	—	—	—
1992–93	Tampa Bay Lightning	NHL	40	8	21	29	18	—	—	—	—	—
1992–93	St. Louis Blues	NHL	19	2	7	9	10	—	—	—	—	—
1993–94	St. Louis Blues	NHL	50	2	7	9	10	—	—	—	—	—
1993–94	Peoria Rivermen	IHL	8	3	5	8	0	—	—	—	—	—
1994–95	Denver Grizzlies	IHL	77	6	43	49	31	17	3	6	9	7
1995–96	Baltimore Bandits	AHL	23	3	12	15	18	—	—	—	—	—
1995–96	Chicago Wolves	IHL	8	1	4	5	2	6	1	1	2	0
NHL totals			914	105	359	464	534	97	12	39	51	105

=== International ===
Year	Team	Event	GP	G	A	Pts	PIM
1980	Canada	WJC	5	0	2	2	2
1987	Canada	CC	8	0	1	1	4
Junior totals			5	0	2	2	2
Senior totals			8	0	1	1	4
