= Dave Hunter =

Canadian ice hockey player (born 1958)

- Born: January 1, 1958 (age 68) Petrolia, Ontario, Canada
- Height: 5 ft 11 in (180 cm)
- Weight: 195 lb (88 kg; 13 st 13 lb)
- Position: Left wing
- Shot: Left
- Played for: Edmonton Oilers; Pittsburgh Penguins; Winnipeg Jets
- NHL draft: 17th overall, 1978; Montreal Canadiens
- Playing career: 1978–1989

David P. Hunter (born January 1, 1958) is a Canadian former professional ice hockey player who won three Stanley Cups with the Edmonton Oilers in the 1980s. He also played for the Pittsburgh Penguins and Winnipeg Jets.

Hunter was born in Petrolia, Ontario, but grew up in nearby (13 km) Oil Springs, Ontario, and was the first of the three Hunter brothers, which also includes fellow NHLers Dale and Mark, to reach the NHL. He was the Montreal Canadiens 2nd first-round pick (17th overall) in the 1978 NHL Amateur Draft from the Sudbury Wolves.

After his NHL career, Hunter has had recognized success as an industry leader in oilfield operations.

== Awards and achievements ==
- 1983–84 - NHL - Stanley Cup (Edmonton)
- 1984–85 - NHL - Stanley Cup (Edmonton)
- 1986–87 - NHL - Stanley Cup (Edmonton)

== Career statistics ==
=== Regular season and playoffs ===
			Regular season					Playoffs
Season	Team	League	GP	G	A	Pts	PIM	GP	G	A	Pts	PIM
1975–76	Sudbury Wolves	OMJHL	53	7	21	28	117	17	0	9	9	53
1976–77	Sudbury Wolves	OMJHL	62	30	56	86	140	6	1	3	4	9
1977–78	Sudbury Wolves	OMJHL	68	44	44	88	156	—	—	—	—	—
1978–79	Dallas Black Hawks	CHL	6	3	4	7	6	—	—	—	—	—
1978–79	Edmonton Oilers	WHA	72	7	25	32	134	13	2	3	5	42
1979–80	Edmonton Oilers	NHL	80	12	31	43	103	3	0	0	0	7
1980–81	Edmonton Oilers	NHL	78	12	16	28	98	9	0	0	0	28
1981–82	Edmonton Oilers	NHL	63	16	22	38	63	5	0	1	1	26
1982–83	Edmonton Oilers	NHL	80	13	18	31	120	16	4	7	11	60
1983–84	Edmonton Oilers	NHL	80	22	26	48	90	17	5	5	10	14
1984–85	Edmonton Oilers	NHL	80	17	19	36	122	18	2	5	7	33
1985–86	Edmonton Oilers	NHL	62	15	22	37	77	10	2	3	5	23
1986–87	Edmonton Oilers	NHL	77	6	9	15	79	21	3	3	6	20
1987–88	Edmonton Oilers	NHL	21	3	3	6	6	—	—	—	—	—
1987–88	Pittsburgh Penguins	NHL	59	11	18	29	77	—	—	—	—	—
1988–89	Winnipeg Jets	NHL	34	3	1	4	61	—	—	—	—	—
1988–89	Edmonton Oilers	NHL	32	3	5	8	22	6	0	0	0	0
WHA totals			72	7	25	32	134	13	2	3	5	42
NHL totals			746	133	190	323	918	105	16	24	40	211

=== International ===
Year	Team	Event	GP	G	A	Pts	PIM
1977	Canada	WJC	7	6	2	8	2

== See also ==
- List of family relations in the National Hockey League

Preceded by Dan Geoffrion	Montreal Canadiens first-round draft pick 1978	Succeeded by Doug Wickenheiser
