= Joe Paterson (ice hockey) =

Canadian ice hockey player (born 1960)

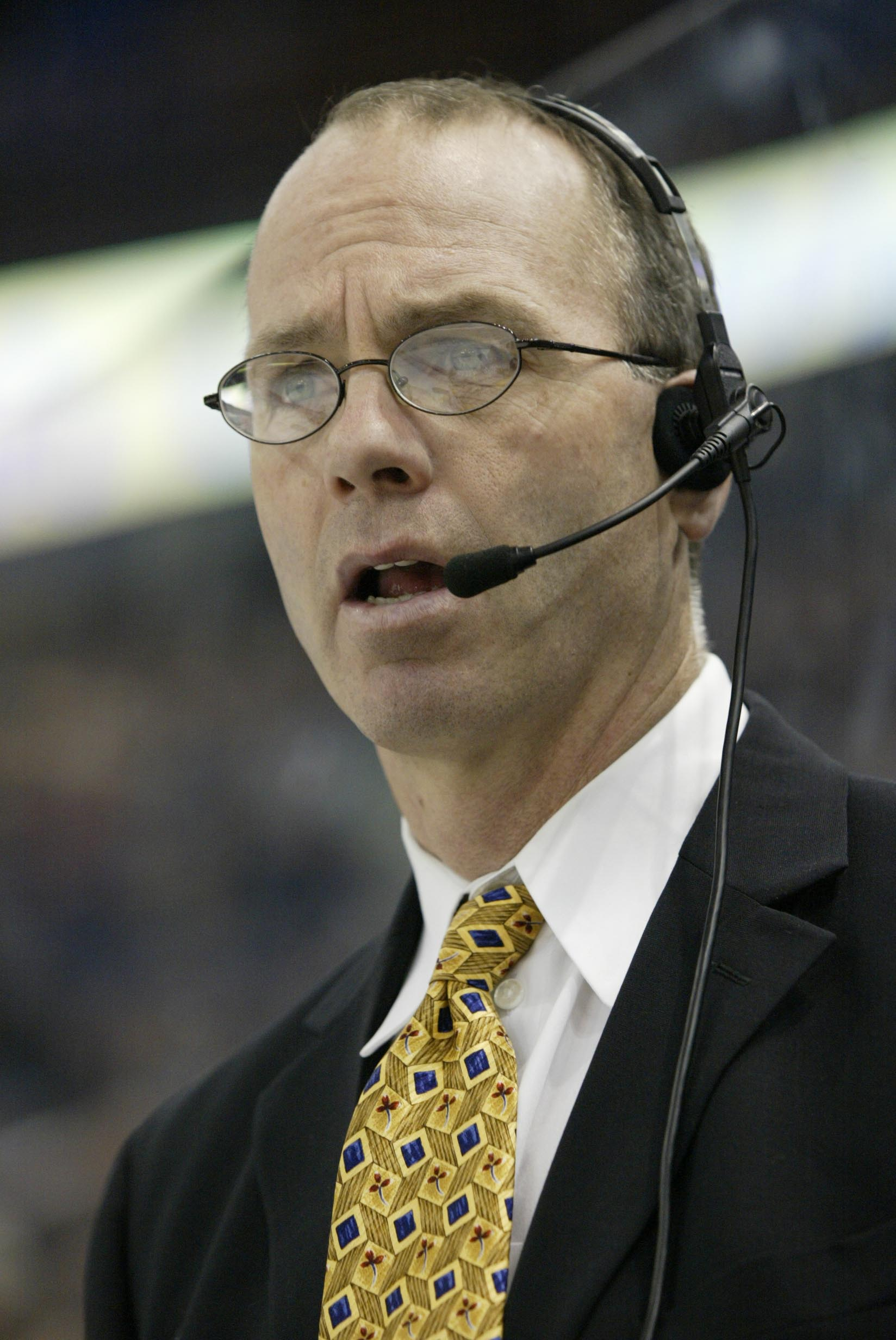
- Born: June 25, 1960 (age 66) Toronto, Ontario, Canada
- Height: 6 ft 2 in (188 cm)
- Weight: 205 lb (93 kg; 14 st 9 lb)
- Position: Left wing
- Shot: Left
- Played for: Detroit Red Wings; Philadelphia Flyers; Los Angeles Kings; New York Rangers
- NHL draft: 87th overall, 1979; Detroit Red Wings
- Playing career: 1980–1992

Joseph Andrew Paterson (born June 25, 1960) is a Canadian former professional ice hockey left winger who played nine seasons in the National Hockey League (NHL).

== Career ==
During his career in the NHL, Paterson played for the Detroit Red Wings, Philadelphia Flyers, Los Angeles Kings and New York Rangers between 1980 and 1989. He later served as the head coach of the Sault Ste. Marie Greyhounds of the Ontario Hockey League, the Louisville Panthers of the American Hockey League (AHL), and the Adirondack Phantoms of the AHL. He was a pro scout with the Kings from 2013 to 2015.

== Career statistics ==
=== Regular season and playoffs ===
| | | | Regular season | | | | | Playoffs |
| Season | Team | League | GP | G | A | Pts | PIM | GP | G | A | Pts | PIM |
|---|---|---|---|---|---|---|---|---|---|---|---|---|
| 1976–77 | Weston Dodgers | OPJHL | 51 | 1 | 3 | 5 | 7 | — | — | — | — | — |
| 1977–78 | London Knights | OMJHL | 68 | 17 | 16 | 33 | 100 | 11 | 3 | 2 | 5 | 36 |
| 1978–79 | London Knights | OMJHL | 59 | 22 | 19 | 41 | 158 | 7 | 2 | 3 | 5 | 13 |
| 1979–80 | London Knights | OMJHL | 62 | 21 | 50 | 71 | 156 | 5 | 4 | 2 | 6 | 4 |
| 1979–80 | Kalamazoo Wings | IHL | 4 | 1 | 2 | 3 | 2 | 3 | 2 | 1 | 3 | 11 |
| 1980–81 | Detroit Red Wings | NHL | 38 | 2 | 5 | 7 | 53 | — | — | — | — | — |
| 1980–81 | Adirondack Red Wings | AHL | 39 | 9 | 16 | 25 | 68 | — | — | — | — | — |
| 1981–82 | Detroit Red Wings | NHL | 3 | 0 | 0 | 0 | 0 | — | — | — | — | — |
| 1981–82 | Adirondack Red Wings | AHL | 74 | 22 | 28 | 50 | 132 | 5 | 1 | 4 | 5 | 6 |
| 1982–83 | Detroit Red Wings | NHL | 33 | 2 | 1 | 3 | 14 | — | — | — | — | — |
| 1982–83 | Adirondack Red Wings | AHL | 36 | 11 | 10 | 21 | 85 | 6 | 1 | 2 | 3 | 21 |
| 1983–84 | Adirondack Red Wings | AHL | 20 | 10 | 15 | 25 | 43 | — | — | — | — | — |
| 1983–84 | Detroit Red Wings | NHL | 41 | 2 | 5 | 7 | 148 | 3 | 0 | 0 | 0 | 7 |
| 1984–85 | Hershey Bears | AHL | 67 | 26 | 27 | 53 | 173 | — | — | — | — | — |
| 1984–85 | Philadelphia Flyers | NHL | 6 | 0 | 0 | 0 | 31 | 17 | 3 | 4 | 7 | 70 |
| 1985–86 | Philadelphia Flyers | NHL | 5 | 0 | 0 | 0 | 12 | — | — | — | — | — |
| 1985–86 | Hershey Bears | AHL | 20 | 5 | 10 | 15 | 68 | — | — | — | — | — |
| 1985–86 | Los Angeles Kings | NHL | 47 | 9 | 18 | 27 | 153 | — | — | — | — | — |
| 1986–87 | Los Angeles Kings | NHL | 45 | 2 | 1 | 3 | 158 | 2 | 0 | 0 | 0 | 0 |
| 1987–88 | Los Angeles Kings | NHL | 32 | 1 | 3 | 4 | 113 | — | — | — | — | — |
| 1987–88 | New York Rangers | NHL | 21 | 1 | 3 | 4 | 65 | — | — | — | — | — |
| 1988–89 | New York Rangers | NHL | 20 | 0 | 1 | 1 | 84 | — | — | — | — | — |
| 1988–89 | Denver Rangers | IHL | 9 | 5 | 4 | 9 | 31 | — | — | — | — | — |
| 1989–90 | Flint Spirits | IHL | 69 | 21 | 26 | 47 | 198 | 4 | 0 | 1 | 1 | 2 |
| 1990–91 | Binghamton Rangers | AHL | 80 | 16 | 35 | 51 | 221 | 10 | 5 | 3 | 8 | 25 |
| 1991–92 | Binghamton Rangers | AHL | 49 | 7 | 10 | 17 | 115 | 5 | 0 | 0 | 0 | 4 |
| 1991–92 | Phoenix Roadrunners | IHL | 2 | 0 | 0 | 0 | 2 | — | — | — | — | — |
| AHL totals | | | 385 | 106 | 151 | 257 | 905 | 26 | 7 | 9 | 16 | 56 |
| NHL totals | | | 291 | 19 | 37 | 56 | 831 | 22 | 3 | 4 | 7 | 77 |
