= Ed Hospodar =

American-Canadian ice hockey player

- Born: February 9, 1959 (age 67) Bowling Green, Ohio, U.S.
- Height: 6 ft 2 in (188 cm)
- Weight: 210 lb (95 kg; 15 st 0 lb)
- Position: Defence
- Shot: Right
- Played for: New York Rangers; Hartford Whalers; Philadelphia Flyers; Minnesota North Stars; Buffalo Sabres
- National team: United States
- NHL draft: 34th overall, 1979; New York Rangers
- Playing career: 1979–1988

Edward David Hospodar (born February 9, 1959) is an American former professional ice hockey defenseman who played nine seasons in the National Hockey League (NHL) for the New York Rangers, Hartford Whalers, Philadelphia Flyers, Minnesota North Stars and Buffalo Sabres. Hospodar did not see a great deal of ice time at any point in his career, and was used primarily as an enforcer.

He was best known for being one of the instigators of a pregame brawl between the Montreal Canadiens and the Philadelphia Flyers in the Montreal Forum prior to game six of the Wales Conference finals on May 14, 1987, an act which earned him a suspension for the remainder of that year's playoffs.

While with the Rangers, Hospodar's face was badly damaged by Clark Gillies of the New York Islanders in a 1981 fight at Madison Square Garden. In 450 NHL games, Hospodar scored 17 goals and had 51 assists, with four goals and one assist during 44 playoff games. He acquired 1314 penalty minutes during his regular season games, and 208 penalty minutes during his playoff games. Hospodar retired from hockey in 1988.

As a youth, Hospodar played in the 1972 Quebec International Pee-Wee Hockey Tournament with a minor ice hockey team from Toronto.

Hospodar received his nickname in junior hockey after a writer deemed the force of his checks to be commensurate with that of a "runaway boxcar". Although born in the United States, Hospodar learned the game in Canada; his father was a plant manager for the Campbell's Soup Company, overseeing plants in New Jersey, Ohio, and later Ontario. Hospodar's brother became a Byzantine Catholic priest.

== Career statistics ==
			Regular season					Playoffs
Season	Team	League	GP	G	A	Pts	PIM	GP	G	A	Pts	PIM
1976–77	Ottawa 67's	OMJHL	51	3	19	22	140	19	3	9	12	113
1977–78	Ottawa 67's	OMJHL	62	7	26	33	172	16	3	6	9	78
1978–79	Ottawa 67's	OMJHL	45	7	16	23	131	5	0	1	1	39
1979–80	New York Rangers	NHL	20	0	1	1	76	7	1	0	1	42
1979–80	New Haven Nighthawks	AHL	25	3	9	12	131	5	0	1	1	39
1980–81	New York Rangers	NHL	61	5	14	19	214	12	2	0	2	93
1981–82	New York Rangers	NHL	41	3	8	11	152	—	—	—	—	—
1982–83	Hartford Whalers	NHL	72	1	9	10	199	—	—	—	—	—
1983–84	Hartford Whalers	NHL	59	0	9	9	163	—	—	—	—	—
1984–85	Philadelphia Flyers	NHL	50	3	4	7	130	18	1	1	2	69
1985–86	Philadelphia Flyers	NHL	17	3	1	4	55	—	—	—	—	—
1985–86	Minnesota North Stars	NHL	43	0	2	2	91	2	0	0	0	2
1986–87	Philadelphia Flyers	NHL	45	2	2	4	136	5	0	0	0	2
1987–88	Buffalo Sabres	NHL	42	0	1	1	98	—	—	—	—	—
1988–89	Rochester Americans	AHL	5	0	0	0	10	—	—	—	—	—
NHL totals			450	17	51	68	1,314	44	4	1	5	208
