= 1984–85 Los Angeles Kings season =

LA Kings 18th NHL season

1984–85 Los Angeles Kings
- Division: 4th Smythe
- Conference: 6th Campbell
- 1984–85 record: 34–32–14
- Home record: 20–14–6
- Road record: 14–18–8
- Goals for: 339
- Goals against: 326

Team information
- General manager: Rogie Vachon
- Coach: Pat Quinn
- Captain: Terry Ruskowski
- Alternate captains: None
- Arena: The Forum
- Average attendance: 486,624

Team leaders
- Goals: Marcel Dionne and Bernie Nicholls (46)
- Assists: Marcel Dionne (80)
- Points: Marcel Dionne (126)
- Penalty minutes: Jay Wells (185)
- Plus/minus: Dave Taylor (+13)
- Wins: Bob Janecyk (22)
- Goals against average: Bob Janecyk (3.66)

The 1984–85 Los Angeles Kings season, was the Kings' 18th season in the National Hockey League (NHL). Following a fifth-place finish the previous season under three different coaches, Pat Quinn was hired as the new head coach of the Kings. In his first season, he returned them to the playoffs after a three-year absence with a 23-point improvement in the standings. But despite the goal scoring brilliance of Marcel Dionne and Bernie Nicholls, the Kings could not duplicate their Miracle on Manchester performance this time, losing to the Edmonton Oilers in three straight games in the Smythe Division semi-finals.

== Offseason ==
=== Transactions ===
- June 9, 1984 – Acquired Bob Janecyk, a first-round choice in the 1984 NHL entry draft (Craig Redmond), a third-round choice in the 1984 NHL Entry Draft (John English) and a fourth-round choice in the 1984 NHL Entry Draft (Tom Glavine) from Chicago for a first-round choice in the 1984 NHL Entry Draft and a fourth-round choice in the 1984 NHL Entry Draft.

=== NHL draft ===
- This draft would the first for Rogie Vachon as the team's general manager. It would be memorable in Kings history for hits as well as misses. On the down side, the team's first round selection, Craig Redmond, didn't amount to much, and they used their fourth round draft pick on Tom Glavine, who opted instead to play professional baseball with the Atlanta Braves. But on the plus side, Vachon struck gold in the 9th round with the 171st pick overall by choosing future Hockey Hall of Fame member Luc Robitaille.

== Regular season ==
=== Season standings ===
Smythe Division
	GP	W	L	T	GF	GA	Pts
**Edmonton Oilers**	80	49	20	11	401	298	109
**Winnipeg Jets**	80	43	27	10	358	332	96
**Calgary Flames**	80	41	27	12	363	302	94
**Los Angeles Kings**	80	34	32	14	339	326	82
Vancouver Canucks	80	25	46	9	284	401	59

Note: GP = Games played, W = Wins, L = Losses, T = Ties, Pts = Points, GF = Goals for, GA = Goals against
Note: Teams that qualified for the playoffs are highlighted in bold.

=== Record vs. opponents ===
Smythe Division record vs. opponents

==== Vs. Campbell Conference ====
**Vs. Smythe Division**

1984–85 NHL records
Team	**CGY**	**EDM**	**LAK**	**VAN**	**WIN**	**Total**
Calgary	—	1−6−1	4−3−1	7−0−1	5−1−2	**17−10−5**
Edmonton	6−1−1	—	4−3−1	3−3−2	5−3	**18−10−4**
Los Angeles	3−4−1	3−4−1	—	4−2−2	2−4−2	**12−14−6**
Vancouver	0−7−1	3−3−2	2−4−2	—	2−5−1	**7−19−6**
Winnipeg	1−5−2	3−5	4−2−2	5−2−1	—	**13−14−5**

**Vs. Norris Division**

1984–85 NHL records
Team	**CHI**	**DET**	**MIN**	**STL**	**TOR**	**Total**
Calgary	1−2	2−1	1−0−2	0−3	3−0	**7−6−2**
Edmonton	3−0	3−0	3−0	3−0	2−0−1	**14−0−1**
Los Angeles	0−2−1	2−1	1−1−1	1−2	2−1	**6−7−2**
Vancouver	1−2	1−2	1−1−1	0−3	1−1−1	**4−9−2**
Winnipeg	1−1−1	2−0−1	2−1	0−1−2	3−0	**8−3−4**

**Vs. Wales Conference**

**Vs. Adams Division**

1984–85 NHL records
Team	**BOS**	**BUF**	**HFD**	**MTL**	**QUE**	**Total**
Calgary	3−0	0−3	3−0	2−0−1	1−1−1	**9−4−2**
Edmonton	2−1	2−0−1	2−1	1−2	3−0	**10−4−1**
Los Angeles	0−1−2	2−0−1	2−0−1	0−2−1	1−2	**5−5−5**
Vancouver	1−2	2−0−1	2−1	2−1	1−2	**8−6−1**
Winnipeg	2−1	2−1	2−1	1−2	2−1	**9−6−0**

**Vs. Patrick Division**

1984–85 NHL records
Team	**NJD**	**NYI**	**NYR**	**PHI**	**PIT**	**WSH**	**Total**
Calgary	2−0−1	2−1	2−0−1	1−2	0−2−1	1−2	**8−7−3**
Edmonton	2−1	2−0−1	1−1−1	0−3	1−1−1	1−0−2	**7−6−5**
Los Angeles	3−0	1−2	2−1	1−1−1	3−0	1−2	**11−6−1**
Vancouver	3−0	1−2	1−2	0−3	1−2	0−3	**6−12−0**
Winnipeg	2−0−1	1−2	3−0	3−0	2−1	2−1	**13−4−1**

== Schedule and results ==
1984–85 regular season
October

Game	Date	Opponent	Score	Location/attendance	Record
1	11	Edmonton Oilers	2–2	Los Angeles	0–0–1
2	13	Vancouver Canucks	5–6 (OT)	Los Angeles	0–1–1
3	14	St. Louis Blues	2–5	Los Angeles	0–2–1
4	16	Washington Capitals	3–5	Washington	0–3–1
5	18	Montreal Canadiens	3–3	Montreal	0–3–2
6	20	New York Islanders	3–8	Uniondale	0–4–2
7	21	Chicago Black Hawks	2–5	Chicago	0–5–2
8	26	Edmonton Oilers	2–8	Edmonton	0–6–2
9	27	Winnipeg Jets	2–2	Winnipeg	0–6–3
10	29	Winnipeg Jets	5–3	Winnipeg	1–6–3
11	31	Vancouver Canucks	10–3	Vancouver	2–6–3

November

Game	Date	Opponent	Score	Location/attendance	Record
12	3	Toronto Maple Leafs	7–0	Los Angeles	3–6–3
13	5	Chicago Black Hawks	2–3	Los Angeles	3–7–3
14	9	Buffalo Sabres	3–2	Los Angeles	4–7–3
15	11	New York Rangers	4–2	New York	5–7–3
16	13	Quebec Nordiques	5–4 (OT)	Quebec City	6–7–3
17	14	Toronto Maple Leafs	4–3	Toronto	7–7–3
18	17	Pittsburgh Penguins	5–3	Los Angeles	8–7–3
19	19	Calgary Flames	5–4	Los Angeles	9–7–3
20	21	New Jersey Devils	8–1	Los Angeles	10-7–3
21	24	Winnipeg Jets	5–9	Los Angeles	10–8–3
22	27	Winnipeg Jets	3–5	Los Angeles	10–9–3
23	29	Vancouver Canucks	12–1	Los Angeles	11–9–3

December

Game	Date	Opponent	Score	Location/attendance	Record
24	1	Vancouver Canucks	6–3	Los Angeles	12–9–3
25	4	Minnesota North Stars	2–2	Minnesota	12–9–4
26	5	Chicago Black Hawks	5–5	Chicago	12–9–5
27	8	Montreal Canadiens	7–9	Montreal	12–10-5
28	10	New York Rangers	2–4	New York	12–11–5
29	13	Edmonton Oilers	7–2	Los Angeles	13–11–5
30	15	Calgary Flames	6–5	Los Angeles	14–11–5
31	18	Calgary Flames	6–3	Calgary	15–11–5
32	19	Edmonton Oilers	3–7	Edmonton	15–12–5
33	22	Winnipeg Jets	2–6	Winnipeg	15–13–5
34	23	Winnipeg Jets	4–4	Winnipeg	15–13–6
35	26	Vancouver Canucks	3–3	Vancouver	15–13–7
36	27	Boston Bruins	6–6	Los Angeles	15–13–8
37	30	Philadelphia Flyers	2–3	Los Angeles	15–14–8

January

Game	Date	Opponent	Score	Location/attendance	Record
38	3	Minnesota North Stars	3–8	Los Angeles	15–15–8
39	5	Detroit Red Wings	5–3	Detroit	16–15–8
40	7	Boston Bruins	4–5 (OT)	Boston	16–16–8
41	9	Calgary Flames	4–4	Calgary	16–16–9
42	12	Winnipeg Jets	6–4	Los Angeles	17–16–9
43	13	Winnipeg Jets	5–6	Los Angeles	17–17–9
44	16	Toronto Maple Leafs	3–4	Los Angeles	17–18–9
45	19	New York Islanders	6–5 (OT)	Los Angeles	18–18–9
46	21	Edmonton Oilers	7–8	Edmonton	18–19–9
47	23	Philadelphia Flyers	6–3	Los Angeles	19–19–9
48	25	St. Louis Blues	3–6	St. Louis	19–20-9
49	26	St. Louis Blues	7–3	St. Louis	20-20–9
50	29	New Jersey Devils	6–3	Los Angeles	21–20–9
51	31	Hartford Whalers	5–3	Los Angeles	22–20–9

February

Game	Date	Opponent	Score	Location/attendance	Record
52	2	Montreal Canadiens	1–5	Los Angeles	22–21–9
53	5	New York Rangers	7–5	Los Angeles	23–21–9
54	7	Philadelphia Flyers	4–4	Philadelphia	23–21–10
55	8	Washington Capitals	1–6	Washington	23–22–10
56	10	Pittsburgh Penguins	4–3	Pittsburgh	24–22–10
57	14	Boston Bruins	3–3	Los Angeles	24–22–11
58	16	Washington Capitals	5–2	Los Angeles	25–22–11
59	19	Quebec Nordiques	6–7	Quebec City	25–23–11
60	21	New Jersey Devils	5–3	New Jersey	26–23–11
61	23	Hartford Whalers	2–1 (OT)	Hartford	27–23–11
62	24	Buffalo Sabres	4–2	Buffalo	28–23–11
63	27	Quebec Nordiques	2–5	Los Angeles	28–24–11

March

Game	Date	Opponent	Score	Location/attendance	Record
64	1	Edmonton Oilers	5–4	Edmonton	29–24–11
65	3	Calgary Flames	0–7	Calgary	29–25–11
66	5	Pittsburgh Penguins	6–0	Los Angeles	30-25–11
67	8	Vancouver Canucks	3–4	Vancouver	30–26–11
68	10	Buffalo Sabres	4–4	Los Angeles	30–26–12
69	13	Hartford Whalers	3–3	Los Angeles	30–26–13
70	16	Detroit Red Wings	8–3	Los Angeles	31–26–13
71	17	Edmonton Oilers	5–4	Los Angeles	32–26–13
72	19	New York Islanders	2–3	Uniondale	32–27–13
73	20	Detroit Red Wings	6–8	Detroit	32–28–13
74	23	Calgary Flames	3–4	Los Angeles	32–29–13
75	27	Calgary Flames	2–4	Los Angeles	32–30-13
76	29	Calgary Flames	0–3	Calgary	32–31–13
77	30	Minnesota North Stars	3–2	Los Angeles	33–31–13

April

Game	Date	Opponent	Score	Location/attendance	Record
78	2	Edmonton Oilers	4–6	Los Angeles	33–32–13
79	5	Vancouver Canucks	4–3	Vancouver	34–32–13
80	6	Vancouver Canucks	4–4	Los Angeles	34–32–14

Legend: Win (2 points) Loss (0 points) Tie (1 point)

== Playoffs ==
=== 1985 Smythe Division Semi-finals ===
Edmonton Oilers vs. Los Angeles Kings

Date	Away	Score	Home	Score	Notes
April 10	Los Angeles	2	Edmonton	3	(OT)
April 11	Los Angeles	2	Edmonton	4	
April 13	Edmonton	4	Los Angeles	3	(OT)

Edmonton wins best-of-five series 3–0.

== Player statistics ==
Regular season
Scoring

Player	Pos	GP	G	A	Pts	PIM	+/-	PPG	SHG	GWG
Marcel Dionne	C	80	46	80	126	46	11	16	1	2
Bernie Nicholls	C	80	46	54	100	76	-4	15	0	6
Dave Taylor	RW	79	41	51	92	132	13	11	2	6
Brian MacLellan	LW	80	31	54	85	53	2	14	0	3
Jim Fox	RW	79	30	53	83	10	4	6	0	2
Mark Hardy	D	78	14	39	53	97	-20	8	1	2
Terry Ruskowski	C	78	16	33	49	144	2	2	0	2
Doug Smith	C	62	21	20	41	58	-15	3	1	1
Steve Shutt	LW	59	16	25	41	10	-16	5	0	1
Craig Redmond	D	79	6	33	39	57	-8	1	0	0
Garry Galley	D	78	8	30	38	82	3	1	1	2
Phil Sykes	LW	79	17	15	32	38	-18	1	2	2
Anders Hakansson	LW	73	12	12	24	28	-4	1	1	1
Brian Engblom	D	79	4	19	23	70	-2	3	0	0
Bob Miller	C	63	4	16	20	35	-17	0	0	0
John Paul Kelly	LW	73	8	10	18	55	-9	0	0	2
Rick Lapointe	D	73	4	13	17	46	-10	0	0	1
Carl Mokosak	LW	30	4	8	12	43	-8	0	0	0
Jay Wells	D	77	2	9	11	185	4	0	0	0
Tiger Williams	LW	12	4	3	7	43	0	0	0	0
Russ Anderson	D	14	1	1	2	20	-2	0	0	0
Bob Janecyk	G	51	0	2	2	27	0	0	0	0
Daryl Evans	LW	7	1	0	1	2	2	0	0	0
Ken Hammond	D	3	1	0	1	0	2	0	0	1
Bill O'Dwyer	C	13	1	0	1	15	0	0	0	0
Charlie Simmer	LW	5	1	0	1	4	-4	0	0	0
Darren Eliot	G	33	0	0	0	0	0	0	0	0
Steve Seguin	W	5	0	0	0	9	-5	0	0	0
Brian Wilks	C	2	0	0	0	0	-1	0	0	0

Goaltending

Player	MIN	GP	W	L	T	GA	GAA	SO
Bob Janecyk	3002	51	22	21	8	183	3.66	2
Darren Eliot	1882	33	12	11	6	137	4.37	0
Team:	4884	80	34	32	14	320	3.93	2

Playoffs
Scoring

Player	Pos	GP	G	A	Pts	PIM	+/-	PPG	SHG	GWG
Dave Taylor	RW	3	2	2	4	8	0	0	0	0
Marcel Dionne	C	3	1	2	3	2	-1	1	0	0
Bernie Nicholls	C	3	1	1	2	9	-2	0	0	0
Terry Ruskowski	C	3	0	2	2	0	-1	0	0	0
Garry Galley	D	3	1	0	1	2	0	0	0	0
Craig Redmond	D	3	1	0	1	2	-4	0	0	0
Doug Smith	C	3	1	0	1	4	-2	0	0	0
Jim Fox	RW	3	0	1	1	0	3	0	0	0
Mark Hardy	D	3	0	1	1	2	-2	0	0	0
Brian MacLellan	LW	3	0	1	1	0	0	0	0	0
Bob Miller	C	2	0	1	1	0	1	0	0	0
Phil Sykes	LW	3	0	1	1	4	-2	0	0	0
Jay Wells	D	3	0	1	1	0	0	0	0	0
Brian Engblom	D	3	0	0	0	2	-4	0	0	0
Anders Hakansson	LW	3	0	0	0	0	0	0	0	0
Ken Hammond	D	3	0	0	0	4	1	0	0	0
Bob Janecyk	G	3	0	0	0	0	0	0	0	0
John Paul Kelly	LW	1	0	0	0	0	0	0	0	0
Steve Shutt	LW	3	0	0	0	4	-4	0	0	0
Tiger Williams	LW	3	0	0	0	4	1	0	0	0

Goaltending

Player	MIN	GP	W	L	GA	GAA	SO
Bob Janecyk	184	3	0	3	10	3.26	0
Team:	184	3	0	3	10	3.26	0

Note:

Pos = Position;GP = Games played; G = Goals; A = Assists; Pts = Points; PIM = Penalty minutes; +/- = Plus/minus; PPG = Power-play goals; SHG = Short-handed goals; GWG = Game-winning goals
Pos = Position;GP = Games played; Min, TOI = Minutes played; W = Wins; L = Losses; T,T/OT = Ties; OTL = Overtime losses; GA = Goals-against; GAA = Goals-against average; SO = Shutouts; SA = Shots against; SV = Shots saved;SV% = Save percentage;

== Awards and records ==
=== Records ===
==== Individual ====
- Most goals in a game, 4 (tied with many others): Bernie Nicholls, November 13, 1984, at Quebec

==== Team ====
- Most 30+ goal scorers in one season, 5: Marcel Dionne, Bernie Nicholls, Dave Taylor, Brian MacLellan, and Jim Fox
- Most 40+ goal scorers in one season, 3 (tied with 1980–81 Kings): Marcel Dionne (46), Bernie Nicholls (46), and Dave Taylor (41)
- Greatest margin of victory at home: 11: November 29, 1984, vs. Vancouver, 12–1
- Greatest margin of victory on the road: 7: October 21, 1984, at Vancouver, 10–3

== Transactions ==
The Kings were involved in the following transactions during the 1984–85 season.

=== Trades ===
June 9, 1984	To Los Angeles Kings Bob Janecyk; 1st round pick in 1984 – Craig Redmond; 3rd round pick in 1984 – John English; 4th round pick in 1984 – Tom Glavine	To Chicago Black Hawks 1st round pick in 1984 – Ed Olczyk; 4th round pick in 1984 – Tommy Eriksson
October 20, 1984	To Los Angeles Kings 1st round pick in 1985 – Dan Gratton	To Boston Bruins Charlie Simmer
November 18, 1984	To Los Angeles Kings Steve Shutt	To Montreal Canadiens 10th round pick in 1985 – Maurice Mansi
November 27, 1984	To Los Angeles Kings Cash	To Edmonton Oilers Dean Hopkins
March 12, 1985	To Los Angeles Kings Tiger Williams	To Detroit Red Wings Future considerations

=== Free agent signings ===
October 1, 1984	From Drummondville Voltigeurs (QMJHL) Steve Duchesne
October 9, 1984	From Kärpät (SM-liiga) Bob Miller
October 10, 1984	From Quebec Nordiques Rick Lapointe
November 8, 1984	From Hartford Whalers Stuart Smith
April 1, 1985	From RPI (NCAA) Ken Hammond

=== Free agents lost ===
July 11, 1984	To Washington Capitals Marc Chorney
August 24, 1984	To St. Louis Blues Kevin LaVallee
October 4, 1984	To Philadelphia Flyers Don Nachbaur
October 10, 1984	To Boston Bruins Dean Jenkins
February 21, 1985	To Edmonton Oilers Marco Baron

== Draft picks ==
Round #	Pick #	Player	Position	Nationality	College/junior/club team
1	6	Craig Redmond	Defence	Canada	University of Denver (WCHA)
2	24	Brian Wilks	Centre	Canada	Kitchener Rangers (OHL)
3	48	John English	Defence	Canada	Sault Ste. Marie Greyhounds (OHL)
4	69	Tom Glavine	Centre	United States	Billerica High School (Massachusetts)
5	87	David Grannis	Left wing	United States	South St. Paul High School (Minnesota)
6	108	Greg Strome	Goaltender	Canada	University of North Dakota (WCHA)
7	129	Timothy Hanley	Centre	United States	Deerfield Academy (Massachusetts)
8	150	Shannon Deegan	Centre	Canada	University of Vermont (ECAC)
9	171	Luc Robitaille	Left wing	Canada	Hull Olympiques (QMJHL)
10	191	Jeff Crossman	Centre	Canada	Western Michigan University (CCHA)
11	212	Paul Kenny	Goaltender	Canada	Cornwall Royals (OHL)
12	232	Brian Martin	Left wing	Canada	Belleville Bulls (OHL)
