= 1984–85 Vancouver Canucks season =

15th season in franchise history

1984–85 Vancouver Canucks
- Division: 5th Smythe
- Conference: 9th Campbell
- 1984–85 record: 25–46–9
- Home record: 15–21–4
- Road record: 10–25–5
- Goals for: 284
- Goals against: 401

Team information
- General manager: Harry Neale
- Coach: Bill LaForge (4-14-2); Harry Neale (21-32-7)
- Captain: Stan Smyl
- Alternate captains: Doug Halward; Rick Lanz
- Arena: Pacific Coliseum
- Average attendance: 11,147

Team leaders
- Goals: Tony Tanti (39)
- Assists: Patrik Sundstrom (43)
- Points: Patrik Sundstrom (68)
- Penalty minutes: Garth Butcher (152)
- Wins: Richard Brodeur (16)
- Goals against average: Richard Brodeur (4.67)

The 1984–85 Vancouver Canucks season was the team's 15th in the National Hockey League (NHL). The Canucks did not qualify for the playoffs for the first time since the 1977–78 season.

== Offseason ==
On May 18, Bill LaForge was announced as the new head coach. At 32 years of age, LaForge would be the youngest coach in the NHL at the time. LaForge signed a two-year contract and promised tough practices, while emphasizing his PhD philosophy – pride, hustle, and desire.

Having played the majority of the previous season with the team's minor-league affiliate, centre Gerry Minor was not offered a new contract. On May 30, the team announced it had signed its first Finnish player, Petri Skriko. The 8th round selection in the 1981 Draft had most recently been a member of SaiPa in the Finnish Elite League. After three seasons with the club, Lars Molin turned down a two-way contract and returned to his native Sweden to play with his former club, MoDo AIK.

In the entry draft, the Canucks took 5'11" defenceman J. J. Daigneault with the tenth overall pick. He would have a solid rookie campaign, playing 67 games and collecting 27 points.

On June 22, the club announced that veteran forward Al MacAdam had been acquired from the North Stars for future considerations. The following day, it was revealed that fan favourite Harold Snepsts would be heading to Minnesota after playing his entire ten-year career in a Canucks uniform.

After neck problems had plagued him during the previous season, Darcy Rota underwent spinal fusion surgery on June 29.

Entering the option year of his contract and unable to agree to terms for a new one, enforcer Tiger Williams was dealt to the Detroit Red Wings for Rob McClanahan.

=== Training camp ===
The Canucks held their training camp at the Cowichan Community Centre in Duncan, from September 18–21.

49 players took part in the training camp. Notable absences included Thomas Gradin and Patrik Sundström, who were representing Team Sweden in the Canada Cup tournament, as well as Darcy Rota and Stu Kulak who were both recovering from injuries.

Players were divided into three scrimmage teams, around which the training camp revolved. Aligning closely to coach LaForge's pride, hustle, and desire philosophy, the teams were named accordingly: Team Pride (captained by Ron Delorme); Team Hustle (captained by Doug Halward); Team Desire (captained by Stan Smyl). These scrimmage teams competed in a round-robin tournament, with the winning team claiming the PhD Cup. At the conclusion of each game, all players of the losing team were made to run a mile in full hockey gear. Those with bad knees were permitted to pedal five miles on a stationary bike in full hockey gear.

== Regular season ==
The team continued to travel aboard their private jet, Air Canuck, for all road trips until late in the season when the plane was sold.

=== Final standings ===
Smythe Division
| | GP | W | L | T | GF | GA | Pts |
|---|---|---|---|---|---|---|---|
| **Edmonton Oilers** | 80 | 49 | 20 | 11 | 401 | 298 | 109 |
| **Winnipeg Jets** | 80 | 43 | 27 | 10 | 358 | 332 | 96 |
| **Calgary Flames** | 80 | 41 | 27 | 12 | 363 | 302 | 94 |
| **Los Angeles Kings** | 80 | 34 | 32 | 14 | 339 | 326 | 82 |
| Vancouver Canucks | 80 | 25 | 46 | 9 | 284 | 401 | 59 |

Note: GP = Games played, W = Wins, L = Losses, T = Ties, Pts = Points, GF = Goals for, GA = Goals against
Note: Teams that qualified for the playoffs are highlighted in bold.

=== Record vs. opponents ===
Smythe Division record vs. opponents

==== Vs. Campbell Conference ====
**Vs. Smythe Division**

1984–85 NHL records
| Team | **CGY** | **EDM** | **LAK** | **VAN** | **WIN** | **Total** |
|---|---|---|---|---|---|---|
| Calgary | — | 1−6−1 | 4−3−1 | 7−0−1 | 5−1−2 | **17−10−5** |
| Edmonton | 6−1−1 | — | 4−3−1 | 3−3−2 | 5−3 | **18−10−4** |
| Los Angeles | 3−4−1 | 3−4−1 | — | 4−2−2 | 2−4−2 | **12−14−6** |
| Vancouver | 0−7−1 | 3−3−2 | 2−4−2 | — | 2−5−1 | **7−19−6** |
| Winnipeg | 1−5−2 | 3−5 | 4−2−2 | 5−2−1 | — | **13−14−5** |

**Vs. Norris Division**

1984–85 NHL records
| Team | **CHI** | **DET** | **MIN** | **STL** | **TOR** | **Total** |
|---|---|---|---|---|---|---|
| Calgary | 1−2 | 2−1 | 1−0−2 | 0−3 | 3−0 | **7−6−2** |
| Edmonton | 3−0 | 3−0 | 3−0 | 3−0 | 2−0−1 | **14−0−1** |
| Los Angeles | 0−2−1 | 2−1 | 1−1−1 | 1−2 | 2−1 | **6−7−2** |
| Vancouver | 1−2 | 1−2 | 1−1−1 | 0−3 | 1−1−1 | **4−9−2** |
| Winnipeg | 1−1−1 | 2−0−1 | 2−1 | 0−1−2 | 3−0 | **8−3−4** |

**Vs. Wales Conference**

**Vs. Adams Division**

1984–85 NHL records
| Team | **BOS** | **BUF** | **HFD** | **MTL** | **QUE** | **Total** |
|---|---|---|---|---|---|---|
| Calgary | 3−0 | 0−3 | 3−0 | 2−0−1 | 1−1−1 | **9−4−2** |
| Edmonton | 2−1 | 2−0−1 | 2−1 | 1−2 | 3−0 | **10−4−1** |
| Los Angeles | 0−1−2 | 2−0−1 | 2−0−1 | 0−2−1 | 1−2 | **5−5−5** |
| Vancouver | 1−2 | 2−0−1 | 2−1 | 2−1 | 1−2 | **8−6−1** |
| Winnipeg | 2−1 | 2−1 | 2−1 | 1−2 | 2−1 | **9−6−0** |

**Vs. Patrick Division**

1984–85 NHL records
| Team | **NJD** | **NYI** | **NYR** | **PHI** | **PIT** | **WSH** | **Total** |
|---|---|---|---|---|---|---|---|
| Calgary | 2−0−1 | 2−1 | 2−0−1 | 1−2 | 0−2−1 | 1−2 | **8−7−3** |
| Edmonton | 2−1 | 2−0−1 | 1−1−1 | 0−3 | 1−1−1 | 1−0−2 | **7−6−5** |
| Los Angeles | 3−0 | 1−2 | 2−1 | 1−1−1 | 3−0 | 1−2 | **11−6−1** |
| Vancouver | 3−0 | 1−2 | 1−2 | 0−3 | 1−2 | 0−3 | **6−12−0** |
| Winnipeg | 2−0−1 | 1−2 | 3−0 | 3−0 | 2−1 | 2−1 | **13−4−1** |

== Schedule and results ==
=== Pre-season ===
The Canucks released their pre-season schedule on June 20, 1984.

1984 preseason
Preseason: 4–5–1 (home: 2–3–0; road: 2–2–1)

| Game | Date | Visitor | Score | Home | Decision | Attendance | Record | Recap |
|---|---|---|---|---|---|---|---|---|
| 1^{[a]}^{[b]} | September 22 | Vancouver | 4–1 | Los Angeles | Kilroy | — | – | |
| 2^{[b]} | September 22 | Vancouver | 5–3 | Los Angeles | Young | 3,958 | 1–0–0 | |
| 3^{[a]}^{[c]} | September 23 | Los Angeles | 4–5 | Vancouver | Grant | — | – | |
| 4^{[c]} | September 23 | Los Angeles | 4–3 | Vancouver | Young | — | 1–1–0 | |
| 5 | September 25 | Edmonton | 7–2 | Vancouver | Brodeur | 9,241 | 1–2–0 | |
| 6 | September 28 | Vancouver | 4–3 | Winnipeg | Caprice | 10,820 | 2–2–0 | |
| 7 | September 30 | Vancouver | 4–8 | Calgary | Brodeur | 16,863 | 2–3–0 | |
| 8 | October 2 | Vancouver | 4–7 | Edmonton | Garrett | 17,237 | 2–4–0 | |
| 9^{[b]} | October 3 | Winnipeg | 0–4 | Vancouver | Caprice | 3,900 | 3–4–0 | |
| 10 | October 4 | Vancouver | 5–5 | Los Angeles | Garrett | 5,000 | 3–4–1 | |
| 11 | October 5 | Calgary | 3–4 | Vancouver | Brodeur | 8,997 | 4–4–1 | |
| 12 | October 7 | St. Louis | 5–4 | Vancouver | Caprice | 9,059 | 4–5–1 | |

Legend: Win (2 points) Loss (0 points) Tie (1 point)
Notes:
^{a} Game was played by the rookie squad.
^{b} Game was played at Memorial Arena in Victoria.
^{c} Game was played at Cowichan Community Centre in Duncan.

=== Regular season ===
The Canucks released their regular season schedule on June 27, 1984.

1984–85 regular season
October

| Game | Result | Date | Score | Opponent | Record |
|---|---|---|---|---|---|
| 1 | L | October 11, 1984 | 2–5 | Quebec Nordiques (1984–85) | 0–1–0 |
| 2 | W | October 13, 1984 | 6–5 OT | @ Los Angeles Kings (1984–85) | 1–1–0 |
| 3 | L | October 14, 1984 | 5–7 | Calgary Flames (1984–85) | 1–2–0 |
| 4 | L | October 17, 1984 | 3–4 | @ Pittsburgh Penguins (1984–85) | 1–3–0 |
| 5 | L | October 18, 1984 | 2–13 | @ Philadelphia Flyers (1984–85) | 1–4–0 |
| 6 | L | October 20, 1984 | 2–3 | @ Hartford Whalers (1984–85) | 1–5–0 |
| 7 | L | October 23, 1984 | 5–6 | @ New York Islanders (1984–85) | 1–6–0 |
| 8 | L | October 24, 1984 | 3–9 | @ Chicago Black Hawks (1984–85) | 1–7–0 |
| 9 | L | October 28, 1984 | 2–5 | Washington Capitals (1984–85) | 1–8–0 |
| 10 | L | October 30, 1984 | 0–7 | @ Edmonton Oilers (1984–85) | 1–9–0 |
| 11 | L | October 31, 1984 | 3–10 | Los Angeles Kings (1984–85) | 1–10–0 |

November

| Game | Result | Date | Score | Opponent | Record |
|---|---|---|---|---|---|
| 12 | W | November 3, 1984 | 6–4 | Chicago Black Hawks (1984–85) | 2–10–0 |
| 13 | T | November 7, 1984 | 4–4 OT | @ Toronto Maple Leafs (1984–85) | 2–10–1 |
| 14 | L | November 9, 1984 | 5–7 | @ Winnipeg Jets (1984–85) | 2–11–1 |
| 15 | T | November 10, 1984 | 5–5 OT | @ Minnesota North Stars (1984–85) | 2–11–2 |
| 16 | L | November 12, 1984 | 3–5 | Montreal Canadiens (1984–85) | 2–12–2 |
| 17 | W | November 14, 1984 | 3–2 | Detroit Red Wings (1984–85) | 3–12–2 |
| 18 | W | November 16, 1984 | 7–6 | Pittsburgh Penguins (1984–85) | 4–12–2 |
| 19 | L | November 17, 1984 | 0–7 | @ Edmonton Oilers (1984–85) | 4–13–2 |
| 20 | L | November 20, 1984 | 1–5 | St. Louis Blues (1984–85) | 4–14–2 |
| 21 | L | November 21, 1984 | 4–6 | @ Calgary Flames (1984–85) | 4–15–2 |
| 22 | L | November 23, 1984 | 1–5 | Winnipeg Jets (1984–85) | 4–16–2 |
| 23 | L | November 25, 1984 | 2–4 | Calgary Flames (1984–85) | 4–17–2 |
| 24 | L | November 27, 1984 | 1–6 | St. Louis Blues (1984–85) | 4–18–2 |
| 25 | L | November 29, 1984 | 1–12 | @ Los Angeles Kings (1984–85) | 4–19–2 |

December

| Game | Result | Date | Score | Opponent | Record |
|---|---|---|---|---|---|
| 26 | L | December 1, 1984 | 3–6 | @ Los Angeles Kings (1984–85) | 4–20–2 |
| 27 | L | December 3, 1984 | 4–5 | New York Islanders (1984–85) | 4–21–2 |
| 28 | W | December 8, 1984 | 3–2 OT | Edmonton Oilers (1984–85) | 5–21–2 |
| 29 | W | December 11, 1984 | 4–3 | @ Quebec Nordiques (1984–85) | 6–21–2 |
| 30 | W | December 13, 1984 | 5–4 | @ Montreal Canadiens (1984–85) | 7–21–2 |
| 31 | L | December 15, 1984 | 1–2 OT | @ Boston Bruins (1984–85) | 7–22–2 |
| 32 | T | December 16, 1984 | 2–2 OT | @ Buffalo Sabres (1984–85) | 7–22–3 |
| 33 | L | December 20, 1984 | 1–9 | @ Calgary Flames (1984–85) | 7–23–3 |
| 34 | W | December 21, 1984 | 3–1 | @ Edmonton Oilers (1984–85) | 8–23–3 |
| 35 | L | December 23, 1984 | 4–5 | Calgary Flames (1984–85) | 8–24–3 |
| 36 | T | December 26, 1984 | 3–3 OT | Los Angeles Kings (1984–85) | 8–24–4 |
| 37 | L | December 28, 1984 | 4–7 | Philadelphia Flyers (1984–85) | 8–25–4 |
| 38 | T | December 30, 1984 | 7–7 OT | Edmonton Oilers (1984–85) | 8–25–5 |

January

| Game | Result | Date | Score | Opponent | Record |
|---|---|---|---|---|---|
| 39 | L | January 2, 1985 | 0–6 | @ New York Rangers (1984–85) | 8–26–5 |
| 40 | W | January 3, 1985 | 6–4 | @ New Jersey Devils (1984–85) | 9–26–5 |
| 41 | W | January 5, 1985 | 4–1 | @ Toronto Maple Leafs (1984–85) | 10–26–5 |
| 42 | L | January 8, 1985 | 3–5 | @ Philadelphia Flyers (1984–85) | 10–27–5 |
| 43 | L | January 9, 1985 | 4–7 | @ Pittsburgh Penguins (1984–85) | 10–28–5 |
| 44 | L | January 13, 1985 | 3–5 | Toronto Maple Leafs (1984–85) | 10–29–5 |
| 45 | W | January 15, 1985 | 6–5 OT | New York Islanders (1984–85) | 11–29–5 |
| 46 | T | January 18, 1985 | 4–4 OT | Edmonton Oilers (1984–85) | 11–29–6 |
| 47 | L | January 19, 1985 | 5–7 | @ Edmonton Oilers (1984–85) | 11–30–6 |
| 48 | T | January 21, 1985 | 3–3 OT | Calgary Flames (1984–85) | 11–30–7 |
| 49 | L | January 23, 1985 | 4–6 | Winnipeg Jets (1984–85) | 11–31–7 |
| 50 | W | January 25, 1985 | 7–4 | Winnipeg Jets (1984–85) | 12–31–7 |
| 51 | L | January 26, 1985 | 2–6 | @ Calgary Flames (1984–85) | 12–32–7 |
| 52 | W | January 30, 1985 | 5–4 OT | Montreal Canadiens (1984–85) | 13–32–7 |

February

| Game | Result | Date | Score | Opponent | Record |
|---|---|---|---|---|---|
| 53 | W | February 1, 1985 | 4–3 OT | Hartford Whalers (1984–85) | 14–32–7 |
| 54 | W | February 3, 1985 | 4–1 | New York Rangers (1984–85) | 15–32–7 |
| 55 | L | February 6, 1985 | 0–4 | @ St. Louis Blues (1984–85) | 15–33–7 |
| 56 | T | February 8, 1985 | 5–5 OT | @ Winnipeg Jets (1984–85) | 15–33–8 |
| 57 | W | February 10, 1985 | 5–3 | @ Winnipeg Jets (1984–85) | 16–33–8 |
| 58 | W | February 16, 1985 | 3–2 OT | Boston Bruins (1984–85) | 17–33–8 |
| 59 | W | February 19, 1985 | 7–5 | New Jersey Devils (1984–85) | 18–33–8 |
| 60 | L | February 21, 1985 | 2–6 | Washington Capitals (1984–85) | 18–34–8 |
| 61 | L | February 23, 1985 | 5–7 | Quebec Nordiques (1984–85) | 18–35–8 |
| 62 | L | February 26, 1985 | 2–3 | @ Washington Capitals (1984–85) | 18–36–8 |
| 63 | L | February 27, 1985 | 5–11 | @ Detroit Red Wings (1984–85) | 18–37–8 |

March

| Game | Result | Date | Score | Opponent | Record |
|---|---|---|---|---|---|
| 64 | L | March 2, 1985 | 0–5 | @ Boston Bruins (1984–85) | 18–38–8 |
| 65 | W | March 3, 1985 | 7–6 OT | @ Hartford Whalers (1984–85) | 19–38–8 |
| 66 | L | March 6, 1985 | 3–6 | New York Rangers (1984–85) | 19–39–8 |
| 67 | W | March 8, 1985 | 4–3 | Los Angeles Kings (1984–85) | 20–39–8 |
| 68 | W | March 10, 1985 | 6–3 | Edmonton Oilers (1984–85) | 21–39–8 |
| 69 | W | March 13, 1985 | 6–4 | Buffalo Sabres (1984–85) | 22–39–8 |
| 70 | L | March 15, 1985 | 5–6 | Detroit Red Wings (1984–85) | 22–40–8 |
| 71 | L | March 17, 1985 | 4–6 | Chicago Black Hawks (1984–85) | 22–41–8 |
| 72 | W | March 20, 1985 | 5–4 | @ Buffalo Sabres (1984–85) | 23–41–8 |
| 73 | W | March 21, 1985 | 3–2 | @ New Jersey Devils (1984–85) | 24–41–8 |
| 74 | L | March 23, 1985 | 4–6 | @ Winnipeg Jets (1984–85) | 24–42–8 |
| 75 | L | March 25, 1985 | 3–5 | @ Minnesota North Stars (1984–85) | 24–43–8 |
| 76 | L | March 27, 1985 | 3–5 | Winnipeg Jets (1984–85) | 24–44–8 |
| 77 | W | March 31, 1985 | 3–2 | Minnesota North Stars (1984–85) | 25–44–8 |

April

| Game | Result | Date | Score | Opponent | Record |
|---|---|---|---|---|---|
| 78 | L | April 3, 1985 | 3–5 | @ Calgary Flames (1984–85) | 25–45–8 |
| 79 | L | April 5, 1985 | 3–4 | Los Angeles Kings (1984–85) | 25–46–8 |
| 80 | T | April 6, 1985 | 4–4 OT | @ Los Angeles Kings (1984–85) | 25–46–9 |

Legend: Win (2 points) Loss (0 points) Tie (1 point)

== Draft picks ==
Vancouver's draft picks at the 1984 NHL entry draft held at the Montreal Forum in Montreal.

| Round | # | Player | Nationality | College/Junior/Club team (League) |
|---|---|---|---|---|
| 1 | 10 | J. J. Daigneault | Canada | Longueuil Chevaliers (QMJHL) |
| 2 | 31 | Jeff Rohlicek | United States | Portland Winter Hawks (WHL) |
| 3 | 52 | David Saunders | Canada | St. Lawrence University (ECAC) |
| 3 | 55 | Landis Chaulk | Canada | Calgary Wranglers (WHL) |
| 3 | 58 | Mike Stevens | Canada | Kitchener Rangers (OHL) |
| 4 | 73 | Brian Bertuzzi | Canada | Kamloops Jr. Oilers (WHL) |
| 5 | 94 | Brett MacDonald | Canada | North Bay Centennials (OHL) |
| 6 | 115 | Jeff Korchinski | Canada | Clarkson College (ECAC) |
| 7 | 136 | Blaine Chrest | Canada | Portland Winter Hawks (WHL) |
| 8 | 157 | Jim Agnew | Canada | Brandon Wheat Kings (WHL) |
| 9 | 178 | Rex Grant | Canada | Kamloops Jr. Oilers (WHL) |
| 10 | 198 | Ed Lowney | United States | Boston University (ECAC) |
| 11 | 219 | Doug Clarke | Canada | Colorado College (WCHA) |
| 12 | 239 | Ed Kister | Canada | London Knights (OHL) |

== Farm teams ==
Fredericton Express (AHL)

== See also ==
- 1984–85 NHL season
