= 1984–85 Winnipeg Jets season =

NHL hockey team season

1984–85 Winnipeg Jets
- Division: 2nd Smythe
- Conference: 2nd Campbell
- 1984–85 record: 43–27–10
- Home record: 21–13–6
- Road record: 22–14–4
- Goals for: 358
- Goals against: 332

Team information
- General manager: John Ferguson
- Coach: Barry Long
- Captain: Dale Hawerchuk
- Alternate captains: None
- Arena: Winnipeg Arena

Team leaders
- Goals: Dale Hawerchuk (53)
- Assists: Dale Hawerchuk (77)
- Points: Dale Hawerchuk (130)
- Penalty minutes: Laurie Boschman (180)
- Wins: Brian Hayward (33)
- Goals against average: Brian Hayward (3.83)

The 1984–85 Winnipeg Jets season was the 13th season of the Winnipeg Jets, sixth season in the National Hockey League (NHL). The Jets tied an NHL record for most 30-goal scorers in a season (6) (first accomplished by the Buffalo Sabres in the 1974–75 season, and equaled by the NY Islanders in the 1977–78 season) and placed second in the Smythe Division to qualify for the playoffs. The Jets defeated the Calgary Flames three games to one in the first round, but lost to the defending and eventual Stanley Cup champion Edmonton Oilers in the second round in a four-game sweep.

== Offseason ==
The Jets began the off-season by sending Moe Mantha to the Pittsburgh Penguins to complete a trade on March 5, 1984, in which Winnipeg acquired Randy Carlyle for the Jets first round draft pick in the 1984 NHL entry draft and future considerations. Mantha, who had been with the team since the 1980–81 season, was coming off a 16-goal and 54 point season with the Jets. The club announced that interim head coach Barry Long would be retained, after he led the Jets to a 25–25–9 record after replacing Tom Watt.

On June 9, 1984, the Jets participated in the 1984 NHL entry draft, but did not draft until the second round, 30th overall, when they selected Peter Douris from the University of New Hampshire. Douris scored 19 goals and 34 points in 37 games with New Hampshire during the 1983–84 season. On June 13, 1984, Winnipeg traded team captain Lucien DeBlois to the Montreal Canadiens for Perry Turnbull. Turnbull split the 1983–84 season between the St. Louis Blues and Montreal Canadiens, scoring 20 goals and 35 points in 72 games. DeBlois was the Jets captain since midway through the 1982–83 season, and in 1983–84, DeBlois had 39 goals and 79 points in 80 games. The Jets named Dale Hawerchuk as DeBlois' replacement as team captain.

== Regular season ==
- February 23, 1985: Patrick Roy earned the first victory of his NHL career. It was a 6–4 victory over the Winnipeg Jets.

=== Final standings ===
Smythe Division
	GP	W	L	T	GF	GA	Pts
**Edmonton Oilers**	80	49	20	11	401	298	109
**Winnipeg Jets**	80	43	27	10	358	332	96
**Calgary Flames**	80	41	27	12	363	302	94
**Los Angeles Kings**	80	34	32	14	339	326	82
Vancouver Canucks	80	25	46	9	284	401	59

Note: GP = Games played, W = Wins, L = Losses, T = Ties, Pts = Points, GF = Goals for, GA = Goals against
Note: Teams that qualified for the playoffs are highlighted in bold.

=== Record vs. opponents ===
Smythe Division record vs. opponents

==== Vs. Campbell Conference ====
**Vs. Smythe Division**

1984–85 NHL records
Team	**CGY**	**EDM**	**LAK**	**VAN**	**WIN**	**Total**
Calgary	—	1−6−1	4−3−1	7−0−1	5−1−2	**17−10−5**
Edmonton	6−1−1	—	4−3−1	3−3−2	5−3	**18−10−4**
Los Angeles	3−4−1	3−4−1	—	4−2−2	2−4−2	**12−14−6**
Vancouver	0−7−1	3−3−2	2−4−2	—	2−5−1	**7−19−6**
Winnipeg	1−5−2	3−5	4−2−2	5−2−1	—	**13−14−5**

**Vs. Norris Division**

1984–85 NHL records
Team	**CHI**	**DET**	**MIN**	**STL**	**TOR**	**Total**
Calgary	1−2	2−1	1−0−2	0−3	3−0	**7−6−2**
Edmonton	3−0	3−0	3−0	3−0	2−0−1	**14−0−1**
Los Angeles	0−2−1	2−1	1−1−1	1−2	2−1	**6−7−2**
Vancouver	1−2	1−2	1−1−1	0−3	1−1−1	**4−9−2**
Winnipeg	1−1−1	2−0−1	2−1	0−1−2	3−0	**8−3−4**

**Vs. Wales Conference**

**Vs. Adams Division**

1984–85 NHL records
Team	**BOS**	**BUF**	**HFD**	**MTL**	**QUE**	**Total**
Calgary	3−0	0−3	3−0	2−0−1	1−1−1	**9−4−2**
Edmonton	2−1	2−0−1	2−1	1−2	3−0	**10−4−1**
Los Angeles	0−1−2	2−0−1	2−0−1	0−2−1	1−2	**5−5−5**
Vancouver	1−2	2−0−1	2−1	2−1	1−2	**8−6−1**
Winnipeg	2−1	2−1	2−1	1−2	2−1	**9−6−0**

**Vs. Patrick Division**

1984–85 NHL records
Team	**NJD**	**NYI**	**NYR**	**PHI**	**PIT**	**WSH**	**Total**
Calgary	2−0−1	2−1	2−0−1	1−2	0−2−1	1−2	**8−7−3**
Edmonton	2−1	2−0−1	1−1−1	0−3	1−1−1	1−0−2	**7−6−5**
Los Angeles	3−0	1−2	2−1	1−1−1	3−0	1−2	**11−6−1**
Vancouver	3−0	1−2	1−2	0−3	1−2	0−3	**6−12−0**
Winnipeg	2−0−1	1−2	3−0	3−0	2−1	2−1	**13−4−1**

== Schedule and results ==
1984–85 regular season
October

Game	Result	Date	Score	Opponent	Record	Attendance
1	W	October 14, 1984	5–2	Toronto Maple Leafs (1984–85)	1–0–0	12,158
2	L	October 17, 1984	4–7	@ Calgary Flames (1984–85)	1–1–0	16,863
3	L	October 19, 1984	4–7	Edmonton Oilers (1984–85)	1–2–0	15,441
4	W	October 21, 1984	3–2	Boston Bruins (1984–85)	2–2–0	13,126
5	W	October 24, 1984	8–4	Hartford Whalers (1984–85)	3–2–0	10,442
6	T	October 27, 1984	2–2 OT	Los Angeles Kings (1984–85)	3–2–1	10,232
7	L	October 29, 1984	3–5	Los Angeles Kings (1984–85)	3–3–1	10,945

November

Game	Result	Date	Score	Opponent	Record	Attendance
8	W	November 1, 1984	7–4	@ Philadelphia Flyers (1984–85)	4–3–1	16,076
9	T	November 2, 1984	3–3 OT	@ Detroit Red Wings (1984–85)	4–3–2	15,094
10	L	November 4, 1984	1–2	Edmonton Oilers (1984–85)	4–4–2	14,176
11	L	November 6, 1984	3–5	@ Quebec Nordiques (1984–85)	4–5–2	13,384
12	W	November 7, 1984	3–0	@ Hartford Whalers (1984–85)	5–5–2	9,871
13	W	November 9, 1984	7–5	Vancouver Canucks (1984–85)	6–5–2	12,879
14	W	November 11, 1984	3–2	Buffalo Sabres (1984–85)	7–5–2	11,208
15	L	November 14, 1984	3–4 OT	Pittsburgh Penguins (1984–85)	7–6–2	9,879
16	L	November 16, 1984	2–6	Calgary Flames (1984–85)	7–7–2	14,309
17	W	November 17, 1984	5–3	@ Toronto Maple Leafs (1984–85)	8–7–2	16,182
18	L	November 21, 1984	5–7	@ Edmonton Oilers (1984–85)	8–8–2	17,498
19	W	November 23, 1984	5–1	@ Vancouver Canucks (1984–85)	9–8–2	9,879
20	W	November 24, 1984	9–5	@ Los Angeles Kings (1984–85)	10–8–2	16,005
21	W	November 27, 1984	5–3	@ Los Angeles Kings (1984–85)	11–8–2	8,990
22	L	November 30, 1984	2–5	New York Islanders (1984–85)	11–9–2	14,015

December

Game	Result	Date	Score	Opponent	Record	Attendance
23	W	December 2, 1984	8–6	Calgary Flames (1984–85)	12–9–2	11,386
24	T	December 4, 1984	2–2 OT	@ St. Louis Blues (1984–85)	12–9–3	10,153
25	W	December 7, 1984	7–5	@ Washington Capitals (1984–85)	13–9–3	12,072
26	W	December 9, 1984	4–2	Minnesota North Stars (1984–85)	14–9–3	10,797
27	W	December 11, 1984	5–4 OT	Philadelphia Flyers (1984–85)	15–9–3	12,034
28	L	December 12, 1984	2–9	@ Calgary Flames (1984–85)	15–10–3	16,683
29	W	December 14, 1984	6–4	Toronto Maple Leafs (1984–85)	16–10–3	12,662
30	W	December 16, 1984	5–2	Detroit Red Wings (1984–85)	17–10–3	12,036
31	L	December 18, 1984	4–7	@ New York Islanders (1984–85)	17–11–3	15,462
32	W	December 19, 1984	5–4	@ New York Rangers (1984–85)	18–11–3	17,252
33	W	December 22, 1984	6–2	Los Angeles Kings (1984–85)	19–11–3	12,556
34	T	December 23, 1984	4–4 OT	Los Angeles Kings (1984–85)	19–11–4	14,751
35	L	December 26, 1984	0–4	@ Minnesota North Stars (1984–85)	19–12–4	14,249
36	L	December 28, 1984	0–4	@ Buffalo Sabres (1984–85)	19–13–4	16,433
37	L	December 30, 1984	3–5	Boston Bruins (1984–85)	19–14–4	14,862

January

Game	Result	Date	Score	Opponent	Record	Attendance
38	L	January 1, 1985	3–5	Calgary Flames (1984–85)	19–15–4	N/A
39	L	January 4, 1985	4–7	@ Edmonton Oilers (1984–85)	19–16–4	17,498
40	L	January 6, 1985	2–7	Edmonton Oilers (1984–85)	19–17–4	14,846
41	W	January 9, 1985	6–5 OT	New York Rangers (1984–85)	20–17–4	13,547
42	L	January 12, 1985	4–6	@ Los Angeles Kings (1984–85)	20–18–4	16,005
43	W	January 13, 1985	6–5	@ Los Angeles Kings (1984–85)	21–18–4	10,666
44	L	January 16, 1985	3–6	@ Chicago Black Hawks (1984–85)	21–19–4	15,681
45	L	January 18, 1985	2–6	St. Louis Blues (1984–85)	21–20–4	13,990
46	W	January 19, 1985	8–5	@ Detroit Red Wings (1984–85)	22–20–4	19,112
47	W	January 21, 1985	7–6	Pittsburgh Penguins (1984–85)	23–20–4	11,398
48	W	January 23, 1985	6–4	@ Vancouver Canucks (1984–85)	24–20–4	8,916
49	L	January 25, 1985	4–7	@ Vancouver Canucks (1984–85)	24–21–4	11,244
50	W	January 27, 1985	6–2	Philadelphia Flyers (1984–85)	25–21–4	13,618
51	T	January 29, 1985	6–6 OT	@ St. Louis Blues (1984–85)	25–21–5	10,107
52	W	January 30, 1985	6–3	@ Chicago Black Hawks (1984–85)	26–21–5	15,392

February

Game	Result	Date	Score	Opponent	Record	Attendance
53	W	February 2, 1985	4–3	@ Boston Bruins (1984–85)	27–21–5	12,523
54	L	February 3, 1985	2–6	@ Washington Capitals (1984–85)	27–22–5	12,528
55	W	February 6, 1985	6–2	Edmonton Oilers (1984–85)	28–22–5	13,998
56	T	February 8, 1985	5–5 OT	Vancouver Canucks (1984–85)	28–22–6	13,994
57	L	February 10, 1985	3–5	Vancouver Canucks (1984–85)	28–23–6	12,503
58	W	February 13, 1985	5–3	Washington Capitals (1984–85)	29–23–6	13,104
59	L	February 16, 1985	4–8	@ Calgary Flames (1984–85)	29–24–6	16,683
60	T	February 17, 1985	2–2 OT	New Jersey Devils (1984–85)	29–24–7	10,626
61	L	February 19, 1985	2–6	Hartford Whalers (1984–85)	29–25–7	10,501
62	W	February 21, 1985	3–2	@ New York Islanders (1984–85)	30–25–7	15,721
63	L	February 23, 1985	4–6	@ Montreal Canadiens (1984–85)	30–26–7	17,907
64	W	February 25, 1985	12–5	@ New York Rangers (1984–85)	31–26–7	17,401
65	W	February 27, 1985	6–4	@ Pittsburgh Penguins (1984–85)	32–26–7	7,622

March

Game	Result	Date	Score	Opponent	Record	Attendance
66	W	March 3, 1985	6–3	@ Edmonton Oilers (1984–85)	33–26–7	17,498
67	L	March 6, 1985	2–4	Montreal Canadiens (1984–85)	33–27–7	15,693
68	W	March 8, 1985	6–3	Quebec Nordiques (1984–85)	34–27–7	13,918
69	W	March 10, 1985	7–1	New Jersey Devils (1984–85)	35–27–7	12,818
70	W	March 12, 1985	6–3	@ New Jersey Devils (1984–85)	36–27–7	9,168
71	W	March 14, 1985	4–1	@ Montreal Canadiens (1984–85)	37–27–7	16,900
72	W	March 15, 1985	3–2 OT	@ Quebec Nordiques (1984–85)	38–27–7	15,182
73	W	March 17, 1985	5–3	Buffalo Sabres (1984–85)	39–27–7	15,466
74	W	March 20, 1985	5–2	Minnesota North Stars (1984–85)	40–27–7	12,846
75	W	March 23, 1985	6–4	Vancouver Canucks (1984–85)	41–27–7	13,640
76	W	March 27, 1985	5–3	@ Vancouver Canucks (1984–85)	42–27–7	10,512
77	T	March 29, 1985	5–5 OT	Chicago Black Hawks (1984–85)	42–27–8	15,650
78	T	March 31, 1985	4–4 OT	Calgary Flames (1984–85)	42–27–9	15,642

April

Game	Result	Date	Score	Opponent	Record	Attendance
79	W	April 6, 1985	6–5	@ Edmonton Oilers (1984–85)	43–27–9	17,498
80	T	April 7, 1985	4–4 OT	@ Calgary Flames (1984–85)	43–27–10	16,843

Legend: Win (2 points) Loss (0 points) Tie (1 point)

== Playoffs ==
The Jets beat the Calgary Flames in the Division semi-finals, 3 games to 1. The Jets were swept in 4 games by the Edmonton Oilers in the Division finals.

== Player statistics ==
=== Regular season ===
Scoring

Player	Pos	GP	G	A	Pts	PIM	+/-	PPG	SHG	GWG
Dale Hawerchuk	C	80	53	77	130	74	22	17	3	4
Paul MacLean	RW	79	41	60	101	119	5	14	0	6
Thomas Steen	C	79	30	54	84	80	-1	7	2	4
Laurie Boschman	C	80	32	44	76	180	-8	5	2	4
Brian Mullen	RW	69	32	39	71	32	15	8	0	4
Doug Smail	LW	80	31	35	66	45	12	0	3	5
Dave Babych	D	78	13	49	62	78	-16	6	0	1
Randy Carlyle	D	71	13	38	51	98	23	6	0	2
Scott Arniel	LW	79	22	22	44	81	7	3	0	3
Perry Turnbull	C	66	22	21	43	130	9	2	0	1
Dave Ellett	D	80	11	27	38	85	20	3	0	0
Robert Picard	D	78	12	22	34	107	31	0	0	3
Bengt Lundholm	LW	78	12	18	30	20	8	1	0	1
Andrew McBain	RW	77	7	15	22	45	-2	0	0	0
Tim Watters	D	63	2	20	22	74	20	0	0	1
Ron Wilson	C	75	10	9	19	31	-8	1	1	1
Jim Nill	RW	20	8	8	16	38	2	1	0	1
Morris Lukowich	LW	47	5	9	14	31	-13	1	0	2
Wade Campbell	D	40	1	6	7	21	1	0	1	0
Brian Hayward	G	61	0	4	4	10	0	0	0	0
Murray Eaves	C	3	0	3	3	0	3	0	0	0
Jim Kyte	D	71	0	3	3	111	-26	0	0	0
Jordy Douglas	LW	7	0	2	2	0	-6	0	0	0
Paul Pooley	C	12	0	2	2	0	1	0	0	0
Tom Martin	LW	8	1	0	1	42	1	0	0	0
Mark Holden	G	4	0	1	1	0	0	0	0	0
Marc Behrend	G	23	0	0	0	0	0	0	0	0
Bobby Dollas	D	9	0	0	0	0	4	0	0	0
Dan McFall	D	2	0	0	0	0	-3	0	0	0
Peter Taglianetti	D	1	0	0	0	0	1	0	0	0

Goaltending

Player	MIN	GP	W	L	T	GA	GAA	SO
Brian Hayward	3436	61	33	17	7	220	3.84	0
Marc Behrend	1218	24	8	10	3	87	4.29	1
Mark Holden	213	4	2	0	0	15	4.23	0
Team:	4867	80	43	27	10	322	3.97	1

=== Playoffs ===
Scoring

Player	Pos	GP	G	A	Pts	PIM	+/-	PPG	SHG	GWG
Dave Babych	D	8	2	7	9	6	-3	2	0	0
Paul MacLean	RW	8	3	4	7	4	-2	2	0	0
Ron Wilson	C	8	4	2	6	2	4	0	0	1
Randy Carlyle	D	8	1	5	6	13	-4	1	0	0
Dave Ellett	D	8	1	5	6	4	-3	1	0	0
Thomas Steen	C	8	2	3	5	17	-13	2	0	0
Bengt Lundholm	LW	5	2	2	4	8	-4	0	2	0
Robert Picard	D	8	2	2	4	8	-5	1	0	0
Laurie Boschman	C	8	2	1	3	21	-3	0	1	0
Dale Hawerchuk	C	3	2	1	3	4	1	1	0	0
Doug Smail	LW	8	2	1	3	4	-5	0	1	0
Scott Arniel	LW	8	1	2	3	9	-2	0	0	1
Brian Mullen	RW	8	1	2	3	4	-1	0	0	1
Andrew McBain	RW	7	1	0	1	0	-1	0	0	0
Murray Eaves	C	2	0	1	1	0	1	0	0	0
Jim Nill	RW	8	0	1	1	28	-4	0	0	0
Perry Turnbull	C	8	0	1	1	26	-7	0	0	0
Tim Watters	D	8	0	1	1	16	-2	0	0	0
Marc Behrend	G	4	0	0	0	0	0	0	0	0
Wade Campbell	D	3	0	0	0	2	1	0	0	0
Brian Hayward	G	6	0	0	0	0	0	0	0	0
Jim Kyte	D	8	0	0	0	14	-2	0	0	0
Tom Martin	LW	3	0	0	0	2	0	0	0	0
Peter Taglianetti	D	1	0	0	0	0	-1	0	0	0

Goaltending

Player	MIN	GP	W	L	GA	GAA	SO
Brian Hayward	309	6	2	4	23	4.47	0
Marc Behrend	179	4	1	1	10	3.35	0
Team:	488	8	3	5	33	4.06	0

Note:

Pos = Position;GP = Games played; G = Goals; A = Assists; Pts = Points; PIM = Penalty minutes; +/- = Plus/minus; PPG = Power-play goals; SHG = Short-handed goals; GWG = Game-winning goals
Pos = Position;GP = Games played; Min, TOI = Minutes played; W = Wins; L = Losses; T,T/OT = Ties; OTL = Overtime losses; GA = Goals-against; GAA = Goals-against average; SO = Shutouts; SA = Shots against; SV = Shots saved;SV% = Save percentage;

== Transactions ==
=== Trades ===
October 9, 1984	To Montreal Canadiens Doug Soetaert	To Winnipeg Jets Mark Holden
October 16, 1984	To Philadelphia Flyers Tim Young	To Winnipeg Jets Future Considerations
February 2, 1985	To Boston Bruins Morris Lukowich	To Winnipeg Jets Jim Nill

== Draft picks ==
The Jets selected the following players at the 1984 NHL entry draft, which was held at the Montreal Forum in Montreal on June 9, 1984.

=== NHL amateur draft ===
Round	Pick	Player	Nationality	College/Junior/Club team
2	30	Peter Douris (RW)	Canada	University of New Hampshire (NCAA)
4	68	Chris Mills (D)	Canada	Bramalea Jr. B (MTJHL)
4	72	Sean Clement (D)	Canada	Brockville Braves (CJHL)
5	93	Scott Schneider (C)	United States	Colorado College (NCAA)
5	99	Brent Severyn (D)	Canada	Seattle Breakers (WHL)
6	114	Gary Lorden (D)	United States	Bishop Hendricken (RI) High School
7	135	Luciano Borsato (C)	Canada	Bramalea Jr. B (MTJHL)
8	156	Brad Jones (LW)	United States	University of Michigan (NCAA)
9	177	Gord Whitaker (RW)	United States	Colorado College (NCAA)
10	197	Rick Forst (LW)	Canada	Melville Millionaires (SJHL)
11	218	Mike Warus (RW)	Canada	Lake Superior State University (NCAA)
12	238	Jim Edmands (G)	United States	Cornell University (NCAA)

== See also ==
- 1984–85 NHL season
