= 1984–85 New York Islanders season =

NHL hockey team season

1984–85 New York Islanders
- Division: 3rd Patrick
- Conference: 6th Wales
- 1984–85 record: 40–34–6
- Home record: 26–11–3
- Road record: 14–23–3
- Goals for: 345
- Goals against: 312

Team information
- General manager: Bill Torrey
- Coach: Al Arbour
- Captain: Denis Potvin
- Alternate captains: None
- Arena: Nassau Coliseum

Team leaders
- Goals: Mike Bossy (58)
- Assists: Brent Sutter (60)
- Points: Mike Bossy (117)
- Penalty minutes: Duane Sutter (174)
- Wins: Kelly Hrudey (19)
- Goals against average: Kelly Hrudey (3.63)

The 1984–85 New York Islanders season was the 13th season for the franchise in the National Hockey League (NHL).

== Offseason ==
=== NHL draft ===
Round	Pick	Player	Position	School/Club team
1	20	Duncan MacPherson	Defense	Saskatoon Blades (WHL)
2	41	Bruce Melanson	Right wing	Oshawa Generals (OHL)
3	62	Jeff Norton	Defense	Cushing Academy (USHS-MA)
4	70	Doug Wieck	Left wing	Mayo High School (USHS-MN)
4	83	Ari Haanpaa	Right wing	Ilves (Finland)
5	104	Mike Murray	Center	London Knights (OHL)
6	125	Jim Wilharm	Defense	Minnetonka High School (USHS-MN)
7	146	Kelly Murphy	Defense	Notre Dame Hounds (SJHL)
8	167	Franco DeSantis	Defense	Verdun Juniors (QMJHL)
9	187	Tom Warden	Defense	North Bay Centennials (OHL)
10	208	David Volek	Right wing	HC Slavia Praha (Czechoslovakia)
11	228	Russ Becker	Defense	Virginia High School (USHS-MN)
12	249	Allister Brown	Defense	University of New Hampshire (ECAC)

== Regular season ==
=== Season standings ===
Patrick Division
	GP	W	L	T	GF	GA	Pts
**Philadelphia Flyers**	80	53	20	7	348	241	113
**Washington Capitals**	80	46	25	9	322	240	101
**New York Islanders**	80	40	34	6	345	312	86
**New York Rangers**	80	26	44	10	295	345	62
New Jersey Devils	80	22	48	10	264	346	54
Pittsburgh Penguins	80	24	51	5	276	385	53

Note: GP = Games played, W = Wins, L = Losses, T = Ties, Pts = Points, GF = Goals for, GA = Goals against
Note: Teams that qualified for the playoffs are highlighted in bold.

=== Record vs. opponents ===
Patrick Division record vs. opponents

==== Vs. Wales Conference ====
**Vs. Patrick Division**

1984–85 NHL records
Team	**NJD**	**NYI**	**NYR**	**PHI**	**PIT**	**WSH**	**Total**
New Jersey	—	3−2−2	2−5	2−5	5−2	2−4−1	14−18−3
N.Y. Islanders	2−3−2	—	4−3	3−3−1	5−2	3−4	17−15−3
N.Y. Rangers	5−2	3−4	—	0−7	4−3	2−5	14−21−0
Philadelphia	5−2	3−3−1	7−0	—	5−2	5−1−1	25−8−2
Pittsburgh	2−5	2−5	3−4	2–5	—	0−6−1	9−25−1
Washington	4−2−1	4−3	5−2	1–5−1	6−0–1	—	20−13−2

**Vs. Adams Division**

1984–85 NHL records
Team	**BOS**	**BUF**	**HFD**	**MTL**	**QUE**	**Total**
New Jersey	0−3	0−3	0−3	1−1−1	1−1−1	2−11−2
N.Y. Islanders	1−2	2−1	1−1−1	1−2	0−3	5−9−1
N.Y. Rangers	0−1−2	1−1−1	0−1−2	0−2−1	1−2	2−7−6
Philadelphia	2−1	1−1−1	2−0−1	1−2	1−1−1	7−5−3
Pittsburgh	1−2	0−2−1	1−2	1−2	0−3	3−11−1
Washington	2−1	1−2	1−2	1−1−1	2−1	7−7−1

==== Vs. Campbell Conference ====
**Vs. Norris Division**

1984–85 NHL records
Team	**CHI**	**DET**	**MIN**	**STL**	**TOR**	**Total**
New Jersey	0−3	1−1−1	1−1−1	0−2−1	3−0	5−7−3
N.Y. Islanders	3−0	2−1	1−1−1	3−0	2−1	11−3−1
N.Y. Rangers	0−3	1−2	1−2	2−0−1	2−0−1	6−7−2
Philadelphia	2−1	2−0−1	3−0	3−0	2−1	12−2−1
Pittsburgh	1−2	1−1−1	1−2	1−2	2−1	6−8−1
Washington	3−0	2−1	2−0−1	2−0−1	2−0−1	11−1−3

**Vs. Smythe Division**

1984–85 NHL records
Team	**CGY**	**EDM**	**LAK**	**VAN**	**WIN**	**Total**
New Jersey	0−2−1	1−2	0−3	0−3	0−2−1	1−12−2
N.Y. Islanders	1−2	0−2−1	2−1	2−1	2−1	7−7−1
N.Y. Rangers	0−2−1	1−1−1	1−2	2−1	0−3	4−9−2
Philadelphia	2−1	3−0	1−1−1	3−0	0−3	9−5−1
Pittsburgh	2−0−1	1−1−1	0−3	2−1	1−2	6−7−2
Washington	2−1	0−1−2	2−1	3−0	1−2	8−5−2

== Schedule and results ==
1984–85 regular season
October

Game	Result	Date	Score	Opponent	Record
1	L	October 12, 1984	2–7	@ New Jersey Devils (1984–85)	0–1–0
2	W	October 13, 1984	7–6 OT	Chicago Black Hawks (1984–85)	1–1–0
3	W	October 16, 1984	6–4	New Jersey Devils (1984–85)	2–1–0
4	W	October 17, 1984	6–4	@ Detroit Red Wings (1984–85)	3–1–0
5	W	October 20, 1984	8–3	Los Angeles Kings (1984–85)	4–1–0
6	L	October 21, 1984	5–6	@ New York Rangers (1984–85)	4–2–0
7	W	October 23, 1984	6–5	Vancouver Canucks (1984–85)	5–2–0
8	L	October 27, 1984	3–8	Boston Bruins (1984–85)	5–3–0
9	W	October 30, 1984	7–3	New York Rangers (1984–85)	6–3–0

November

Game	Result	Date	Score	Opponent	Record
10	L	November 1, 1984	5–6 OT	@ Montreal Canadiens (1984–85)	6–4–0
11	L	November 3, 1984	4–5	@ Quebec Nordiques (1984–85)	6–5–0
12	L	November 4, 1984	2–6	@ Boston Bruins (1984–85)	6–6–0
13	W	November 6, 1984	6–3	St. Louis Blues (1984–85)	7–6–0
14	L	November 9, 1984	4–5 OT	@ New York Rangers (1984–85)	7–7–0
15	W	November 10, 1984	5–4	Pittsburgh Penguins (1984–85)	8–7–0
16	W	November 15, 1984	6–1	Minnesota North Stars (1984–85)	9–7–0
17	W	November 17, 1984	10–4	New York Rangers (1984–85)	10–7–0
18	T	November 18, 1984	3–3 OT	@ Philadelphia Flyers (1984–85)	10–7–1
19	W	November 20, 1984	5–3	Washington Capitals (1984–85)	11–7–1
20	W	November 23, 1984	5–1	@ Washington Capitals (1984–85)	12–7–1
21	W	November 24, 1984	6–3	Buffalo Sabres (1984–85)	13–7–1
22	L	November 28, 1984	2–5	@ Calgary Flames (1984–85)	13–8–1
23	W	November 30, 1984	5–2	@ Winnipeg Jets (1984–85)	14–8–1

December

Game	Result	Date	Score	Opponent	Record
24	W	December 3, 1984	5–4	@ Vancouver Canucks (1984–85)	15–8–1
25	L	December 5, 1984	4–6	@ Edmonton Oilers (1984–85)	15–9–1
26	L	December 8, 1984	3–4 OT	Hartford Whalers (1984–85)	15–10–1
27	L	December 11, 1984	5–7	New Jersey Devils (1984–85)	15–11–1
28	L	December 12, 1984	3–4	@ Pittsburgh Penguins (1984–85)	15–12–1
29	W	December 15, 1984	6–2	Philadelphia Flyers (1984–85)	16–12–1
30	W	December 18, 1984	7–4	Winnipeg Jets (1984–85)	17–12–1
31	W	December 21, 1984	1–0	@ Hartford Whalers (1984–85)	18–12–1
32	W	December 22, 1984	5–2	Pittsburgh Penguins (1984–85)	19–12–1
33	L	December 26, 1984	5–6	@ Pittsburgh Penguins (1984–85)	19–13–1
34	L	December 27, 1984	4–5 OT	Washington Capitals (1984–85)	19–14–1
35	W	December 29, 1984	5–1	@ St. Louis Blues (1984–85)	20–14–1
36	L	December 31, 1984	3–4	@ Minnesota North Stars (1984–85)	20–15–1

January

Game	Result	Date	Score	Opponent	Record
37	W	January 2, 1985	7–2	@ Detroit Red Wings (1984–85)	21–15–1
38	L	January 5, 1985	3–7	Buffalo Sabres (1984–85)	21–16–1
39	W	January 8, 1985	3–1	Montreal Canadiens (1984–85)	22–16–1
40	W	January 10, 1985	3–2	@ New Jersey Devils (1984–85)	23–16–1
41	W	January 12, 1985	5–3	Philadelphia Flyers (1984–85)	24–16–1
42	W	January 13, 1985	6–5	@ Chicago Black Hawks (1984–85)	25–16–1
43	L	January 15, 1985	5–6 OT	@ Vancouver Canucks (1984–85)	25–17–1
44	T	January 16, 1985	3–3 OT	@ Edmonton Oilers (1984–85)	25–17–2
45	L	January 19, 1985	5–6 OT	@ Los Angeles Kings (1984–85)	25–18–2
46	L	January 22, 1985	4–5	Detroit Red Wings (1984–85)	25–19–2
47	W	January 24, 1985	4–1	Toronto Maple Leafs (1984–85)	26–19–2
48	L	January 26, 1985	1–5	Washington Capitals (1984–85)	26–20–2
49	L	January 27, 1985	2–5	@ Washington Capitals (1984–85)	26–21–2
50	T	January 29, 1985	4–4 OT	Minnesota North Stars (1984–85)	26–21–3

February

Game	Result	Date	Score	Opponent	Record
51	L	February 1, 1985	2–3	@ New Jersey Devils (1984–85)	26–22–3
52	W	February 2, 1985	4–0	@ Pittsburgh Penguins (1984–85)	27–22–3
53	W	February 5, 1985	7–5	Philadelphia Flyers (1984–85)	28–22–3
54	W	February 7, 1985	7–5	New York Rangers (1984–85)	29–22–3
55	W	February 9, 1985	4–1	Pittsburgh Penguins (1984–85)	30–22–3
56	T	February 16, 1985	4–4 OT	Hartford Whalers (1984–85)	30–22–4
57	L	February 17, 1985	3–9	@ New York Rangers (1984–85)	30–23–4
58	W	February 19, 1985	8–4	Calgary Flames (1984–85)	31–23–4
59	L	February 21, 1985	2–3	Winnipeg Jets (1984–85)	31–24–4
60	W	February 23, 1985	7–1	Boston Bruins (1984–85)	32–24–4
61	L	February 24, 1985	3–4 OT	@ Montreal Canadiens (1984–85)	32–25–4
62	L	February 27, 1985	1–3	@ Calgary Flames (1984–85)	32–26–4

March

Game	Result	Date	Score	Opponent	Record
63	L	March 2, 1985	2–4	@ Toronto Maple Leafs (1984–85)	32–27–4
64	W	March 3, 1985	3–2	@ Buffalo Sabres (1984–85)	33–27–4
65	L	March 5, 1985	4–5 OT	Philadelphia Flyers (1984–85)	33–28–4
66	T	March 7, 1985	4–4 OT	@ New Jersey Devils (1984–85)	33–28–5
67	W	March 9, 1985	4–2	Toronto Maple Leafs (1984–85)	34–28–5
68	W	March 12, 1985	6–5	@ St. Louis Blues (1984–85)	35–28–5
69	W	March 13, 1985	4–3	@ Chicago Black Hawks (1984–85)	36–28–5
70	W	March 16, 1985	6–4	Washington Capitals (1984–85)	37–28–5
71	L	March 17, 1985	3–5	@ Philadelphia Flyers (1984–85)	37–29–5
72	W	March 19, 1985	3–2	Los Angeles Kings (1984–85)	38–29–5
73	L	March 21, 1985	1–5	Quebec Nordiques (1984–85)	38–30–5
74	W	March 24, 1985	5–2	@ New York Rangers (1984–85)	39–30–5
75	L	March 26, 1985	5–7	Edmonton Oilers (1984–85)	39–31–5
76	L	March 28, 1985	2–4	@ Quebec Nordiques (1984–85)	39–32–5
77	L	March 30, 1985	3–4	@ Washington Capitals (1984–85)	39–33–5

April

Game	Result	Date	Score	Opponent	Record
78	W	April 2, 1985	4–3	Pittsburgh Penguins (1984–85)	40–33–5
79	L	April 4, 1985	0–3	@ Philadelphia Flyers (1984–85)	40–34–5
80	T	April 6, 1985	5–5 OT	New Jersey Devils (1984–85)	40–34–6

Legend: Win (2 points) Loss (0 points) Tie (1 point)

== Playoffs ==
1985 Stanley Cup playoffs
Division Semifinals vs. (P2) Washington Capitals – Islanders win 3–2

Game	Date	Visitor	Score	Home	OT	Series
1	April 10	NY Islanders	3 – 4	Washington	OT	0 – 1
2	April 11	NY Islanders	1 – 2	Washington	2OT	0 – 2
3	April 13	Washington	1 – 2	NY Islanders		1 – 2
4	April 14	Washington	4 – 6	NY Islanders		2 – 2
5	April 16	NY Islanders	2 – 1	Washington		3 – 2

Division Finals vs. (P1) Philadelphia Flyers – Flyers win 4–1

Game	Date	Visitor	Score	Home	OT	Series
1	April 18	NY Islanders	0 – 3	Philadelphia		0 – 1
2	April 21	NY Islanders	2 – 5	Philadelphia		0 – 2
3	April 23	Philadelphia	5 – 3	NY Islanders		0 – 3
4	April 25	Philadelphia	2 – 6	NY Islanders		1 – 3
5	April 28	NY Islanders	0 – 1	Philadelphia		1 – 4

Legend: Win Loss

== Player statistics ==
Regular season
Scoring

Player	Pos	GP	G	A	Pts	PIM	+/-	PPG	SHG	GWG
Mike Bossy	RW	76	58	59	117	38	37	14	4	7
Brent Sutter	C	72	42	60	102	51	42	12	0	4
John Tonelli	LW	80	42	58	100	95	50	8	1	3
Denis Potvin	D	77	17	51	68	96	36	6	0	1
Bryan Trottier	C	68	28	31	59	47	5	4	5	3
Pat LaFontaine	C	67	19	35	54	32	9	1	0	1
Pat Flatley	RW	78	20	31	51	106	-8	2	0	4
Tomas Jonsson	D	69	16	34	50	58	-1	8	0	4
Duane Sutter	RW	78	17	24	41	174	-12	1	0	1
Greg Gilbert	LW	58	13	25	38	36	-4	2	0	2
Paul Boutilier	D	78	12	23	35	90	0	2	1	3
Clark Gillies	LW	54	15	17	32	73	0	5	0	2
Stefan Persson	D	54	3	19	22	30	8	3	0	0
Bob Bourne	C	44	8	12	20	51	-8	1	0	1
Anders Kallur	RW	51	10	8	18	26	-9	0	2	2
Gord Dineen	D	48	1	12	13	89	10	0	0	0
Dave Langevin	D	56	0	13	13	35	-6	0	0	0
Roger Kortko	C	27	2	9	11	9	-3	1	0	0
Gerald Diduck	D	65	2	8	10	80	2	0	0	0
Gord Lane	D	57	1	8	9	83	10	0	0	0
Ken Morrow	D	15	1	7	8	14	5	0	0	0
Butch Goring	C	29	2	5	7	2	-11	0	1	0
Bob Nystrom	RW	36	2	5	7	58	6	0	0	0
Mats Hallin	LW	38	5	0	5	50	-7	0	0	1
Scott Howson	C	8	4	1	5	2	4	1	0	0
Alan Kerr	RW	19	3	1	4	24	-7	0	0	0
Dale Henry	LW	16	2	1	3	19	1	0	0	1
Ron Handy	LW	10	0	2	2	0	-1	0	0	0
Ken Leiter	D	5	0	2	2	2	0	0	0	0
Kelly Hrudey	G	41	0	1	1	17	0	0	0	0
Mark Hamway	RW	2	0	0	0	0	0	0	0	0
Roland Melanson	G	8	0	0	0	0	0	0	0	0
Billy Smith	G	37	0	0	0	25	0	0	0	0
Vern Smith	D	1	0	0	0	0	0	0	0	0

Goaltending

Player	MIN	GP	W	L	T	GA	GAA	SO
Kelly Hrudey	2335	41	19	17	3	141	3.62	2
Billy Smith	2090	37	18	14	3	133	3.82	0
Roland Melanson	425	8	3	3	0	35	4.94	0
Team:	4850	80	40	34	6	309	3.82	2

Playoffs
Scoring

Player	Pos	GP	G	A	Pts	PIM	+/-	PPG	SHG	GWG
Mike Bossy	RW	10	5	6	11	4	1	2	0	0
John Tonelli	LW	10	1	8	9	10	1	0	0	0
Bryan Trottier	C	10	4	2	6	8	0	1	0	1
Brent Sutter	C	10	3	3	6	14	-4	1	0	2
Denis Potvin	D	10	3	2	5	10	0	1	0	1
Bob Nystrom	RW	10	2	2	4	29	1	0	0	0
Stefan Persson	D	10	0	4	4	4	5	0	0	0
Tomas Jonsson	D	7	1	2	3	10	2	1	0	0
Pat LaFontaine	C	9	1	2	3	4	-3	0	0	0
Roger Kortko	C	10	0	3	3	17	0	0	0	0
Anders Kallur	RW	10	2	0	2	0	0	0	0	0
Bob Bourne	C	10	0	2	2	6	-2	0	0	0
Paul Boutilier	D	10	0	2	2	16	0	0	0	0
Duane Sutter	RW	10	0	2	2	47	-5	0	0	0
Pat Flatley	RW	4	1	0	1	6	-2	0	0	0
Clark Gillies	LW	10	1	0	1	9	0	0	0	0
Alan Kerr	RW	4	1	0	1	4	0	1	0	0
Gord Dineen	D	10	0	0	0	26	-7	0	0	0
Mats Hallin	LW	1	0	0	0	0	0	0	0	0
Kelly Hrudey	G	5	0	0	0	0	0	0	0	0
Gord Lane	D	1	0	0	0	2	-3	0	0	0
Dave Langevin	D	4	0	0	0	4	-1	0	0	0
Ken Morrow	D	10	0	0	0	17	-3	0	0	0
Billy Smith	G	6	0	0	0	6	0	0	0	0

Goaltending

Player	MIN	GP	W	L	GA	GAA	SO
Billy Smith	342	6	3	3	19	3.33	0
Kelly Hrudey	281	5	1	3	8	1.71	0
Team:	623	10	4	6	27	2.60	0

Note: Pos = Position; GP = Games played; G = Goals; A = Assists; Pts = Points; +/- = plus/minus; PIM = Penalty minutes; PPG = Power-play goals; SHG = Short-handed goals; GWG = Game-winning goals
MIN = Minutes played; W = Wins; L = Losses; T = Ties; GA = Goals-against; GAA = Goals-against average; SO = Shutouts;
