= 1984–85 Pittsburgh Penguins season =

NHL team season

1984–85 Pittsburgh Penguins
- Division: 6th Patrick
- Conference: 11th Wales
- 1984–85 record: 24–51–5
- Home record: 17–20–3
- Road record: 7–31–2
- Goals for: 276
- Goals against: 385

Team information
- General manager: Eddie Johnston
- Coach: Bob Berry
- Captain: Mike Bullard
- Alternate captains: None
- Arena: Pittsburgh Civic Arena
- Average attendance: 10,018

Team leaders
- Goals: Mario Lemieux (43)
- Assists: Mario Lemieux (57)
- Points: Mario Lemieux (100)
- Penalty minutes: Gary Rissling (209)
- Wins: Denis Herron (10)
- Goals against average: Roberto Romano (4.42)

The 1984–85 Pittsburgh Penguins season was the team's eighteenth in the National Hockey League (NHL). It marked the debut of Mario Lemieux for the Penguins. The Penguins failed to qualify for the playoffs for the third consecutive year for the first time in franchise history, and finished last in the Prince of Wales Conference with 53 points, the second-worst in the NHL.

== Background ==
Lemieux debuted with the Penguins on October 11, 1984, in a game against the Boston Bruins; he scored a goal with his very first NHL shot during his first shift. Later that season, Lemieux played in the NHL All-Star Game and became the first rookie to be named the All-Star Game's Most Valuable Player.

Despite missing seven games during the season, Lemieux scored one hundred points and won the Calder Memorial Trophy as the rookie of the year.

== Offseason ==
Before the 1984 NHL entry draft, Lemieux announced he wanted to play for whoever drafted him. He and his agent were deadlocked with the Penguins and could not negotiate a contract. Because of this, when the Penguins called his name as the first overall draft pick, he did not shake general manager Eddie Johnston's hand or don the Penguins jersey, as is NHL tradition. He claimed he was upset about the contract negotiation, and said that "Pittsburgh doesn't want [him] bad enough."

Even though the draft was held in Montreal, more than three thousand fans viewed the broadcast in Pittsburgh's Civic Arena. In contrast, a typical Penguins game drew fewer than seven thousand fans. Lemieux's actions upset many fans and led to accusations of arrogance and aloofness.

After the draft, Johnston signed Lemieux to a two-year contract for $600,000, plus a $150,000 bonus for signing. Although Lemieux wore the jersey #27 during his time with the Laval Voisins, he wanted to adopt Wayne Gretzky's #99 when he entered the NHL; however, his agent advised him to create his own identity. In response, Lemieux turned #99 upside down and landed on #66, which stayed with him throughout his career.

== Regular season ==
=== Season standings ===
Patrick Division
	GP	W	L	T	GF	GA	Pts
**Philadelphia Flyers**	80	53	20	7	348	241	113
**Washington Capitals**	80	46	25	9	322	240	101
**New York Islanders**	80	40	34	6	345	312	86
**New York Rangers**	80	26	44	10	295	345	62
New Jersey Devils	80	22	48	10	264	346	54
Pittsburgh Penguins	80	24	51	5	276	385	53

Note: GP = Games played, W = Wins, L = Losses, T = Ties, Pts = Points, GF = Goals for, GA = Goals against
Note: Teams that qualified for the playoffs are highlighted in bold.

=== Record vs. opponents ===
Patrick Division record vs. opponents

==== Vs. Wales Conference ====
**Vs. Patrick Division**

1984–85 NHL records
Team	**NJD**	**NYI**	**NYR**	**PHI**	**PIT**	**WSH**	**Total**
New Jersey	—	3−2−2	2−5	2−5	5−2	2−4−1	14−18−3
N.Y. Islanders	2−3−2	—	4−3	3−3−1	5−2	3−4	17−15−3
N.Y. Rangers	5−2	3−4	—	0−7	4−3	2−5	14−21−0
Philadelphia	5−2	3−3−1	7−0	—	5−2	5−1−1	25−8−2
Pittsburgh	2−5	2−5	3−4	2–5	—	0−6−1	9−25−1
Washington	4−2−1	4−3	5−2	1–5−1	6−0–1	—	20−13−2

**Vs. Adams Division**

1984–85 NHL records
Team	**BOS**	**BUF**	**HFD**	**MTL**	**QUE**	**Total**
New Jersey	0−3	0−3	0−3	1−1−1	1−1−1	2−11−2
N.Y. Islanders	1−2	2−1	1−1−1	1−2	0−3	5−9−1
N.Y. Rangers	0−1−2	1−1−1	0−1−2	0−2−1	1−2	2−7−6
Philadelphia	2−1	1−1−1	2−0−1	1−2	1−1−1	7−5−3
Pittsburgh	1−2	0−2−1	1−2	1−2	0−3	3−11−1
Washington	2−1	1−2	1−2	1−1−1	2−1	7−7−1

==== Vs. Campbell Conference ====
**Vs. Norris Division**

1984–85 NHL records
Team	**CHI**	**DET**	**MIN**	**STL**	**TOR**	**Total**
New Jersey	0−3	1−1−1	1−1−1	0−2−1	3−0	5−7−3
N.Y. Islanders	3−0	2−1	1−1−1	3−0	2−1	11−3−1
N.Y. Rangers	0−3	1−2	1−2	2−0−1	2−0−1	6−7−2
Philadelphia	2−1	2−0−1	3−0	3−0	2−1	12−2−1
Pittsburgh	1−2	1−1−1	1−2	1−2	2−1	6−8−1
Washington	3−0	2−1	2−0−1	2−0−1	2−0−1	11−1−3

**Vs. Smythe Division**

1984–85 NHL records
Team	**CGY**	**EDM**	**LAK**	**VAN**	**WIN**	**Total**
New Jersey	0−2−1	1−2	0−3	0−3	0−2−1	1−12−2
N.Y. Islanders	1−2	0−2−1	2−1	2−1	2−1	7−7−1
N.Y. Rangers	0−2−1	1−1−1	1−2	2−1	0−3	4−9−2
Philadelphia	2−1	3−0	1−1−1	3−0	0−3	9−5−1
Pittsburgh	2−0−1	1−1−1	0−3	2−1	1−2	6−7−2
Washington	2−1	0−1−2	2−1	3−0	1−2	8−5−2

== Schedule and results ==
1984–85 regular season
October: 5–4–0 (home: 4–1–0; road: 1–3–0), 10 points

#	Date	Visitor	Score	Home	Location	Record	Points
1	Oct 11	Pittsburgh Penguins	3–4	Boston Bruins	Boston Garden	0–1–0	0
2	Oct 13	Pittsburgh Penguins	3–4	Montreal Canadiens	Montreal Forum	0–2–0	0
3	Oct 17	Vancouver Canucks	3–4	Pittsburgh Penguins	Civic Arena	1–2–0	2
4	Oct 20	Philadelphia Flyers	1–3	Pittsburgh Penguins	Civic Arena	2–2–0	4
5	Oct 21	Pittsburgh Penguins	2–4	Philadelphia Flyers	The Spectrum	2–3–0	4
6	Oct 24	New Jersey Devils	5–2	Pittsburgh Penguins	Civic Arena	2–4–0	4
7	Oct 27	Montreal Canadiens	5–6	Pittsburgh Penguins	Civic Arena	3–4–0	6
8	Oct 30	Detroit Red Wings	3–4	Pittsburgh Penguins	Civic Arena	4–4–0	8
9	Oct 31	Pittsburgh Penguins	7–6	New Jersey Devils	Brendan Byrne Arena	5–4–0	10

November: 1–8–3 (home: 0–4–3; road: 1–4–0), 5 points

#	Date	Visitor	Score	Home	Location	Record	Points
10	Nov 3	New York Rangers	7–5	Pittsburgh Penguins	Civic Arena	5–5–0	10
11	Nov 6	Edmonton Oilers	3–3 OT	Pittsburgh Penguins	Civic Arena	5–5–1	11
12	Nov 8	St. Louis Blues	6–2	Pittsburgh Penguins	Civic Arena	5–6–1	11
13	Nov 10	Pittsburgh Penguins	4–5	New York Islanders	Nassau Veterans Memorial Coliseum	5–7–1	11
14	Nov 14	Pittsburgh Penguins	4–3 OT	Winnipeg Jets	Winnipeg Arena	6–7–1	13
15	Nov 16	Pittsburgh Penguins	6–7	Vancouver Canucks	Pacific Coliseum	6–8–1	13
16	Nov 17	Pittsburgh Penguins	3–5	Los Angeles Kings	The Forum	6–9–1	13
17	Nov 21	Washington Capitals	3–3 OT	Pittsburgh Penguins	Civic Arena	6–9–2	14
18	Nov 22	Pittsburgh Penguins	3–9	Hartford Whalers	Hartford Civic Center	6–10–2	14
19	Nov 24	New Jersey Devils	5–3	Pittsburgh Penguins	Civic Arena	6–11–2	14
20	Nov 27	Buffalo Sabres	2–2 OT	Pittsburgh Penguins	Civic Arena	6–11–3	15
21	Nov 29	Chicago Black Hawks	6–3	Pittsburgh Penguins	Civic Arena	6–12–3	15

December: 8–5–1 (home: 6–1–0; road: 2–4–1), 17 points

#	Date	Visitor	Score	Home	Location	Record	Points
22	Dec 1	Pittsburgh Penguins	1–3	Philadelphia Flyers	The Spectrum	6–13–3	15
23	Dec 2	Pittsburgh Penguins	1–9	Washington Capitals	Capital Centre	6–14–3	15
24	Dec 5	St. Louis Blues	4–7	Pittsburgh Penguins	Civic Arena	7–14–3	17
25	Dec 7	Pittsburgh Penguins	4–3 OT	New York Rangers	Madison Square Garden (IV)	8–14–3	19
26	Dec 8	Calgary Flames	4–6	Pittsburgh Penguins	Civic Arena	9–14–3	21
27	Dec 12	New York Islanders	3–4	Pittsburgh Penguins	Civic Arena	10–14–3	23
28	Dec 15	Pittsburgh Penguins	5–2	Toronto Maple Leafs	Maple Leaf Gardens	11–14–3	25
29	Dec 19	New Jersey Devils	3–2	Pittsburgh Penguins	Civic Arena	11–15–3	25
30	Dec 21	Philadelphia Flyers	2–4	Pittsburgh Penguins	Civic Arena	12–15–3	27
31	Dec 22	Pittsburgh Penguins	2–5	New York Islanders	Nassau Veterans Memorial Coliseum	12–16–3	27
32	Dec 26	New York Islanders	5–6	Pittsburgh Penguins	Civic Arena	13–16–3	29
33	Dec 28	Hartford Whalers	0–4	Pittsburgh Penguins	Civic Arena	14–16–3	31
34	Dec 29	Pittsburgh Penguins	2–10	Quebec Nordiques	Colisée de Québec	14–17–3	31
35	Dec 31	Pittsburgh Penguins	4–4 OT	Detroit Red Wings	Joe Louis Arena	14–17–4	32

January: 4–8–1 (home: 3–3–0; road: 1–5–1), 9 points

#	Date	Visitor	Score	Home	Location	Record	Points
36	Jan 2	Pittsburgh Penguins	2–1	Toronto Maple Leafs	Maple Leaf Gardens	15–17–4	34
37	Jan 4	Pittsburgh Penguins	2–7	Buffalo Sabres	Buffalo Memorial Auditorium	15–18–4	34
38	Jan 5	Quebec Nordiques	8–3	Pittsburgh Penguins	Civic Arena	15–19–4	34
39	Jan 9	Vancouver Canucks	4–7	Pittsburgh Penguins	Civic Arena	16–19–4	36
40	Jan 12	Edmonton Oilers	3–4	Pittsburgh Penguins	Civic Arena	17–19–4	38
41	Jan 16	Washington Capitals	5–4	Pittsburgh Penguins	Civic Arena	17–20–4	38
42	Jan 17	Pittsburgh Penguins	2–6	Washington Capitals	Capital Centre	17–21–4	38
43	Jan 19	Chicago Black Hawks	4–5	Pittsburgh Penguins	Civic Arena	18–21–4	40
44	Jan 21	Pittsburgh Penguins	6–7	Winnipeg Jets	Winnipeg Arena	18–22–4	40
45	Jan 23	Pittsburgh Penguins	3–4	Minnesota North Stars	Met Center	18–23–4	40
46	Jan 25	Pittsburgh Penguins	6–6 OT	Calgary Flames	Olympic Saddledome	18–23–5	41
47	Jan 26	Pittsburgh Penguins	3–6	Edmonton Oilers	Northlands Coliseum	18–24–5	41
48	Jan 30	Toronto Maple Leafs	6–5	Pittsburgh Penguins	Civic Arena	18–25–5	41

February: 2–10–0 (home: 1–6–0; road: 1–4–0), 4 points

#	Date	Visitor	Score	Home	Location	Record	Points
49	Feb 2	New York Islanders	4–0	Pittsburgh Penguins	Civic Arena	18–26–5	41
50	Feb 7	Pittsburgh Penguins	3–6	New Jersey Devils	Brendan Byrne Arena	18–27–5	41
51	Feb 9	Pittsburgh Penguins	1–4	New York Islanders	Nassau Veterans Memorial Coliseum	18–28–5	41
52	Feb 10	Los Angeles Kings	4–3	Pittsburgh Penguins	Civic Arena	18–29–5	41
53	Feb 14	Pittsburgh Penguins	4–5	Chicago Black Hawks	Chicago Stadium	18–30–5	41
54	Feb 16	Quebec Nordiques	8–1	Pittsburgh Penguins	Civic Arena	18–31–5	41
55	Feb 18	Pittsburgh Penguins	2–8	Philadelphia Flyers	The Spectrum	18–32–5	41
56	Feb 20	Calgary Flames	3–6	Pittsburgh Penguins	Civic Arena	19–32–5	43
57	Feb 22	New York Rangers	8–3	Pittsburgh Penguins	Civic Arena	19–33–5	43
58	Feb 23	Pittsburgh Penguins	3–1	Minnesota North Stars	Met Center	20–33–5	45
59	Feb 25	Minnesota North Stars	5–4	Pittsburgh Penguins	Civic Arena	20–34–5	45
60	Feb 27	Winnipeg Jets	6–4	Pittsburgh Penguins	Civic Arena	20–35–5	45

March: 4–12–0 (home: 3–3–0; road: 1–9–0), 8 points

#	Date	Visitor	Score	Home	Location	Record	Points
61	Mar 2	New York Rangers	4–5	Pittsburgh Penguins	Civic Arena	21–35–5	47
62	Mar 3	Pittsburgh Penguins	3–7	New York Rangers	Madison Square Garden (IV)	21–36–5	47
63	Mar 5	Pittsburgh Penguins	0–6	Los Angeles Kings	The Forum	21–37–5	47
64	Mar 7	Pittsburgh Penguins	1–5	St. Louis Blues	St. Louis Arena	21–38–5	47
65	Mar 9	Pittsburgh Penguins	6–5 OT	Boston Bruins	Boston Garden	22–38–5	49
66	Mar 10	Pittsburgh Penguins	4–11	Philadelphia Flyers	The Spectrum	22–39–5	49
67	Mar 13	Boston Bruins	7–3	Pittsburgh Penguins	Civic Arena	22–40–5	49
68	Mar 16	New York Rangers	0–5	Pittsburgh Penguins	Civic Arena	23–40–5	51
69	Mar 17	Pittsburgh Penguins	3–4	Hartford Whalers	Hartford Civic Center	23–41–5	51
70	Mar 19	Philadelphia Flyers	5–3	Pittsburgh Penguins	Civic Arena	23–42–5	51
71	Mar 22	Pittsburgh Penguins	1–3	Buffalo Sabres	Buffalo Memorial Auditorium	23–43–5	51
72	Mar 24	Pittsburgh Penguins	3–7	Washington Capitals	Capital Centre	23–44–5	51
73	Mar 26	Pittsburgh Penguins	4–5	New York Rangers	Madison Square Garden (IV)	23–45–5	51
74	Mar 27	New Jersey Devils	3–4	Pittsburgh Penguins	Civic Arena	24–45–5	53
75	Mar 30	Pittsburgh Penguins	4–6	New Jersey Devils	Brendan Byrne Arena	24–46–5	53
76	Mar 31	Montreal Canadiens	4–2	Pittsburgh Penguins	Civic Arena	24–47–5	53

April: 0–4–0 (home: 0–2–0; road: 0–2–0), 0 points

#	Date	Visitor	Score	Home	Location	Record	Points
77	Apr 2	Pittsburgh Penguins	3–4	New York Islanders	Nassau Veterans Memorial Coliseum	24–48–5	53
78	Apr 3	Detroit Red Wings	3–2	Pittsburgh Penguins	Civic Arena	24–49–5	53
79	Apr 6	Washington Capitals	7–4	Pittsburgh Penguins	Civic Arena	24–50–5	53
80	Apr 7	Pittsburgh Penguins	3–7	Washington Capitals	Capital Centre	24–51–5	53

Legend: Win (2 points) Loss (0 points) Tie (1 point)

== Player statistics ==
Skaters

Regular season
Player	GP	G	A	Pts	+/−	PIM
Mario Lemieux	73	43	57	100	–35	54
Warren Young	80	40	32	72	–20	174
Doug Shedden	80	35	32	67	–51	30
Mike Bullard	68	32	31	63	–43	75
Wayne Babych	65	20	34	54	–7	35
John Chabot^{†}	67	8	45	53	–37	12
Moe Mantha Jr.	71	11	40	51	–35	54
Doug Bodger	65	5	26	31	–24	67
Andy Brickley	45	7	15	22	–14	10
Randy Hillier	45	2	19	21	–12	56
Kevin McCarthy	64	9	10	19	–20	30
Gary Rissling	56	10	9	19	–6	209
Troy Loney	46	10	8	18	–11	59
Mitch Lamoureux	62	10	8	18	–9	53
Mark Taylor^{‡}	47	7	10	17	–7	19
Dave Hannan	30	6	7	13	–8	43
Bruce Crowder	26	4	7	11	–9	23
Joe McDonnell	40	2	9	11	–19	20
Todd Charlesworth	67	1	8	9	–23	31
Rod Buskas	69	2	7	9	–21	191
Roger Belanger	44	3	5	8	–13	32
Bryan Maxwell	44	0	8	8	–23	57
Greg Fox	26	2	5	7	–6	26
Ron Flockhart^{‡}	12	0	5	5	4	4
Arto Javanainen	14	4	1	5	1	2
Jim McGeough^{†}	14	0	4	4	–4	4
Pat Boutette^{‡}	14	1	3	4	–5	24
Jim Hamilton	11	2	1	3	–6	0
Wally Weir^{†}	14	0	3	3	1	34
Bob Errey	16	0	2	2	–8	7
Rick Kehoe	6	0	2	2	0	0
Steve Gatzos	6	0	2	2	–6	2
Greg Hotham	11	0	2	2	–3	4
Petteri Lehto	6	0	0	0	–4	4
Bob Geale	1	0	0	0	–1	2
Marty McSorley	15	0	0	0	–3	15
Mike Rowe	6	0	0	0	–7	7
Tom O'Regan	1	0	0	0	–1	0
Total		276	457	733	—	1,469

Goaltenders

Regular Season
Player	GP	TOI	W	L	T	GA	GAA	SA	SV%	SO
Denis Herron	42	2193:00	10	22	3	170	4.65	1362	0.875	1
Roberto Romano	31	1629:00	9	17	2	120	4.42	974	0.877	1
Michel Dion	10	553:00	3	6	0	43	4.67	316	0.864	0
Brian Ford	8	457:00	2	6	0	48	6.30	292	0.836	0
Total		4832:00	24	51	5	381	4.73	2944	0.871	2

^{†}Denotes player spent time with another team before joining the Penguins. Stats reflect time with the Penguins only.
^{‡}Denotes player was traded mid-season. Stats reflect time with the Penguins only.

== Awards and records ==
- Mario Lemieux established a new franchise rookie record for goals (43), assists (57) and points (100). He topped the previous highs held by Pierre Larouche (37 assists, 68 points) and Mike Bullard (36 goals).
- Rick Kehoe established a career franchise record for points (636). He had led the category since 1984.
- Mario Lemieux, Calder Memorial Trophy
- Mario Lemieux, NHL All-Rookie Team
- Warren Young, NHL All-Rookie Team

== Transactions ==
The Penguins were involved in the following transactions during the 1984–85 season:

=== Trades ===
October 15, 1984	To Boston Bruins 1985 4th round pick	To Pittsburgh Penguins Randy Hillier
November 9, 1984	To Montreal Canadiens Ron Flockhart	To Pittsburgh Penguins John Chabot
November 16, 1984	To Hartford Whalers Pat Boutette	To Pittsburgh Penguins rights to Ville Siren
December 6, 1984	To Quebec Nordiques Tom Thornbury	To Pittsburgh Penguins Brian Ford
March 12, 1985	To Washington Capitals Mark Taylor	To Pittsburgh Penguins Jim McGeough

=== Additions and subtractions ===
Additions
Player	Former team	Via
Petteri Lehto	TPS Turku (SM-liiga)	free agency (1984-07)
Wayne Babych	St. Louis Blues	Waiver Draft (1984-10-09)
Bruce Crowder	Boston Bruins	Waiver Draft (1984-10-09)
Joe McDonnell	Edmonton Oilers	free agency (1984-12-30)
Wally Weir	Hartford Whalers	waivers (1985-03-01)

Subtractions
Player	New team	Via
Paul Gardner	Washington Capitals	free agency (1984-07-17)
Darren Lowe	WEV Wien (Austria)	free agency
Vincent Tremblay	Buffalo Sabres	free agency (1985-03-07)

== Draft picks ==
The 1984 NHL entry draft was held on June 9, 1984, in Montreal.

Round	#	Player	Pos	Nationality	College/Junior/Club team (League)
1	1	Mario Lemieux	Center	Canada	Laval Voisins (QMJHL)
1	9	Doug Bodger	Defense	Canada	Kamloops Junior Oilers (WHL)
1	16	Roger Belanger Jr.	Center	Canada	Kingston Canadians (OHL)
4	64	Mark Teevens	Right wing	Canada	Peterborough Petes (OHL)
5	85	Arto Javanainen	Right wing	Finland	Assat Pori (FNL)
7	127	Tom Ryan	Defense	United States	Newton North H.S. (Massachusetts)
9	169	John Del Col	Left wing	Canada	Toronto Marlboros (OHL)
10	189	Steve Hurt	Right wing	United States	Hill-Murray H.S. (Minn.)
11	210	Jim Steen	Center	United States	Moorhead H.S. (Minn.)
12	230	Mark Ziliotto	Left wing	Canada	Streetsville Jr. B (OHA)
