= John English (ice hockey) =

Canadian ice hockey player and businessman (born 1966)

- Born: May 13, 1966 (age 60) Toronto, Ontario, Canada
- Height: 6 ft 2 in (188 cm)
- Weight: 190 lb (86 kg; 13 st 8 lb)
- Position: Defence
- Shot: Right
- Played for: Los Angeles Kings
- NHL draft: 48th overall, 1984; Los Angeles Kings
- Playing career: 1986–1989

John English (born May 13, 1966) is a Canadian businessman and former professional ice hockey defenceman. He played 3 games in the National Hockey League for the Los Angeles Kings during the 1987–88 season.

== Early life ==
English was born in Toronto, Ontario. As a youth, he played in the 1979 Quebec International Pee-Wee Hockey Tournament with a minor ice hockey team from Toronto.

== Career ==
In three regular season games with the Los Angeles Kings, English recorded one goal and three assists. By recording four points in the three games he played in the NHL, English ranks as one of the highest points-per-game (ppg) players in NHL history.

He is currently a co-owner of Oliver's Coffee with locations around Muskoka, Ontario.

== Career statistics ==
=== Regular season and playoffs ===
| | | | Regular season | | | | | Playoffs |
| Season | Team | League | GP | G | A | Pts | PIM | GP | G | A | Pts | PIM |
|---|---|---|---|---|---|---|---|---|---|---|---|---|
| 1982–83 | St. Michael's Buzzers | MJBHL | 34 | 2 | 10 | 12 | 92 | — | — | — | — | — |
| 1983–84 | Sault Ste. Marie Greyhounds | OHL | 64 | 6 | 11 | 17 | 144 | 16 | 0 | 6 | 6 | 45 |
| 1984–85 | Sault Ste. Marie Greyhounds | OHL | 15 | 0 | 3 | 3 | 61 | — | — | — | — | — |
| 1984–85 | Hamilton Steelhawks | OHL | 41 | 2 | 22 | 24 | 105 | 17 | 3 | 3 | 6 | 43 |
| 1985–86 | Hamilton Steelhawks | OHL | 12 | 2 | 10 | 12 | 57 | — | — | — | — | — |
| 1985–86 | Ottawa 67's | OHL | 43 | 8 | 28 | 36 | 120 | — | — | — | — | — |
| 1986–87 | New Haven Nighthawks | AHL | 3 | 0 | 0 | 0 | 6 | — | — | — | — | — |
| 1986–87 | Flint Spirits | IHL | 18 | 1 | 2 | 3 | 83 | 6 | 1 | 2 | 3 | 12 |
| 1987–88 | Los Angeles Kings | NHL | 3 | 1 | 3 | 4 | 4 | 1 | 0 | 0 | 0 | 0 |
| 1987–88 | New Haven Nighthawks | AHL | 65 | 4 | 22 | 26 | 236 | — | — | — | — | — |
| 1988–89 | New Haven Nighthawks | AHL | 49 | 5 | 19 | 24 | 197 | — | — | — | — | — |
| 1988–89 | Cape Breton Oilers | AHL | 13 | 0 | 3 | 3 | 80 | — | — | — | — | — |
| NHL totals | | | 3 | 1 | 3 | 4 | 4 | 1 | 0 | 0 | 0 | 0 |
| NHL totals | | | 130 | 9 | 44 | 53 | 519 | — | — | — | — | — |
