= Rudolf Suchánek =

Czech ice hockey player

Personal information
- Nationality: Czech
- Born: 27 January 1962 (age 63) České Budějovice, Czechoslovakia

Sport
- Sport: Ice hockey

Rudolf Suchánek (born 27 January 1962) is a Czech ice hockey player. He competed in the men's tournament at the 1988 Winter Olympics.

== Career statistics ==
=== Regular season and playoffs ===
			Regular season					Playoffs
Season	Team	League	GP	G	A	Pts	PIM	GP	G	A	Pts	PIM
1979–80	TJ Motor České Budějovice	TCH U20
1979–80	TJ Motor České Budějovice	TCH	1	0	0	0	0	—	—	—	—	—
1980–81	ASD Dukla Jihlava B	CZE.2
1980–81	VTJ Mělník	CZE.3
1981–82	VTJ Mělník	CZE.2
1982–83	TJ Motor České Budějovice	TCH	44	4	4	8	24	—	—	—	—	—
1983–84	TJ Motor České Budějovice	TCH	40	4	7	11	40	—	—	—	—	—
1984–85	TJ Motor České Budějovice	TCH	43	3	4	7	48	—	—	—	—	—
1986–87	TJ Motor České Budějovice	TCH	38	9	6	15	28	—	—	—	—	—
1987–88	TJ Motor České Budějovice	TCH	41	3	26	29		—	—	—	—	—
1988–89	TJ Motor České Budějovice	TCH	33	6	17	23	60	12	1	7	8
1989–90	TJ Motor České Budějovice	TCH	27	2	3	5		—	—	—	—	—
1990–91	HC Gherdëina	ITA.2	35	22	32	54	54	—	—	—	—	—
1991–92	HC Gherdëina	ITA.2	8	2	8	10	4	—	—	—	—	—
1992–93	HC Vajgar Jindřichův Hradec	CZE.2
1993–94	HC Vajgar Jindřichův Hradec	ELH	40	7	8	15	74	—	—	—	—	—
1994–95	HC České Budějovice	ELH	44	4	12	16	30	9	1	3	4	6
1995–96	HC České Budějovice	ELH	39	1	18	19	24	10	0	1	1	4
1996–97	HC České Budějovice	ELH	51	5	9	14	30	5	0	1	1	8
1997–98	HC České Budějovice	ELH	51	5	11	16	72	—	—	—	—	—
1998–99	HC České Budějovice	ELH	49	3	15	18	42	3	0	1	1	2
1999–2000	HC České Budějovice	ELH	48	3	11	14	46	3	0	0	0	0
2000–01	HC České Budějovice	ELH	52	8	13	21	69	—	—	—	—	—
2001–02	HC České Budějovice	ELH	52	6	14	20	44	—	—	—	—	—
2002–03	HC České Budějovice	ELH	51	6	27	33	42	4	0	0	0	4
2003–04	HC České Budějovice	ELH	12	1	0	1	12	—	—	—	—	—
2003–04	HC Milevsko	CZE.3	22	7	11	18	22	4	1	1	2	0
2004–05	HC Milevsko	CZE.3	34	6	19	25	62	5	1	2	3	0
TCH totals			267	31	67	98	200	12	1	7	8	—
ELH totals			498	46	141	187	485	34	1	6	7	24

=== International ===
Year	Team	Event	GP	G	A	Pts	PIM
1988	Czechoslovakia	OG	6	1	0	1	4
Senior totals			6	1	0	1	4

"Rudolf Suchanek". Elite Prospects.
