= 1984–85 Calgary Flames season =

NHL team season

1984–85 Calgary Flames
- Division: 3rd Smythe
- Conference: 3rd Campbell
- 1984–85 record: 41–27–12
- Home record: 23–11–6
- Road record: 18–16–6
- Goals for: 363
- Goals against: 302

Team information
- General manager: Cliff Fletcher
- Coach: Bob Johnson
- Captain: Lanny McDonald, Jim Peplinski, and Doug Risebrough
- Alternate captains: None
- Arena: Olympic Saddledome
- Average attendance: 16,683

Team leaders
- Goals: Kent Nilsson and Hakan Loob (37)
- Assists: Kent Nilsson (62)
- Points: Kent Nilsson (99)
- Penalty minutes: Tim Hunter (259)
- Wins: Rejean Lemelin (30)
- Goals against average: Rejean Lemelin (3.46)

The 1984–85 Calgary Flames season was the fifth season in Calgary and 13th for the Flames franchise in the National Hockey League (NHL). It was a breakout season for the Flames, as they tied a franchise record for wins with 41, and set new team marks for points, 95, and goals for, 363. Despite the improvement, the Flames managed only a third-place finish in the Smythe Division. In the playoffs, the Flames met the second place Winnipeg Jets, where they fell three games to one.

Following the playoff disappointment, General Manager Cliff Fletcher began a series of moves to remake the team that included shipping out top scorer Kent Nilsson in a deal for a pair of second round draft picks that would eventually become Joe Nieuwendyk and Stephane Matteau.

Calgary hosted the 1985 All-Star Game at the Olympic Saddledome, a 6–4 victory by the Wales Conference over the Campbell Conference. The Flames were represented at the game by Al MacInnis and Paul Reinhart.

== Regular season ==
=== Season standings ===
Smythe Division
	GP	W	L	T	GF	GA	Pts
**Edmonton Oilers**	80	49	20	11	401	298	109
**Winnipeg Jets**	80	43	27	10	358	332	96
**Calgary Flames**	80	41	27	12	363	302	94
**Los Angeles Kings**	80	34	32	14	339	326	82
Vancouver Canucks	80	25	46	9	284	401	59

Note: GP = Games played, W = Wins, L = Losses, T = Ties, Pts = Points, GF = Goals for, GA = Goals against
Note: Teams that qualified for the playoffs are highlighted in bold.

=== Record vs. opponents ===
Smythe Division record vs. opponents

==== Vs. Campbell Conference ====
**Vs. Smythe Division**

1984–85 NHL records
Team	**CGY**	**EDM**	**LAK**	**VAN**	**WIN**	**Total**
Calgary	—	1−6−1	4−3−1	7−0−1	5−1−2	**17−10−5**
Edmonton	6−1−1	—	4−3−1	3−3−2	5−3	**18−10−4**
Los Angeles	3−4−1	3−4−1	—	4−2−2	2−4−2	**12−14−6**
Vancouver	0−7−1	3−3−2	2−4−2	—	2−5−1	**7−19−6**
Winnipeg	1−5−2	3−5	4−2−2	5−2−1	—	**13−14−5**

**Vs. Norris Division**

1984–85 NHL records
Team	**CHI**	**DET**	**MIN**	**STL**	**TOR**	**Total**
Calgary	1−2	2−1	1−0−2	0−3	3−0	**7−6−2**
Edmonton	3−0	3−0	3−0	3−0	2−0−1	**14−0−1**
Los Angeles	0−2−1	2−1	1−1−1	1−2	2−1	**6−7−2**
Vancouver	1−2	1−2	1−1−1	0−3	1−1−1	**4−9−2**
Winnipeg	1−1−1	2−0−1	2−1	0−1−2	3−0	**8−3−4**

**Vs. Wales Conference**

**Vs. Adams Division**

1984–85 NHL records
Team	**BOS**	**BUF**	**HFD**	**MTL**	**QUE**	**Total**
Calgary	3−0	0−3	3−0	2−0−1	1−1−1	**9−4−2**
Edmonton	2−1	2−0−1	2−1	1−2	3−0	**10−4−1**
Los Angeles	0−1−2	2−0−1	2−0−1	0−2−1	1−2	**5−5−5**
Vancouver	1−2	2−0−1	2−1	2−1	1−2	**8−6−1**
Winnipeg	2−1	2−1	2−1	1−2	2−1	**9−6−0**

**Vs. Patrick Division**

1984–85 NHL records
Team	**NJD**	**NYI**	**NYR**	**PHI**	**PIT**	**WSH**	**Total**
Calgary	2−0−1	2−1	2−0−1	1−2	0−2−1	1−2	**8−7−3**
Edmonton	2−1	2−0−1	1−1−1	0−3	1−1−1	1−0−2	**7−6−5**
Los Angeles	3−0	1−2	2−1	1−1−1	3−0	1−2	**11−6−1**
Vancouver	3−0	1−2	1−2	0−3	1−2	0−3	**6−12−0**
Winnipeg	2−0−1	1−2	3−0	3−0	2−1	2−1	**13−4−1**

== Schedule and results ==
1984–85 regular season
October: 7–4–0 (home: 5–1–0; road: 2–3–0)

Game	Date	Visitor	Score	Home	OT	Record	Pts
1	October 11	St. Louis	4 – 2	Calgary		0–1–0	0
2	October 13	Quebec	2 – 7	Calgary		1–1–0	2
3	October 14	Calgary	7 – 5	Vancouver		2–1–0	4
4	October 17	Winnipeg	4 – 7	Calgary		3–1–0	6
5	October 19	Boston	2 – 8	Calgary		4–1–0	8
6	October 21	Calgary	4 – 6	Edmonton		4–2–0	8
7	October 23	Hartford	4 – 9	Calgary		5–2–0	10
8	October 25	Washington	3 – 5	Calgary		6–2–0	12
9	October 27	Calgary	5 – 3	Toronto		7–2–0	14
10	October 28	Calgary	2 – 6	Buffalo		7–3–0	14
11	October 31	Calgary	3 – 4	Washington	OT	7–4–0	14

November: 7–4–1 (home: 4–2–1; road: 3–2–0)

Game	Date	Visitor	Score	Home	OT	Record	Pts
12	November 1	Calgary	9 – 5	Detroit		8–4–0	16
13	November 4	Calgary	2 – 5	St. Louis		8–5–0	16
14	November 7	Chicago	5 – 3	Calgary		8–6–0	16
15	November 10	Montreal	3 – 3	Calgary	OT	8–6–1	17
16	November 13	Detroit	4 – 5	Calgary	OT	9–6–1	19
17	November 15	Edmonton	2 – 6	Calgary		10–6–1	21
18	November 16	Calgary	6 – 2	Winnipeg		11–6–1	23
19	November 19	Calgary	4 – 5	Los Angeles		11–7–1	23
20	November 21	Vancouver	4 – 6	Calgary		12–7–1	25
21	November 23	St. Louis	3 – 1	Calgary		12–8–1	25
22	November 25	Calgary	4 – 2	Vancouver		13–8–1	27
23	November 28	NY Islanders	2 – 5	Calgary		14–8–1	29

December: 5–7–2 (home: 2–3–0; road: 3–4–2)

Game	Date	Visitor	Score	Home	OT	Record	Pts
24	December 1	Calgary	8 – 4	Minnesota		15–8–1	31
25	December 2	Calgary	6 – 8	Winnipeg		15–9–1	31
26	December 5	Calgary	4 – 4	NY Rangers	OT	15–9–2	32
27	December 7	Calgary	3 – 3	New Jersey	OT	15–9–3	33
28	December 8	Calgary	4 – 6	Pittsburgh		15–10–3	33
29	December 12	Winnipeg	2 – 9	Calgary		16–10–3	35
30	December 15	Calgary	5 – 6	Los Angeles		16–11–3	35
31	December 18	Los Angeles	6 – 3	Calgary		16–12–3	35
32	December 20	Vancouver	1 – 9	Calgary		17–12–3	37
33	December 22	Calgary	1 – 7	Edmonton		17–13–3	37
34	December 23	Calgary	5 – 4	Vancouver		18–13–3	39
35	December 26	Edmonton	6 – 5	Calgary		18–14–3	39
36	December 28	Detroit	4 – 3	Calgary		18–15–3	39
37	December 30	Calgary	5 – 2	Chicago		19–15–3	41

January: 7–4–4 (home: 4–1–3; road: 3–3–1)

Game	Date	Visitor	Score	Home	OT	Record	Pts
38	January 1	Calgary	5 – 3	Winnipeg		20–15–3	43
39	January 3	Philadelphia	3 – 4	Calgary		21–15–3	45
40	January 5	Minnesota	4 – 4	Calgary	OT	21–15–4	46
41	January 9	Los Angeles	4 – 4	Calgary	OT	21–15–5	47
42	January 11	Calgary	0 – 4	Quebec		21–16–5	47
43	January 13	Calgary	1 – 7	Philadelphia		21–17–5	47
44	January 15	Calgary	5 – 2	Hartford		22–17–5	49
45	January 17	Calgary	4 – 3	Boston		23–17–5	51
46	January 21	Calgary	3 – 3	Vancouver	OT	23–17–6	52
47	January 23	New Jersey	3 – 6	Calgary		24–17–6	54
48	January 25	Pittsburgh	6 – 6	Calgary	OT	24–17–7	55
49	January 26	Vancouver	2 – 6	Calgary		25–17–7	57
50	January 28	Calgary	3 – 4	Edmonton		25–18–7	57
51	January 29	Edmonton	4 – 2	Calgary		25–19–7	57
52	January 31	NY Rangers	2 – 7	Calgary		26–19–7	59

February: 5–6–0 (home: 2–2–0; road: 3–4–0)

Game	Date	Visitor	Score	Home	OT	Record	Pts
53	February 3	Calgary	1 – 6	Buffalo		26–20–7	59
54	February 5	Calgary	4 – 2	Montreal		27–20–7	61
55	February 6	Calgary	7 – 4	Hartford		28–20–7	63
56	February 9	Buffalo	6 – 1	Calgary		28–21–7	63
57	February 14	Washington	4 – 3	Calgary		28–22–7	63
58	February 16	Winnipeg	4 – 8	Calgary		29–22–7	65
59	February 19	Calgary	4 – 8	NY Islanders		29–23–7	65
60	February 20	Calgary	3 – 6	Pittsburgh		29–24–7	65
61	February 23	Calgary	5 – 3	New Jersey		30–24–7	67
62	February 24	Calgary	1 – 4	Philadelphia		30–25–7	67
63	February 27	NY Islanders	1 – 3	Calgary		31–25–7	69

March: 9–2–3 (home: 5–2–1; road: 4–0–2)

Game	Date	Visitor	Score	Home	OT	Record	Pts
64	March 1	Montreal	4 – 6	Calgary		32–25–7	71
65	March 3	Los Angeles	0 – 7	Calgary		33–25–7	73
66	March 5	Edmonton	5 – 3	Calgary		33–26–7	73
67	March 7	NY Rangers	5 – 11	Calgary		34–26–7	75
68	March 9	Quebec	2 – 2	Calgary	OT	34–26–8	76
69	March 13	Calgary	5 – 3	Toronto		35–26–8	78
70	March 16	Calgary	5 – 3	Boston		36–26–8	80
71	March 18	Calgary	4 – 4	Minnesota	OT	36–26–9	81
72	March 20	Toronto	4 – 7	Calgary		37–26–9	83
73	March 22	Chicago	3 – 1	Calgary		37–27–9	83
74	March 23	Calgary	4 – 3	Los Angeles		38–27–9	85
75	March 27	Calgary	4 – 2	Los Angeles		39–27–9	87
76	March 29	Los Angeles	0 – 3	Calgary		40–27–9	89
77	March 31	Calgary	4 – 4	Winnipeg	OT	40–27–10	90

April: 1–0–2 (home: 1–0–1; road: 0–0–1)

Game	Date	Visitor	Score	Home	OT	Record	Pts
78	April 3	Vancouver	3 – 5	Calgary		41–27–10	92
79	April 5	Calgary	5 – 5	Edmonton	OT	41–27–11	93
80	April 7	Winnipeg	4 – 4	Calgary	OT	41–27–12	94

Legend: Win (2 points) Loss (0 points) Tie (1 point)

== Playoffs ==
1985 Stanley Cup playoffs
Smythe Division Semifinals vs. Winnipeg Jets – Winnipeg wins 3–1

Game	Date	Visitor	Score	Home	OT	Series
1	April 10	Calgary	4 – 5	Winnipeg	OT	Winnipeg leads 1–0
2	April 11	Calgary	2 – 5	Winnipeg		Winnipeg leads 2–0
3	April 13	Winnipeg	0 – 4	Calgary		Winnipeg leads 2–1
4	April 14	Winnipeg	5 – 3	Calgary		Winnipeg wins 3–1

Legend: Win Loss

== Player statistics ==
=== Skaters ===
Note: GP = Games played; G = Goals; A = Assists; Pts = Points; PIM = Penalty minutes

		Regular season					Playoffs
Player	#	GP	G	A	Pts	PIM	GP	G	A	Pts	PIM
Kent Nilsson	14	77	37	62	99	14	3	0	1	1	0
Hakan Loob	12	78	37	35	72	14	4	3	3	6	0
Carey Wilson	33	74	24	48	72	27	4	0	0	0	0
Paul Reinhart	23	75	23	46	69	18	4	1	1	2	0
Eddy Beers	27	74	28	40	68	94	3	1	0	1	0
Al MacInnis	2	67	14	52	66	75	4	1	2	3	8
Dan Quinn	10	74	20	38	58	22	3	0	0	0	0
Richard Kromm	22	73	20	32	52	32	3	0	1	1	4
Jim Peplinski	24	80	16	29	45	111	4	1	3	4	11
Colin Patterson	11	57	22	21	43	5	4	0	0	0	5
Mike Eaves	7	56	14	29	43	10	–	–	–	–	-
Jamie Macoun	34	70	9	30	39	67	4	1	0	1	4
Lanny McDonald	9	43	19	18	37	36	1	0	0	0	0
Steve Bozek	26	54	13	22	35	6	3	1	0	1	4
Steve Tambellini	15	47	19	10	29	4	–	–	–	–	-
Steve Konroyd	3	64	3	23	26	73	4	1	4	5	2
Tim Hunter	19	71	11	11	22	259	4	0	0	0	24
Paul Baxter	4	70	5	14	19	126	4	0	1	1	18
Gino Cavallini	6	27	6	10	16	14	3	0	0	0	4
Kari Eloranta	20	65	2	11	13	39	–	–	–	–	-
Doug Risebrough	8	15	7	5	12	49	3	0	3	3	12
Joel Otto	29	17	4	8	12	30	3	2	1	3	10
Charlie Bourgeois	28	47	2	10	12	134	4	0	0	0	17
Neil Sheehy	5	31	3	4	7	109	–	–	–	–	-
Perry Berezan	21	9	3	2	5	4	2	1	0	1	4
Jim Jackson	16	10	1	4	5	0	–	–	–	–	-
Yves Courteau	25	14	1	4	5	4	–	–	–	–	-
Bruce Eakin	32	1	0	0	0	0	–	–	–	–	-
Don Edwards	1	34	0	0	0	4	–	–	–	–	-
Rejean Lemelin	31	56	0	0	0	4	4	0	0	0	0

^{†}Denotes player spent time with another team before joining Calgary. Stats reflect time with the Flames only.
^{‡}Traded mid-season.

=== Goaltenders ===
Note: GP = Games played; TOI = Time on ice (minutes); W = Wins; L = Losses; OT = Overtime/shootout losses; GA = Goals against; SO = Shutouts; GAA = Goals against average

		Regular season								Playoffs
Player	#	GP	TOI	W	L	T	GA	SO	GAA	GP	TOI	W	L	GA	SO	GAA
Rejean Lemelin	31	56	3176	30	12	10	183	1	3.46	4	248	1	3	14	1	3.39
Don Edwards	1	34	1691	11	15	2	115	1	4.08	–	–	–	–	–	–	-.--

== Transactions ==
The Flames were involved in the following transactions during the 1984–85 season.

=== Free agents ===
Player	Former team
D Gino Cavallini	Bowling Green State University (NCAA)
C Joel Otto	Bemidji State University (NCAA)

Player	New team
LW Jeff Brubaker	Edmonton Oilers
G Tim Bernhardt	Toronto Maple Leafs

== Draft picks ==
Calgary's picks at the 1984 NHL entry draft, held in Montreal.

Rnd	Pick	Player	Nationality	Position	Team (league)	NHL statistics				
Rnd	Pick	Player	Nationality	Position	Team (league)	GP	G	A	Pts	PIM
1	12	Gary Roberts	Canada	LW	Ottawa 67's (OHL)	1224	438	471	909	2560
2	33	Ken Sabourin	Canada	D	Sault Ste. Marie Greyhounds (OHL)	74	2	8	10	201
2	38	Paul Ranheim	United States	LW	University of Wisconsin–Madison (WCHA)	1013	161	199	360	288
4	75	Petr Rosol	Czechoslovakia	F	N/A					
5	96	Joel Paunio	Finland	LW	N/A					
6	117	Brett Hull	Canada	RW	University of Minnesota Duluth (WCHA)	1269	741	650	1391	458
7	138	Kevan Melrose	Canada	D	N/A					
8	159	Jiri Hrdina	Czechoslovakia	C	N/A	250	45	85	130	92
9	180	Gary Suter	United States	D	University of Wisconsin–Madison (WCHA)	1145	203	642	845	1349
10	200	Petr Rucka	Czechoslovakia	C	N/A					
11	221	Stefan Jonsson	Sweden	D	N/A					
12	241	Rudolf Suchanek	Czechoslovakia	D	N/A					

== See also ==
- 1984–85 NHL season
