= 1984–85 New York Rangers season =

NHL hockey team season

1984–85 New York Rangers
- Division: 4th Patrick
- Conference: 9th Wales
- 1984–85 record: 26–44–10
- Home record: 16–18–6
- Road record: 10–26–4
- Goals for: 295
- Goals against: 345

Team information
- General manager: Craig Patrick
- Coach: Herb Brooks; Craig Patrick
- Captain: Barry Beck
- Alternate captains: None
- Arena: Madison Square Garden

Team leaders
- Goals: Tomas Sandstrom (29)
- Assists: Reijo Ruotsalainen (45)
- Points: Reijo Ruotsalainen (73)
- Penalty minutes: George McPhee (139)
- Wins: Glen Hanlon (14)
- Goals against average: Glen Hanlon (4.18)

The 1984–85 New York Rangers season was the franchise's 59th season. In the regular season, New York had a 26–44–10 record and finished fourth in the Patrick Division. The Rangers made the NHL playoffs, where they lost to the Philadelphia Flyers in the first round, three games to none.

== Regular season ==
=== Final standings ===
Patrick Division
	GP	W	L	T	GF	GA	Pts
**Philadelphia Flyers**	80	53	20	7	348	241	113
**Washington Capitals**	80	46	25	9	322	240	101
**New York Islanders**	80	40	34	6	345	312	86
**New York Rangers**	80	26	44	10	295	345	62
New Jersey Devils	80	22	48	10	264	346	54
Pittsburgh Penguins	80	24	51	5	276	385	53

Note: GP = Games played, W = Wins, L = Losses, T = Ties, Pts = Points, GF = Goals for, GA = Goals against
Note: Teams that qualified for the playoffs are highlighted in bold.

=== Record vs. opponents ===
Patrick Division record vs. opponents

==== Vs. Wales Conference ====
**Vs. Patrick Division**

1984–85 NHL records
Team	**NJD**	**NYI**	**NYR**	**PHI**	**PIT**	**WSH**	**Total**
New Jersey	—	3−2−2	2−5	2−5	5−2	2−4−1	14−18−3
N.Y. Islanders	2−3−2	—	4−3	3−3−1	5−2	3−4	17−15−3
N.Y. Rangers	5−2	3−4	—	0−7	4−3	2−5	14−21−0
Philadelphia	5−2	3−3−1	7−0	—	5−2	5−1−1	25−8−2
Pittsburgh	2−5	2−5	3−4	2–5	—	0−6−1	9−25−1
Washington	4−2−1	4−3	5−2	1–5−1	6−0–1	—	20−13−2

**Vs. Adams Division**

1984–85 NHL records
Team	**BOS**	**BUF**	**HFD**	**MTL**	**QUE**	**Total**
New Jersey	0−3	0−3	0−3	1−1−1	1−1−1	2−11−2
N.Y. Islanders	1−2	2−1	1−1−1	1−2	0−3	5−9−1
N.Y. Rangers	0−1−2	1−1−1	0−1−2	0−2−1	1−2	2−7−6
Philadelphia	2−1	1−1−1	2−0−1	1−2	1−1−1	7−5−3
Pittsburgh	1−2	0−2−1	1−2	1−2	0−3	3−11−1
Washington	2−1	1−2	1−2	1−1−1	2−1	7−7−1

==== Vs. Campbell Conference ====
**Vs. Norris Division**

1984–85 NHL records
Team	**CHI**	**DET**	**MIN**	**STL**	**TOR**	**Total**
New Jersey	0−3	1−1−1	1−1−1	0−2−1	3−0	5−7−3
N.Y. Islanders	3−0	2−1	1−1−1	3−0	2−1	11−3−1
N.Y. Rangers	0−3	1−2	1−2	2−0−1	2−0−1	6−7−2
Philadelphia	2−1	2−0−1	3−0	3−0	2−1	12−2−1
Pittsburgh	1−2	1−1−1	1−2	1−2	2−1	6−8−1
Washington	3−0	2−1	2−0−1	2−0−1	2−0−1	11−1−3

**Vs. Smythe Division**

1984–85 NHL records
Team	**CGY**	**EDM**	**LAK**	**VAN**	**WIN**	**Total**
New Jersey	0−2−1	1−2	0−3	0−3	0−2−1	1−12−2
N.Y. Islanders	1−2	0−2−1	2−1	2−1	2−1	7−7−1
N.Y. Rangers	0−2−1	1−1−1	1−2	2−1	0−3	4−9−2
Philadelphia	2−1	3−0	1−1−1	3−0	0−3	9−5−1
Pittsburgh	2−0−1	1−1−1	0−3	2−1	1−2	6−7−2
Washington	2−1	0−1−2	2−1	3−0	1−2	8−5−2

== Schedule and results ==
1984–85 regular season
October: 4–4–1 (home: 1–2–1; road: 3–2–0)

Game	October	Opponent	Score	Record
1	11	Hartford Whalers	4 – 4 OT	0–0–1
2	13	@ Minnesota North Stars	3 – 1	0–1–1
3	14	Minnesota North Stars	3 – 1	0–2–1
4	20	@ Washington Capitals	6 – 5	1–2–1
5	21	New York Islanders	6 – 5	2–2–1
6	25	@ New Jersey Devils	11 – 2	3–2–1
7	27	@ Quebec Nordiques	5 – 2	4–2–1
8	28	Boston Bruins	6 – 4	4–3–1
9	30	@ New York Islanders	7 – 3	4–4–1

November: 4–7–1 (home: 3–4–1; road: 1–3–0)

Game	November	Opponent	Score	Record
10	3	@ Pittsburgh Penguins	7 – 5	5–4–1
11	7	Washington Capitals	4 – 3	6–4–1
12	9	New York Islanders	5 – 4 OT	7–4–1
13	11	Los Angeles Kings	4 – 2	7–5–1
14	14	@ Chicago Black Hawks	6 – 4	7–6–1
15	17	@ New York Islanders	10 – 4	7–7–1
16	18	New Jersey Devils	6 – 0	7–8–1
17	21	Buffalo Sabres	3 – 2	8–8–1
18	24	@ Quebec Nordiques	8 – 3	8–9–1
19	25	Quebec Nordiques	3 – 2 OT	8–10–1
20	28	Washington Capitals	2 – 1	8–11–1
21	30	Toronto Maple Leafs	3 – 3 OT	8–11–2

December: 4–8–3 (home: 2–4–3; road: 2–4–0)

Game	December	Opponent	Score	Record
22	1	@ Toronto Maple Leafs	4 – 1	9–11–2
23	3	Philadelphia Flyers	6 – 2	9–12–2
24	5	Calgary Flames	4 – 4 OT	9–12–3
25	7	Pittsburgh Penguins	4 – 3 OT	9–13–3
26	8	@ Philadelphia Flyers	4 – 2	9–14–3
27	10	Los Angeles Kings	4 – 2	10–14–3
28	12	Boston Bruins	3 – 3 OT	10–14–4
29	15	@ Washington Capitals	4 – 2	10–15–4
30	16	Washington Capitals	6 – 3	10–16–4
31	19	Winnipeg Jets	5 – 4	10–17–4
32	22	@ New Jersey Devils	5 – 3	11–17–4
33	23	Montreal Canadiens	3 – 3 OT	11–17–5
34	26	@ Detroit Red Wings	5 – 2	11–18–5
35	29	@ Montreal Canadiens	7 – 3	11–19–5
36	30	St. Louis Blues	6 – 2	12–19–5

January: 5–6–3 (home: 4–1–1; road: 1–5–2)

Game	January	Opponent	Score	Record
37	2	Vancouver Canucks	6 – 0	13–19–5
38	5	@ Boston Bruins	3 – 3 OT	13–19–6
39	6	New Jersey Devils	5 – 4 OT	14–19–6
40	9	@ Winnipeg Jets	6 – 5 OT	14–20–6
41	12	@ St. Louis Blues	4 – 4 OT	14–20–7
42	14	New Jersey Devils	2 – 1	14–21–7
43	16	Buffalo Sabres	2 – 2 OT	14–21–8
44	18	@ New Jersey Devils	9 – 6	15–21–8
45	19	@ Washington Capitals	7 – 1	15–22–8
46	22	@ Buffalo Sabres	3 – 2	15–23–8
47	24	Detroit Red Wings	3 – 1	16–23–8
48	26	@ Montreal Canadiens	3 – 2	16–24–8
49	27	Minnesota North Stars	3 – 2	17–24–8
50	31	@ Calgary Flames	7 – 2	17–25–8

February: 3–8–1 (home: 2–3–0; road: 1–5–1)

Game	February	Opponent	Score	Record
51	2	@ Edmonton Oilers	5 – 1	17–26–8
52	3	@ Vancouver Canucks	4 – 1	17–27–8
53	5	@ Los Angeles Kings	7 – 5	17–28–8
54	7	@ New York Islanders	7 – 5	17–29–8
55	9	@ Hartford Whalers	2 – 2 OT	17–29–9
56	10	@ Philadelphia Flyers	3 – 2	17–30–9
57	15	Edmonton Oilers	8 – 7	18–30–9
58	17	New York Islanders	9 – 3	19–30–9
59	21	Hartford Whalers	4 – 3 OT	19–31–9
60	22	@ Pittsburgh Penguins	8 – 3	20–31–9
61	25	Winnipeg Jets	12 – 5	20–32–9
62	28	Washington Capitals	5 – 4	20–33–9

March: 5–9–1 (home: 4–3–0; road: 1–6–1)

Game	March	Opponent	Score	Record
63	2	@ Pittsburgh Penguins	5 – 4	20–34–9
64	3	Pittsburgh Penguins	7 – 3	21–34–9
65	6	@ Vancouver Canucks	6 – 3	22–34–9
66	7	@ Calgary Flames	11 – 5	22–35–9
67	9	@ Edmonton Oilers	3 – 3 OT	22–35–10
68	11	Chicago Black Hawks	4 – 3 OT	22–36–10
69	13	Philadelphia Flyers	5 – 2	22–37–10
70	16	@ Pittsburgh Penguins	5 – 0	22–38–10
71	17	New Jersey Devils	7 – 3	23–38–10
72	21	@ Philadelphia Flyers	8 – 4	23–39–10
73	22	@ Detroit Red Wings	5 – 3	23–40–10
74	24	New York Islanders	5 – 2	23–41–10
75	26	Pittsburgh Penguins	5 – 4	24–41–10
76	30	@ Philadelphia Flyers	3 – 0	24–42–10
77	31	Toronto Maple Leafs	7 – 5	25–42–10

April: 1–2–0 (home: 0–1–0; road: 1–1–0)

Game	April	Opponent	Score	Record
78	2	Philadelphia Flyers	2 – 1	25–43–10
79	4	@ St. Louis Blues	5 – 4	26–43–10
80	7	@ Chicago Black Hawks	3 – 1	26–44–10

Legend: Win (2 points) Loss (0 points) Tie (1 point)

== Playoffs ==
1985 Stanley Cup playoffs
Division semifinals vs. (P1) Philadelphia Flyers – Philadelphia wins 3–0

Game	Date	Visitor	Score	Home	OT	Series
1	April 10	New York Rangers	4 – 5	Philadelphia Flyers	OT	Philadelphia leads series 1-0
2	April 11	New York Rangers	1 – 3	Philadelphia Flyers		Philadelphia leads series 2-0
3	April 13	Philadelphia Flyers	6 – 5	New York Rangers		Philadelphia wins series 3-0

Legend: Win Loss

== Player statistics ==
Skaters

Regular season
Player	GP	G	A	Pts	+/-	PIM
Reijo Ruotsalainen	80	28	45	73	-27	32
Mike Rogers	78	26	38	64	-25	24
Pierre Larouche	65	24	36	60	-17	8
Tomas Sandstrom	74	29	30	59	3	51
Anders Hedberg	64	20	31	51	-15	10
Ron Greschner	48	16	29	45	-19	42
Mark Pavelich	48	14	31	45	1	29
Peter Sundstrom	76	18	26	44	-26	34
James Patrick	75	8	28	36	-17	71
Steve Patrick^{†}	43	11	18	29	-5	63
Jan Erixon	66	7	22	29	-11	33
George McPhee	49	12	15	27	-9	139
Don Maloney	37	11	16	27	-9	32
Barry Beck	56	7	19	26	-11	65
Mike Allison	31	9	15	24	0	17
Grant Ledyard	42	8	12	20	8	53
Robbie Ftorek	48	9	10	19	-7	35
Bob Brooke	72	7	9	16	-18	79
Willie Huber	49	3	11	14	-20	55
Dave Gagner	38	6	6	12	-16	16
Chris Kontos	28	4	8	12	-12	24
Tom Laidlaw	61	1	11	12	-12	52
Nick Fotiu	46	4	7	11	-7	54
Mark Osborne	23	4	4	8	-2	33
Jim Wiemer^{†}	22	4	3	7	-10	30
Andre Dore	25	0	7	7	-2	35
Randy Heath	12	2	3	5	-1	15
Steve Richmond	34	0	5	5	-16	90
Dave Maloney^{‡}	16	2	1	3	3	10
Kelly Miller	5	0	2	2	-2	2
Mike Blaisdell	12	1	0	1	-4	11
Larry Patey	7	0	1	1	-6	12
Simo Saarinen	8	0	0	0	-4	8

Playoffs
Player	GP	G	A	Pts	PIM
Don Maloney	3	4	0	4	2
Mike Rogers	3	0	4	4	4
Mark Pavelich	3	0	3	3	2
Ron Greschner	2	0	3	3	12
Anders Hedberg	3	2	1	3	2
Tom Laidlaw	3	0	2	2	4
Grant Ledyard	3	0	2	2	4
Tomas Sandstrom	3	0	2	2	0
Reijo Ruotsalainen	3	2	0	2	6
Willie Huber	2	1	0	1	2
Barry Beck	3	0	1	1	11
George McPhee	3	1	0	1	7
Larry Patey	1	0	0	0	0
Kelly Miller	3	0	0	0	2
Jim Wiemer	1	0	0	0	0
Mark Osborne	3	0	0	0	4
Bob Brooke	3	0	0	0	8
Jan Erixon	2	0	0	0	2
Steve Patrick	1	0	0	0	0
James Patrick	3	0	0	0	4
Peter Sundstrom	3	0	0	0	0

Goaltenders

Regular season
Player	GP	TOI	W	L	T	GA	GAA	SA	SV%	SO
Glen Hanlon	44	2510	14	20	7	175	4.18	1614	.878	0
John Vanbiesbrouck	42	2358	12	24	3	166	4.22	1512	.877	1

Playoffs
Player	GP	TOI	W	L	GA	GAA	SA	SV%	SO
Glen Hanlon	3	168	0	3	14	5.00	99	.859	0
John Vanbiesbrouck	1	20	0	0	0	0.00	12	1.000	0

^{†}Denotes player spent time with another team before joining Rangers. Stats reflect time with Rangers only.
^{‡}Traded mid-season. Stats reflect time with Rangers only.

Note:

Pos = Position;GP = Games played; G = Goals; A = Assists; Pts = Points; PIM = Penalty minutes; +/- = Plus/minus; PPG = Power-play goals; SHG = Short-handed goals; GWG = Game-winning goals
Pos = Position;GP = Games played; Min, TOI = Minutes played; W = Wins; L = Losses; T,T/OT = Ties; OTL = Overtime losses; GA = Goals-against; GAA = Goals-against average; SO = Shutouts; SA = Shots against; SV = Shots saved;SV% = Save percentage;

== Draft picks ==
New York's picks at the 1984 NHL entry draft in Montreal, Canada at the Montreal Forum.

Round	#	Player	Position	Nationality	College/Junior/Club team (League)
1	14	Terry Carkner	D	Canada	Peterborough Petes (OHL)
2	35	Raimo Helminen	C	Finland	Ilves Tampere (FNL)
4	77	Paul Broten	C	United States	Roseau H.S. (Minnesota)
5	98	Clark Donatelli	LW	United States	Stratford Jr. A (OHA)
6	119	Kjell Samuelsson	D	Sweden	Leksands IF (Allsvenskan)
7	140	Thomas Hussey	LW	Canada	St. Andrew's College (Ontario)
8	161	Brian Nelson	C	United States	Willmar H.S. (Minnesota)
9	182	Ville Kentala	LW	Finland	HIFK (FNL)
9	188	Heinz Ehlers	C	Denmark	Leksands IF (Allsvenskan)
10	202	Kevin Miller	C	United States	Redford Royals (NAJHL)
11	223	Tom Lorentz	C	United States	Brady H.S. (Minnesota)
12	243	Scott Brower	G	Canada	Lloydminster Lancers (SJHL)

== Farm teams ==
- New Haven Nighthawks – American Hockey League

== See also ==
- 1984–85 NHL season
