= 1986–87 New York Islanders season =

NHL hockey team season

1986–87 New York Islanders
- Division: 3rd Patrick
- Conference: 6th Wales
- 1986–87 record: 35–33–12
- Home record: 20–15–5
- Road record: 15–18–7
- Goals for: 279
- Goals against: 281

Team information
- General manager: Bill Torrey
- Coach: Terry Simpson
- Captain: Denis Potvin
- Alternate captains: Brent Sutter; Bryan Trottier
- Arena: Nassau Coliseum

Team leaders
- Goals: Mike Bossy, Pat LaFontaine (38)
- Assists: Bryan Trottier (64)
- Points: Bryan Trottier (87)
- Penalty minutes: Brian Curran (356)
- Wins: Kelly Hrudey (21)
- Goals against average: Kelly Hrudey (3.30)

The 1986–87 New York Islanders season was the 15th season for the franchise in the National Hockey League (NHL).

== Offseason ==
=== NHL draft ===
Round	Pick	Player	Nationality	College/junior/club team
1	17	Tom Fitzgerald	United States	Austin Prep (Massachusetts)
2	38	Dennis Vaske	United States	Plymouth Armstrong H.S. (Minn.)
3	59	Bill Berg	Canada	Toronto Marlboros (OHL)
4	80	Shawn Byram	Canada	Regina Pats (WHL)
5	101	Dean Sexsmith	Canada	Brandon Wheat Kings (WHL)
5	104	Todd McLellan	Canada	Saskatoon Blades (WHL)
6	122	Tony Schmalzbauer	United States	Hill-Murray School (USHS-MN)
7	138	Will Andersen	Canada	Victoria Cougars (WHL)
7	143	Rich Pilon	Canada	Prince Albert Raiders (WHL)
8	164	Peter Harris	United States	Haverhill High School (MIAA)
9	185	Jeff Jablonski	United States	London Diamonds (WOJBHL)
10	206	Kerry Clark	Canada	Saskatoon Blades (WHL)
11	227	Dan Beaudette	United States	Saint Thomas Academy (USHS-MN)
12	248	Paul Thompson	Canada	Northern Manitoba AAA All-Stars (MAAAMHL)
S2	20	Gary Kruzich	United States	Bowling Green State University (CCHA)

== Regular season ==
=== Season standings ===
Patrick Division
	GP	W	L	T	GF	GA	Pts
**Philadelphia Flyers**	80	46	26	8	310	245	100
**Washington Capitals**	80	38	32	10	285	278	86
**New York Islanders**	80	35	33	12	279	281	82
**New York Rangers**	80	34	38	8	307	323	76
Pittsburgh Penguins	80	30	38	12	297	290	72
New Jersey Devils	80	29	45	6	293	368	64

Note: GP = Games played, W = Wins, L = Losses, T = Ties, Pts = Points, GF = Goals for, GA = Goals against
Note: Teams that qualified for the playoffs are highlighted in bold.

=== Record vs. opponents ===
Patrick Division record vs. opponents

==== Vs. Wales Conference ====
**Vs. Patrick Division**

1986–87 NHL records
Team	**NJD**	**NYI**	**NYR**	**PHI**	**PIT**	**WSH**	**Total**
New Jersey	—	2–5	4–3	2–4–1	4–3	1–6	13–21–1
N.Y. Islanders	5–2	—	3–3–1	3–4	5–0–2	2–3–2	18–12–2
N.Y. Rangers	3–4	3–3–1	—	4–3	3–2–2	4–3	17–15–3
Philadelphia	4–2–1	4–3	3–4	—	4–1–2	5–1–1	20–11–4
Pittsburgh	3–4	0–5–2	2–3–2	1–4–2	—	4–3	10–19–6
Washington	6–1	3–2–2	3–4	1–5–1	3–4	—	16–16–3

**Vs. Adams Division**

1986–87 NHL records
Team	**BOS**	**BUF**	**HFD**	**MTL**	**QUE**	**Total**
New Jersey	1–1–1	1–2	1–1–1	1–2	0–1–2	4–7–4
N.Y. Islanders	0–2–1	1–1–1	1–2	1–1–1	2–1	5–7–3
N.Y. Rangers	2–1	2–1	0–3	0–2–1	2–1	6–8–1
Philadelphia	2–1	2–1	1–2	2–0–1	2–0–1	9–4–2
Pittsburgh	1–2	2–0–1	0–3	1–1–1	3–0	7–6–2
Washington	1–1–1	1–2	1–2	3–0	0–2–1	6–7–2

==== Vs. Campbell Conference ====
**Vs. Norris Division**

1986–87 NHL records
Team	**CHI**	**DET**	**MIN**	**STL**	**TOR**	**Total**
New Jersey	1–2	2–1	1–2	2–1	1–2	7–8–0
N.Y. Islanders	1–2	2–1	3–0	1–1–1	2–1	9–5–1
N.Y. Rangers	1–1–1	1–2	1–1–1	1–2	1–1–1	5–7–3
Philadelphia	2–0–1	2–1	1–2	3–0	1–1–1	9–4–2
Pittsburgh	2–1	1–2	3–0	1–0–2	1–2	8–5–2
Washington	1–1–1	2–0–1	2–0–1	2–0–1	2–1	9–2–4

**Vs. Smythe Division**

1986–87 NHL records
Team	**CGY**	**EDM**	**LAK**	**VAN**	**WIN**	**Total**
New Jersey	1–2	1–2	1–2	2–0–1	0–3	5–9–1
N.Y. Islanders	0–2–1	0–2–1	1–2	1–2	1–1–1	3–9–2
N.Y. Rangers	1–2	0–3	2–0–1	2–1	1–2	6–8–1
Philadelphia	1–2	2–1	1–2	2–1	2–1	8–7–0
Pittsburgh	1–2	1–2	1–2	1–0–2	1–2	5–8–2
Washington	1–2	2–1	0–3	3–0	1–1–1	7–7–1

== Schedule and results ==
1986–87 regular season
October

Game	Result	Date	Score	Opponent	Record
1	L	October 9, 1986	2–3	@ Chicago Blackhawks (1986–87)	0–1–0
2	L	October 11, 1986	4–5	@ Los Angeles Kings (1986–87)	0–2–0
3	W	October 16, 1986	7–4	Washington Capitals (1986–87)	1–2–0
4	L	October 18, 1986	2–3	New York Rangers (1986–87)	1–3–0
5	T	October 19, 1986	2–2 OT	@ New York Rangers (1986–87)	1–3–1
6	W	October 21, 1986	6–3	New Jersey Devils (1986–87)	2–3–1
7	W	October 25, 1986	4–3	Los Angeles Kings (1986–87)	3–3–1
8	W	October 28, 1986	2–1	Philadelphia Flyers (1986–87)	4–3–1
9	L	October 30, 1986	6–7 OT	@ New Jersey Devils (1986–87)	4–4–1

November

Game	Result	Date	Score	Opponent	Record
10	W	November 1, 1986	7–4	Winnipeg Jets (1986–87)	5–4–1
11	W	November 4, 1986	7–1	Washington Capitals (1986–87)	6–4–1
12	L	November 5, 1986	2–3	@ Hartford Whalers (1986–87)	6–5–1
13	W	November 8, 1986	2–1 OT	Detroit Red Wings (1986–87)	7–5–1
14	W	November 9, 1986	4–3	@ Buffalo Sabres (1986–87)	8–5–1
15	L	November 11, 1986	2–3 OT	Edmonton Oilers (1986–87)	8–6–1
16	W	November 15, 1986	7–3	@ Minnesota North Stars (1986–87)	9–6–1
17	L	November 16, 1986	1–3	@ Winnipeg Jets (1986–87)	9–7–1
18	W	November 18, 1986	4–3 OT	@ Quebec Nordiques (1986–87)	10–7–1
19	W	November 20, 1986	6–4	Toronto Maple Leafs (1986–87)	11–7–1
20	L	November 22, 1986	3–6	Hartford Whalers (1986–87)	11–8–1
21	W	November 25, 1986	5–1	Pittsburgh Penguins (1986–87)	12–8–1
22	W	November 26, 1986	3–2	@ Pittsburgh Penguins (1986–87)	13–8–1
23	L	November 29, 1986	5–6	Philadelphia Flyers (1986–87)	13–9–1

December

Game	Result	Date	Score	Opponent	Record
24	T	December 2, 1986	3–3 OT	@ Calgary Flames (1986–87)	13–9–2
25	L	December 3, 1986	1–7	@ Edmonton Oilers (1986–87)	13–10–2
26	W	December 5, 1986	4–3	@ Vancouver Canucks (1986–87)	14–10–2
27	L	December 7, 1986	1–3	@ Boston Bruins (1986–87)	14–11–2
28	L	December 9, 1986	2–7	Los Angeles Kings (1986–87)	14–12–2
29	W	December 11, 1986	8–4	@ New Jersey Devils (1986–87)	15–12–2
30	W	December 13, 1986	4–2	New Jersey Devils (1986–87)	16–12–2
31	W	December 16, 1986	4–2	Minnesota North Stars (1986–87)	17–12–2
32	L	December 18, 1986	4–9	@ Philadelphia Flyers (1986–87)	17–13–2
33	W	December 20, 1986	5–2	New York Rangers (1986–87)	18–13–2
34	W	December 23, 1986	4–3 OT	Pittsburgh Penguins (1986–87)	19–13–2
35	L	December 26, 1986	1–2	@ Washington Capitals (1986–87)	19–14–2
36	T	December 27, 1986	3–3 OT	@ Pittsburgh Penguins (1986–87)	19–14–3
37	L	December 30, 1986	3–5	Chicago Blackhawks (1986–87)	19–15–3
38	L	December 31, 1986	3–4 OT	@ New York Rangers (1986–87)	19–16–3

January

Game	Result	Date	Score	Opponent	Record
39	L	January 3, 1987	4–5	Boston Bruins (1986–87)	19–17–3
40	W	January 6, 1987	5–3	Minnesota North Stars (1986–87)	20–17–3
41	W	January 9, 1987	2–1	@ New York Rangers (1986–87)	21–17–3
42	W	January 10, 1987	3–2	Toronto Maple Leafs (1986–87)	22–17–3
43	T	January 13, 1987	3–3 OT	Pittsburgh Penguins (1986–87)	22–17–4
44	L	January 15, 1987	2–3	Washington Capitals (1986–87)	22–18–4
45	L	January 17, 1987	2–4	Philadelphia Flyers (1986–87)	22–19–4
46	W	January 18, 1987	3–1	@ Philadelphia Flyers (1986–87)	23–19–4
47	L	January 20, 1987	1–3	Calgary Flames (1986–87)	23–20–4
48	L	January 21, 1987	5–8	@ Detroit Red Wings (1986–87)	23–21–4
49	W	January 24, 1987	2–1 OT	@ Quebec Nordiques (1986–87)	24–21–4
50	T	January 27, 1987	2–2 OT	Winnipeg Jets (1986–87)	24–21–5
51	T	January 30, 1987	3–3 OT	@ Washington Capitals (1986–87)	24–21–6
52	W	January 31, 1987	4–2	Hartford Whalers (1986–87)	25–21–6

February

Game	Result	Date	Score	Opponent	Record
53	L	February 4, 1987	1–4	@ Vancouver Canucks (1986–87)	25–22–6
54	T	February 6, 1987	3–3 OT	@ Edmonton Oilers (1986–87)	25–22–7
55	L	February 7, 1987	1–4	@ Calgary Flames (1986–87)	25–23–7
56	L	February 14, 1987	1–5	Buffalo Sabres (1986–87)	25–24–7
57	L	February 17, 1987	2–3	Philadelphia Flyers (1986–87)	25–25–7
58	T	February 18, 1987	1–1 OT	@ Montreal Canadiens (1986–87)	25–25–8
59	W	February 21, 1987	6–5	Montreal Canadiens (1986–87)	26–25–8
60	W	February 22, 1987	7–0	@ New Jersey Devils (1986–87)	27–25–8
61	L	February 24, 1987	2–3	@ St. Louis Blues (1986–87)	27–26–8
62	W	February 26, 1987	5–4	Pittsburgh Penguins (1986–87)	28–26–8
63	T	February 28, 1987	3–3 OT	St. Louis Blues (1986–87)	28–26–9

March

Game	Result	Date	Score	Opponent	Record
64	T	March 3, 1987	4–4 OT	Boston Bruins (1986–87)	28–26–10
65	L	March 4, 1987	5–7	@ New York Rangers (1986–87)	28–27–10
66	L	March 7, 1987	2–7	@ Toronto Maple Leafs (1986–87)	28–28–10
67	W	March 8, 1987	6–5	@ Chicago Blackhawks (1986–87)	29–28–10
68	W	March 10, 1987	6–3	@ Pittsburgh Penguins (1986–87)	30–28–10
69	L	March 13, 1987	1–4	@ New Jersey Devils (1986–87)	30–29–10
70	W	March 14, 1987	7–6 OT	New Jersey Devils (1986–87)	31–29–10
71	L	March 16, 1987	0–3	@ Montreal Canadiens (1986–87)	31–30–10
72	W	March 19, 1987	3–2	@ Detroit Red Wings (1986–87)	32–30–10
73	W	March 21, 1987	4–3	New York Rangers (1986–87)	33–30–10
74	L	March 24, 1987	1–3	Washington Capitals (1986–87)	33–31–10
75	L	March 26, 1987	2–5	Vancouver Canucks (1986–87)	33–32–10
76	T	March 27, 1987	2–2 OT	@ Washington Capitals (1986–87)	33–32–11
77	W	March 31, 1987	4–3	@ St. Louis Blues (1986–87)	34–32–11

April

Game	Result	Date	Score	Opponent	Record
78	L	April 2, 1987	1–4	Quebec Nordiques (1986–87)	34–33–11
79	T	April 4, 1987	6–6 OT	Buffalo Sabres (1986–87)	34–33–12
80	W	April 5, 1987	9–5	@ Philadelphia Flyers (1986–87)	35–33–12

Legend: Win (2 points) Loss (0 points) Tie (1 point)

== Playoffs ==
=== Round 1: New York Islanders (3) vs. Washington Capitals (2) ===
The Easter Epic is the nickname given to a National Hockey League Stanley Cup Playoff game between the New York Islanders and Washington Capitals, played April 18–19, 1987, at the Capital Centre in Landover, Maryland. It is so named because the game started on Saturday evening but did not finish until the early hours of Easter Sunday where Pat Lafontaine scored the overtime series winning goal.

April 8	New York Islanders	3–4	Washington Capitals	Capital Centre

April 9	New York Islanders	3–1	Washington Capitals	Capital Centre

April 11	Washington Capitals	2–0	New York Islanders	Nassau Coliseum

April 12	Washington Capitals	4–1	New York Islanders	Nassau Coliseum

April 14	New York Islanders	4–2	Washington Capitals	Capital Centre

April 16	Washington Capitals	4–5	New York Islanders	Nassau Coliseum

April 18	New York Islanders	3–2	4OT	Washington Capitals	Capital Centre

New York won series 4–3

=== Round 2: New York Islanders (3) vs. Philadelphia Flyers (1) ===
April 20	New York Islanders	2–4	Philadelphia Flyers	Spectrum

April 22	New York Islanders	2–1	Philadelphia Flyers	Spectrum

April 24	Philadelphia Flyers	4–1	New York Islanders	Nassau Coliseum

April 26	Philadelphia Flyers	6–4	New York Islanders	Nassau Coliseum

April 28	New York Islanders	2–1	Philadelphia Flyers	Spectrum

April 30	Philadelphia Flyers	2–4	New York Islanders	Nassau Coliseum

May 2	New York Islanders	1–5	Philadelphia Flyers	Spectrum

Philadelphia won series 4–3

== Player statistics ==
Regular season
Scoring

Player	Pos	GP	G	A	Pts	PIM	+/-	PPG	SHG	GWG
Bryan Trottier	C	80	23	64	87	50	3	13	0	1
Mike Bossy	RW	63	38	37	75	33	-7	8	1	5
Pat LaFontaine	C	80	38	32	70	70	-10	19	1	6
Brent Sutter	C	69	27	36	63	73	23	6	3	8
Mikko Makela	RW	80	24	33	57	24	3	11	0	3
Pat Flatley	RW	63	16	35	51	81	17	6	0	4
Denis Potvin	D	58	12	30	42	70	-6	8	0	1
Duane Sutter	RW	80	14	17	31	169	1	1	0	1
Tomas Jonsson	D	47	6	25	31	36	-8	1	1	0
Richard Kromm	LW	70	12	17	29	20	2	0	0	0
Ken Leiter	D	74	9	20	29	30	2	4	0	0
Randy Boyd	D	30	7	17	24	37	0	3	1	0
Brad Lauer	LW	61	7	14	21	65	0	1	0	1
Steve Konroyd	D	72	5	16	21	70	-4	3	0	0
Bob Bassen	C	77	7	10	17	89	-17	0	0	1
Alan Kerr	RW	72	7	10	17	175	-10	0	1	1
Gord Dineen	D	71	4	10	14	110	-8	0	0	0
Greg Gilbert	LW	51	6	7	13	26	-12	0	0	0
Ken Morrow	D	64	3	8	11	32	7	0	0	0
Ari Haanpaa	LW	41	6	4	10	17	8	0	0	3
Brian Curran	D	68	0	10	10	356	3	0	0	0
Dale Henry	LW	19	3	3	6	46	2	0	0	0
Gerald Diduck	D	30	2	3	5	67	-3	0	0	0
Neal Coulter	RW	9	2	1	3	7	-2	0	0	0
Billy Smith	G	40	0	2	2	37	0	0	0	0
Randy Wood	LW/C	6	1	0	1	4	-1	0	0	0
Mark Hamway	RW	2	0	1	1	0	-1	0	0	0
Kelly Hrudey	G	46	0	1	1	37	0	0	0	0
Derek King	LW	2	0	0	0	0	0	0	0	0

Goaltending

Player	MIN	GP	W	L	T	GA	GAA	SO	SA	SV	SV%
Kelly Hrudey	2634	46	21	15	7	145	3.30	0	1219	1074	.881
Billy Smith	2252	40	14	18	5	132	3.52	1	1007	875	.869
Team:	4886	80	35	33	12	277	3.40	1	2226	1949	.876

Playoffs
Scoring

Player	Pos	GP	G	A	Pts	PIM	+/-	PPG	SHG	GWG
Bryan Trottier	C	14	8	5	13	12	-6	3	0	2
Pat LaFontaine	C	14	5	7	12	10	-6	1	0	2
Mikko Makela	RW	11	2	4	6	8	-4	1	0	1
Pat Flatley	RW	11	3	2	5	6	-2	0	0	0
Mike Bossy	RW	6	2	3	5	0	-2	2	0	0
Tomas Jonsson	D	10	1	4	5	6	2	1	0	0
Alan Kerr	RW	14	1	4	5	25	-1	0	0	0
Steve Konroyd	D	14	1	4	5	10	4	0	0	0
Ken Leiter	D	11	0	5	5	6	-2	0	0	0
Greg Gilbert	LW	10	2	2	4	6	3	0	0	1
Denis Potvin	D	10	2	2	4	21	-7	1	0	0
Richard Kromm	LW	14	1	3	4	4	0	0	0	0
Ken Morrow	D	13	1	3	4	2	-6	0	0	0
Randy Wood	LW/C	13	1	3	4	14	0	0	0	1
Gord Dineen	D	7	0	4	4	4	4	0	0	0
Bob Bassen	C	14	1	2	3	21	2	0	0	0
Brad Lauer	LW	6	2	0	2	4	1	0	0	0
Brent Sutter	C	5	1	0	1	4	-4	1	0	0
Duane Sutter	RW	14	1	0	1	26	-3	0	0	0
Randy Boyd	D	4	0	1	1	6	-2	0	0	0
Brad Dalgarno	RW	1	0	1	1	0	0	0	0	0
Gerald Diduck	D	14	0	1	1	35	-7	0	0	0
Brian Curran	D	8	0	0	0	51	-4	0	0	0
Ari Haanpaa	LW	6	0	0	0	10	-1	0	0	0
Dale Henry	LW	8	0	0	0	2	-5	0	0	0
Kelly Hrudey	G	14	0	0	0	0	0	0	0	0
Billy Smith	G	2	0	0	0	0	0	0	0	0

Goaltending

Player	MIN	GP	W	L	GA	GAA	SO	SA	SV	SV%
Kelly Hrudey	842	14	7	7	38	2.71	0	464	426	.918
Billy Smith	67	2	0	0	1	0.90	0	22	21	.955
Team:	909	14	7	7	39	2.57	0	486	447	.920

Note: Pos = Position; GP = Games played; G = Goals; A = Assists; Pts = Points; +/- = plus/minus; PIM = Penalty minutes; PPG = Power-play goals; SHG = Short-handed goals; GWG = Game-winning goals
MIN = Minutes played; W = Wins; L = Losses; T = Ties; GA = Goals-against; GAA = Goals-against average; SO = Shutouts; SA = Shots against; SV = Shots saved; SV% = Save percentage;
