= 1986–87 Vancouver Canucks season =

17th season in franchise history

1986–87 Vancouver Canucks
- Division: 5th Smythe
- Conference: 10th Campbell
- 1986–87 record: 29–43–8
- Home record: 17–19–4
- Road record: 12–24–4
- Goals for: 282
- Goals against: 314

Team information
- General manager: Jack Gordon
- Coach: Tom Watt
- Captain: Stan Smyl
- Alternate captains: Brent Peterson; Doug Lidster; Barry Pederson
- Arena: Pacific Coliseum
- Average attendance: 10,406

Team leaders
- Goals: Tony Tanti (41)
- Assists: Barry Pederson (52)
- Points: Tony Tanti (79)
- Penalty minutes: Garth Butcher (207)
- Wins: Richard Brodeur (20)
- Goals against average: Richard Brodeur (3.59)

The 1986–87 Vancouver Canucks season was the team's 17th in the National Hockey League (NHL). The Canucks did not qualify for the playoffs.

== Regular season ==
=== Final standings ===
Smythe Division
	GP	W	L	T	GF	GA	Pts
**Edmonton Oilers**	80	50	24	6	372	284	106
**Calgary Flames**	80	46	31	3	318	289	95
**Winnipeg Jets**	80	40	32	8	279	271	88
**Los Angeles Kings**	80	31	41	8	318	341	70
Vancouver Canucks	80	29	43	8	282	314	66

Note: GP = Games played, W = Wins, L = Losses, T = Ties, Pts = Points, GF = Goals for, GA = Goals against
Note: Teams that qualified for the playoffs are highlighted in bold.

=== Record vs. opponents ===
Smythe Division record vs. opponents

==== Vs. Campbell Conference ====
**Vs. Smythe Division**

1986–87 NHL records
Team	**CGY**	**EDM**	**LAK**	**VAN**	**WIN**	**Total**
Calgary	—	6–1–1	5–3	4–4	2–6	**17–14–1**
Edmonton	1–6–1	—	4–2–2	7–0–1	5–3	**17–11–4**
Los Angeles	3–5	2–4–2	—	2–5–1	3–5	**10–19–3**
Vancouver	4–4	0–7–1	5–2–1	—	3–5	**12–18–2**
Winnipeg	6–2	3–5	5–3	5–3	—	**19–13–0**

**Vs. Norris Division**

1986–87 NHL records
Team	**CHI**	**DET**	**MIN**	**STL**	**TOR**	**Total**
Calgary	3–0	1–2	1–1–1	1–2	2–1	**8–6–1**
Edmonton	1–2	3–0	2–0–1	3–0	2–1	**11–3–1**
Los Angeles	1–1–1	3–0	0–2–1	1–1–1	1–1–1	**6–5–4**
Vancouver	1–1–1	1–2	0–3	2–0–1	2–1	**6–7–2**
Winnipeg	0–3	1–1–1	2–1	1–0–2	1–2	**5–7–3**

**Vs. Wales Conference**

**Vs. Adams Division**

1986–87 NHL records
Team	**BOS**	**BUF**	**HFD**	**MTL**	**QUE**	**Total**
Calgary	1–2	3–0	2–1	1–2	2–1	**9–6–0**
Edmonton	1–2	2–1	2–1	3–0	3–0	**11–4–0**
Los Angeles	1–2	1–2	2–1	0–3	0–3	**4–11–0**
Vancouver	1–2	3–0	0–2–1	2–1	1–2	**7–7–1**
Winnipeg	1–2	2–1	1–1–1	1–2	1–0–2	**6–6–3**

**Vs. Patrick Division**

1986–87 NHL records
Team	**NJD**	**NYI**	**NYR**	**PHI**	**PIT**	**WSH**	**Total**
Calgary	2–1	2–0–1	2–1	2–1	2–1	2–1	**12–5–1**
Edmonton	2–1	2–0–1	3–0	1–2	2–1	1–2	**11–6–1**
Los Angeles	2–1	2–1	0–2–1	2–1	2–1	3–0	**11–6–1**
Vancouver	0–2–1	2–1	1–2	1–2	0–1–2	0–3	**4–11–3**
Winnipeg	3–0	1–1–1	2–1	1–2	2–1	1–1–1	**10–6–2**

== Schedule and results ==
=== Preseason ===
The Canucks released their pre-season schedule on July 5, 1986.

1986 preseason
Preseason: 2–5–0 (home: 2–3–0; road: 0–2–0)

Game	Date	Visitor	Score	Home	Decision	Attendance	Record	Recap
1^{[a]}^{[b]}	September 20	Vancouver	4–2	Los Angeles	-	—	–	
2^{[b]}	September 20	Vancouver	4–5	Los Angeles	Young	4,132	0–1–0	
3^{[a]}^{[c]}	September 21	Los Angeles	2–7	Vancouver	-	—	–	
4^{[c]}	September 21	Los Angeles	5–2	Vancouver	Gamble	1,750	0–2–0	
5^{[d]}	September 23	Los Angeles	5–6	Vancouver	Caprice	3,154	1–2–0	
6	September 26	Vancouver	3–5	Winnipeg	Caprice	9,184	1–3–0	
7	September 27	Calgary	8–6	Vancouver	Young	7,104	1–4–0	
8	September 28	NY Rangers	6–5	Vancouver	Brodeur	7,175	1–5–0	
9	October 5	Winnipeg	1–5	Vancouver	Young	8,696	2–5–0	

Legend: Win (2 points) Loss (0 points) Tie (1 point)
Notes:
^{a} Game was played by the rookie squad.
^{b} Game was played at Memorial Arena in Victoria.
^{c} Game was played at Cowichan Community Centre in Duncan.
^{d} Game was played at Frank Crane Arena in Nanaimo.

=== Regular season ===
The Canucks released their regular season schedule on July 17, 1986.

1986–87 regular season
October

Game	Result	Date	Score	Opponent	Record
1	W	October 11, 1986	4–3	St. Louis Blues (1986–87)	1–0–0
2	L	October 13, 1986	1–7	Quebec Nordiques (1986–87)	1–1–0
3	L	October 15, 1986	2–3	@ New Jersey Devils (1986–87)	1–2–0
4	L	October 16, 1986	2–6	@ Philadelphia Flyers (1986–87)	1–3–0
5	L	October 18, 1986	1–4	@ Minnesota North Stars (1986–87)	1–4–0
6	W	October 22, 1986	5–1	Boston Bruins (1986–87)	2–4–0
7	T	October 24, 1986	2–2 OT	Chicago Blackhawks (1986–87)	2–4–1
8	L	October 26, 1986	2–3	@ Edmonton Oilers (1986–87)	2–5–1
9	L	October 28, 1986	2–5	Washington Capitals (1986–87)	2–6–1
10	L	October 31, 1986	2–6	Edmonton Oilers (1986–87)	2–7–1

November

Game	Result	Date	Score	Opponent	Record
11	L	November 2, 1986	3–5	Montreal Canadiens (1986–87)	2–8–1
12	T	November 4, 1986	2–2 OT	@ Pittsburgh Penguins (1986–87)	2–8–2
13	L	November 5, 1986	2–3	@ Washington Capitals (1986–87)	2–9–2
14	W	November 7, 1986	7–6	@ Buffalo Sabres (1986–87)	3–9–2
15	W	November 8, 1986	5–3	@ Toronto Maple Leafs (1986–87)	4–9–2
16	L	November 11, 1986	3–5	@ Calgary Flames (1986–87)	4–10–2
17	L	November 12, 1986	3–4	Hartford Whalers (1986–87)	4–11–2
18	L	November 14, 1986	2–3	Winnipeg Jets (1986–87)	4–12–2
19	W	November 18, 1986	5–0	Calgary Flames (1986–87)	5–12–2
20	L	November 21, 1986	5–8	New York Rangers (1986–87)	5–13–2
21	L	November 22, 1986	2–5	@ Edmonton Oilers (1986–87)	5–14–2
22	W	November 25, 1986	11–5	Los Angeles Kings (1986–87)	6–14–2
23	W	November 26, 1986	5–3	@ Los Angeles Kings (1986–87)	7–14–2
24	L	November 29, 1986	3–6	Winnipeg Jets (1986–87)	7–15–2

December

Game	Result	Date	Score	Opponent	Record
25	L	December 2, 1986	2–4	Chicago Blackhawks (1986–87)	7–16–2
26	L	December 5, 1986	3–4	New York Islanders (1986–87)	7–17–2
27	W	December 7, 1986	3–1	@ Winnipeg Jets (1986–87)	8–17–2
28	L	December 9, 1986	3–6	@ Philadelphia Flyers (1986–87)	8–18–2
29	L	December 11, 1986	2–4	@ Boston Bruins (1986–87)	8–19–2
30	T	December 13, 1986	2–2 OT	@ Hartford Whalers (1986–87)	8–19–3
31	W	December 14, 1986	7–3	@ Chicago Blackhawks (1986–87)	9–19–3
32	L	December 17, 1986	4–5	Detroit Red Wings (1986–87)	9–20–3
33	L	December 19, 1986	2–4	@ Edmonton Oilers (1986–87)	9–21–3
34	L	December 20, 1986	3–5	Calgary Flames (1986–87)	9–22–3
35	W	December 23, 1986	6–4	Los Angeles Kings (1986–87)	10–22–3
36	W	December 27, 1986	4–2	Philadelphia Flyers (1986–87)	11–22–3
37	L	December 30, 1986	3–7	Edmonton Oilers (1986–87)	11–23–3

January

Game	Result	Date	Score	Opponent	Record
38	T	January 2, 1987	3–3 OT	Los Angeles Kings (1986–87)	11–23–4
39	L	January 4, 1987	2–4	@ Winnipeg Jets (1986–87)	11–24–4
40	L	January 6, 1987	2–3	@ Quebec Nordiques (1986–87)	11–25–4
41	W	January 7, 1987	3–2 OT	@ Montreal Canadiens (1986–87)	12–25–4
42	T	January 10, 1987	2–2 OT	@ New Jersey Devils (1986–87)	12–25–5
43	L	January 11, 1987	3–8	@ New York Rangers (1986–87)	12–26–5
44	L	January 14, 1987	0–4	@ Los Angeles Kings (1986–87)	12–27–5
45	W	January 16, 1987	9–5	Calgary Flames (1986–87)	13–27–5
46	W	January 17, 1987	4–3	@ Calgary Flames (1986–87)	14–27–5
47	L	January 19, 1987	4–5	@ Winnipeg Jets (1986–87)	14–28–5
48	W	January 21, 1987	5–3	New York Rangers (1986–87)	15–28–5
49	L	January 23, 1987	0–6	Pittsburgh Penguins (1986–87)	15–29–5
50	T	January 27, 1987	4–4 OT	Edmonton Oilers (1986–87)	15–29–6
51	L	January 28, 1987	3–7	@ Edmonton Oilers (1986–87)	15–30–6
52	L	January 30, 1987	3–4	New Jersey Devils (1986–87)	15–31–6

February

Game	Result	Date	Score	Opponent	Record
53	L	February 1, 1987	3–4	Minnesota North Stars (1986–87)	15–32–6
54	W	February 3, 1987	4–2	@ Calgary Flames (1986–87)	16–32–6
55	W	February 4, 1987	4–1	New York Islanders (1986–87)	17–32–6
56	T	February 6, 1987	2–2 OT	St. Louis Blues (1986–87)	17–32–7
57	L	February 8, 1987	2–3	Calgary Flames (1986–87)	17–33–7
58	T	February 14, 1987	3–3 OT	@ Pittsburgh Penguins (1986–87)	17–33–8
59	W	February 17, 1987	4–3	@ St. Louis Blues (1986–87)	18–33–8
60	L	February 18, 1987	3–7	@ Minnesota North Stars (1986–87)	18–34–8
61	L	February 20, 1987	3–6	Washington Capitals (1986–87)	18–35–8
62	W	February 22, 1987	3–2	Toronto Maple Leafs (1986–87)	19–35–8
63	L	February 24, 1987	0–2	@ Calgary Flames (1986–87)	19–36–8
64	L	February 26, 1987	4–5	@ Detroit Red Wings (1986–87)	19–37–8
65	L	February 28, 1987	6–8	@ Toronto Maple Leafs (1986–87)	19–38–8

March

Game	Result	Date	Score	Opponent	Record
66	W	March 1, 1987	4–2	@ Buffalo Sabres (1986–87)	20–38–8
67	L	March 4, 1987	5–8	Edmonton Oilers (1986–87)	20–39–8
68	W	March 6, 1987	4–1	Montreal Canadiens (1986–87)	21–39–8
69	L	March 8, 1987	2–5	@ Los Angeles Kings (1986–87)	21–40–8
70	W	March 10, 1987	7–4	Detroit Red Wings (1986–87)	22–40–8
71	W	March 13, 1987	6–4	Buffalo Sabres (1986–87)	23–40–8
72	W	March 17, 1987	4–2	Quebec Nordiques (1986–87)	24–40–8
73	W	March 20, 1987	6–5 OT	Winnipeg Jets (1986–87)	25–40–8
74	L	March 22, 1987	2–3	@ Winnipeg Jets (1986–87)	25–41–8
75	W	March 26, 1987	5–2	@ New York Islanders (1986–87)	26–41–8
76	L	March 28, 1987	1–2	@ Boston Bruins (1986–87)	26–42–8
77	L	March 29, 1987	4–7	@ Hartford Whalers (1986–87)	26–43–8

April

Game	Result	Date	Score	Opponent	Record
78	W	April 1, 1987	8–3	@ Los Angeles Kings (1986–87)	27–43–8
79	W	April 3, 1987	6–4	Winnipeg Jets (1986–87)	28–43–8
80	W	April 5, 1987	5–2	Los Angeles Kings (1986–87)	29–43–8

Legend: Win (2 points) Loss (0 points) Tie (1 point)

== Draft picks ==
Vancouver's draft picks at the 1986 NHL entry draft held at the Montreal Forum in Montreal.

Round	#	Player	Nationality	College/Junior/Club team (League)
1	7	Dan Woodley	United States	Portland Winter Hawks (WHL)
3	49	Don Gibson	Canada	Winkler Flyers (MJHL)
4	70	Ronnie Stern	Canada	Longueuil Chevaliers (QMJHL)
5	91	Eric Murano	Canada	Calgary Canucks (AJHL)
6	112	Steve Herniman	Canada	Cornwall Royals (OHL)
7	133	Jon Helgeson	United States	Roseau High School (USHS-MN)
8	154	Jeff Noble	Canada	Kitchener Rangers (OHL)
9	175	Matt Merten	Canada	Stratford Cullitons (WOJBHL)
10	196	Marc Lyons	Canada	Kingston Canadians (OHL)
11	217	Todd Hawkins	Canada	Belleville Bulls (OHL)
12	238	Vladimir Krutov	Soviet Union	CSKA Moscow (USSR)
S2	10	David Gourlie	Canada	University of Denver (WCHA)

== See also ==
- 1986–87 NHL season
