= 1986–87 Washington Capitals season =

NHL hockey team season

1986–87 Washington Capitals
- Division: 2nd Patrick
- Conference: 4th Wales
- 1986–87 record: 38–32–10
- Home record: 22–15–3
- Road record: 16–17–7
- Goals for: 285
- Goals against: 278

Team information
- General manager: David Poile
- Coach: Bryan Murray
- Captain: Rod Langway
- Arena: Capital Centre

Team leaders
- Goals: Mike Gartner (41)
- Assists: Larry Murphy (58)
- Points: Larry Murphy (81)
- Penalty minutes: Scott Stevens (283)
- Plus/minus: Larry Murphy (+25)
- Wins: Bob Mason (20)
- Goals against average: Pete Peeters (3.22)

The 1986–87 Washington Capitals season was the Washington Capitals 13th season in the National Hockey League (NHL).

== Regular season ==
=== Final standings ===
Patrick Division
	GP	W	L	T	GF	GA	Pts
**Philadelphia Flyers**	80	46	26	8	310	245	100
**Washington Capitals**	80	38	32	10	285	278	86
**New York Islanders**	80	35	33	12	279	281	82
**New York Rangers**	80	34	38	8	307	323	76
Pittsburgh Penguins	80	30	38	12	297	290	72
New Jersey Devils	80	29	45	6	293	368	64

Note: GP = Games played, W = Wins, L = Losses, T = Ties, Pts = Points, GF = Goals for, GA = Goals against
Note: Teams that qualified for the playoffs are highlighted in bold.

=== Record vs. opponents ===
Patrick Division record vs. opponents

==== Vs. Wales Conference ====
**Vs. Patrick Division**

1986–87 NHL records
Team	**NJD**	**NYI**	**NYR**	**PHI**	**PIT**	**WSH**	**Total**
New Jersey	—	2–5	4–3	2–4–1	4–3	1–6	13–21–1
N.Y. Islanders	5–2	—	3–3–1	3–4	5–0–2	2–3–2	18–12–2
N.Y. Rangers	3–4	3–3–1	—	4–3	3–2–2	4–3	17–15–3
Philadelphia	4–2–1	4–3	3–4	—	4–1–2	5–1–1	20–11–4
Pittsburgh	3–4	0–5–2	2–3–2	1–4–2	—	4–3	10–19–6
Washington	6–1	3–2–2	3–4	1–5–1	3–4	—	16–16–3

**Vs. Adams Division**

1986–87 NHL records
Team	**BOS**	**BUF**	**HFD**	**MTL**	**QUE**	**Total**
New Jersey	1–1–1	1–2	1–1–1	1–2	0–1–2	4–7–4
N.Y. Islanders	0–2–1	1–1–1	1–2	1–1–1	2–1	5–7–3
N.Y. Rangers	2–1	2–1	0–3	0–2–1	2–1	6–8–1
Philadelphia	2–1	2–1	1–2	2–0–1	2–0–1	9–4–2
Pittsburgh	1–2	2–0–1	0–3	1–1–1	3–0	7–6–2
Washington	1–1–1	1–2	1–2	3–0	0–2–1	6–7–2

==== Vs. Campbell Conference ====
**Vs. Norris Division**

1986–87 NHL records
Team	**CHI**	**DET**	**MIN**	**STL**	**TOR**	**Total**
New Jersey	1–2	2–1	1–2	2–1	1–2	7–8–0
N.Y. Islanders	1–2	2–1	3–0	1–1–1	2–1	9–5–1
N.Y. Rangers	1–1–1	1–2	1–1–1	1–2	1–1–1	5–7–3
Philadelphia	2–0–1	2–1	1–2	3–0	1–1–1	9–4–2
Pittsburgh	2–1	1–2	3–0	1–0–2	1–2	8–5–2
Washington	1–1–1	2–0–1	2–0–1	2–0–1	2–1	9–2–4

**Vs. Smythe Division**

1986–87 NHL records
Team	**CGY**	**EDM**	**LAK**	**VAN**	**WIN**	**Total**
New Jersey	1–2	1–2	1–2	2–0–1	0–3	5–9–1
N.Y. Islanders	0–2–1	0–2–1	1–2	1–2	1–1–1	3–9–2
N.Y. Rangers	1–2	0–3	2–0–1	2–1	1–2	6–8–1
Philadelphia	1–2	2–1	1–2	2–1	2–1	8–7–0
Pittsburgh	1–2	1–2	1–2	1–0–2	1–2	5–8–2
Washington	1–2	2–1	0–3	3–0	1–1–1	7–7–1

== Schedule and results ==
1986–87 regular season
October

Game	Result	Date	Score	Opponent	Record
1	L	October 9, 1986	4–5	@ Pittsburgh Penguins (1986–87)	0–1–0
2	L	October 11, 1986	1–6	Philadelphia Flyers (1986–87)	0–2–0
3	W	October 13, 1986	7–6 OT	@ New York Rangers (1986–87)	1–2–0
4	L	October 16, 1986	4–7	@ New York Islanders (1986–87)	1–3–0
5	L	October 18, 1986	2–4	Buffalo Sabres (1986–87)	1–4–0
6	W	October 20, 1986	5–4	@ Montreal Canadiens (1986–87)	2–4–0
7	T	October 21, 1986	4–4 OT	@ Quebec Nordiques (1986–87)	2–4–1
8	W	October 24, 1986	8–2	Minnesota North Stars (1986–87)	3–4–1
9	W	October 25, 1986	2–1	New Jersey Devils (1986–87)	4–4–1
10	W	October 28, 1986	5–2	@ Vancouver Canucks (1986–87)	5–4–1
11	L	October 29, 1986	3–6	@ Edmonton Oilers (1986–87)	5–5–1

November

Game	Result	Date	Score	Opponent	Record
12	L	November 1, 1986	1–4	@ Calgary Flames (1986–87)	5–6–1
13	L	November 4, 1986	1–7	@ New York Islanders (1986–87)	5–7–1
14	W	November 5, 1986	3–2	Vancouver Canucks (1986–87)	6–7–1
15	W	November 8, 1986	3–2	Chicago Blackhawks (1986–87)	7–7–1
16	T	November 11, 1986	2–2 OT	@ Minnesota North Stars (1986–87)	7–7–2
17	T	November 12, 1986	2–2 OT	@ Chicago Blackhawks (1986–87)	7–7–3
18	L	November 14, 1986	1–4	Quebec Nordiques (1986–87)	7–8–3
19	L	November 16, 1986	2–6	@ Philadelphia Flyers (1986–87)	7–9–3
20	L	November 18, 1986	5–6	Los Angeles Kings (1986–87)	7–10–3
21	T	November 21, 1986	3–3 OT	@ Detroit Red Wings (1986–87)	7–10–4
22	L	November 22, 1986	4–5	Pittsburgh Penguins (1986–87)	7–11–4
23	T	November 26, 1986	2–2 OT	Boston Bruins (1986–87)	7–11–5
24	L	November 28, 1986	2–4	Philadelphia Flyers (1986–87)	7–12–5
25	L	November 29, 1986	3–4	@ Quebec Nordiques (1986–87)	7–13–5

December

Game	Result	Date	Score	Opponent	Record
26	W	December 1, 1986	2–1 OT	@ Montreal Canadiens (1986–87)	8–13–5
27	T	December 3, 1986	3–3 OT	@ Winnipeg Jets (1986–87)	8–13–6
28	W	December 6, 1986	3–1	Montreal Canadiens (1986–87)	9–13–6
29	W	December 9, 1986	4–2	New Jersey Devils (1986–87)	10–13–6
30	L	December 10, 1986	2–8	@ Toronto Maple Leafs (1986–87)	10–14–6
31	L	December 14, 1986	1–3	New York Rangers (1986–87)	10–15–6
32	L	December 17, 1986	1–6	@ New York Rangers (1986–87)	10–16–6
33	L	December 19, 1986	4–6	@ New Jersey Devils (1986–87)	10–17–6
34	W	December 20, 1986	5–3	St. Louis Blues (1986–87)	11–17–6
35	W	December 26, 1986	2–1	New York Islanders (1986–87)	12–17–6
36	L	December 28, 1986	5–7	@ Chicago Blackhawks (1986–87)	12–18–6
37	L	December 30, 1986	1–3	Hartford Whalers (1986–87)	12–19–6

January

Game	Result	Date	Score	Opponent	Record
38	W	January 1, 1987	4–3 OT	Pittsburgh Penguins (1986–87)	13–19–6
39	L	January 3, 1987	1–4	Philadelphia Flyers (1986–87)	13–20–6
40	W	January 5, 1987	6–4	@ St. Louis Blues (1986–87)	14–20–6
41	L	January 7, 1987	2–5	@ Pittsburgh Penguins (1986–87)	14–21–6
42	W	January 9, 1987	3–2	Pittsburgh Penguins (1986–87)	15–21–6
43	T	January 11, 1987	2–2 OT	@ Philadelphia Flyers (1986–87)	15–21–7
44	L	January 13, 1987	2–3	Winnipeg Jets (1986–87)	15–22–7
45	W	January 15, 1987	3–2	@ New York Islanders (1986–87)	16–22–7
46	W	January 17, 1987	6–1	@ Hartford Whalers (1986–87)	17–22–7
47	W	January 18, 1987	6–1	@ New Jersey Devils (1986–87)	18–22–7
48	W	January 20, 1987	6–3	New Jersey Devils (1986–87)	19–22–7
49	W	January 23, 1987	3–2	@ Buffalo Sabres (1986–87)	20–22–7
50	L	January 24, 1987	3–6	Buffalo Sabres (1986–87)	20–23–7
51	L	January 27, 1987	5–7	@ Pittsburgh Penguins (1986–87)	20–24–7
52	W	January 28, 1987	2–1	@ Detroit Red Wings (1986–87)	21–24–7
53	T	January 30, 1987	3–3 OT	New York Islanders (1986–87)	21–24–8

February

Game	Result	Date	Score	Opponent	Record
54	W	February 1, 1987	6–4	Winnipeg Jets (1986–87)	22–24–8
55	L	February 4, 1987	2–3	@ New York Rangers (1986–87)	22–25–8
56	L	February 6, 1987	2–5	Hartford Whalers (1986–87)	22–26–8
57	L	February 7, 1987	4–5 OT	New York Rangers (1986–87)	22–27–8
58	W	February 15, 1987	5–3	@ Edmonton Oilers (1986–87)	23–27–8
59	L	February 18, 1987	4–7	@ Los Angeles Kings (1986–87)	23–28–8
60	W	February 20, 1987	6–3	@ Vancouver Canucks (1986–87)	24–28–8
61	W	February 22, 1987	5–2	@ Calgary Flames (1986–87)	25–28–8
62	W	February 24, 1987	8–2	Detroit Red Wings (1986–87)	26–28–8
63	W	February 27, 1987	5–2	Edmonton Oilers (1986–87)	27–28–8

March

Game	Result	Date	Score	Opponent	Record
64	W	March 1, 1987	7–3	New York Rangers (1986–87)	28–28–8
65	W	March 3, 1987	3–2	New Jersey Devils (1986–87)	29–28–8
66	L	March 5, 1987	2–4	@ Philadelphia Flyers (1986–87)	29–29–8
67	L	March 7, 1987	2–3 OT	@ Boston Bruins (1986–87)	29–30–8
68	L	March 10, 1987	3–6	Calgary Flames (1986–87)	29–31–8
69	W	March 13, 1987	10–2	Toronto Maple Leafs (1986–87)	30–31–8
70	T	March 14, 1987	3–3 OT	@ St. Louis Blues (1986–87)	30–31–9
71	L	March 17, 1987	4–5	Los Angeles Kings (1986–87)	30–32–9
72	W	March 20, 1987	4–3	Pittsburgh Penguins (1986–87)	31–32–9
73	W	March 22, 1987	4–3	Boston Bruins (1986–87)	32–32–9
74	W	March 24, 1987	3–1	@ New York Islanders (1986–87)	33–32–9
75	T	March 27, 1987	2–2 OT	New York Islanders (1986–87)	33–32–10
76	W	March 29, 1987	4–2	Minnesota North Stars (1986–87)	34–32–10
77	W	March 31, 1987	4–2	Toronto Maple Leafs (1986–87)	35–32–10

April

Game	Result	Date	Score	Opponent	Record
78	W	April 1, 1987	5–1	@ New York Rangers (1986–87)	36–32–10
79	W	April 4, 1987	3–2 OT	Philadelphia Flyers (1986–87)	37–32–10
80	W	April 5, 1987	6–5 OT	@ New Jersey Devils (1986–87)	38–32–10

Legend: Win (2 points) Loss (0 points) Tie (1 point)

== Playoffs ==
The 1987 playoff Capitals run was best known for the Easter Epic, when the Caps played the longest game 7 in their franchise history through four overtime periods. Unfortunately, they lost to the New York Islanders 3–2 in that game seven and lost the series 4–3.

April 8	New York Islanders	3–4	Washington Capitals	Capital Centre

April 9	New York Islanders	3–1	Washington Capitals	Capital Centre

April 11	Washington Capitals	2–0	New York Islanders	Nassau Coliseum

April 12	Washington Capitals	4–1	New York Islanders	Nassau Coliseum

April 14	New York Islanders	4–2	Washington Capitals	Capital Centre

April 16	Washington Capitals	4–5	New York Islanders	Nassau Coliseum

April 18	New York Islanders	3–2	4OT	Washington Capitals	Capital Centre

New York won series 4–3

== Player statistics ==
=== Regular season ===
Scoring

Player	Pos	GP	G	A	Pts	PIM	+/-	PPG	SHG	GWG
Larry Murphy	D	80	23	58	81	39	25	8	0	4
Mike Gartner	RW	78	41	32	73	61	1	5	6	10
Scott Stevens	D	77	10	51	61	283	13	2	0	0
Craig Laughlin	RW	80	22	30	52	67	-3	11	0	5
Gaetan Duchesne	LW	74	17	35	52	53	18	0	1	4
Dave Christian	RW	76	23	27	50	8	-5	5	0	2
Bobby Gould	RW	78	23	27	50	74	18	1	1	2
Greg Adams	LW	67	14	30	44	184	9	2	0	0
Michal Pivoňka	C	73	18	25	43	41	-19	4	0	2
Alan Haworth	C	50	25	16	41	43	3	9	0	2
Mike Ridley	C	40	15	19	34	20	-1	6	0	3
Rod Langway	D	78	2	25	27	53	11	0	0	1
Kevin Hatcher	D	78	8	16	24	144	-29	1	0	2
Kelly Miller	LW	39	10	12	22	26	10	3	1	0
Lou Franceschetti	RW	75	12	9	21	127	-9	0	0	1
David Jensen	C	46	8	8	16	12	-10	2	0	0
Bobby Carpenter	C	22	5	7	12	21	-7	4	0	0
Garry Galley	D	18	1	10	11	10	3	1	0	0
John Blum	D	66	2	8	10	133	1	0	0	0
Greg Smith	D	45	0	9	9	31	-6	0	0	0
John Barrett	D	55	2	2	4	43	-16	0	0	0
Pete Peeters	G	37	0	4	4	16	0	0	0	0
Gary Sampson	LW	25	1	2	3	4	-9	0	0	0
Jeff Greenlaw	LW	22	0	3	3	44	2	0	0	0
Yvon Corriveau	LW	17	1	1	2	24	-4	0	0	0
Ed Kastelic	W	23	1	1	2	83	-3	1	0	0
Paul Cavallini	D	6	0	2	2	8	-4	0	0	0
Stephen Leach	RW	15	1	0	1	6	-4	0	0	0
Yves Beaudoin	D	6	0	0	0	5	-4	0	0	0
Bob Crawford	RW	12	0	0	0	0	0	0	0	0
Al Jensen	G	6	0	0	0	0	0	0	0	0
Grant Martin	LW	9	0	0	0	4	-1	0	0	0
Bob Mason	G	45	0	0	0	0	0	0	0	0
Jim Thomson	RW	10	0	0	0	35	-2	0	0	0

Goaltending

Player	MIN	GP	W	L	T	GA	GAA	SO	SA	SV	SV%
Bob Mason	2536	45	20	18	5	137	3.24	0	1247	1110	.890
Pete Peeters	2002	37	17	11	4	107	3.21	0	930	823	.885
Al Jensen	328	6	1	3	1	27	4.94	0	184	157	.853
Team:	4866	80	38	32	10	271	3.34	0	2361	2090	.885

=== Playoffs ===
Scoring

Player	Pos	GP	G	A	Pts	PIM	PPG	SHG	GWG
Mike Gartner	RW	7	4	3	7	14	0	0	0
Scott Stevens	D	7	0	5	5	19	0	0	0
Kelly Miller	LW	7	2	2	4	0	0	0	0
Larry Murphy	D	7	2	2	4	6	0	0	1
Greg Adams	LW	7	1	3	4	38	1	0	0
Dave Christian	RW	7	1	3	4	6	0	0	1
Gaetan Duchesne	LW	7	3	0	3	14	0	0	0
Mike Ridley	C	7	2	1	3	6	0	0	1
Bobby Gould	RW	7	0	3	3	8	0	0	0
Alan Haworth	C	6	0	3	3	7	0	0	0
Michal Pivonka	C	7	1	1	2	2	0	0	0
Kevin Hatcher	D	7	1	0	1	20	0	0	0
Ed Kastelic	W	5	1	0	1	13	1	0	0
Grant Martin	LW	1	1	0	1	2	0	0	0
John Blum	D	6	0	1	1	4	0	0	0
Rod Langway	D	7	0	1	1	2	0	0	0
Lou Franceschetti	RW	7	0	0	0	23	0	0	0
Garry Galley	D	2	0	0	0	0	0	0	0
David Jensen	C	7	0	0	0	2	0	0	0
Craig Laughlin	RW	1	0	0	0	0	0	0	0
Bob Mason	G	4	0	0	0	0	0	0	0
Pete Peeters	G	3	0	0	0	2	0	0	0
Greg Smith	D	7	0	0	0	11	0	0	0

Goaltending

Player	MIN	GP	W	L	GA	GAA	SO	SA	SV	SV%
Bob Mason	309	4	2	2	9	1.75	1	143	134	.937
Pete Peeters	180	3	1	2	9	3.00	0	76	67	.882
Team:	489	7	3	4	18	2.21	1	219	201	.918

Note: GP = Games played; G = Goals; A = Assists; Pts = Points; +/- = Plus/minus; PIM = Penalty minutes; PPG=Power-play goals; SHG=Short-handed goals; GWG=Game-winning goals
MIN=Minutes played; W = Wins; L = Losses; T = Ties; GA = Goals against; GAA = Goals against average; SO = Shutouts; SA=Shots against; SV=Shots saved; SV% = Save percentage;

== Draft picks ==
Washington's draft picks at the 1986 NHL entry draft held at the Montreal Forum in Montreal.

Round	#	Player	Nationality	College/Junior/Club team (League)
1	19	Jeff Greenlaw	Canada	Canadian National Development Team
2	40	Steve Seftel	Canada	Kingston Canadians (OHL)
3	60	Shawn Simpson	Canada	Sault Ste. Marie Greyhounds (OHL)
3	61	Jim Hrivnak	Canada	Merrimack College (Hockey East)
4	82	Erin Ginnell	Canada	Calgary Wranglers (WHL)
5	103	John Purves	Canada	Hamilton Steelhawks (OHL)
6	124	Stefan Nilsson	Sweden	Luleå HF (Sweden)
7	145	Peter Choma	Canada	Belleville Bulls (OHL)
8	166	Lee Davidson	Canada	Penticton Knights (BCHL)
9	187	Tero Toivola	Finland	Tappara (Finland)
10	208	Bob Babcock	Canada	Sault Ste. Marie Greyhounds (OHL)
11	229	John Schratz	Canada	Amherst Ramblers (MVLHL)
12	250	Scott McCrory	Canada	Oshawa Generals (OHL)
S2	22	Steve Cousins	Canada	University of Alberta (CIAU)

== See also ==
- 1986–87 NHL season
