= 1986–87 Minnesota North Stars season =

National Hockey League team season

1986–87 Minnesota North Stars
- Division: 5th Norris
- Conference: 8th Campbell
- 1986–87 record: 30–40–10
- Home record: 17–20–3
- Road record: 13–20–7
- Goals for: 296
- Goals against: 314

Team information
- General manager: Lou Nanne
- Coach: Lorne Henning; Glen Sonmor
- Captain: Craig Hartsburg
- Arena: Met Center

Team leaders
- Goals: Dino Ciccarelli (52)
- Assists: Dino Ciccarelli (51)
- Points: Dino Ciccarelli (103)
- Penalty minutes: Willi Plett (261)
- Plus/minus: Brian Lawton (+20)
- Wins: Don Beaupre (17)
- Goals against average: Kari Takko (3.46)

The 1986–87 Minnesota North Stars season was the North Stars' 20th season.

Coached by Lorne Henning (30–39–9) and Glen Sonmor (0–1–1), the team compiled a record of 30–40–10 for 70 points, to finish the regular season 5th in the Norris Division and failed to qualify for the playoffs for the first time since 1979.

== Regular season ==
=== Final standings ===
Norris Division
	GP	W	L	T	GF	GA	Pts
**St. Louis Blues**	80	32	33	15	281	293	79
**Detroit Red Wings**	80	34	36	10	260	274	78
**Chicago Blackhawks**	80	29	37	14	290	310	72
**Toronto Maple Leafs**	80	32	42	6	286	319	70
Minnesota North Stars	80	30	40	10	296	314	70

Note: GP = Games played, W = Wins, L = Losses, T = Ties, Pts = Points, GF = Goals for, GA = Goals against
Note: Teams that qualified for the playoffs are highlighted in bold.

=== Record vs. opponents ===
Norris Division record vs. opponents

==== Vs. Campbell Conference ====
**Vs. Norris Division**

1986–87 NHL records
Team	**CHI**	**DET**	**MIN**	**STL**	**TOR**	**Total**
Chicago	—	3–4–1	2–4–2	1–3–4	4–4	**10–15–7**
Detroit	4–3–1	—	7–0–1	3–4–1	2–5–1	**16–12–4**
Minnesota	4–2–2	0–7–1	—	2–5–1	6–2	**12–16–4**
St. Louis	3–1–4	4–3–1	5–2–1	—	5–2–1	**17–8–7**
Toronto	4–4	5–2–1	2–6	2–5–1	—	**13–17–2**

**Vs. Smythe Division**

1986–87 NHL records
Team	**CGY**	**EDM**	**LAK**	**VAN**	**WIN**	**Total**
Chicago	0–3	2–1	1–1–1	1–1–1	3–0	**7–6–2**
Detroit	2–1	0–3	0–3	2–1	1–1–1	**5–9–1**
Minnesota	1–1–1	0–2–1	2–0–1	3–0	1–2	**7–5–3**
St. Louis	2–1	0–3	1–1–1	0–2–1	0–1–2	**3–8–4**
Toronto	1–2	1–2	1–1–1	1–2	2–1	**6–8–1**

**Vs. Wales Conference**

**Vs. Adams Division**

1986–87 NHL records
Team	**BOS**	**BUF**	**HFD**	**MTL**	**QUE**	**Total**
Chicago	1–1–1	1–2	2–1	0–2–1	1–2	**5–8–2**
Detroit	2–0–1	0–2–1	1–1–1	1–1–1	2–1	**6–5–4**
Minnesota	0–3	3–0	2–1	1–2	0–2–1	**6–8–1**
St. Louis	1–2	2–1	1–2	1–2	3–0	**8–7–0**
Toronto	1–2	2–0–1	1–2	1–2	0–3	**5–9–1**

**Vs. Patrick Division**

1986–87 NHL records
Team	**NJD**	**NYI**	**NYR**	**PHI**	**PIT**	**WSH**	**Total**
Chicago	2–1	2–1	1–1–1	0–2–1	1–2	1–1–1	**7–8–3**
Detroit	1–2	1–2	2–1	1–2	2–1	0–2–1	**7–10–1**
Minnesota	2–1	0–3	1–1–1	2–1	0–3	0–2–1	**5–11–2**
St. Louis	1–2	1–1–1	2–1	0–3	0–1–2	0–2–1	**4–10–4**
Toronto	2–1	1–2	1–1–1	1–1–1	2–1	1–2	**8–8–2**

== Schedule and results ==
1986–87 regular season
October

Game	Result	Date	Score	Opponent	Record
1	T	October 11, 1986	4–4 OT	@ Quebec Nordiques (1986–87)	0–0–1
2	L	October 13, 1986	4–6	@ Montreal Canadiens (1986–87)	0–1–1
3	L	October 16, 1986	3–5	Boston Bruins (1986–87)	0–2–1
4	W	October 18, 1986	4–1	Vancouver Canucks (1986–87)	1–2–1
5	W	October 19, 1986	8–5	@ Chicago Blackhawks (1986–87)	2–2–1
6	W	October 22, 1986	8–3	@ St. Louis Blues (1986–87)	3–2–1
7	L	October 24, 1986	2–8	@ Washington Capitals (1986–87)	3–3–1
8	L	October 26, 1986	1–4	@ Philadelphia Flyers (1986–87)	3–4–1
9	W	October 28, 1986	7–4	Calgary Flames (1986–87)	4–4–1
10	L	October 30, 1986	1–3	Detroit Red Wings (1986–87)	4–5–1

November

Game	Result	Date	Score	Opponent	Record
11	L	November 1, 1986	5–6	Chicago Blackhawks (1986–87)	4–6–1
12	L	November 5, 1986	2–4	@ Chicago Blackhawks (1986–87)	4–7–1
13	W	November 6, 1986	4–1	Toronto Maple Leafs (1986–87)	5–7–1
14	L	November 8, 1986	2–4	Pittsburgh Penguins (1986–87)	5–8–1
15	T	November 11, 1986	2–2 OT	Washington Capitals (1986–87)	5–8–2
16	L	November 15, 1986	3–7	New York Islanders (1986–87)	5–9–2
17	L	November 18, 1986	3–4	St. Louis Blues (1986–87)	5–10–2
18	L	November 19, 1986	5–7	@ St. Louis Blues (1986–87)	5–11–2
19	W	November 22, 1986	6–2	New Jersey Devils (1986–87)	6–11–2
20	W	November 26, 1986	5–2	Chicago Blackhawks (1986–87)	7–11–2
21	W	November 28, 1986	6–3	Toronto Maple Leafs (1986–87)	8–11–2
22	W	November 29, 1986	7–2	@ Toronto Maple Leafs (1986–87)	9–11–2

December

Game	Result	Date	Score	Opponent	Record
23	W	December 2, 1986	5–4	@ Buffalo Sabres (1986–87)	10–11–2
24	W	December 4, 1986	5–3	@ New Jersey Devils (1986–87)	11–11–2
25	L	December 6, 1986	2–5	@ Pittsburgh Penguins (1986–87)	11–12–2
26	L	December 9, 1986	2–3	Edmonton Oilers (1986–87)	11–13–2
27	T	December 11, 1986	6–6 OT	@ Detroit Red Wings (1986–87)	11–13–3
28	W	December 13, 1986	5–4	Philadelphia Flyers (1986–87)	12–13–3
29	W	December 15, 1986	4–3	@ New York Rangers (1986–87)	13–13–3
30	L	December 16, 1986	2–4	@ New York Islanders (1986–87)	13–14–3
31	W	December 18, 1986	6–5 OT	@ Toronto Maple Leafs (1986–87)	14–14–3
32	L	December 20, 1986	1–4	Quebec Nordiques (1986–87)	14–15–3
33	L	December 23, 1986	3–4 OT	Toronto Maple Leafs (1986–87)	14–16–3
34	W	December 26, 1986	4–2	Winnipeg Jets (1986–87)	15–16–3
35	L	December 28, 1986	4–5	@ Winnipeg Jets (1986–87)	15–17–3
36	W	December 31, 1986	5–2	Hartford Whalers (1986–87)	16–17–3

January

Game	Result	Date	Score	Opponent	Record
37	L	January 2, 1987	1–2	@ Detroit Red Wings (1986–87)	16–18–3
38	L	January 3, 1987	2–3	Detroit Red Wings (1986–87)	16–19–3
39	T	January 5, 1987	3–3 OT	@ New York Rangers (1986–87)	16–19–4
40	L	January 6, 1987	3–5	@ New York Islanders (1986–87)	16–20–4
41	W	January 8, 1987	5–4 OT	Buffalo Sabres (1986–87)	17–20–4
42	W	January 10, 1987	4–3	Hartford Whalers (1986–87)	18–20–4
43	T	January 12, 1987	4–4 OT	St. Louis Blues (1986–87)	18–20–5
44	W	January 14, 1987	3–2	@ Toronto Maple Leafs (1986–87)	19–20–5
45	W	January 17, 1987	3–2	Chicago Blackhawks (1986–87)	20–20–5
46	L	January 18, 1987	3–5	@ Winnipeg Jets (1986–87)	20–21–5
47	W	January 20, 1987	5–0	Buffalo Sabres (1986–87)	21–21–5
48	W	January 23, 1987	6–3	@ Los Angeles Kings (1986–87)	22–21–5
49	T	January 29, 1987	3–3 OT	@ Calgary Flames (1986–87)	22–21–6
50	T	January 30, 1987	2–2 OT	@ Edmonton Oilers (1986–87)	22–21–7

February

Game	Result	Date	Score	Opponent	Record
51	W	February 1, 1987	4–3	@ Vancouver Canucks (1986–87)	23–21–7
52	L	February 4, 1987	5–6 OT	Edmonton Oilers (1986–87)	23–22–7
53	L	February 6, 1987	4–6	@ Detroit Red Wings (1986–87)	23–23–7
54	L	February 7, 1987	3–5	Detroit Red Wings (1986–87)	23–24–7
55	L	February 14, 1987	2–3	Calgary Flames (1986–87)	23–25–7
56	W	February 15, 1987	3–2	St. Louis Blues (1986–87)	24–25–7
57	W	February 18, 1987	7–3	Vancouver Canucks (1986–87)	25–25–7
58	L	February 19, 1987	2–6	@ St. Louis Blues (1986–87)	25–26–7
59	L	February 21, 1987	0–1	Boston Bruins (1986–87)	25–27–7
60	W	February 23, 1987	4–3	@ Montreal Canadiens (1986–87)	26–27–7
61	L	February 24, 1987	4–5	@ Quebec Nordiques (1986–87)	26–28–7
62	W	February 28, 1987	6–3	Los Angeles Kings (1986–87)	27–28–7

March

Game	Result	Date	Score	Opponent	Record
63	W	March 1, 1987	5–4	Philadelphia Flyers (1986–87)	28–28–7
64	T	March 3, 1987	4–4 OT	@ Los Angeles Kings (1986–87)	28–28–8
65	L	March 5, 1987	3–9	@ Detroit Red Wings (1986–87)	28–29–8
66	L	March 7, 1987	3–7	Pittsburgh Penguins (1986–87)	28–30–8
67	L	March 9, 1987	4–5	Montreal Canadiens (1986–87)	28–31–8
68	L	March 11, 1987	2–4	Toronto Maple Leafs (1986–87)	28–32–8
69	L	March 14, 1987	3–4	Detroit Red Wings (1986–87)	28–33–8
70	W	March 15, 1987	4–2	@ Chicago Blackhawks (1986–87)	29–33–8
71	T	March 17, 1987	3–3 OT	Chicago Blackhawks (1986–87)	29–33–9
72	L	March 19, 1987	2–6	@ Boston Bruins (1986–87)	29–34–9
73	L	March 21, 1987	1–5	@ Hartford Whalers (1986–87)	29–35–9
74	L	March 23, 1987	5–8	St. Louis Blues (1986–87)	29–36–9
75	W	March 25, 1987	6–2	@ Toronto Maple Leafs (1986–87)	30–36–9
76	L	March 27, 1987	2–5	@ New Jersey Devils (1986–87)	30–37–9
77	L	March 29, 1987	2–4	@ Washington Capitals (1986–87)	30–38–9
78	L	March 30, 1987	5–6	New York Rangers (1986–87)	30–39–9

April

Game	Result	Date	Score	Opponent	Record
79	T	April 1, 1987	4–4 OT	@ Chicago Blackhawks (1986–87)	30–39–10
80	L	April 4, 1987	1–4	@ St. Louis Blues (1986–87)	30–40–10

Legend: Win (2 points) Loss (0 points) Tie (1 point)

== Draft picks ==
Minnesota's draft picks at the 1986 NHL entry draft held at the Montreal Forum in Montreal.

Round	#	Player	Nationality	College/Junior/Club team (League)
1	12	Warren Babe	Canada	Lethbridge Broncos (WHL)
2	30	Neil Wilkinson	Canada	Selkirk Steelers (MJHL)
2	33	Dean Kolstad	Canada	Prince Albert Raiders (WHL)
3	54	Rick Bennett	United States	Wilbraham & Monson Academy (ISL)
3	55	Rob Zettler	Canada	Sault Ste. Marie Greyhounds (OHL)
3	58	Brad Turner	Canada	Calgary Canucks (AJHL)
4	75	Kirk Tomlinson	Canada	Hamilton Steelhawks (OHL)
5	96	Jari Gronstrand	Finland	Tappara (Finland)
8	159	Scott Mathias	United States	University of Denver (WCHA)
9	180	Lance Pitlick	United States	Robbinsdale Cooper High School (USHS-MN)
10	201	Dan Keczmer	United States	Detroit Little Caesars (MWEHL)
11	222	Garth Joy	Canada	Hamilton Steelhawks (OHL)
12	243	Kurt Stahura	United States	Williston Academy (ISL)
S2	15	Brian McKee	Canada	Bowling Green State University (CCHA)

== See also ==
- 1986–87 NHL season
