= 1986–87 St. Louis Blues season =

National Hockey League team season

1986–87 St. Louis Blues
- Norris Division champions
- Division: 1st Norris
- Conference: 4th Campbell
- 1986–87 record: 32–33–15
- Home record: 21–12–7
- Road record: 11–21–8
- Goals for: 281
- Goals against: 293

Team information
- General manager: Ron Caron
- Coach: Jacques Martin
- Captain: Brian Sutter
- Alternate captains: Bernie Federko; Rob Ramage
- Arena: St. Louis Arena

Team leaders
- Goals: Doug Gilmour (42)
- Assists: Doug Gilmour (63)
- Points: Doug Gilmour (105)
- Penalty minutes: Mark Hunter (167)
- Wins: Rick Wamsley (17)
- Goals against average: Greg Millen; Rick Wamsley (3.34)

The 1986–87 St. Louis Blues season was the 20th in franchise history. It involved the team finishing with a 32–33–15 record, good for 79 points, as they finished 1st in the Norris Division, clinching the title on the final day of the regular-season. This would be the final division title for the Blues until the 1999–2000 season.

== Regular season ==
=== Final standings ===
Norris Division
| | GP | W | L | T | GF | GA | Pts |
|---|---|---|---|---|---|---|---|
| **St. Louis Blues** | 80 | 32 | 33 | 15 | 281 | 293 | 79 |
| **Detroit Red Wings** | 80 | 34 | 36 | 10 | 260 | 274 | 78 |
| **Chicago Blackhawks** | 80 | 29 | 37 | 14 | 290 | 310 | 72 |
| **Toronto Maple Leafs** | 80 | 32 | 42 | 6 | 286 | 319 | 70 |
| Minnesota North Stars | 80 | 30 | 40 | 10 | 296 | 314 | 70 |

Note: GP = Games played, W = Wins, L = Losses, T = Ties, Pts = Points, GF = Goals for, GA = Goals against
Note: Teams that qualified for the playoffs are highlighted in bold.

=== Record vs. opponents ===
Norris Division record vs. opponents

==== Vs. Campbell Conference ====
**Vs. Norris Division**

1986–87 NHL records
| Team | **CHI** | **DET** | **MIN** | **STL** | **TOR** | **Total** |
|---|---|---|---|---|---|---|
| Chicago | — | 3–4–1 | 2–4–2 | 1–3–4 | 4–4 | **10–15–7** |
| Detroit | 4–3–1 | — | 7–0–1 | 3–4–1 | 2–5–1 | **16–12–4** |
| Minnesota | 4–2–2 | 0–7–1 | — | 2–5–1 | 6–2 | **12–16–4** |
| St. Louis | 3–1–4 | 4–3–1 | 5–2–1 | — | 5–2–1 | **17–8–7** |
| Toronto | 4–4 | 5–2–1 | 2–6 | 2–5–1 | — | **13–17–2** |

**Vs. Smythe Division**

1986–87 NHL records
| Team | **CGY** | **EDM** | **LAK** | **VAN** | **WIN** | **Total** |
|---|---|---|---|---|---|---|
| Chicago | 0–3 | 2–1 | 1–1–1 | 1–1–1 | 3–0 | **7–6–2** |
| Detroit | 2–1 | 0–3 | 0–3 | 2–1 | 1–1–1 | **5–9–1** |
| Minnesota | 1–1–1 | 0–2–1 | 2–0–1 | 3–0 | 1–2 | **7–5–3** |
| St. Louis | 2–1 | 0–3 | 1–1–1 | 0–2–1 | 0–1–2 | **3–8–4** |
| Toronto | 1–2 | 1–2 | 1–1–1 | 1–2 | 2–1 | **6–8–1** |

**Vs. Wales Conference**

**Vs. Adams Division**

1986–87 NHL records
| Team | **BOS** | **BUF** | **HFD** | **MTL** | **QUE** | **Total** |
|---|---|---|---|---|---|---|
| Chicago | 1–1–1 | 1–2 | 2–1 | 0–2–1 | 1–2 | **5–8–2** |
| Detroit | 2–0–1 | 0–2–1 | 1–1–1 | 1–1–1 | 2–1 | **6–5–4** |
| Minnesota | 0–3 | 3–0 | 2–1 | 1–2 | 0–2–1 | **6–8–1** |
| St. Louis | 1–2 | 2–1 | 1–2 | 1–2 | 3–0 | **8–7–0** |
| Toronto | 1–2 | 2–0–1 | 1–2 | 1–2 | 0–3 | **5–9–1** |

**Vs. Patrick Division**

1986–87 NHL records
| Team | **NJD** | **NYI** | **NYR** | **PHI** | **PIT** | **WSH** | **Total** |
|---|---|---|---|---|---|---|---|
| Chicago | 2–1 | 2–1 | 1–1–1 | 0–2–1 | 1–2 | 1–1–1 | **7–8–3** |
| Detroit | 1–2 | 1–2 | 2–1 | 1–2 | 2–1 | 0–2–1 | **7–10–1** |
| Minnesota | 2–1 | 0–3 | 1–1–1 | 2–1 | 0–3 | 0–2–1 | **5–11–2** |
| St. Louis | 1–2 | 1–1–1 | 2–1 | 0–3 | 0–1–2 | 0–2–1 | **4–10–4** |
| Toronto | 2–1 | 1–2 | 1–1–1 | 1–1–1 | 2–1 | 1–2 | **8–8–2** |

== Schedule and results ==
1986–87 regular season
October

| Game | Result | Date | Score | Opponent | Record |
|---|---|---|---|---|---|
| 1 | W | October 9, 1986 | 4–3 | @ Los Angeles Kings (1986–87) | 1–0–0 |
| 2 | L | October 11, 1986 | 3–4 | @ Vancouver Canucks (1986–87) | 1–1–0 |
| 3 | T | October 14, 1986 | 1–1 OT | @ Toronto Maple Leafs (1986–87) | 1–1–1 |
| 4 | W | October 18, 1986 | 4–3 | Quebec Nordiques (1986–87) | 2–1–1 |
| 5 | L | October 22, 1986 | 3–8 | Minnesota North Stars (1986–87) | 2–2–1 |
| 6 | T | October 24, 1986 | 1–1 OT | @ Detroit Red Wings (1986–87) | 2–2–2 |
| 7 | L | October 25, 1986 | 1–3 | Detroit Red Wings (1986–87) | 2–3–2 |
| 8 | W | October 29, 1986 | 7–2 | New York Rangers (1986–87) | 3–3–2 |

November

| Game | Result | Date | Score | Opponent | Record |
|---|---|---|---|---|---|
| 9 | T | November 1, 1986 | 3–3 OT | Pittsburgh Penguins (1986–87) | 3–3–3 |
| 10 | W | November 2, 1986 | 7–3 | Chicago Blackhawks (1986–87) | 4–3–3 |
| 11 | L | November 5, 1986 | 4–6 | @ Toronto Maple Leafs (1986–87) | 4–4–3 |
| 12 | L | November 7, 1986 | 0–2 | @ Winnipeg Jets (1986–87) | 4–5–3 |
| 13 | T | November 9, 1986 | 4–4 OT | @ Chicago Blackhawks (1986–87) | 4–5–4 |
| 14 | W | November 12, 1986 | 4–2 | Toronto Maple Leafs (1986–87) | 5–5–4 |
| 15 | W | November 15, 1986 | 4–3 | Chicago Blackhawks (1986–87) | 6–5–4 |
| 16 | W | November 18, 1986 | 4–3 | @ Minnesota North Stars (1986–87) | 7–5–4 |
| 17 | W | November 19, 1986 | 7–5 | Minnesota North Stars (1986–87) | 8–5–4 |
| 18 | L | November 21, 1986 | 0–4 | @ Hartford Whalers (1986–87) | 8–6–4 |
| 19 | L | November 22, 1986 | 5–6 | @ Boston Bruins (1986–87) | 8–7–4 |
| 20 | L | November 26, 1986 | 1–5 | New Jersey Devils (1986–87) | 8–8–4 |
| 21 | W | November 28, 1986 | 2–1 OT | @ Detroit Red Wings (1986–87) | 9–8–4 |
| 22 | L | November 29, 1986 | 2–4 | Detroit Red Wings (1986–87) | 9–9–4 |

December

| Game | Result | Date | Score | Opponent | Record |
|---|---|---|---|---|---|
| 23 | L | December 2, 1986 | 1–7 | @ Philadelphia Flyers (1986–87) | 9–10–4 |
| 24 | L | December 3, 1986 | 3–4 OT | @ Montreal Canadiens (1986–87) | 9–11–4 |
| 25 | W | December 5, 1986 | 6–5 | @ Buffalo Sabres (1986–87) | 10–11–4 |
| 26 | W | December 7, 1986 | 5–3 | Toronto Maple Leafs (1986–87) | 11–11–4 |
| 27 | W | December 9, 1986 | 4–1 | @ Quebec Nordiques (1986–87) | 12–11–4 |
| 28 | L | December 10, 1986 | 2–6 | @ Hartford Whalers (1986–87) | 12–12–4 |
| 29 | T | December 13, 1986 | 4–4 OT | Chicago Blackhawks (1986–87) | 12–12–5 |
| 30 | L | December 16, 1986 | 2–4 | Montreal Canadiens (1986–87) | 12–13–5 |
| 31 | T | December 18, 1986 | 3–3 OT | Winnipeg Jets (1986–87) | 12–13–6 |
| 32 | L | December 20, 1986 | 3–5 | @ Washington Capitals (1986–87) | 12–14–6 |
| 33 | L | December 21, 1986 | 6–7 | @ Philadelphia Flyers (1986–87) | 12–15–6 |
| 34 | L | December 26, 1986 | 6–8 | @ Chicago Blackhawks (1986–87) | 12–16–6 |
| 35 | W | December 27, 1986 | 3–2 | New York Rangers (1986–87) | 13–16–6 |
| 36 | W | December 30, 1986 | 4–3 | Boston Bruins (1986–87) | 14–16–6 |

January

| Game | Result | Date | Score | Opponent | Record |
|---|---|---|---|---|---|
| 37 | W | January 3, 1987 | 7–4 | Calgary Flames (1986–87) | 15–16–6 |
| 38 | L | January 5, 1987 | 4–6 | Washington Capitals (1986–87) | 15–17–6 |
| 39 | W | January 7, 1987 | 6–3 | Hartford Whalers (1986–87) | 16–17–6 |
| 40 | L | January 9, 1987 | 1–5 | @ Edmonton Oilers (1986–87) | 16–18–6 |
| 41 | L | January 10, 1987 | 2–5 | @ Calgary Flames (1986–87) | 16–19–6 |
| 42 | T | January 12, 1987 | 4–4 OT | @ Minnesota North Stars (1986–87) | 16–19–7 |
| 43 | L | January 16, 1987 | 3–5 | Los Angeles Kings (1986–87) | 16–20–7 |
| 44 | T | January 17, 1987 | 4–4 OT | Los Angeles Kings (1986–87) | 16–20–8 |
| 45 | L | January 21, 1987 | 2–4 | @ Toronto Maple Leafs (1986–87) | 16–21–8 |
| 46 | L | January 23, 1987 | 3–4 | @ Detroit Red Wings (1986–87) | 16–22–8 |
| 47 | W | January 24, 1987 | 5–3 | Detroit Red Wings (1986–87) | 17–22–8 |
| 48 | W | January 27, 1987 | 2–1 | Montreal Canadiens (1986–87) | 18–22–8 |
| 49 | W | January 29, 1987 | 4–2 | Toronto Maple Leafs (1986–87) | 19–22–8 |
| 50 | T | January 31, 1987 | 4–4 OT | Chicago Blackhawks (1986–87) | 19–22–9 |

February

| Game | Result | Date | Score | Opponent | Record |
|---|---|---|---|---|---|
| 51 | L | February 3, 1987 | 2–4 | Edmonton Oilers (1986–87) | 19–23–9 |
| 52 | W | February 5, 1987 | 2–1 | @ Calgary Flames (1986–87) | 20–23–9 |
| 53 | T | February 6, 1987 | 2–2 OT | @ Vancouver Canucks (1986–87) | 20–23–10 |
| 54 | L | February 8, 1987 | 2–6 | @ Edmonton Oilers (1986–87) | 20–24–10 |
| 55 | L | February 14, 1987 | 2–4 | Philadelphia Flyers (1986–87) | 20–25–10 |
| 56 | L | February 15, 1987 | 2–3 | @ Minnesota North Stars (1986–87) | 20–26–10 |
| 57 | L | February 17, 1987 | 3–4 | Vancouver Canucks (1986–87) | 20–27–10 |
| 58 | W | February 19, 1987 | 6–2 | Minnesota North Stars (1986–87) | 21–27–10 |
| 59 | W | February 21, 1987 | 4–3 OT | Quebec Nordiques (1986–87) | 22–27–10 |
| 60 | W | February 24, 1987 | 3–2 | New York Islanders (1986–87) | 23–27–10 |
| 61 | L | February 26, 1987 | 3–4 | @ Buffalo Sabres (1986–87) | 23–28–10 |
| 62 | T | February 28, 1987 | 3–3 OT | @ New York Islanders (1986–87) | 23–28–11 |

March

| Game | Result | Date | Score | Opponent | Record |
|---|---|---|---|---|---|
| 63 | T | March 1, 1987 | 5–5 OT | @ Pittsburgh Penguins (1986–87) | 23–28–12 |
| 64 | W | March 3, 1987 | 4–3 | @ Toronto Maple Leafs (1986–87) | 24–28–12 |
| 65 | T | March 5, 1987 | 1–1 OT | Winnipeg Jets (1986–87) | 24–28–13 |
| 66 | W | March 7, 1987 | 5–3 | Detroit Red Wings (1986–87) | 25–28–13 |
| 67 | W | March 9, 1987 | 3–2 OT | Toronto Maple Leafs (1986–87) | 26–28–13 |
| 68 | W | March 11, 1987 | 3–2 | @ Chicago Blackhawks (1986–87) | 27–28–13 |
| 69 | L | March 12, 1987 | 4–6 | @ Boston Bruins (1986–87) | 27–29–13 |
| 70 | T | March 14, 1987 | 3–3 OT | Washington Capitals (1986–87) | 27–29–14 |
| 71 | L | March 18, 1987 | 4–5 | @ Pittsburgh Penguins (1986–87) | 27–30–14 |
| 72 | L | March 21, 1987 | 6–7 OT | New Jersey Devils (1986–87) | 27–31–14 |
| 73 | W | March 23, 1987 | 8–5 | @ Minnesota North Stars (1986–87) | 28–31–14 |
| 74 | T | March 25, 1987 | 4–4 OT | @ Chicago Blackhawks (1986–87) | 28–31–15 |
| 75 | L | March 27, 1987 | 4–6 | @ New York Rangers (1986–87) | 28–32–15 |
| 76 | W | March 29, 1987 | 4–1 | @ New Jersey Devils (1986–87) | 29–32–15 |
| 77 | L | March 31, 1987 | 3–4 | New York Islanders (1986–87) | 29–33–15 |

April

| Game | Result | Date | Score | Opponent | Record |
|---|---|---|---|---|---|
| 78 | W | April 2, 1987 | 5–3 | Buffalo Sabres (1986–87) | 30–33–15 |
| 79 | W | April 4, 1987 | 4–1 | Minnesota North Stars (1986–87) | 31–33–15 |
| 80 | W | April 5, 1987 | 3–2 OT | @ Detroit Red Wings (1986–87) | 32–33–15 |

Legend: Win (2 points) Loss (0 points) Tie (1 point)

== Playoffs ==
The Blues lost the Norris Division semifinal series to the Toronto Maple Leafs in six games.

== Player statistics ==
=== Regular season ===
Scoring

| Player | Pos | GP | G | A | Pts | PIM | +/- | PPG | SHG | GWG |
|---|---|---|---|---|---|---|---|---|---|---|
| Doug Gilmour | C | 80 | 42 | 63 | 105 | 58 | -2 | 17 | 1 | 2 |
| Bernie Federko | C | 64 | 20 | 52 | 72 | 32 | -25 | 9 | 0 | 3 |
| Mark Hunter | RW | 74 | 36 | 33 | 69 | 167 | -19 | 12 | 0 | 4 |
| Greg Paslawski | RW | 76 | 29 | 35 | 64 | 27 | 1 | 5 | 1 | 7 |
| Brian Benning | D | 78 | 13 | 36 | 49 | 110 | 2 | 7 | 0 | 2 |
| Gino Cavallini | LW | 80 | 18 | 26 | 44 | 54 | 4 | 4 | 0 | 2 |
| Rick Meagher | C | 80 | 18 | 21 | 39 | 54 | -9 | 2 | 2 | 1 |
| Rob Ramage | D | 59 | 11 | 28 | 39 | 108 | -12 | 6 | 0 | 3 |
| Ron Flockhart | C | 60 | 16 | 19 | 35 | 12 | -9 | 2 | 0 | 2 |
| Doug Wickenheiser | C | 80 | 13 | 15 | 28 | 37 | -22 | 5 | 2 | 1 |
| Ric Nattress | D | 73 | 6 | 22 | 28 | 24 | -34 | 2 | 0 | 0 |
| Cliff Ronning | C | 42 | 11 | 14 | 25 | 6 | -1 | 2 | 0 | 2 |
| Mark Reeds | RW | 68 | 9 | 16 | 25 | 16 | -20 | 1 | 0 | 0 |
| Tim Bothwell | D | 72 | 5 | 16 | 21 | 46 | -14 | 0 | 0 | 1 |
| Jocelyn Lemieux | RW | 53 | 10 | 8 | 18 | 94 | 1 | 1 | 0 | 1 |
| Herb Raglan | RW | 62 | 6 | 10 | 16 | 159 | 6 | 0 | 0 | 0 |
| Bruce Bell | D | 45 | 3 | 13 | 16 | 18 | 3 | 1 | 0 | 0 |
| Doug Evans | LW | 53 | 3 | 13 | 16 | 91 | 2 | 0 | 0 | 0 |
| Charlie Bourgeois | D | 66 | 2 | 12 | 14 | 164 | 16 | 0 | 0 | 1 |
| Jim Pavese | D | 69 | 2 | 9 | 11 | 127 | -21 | 0 | 0 | 0 |
| Brian Sutter | LW | 14 | 3 | 3 | 6 | 18 | -5 | 3 | 0 | 0 |
| Pat Hughes | RW | 43 | 1 | 5 | 6 | 26 | -6 | 0 | 0 | 0 |
| Mike Dark | D | 13 | 2 | 0 | 2 | 2 | 0 | 0 | 0 | 0 |
| Todd Ewen | RW | 23 | 2 | 0 | 2 | 84 | -1 | 0 | 0 | 0 |
| Greg Millen | G | 42 | 0 | 2 | 2 | 12 | 0 | 0 | 0 | 0 |
| Dave Barr | RW | 2 | 0 | 0 | 0 | 0 | 1 | 0 | 0 | 0 |
| Mike Posavad | D | 2 | 0 | 0 | 0 | 0 | 1 | 0 | 0 | 0 |
| Larry Trader | D | 5 | 0 | 0 | 0 | 8 | -5 | 0 | 0 | 0 |
| Rick Wamsley | G | 41 | 0 | 0 | 0 | 10 | 0 | 0 | 0 | 0 |

Goaltending

| Player | MIN | GP | W | L | T | GA | GAA | SO | SA | SV | SV% |
|---|---|---|---|---|---|---|---|---|---|---|---|
| Rick Wamsley | 2410 | 41 | 17 | 15 | 6 | 142 | 3.54 | 0 | 1212 | 1070 | .883 |
| Greg Millen | 2482 | 42 | 15 | 18 | 9 | 146 | 3.53 | 0 | 1152 | 1006 | .873 |
| Team: | 4892 | 80 | 32 | 33 | 15 | 288 | 3.53 | 0 | 2364 | 2076 | .878 |

=== Playoffs ===
Scoring

| Player | Pos | GP | G | A | Pts | PIM | +/- | PPG | SHG | GWG |
|---|---|---|---|---|---|---|---|---|---|---|
| Bernie Federko | C | 6 | 3 | 3 | 6 | 18 | 0 | 1 | 0 | 0 |
| Gino Cavallini | LW | 6 | 3 | 1 | 4 | 2 | 0 | 1 | 0 | 1 |
| Doug Gilmour | C | 6 | 2 | 2 | 4 | 16 | 1 | 1 | 0 | 1 |
| Rob Ramage | D | 6 | 2 | 2 | 4 | 21 | 0 | 2 | 0 | 0 |
| Brian Benning | D | 6 | 0 | 4 | 4 | 9 | 0 | 0 | 0 | 0 |
| Mark Hunter | RW | 5 | 0 | 3 | 3 | 10 | -1 | 0 | 0 | 0 |
| Bruce Bell | D | 4 | 1 | 1 | 2 | 7 | -1 | 0 | 0 | 0 |
| Greg Paslawski | RW | 6 | 1 | 1 | 2 | 4 | -1 | 0 | 0 | 0 |
| Jocelyn Lemieux | RW | 5 | 0 | 1 | 1 | 6 | -1 | 0 | 0 | 0 |
| Mark Reeds | RW | 6 | 0 | 1 | 1 | 2 | 0 | 0 | 0 | 0 |
| Cliff Ronning | C | 4 | 0 | 1 | 1 | 0 | -1 | 0 | 0 | 0 |
| Tim Bothwell | D | 6 | 0 | 0 | 0 | 6 | -5 | 0 | 0 | 0 |
| Charlie Bourgeois | D | 6 | 0 | 0 | 0 | 27 | -3 | 0 | 0 | 0 |
| Doug Evans | LW | 5 | 0 | 0 | 0 | 10 | -2 | 0 | 0 | 0 |
| Todd Ewen | RW | 4 | 0 | 0 | 0 | 23 | 0 | 0 | 0 | 0 |
| Tony Hrkac | C | 3 | 0 | 0 | 0 | 0 | 0 | 0 | 0 | 0 |
| Rick Meagher | C | 6 | 0 | 0 | 0 | 11 | -4 | 0 | 0 | 0 |
| Greg Millen | G | 4 | 0 | 0 | 0 | 0 | 0 | 0 | 0 | 0 |
| Ric Nattress | D | 6 | 0 | 0 | 0 | 2 | -3 | 0 | 0 | 0 |
| Jim Pavese | D | 2 | 0 | 0 | 0 | 2 | -1 | 0 | 0 | 0 |
| Herb Raglan | RW | 4 | 0 | 0 | 0 | 2 | -3 | 0 | 0 | 0 |
| Rick Wamsley | G | 2 | 0 | 0 | 0 | 0 | 0 | 0 | 0 | 0 |
| Doug Wickenheiser | C | 6 | 0 | 0 | 0 | 2 | -3 | 0 | 0 | 0 |

Goaltending

| Player | MIN | GP | W | L | GA | GAA | SO | SA | SV | SV% |
|---|---|---|---|---|---|---|---|---|---|---|
| Greg Millen | 250 | 4 | 1 | 3 | 10 | 2.40 | 0 | 122 | 112 | .918 |
| Rick Wamsley | 120 | 2 | 1 | 1 | 5 | 2.50 | 0 | 54 | 49 | .907 |
| Team: | 370 | 6 | 2 | 4 | 15 | 2.43 | 0 | 176 | 161 | .915 |

Note:

Pos = Position;GP = Games played; G = Goals; A = Assists; Pts = Points; PIM = Penalty minutes; +/- = Plus/minus; PPG = Power-play goals; SHG = Short-handed goals; GWG = Game-winning goals
Pos = Position;GP = Games played; Min, TOI = Minutes played; W = Wins; L = Losses; T,T/OT = Ties; OTL = Overtime losses; GA = Goals-against; GAA = Goals-against average; SO = Shutouts; SA = Shots against; SV = Shots saved;SV% = Save percentage;

== Draft picks ==
St. Louis's draft picks at the 1986 NHL entry draft held at the Montreal Forum in Montreal.

| Round | # | Player | Nationality | College/Junior/Club team (League) |
|---|---|---|---|---|
| 1 | 10 | Jocelyn Lemieux | Canada | Laval Voisins (QMJHL) |
| 2 | 31 | Mike Posma | United States | Buffalo Jr. Sabres (OPJHL) |
| 3 | 52 | Tony Hejna | United States | Nichols School (USHS-NY) |
| 4 | 73 | Glen Featherstone | Canada | Windsor Compuware Spitfires (OHL) |
| 5 | 87 | Mike Wolak | United States | Kitchener Rangers (OHL) |
| 6 | 115 | Mike O'Toole | Canada | Markham Waxers (OJHL) |
| 7 | 136 | Andy May | Canada | Bramalea Blues (MetJHL) |
| 8 | 157 | Randy Skarda | United States | Saint Thomas Academy (USHS-MN) |
| 9 | 178 | Martyn Ball | Canada | St. Michael's Buzzers (MetJHL) |
| 10 | 199 | Rod Thacker | Canada | Hamilton Steelhawks (OHL) |
| 11 | 220 | Terry MacLean | Canada | Longueuil Chevaliers (QMJHL) |
| 12 | 234 | Bill Butler | United States | Northwood School (USHS-NY) |
| 12 | 241 | David O'Brien | United States | Northeastern University (Hockey East) |
| S2 | 13 | Marty Raus | United States | Northeastern University (Hockey East) |

== See also ==
- 1986–87 NHL season
