= 1986–87 Boston Bruins season =

NHL team season

1986–87 Boston Bruins
- Division: 3rd Adams
- Conference: 5th Wales
- 1986–87 record: 39–34–7
- Home record: 25–11–4
- Road record: 14–23–3
- Goals for: 301
- Goals against: 276

Team information
- General manager: Harry Sinden
- Coach: Butch Goring; Terry O'Reilly
- Captain: Ray Bourque; Rick Middleton
- Alternate captains: None
- Arena: Boston Garden

Team leaders
- Goals: Cam Neely (36)
- Assists: Ray Bourque (72)
- Points: Ray Bourque (95)
- Penalty minutes: Nevin Markwart (225)
- Plus/minus: Ray Bourque (44)
- Wins: Doug Keans (18)
- Goals against average: Doug Keans & Bill Ranford (3.34)

The 1986–87 Boston Bruins season was the Bruins' 63rd season.

== Regular season ==
=== Final standings ===
Adams Division
	GP	W	L	T	GF	GA	Pts
**Hartford Whalers**	80	43	30	7	287	270	93
**Montreal Canadiens**	80	41	29	10	277	241	92
**Boston Bruins**	80	39	34	7	301	276	85
**Quebec Nordiques**	80	31	39	10	267	276	72
Buffalo Sabres	80	28	44	8	280	308	64

Note: GP = Games played, W = Wins, L = Losses, T = Ties, Pts = Points, GF = Goals for, GA = Goals against
Note: Teams that qualified for the playoffs are highlighted in bold.

=== Record vs. opponents ===
Adams Division record vs. opponents

==== Vs. Wales Conference ====
**Vs. Adams Division**

1986–87 NHL records
Team	**BOS**	**BUF**	**HFD**	**MTL**	**QUE**	**Total**
Boston	—	3–4–1	2–6	2–5–1	6–2	**13–17–2**
Buffalo	4–3–1	—	4–4	1–5–2	3–4–1	**12–16–4**
Hartford	6–2	4–4	—	4–3–1	3–3–2	**17–12–3**
Montreal	5–2–1	5–1–2	3–4−1	—	5–3	**18–10–4**
Quebec	2–6	4–3–1	3–3–2	3–5	—	**12–17–3**

**Vs. Patrick Division**

1986–87 NHL records
Team	**NJD**	**NYI**	**NYR**	**PHI**	**PIT**	**WSH**	**Total**
Boston	1–1–1	2–0–1	1–2	1–2	2–1	1–1–1	**8–7–3**
Buffalo	2–1	1–1–1	1–2	1–2	0–2–1	2–1	**7–9–2**
Hartford	1–1–1	2–1	3–0	2–1	3–0	2–1	**13–4–1**
Montreal	2–1	1–1–1	2–0–1	0–2–1	1–1–1	0–3	**6–8–4**
Quebec	1–0–2	1–2	1–2	0–2–1	0–3	2–0–1	**5–9–4**

==== Vs. Campbell Conference ====
**Vs. Norris Division**

1986–87 NHL records
Team	**CHI**	**DET**	**MIN**	**STL**	**TOR**	**Total**
Boston	1–1–1	0–2–1	3–0	2–1	2–1	**8–5–2**
Buffalo	2–1	2–0–1	0–3	1–2	0–2–1	**5–8–2**
Hartford	1–2	1–1–1	1–2	2–1	2–1	**7–7–1**
Montreal	2–0–1	1–1–1	2–1	2–1	2–1	**9–4–2**
Quebec	2–1	1–2	2–0–1	0–3	3–0	**8–6–1**

**Vs. Smythe Division**

1986–87 NHL records
Team	**CGY**	**EDM**	**LAK**	**VAN**	**WIN**	**Total**
Boston	2–1	2–1	2–1	2–1	2–1	**10–5–0**
Buffalo	0–3	1–2	2–1	0–3	1–2	**4–11–0**
Hartford	1–2	1–2	1–2	2–0–1	1–1–1	**6–7–2**
Montreal	2–1	0–3	3–0	1–2	2–1	**8–7–0**
Quebec	1–2	0–3	3–0	2–1	0–1–2	**6–7–2**

== Schedule and results ==
1986–87 regular season
October

Game	Result	Date	Score	Opponent	Record
1	L	October 9, 1986	3–5	Calgary Flames (1986–87)	0–1–0
2	L	October 11, 1986	4–5	@ New Jersey Devils (1986–87)	0–2–0
3	W	October 12, 1986	7–2	Hartford Whalers (1986–87)	1–2–0
4	W	October 14, 1986	2–1	@ Winnipeg Jets (1986–87)	2–2–0
5	W	October 16, 1986	5–3	@ Minnesota North Stars (1986–87)	3–2–0
6	W	October 18, 1986	4–1	@ Los Angeles Kings (1986–87)	4–2–0
7	L	October 22, 1986	1–5	@ Vancouver Canucks (1986–87)	4–3–0
8	L	October 24, 1986	2–6	@ Edmonton Oilers (1986–87)	4–4–0
9	W	October 26, 1986	6–0	@ Calgary Flames (1986–87)	5–4–0
10	T	October 30, 1986	3–3 OT	Montreal Canadiens (1986–87)	5–4–1

November

Game	Result	Date	Score	Opponent	Record
11	L	November 1, 1986	2–4	@ Philadelphia Flyers (1986–87)	5–5–1
12	L	November 2, 1986	1–7	Buffalo Sabres (1986–87)	5–6–1
13	L	November 5, 1986	3–8	@ Buffalo Sabres (1986–87)	5–7–1
14	W	November 8, 1986	5–1	@ Quebec Nordiques (1986–87)	6–7–1
15	L	November 12, 1986	1–2	@ Pittsburgh Penguins (1986–87)	6–8–1
16	W	November 13, 1986	4–3 OT	Edmonton Oilers (1986–87)	7–8–1
17	T	November 15, 1986	5–5 OT	New Jersey Devils (1986–87)	7–8–2
18	L	November 17, 1986	2–3 OT	@ Montreal Canadiens (1986–87)	7–9–2
19	T	November 19, 1986	4–4 OT	@ Buffalo Sabres (1986–87)	7–9–3
20	L	November 20, 1986	1–3	Montreal Canadiens (1986–87)	7–10–3
21	W	November 22, 1986	6–5	St. Louis Blues (1986–87)	8–10–3
22	W	November 24, 1986	3–2	@ Toronto Maple Leafs (1986–87)	9–10–3
23	T	November 26, 1986	2–2 OT	@ Washington Capitals (1986–87)	9–10–4
24	L	November 28, 1986	3–4	@ Buffalo Sabres (1986–87)	9–11–4
25	W	November 29, 1986	6–2	Buffalo Sabres (1986–87)	10–11–4

December

Game	Result	Date	Score	Opponent	Record
26	W	December 4, 1986	3–2	Quebec Nordiques (1986–87)	11–11–4
27	W	December 6, 1986	5–0	Philadelphia Flyers (1986–87)	12–11–4
28	W	December 7, 1986	3–1	New York Islanders (1986–87)	13–11–4
29	W	December 11, 1986	4–2	Vancouver Canucks (1986–87)	14–11–4
30	W	December 13, 1986	4–2	@ Montreal Canadiens (1986–87)	15–11–4
31	W	December 14, 1986	6–2	@ Quebec Nordiques (1986–87)	16–11–4
32	L	December 18, 1986	5–6	Hartford Whalers (1986–87)	16–12–4
33	L	December 20, 1986	2–6	Chicago Blackhawks (1986–87)	16–13–4
34	L	December 23, 1986	0–2	@ Hartford Whalers (1986–87)	16–14–4
35	L	December 27, 1986	1–2 OT	@ Los Angeles Kings (1986–87)	16–15–4
36	L	December 30, 1986	3–4	@ St. Louis Blues (1986–87)	16–16–4

January

Game	Result	Date	Score	Opponent	Record
37	W	January 2, 1987	7–2	@ New Jersey Devils (1986–87)	17–16–4
38	W	January 3, 1987	5–4	@ New York Islanders (1986–87)	18–16–4
39	L	January 5, 1987	1–2	Montreal Canadiens (1986–87)	18–17–4
40	T	January 8, 1987	4–4 OT	Detroit Red Wings (1986–87)	18–17–5
41	L	January 10, 1987	4–5	Philadelphia Flyers (1986–87)	18–18–5
42	W	January 12, 1987	4–1	New York Rangers (1986–87)	19–18–5
43	L	January 14, 1987	1–3	@ Hartford Whalers (1986–87)	19–19–5
44	W	January 15, 1987	6–4	Hartford Whalers (1986–87)	20–19–5
45	W	January 17, 1987	4–2	Pittsburgh Penguins (1986–87)	21–19–5
46	W	January 20, 1987	5–3	@ Quebec Nordiques (1986–87)	22–19–5
47	W	January 22, 1987	7–3	Montreal Canadiens (1986–87)	23–19–5
48	W	January 24, 1987	5–3	Calgary Flames (1986–87)	24–19–5
49	W	January 26, 1987	6–2	Buffalo Sabres (1986–87)	25–19–5
50	L	January 29, 1987	3–6	Hartford Whalers (1986–87)	25–20–5
51	W	January 31, 1987	6–3	Winnipeg Jets (1986–87)	26–20–5

February

Game	Result	Date	Score	Opponent	Record
52	L	February 1, 1987	4–5	@ New York Rangers (1986–87)	26–21–5
53	W	February 5, 1987	6–5	Pittsburgh Penguins (1986–87)	27–21–5
54	W	February 7, 1987	8–5	Toronto Maple Leafs (1986–87)	28–21–5
55	L	February 8, 1987	1–2	Quebec Nordiques (1986–87)	28–22–5
56	L	February 14, 1987	4–5	@ Toronto Maple Leafs (1986–87)	28–23–5
57	L	February 16, 1987	3–7	@ Montreal Canadiens (1986–87)	28–24–5
58	L	February 18, 1987	3–4	@ Buffalo Sabres (1986–87)	28–25–5
59	L	February 20, 1987	2–6	@ Winnipeg Jets (1986–87)	28–26–5
60	W	February 21, 1987	1–0	@ Minnesota North Stars (1986–87)	29–26–5
61	L	February 25, 1987	4–6	@ Hartford Whalers (1986–87)	29–27–5
62	W	February 26, 1987	6–2	Quebec Nordiques (1986–87)	30–27–5
63	W	February 28, 1987	5–1	Buffalo Sabres (1986–87)	31–27–5

March

Game	Result	Date	Score	Opponent	Record
64	L	March 2, 1987	3–4 OT	Detroit Red Wings (1986–87)	31–28–5
65	T	March 3, 1987	4–4 OT	@ New York Islanders (1986–87)	31–28–6
66	L	March 5, 1987	2–10	@ Hartford Whalers (1986–87)	31–29–6
67	W	March 7, 1987	3–2 OT	Washington Capitals (1986–87)	32–29–6
68	L	March 11, 1987	2–3	@ New York Rangers (1986–87)	32–30–6
69	W	March 12, 1987	6–4	St. Louis Blues (1986–87)	33–30–6
70	T	March 14, 1987	4–4 OT	Chicago Blackhawks (1986–87)	33–30–7
71	L	March 17, 1987	1–3	@ Detroit Red Wings (1986–87)	33–31–7
72	W	March 19, 1987	6–2	Minnesota North Stars (1986–87)	34–31–7
73	W	March 21, 1987	8–6	Los Angeles Kings (1986–87)	35–31–7
74	L	March 22, 1987	3–4	@ Washington Capitals (1986–87)	35–32–7
75	W	March 26, 1987	4–1	Edmonton Oilers (1986–87)	36–32–7
76	W	March 28, 1987	2–1	Vancouver Canucks (1986–87)	37–32–7
77	W	March 29, 1987	8–6	@ Chicago Blackhawks (1986–87)	38–32–7
78	W	March 31, 1987	4–3	@ Quebec Nordiques (1986–87)	39–32–7

April

Game	Result	Date	Score	Opponent	Record
79	L	April 4, 1987	1–3	@ Montreal Canadiens (1986–87)	39–33–7
80	L	April 5, 1987	4–6	Quebec Nordiques (1986–87)	39–34–7

Legend: Win (2 points) Loss (0 points) Tie (1 point)

=== Notable games ===
- November 20 – "Brawl in the Hallway"; Near the end of the second period, Chris Nilan while leaving the ice on a game misconduct for fighting and takes a swing at Ken Linseman on the Boston bench, igniting a brawl that spills up the runaway leading to the dressing rooms. Nilan and Ryan Walter are suspended for three games while Claude Lemieux sits for one game. The Canadiens are fined $9,000 and the Bruins $5,000 while the players' fines total $4,400.

== Playoffs ==
1987 Stanley Cup playoffs
Adams Division Semifinals vs. (A2) Montreal Canadiens – Canadiens win 4–0

Game	Date	Visitor	Score	Home	Record
1	April 8	Boston Bruins	2–6	Montreal Canadiens	0–1
2	April 9	Boston Bruins	3–4 (OT)	Montreal Canadiens	0–2
3	April 11	Montreal Canadiens	5–4	Boston Bruins	0–3
4	April 12	Montreal Canadiens	4–2	Boston Bruins	0–4

Legend: Win Loss

== Player statistics ==
=== Regular season ===
Scoring

Player	Pos	GP	G	A	Pts	PIM	+/-	PPG	SHG	GWG
Ray Bourque	D	78	23	72	95	36	44	6	1	3
Cam Neely	RW	75	36	36	72	143	23	7	0	3
Charlie Simmer	LW	80	29	40	69	59	20	11	0	4
Rick Middleton	RW	76	31	37	68	6	7	4	4	3
Tom McCarthy	LW	68	30	29	59	31	10	7	0	6
Keith Crowder	RW	58	22	30	52	106	20	4	0	5
Steve Kasper	C	79	20	30	50	51	-4	4	2	2
Ken Linseman	C	64	15	34	49	126	15	3	0	3
Thomas Gradin	C	64	12	31	43	18	4	2	3	3
Geoff Courtnall	LW	65	13	23	36	117	-4	2	0	1
Reed Larson	D	66	12	24	36	95	9	9	0	1
Greg Johnston	RW	76	12	15	27	79	-7	0	0	1
Mike Milbury	D	68	6	16	22	96	22	0	1	1
Michael Thelven	D	34	5	15	20	18	-2	3	0	0
Nevin Markwart	LW	64	10	9	19	225	-6	0	0	2
Dwight Foster	RW	47	4	12	16	37	1	0	1	0
Paul Boutilier	D	52	5	9	14	84	-2	1	1	0
Allen Pedersen	D	79	1	11	12	71	-15	0	0	0
Kraig Nienhuis	LW	16	4	2	6	2	-5	2	0	0
Dave Reid	LW	12	3	3	6	0	-1	0	0	0
Bob Sweeney	C/RW	14	2	4	6	21	-5	0	0	0
Lyndon Byers	RW	18	2	3	5	53	-1	0	0	0
Randy Burridge	LW	23	1	4	5	16	-6	0	0	1
Jay Miller	LW	55	1	4	5	208	-11	0	0	0
Mats Thelin	D	59	1	3	4	69	-8	0	0	0
Wade Campbell	D	14	0	3	3	24	-1	0	0	0
Doug Keans	G	36	0	2	2	24	0	0	0	0
Frank Simonetti	D	25	1	0	1	17	-6	0	0	0
John Carter	LW	8	0	1	1	0	3	0	0	0
Bill Ranford	G	41	0	1	1	8	0	0	0	0
Alain Cote	D	3	0	0	0	0	-1	0	0	0
Cleon Daskalakis	G	2	0	0	0	0	0	0	0	0
Pat Riggin	G	10	0	0	0	0	0	0	0	0
Roberto Romano	G	1	0	0	0	0	0	0	0	0

Goaltending

Player	MIN	GP	W	L	T	GA	GAA	SO	SA	SV	SV%
Doug Keans	1942	36	18	8	4	108	3.34	0	909	801	.881
Bill Ranford	2234	41	16	20	2	124	3.33	3	1137	1013	.891
Pat Riggin	513	10	3	5	1	29	3.39	0	236	207	.877
Cleon Daskalakis	97	2	2	0	0	7	4.33	0	51	44	.863
Roberto Romano	60	1	0	1	0	6	6.00	0	34	28	.824
Team:	4846	80	39	34	7	274	3.39	3	2367	2093	.884

=== Playoffs ===
Scoring

Player	Pos	GP	G	A	Pts	PIM	+/-	PPG	SHG	GWG
Cam Neely	RW	4	5	1	6	8	-1	3	0	0
Rick Middleton	RW	4	2	2	4	0	-1	1	1	0
Thomas Gradin	C	4	0	4	4	0	-1	0	0	0
Ray Bourque	D	4	1	2	3	0	-1	0	0	0
Ken Linseman	C	4	1	1	2	22	-2	0	0	0
Tom McCarthy	LW	4	1	1	2	4	-4	1	0	0
Steve Kasper	C	3	0	2	2	0	-4	0	0	0
Reed Larson	D	4	0	2	2	2	-6	0	0	0
Randy Burridge	LW	2	1	0	1	2	-2	0	0	0
Keith Crowder	RW	4	0	1	1	4	-1	0	0	0
Lyndon Byers	RW	1	0	0	0	0	-1	0	0	0
Wade Campbell	D	4	0	0	0	11	-2	0	0	0
Geoff Courtnall	LW	1	0	0	0	0	0	0	0	0
Dwight Foster	RW	3	0	0	0	0	-2	0	0	0
Greg Johnston	RW	4	0	0	0	0	-4	0	0	0
Doug Keans	G	2	0	0	0	4	0	0	0	0
Nevin Markwart	LW	4	0	0	0	9	-3	0	0	0
Mike Milbury	D	4	0	0	0	4	-2	0	0	0
Allen Pedersen	D	4	0	0	0	4	-5	0	0	0
Bill Ranford	G	2	0	0	0	0	0	0	0	0
Dave Reid	LW	2	0	0	0	0	-1	0	0	0
Charlie Simmer	LW	1	0	0	0	2	1	0	0	0
Frank Simonetti	D	4	0	0	0	6	-1	0	0	0
Bob Sweeney	C/RW	3	0	0	0	0	-2	0	0	0

Goaltending

Player	MIN	GP	W	L	GA	GAA	SO	SA	SV	SV%
Doug Keans	120	2	0	2	11	5.50	0	58	47	.810
Bill Ranford	123	2	0	2	8	3.90	0	55	47	.855
Team:	243	4	0	4	19	4.69	0	113	94	.832

Note:

Pos = Position;GP = Games played; G = Goals; A = Assists; Pts = Points; PIM = Penalty minutes; +/- = Plus/minus; PPG = Power-play goals; SHG = Short-handed goals; GWG = Game-winning goals
Pos = Position;GP = Games played; Min, TOI = Minutes played; W = Wins; L = Losses; T,T/OT = Ties; OTL = Overtime losses; GA = Goals-against; GAA = Goals-against average; SO = Shutouts; SA = Shots against; SV = Shots saved;SV% = Save percentage;

== Draft picks ==
Boston's draft picks at the 1986 NHL entry draft held at the Montreal Forum in Montreal.

Round	#	Player	Nationality	College/Junior/Club team (League)
1	13	Craig Janney	United States	Boston College (Hockey East)
2	34	Pekka Tirkkonen	Finland	SaPKo (Finland)
4	76	Dean Hall	Canada	St. James Canadians (MJHL)
5	97	Matt Pesklewis	Canada	St. Albert Saints (AJHL)
6	118	Garth Premak	Canada	New Westminster Bruins (WHL)
7	139	Paul Beraldo	Canada	Sault Ste. Marie Greyhounds (OHL)
8	160	Brian Ferreira	United States	Falmouth High School (MIAA)
9	181	Jeff Flaherty	United States	Weymouth High School (MIAA)
10	202	Greg Hawgood	Canada	Kamloops Blazers (WHL)
11	223	Staffan Malmqvist	Sweden	Leksands IF (Sweden)
12	244	Joel Gardner	Canada	Sarnia Legionnaires (WOJBHL)
S2	16	Chris Olson	United States	University of Denver (WCHA)

== See also ==
- 1986–87 NHL season
