= 1986–87 Buffalo Sabres season =

NHL hockey team season

1986–87 Buffalo Sabres
- Division: 5th Adams
- Conference: 10th Wales
- 1986–87 record: 28–44–8
- Home record: 18–18–4
- Road record: 10–26–4
- Goals for: 280
- Goals against: 308

Team information
- General manager: Scotty Bowman; Gerry Meehan
- Coach: Scotty Bowman; Craig Ramsay; Gerry Meehan
- Captain: Gilbert Perreault (Oct–Nov); Lindy Ruff (Nov–Apr)
- Alternate captains: Mike Foligno; Mike Ramsey; Lindy Ruff (Oct–Nov)
- Arena: Buffalo Memorial Auditorium

Team leaders
- Goals: Mike Foligno (30)
- Assists: Dave Andreychuk (48)
- Points: Dave Andreychuk (73)
- Penalty minutes: Steve Dykstra (179)
- Plus/minus: Mike Foligno (13)
- Wins: Tom Barrasso (17)
- Goals against average: Tom Barrasso (3.34)

The 1986–87 Buffalo Sabres season was the 17th season for the National Hockey League (NHL) franchise that was established on May 22, 1970. The team's first ever draft pick and franchise icon Gilbert Perrault played his final games for the team before retiring early in the season as the Sabres failed to qualify for the playoffs for the second consecutive year.

== Regular season ==
=== Final standings ===
Adams Division
| | GP | W | L | T | GF | GA | Pts |
|---|---|---|---|---|---|---|---|
| **Hartford Whalers** | 80 | 43 | 30 | 7 | 287 | 270 | 93 |
| **Montreal Canadiens** | 80 | 41 | 29 | 10 | 277 | 241 | 92 |
| **Boston Bruins** | 80 | 39 | 34 | 7 | 301 | 276 | 85 |
| **Quebec Nordiques** | 80 | 31 | 39 | 10 | 267 | 276 | 72 |
| Buffalo Sabres | 80 | 28 | 44 | 8 | 280 | 308 | 64 |

Note: GP = Games played, W = Wins, L = Losses, T = Ties, Pts = Points, GF = Goals for, GA = Goals against
Note: Teams that qualified for the playoffs are highlighted in bold.

=== Record vs. opponents ===
Adams Division record vs. opponents

==== Vs. Wales Conference ====
**Vs. Adams Division**

1986–87 NHL records
| Team | **BOS** | **BUF** | **HFD** | **MTL** | **QUE** | **Total** |
|---|---|---|---|---|---|---|
| Boston | — | 3–4–1 | 2–6 | 2–5–1 | 6–2 | **13–17–2** |
| Buffalo | 4–3–1 | — | 4–4 | 1–5–2 | 3–4–1 | **12–16–4** |
| Hartford | 6–2 | 4–4 | — | 4–3–1 | 3–3–2 | **17–12–3** |
| Montreal | 5–2–1 | 5–1–2 | 3–4−1 | — | 5–3 | **18–10–4** |
| Quebec | 2–6 | 4–3–1 | 3–3–2 | 3–5 | — | **12–17–3** |

**Vs. Patrick Division**

1986–87 NHL records
| Team | **NJD** | **NYI** | **NYR** | **PHI** | **PIT** | **WSH** | **Total** |
|---|---|---|---|---|---|---|---|
| Boston | 1–1–1 | 2–0–1 | 1–2 | 1–2 | 2–1 | 1–1–1 | **8–7–3** |
| Buffalo | 2–1 | 1–1–1 | 1–2 | 1–2 | 0–2–1 | 2–1 | **7–9–2** |
| Hartford | 1–1–1 | 2–1 | 3–0 | 2–1 | 3–0 | 2–1 | **13–4–1** |
| Montreal | 2–1 | 1–1–1 | 2–0–1 | 0–2–1 | 1–1–1 | 0–3 | **6–8–4** |
| Quebec | 1–0–2 | 1–2 | 1–2 | 0–2–1 | 0–3 | 2–0–1 | **5–9–4** |

==== Vs. Campbell Conference ====
**Vs. Norris Division**

1986–87 NHL records
| Team | **CHI** | **DET** | **MIN** | **STL** | **TOR** | **Total** |
|---|---|---|---|---|---|---|
| Boston | 1–1–1 | 0–2–1 | 3–0 | 2–1 | 2–1 | **8–5–2** |
| Buffalo | 2–1 | 2–0–1 | 0–3 | 1–2 | 0–2–1 | **5–8–2** |
| Hartford | 1–2 | 1–1–1 | 1–2 | 2–1 | 2–1 | **7–7–1** |
| Montreal | 2–0–1 | 1–1–1 | 2–1 | 2–1 | 2–1 | **9–4–2** |
| Quebec | 2–1 | 1–2 | 2–0–1 | 0–3 | 3–0 | **8–6–1** |

**Vs. Smythe Division**

1986–87 NHL records
| Team | **CGY** | **EDM** | **LAK** | **VAN** | **WIN** | **Total** |
|---|---|---|---|---|---|---|
| Boston | 2–1 | 2–1 | 2–1 | 2–1 | 2–1 | **10–5–0** |
| Buffalo | 0–3 | 1–2 | 2–1 | 0–3 | 1–2 | **4–11–0** |
| Hartford | 1–2 | 1–2 | 1–2 | 2–0–1 | 1–1–1 | **6–7–2** |
| Montreal | 2–1 | 0–3 | 3–0 | 1–2 | 2–1 | **8–7–0** |
| Quebec | 1–2 | 0–3 | 3–0 | 2–1 | 0–1–2 | **6–7–2** |

== Schedule and results ==
1986–87 regular season
October

| Game | Result | Date | Score | Opponent | Record |
|---|---|---|---|---|---|
| 1 | L | October 9, 1986 | 2–3 | @ Winnipeg Jets (1986–87) | 0–1–0 |
| 2 | T | October 11, 1986 | 5–5 OT | @ Toronto Maple Leafs (1986–87) | 0–1–1 |
| 3 | L | October 12, 1986 | 2–4 | Calgary Flames (1986–87) | 0–2–1 |
| 4 | T | October 15, 1986 | 0–0 OT | Montreal Canadiens (1986–87) | 0–2–2 |
| 5 | L | October 17, 1986 | 3–7 | Pittsburgh Penguins (1986–87) | 0–3–2 |
| 6 | W | October 18, 1986 | 4–2 | @ Washington Capitals (1986–87) | 1–3–2 |
| 7 | L | October 22, 1986 | 4–5 OT | @ Pittsburgh Penguins (1986–87) | 1–4–2 |
| 8 | L | October 24, 1986 | 4–5 | Hartford Whalers (1986–87) | 1–5–2 |
| 9 | L | October 25, 1986 | 2–3 | @ Hartford Whalers (1986–87) | 1–6–2 |
| 10 | L | October 29, 1986 | 2–5 | @ Montreal Canadiens (1986–87) | 1–7–2 |

November

| Game | Result | Date | Score | Opponent | Record |
|---|---|---|---|---|---|
| 11 | W | November 1, 1986 | 3–1 | @ New Jersey Devils (1986–87) | 2–7–2 |
| 12 | W | November 2, 1986 | 7–1 | @ Boston Bruins (1986–87) | 3–7–2 |
| 13 | W | November 5, 1986 | 8–3 | Boston Bruins (1986–87) | 4–7–2 |
| 14 | L | November 7, 1986 | 6–7 | Vancouver Canucks (1986–87) | 4–8–2 |
| 15 | L | November 9, 1986 | 3–4 | New York Islanders (1986–87) | 4–9–2 |
| 16 | L | November 12, 1986 | 1–2 OT | @ New York Rangers (1986–87) | 4–10–2 |
| 17 | L | November 15, 1986 | 2–4 | @ Montreal Canadiens (1986–87) | 4–11–2 |
| 18 | T | November 19, 1986 | 4–4 OT | Boston Bruins (1986–87) | 4–11–3 |
| 19 | L | November 21, 1986 | 1–6 | Quebec Nordiques (1986–87) | 4–12–3 |
| 20 | L | November 22, 1986 | 1–3 | @ Quebec Nordiques (1986–87) | 4–13–3 |
| 21 | L | November 26, 1986 | 0–3 | @ Hartford Whalers (1986–87) | 4–14–3 |
| 22 | W | November 28, 1986 | 4–3 | Boston Bruins (1986–87) | 5–14–3 |
| 23 | L | November 29, 1986 | 2–6 | @ Boston Bruins (1986–87) | 5–15–3 |

December

| Game | Result | Date | Score | Opponent | Record |
|---|---|---|---|---|---|
| 24 | L | December 2, 1986 | 4–5 | Minnesota North Stars (1986–87) | 5–16–3 |
| 25 | L | December 5, 1986 | 5–6 | St. Louis Blues (1986–87) | 5–17–3 |
| 26 | L | December 6, 1986 | 3–4 | @ New Jersey Devils (1986–87) | 5–18–3 |
| 27 | T | December 9, 1986 | 5–5 OT | @ Detroit Red Wings (1986–87) | 5–18–4 |
| 28 | L | December 10, 1986 | 3–6 | @ Chicago Blackhawks (1986–87) | 5–19–4 |
| 29 | L | December 13, 1986 | 0–7 | @ Quebec Nordiques (1986–87) | 5–20–4 |
| 30 | W | December 14, 1986 | 4–3 | Hartford Whalers (1986–87) | 6–20–4 |
| 31 | L | December 17, 1986 | 3–4 | @ Hartford Whalers (1986–87) | 6–21–4 |
| 32 | W | December 19, 1986 | 3–2 | Montreal Canadiens (1986–87) | 7–21–4 |
| 33 | L | December 20, 1986 | 4–5 OT | @ Toronto Maple Leafs (1986–87) | 7–22–4 |
| 34 | W | December 23, 1986 | 2–1 | Philadelphia Flyers (1986–87) | 8–22–4 |
| 35 | T | December 26, 1986 | 3–3 OT | Pittsburgh Penguins (1986–87) | 8–22–5 |
| 36 | L | December 28, 1986 | 1–4 | Calgary Flames (1986–87) | 8–23–5 |
| 37 | W | December 31, 1986 | 5–2 | Chicago Blackhawks (1986–87) | 9–23–5 |

January

| Game | Result | Date | Score | Opponent | Record |
|---|---|---|---|---|---|
| 38 | L | January 2, 1987 | 3–6 | Winnipeg Jets (1986–87) | 9–24–5 |
| 39 | W | January 4, 1987 | 7–2 | Quebec Nordiques (1986–87) | 10–24–5 |
| 40 | W | January 7, 1987 | 4–2 | @ Winnipeg Jets (1986–87) | 11–24–5 |
| 41 | L | January 8, 1987 | 4–5 OT | @ Minnesota North Stars (1986–87) | 11–25–5 |
| 42 | W | January 10, 1987 | 8–5 | @ Los Angeles Kings (1986–87) | 12–25–5 |
| 43 | T | January 14, 1987 | 3–3 OT | Montreal Canadiens (1986–87) | 12–25–6 |
| 44 | L | January 17, 1987 | 2–4 | @ Montreal Canadiens (1986–87) | 12–26–6 |
| 45 | W | January 18, 1987 | 6–5 OT | Edmonton Oilers (1986–87) | 13–26–6 |
| 46 | L | January 20, 1987 | 0–5 | @ Minnesota North Stars (1986–87) | 13–27–6 |
| 47 | L | January 23, 1987 | 2–3 | Washington Capitals (1986–87) | 13–28–6 |
| 48 | W | January 24, 1987 | 6–3 | @ Washington Capitals (1986–87) | 14–28–6 |
| 49 | L | January 26, 1987 | 2–6 | @ Boston Bruins (1986–87) | 14–29–6 |
| 50 | L | January 28, 1987 | 4–7 | Philadelphia Flyers (1986–87) | 14–30–6 |
| 51 | W | January 30, 1987 | 3–1 | Quebec Nordiques (1986–87) | 15–30–6 |

February

| Game | Result | Date | Score | Opponent | Record |
|---|---|---|---|---|---|
| 52 | W | February 1, 1987 | 6–1 | Detroit Red Wings (1986–87) | 16–30–6 |
| 53 | W | February 4, 1987 | 3–1 | @ Hartford Whalers (1986–87) | 17–30–6 |
| 54 | L | February 7, 1987 | 2–5 | @ Quebec Nordiques (1986–87) | 17–31–6 |
| 55 | W | February 8, 1987 | 7–4 | Chicago Blackhawks (1986–87) | 18–31–6 |
| 56 | W | February 14, 1987 | 5–1 | @ New York Islanders (1986–87) | 19–31–6 |
| 57 | W | February 18, 1987 | 4–3 | Boston Bruins (1986–87) | 20–31–6 |
| 58 | W | February 20, 1987 | 6–3 | @ New York Rangers (1986–87) | 21–31–6 |
| 59 | W | February 22, 1987 | 5–3 | Hartford Whalers (1986–87) | 22–31–6 |
| 60 | L | February 24, 1987 | 3–6 | New York Rangers (1986–87) | 22–32–6 |
| 61 | W | February 26, 1987 | 4–3 | St. Louis Blues (1986–87) | 23–32–6 |
| 62 | L | February 28, 1987 | 1–5 | @ Boston Bruins (1986–87) | 23–33–6 |

March

| Game | Result | Date | Score | Opponent | Record |
|---|---|---|---|---|---|
| 63 | L | March 1, 1987 | 2–4 | Vancouver Canucks (1986–87) | 23–34–6 |
| 64 | L | March 3, 1987 | 2–4 | @ Philadelphia Flyers (1986–87) | 23–35–6 |
| 65 | W | March 5, 1987 | 6–4 | New Jersey Devils (1986–87) | 24–35–6 |
| 66 | T | March 7, 1987 | 5–5 OT | @ Quebec Nordiques (1986–87) | 24–35–7 |
| 67 | W | March 8, 1987 | 5–1 | Quebec Nordiques (1986–87) | 25–35–7 |
| 68 | W | March 11, 1987 | 3–2 | @ Los Angeles Kings (1986–87) | 26–35–7 |
| 69 | L | March 13, 1987 | 4–6 | @ Vancouver Canucks (1986–87) | 26–36–7 |
| 70 | L | March 14, 1987 | 3–5 | @ Edmonton Oilers (1986–87) | 26–37–7 |
| 71 | L | March 17, 1987 | 2–6 | @ Calgary Flames (1986–87) | 26–38–7 |
| 72 | L | March 20, 1987 | 2–3 | Montreal Canadiens (1986–87) | 26–39–7 |
| 73 | W | March 22, 1987 | 3–2 | Detroit Red Wings (1986–87) | 27–39–7 |
| 74 | L | March 24, 1987 | 5–6 | Toronto Maple Leafs (1986–87) | 27–40–7 |
| 75 | L | March 26, 1987 | 3–5 | Los Angeles Kings (1986–87) | 27–41–7 |
| 76 | L | March 28, 1987 | 3–6 | @ Montreal Canadiens (1986–87) | 27–42–7 |
| 77 | L | March 29, 1987 | 2–3 | Edmonton Oilers (1986–87) | 27–43–7 |

April

| Game | Result | Date | Score | Opponent | Record |
|---|---|---|---|---|---|
| 78 | L | April 2, 1987 | 3–5 | @ St. Louis Blues (1986–87) | 27–44–7 |
| 79 | T | April 4, 1987 | 6–6 OT | @ New York Islanders (1986–87) | 27–44–8 |
| 80 | W | April 5, 1987 | 6–0 | Hartford Whalers (1986–87) | 28–44–8 |

Legend: Win (2 points) Loss (0 points) Tie (1 point)

== Draft picks ==
Buffalo's draft picks at the 1986 NHL entry draft held at the Montreal Forum in Montreal.

| Round | # | Player | Nationality | College/Junior/Club team (League) |
|---|---|---|---|---|
| 1 | 5 | Shawn Anderson | Canada | Canadian National Development Team |
| 2 | 26 | Greg Brown | United States | St. Mark's School (ISL) |
| 3 | 47 | Bob Corkum | United States | University of Maine (Hockey East) |
| 3 | 56 | Kevin Kerr | Canada | Windsor Compuware Spitfires (OHL) |
| 4 | 68 | David Baseggio | Canada | Yale University (ECAC) |
| 5 | 89 | Larry Rooney | United States | Thayer Academy (ISL) |
| 6 | 110 | Miguel Baldris | Canada | Shawinigan Cataractes (QMJHL) |
| 7 | 131 | Mike Hartman | United States | North Bay Centennials (OHL) |
| 8 | 152 | Francois Guay | Canada | Laval Titan (QMJHL) |
| 9 | 173 | Sean Whitham | Canada | Providence College (Hockey East) |
| 10 | 194 | Kenton Rein | Canada | Prince Albert Raiders (WHL) |
| 11 | 215 | Troy Arndt | Canada | Portland Winter Hawks (WHL) |
| S1 | 4 | Jeff Capello | Canada | University of Vermont (Hockey East) |
| S2 | 8 | John Cullen | Canada | Boston University (Hockey East) |

== See also ==
- 1986–87 NHL season
