= Ken Leiter =

American ice hockey player (born 1961)

- Born: April 19, 1961 (age 65) Detroit, Michigan, U.S.
- Height: 6 ft 1 in (185 cm)
- Weight: 195 lb (88 kg; 13 st 13 lb)
- Position: Defense
- Shot: Left
- Played for: New York Islanders; Minnesota North Stars
- National team: United States
- NHL draft: 101st overall, 1980; New York Islanders
- Playing career: 1983–1990

Kenneth Michael Leiter (born April 19, 1961) is an American former professional ice hockey defenseman who played 143 games in the National Hockey League for the New York Islanders and Minnesota North Stars.

== Career statistics ==
			Regular season					Playoffs
Season	Team	League	GP	G	A	Pts	PIM	GP	G	A	Pts	PIM
1979–80	Michigan State University	NCAA	38	0	10	10	96	—	—	—	—	—
1980–81	Michigan State University	NCAA	31	2	12	14	48	—	—	—	—	—
1981–82	Michigan State University	NCAA	31	7	13	20	50	—	—	—	—	—
1982–83	Michigan State University	NCAA	40	3	28	31	47	—	—	—	—	—
1983–84	Indianapolis Checkers	CHL	68	10	26	36	46	10	3	4	7	0
1984–85	New York Islanders	NHL	5	0	2	2	2	—	—	—	—	—
1984–85	Springfield Indians	AHL	39	3	12	15	12	4	0	3	3	2
1985–86	New York Islanders	NHL	9	1	1	2	6	—	—	—	—	—
1985–86	Springfield Indians	AHL	68	7	27	34	51	—	—	—	—	—
1986–87	New York Islanders	NHL	74	9	20	29	30	11	0	5	5	6
1987–88	New York Islanders	NHL	51	4	13	17	24	4	0	1	1	2
1987–88	Springfield Indians	AHL	2	0	4	4	0	—	—	—	—	—
1988–89	Minnesota North Stars	NHL	4	0	0	0	0	—	—	—	—	—
1988–89	Kalamazoo Wings	IHL	4	1	1	2	0	—	—	—	—	—
NHL totals			143	14	36	50	62	15	0	6	6	8
AHL totals			109	10	43	53	63	4	0	3	3	2

== Awards and honors ==
Award	Year
All-CCHA First Team	1982-83
