= Ari Haanpää =

Finnish ice hockey player

- Born: 28 November 1965 (age 60) Nokia, Finland
- Height: 6 ft 1 in (185 cm)
- Weight: 185 lb (84 kg; 13 st 3 lb)
- Position: Right wing
- Shot: Right
- Played for: Hockey Club de Reims; CE Wien; Tappara; JyP HT; Lukko; New York Islanders; Ilves
- National team: Finland
- NHL draft: 83rd overall, 1984; New York Islanders
- Playing career: 1983–1999; 2001–2002

Ari Eerik Haanpää (born November 28, 1965, in Nokia, Finland) is a retired professional ice hockey player who played in the National Hockey League with the New York Islanders between 1985 and 1988. The rest of his career, which lasted from 1983 to 1999, and briefly in 2001–2002, was mainly spent in the Finnish SM-liiga. Internationally Haanpää played for the Finnish national junior team at two European Junior Championships and two World Junior Championships, winning a silver medal in 1984.

== Career statistics ==
=== Regular season and playoffs ===
			Regular season					Playoffs
Season	Team	League	GP	G	A	Pts	PIM	GP	G	A	Pts	PIM
1981–82	Tappara U20	FIN Jr	23	8	7	15	19	—	—	—	—	—
1982–83	Tappara U20	FIN Jr	21	9	9	18	54	—	—	—	—	—
1983–84	Ilves	FIN	27	0	1	1	8	2	0	0	0	2
1984–85	Ilves	FIN	13	5	0	5	2	9	3	1	4	0
1985–86	New York Islanders	NHL	18	0	7	7	20	—	—	—	—	—
1985–86	Springfield Indians	AHL	30	3	1	4	13	—	—	—	—	—
1986–87	New York Islanders	NHL	41	6	4	10	17	6	0	0	0	10
1987–88	New York Islanders	NHL	1	0	0	0	0	—	—	—	—	—
1987–88	Springfield Indians	AHL	61	14	19	33	34	—	—	—	—	—
1988–89	Lukko	FIN	42	28	19	47	36	—	—	—	—	—
1989–90	Lukko	FIN	24	17	9	26	59	—	—	—	—	—
1990–91	JyP HT	FIN	32	28	17	45	100	5	3	1	4	8
1991–92	JyP HT	FIN	41	21	20	41	70	10	6	2	8	8
1992–93	JyP HT	FIN	44	15	11	26	89	9	1	2	3	4
1993–94	Tappara	FIN	42	21	13	34	72	10	3	6	9	6
1994–95	Tappara	FIN	48	12	12	24	67	—	—	—	—	—
1995–96	Tappara	FIN	45	13	16	29	60	4	3	0	3	8
1996–97	CE Wien	AUT	29	15	13	28	39	—	—	—	—	—
1997–98	GEC Nordhorn	GER-2	33	32	37	69	64	—	—	—	—	—
1998–99	Hockey Club de Reims	FRA	33	19	14	33	76	—	—	—	—	—
2001–02	Kiekko-Ahma	FIN-3	3	2	0	2	2	—	—	—	—	—
FIN totals			358	160	118	278	563	49	19	12	31	36
NHL totals			60	6	11	17	37	6	0	0	0	10

=== International ===
Year	Team	Event	GP	G	A	Pts	PIM
1982	Finland	EJC	5	0	0	0	16
1983	Finland	EJC	5	3	0	3	12
1984	Finland	WJC	7	5	5	10	8
1985	Finland	WJC	7	6	1	7	4
Junior totals			24	14	6	20	40
