= 1986–87 Montreal Canadiens season =

NHL hockey team season

1986–87 Montreal Canadiens
- Division: 2nd Adams
- Conference: 3rd Wales
- 1986–87 record: 41–29–10
- Home record: 27–9–4
- Road record: 14–20–6
- Goals for: 277
- Goals against: 241

Team information
- General manager: Serge Savard
- Coach: Jean Perron
- Captain: Bob Gainey
- Alternate captains: Mats Naslund; Larry Robinson
- Arena: Montreal Forum

Team leaders
- Goals: Bobby Smith (28)
- Assists: Mats Naslund (55)
- Points: Mats Naslund (80)
- Penalty minutes: Chris Nilan (266)
- Plus/minus: Larry Robinson (+24)
- Wins: Patrick Roy (22)
- Goals against average: Brian Hayward (2.81)

The 1986–87 Montreal Canadiens season was the team's 78th season. The season involved being eliminated in the Prince of Wales Conference Final versus the Philadelphia Flyers 4 games to 2, in a series made famous by the pre-game brawl before game 6, after Ed Hospodar attacked Claude Lemieux for shooting a puck into the Flyers empty net at the end of the warmup

== Offseason ==
=== NHL draft ===
Montreal's draft picks at the 1986 NHL entry draft held at the Montreal Forum in Montreal.

Round	#	Player	Nationality	College/Junior/Club team (League)
1	15	Mark Pederson	Canada	Medicine Hat Tigers (WHL)
2	27	Benoit Brunet	Canada	Hull Olympiques (QMJHL)
3	57	Jyrki Lumme	Finland	Ilves (Finland)
4	78	Brent Bobyck	Canada	Notre Dame Hounds (SJHL)
5	94	Eric Aubertin	Canada	Granby Bisons (QMJHL)
5	99	Mario Milani	Canada	Verdun Junior Canadiens (QMJHL)
6	120	Steve Bisson	Canada	Sault Ste. Marie Greyhounds (OHL)
7	141	Lyle Odelein	Canada	Moose Jaw Warriors (WHL)
8	162	Rick Hayward	United States	Hull Olympiques (QMJHL)
9	183	Antonin Routa	Czechoslovakia	Poldi SONP Kladno (Czechoslovakia)
10	204	Eric Bohemier	Canada	Hull Olympiques (QMJHL)
11	225	Charlie Moore	Canada	Belleville Bulls (OHL)
12	246	Karel Svoboda	Czechoslovakia	CHZ Litvinov (Czechoslovakia)
S2	18	Randy Exelby	Canada	Lake Superior State University (CCHA)

== Regular season ==
=== Final standings ===
Adams Division
	GP	W	L	T	GF	GA	Pts
**Hartford Whalers**	80	43	30	7	287	270	93
**Montreal Canadiens**	80	41	29	10	277	241	92
**Boston Bruins**	80	39	34	7	301	276	85
**Quebec Nordiques**	80	31	39	10	267	276	72
Buffalo Sabres	80	28	44	8	280	308	64

Note: GP = Games played, W = Wins, L = Losses, T = Ties, Pts = Points, GF = Goals for, GA = Goals against
Note: Teams that qualified for the playoffs are highlighted in bold.

=== Record vs. opponents ===
Adams Division record vs. opponents

==== Vs. Wales Conference ====
**Vs. Adams Division**

1986–87 NHL records
Team	**BOS**	**BUF**	**HFD**	**MTL**	**QUE**	**Total**
Boston	—	3–4–1	2–6	2–5–1	6–2	**13–17–2**
Buffalo	4–3–1	—	4–4	1–5–2	3–4–1	**12–16–4**
Hartford	6–2	4–4	—	4–3–1	3–3–2	**17–12–3**
Montreal	5–2–1	5–1–2	3–4−1	—	5–3	**18–10–4**
Quebec	2–6	4–3–1	3–3–2	3–5	—	**12–17–3**

**Vs. Patrick Division**

1986–87 NHL records
Team	**NJD**	**NYI**	**NYR**	**PHI**	**PIT**	**WSH**	**Total**
Boston	1–1–1	2–0–1	1–2	1–2	2–1	1–1–1	**8–7–3**
Buffalo	2–1	1–1–1	1–2	1–2	0–2–1	2–1	**7–9–2**
Hartford	1–1–1	2–1	3–0	2–1	3–0	2–1	**13–4–1**
Montreal	2–1	1–1–1	2–0–1	0–2–1	1–1–1	0–3	**6–8–4**
Quebec	1–0–2	1–2	1–2	0–2–1	0–3	2–0–1	**5–9–4**

==== Vs. Campbell Conference ====
**Vs. Norris Division**

1986–87 NHL records
Team	**CHI**	**DET**	**MIN**	**STL**	**TOR**	**Total**
Boston	1–1–1	0–2–1	3–0	2–1	2–1	**8–5–2**
Buffalo	2–1	2–0–1	0–3	1–2	0–2–1	**5–8–2**
Hartford	1–2	1–1–1	1–2	2–1	2–1	**7–7–1**
Montreal	2–0–1	1–1–1	2–1	2–1	2–1	**9–4–2**
Quebec	2–1	1–2	2–0–1	0–3	3–0	**8–6–1**

**Vs. Smythe Division**

1986–87 NHL records
Team	**CGY**	**EDM**	**LAK**	**VAN**	**WIN**	**Total**
Boston	2–1	2–1	2–1	2–1	2–1	**10–5–0**
Buffalo	0–3	1–2	2–1	0–3	1–2	**4–11–0**
Hartford	1–2	1–2	1–2	2–0–1	1–1–1	**6–7–2**
Montreal	2–1	0–3	3–0	1–2	2–1	**8–7–0**
Quebec	1–2	0–3	3–0	2–1	0–1–2	**6–7–2**

== Schedule and results ==
1986–87 regular season
October

Game	Result	Date	Score	Opponent	Record
1	L	October 9, 1986	4–7	@ Toronto Maple Leafs	0–1–0
2	L	October 11, 1986	4–5 OT	Edmonton Oilers	0–2–0
3	W	October 13, 1986	6–4	Minnesota North Stars	1–2–0
4	T	October 15, 1986	0–0 OT	@ Buffalo Sabres	1–2–1
5	W	October 18, 1986	5–3	Winnipeg Jets	2–2–1
6	L	October 20, 1986	4–5	Washington Capitals	2–3–1
7	W	October 22, 1986	4–3	@ Detroit Red Wings	3–3–1
8	T	October 25, 1986	3–3 OT	New York Rangers	3–3–2
9	W	October 27, 1986	6–5	Los Angeles Kings	4–3–2
10	W	October 29, 1986	5–2	Buffalo Sabres	5–3–2
11	T	October 30, 1986	3–3 OT	@ Boston Bruins	5–3–3

November

Game	Result	Date	Score	Opponent	Record
12	W	November 2, 1986	5–3	@ Vancouver Canucks	6–3–3
13	W	November 6, 1986	6–4	@ Los Angeles Kings	7–3–3
14	L	November 8, 1986	3–4	@ Edmonton Oilers	7–4–3
15	L	November 9, 1986	0–3	@ Calgary Flames	7–5–3
16	W	November 12, 1986	4–3	Quebec Nordiques	8–5–3
17	W	November 15, 1986	4–2	Buffalo Sabres	9–5–3
18	W	November 17, 1986	3–2 OT	Boston Bruins	10–5–3
19	W	November 19, 1986	4–1	@ Hartford Whalers	11–5–3
20	W	November 20, 1986	3–1	@ Boston Bruins	12–5–3
21	L	November 22, 1986	3–4	Detroit Red Wings	12–6–3
22	L	November 25, 1986	1–2	@ Quebec Nordiques	12–7–3
23	L	November 26, 1986	2–4	@ Philadelphia Flyers	12–8–3
24	L	November 29, 1986	5–7	Hartford Whalers	12–9–3

December

Game	Result	Date	Score	Opponent	Record
25	L	December 1, 1986	1–2 OT	Washington Capitals	12–10–3
26	W	December 3, 1986	4–3 OT	St. Louis Blues	13–10–3
27	T	December 5, 1986	3–3 OT	@ Detroit Red Wings	13–10–4
28	L	December 6, 1986	1–3	@ Washington Capitals	13–11–4
29	W	December 8, 1986	5–3	Calgary Flames	14–11–4
30	W	December 11, 1986	6–2	New York Rangers	15–11–4
31	L	December 13, 1986	2–4	Boston Bruins	15–12–4
32	L	December 14, 1986	2–4	@ New Jersey Devils	15–13–4
33	W	December 16, 1986	4–2	@ St. Louis Blues	16–13–4
34	L	December 19, 1986	2–3	@ Buffalo Sabres	16–14–4
35	W	December 20, 1986	5–2	New Jersey Devils	17–14–4
36	T	December 22, 1986	4–4 OT	Pittsburgh Penguins	17–14–5
37	T	December 26, 1986	1–1 OT	@ Hartford Whalers	17–14–6
38	W	December 27, 1986	6–2	Hartford Whalers	18–14–6
39	L	December 30, 1986	3–6	@ Quebec Nordiques	18–15–6
40	W	December 31, 1986	4–1	Quebec Nordiques	19–15–6

January

Game	Result	Date	Score	Opponent	Record
41	L	January 3, 1987	3–6	@ Pittsburgh Penguins	19–16–6
42	W	January 5, 1987	2–1	@ Boston Bruins	20–16–6
43	L	January 7, 1987	2–3 OT	Vancouver Canucks	20–17–6
44	W	January 10, 1987	5–2	Quebec Nordiques	21–17–6
45	W	January 12, 1987	2–1	Toronto Maple Leafs	22–17–6
46	T	January 14, 1987	3–3 OT	@ Buffalo Sabres	22–17–7
47	L	January 15, 1987	3–6	@ Philadelphia Flyers	22–18–7
48	W	January 17, 1987	4–2	Buffalo Sabres	23–18–7
49	L	January 19, 1987	4–5 OT	Hartford Whalers	23–19–7
50	L	January 21, 1987	1–3	@ Hartford Whalers	23–20–7
51	L	January 22, 1987	3–7	@ Boston Bruins	23–21–7
52	W	January 24, 1987	3–1	Chicago Blackhawks	24–21–7
53	W	January 26, 1987	3–2	@ Chicago Blackhawks	25–21–7
54	L	January 27, 1987	1–2	@ St. Louis Blues	25–22–7
55	W	January 31, 1987	5–3	Los Angeles Kings	26–22–7

February

Game	Result	Date	Score	Opponent	Record
56	L	February 3, 1987	1–4	@ Quebec Nordiques	26–23–7
57	W	February 4, 1987	4–3	Quebec Nordiques	27–23–7
58	L	February 7, 1987	1–3	@ Hartford Whalers	27–24–7
59	W	February 14, 1987	5–2	Winnipeg Jets	28–24–7
60	W	February 16, 1987	7–3	Boston Bruins	29–24–7
61	T	February 18, 1987	1–1 OT	New York Islanders	29–24–8
62	L	February 21, 1987	5–6	@ New York Islanders	29–25–8
63	L	February 23, 1987	3–4	Minnesota North Stars	29–26–8
64	T	February 25, 1987	3–3 OT	@ Chicago Blackhawks	29–26–9
65	W	February 28, 1987	3–2	New Jersey Devils	30–26–9

March

Game	Result	Date	Score	Opponent	Record
66	W	March 3, 1987	4–2	@ Calgary Flames	31–26–9
67	L	March 6, 1987	1–4	@ Vancouver Canucks	31–27–9
68	L	March 7, 1987	3–5	@ Edmonton Oilers	31–28–9
69	W	March 9, 1987	5–4	@ Minnesota North Stars	32–28–9
70	L	March 11, 1987	1–2	@ Winnipeg Jets	32–29–9
71	T	March 14, 1987	3–3 OT	Philadelphia Flyers	32–29–10
72	W	March 16, 1987	3–0	New York Islanders	33–29–10
73	W	March 20, 1987	3–2	@ Buffalo Sabres	34–29–10
74	W	March 21, 1987	9–4	Toronto Maple Leafs	35–29–10
75	W	March 24, 1987	4–3	@ Quebec Nordiques	36–29–10
76	W	March 28, 1987	6–3	Buffalo Sabres	37–29–10
77	W	March 29, 1987	4–1	@ Pittsburgh Penguins	38–29–10

April

Game	Result	Date	Score	Opponent	Record
78	W	April 1, 1987	3–2	Hartford Whalers	39–29–10
79	W	April 4, 1987	3–1	Boston Bruins	40–29–10
80	W	April 5, 1987	8–2	@ New York Rangers	41–29–10

Legend: Win (2 points) Loss (0 points) Tie (1 point)

== Player statistics ==
=== Regular season ===
==== Scoring ====
Player	Pos	GP	G	A	Pts	PIM	+/-	PPG	SHG	GWG
Mats Naslund	LW	79	25	55	80	16	-3	10	0	3
Bobby Smith	C	80	28	47	75	72	6	11	0	7
Claude Lemieux	RW	76	27	26	53	156	0	5	0	1
Larry Robinson	D	70	13	37	50	44	24	6	0	3
Ryan Walter	C/LW	76	23	23	46	34	-6	11	0	4
Guy Carbonneau	C	79	18	27	45	68	9	0	0	2
Gaston Gingras	D	66	11	34	45	21	-2	7	0	2
Chris Chelios	D	71	11	33	44	124	-5	6	0	2
Stephane Richer	RW	57	20	19	39	80	11	4	0	3
Mike McPhee	LW	79	18	21	39	58	7	0	2	2
Sergio Momesso	LW	59	14	17	31	96	0	3	0	4
Brian Skrudland	C	79	11	17	28	107	18	0	1	0
Shayne Corson	LW	55	12	11	23	144	10	0	1	3
Petr Svoboda	D	70	5	17	22	63	14	1	0	1
Kjell Dahlin	RW	41	12	8	20	0	-3	3	1	0
Chris Nilan	RW	44	4	16	20	266	2	0	0	1
David Maley	LW	48	6	12	18	55	-1	0	0	0
Bob Gainey	LW	47	8	8	16	19	0	0	1	3
Craig Ludwig	D	75	4	12	16	105	3	0	0	0
Rick Green	D	72	1	9	10	10	-1	0	0	0
Mike Lalor	D	57	0	10	10	47	5	0	0	0
John Kordic	RW	44	5	3	8	151	-7	0	0	0
Gilles Thibaudeau	C	9	1	3	4	0	5	0	0	0
Brian Hayward	G	37	0	2	2	2	0	0	0	0
Patrick Roy	G	46	0	1	1	8	0	0	0	0
Serge Boisvert	RW	1	0	0	0	0	0	0	0	0
Tom Kurvers	D	1	0	0	0	0	1	0	0	0
Steve Rooney	LW	2	0	0	0	22	0	0	0	0
Scott Sandelin	D	1	0	0	0	0	1	0	0	0

==== Goaltending ====
Player	MIN	GP	W	L	T	GA	GAA	SO	SA	SV	SV%
Patrick Roy	2686	46	22	16	6	131	2.93	1	1210	1079	.892
Brian Hayward	2178	37	19	13	4	102	2.81	1	959	857	.894
Team:	4864	80	41	29	10	233	2.87	2	2169	1936	.893

=== Playoffs ===
==== Scoring ====
Player	Pos	GP	G	A	Pts	PIM	PPG	SHG	GWG
Mats Naslund	LW	17	7	15	22	11	4	0	3
Larry Robinson	D	17	3	17	20	6	2	0	0
Ryan Walter	C/LW	17	7	12	19	10	2	1	1
Bobby Smith	C	17	9	9	18	19	2	0	0
Chris Chelios	D	17	4	9	13	38	2	1	0
Claude Lemieux	RW	17	4	9	13	41	2	0	0
Shayne Corson	LW	17	6	5	11	30	1	1	1
Guy Carbonneau	C	17	3	8	11	20	0	0	0
Mike McPhee	LW	17	7	2	9	13	1	0	2
Kjell Dahlin	RW	8	2	4	6	0	0	0	0
Brian Skrudland	C	14	1	5	6	29	0	0	0
Stephane Richer	RW	5	3	2	5	0	0	0	1
Craig Ludwig	D	17	2	3	5	30	0	0	1
Petr Svoboda	D	14	0	5	5	10	0	0	0
Bob Gainey	LW	17	1	3	4	6	0	0	0
Sergio Momesso	LW	11	1	3	4	31	0	0	0
Rick Green	D	17	0	4	4	8	0	0	0
Chris Nilan	RW	17	3	0	3	75	0	0	0
Mike Lalor	D	13	2	1	3	29	0	0	0
John Kordic	RW	11	2	0	2	19	0	0	1
Gaston Gingras	D	5	0	2	2	0	0	0	0
Brian Hayward	G	13	0	0	0	2	0	0	0
Patrick Roy	G	6	0	0	0	0	0	0	0

==== Goaltending ====
Player	MIN	GP	W	L	GA	GAA	SO	SA	SV	SV%
Brian Hayward	708	13	6	5	32	2.71	0	308	276	.896
Patrick Roy	330	6	4	2	22	4.00	0	173	151	.873
Team:	1038	17	10	7	54	3.12	0	481	427	.888

Note:

Pos = Position;GP = Games played; G = Goals; A = Assists; Pts = Points; PIM = Penalty minutes; +/- = Plus/minus; PPG = Power-play goals; SHG = Short-handed goals; GWG = Game-winning goals
Pos = Position;GP = Games played; Min, TOI = Minutes played; W = Wins; L = Losses; T,T/OT = Ties; OTL = Overtime losses; GA = Goals-against; GAA = Goals-against average; SO = Shutouts; SA = Shots against; SV = Shots saved;SV% = Save percentage;
