= 1986–87 Toronto Maple Leafs season =

NHL hockey team season

1986–87 Toronto Maple Leafs
- Division: 4th Norris
- Conference: 8th Campbell
- 1986–87 record: 32–46–6
- Home record: 22–14–4
- Road record: 10–28–2
- Goals for: 286
- Goals against: 319

Team information
- General manager: Gerry McNamara
- Coach: John Brophy
- Captain: Vacant
- Alternate captains: Wendel Clark; Borje Salming; Unknown
- Arena: Maple Leaf Gardens

Team leaders
- Goals: Wendel Clark 37
- Assists: Russ Courtnall 44
- Points: Russ Courtnall 73
- Penalty minutes: Wendel Clark (271)
- Wins: Ken Wregget (22)
- Goals against average: Allan Bester (3.68)

The 1986–87 Toronto Maple Leafs season was the team's 70th season competing in the National Hockey League (NHL). The team would qualify for the playoffs for the second consecutive year, before losing in the division finals.

== Off-season ==
=== NHL draft ===
Round	#	Player	Nationality	College/Junior/Club team
1	6	Vincent Damphousse (C)	Canada	Laval Voisins (QMJHL)
2	36	Darryl Shannon (D)	Canada	Windsor Compuware Spitfires (OHL)
3	48	Sean Boland (D)	Canada	Toronto Marlboros (OHL)
4	69	Kent Hulst (C)	Canada	Windsor Compuware Spitfires (OHL)
5	90	Scott Taylor (D)	Canada	Kitchener Rangers (OHL)
6	111	Stephane Giguere (LW)	Canada	Saint-Jean Castors (QMJHL)
7	132	Dan Hie (C)	Canada	Ottawa 67's (OHL)
8	153	Steve Brennan (F)	United States	New Preparatory School (USHS-MA)
9	174	Brian Bellefeuille (RW)	United States	Canterbury School (USHS-CT)
10	195	Sean Davidson (RW)	Canada	Toronto Marlboros (OHL)
11	216	Mark Holick (RW)	Canada	Saskatoon Blades (WHL)
12	237	Brian Hoard (D)	Canada	Hamilton Steelhawks (OHL)
S2	9	Art Fitzgerald	United States	Trinity College (NESCAC)

== Regular season ==
Francis "King" Clancy, former defenceman with Ottawa and Toronto, had to undergo surgery to remove his gall bladder. Unfortunately, infection from the gall bladder seeped into his body during surgery, causing him to go into septic shock. He died November 10, 1986.

=== Final standings ===
Norris Division
	GP	W	L	T	GF	GA	Pts
**St. Louis Blues**	80	32	33	15	281	293	79
**Detroit Red Wings**	80	34	36	10	260	274	78
**Chicago Blackhawks**	80	29	37	14	290	310	72
**Toronto Maple Leafs**	80	32	42	6	286	319	70
Minnesota North Stars	80	30	40	10	296	314	70

Note: GP = Games played, W = Wins, L = Losses, T = Ties, Pts = Points, GF = Goals for, GA = Goals against
Note: Teams that qualified for the playoffs are highlighted in bold.

=== Record vs. opponents ===
Norris Division record vs. opponents

==== Vs. Campbell Conference ====
**Vs. Norris Division**

1986–87 NHL records
Team	**CHI**	**DET**	**MIN**	**STL**	**TOR**	**Total**
Chicago	—	3–4–1	2–4–2	1–3–4	4–4	**10–15–7**
Detroit	4–3–1	—	7–0–1	3–4–1	2–5–1	**16–12–4**
Minnesota	4–2–2	0–7–1	—	2–5–1	6–2	**12–16–4**
St. Louis	3–1–4	4–3–1	5–2–1	—	5–2–1	**17–8–7**
Toronto	4–4	5–2–1	2–6	2–5–1	—	**13–17–2**

**Vs. Smythe Division**

1986–87 NHL records
Team	**CGY**	**EDM**	**LAK**	**VAN**	**WIN**	**Total**
Chicago	0–3	2–1	1–1–1	1–1–1	3–0	**7–6–2**
Detroit	2–1	0–3	0–3	2–1	1–1–1	**5–9–1**
Minnesota	1–1–1	0–2–1	2–0–1	3–0	1–2	**7–5–3**
St. Louis	2–1	0–3	1–1–1	0–2–1	0–1–2	**3–8–4**
Toronto	1–2	1–2	1–1–1	1–2	2–1	**6–8–1**

**Vs. Wales Conference**

**Vs. Adams Division**

1986–87 NHL records
Team	**BOS**	**BUF**	**HFD**	**MTL**	**QUE**	**Total**
Chicago	1–1–1	1–2	2–1	0–2–1	1–2	**5–8–2**
Detroit	2–0–1	0–2–1	1–1–1	1–1–1	2–1	**6–5–4**
Minnesota	0–3	3–0	2–1	1–2	0–2–1	**6–8–1**
St. Louis	1–2	2–1	1–2	1–2	3–0	**8–7–0**
Toronto	1–2	2–0–1	1–2	1–2	0–3	**5–9–1**

**Vs. Patrick Division**

1986–87 NHL records
Team	**NJD**	**NYI**	**NYR**	**PHI**	**PIT**	**WSH**	**Total**
Chicago	2–1	2–1	1–1–1	0–2–1	1–2	1–1–1	**7–8–3**
Detroit	1–2	1–2	2–1	1–2	2–1	0–2–1	**7–10–1**
Minnesota	2–1	0–3	1–1–1	2–1	0–3	0–2–1	**5–11–2**
St. Louis	1–2	1–1–1	2–1	0–3	0–1–2	0–2–1	**4–10–4**
Toronto	2–1	1–2	1–1–1	1–1–1	2–1	1–2	**8–8–2**

== Schedule and results ==
1986–87 regular season
October

Game	Result	Date	Score	Opponent	Record
1	W	October 9, 1986	7–4	Montreal Canadiens (1986–87)	1–0–0
2	T	October 11, 1986	5–5 OT	Buffalo Sabres (1986–87)	1–0–1
3	T	October 14, 1986	1–1 OT	St. Louis Blues (1986–87)	1–0–2
4	W	October 17, 1986	3–2	@ New Jersey Devils (1986–87)	2–0–2
5	W	October 18, 1986	3–2	Chicago Blackhawks (1986–87)	3–0–2
6	L	October 22, 1986	1–7	Quebec Nordiques (1986–87)	3–1–2
7	L	October 25, 1986	3–4	@ Quebec Nordiques (1986–87)	3–2–2
8	T	October 26, 1986	3–3 OT	@ New York Rangers (1986–87)	3–2–3
9	W	October 28, 1986	2–1	Chicago Blackhawks (1986–87)	4–2–3
10	W	October 30, 1986	6–2	Hartford Whalers (1986–87)	5–2–3

November

Game	Result	Date	Score	Opponent	Record
11	W	November 1, 1986	2–0	Detroit Red Wings (1986–87)	6–2–3
12	W	November 5, 1986	6–4	St. Louis Blues (1986–87)	7–2–3
13	L	November 6, 1986	1–4	@ Minnesota North Stars (1986–87)	7–3–3
14	L	November 8, 1986	3–5	Vancouver Canucks (1986–87)	7–4–3
15	L	November 12, 1986	2–4	@ St. Louis Blues (1986–87)	7–5–3
16	W	November 15, 1986	6–0	Detroit Red Wings (1986–87)	8–5–3
17	W	November 16, 1986	7–3	@ Chicago Blackhawks (1986–87)	9–5–3
18	T	November 19, 1986	2–2 OT	Philadelphia Flyers (1986–87)	9–5–4
19	L	November 20, 1986	4–6	@ New York Islanders (1986–87)	9–6–4
20	L	November 22, 1986	1–6	@ Philadelphia Flyers (1986–87)	9–7–4
21	L	November 24, 1986	2–3	Boston Bruins (1986–87)	9–8–4
22	W	November 26, 1986	3–1	@ Detroit Red Wings (1986–87)	10–8–4
23	L	November 28, 1986	3–6	@ Minnesota North Stars (1986–87)	10–9–4
24	L	November 29, 1986	2–7	Minnesota North Stars (1986–87)	10–10–4

December

Game	Result	Date	Score	Opponent	Record
25	L	December 4, 1986	3–4	@ Los Angeles Kings (1986–87)	10–11–4
26	L	December 7, 1986	3–5	@ St. Louis Blues (1986–87)	10–12–4
27	W	December 10, 1986	8–2	Washington Capitals (1986–87)	11–12–4
28	L	December 12, 1986	3–8	@ Pittsburgh Penguins (1986–87)	11–13–4
29	W	December 13, 1986	3–2 OT	Pittsburgh Penguins (1986–87)	12–13–4
30	L	December 17, 1986	2–3 OT	@ New Jersey Devils (1986–87)	12–14–4
31	L	December 18, 1986	5–6 OT	Minnesota North Stars (1986–87)	12–15–4
32	W	December 20, 1986	5–4 OT	Buffalo Sabres (1986–87)	13–15–4
33	W	December 23, 1986	4–3 OT	@ Minnesota North Stars (1986–87)	14–15–4
34	L	December 26, 1986	2–4	@ Detroit Red Wings (1986–87)	14–16–4
35	T	December 27, 1986	5–5 OT	Detroit Red Wings (1986–87)	14–16–5
36	W	December 31, 1986	6–1	Winnipeg Jets (1986–87)	15–16–5

January

Game	Result	Date	Score	Opponent	Record
37	W	January 3, 1987	7–2	New Jersey Devils (1986–87)	16–16–5
38	L	January 4, 1987	3–8	@ Hartford Whalers (1986–87)	16–17–5
39	W	January 6, 1987	3–1	@ Detroit Red Wings (1986–87)	17–17–5
40	L	January 7, 1987	4–6	@ Chicago Blackhawks (1986–87)	17–18–5
41	L	January 10, 1987	2–3	@ New York Islanders (1986–87)	17–19–5
42	L	January 12, 1987	1–2	@ Montreal Canadiens (1986–87)	17–20–5
43	L	January 14, 1987	2–3	Minnesota North Stars (1986–87)	17–21–5
44	W	January 15, 1987	3–1	@ Detroit Red Wings (1986–87)	18–21–5
45	L	January 17, 1987	4–7	Edmonton Oilers (1986–87)	18–22–5
46	W	January 21, 1987	4–2	St. Louis Blues (1986–87)	19–22–5
47	L	January 23, 1987	5–7	@ Winnipeg Jets (1986–87)	19–23–5
48	L	January 24, 1987	0–3	Hartford Whalers (1986–87)	19–24–5
49	L	January 26, 1987	5–6 OT	Calgary Flames (1986–87)	19–25–5
50	L	January 28, 1987	0–5	@ Chicago Blackhawks (1986–87)	19–26–5
51	L	January 29, 1987	2–4	@ St. Louis Blues (1986–87)	19–27–5
52	L	January 31, 1987	2–4	Detroit Red Wings (1986–87)	19–28–5

February

Game	Result	Date	Score	Opponent	Record
53	W	February 2, 1987	8–4	Philadelphia Flyers (1986–87)	20–28–5
54	W	February 4, 1987	5–4	Los Angeles Kings (1986–87)	21–28–5
55	L	February 7, 1987	5–8	@ Boston Bruins (1986–87)	21–29–5
56	W	February 8, 1987	5–4	@ New York Rangers (1986–87)	22–29–5
57	W	February 14, 1987	5–4	Boston Bruins (1986–87)	23–29–5
58	T	February 16, 1987	1–1 OT	@ Los Angeles Kings (1986–87)	23–29–6
59	L	February 18, 1987	2–9	@ Edmonton Oilers (1986–87)	23–30–6
60	L	February 20, 1987	2–7	@ Calgary Flames (1986–87)	23–31–6
61	L	February 22, 1987	2–3	@ Vancouver Canucks (1986–87)	23–32–6
62	L	February 25, 1987	2–4	New York Rangers (1986–87)	23–33–6
63	W	February 28, 1987	8–6	Vancouver Canucks (1986–87)	24–33–6

March

Game	Result	Date	Score	Opponent	Record
64	L	March 3, 1987	3–4	St. Louis Blues (1986–87)	24–34–6
65	W	March 5, 1987	7–2	Pittsburgh Penguins (1986–87)	25–34–6
66	W	March 7, 1987	7–2	New York Islanders (1986–87)	26–34–6
67	L	March 9, 1987	2–3 OT	@ St. Louis Blues (1986–87)	26–35–6
68	W	March 11, 1987	4–2	@ Minnesota North Stars (1986–87)	27–35–6
69	L	March 13, 1987	2–10	@ Washington Capitals (1986–87)	27–36–6
70	W	March 14, 1987	6–4	Calgary Flames (1986–87)	28–36–6
71	L	March 18, 1987	3–6	Chicago Blackhawks (1986–87)	28–37–6
72	L	March 20, 1987	4–5	@ Quebec Nordiques (1986–87)	28–38–6
73	L	March 21, 1987	4–9	@ Montreal Canadiens (1986–87)	28–39–6
74	W	March 24, 1987	6–5	@ Buffalo Sabres (1986–87)	29–39–6
75	L	March 25, 1987	2–6	Minnesota North Stars (1986–87)	29–40–6
76	W	March 28, 1987	4–2	Edmonton Oilers (1986–87)	30–40–6
77	W	March 29, 1987	6–2	@ Winnipeg Jets (1986–87)	31–40–6
78	L	March 31, 1987	2–4	@ Washington Capitals (1986–87)	31–41–6

April

Game	Result	Date	Score	Opponent	Record
79	W	April 4, 1987	3–1	Chicago Blackhawks (1986–87)	32–41–6
80	L	April 5, 1987	2–5	@ Chicago Blackhawks (1986–87)	32–42–6

Legend: Win (2 points) Loss (0 points) Tie (1 point)

== Playoffs ==
=== Norris Division semi-finals ===
Toronto Maple Leafs vs. St. Louis Blues

Date	Away	Score	Home	Score	Notes
April 8	Toronto	1	St. Louis	3	
April 9	Toronto	3	St. Louis	2	(OT)
April 11	St. Louis	5	Toronto	3	
April 12	St. Louis	1	Toronto	2	
April 14	Toronto	2	St. Louis	1	
April 16	St. Louis	0	Toronto	4	

Toronto Maple Leafs win best-of-seven series 4-2

=== Norris Division finals ===
Detroit Red Wings vs. Toronto Maple Leafs

Date	Away	Score	Home	Score	Notes
April 21	Toronto	4	Detroit	2	
April 23	Toronto	7	Detroit	2	
April 25	Detroit	4	Toronto	2	
April 27	Detroit	2	Toronto	3	(OT)
April 29	Toronto	0	Detroit	3	
May 1	Detroit	4	Toronto	2	
May 3	Toronto	0	Detroit	3	

Detroit Red Wings win series 4-3

== Player statistics ==
=== Regular season ===
Scoring

Player	Pos	GP	G	A	Pts	PIM	+/-	PPG	SHG	GWG
Russ Courtnall	RW	79	29	44	73	90	-20	3	6	3
Rick Vaive	RW	73	32	34	66	61	12	8	1	6
Steve Thomas	LW	78	35	27	62	114	-3	3	0	7
Wendel Clark	LW/D	80	37	23	60	271	-23	15	0	1
Gary Leeman	RW	80	21	31	52	66	-26	4	3	2
Tom Fergus	C	57	21	28	49	57	1	2	1	2
Vincent Damphousse	C	80	21	25	46	26	-6	4	0	1
Peter Ihnacak	C	58	12	27	39	16	5	4	0	1
Todd Gill	D	61	4	27	31	92	-3	1	0	0
Al Iafrate	D	80	9	21	30	55	-18	0	0	3
Mike Allison	LW	71	7	16	23	66	1	1	3	2
Rick Lanz	D	44	2	19	21	32	4	1	0	0
Borje Salming	D	56	4	16	20	42	17	0	1	1
Jeff Jackson	LW	55	8	7	15	64	-11	0	0	0
Miroslav Frycer	RW	29	7	8	15	28	-15	3	0	0
Greg Terrion	LW	67	7	8	15	6	-5	0	2	0
Mark Osborne	LW	16	5	10	15	12	-1	1	0	0
Brad Smith	RW	47	5	7	12	172	15	0	0	2
Chris Kotsopoulos	D	43	2	10	12	75	8	0	0	0
Miroslav Ihnacak	LW	34	6	5	11	12	3	0	0	0
Ken Yaremchuk	C	20	3	8	11	16	0	0	0	0
Dan Daoust	C	33	4	3	7	35	0	0	0	1
Bill Root	D	34	3	3	6	37	-9	1	0	0
Bob McGill	D	56	1	4	5	103	-2	0	0	0
Ken Wregget	G	56	0	4	4	20	0	0	0	0
Daryl Evans	LW	2	1	0	1	0	-2	1	0	0
Ted Fauss	D	15	0	1	1	11	4	0	0	0
Terry Johnson	D	48	0	1	1	104	-5	0	0	0
Jim Benning	D	5	0	0	0	4	0	0	0	0
Tim Bernhardt	G	1	0	0	0	0	0	0	0	0
Allan Bester	G	36	0	0	0	8	0	0	0	0
Jerry Dupont	D	13	0	0	0	23	-5	0	0	0
Val James	LW	4	0	0	0	14	0	0	0	0
Derek Laxdal	RW	2	0	0	0	7	-1	0	0	0
Kevin Maguire	RW	17	0	0	0	74	-6	0	0	0

Goaltending

Player	MIN	GP	W	L	T	GA	GAA	SO	SA	SV	SV%
Ken Wregget	3026	56	22	28	3	200	3.97	0	1598	1398	.875
Allan Bester	1808	36	10	14	3	110	3.65	2	991	881	.889
Tim Bernhardt	20	1	0	0	0	3	9.00	0	7	4	.571
Team:	4854	80	32	42	6	313	3.87	2	2596	2283	.879

=== Playoffs ===
Scoring

Player	Pos	GP	G	A	Pts	PIM	PPG	SHG	GWG
Wendel Clark	LW/D	13	6	5	11	38	3	0	1
Mike Allison	LW	13	3	5	8	15	1	0	2
Dan Daoust	C	13	5	2	7	42	0	0	2
Russ Courtnall	RW	13	3	4	7	11	1	0	0
Rick Vaive	RW	13	4	2	6	23	1	0	0
Peter Ihnacak	C	13	2	4	6	9	0	0	0
Vincent Damphousse	C	12	1	5	6	8	1	0	0
Steve Thomas	LW	13	2	3	5	13	0	0	0
Todd Gill	D	13	2	2	4	42	0	0	0
Al Iafrate	D	13	1	3	4	11	1	0	0
Rick Lanz	D	13	1	3	4	27	0	0	1
Mark Osborne	LW	9	1	3	4	6	0	0	0
Borje Salming	D	13	0	3	3	14	0	0	0
Brad Smith	RW	11	1	1	2	24	0	0	1
Greg Terrion	LW	13	0	2	2	14	0	0	0
Bill Root	D	13	1	0	1	12	0	0	0
Tom Fergus	C	2	0	1	1	2	0	0	0
Gary Leeman	RW	5	0	1	1	14	0	0	0
Ken Wregget	G	13	0	1	1	4	0	0	0
Allan Bester	G	1	0	0	0	0	0	0	0
Daryl Evans	LW	1	0	0	0	0	0	0	0
Miroslav Ihnacak	LW	1	0	0	0	0	0	0	0
Wes Jarvis	C	2	0	0	0	2	0	0	0
Terry Johnson	D	2	0	0	0	0	0	0	0
Chris Kotsopoulos	D	7	0	0	0	14	0	0	0
Kevin Maguire	RW	1	0	0	0	0	0	0	0
Bob McGill	D	3	0	0	0	0	0	0	0
Ken Yaremchuk	C	6	0	0	0	0	0	0	0

Goaltending

Player	MIN	GP	W	L	GA	GAA	SO	SA	SV	SV%
Ken Wregget	761	13	7	6	29	2.29	1	368	339	.921
Allan Bester	39	1	0	0	1	1.54	0	17	16	.941
Team:	800	13	7	6	30	2.25	1	385	355	.922

Note:

Pos = Position;GP = Games played; G = Goals; A = Assists; Pts = Points; PIM = Penalty minutes; +/- = Plus/minus; PPG = Power-play goals; SHG = Short-handed goals; GWG = Game-winning goals
Pos = Position;GP = Games played; Min, TOI = Minutes played; W = Wins; L = Losses; T,T/OT = Ties; OTL = Overtime losses; GA = Goals-against; GAA = Goals-against average; SO = Shutouts; SA = Shots against; SV = Shots saved;SV% = Save percentage;

== Awards and records ==
- Rick Vaive, Molson Cup (Most game star selections for Toronto Maple Leafs)

== Transactions ==
The Maple Leafs have been involved in the following transactions during the 1986–87 season.

=== Trades ===
August 18, 1986	To New York Rangers Walt Poddubny	To Toronto Maple Leafs Mike Allison
September 6, 1986	To Chicago Blackhawks FA signing of Gary Nylund	To Toronto Maple Leafs Jerry Dupont; Ken Yaremchuk; 4th round pick in 1987 – Joe Sacco
October 2, 1986	To Vancouver Canucks Brad Maxwell	To Toronto Maple Leafs 5th round pick in 1988 – Len Esau
October 3, 1986	To Calgary Flames Jim Korn	To Toronto Maple Leafs Terry Johnson
December 2, 1986	To Vancouver Canucks Jim Benning; Dan Hodgson	To Toronto Maple Leafs Rick Lanz
February 4, 1987	To Philadelphia Flyers 5th round pick in 1989 – Pat MacLeod	To Toronto Maple Leafs Mike Stothers
March 5, 1987	To New York Rangers Jeff Jackson; 3rd round pick in 1989 – Rob Zamuner	To Toronto Maple Leafs Mark Osborne

=== Free agents ===
Player	Former team
Ted Fauss	Montreal Canadiens
Daryl Evans	Washington Capitals
Marty Dallman	Los Angeles Kings

Player	New team
Gary Nylund	Chicago Blackhawks

== See also ==
- 1986–87 NHL season
