= 1986–87 Pittsburgh Penguins season =

NHL team season

1986–87 Pittsburgh Penguins
- Division: 5th Patrick
- Conference: 9th Wales
- 1986–87 record: 30–38–12
- Home record: 19–15–6
- Road record: 11–23–6
- Goals for: 297
- Goals against: 290

Team information
- General manager: Eddie Johnston
- Coach: Bob Berry
- Captain: Mike Bullard (Oct-Nov); Terry Ruskowski (Nov-Apr)
- Alternate captains: Mario Lemieux (Nov-Apr); Moe Mantha; Terry Ruskowski (Oct-Nov)
- Arena: Pittsburgh Civic Arena

Team leaders
- Goals: Mario Lemieux (54)
- Assists: Mario Lemieux (53)
- Points: Mario Lemieux (107)
- Penalty minutes: Dan Frawley (218)
- Wins: Gilles Meloche (13)
- Goals against average: Pat Riggin (3.34)

The 1986–87 Pittsburgh Penguins season was the Penguins' 20th season in the National Hockey League (NHL). The Penguins did not qualify for the playoffs for the fifth year in a row for the first time in franchise history.

== Regular season ==
Despite a strong start at the beginning of the season, the Penguins managed to find themselves unqualified for the playoffs for the fifth straight year.

=== Final standings ===
Patrick Division
	GP	W	L	T	GF	GA	Pts
**Philadelphia Flyers**	80	46	26	8	310	245	100
**Washington Capitals**	80	38	32	10	285	278	86
**New York Islanders**	80	35	33	12	279	281	82
**New York Rangers**	80	34	38	8	307	323	76
Pittsburgh Penguins	80	30	38	12	297	290	72
New Jersey Devils	80	29	45	6	293	368	64

Note: GP = Games played, W = Wins, L = Losses, T = Ties, Pts = Points, GF = Goals for, GA = Goals against
Note: Teams that qualified for the playoffs are highlighted in bold.

=== Record vs. opponents ===
Patrick Division record vs. opponents

==== Vs. Wales Conference ====
**Vs. Patrick Division**

1986–87 NHL records
Team	**NJD**	**NYI**	**NYR**	**PHI**	**PIT**	**WSH**	**Total**
New Jersey	—	2–5	4–3	2–4–1	4–3	1–6	13–21–1
N.Y. Islanders	5–2	—	3–3–1	3–4	5–0–2	2–3–2	18–12–2
N.Y. Rangers	3–4	3–3–1	—	4–3	3–2–2	4–3	17–15–3
Philadelphia	4–2–1	4–3	3–4	—	4–1–2	5–1–1	20–11–4
Pittsburgh	3–4	0–5–2	2–3–2	1–4–2	—	4–3	10–19–6
Washington	6–1	3–2–2	3–4	1–5–1	3–4	—	16–16–3

**Vs. Adams Division**

1986–87 NHL records
Team	**BOS**	**BUF**	**HFD**	**MTL**	**QUE**	**Total**
New Jersey	1–1–1	1–2	1–1–1	1–2	0–1–2	4–7–4
N.Y. Islanders	0–2–1	1–1–1	1–2	1–1–1	2–1	5–7–3
N.Y. Rangers	2–1	2–1	0–3	0–2–1	2–1	6–8–1
Philadelphia	2–1	2–1	1–2	2–0–1	2–0–1	9–4–2
Pittsburgh	1–2	2–0–1	0–3	1–1–1	3–0	7–6–2
Washington	1–1–1	1–2	1–2	3–0	0–2–1	6–7–2

==== Vs. Campbell Conference ====
**Vs. Norris Division**

1986–87 NHL records
Team	**CHI**	**DET**	**MIN**	**STL**	**TOR**	**Total**
New Jersey	1–2	2–1	1–2	2–1	1–2	7–8–0
N.Y. Islanders	1–2	2–1	3–0	1–1–1	2–1	9–5–1
N.Y. Rangers	1–1–1	1–2	1–1–1	1–2	1–1–1	5–7–3
Philadelphia	2–0–1	2–1	1–2	3–0	1–1–1	9–4–2
Pittsburgh	2–1	1–2	3–0	1–0–2	1–2	8–5–2
Washington	1–1–1	2–0–1	2–0–1	2–0–1	2–1	9–2–4

**Vs. Smythe Division**

1986–87 NHL records
Team	**CGY**	**EDM**	**LAK**	**VAN**	**WIN**	**Total**
New Jersey	1–2	1–2	1–2	2–0–1	0–3	5–9–1
N.Y. Islanders	0–2–1	0–2–1	1–2	1–2	1–1–1	3–9–2
N.Y. Rangers	1–2	0–3	2–0–1	2–1	1–2	6–8–1
Philadelphia	1–2	2–1	1–2	2–1	2–1	8–7–0
Pittsburgh	1–2	1–2	1–2	1–0–2	1–2	5–8–2
Washington	1–2	2–1	0–3	3–0	1–1–1	7–7–1

== Schedule and results ==
1986–87 regular season
October: 8–3–0 (home: 6–1–0; road: 2–2–0), 16 points

#	Date	Visitor	Score	Home	Location	Record	Points
1	Oct 9	Washington Capitals	4–5	Pittsburgh Penguins	Civic Arena	1–0–0	2
2	Oct 11	New York Rangers	5–6 OT	Pittsburgh Penguins	Civic Arena	2–0–0	4
3	Oct 12	Pittsburgh Penguins	4–1	Chicago Blackhawks	Chicago Stadium	3–0–0	6
4	Oct 14	Los Angeles Kings	3–4 OT	Pittsburgh Penguins	Civic Arena	4–0–0	8
5	Oct 17	Pittsburgh Penguins	7–3	Buffalo Sabres	Buffalo Memorial Auditorium	5–0–0	10
6	Oct 18	New Jersey Devils	4–8	Pittsburgh Penguins	Civic Arena	6–0–0	12
7	Oct 22	Buffalo Sabres	4–5 OT	Pittsburgh Penguins	Civic Arena	7–0–0	14
8	Oct 23	Pittsburgh Penguins	3–5	Philadelphia Flyers	The Spectrum	7–1–0	14
9	Oct 25	Philadelphia Flyers	2–4	Pittsburgh Penguins	Civic Arena	8–1–0	16
10	Oct 28	Pittsburgh Penguins	2–5	Hartford Whalers	XL Center	8–2–0	16
11	Oct 29	New Jersey Devils	8–6	Pittsburgh Penguins	Civic Arena	8–3–0	16

November: 5–5–4 (home: 2–1–0; road: 3–4–2), 14 points

#	Date	Visitor	Score	Home	Location	Record	Points
12	Nov 1	Pittsburgh Penguins	3–3 OT	St. Louis Blues	The Checkerdome	8–3–1	17
13	Nov 4	Vancouver Canucks	2–2 OT	Pittsburgh Penguins	Civic Arena	8–3–2	18
14	Nov 8	Pittsburgh Penguins	4–2	Minnesota North Stars	Met Center	9–3–2	20
15	Nov 9	Pittsburgh Penguins	1–2	Detroit Red Wings	Joe Louis Arena	9–4–2	20
16	Nov 12	Boston Bruins	1–2	Pittsburgh Penguins	Civic Arena	10–4–2	22
17	Nov 14	Pittsburgh Penguins	4–5	New Jersey Devils	Izod Center	10–5–2	22
18	Nov 15	Quebec Nordiques	2–5	Pittsburgh Penguins	Civic Arena	11–5–2	24
19	Nov 18	Pittsburgh Penguins	1–3	Winnipeg Jets	Winnipeg Arena	11–6–2	24
20	Nov 20	Pittsburgh Penguins	5–2	Calgary Flames	Scotiabank Saddledome	12–6–2	26
21	Nov 22	Pittsburgh Penguins	5–4	Washington Capitals	Capital Centre	13–6–2	28
22	Nov 25	Pittsburgh Penguins	1–5	New York Islanders	Nassau Veterans Memorial Coliseum	13–7–2	28
23	Nov 26	New York Islanders	3–2	Pittsburgh Penguins	Civic Arena	13–8–2	28
24	Nov 29	New York Rangers	5–5 OT	Pittsburgh Penguins	Civic Arena	13–8–3	29
25	Nov 30	Pittsburgh Penguins	2–2 OT	New York Rangers	Madison Square Garden (IV)	13–8–4	30

December: 2–7–3 (home: 2–4–1; road: 0–3–2), 7 points

#	Date	Visitor	Score	Home	Location	Record	Points
26	Dec 5	Edmonton Oilers	4–2	Pittsburgh Penguins	Civic Arena	13–9–4	30
27	Dec 6	Minnesota North Stars	2–5	Pittsburgh Penguins	Civic Arena	14–9–4	32
28	Dec 10	Calgary Flames	6–4	Pittsburgh Penguins	Civic Arena	14–10–4	32
29	Dec 12	Toronto Maple Leafs	3–8	Pittsburgh Penguins	Civic Arena	15–10–4	34
30	Dec 13	Pittsburgh Penguins	2–3 OT	Toronto Maple Leafs	Maple Leaf Gardens	15–11–4	34
31	Dec 17	Pittsburgh Penguins	0–3	Los Angeles Kings	The Forum	15–12–4	34
32	Dec 20	Philadelphia Flyers	6–4	Pittsburgh Penguins	Civic Arena	15–13–4	34
33	Dec 22	Pittsburgh Penguins	4–4 OT	Montreal Canadiens	Montreal Forum	15–13–5	35
34	Dec 23	Pittsburgh Penguins	3–4 OT	New York Islanders	Nassau Veterans Memorial Coliseum	15–14–5	35
35	Dec 26	Pittsburgh Penguins	3–3 OT	Buffalo Sabres	Buffalo Memorial Auditorium	15–14–6	36
36	Dec 27	New York Islanders	3–3 OT	Pittsburgh Penguins	Civic Arena	15–14–7	37
37	Dec 30	New York Rangers	5–3	Pittsburgh Penguins	Civic Arena	15–15–7	37

January: 4–8–1 (home: 3–2–0; road: 1–6–1), 9 points

#	Date	Visitor	Score	Home	Location	Record	Points
38	Jan 1	Pittsburgh Penguins	3–4 OT	Washington Capitals	Capital Centre	15–16–7	37
39	Jan 3	Montreal Canadiens	3–6	Pittsburgh Penguins	Civic Arena	16–16–7	39
40	Jan 7	Washington Capitals	2–5	Pittsburgh Penguins	Civic Arena	17–16–7	41
41	Jan 9	Pittsburgh Penguins	2–3	Washington Capitals	Capital Centre	17–17–7	41
42	Jan 13	Pittsburgh Penguins	3–3 OT	New York Islanders	Nassau Veterans Memorial Coliseum	17–17–8	42
43	Jan 14	Winnipeg Jets	4–3	Pittsburgh Penguins	Civic Arena	17–18–8	42
44	Jan 17	Pittsburgh Penguins	2–4	Boston Bruins	Boston Garden	17–19–8	42
45	Jan 18	Detroit Red Wings	1–0	Pittsburgh Penguins	Civic Arena	17–20–8	42
46	Jan 21	Pittsburgh Penguins	5–10	Los Angeles Kings	The Forum	17–21–8	42
47	Jan 23	Pittsburgh Penguins	6–0	Vancouver Canucks	Pacific Coliseum	18–21–8	44
48	Jan 24	Pittsburgh Penguins	2–4	Edmonton Oilers	Northlands Coliseum	18–22–8	44
49	Jan 27	Washington Capitals	5–7	Pittsburgh Penguins	Civic Arena	19–22–8	46
50	Jan 29	Pittsburgh Penguins	3–5	Philadelphia Flyers	The Spectrum	19–23–8	46

February: 4–7–2 (home: 2–4–1; road: 2–3–1), 10 points

#	Date	Visitor	Score	Home	Location	Record	Points
51	Feb 1	Hartford Whalers	8–6	Pittsburgh Penguins	Civic Arena	19–24–8	46
52	Feb 5	Pittsburgh Penguins	5–6	Boston Bruins	Boston Garden	19–25–8	46
53	Feb 7	Chicago Blackhawks	1–4	Pittsburgh Penguins	Civic Arena	20–25–8	48
54	Feb 8	Pittsburgh Penguins	2–1 OT	New Jersey Devils	Izod Center	21–25–8	50
55	Feb 14	Vancouver Canucks	3–3 OT	Pittsburgh Penguins	Civic Arena	21–25–9	51
56	Feb 15	Pittsburgh Penguins	1–4	New York Rangers	Madison Square Garden (IV)	21–26–9	51
57	Feb 17	Calgary Flames	3–1	Pittsburgh Penguins	Civic Arena	21–27–9	51
58	Feb 19	Pittsburgh Penguins	4–4 OT	Philadelphia Flyers	The Spectrum	21–27–10	52
59	Feb 21	New Jersey Devils	6–5	Pittsburgh Penguins	Civic Arena	21–28–10	52
60	Feb 22	Pittsburgh Penguins	4–2	New York Rangers	Madison Square Garden (IV)	22–28–10	54
61	Feb 24	Edmonton Oilers	2–5	Pittsburgh Penguins	Civic Arena	23–28–10	56
62	Feb 26	Pittsburgh Penguins	4–5	New York Islanders	Nassau Veterans Memorial Coliseum	23–29–10	56
63	Feb 28	Chicago Blackhawks	2–1	Pittsburgh Penguins	Civic Arena	23–30–10	56

March: 5–8–2 (home: 2–3–2; road: 3–5–0), 12 points

#	Date	Visitor	Score	Home	Location	Record	Points
64	Mar 1	St. Louis Blues	5–5 OT	Pittsburgh Penguins	Civic Arena	23–30–11	57
65	Mar 3	Pittsburgh Penguins	8–1	Quebec Nordiques	Quebec Coliseum	24–30–11	59
66	Mar 5	Pittsburgh Penguins	2–7	Toronto Maple Leafs	Maple Leaf Gardens	24–31–11	59
67	Mar 7	Pittsburgh Penguins	7–3	Minnesota North Stars	Met Center	25–31–11	61
68	Mar 8	Pittsburgh Penguins	5–3	Winnipeg Jets	Winnipeg Arena	26–31–11	63
69	Mar 10	New York Islanders	6–3	Pittsburgh Penguins	Civic Arena	26–32–11	63
70	Mar 12	Quebec Nordiques	3–6	Pittsburgh Penguins	Civic Arena	27–32–11	65
71	Mar 14	New York Rangers	3–2 OT	Pittsburgh Penguins	Civic Arena	27–33–11	65
72	Mar 18	St. Louis Blues	4–5	Pittsburgh Penguins	Civic Arena	28–33–11	67
73	Mar 20	Pittsburgh Penguins	3–4	Washington Capitals	Capital Centre	28–34–11	67
74	Mar 22	Pittsburgh Penguins	1–3	Philadelphia Flyers	The Spectrum	28–35–11	67
75	Mar 24	Philadelphia Flyers	3–3 OT	Pittsburgh Penguins	Civic Arena	28–35–12	68
76	Mar 28	Pittsburgh Penguins	4–5	Hartford Whalers	XL Center	28–36–12	68
77	Mar 29	Montreal Canadiens	4–1	Pittsburgh Penguins	Civic Arena	28–37–12	68
78	Mar 31	Pittsburgh Penguins	3–5	New Jersey Devils	Izod Center	28–38–12	68

April: 2–0–0 (home: 2–0–0; road: 0–0–0), 4 points

#	Date	Visitor	Score	Home	Location	Record	Points
79	Apr 2	New Jersey Devils	2–6	Pittsburgh Penguins	Civic Arena	29–38–12	70
80	Apr 4	Detroit Red Wings	3–4 OT	Pittsburgh Penguins	Civic Arena	30–38–12	72

Legend: Win (2 points) Loss (0 points) Tie (1 point)

== Player statistics ==
Skaters

Regular season
Player	GP	G	A	Pts	+/−	PIM
Mario Lemieux	63	54	53	107	13	57
Dan Quinn^{†}	64	28	43	71	14	40
Randy Cunneyworth	79	26	27	53	14	142
Craig Simpson	72	26	25	51	11	57
Terry Ruskowski	70	14	37	51	8	145
Doug Bodger	76	11	38	49	6	52
Moe Mantha Jr.	62	9	31	40	–6	44
John Chabot	72	14	22	36	–7	8
Bob Errey	72	16	18	34	–5	46
Jim Johnson	80	5	25	30	–6	116
Kevin LaVallee	33	8	20	28	–2	4
Dan Frawley	78	14	14	28	–10	218
Dave Hannan	58	10	15	25	–2	56
Willy Lindström	60	10	13	23	9	6
Ville Sirén	69	5	17	22	8	50
Warren Young	50	8	13	21	–5	103
Rod Buskas	68	3	15	18	2	123
Ron Duguay^{‡}	40	5	13	18	–8	30
Chris Kontos	31	8	9	17	–6	6
Troy Loney	23	8	7	15	0	22
Randy Hillier	55	4	8	12	12	97
Mike Bullard^{‡}	14	2	10	12	–5	17
Dwight Schofield	25	1	6	7	4	59
Norm Schmidt	20	1	5	6	–8	4
Jim McGeough	11	1	4	5	–5	8
Phil Bourque	22	2	3	5	–2	32
Mitch Wilson	17	2	1	3	–3	83
Mike Blaisdell	10	1	1	2	2	2
Lee Giffin	8	1	1	2	2	0
Chris Dahlquist	19	0	1	1	–2	20
Dwight Mathiasen	6	0	1	1	–1	2
Neil Belland	3	0	1	1	0	0
Alain Lemieux	1	0	0	0	–1	0
Todd Charlesworth	1	0	0	0	0	0
Mike Rowe	2	0	0	0	–2	0
Carl Mokosak	3	0	0	0	–4	4
Total		297	497	794	—	1,653

Goaltenders

Regular Season
Player	GP	TOI	W	L	T	GA	GAA	SA	SV%	SO
Gilles Meloche	43	2343:00	13	19	7	134	3.43	1123	0.881	0
Roberto Romano^{‡}	25	1438:00	9	11	2	87	3.63	713	0.878	0
Patrick Riggin^{†}	17	988:00	8	6	3	55	3.34	465	0.882	0
Steve Guenette	2	113:00	0	2	0	8	4.25	54	0.852	0
Total		4882:00	30	38	12	284	3.49	2355	0.879	0

^{†}Denotes player acquired mid-season. Stats reflect time with the Penguins only.
^{‡}Denotes player was traded mid-season. Stats reflect time with the Penguins only.

== Awards and records ==
- Mario Lemieux established a new franchise record for goals in a season with 54, besting the previous high of 53 held by Pierre Larouche (1976).

== Transactions ==
The Penguins were involved in the following transactions during the 1986–87 season:

=== Trades ===
October 3, 1986	To Buffalo Sabres cash	To Pittsburgh Penguins Craig Muni
October 8, 1986	To Washington Capitals cash	To Pittsburgh Penguins Dwight Schofield
October 9, 1986	To Detroit Red Wings cash	To Pittsburgh Penguins Warren Young
November 12, 1986	To Calgary Flames Mike Bullard	To Pittsburgh Penguins Dan Quinn
January 21, 1987	To New York Rangers Ron Duguay	To Pittsburgh Penguins Chris Kontos
February 6, 1987	To Boston Bruins Roberto Romano	To Pittsburgh Penguins Pat Riggin
May 29, 1987	To Detroit Red Wings Warren Young	To Pittsburgh Penguins cash

=== Additions and subtractions ===
Additions
Player	Former team	Via
Carl Mokosak	Philadelphia Flyers	free agency (1986-07-23)
Mitch Wilson	New Jersey Devils	free agency (1986-07-24)
Kevin LaVallee	St. Louis Blues	free agency (1986-09-13)
Neil Belland	Vancouver Canucks	free agency (1986-09-29)
Alain Lemieux	Quebec Nordiques	free agency (1986-12)

Subtractions
Player	New team	Via
Tom Roulston	EC Salzburg (Austria)	free agency
Mitch Lamoureux	Philadelphia Flyers	free agency (1986-06-30)
Andy Brickley	New Jersey Devils	free agency (1986-07-08)
Tom O'Regan	Detroit Red Wings	free agency (1986-09-29)

== Draft picks ==
The 1986 NHL entry draft was held on June 21, 1986, in Montreal.

Round	#	Player	Pos	Nationality	College/Junior/Club team (League)
1	4	Zarley Zalapski	Defense	Canada	Canadian National Team (Intl)
2	25	Dave Capuano	Left wing	United States	Mount St. Charles H.S. (R.I.)
3	46	Brad Aitken	Left wing	Canada	Sault Ste. Marie Greyhounds (OHL)
4	67	Robert Brown	Right wing	Canada	Kamloops Blazers (WHL)
5	88	Sandy Smith	Right wing	United States	Brainerd H.S. (Minn.)
6	109	Jeff Daniels	Left wing	Canada	Oshawa Generals (OHL)
7	130	Doug Hobson	Defense	Canada	Prince Albert Raiders (WHL)
8	151	Steve Rohlik	Left wing	United States	Hill-Murray H.S. (Minn.)
9	172	Dave McLlwain	Center	Canada	North Bay Centennials (OHL)
10	193	Kelly Cain	Center	Canada	London Knights (OHL)
11	214	Stan Drulia	Right wing	United States	Belleville Bulls (OHL)
12	235	Robert Wilson	Defense	Canada	Sudbury Wolves (OHL)
S1	3	Jeff Lamb	Forward	United States	University of Denver (WCHA)
S2	7	Randy Taylor	Defense	Canada	Harvard University (ECAC)

== See also ==
- 1986–87 NHL season
