= 1986–87 Detroit Red Wings season =

Sports season

1986–87 Detroit Red Wings
- Division: 2nd Norris
- Conference: 5th Campbell
- 1986–87 record: 34–36–10
- Home record: 20–14–6
- Road record: 14–22–4
- Goals for: 260
- Goals against: 274

Team information
- General manager: Jim Devellano
- Coach: Jacques Demers
- Assistant coach: Dan Belisle; Colin Campbell; Dave Dryden; Don MacAdam
- Captain: Steve Yzerman
- Alternate captains: Gerard Gallant; Tim Higgins; Lee Norwood; Mike O'Connell; John Ogrodnick
- Arena: Joe Louis Arena

Team leaders
- Goals: Gerard Gallant (38)
- Assists: Steve Yzerman (59)
- Points: Steve Yzerman (90)
- Penalty minutes: Joe Kocur (276)
- Plus/minus: Darren Veitch (13)
- Wins: Greg Stefan (20)
- Goals against average: Glen Hanlon (3.20)

The 1986–87 Detroit Red Wings season saw the Red Wings finish in second place in the Norris Division (NHL) with a record of 34 wins, 36 losses, and 10 draws for 78 points, a 38-point improvement from the previous season. Despite losing nine of their last 14 regular season games, the Red Wings swept the Chicago Blackhawks in four games in the opening round, rallied from a 3–1 deficit against the Toronto Maple Leafs in the division final, before falling to the eventual Stanley Cup champion Edmonton Oilers in five games in the Campbell Conference final. This season marked a turning point for the franchise, after making the playoffs just four times between 1967 and 1986, the Red Wings missed the playoffs only once between 1987 and 2016 (1989–90).

== Regular season ==
=== Final standings ===
Norris Division
	GP	W	L	T	GF	GA	Pts
**St. Louis Blues**	80	32	33	15	281	293	79
**Detroit Red Wings**	80	34	36	10	260	274	78
**Chicago Blackhawks**	80	29	37	14	290	310	72
**Toronto Maple Leafs**	80	32	42	6	286	319	70
Minnesota North Stars	80	30	40	10	296	314	70

Note: GP = Games played, W = Wins, L = Losses, T = Ties, Pts = Points, GF = Goals for, GA = Goals against
Note: Teams that qualified for the playoffs are highlighted in bold.

=== Record vs. opponents ===
Norris Division record vs. opponents

==== Vs. Campbell Conference ====
**Vs. Norris Division**

1986–87 NHL records
Team	**CHI**	**DET**	**MIN**	**STL**	**TOR**	**Total**
Chicago	—	3–4–1	2–4–2	1–3–4	4–4	**10–15–7**
Detroit	4–3–1	—	7–0–1	3–4–1	2–5–1	**16–12–4**
Minnesota	4–2–2	0–7–1	—	2–5–1	6–2	**12–16–4**
St. Louis	3–1–4	4–3–1	5–2–1	—	5–2–1	**17–8–7**
Toronto	4–4	5–2–1	2–6	2–5–1	—	**13–17–2**

**Vs. Smythe Division**

1986–87 NHL records
Team	**CGY**	**EDM**	**LAK**	**VAN**	**WIN**	**Total**
Chicago	0–3	2–1	1–1–1	1–1–1	3–0	**7–6–2**
Detroit	2–1	0–3	0–3	2–1	1–1–1	**5–9–1**
Minnesota	1–1–1	0–2–1	2–0–1	3–0	1–2	**7–5–3**
St. Louis	2–1	0–3	1–1–1	0–2–1	0–1–2	**3–8–4**
Toronto	1–2	1–2	1–1–1	1–2	2–1	**6–8–1**

**Vs. Wales Conference**

**Vs. Adams Division**

1986–87 NHL records
Team	**BOS**	**BUF**	**HFD**	**MTL**	**QUE**	**Total**
Chicago	1–1–1	1–2	2–1	0–2–1	1–2	**5–8–2**
Detroit	2–0–1	0–2–1	1–1–1	1–1–1	2–1	**6–5–4**
Minnesota	0–3	3–0	2–1	1–2	0–2–1	**6–8–1**
St. Louis	1–2	2–1	1–2	1–2	3–0	**8–7–0**
Toronto	1–2	2–0–1	1–2	1–2	0–3	**5–9–1**

**Vs. Patrick Division**

1986–87 NHL records
Team	**NJD**	**NYI**	**NYR**	**PHI**	**PIT**	**WSH**	**Total**
Chicago	2–1	2–1	1–1–1	0–2–1	1–2	1–1–1	**7–8–3**
Detroit	1–2	1–2	2–1	1–2	2–1	0–2–1	**7–10–1**
Minnesota	2–1	0–3	1–1–1	2–1	0–3	0–2–1	**5–11–2**
St. Louis	1–2	1–1–1	2–1	0–3	0–1–2	0–2–1	**4–10–4**
Toronto	2–1	1–2	1–1–1	1–1–1	2–1	1–2	**8–8–2**

== Schedule and results ==
1986–87 regular season
October

Game	Result	Date	Score	Opponent	Record
1	L	October 9, 1986	1–6	@ Quebec Nordiques (1986–87)	0–1–0
2	W	October 11, 1986	4–3	Chicago Blackhawks (1986–87)	1–1–0
3	L	October 15, 1986	3–4 OT	Los Angeles Kings (1986–87)	1–2–0
4	L	October 17, 1986	3–4	@ Edmonton Oilers (1986–87)	1–3–0
5	W	October 18, 1986	5–3	@ Calgary Flames (1986–87)	2–3–0
6	L	October 22, 1986	3–4	Montreal Canadiens (1986–87)	2–4–0
7	T	October 24, 1986	1–1 OT	St. Louis Blues (1986–87)	2–4–1
8	W	October 25, 1986	3–1	@ St. Louis Blues (1986–87)	3–4–1
9	W	October 29, 1986	5–2	Chicago Blackhawks (1986–87)	4–4–1
10	W	October 30, 1986	3–1	@ Minnesota North Stars (1986–87)	5–4–1

November

Game	Result	Date	Score	Opponent	Record
11	L	November 1, 1986	0–2	@ Toronto Maple Leafs (1986–87)	5–5–1
12	W	November 5, 1986	5–4 OT	New York Rangers (1986–87)	6–5–1
13	L	November 8, 1986	1–2 OT	@ New York Islanders (1986–87)	6–6–1
14	W	November 9, 1986	2–1	Pittsburgh Penguins (1986–87)	7–6–1
15	L	November 12, 1986	3–5	@ New Jersey Devils (1986–87)	7–7–1
16	L	November 13, 1986	5–7	@ Philadelphia Flyers (1986–87)	7–8–1
17	L	November 15, 1986	0–6	@ Toronto Maple Leafs (1986–87)	7–9–1
18	L	November 19, 1986	3–4	New Jersey Devils (1986–87)	7–10–1
19	T	November 21, 1986	3–3 OT	Washington Capitals (1986–87)	7–10–2
20	W	November 22, 1986	4–3	@ Montreal Canadiens (1986–87)	8–10–2
21	L	November 26, 1986	1–3	Toronto Maple Leafs (1986–87)	8–11–2
22	L	November 28, 1986	1–2 OT	St. Louis Blues (1986–87)	8–12–2
23	W	November 29, 1986	4–2	@ St. Louis Blues (1986–87)	9–12–2

December

Game	Result	Date	Score	Opponent	Record
24	L	December 2, 1986	4–5	@ Los Angeles Kings (1986–87)	9–13–2
25	T	December 5, 1986	3–3 OT	Montreal Canadiens (1986–87)	9–13–3
26	W	December 6, 1986	4–1	@ Hartford Whalers (1986–87)	10–13–3
27	T	December 9, 1986	5–5 OT	Buffalo Sabres (1986–87)	10–13–4
28	T	December 11, 1986	6–6 OT	Minnesota North Stars (1986–87)	10–13–5
29	L	December 16, 1986	3–8	@ Calgary Flames (1986–87)	10–14–5
30	W	December 17, 1986	5–4	@ Vancouver Canucks (1986–87)	11–14–5
31	T	December 20, 1986	2–2 OT	Hartford Whalers (1986–87)	11–14–6
32	L	December 21, 1986	4–7	@ Chicago Blackhawks (1986–87)	11–15–6
33	W	December 23, 1986	3–1	Chicago Blackhawks (1986–87)	12–15–6
34	W	December 26, 1986	4–2	Toronto Maple Leafs (1986–87)	13–15–6
35	T	December 27, 1986	5–5 OT	@ Toronto Maple Leafs (1986–87)	13–15–7
36	W	December 31, 1986	6–4	Calgary Flames (1986–87)	14–15–7

January

Game	Result	Date	Score	Opponent	Record
37	W	January 2, 1987	2–1	Minnesota North Stars (1986–87)	15–15–7
38	W	January 3, 1987	3–2	@ Minnesota North Stars (1986–87)	16–15–7
39	L	January 6, 1987	1–3	Toronto Maple Leafs (1986–87)	16–16–7
40	T	January 8, 1987	4–4 OT	@ Boston Bruins (1986–87)	16–16–8
41	L	January 10, 1987	2–5	Winnipeg Jets (1986–87)	16–17–8
42	L	January 11, 1987	3–5	@ Chicago Blackhawks (1986–87)	16–18–8
43	L	January 13, 1987	3–5	Edmonton Oilers (1986–87)	16–19–8
44	L	January 15, 1987	1–3	Toronto Maple Leafs (1986–87)	16–20–8
45	W	January 17, 1987	3–2	Quebec Nordiques (1986–87)	17–20–8
46	W	January 18, 1987	1–0	@ Pittsburgh Penguins (1986–87)	18–20–8
47	W	January 21, 1987	8–5	New York Islanders (1986–87)	19–20–8
48	W	January 23, 1987	4–3	St. Louis Blues (1986–87)	20–20–8
49	L	January 24, 1987	3–5	@ St. Louis Blues (1986–87)	20–21–8
50	L	January 28, 1987	1–2	Washington Capitals (1986–87)	20–22–8
51	W	January 31, 1987	4–2	@ Toronto Maple Leafs (1986–87)	21–22–8

February

Game	Result	Date	Score	Opponent	Record
52	L	February 1, 1987	1–6	@ Buffalo Sabres (1986–87)	21–23–8
53	L	February 4, 1987	4–5	@ Chicago Blackhawks (1986–87)	21–24–8
54	W	February 6, 1987	6–4	Minnesota North Stars (1986–87)	22–24–8
55	W	February 7, 1987	5–3	@ Minnesota North Stars (1986–87)	23–24–8
56	W	February 14, 1987	5–1	New Jersey Devils (1986–87)	24–24–8
57	L	February 17, 1987	2–6	@ New York Rangers (1986–87)	24–25–8
58	W	February 18, 1987	5–2	Winnipeg Jets (1986–87)	25–25–8
59	W	February 20, 1987	6–3	Quebec Nordiques (1986–87)	26–25–8
60	T	February 22, 1987	2–2 OT	@ Chicago Blackhawks (1986–87)	26–25–9
61	L	February 24, 1987	2–8	@ Washington Capitals (1986–87)	26–26–9
62	W	February 26, 1987	5–4	Vancouver Canucks (1986–87)	27–26–9
63	W	February 28, 1987	4–1	New York Rangers (1986–87)	28–26–9

March

Game	Result	Date	Score	Opponent	Record
64	W	March 2, 1987	4–3 OT	@ Boston Bruins (1986–87)	29–26–9
65	L	March 3, 1987	3–5	@ Hartford Whalers (1986–87)	29–27–9
66	W	March 5, 1987	9–3	Minnesota North Stars (1986–87)	30–27–9
67	L	March 7, 1987	3–5	@ St. Louis Blues (1986–87)	30–28–9
68	L	March 10, 1987	4–7	@ Vancouver Canucks (1986–87)	30–29–9
69	L	March 11, 1987	3–6	@ Edmonton Oilers (1986–87)	30–30–9
70	W	March 14, 1987	4–3	@ Minnesota North Stars (1986–87)	31–30–9
71	T	March 15, 1987	1–1 OT	@ Winnipeg Jets (1986–87)	31–30–10
72	W	March 17, 1987	3–1	Boston Bruins (1986–87)	32–30–10
73	L	March 19, 1987	2–3	New York Islanders (1986–87)	32–31–10
74	W	March 21, 1987	3–0	Chicago Blackhawks (1986–87)	33–31–10
75	L	March 22, 1987	2–3	@ Buffalo Sabres (1986–87)	33–32–10
76	L	March 25, 1987	1–6	Los Angeles Kings (1986–87)	33–33–10
77	W	March 28, 1987	5–1	@ Philadelphia Flyers (1986–87)	34–33–10

April

Game	Result	Date	Score	Opponent	Record
78	L	April 1, 1987	1–2	Philadelphia Flyers (1986–87)	34–34–10
79	L	April 4, 1987	3–4 OT	@ Pittsburgh Penguins (1986–87)	34–35–10
80	L	April 5, 1987	2–3 OT	St. Louis Blues (1986–87)	34–36–10

Legend: Win (2 points) Loss (0 points) Tie (1 point)

=== Playoffs ===
The Red Wings finished the season 34–36–10, a major improvement over the disastrous 1985–86 campaign. Just missing out on first place in the Norris Division, the Wings faced rival, Chicago in Round One. Detroit stunned the Blackhawks in a 4-game sweep, the franchise's first series victory since 1977–78. In the Norris Finals, Detroit faced another archrival, the Toronto Maple Leafs. The Leafs jumped out to a 3–1 series lead, but Detroit stormed back, winning the series in seven games, including a 3–0 win in the deciding game. The Red Wings then faced the heavily favored Edmonton Oilers in the Campbell Conference Finals. Detroit took Game One, but the Oilers would eventually take the series in five games. Edmonton would go on to win the Stanley Cup.

== Player statistics ==
=== Regular season ===
Scoring

Player	Pos	GP	G	A	Pts	PIM	+/-	PPG	SHG	GWG
Steve Yzerman	C	80	31	59	90	43	-1	9	1	2
Gerard Gallant	LW	80	38	34	72	216	-5	17	0	4
Darren Veitch	D	77	13	45	58	52	14	7	1	2
Petr Klima	W	77	30	23	53	42	-9	6	0	5
Shawn Burr	LW/C	80	22	25	47	107	2	1	2	1
Adam Oates	C	76	15	32	47	21	0	4	0	1
John Ogrodnick	LW	39	12	28	40	6	-2	4	1	1
Brent Ashton	LW	35	15	16	31	22	-3	3	1	3
Mike O'Connell	D	77	5	26	31	70	-25	3	1	0
Lee Norwood	D	57	6	21	27	163	-23	4	0	2
Dave Barr	RW	37	13	13	26	49	7	4	0	5
Tim Higgins	RW	77	12	14	26	124	-2	0	1	1
Bob Probert	LW	63	13	11	24	221	-6	2	0	0
Joe Kocur	RW	77	9	9	18	276	-10	2	0	2
Doug Shedden	C	33	6	12	18	6	3	1	0	1
Harold Snepsts	D	54	1	13	14	129	7	0	0	0
Ric Seiling	RW/C	74	3	8	11	49	-4	0	0	0
Randy Ladouceur	D	34	3	6	9	70	-4	1	0	1
Dave Lewis	D	58	2	5	7	66	12	0	0	0
Gilbert Delorme	D	24	2	3	5	33	-1	0	0	0
Steve Chiasson	D	45	1	4	5	73	-7	0	0	0
Rick Zombo	D	44	1	4	5	59	-6	0	0	0
Mel Bridgman	C	13	2	2	4	19	1	0	1	1
Basil McRae	LW	36	2	2	4	193	-3	1	0	1
Greg Stefan	G	43	0	4	4	24	0	0	0	0
Mark Lamb	C	22	2	1	3	8	0	0	0	0
Billy Carroll	C	31	1	2	3	6	-9	0	0	1
Doug Halward	D	11	0	3	3	19	4	0	0	0
Mark Kumpel	RW	5	0	1	1	0	2	0	0	0
Mark Laforest	G	5	0	1	1	7	0	0	0	0
Joe Murphy	RW	5	0	1	1	2	0	0	0	0
Jeff Sharples	D	3	0	1	1	2	0	0	0	0
Chris Cichocki	RW	2	0	0	0	2	-2	0	0	0
Glen Hanlon	G	36	0	0	0	20	0	0	0	0
Eddie Johnstone	RW	6	0	0	0	0	1	0	0	0
Dale Krentz	LW	8	0	0	0	0	-2	0	0	0
Sam St. Laurent	G	6	0	0	0	0	0	0	0	0

Goaltending

Player	MIN	GP	W	L	T	GA	GAA	SO	SA	SV	SV%
Greg Stefan	2351	43	20	17	3	135	3.45	1	1082	947	.875
Glen Hanlon	1963	36	11	16	5	104	3.18	1	975	871	.893
Mark Laforest	219	5	2	1	0	12	3.29	0	111	99	.892
Sam St. Laurent	342	6	1	2	2	16	2.81	0	135	119	.881
Team:	4875	80	34	36	10	267	3.29	2	2303	2036	.884

=== Playoffs ===
Scoring

Player	Pos	GP	G	A	Pts	PIM	PPG	SHG	GWG
Steve Yzerman	C	16	5	13	18	8	1	0	0
Gerard Gallant	LW	16	8	6	14	43	2	0	0
Brent Ashton	LW	16	4	9	13	6	2	0	0
Adam Oates	C	16	4	7	11	6	0	0	1
Shawn Burr	LW/C	16	7	2	9	20	0	0	2
Mel Bridgman	C	16	5	2	7	28	0	1	1
Bob Probert	LW	16	3	4	7	63	1	0	1
Darren Veitch	D	12	3	4	7	8	2	0	1
Lee Norwood	D	16	1	6	7	31	0	0	1
Joe Kocur	RW	16	2	3	5	71	1	0	2
Mike O'Connell	D	16	1	4	5	14	0	0	0
Dave Lewis	D	14	0	4	4	10	0	0	0
Petr Klima	W	13	1	2	3	4	0	0	0
Gilbert Delorme	D	16	0	2	2	14	0	0	0
Harold Snepsts	D	11	0	2	2	18	0	0	0
Greg Stefan	G	9	0	2	2	0	0	0	0
Dave Barr	RW	13	1	0	1	14	0	0	0
Tim Higgins	RW	12	0	1	1	16	0	0	0
Rick Zombo	D	7	0	1	1	9	0	0	0
Steve Chiasson	D	2	0	0	0	19	0	0	0
Glen Hanlon	G	8	0	0	0	2	0	0	0
Mark Kumpel	RW	8	0	0	0	4	0	0	0
Mark Lamb	C	11	0	0	0	11	0	0	0
Ric Seiling	RW/C	7	0	0	0	5	0	0	0
Jeff Sharples	D	2	0	0	0	2	0	0	0

Goaltending

Player	MIN	GP	W	L	GA	GAA	SO	SA	SV	SV%
Glen Hanlon	467	8	5	2	13	1.67	2	227	214	.943
Greg Stefan	508	9	4	5	24	2.83	0	252	228	.905
Team:	975	16	9	7	37	2.28	2	479	442	.923

Note: GP = Games played; G = Goals; A = Assists; Pts = Points; +/- = Plus-minus PIM = Penalty minutes; PPG = Power-play goals; SHG = Short-handed goals; GWG = Game-winning goals;
MIN = Minutes played; W = Wins; L = Losses; T = Ties; GA = Goals against; GAA = Goals-against average; SO = Shutouts; SA=Shots against; SV=Shots saved; SV% = Save percentage;

== Draft picks ==
Detroit's draft picks at the 1986 NHL entry draft held at the Montreal Forum in Montreal. The Red Wings initially selected Ian Kidd first overall in the 1986 NHL supplemental draft, but the claim was invalidated after it was determined Kidd didn't meet eligibility requirements.

Round	#	Player	Nationality	College/Junior/Club team (League)
1	1	Joe Murphy	Canada	Michigan State University (CCHA)
2	22	Adam Graves	Canada	Windsor Compuware Spitfires (OHL)
3	43	Derek Mayer	Canada	University of Denver (WCHA)
4	64	Tim Cheveldae	Canada	Saskatoon Blades (WHL)
5	85	Johan Garpenlov	Sweden	Nacka HK (Sweden)
6	106	Jay Stark	Canada	Portland Winter Hawks (WHL)
7	127	Par Djoos	Sweden	Mora IK (Sweden)
8	148	Dean Morton	Canada	Oshawa Generals (OHL)
9	169	Marc Potvin	Canada	Stratford Cullitons (WOJBHL)
10	190	Scott King	Canada	Vernon Lakers (BCJHL)
11	211	Tom Bissett	United States	Michigan Technological University (WCHA)
12	232	Peter Ekroth	Sweden	Södertälje SK (Sweden)
S2	5	Rob Doyle	Canada	Colorado College (WCHA)

== See also ==
- 1986–87 NHL season
