= 1986–87 New Jersey Devils season =

National Hockey League season

1986–87 New Jersey Devils
- Division: 6th Patrick
- Conference: 10th Wales
- 1986–87 record: 29–45–6
- Home record: 20–17–3
- Road record: 9–28–3
- Goals for: 293
- Goals against: 368

Team information
- General manager: Max McNab
- Coach: Doug Carpenter
- Captain: Mel Bridgman
- Alternate captains: Unknown
- Arena: Brendan Byrne Arena

Team leaders
- Goals: Pat Verbeek (35)
- Assists: Aaron Broten (53)
- Points: Aaron Broten (79)
- Penalty minutes: Ken Daneyko (183)
- Plus/minus: Aaron Broten (+5)
- Wins: Alain Chevrier (24)
- Goals against average: Kirk McLean (3.75)

The 1986–87 New Jersey Devils season was the 13th season for the National Hockey League (NHL) franchise that was established on June 11, 1974, and fifth season since the franchise relocated from Colorado prior to the 1982–83 NHL season. This was the franchise's ninth consecutive season out of the playoffs.

== Regular season ==
- January 22, 1987 – A snowstorm brutally hit New Jersey as the Devils were scheduled to play the Calgary Flames at the Meadowlands. Only 334 fans showed up, making that game the "334 Club" game. To this day, it is the lowest-attended game in modern NHL history, not counting the 2020 NHL return to play playoffs. The Devils went on to win the game 7–5.

=== Final standings ===
Patrick Division
	GP	W	L	T	GF	GA	Pts
**Philadelphia Flyers**	80	46	26	8	310	245	100
**Washington Capitals**	80	38	32	10	285	278	86
**New York Islanders**	80	35	33	12	279	281	82
**New York Rangers**	80	34	38	8	307	323	76
Pittsburgh Penguins	80	30	38	12	297	290	72
New Jersey Devils	80	29	45	6	293	368	64

Note: GP = Games played, W = Wins, L = Losses, T = Ties, Pts = Points, GF = Goals for, GA = Goals against
Note: Teams that qualified for the playoffs are highlighted in bold.

=== Record vs. opponents ===
Patrick Division record vs. opponents

==== Vs. Wales Conference ====
**Vs. Patrick Division**

1986–87 NHL records
Team	**NJD**	**NYI**	**NYR**	**PHI**	**PIT**	**WSH**	**Total**
New Jersey	—	2–5	4–3	2–4–1	4–3	1–6	13–21–1
N.Y. Islanders	5–2	—	3–3–1	3–4	5–0–2	2–3–2	18–12–2
N.Y. Rangers	3–4	3–3–1	—	4–3	3–2–2	4–3	17–15–3
Philadelphia	4–2–1	4–3	3–4	—	4–1–2	5–1–1	20–11–4
Pittsburgh	3–4	0–5–2	2–3–2	1–4–2	—	4–3	10–19–6
Washington	6–1	3–2–2	3–4	1–5–1	3–4	—	16–16–3

**Vs. Adams Division**

1986–87 NHL records
Team	**BOS**	**BUF**	**HFD**	**MTL**	**QUE**	**Total**
New Jersey	1–1–1	1–2	1–1–1	1–2	0–1–2	4–7–4
N.Y. Islanders	0–2–1	1–1–1	1–2	1–1–1	2–1	5–7–3
N.Y. Rangers	2–1	2–1	0–3	0–2–1	2–1	6–8–1
Philadelphia	2–1	2–1	1–2	2–0–1	2–0–1	9–4–2
Pittsburgh	1–2	2–0–1	0–3	1–1–1	3–0	7–6–2
Washington	1–1–1	1–2	1–2	3–0	0–2–1	6–7–2

==== Vs. Campbell Conference ====
**Vs. Norris Division**

1986–87 NHL records
Team	**CHI**	**DET**	**MIN**	**STL**	**TOR**	**Total**
New Jersey	1–2	2–1	1–2	2–1	1–2	7–8–0
N.Y. Islanders	1–2	2–1	3–0	1–1–1	2–1	9–5–1
N.Y. Rangers	1–1–1	1–2	1–1–1	1–2	1–1–1	5–7–3
Philadelphia	2–0–1	2–1	1–2	3–0	1–1–1	9–4–2
Pittsburgh	2–1	1–2	3–0	1–0–2	1–2	8–5–2
Washington	1–1–1	2–0–1	2–0–1	2–0–1	2–1	9–2–4

**Vs. Smythe Division**

1986–87 NHL records
Team	**CGY**	**EDM**	**LAK**	**VAN**	**WIN**	**Total**
New Jersey	1–2	1–2	1–2	2–0–1	0–3	5–9–1
N.Y. Islanders	0–2–1	0–2–1	1–2	1–2	1–1–1	3–9–2
N.Y. Rangers	1–2	0–3	2–0–1	2–1	1–2	6–8–1
Philadelphia	1–2	2–1	1–2	2–1	2–1	8–7–0
Pittsburgh	1–2	1–2	1–2	1–0–2	1–2	5–8–2
Washington	1–2	2–1	0–3	3–0	1–1–1	7–7–1

== Schedule and results ==
1986–87 regular season
October

Game	Result	Date	Score	Opponent	Record
1	W	October 9, 1986	5–3	@ New York Rangers (season)	1–0–0
2	W	October 11, 1986	5–4	Boston Bruins (season)	2–0–0
3	W	October 15, 1986	3–2	Vancouver Canucks (season)	3–0–0
4	L	October 17, 1986	2–3	Toronto Maple Leafs (season)	3–1–0
5	L	October 18, 1986	4–8	@ Pittsburgh Penguins (season)	3–2–0
6	L	October 21, 1986	3–6	@ New York Islanders (season)	3–3–0
7	W	October 23, 1986	5–3	Los Angeles Kings (season)	4–3–0
8	L	October 25, 1986	1–2	@ Washington Capitals (season)	4–4–0
9	W	October 29, 1986	8–6	@ Pittsburgh Penguins (season)	5–4–0
10	W	October 30, 1986	7–6 OT	New York Islanders (season)	6–4–0

November

Game	Result	Date	Score	Opponent	Record
11	L	November 1, 1986	1–3	Buffalo Sabres (season)	6–5–0
12	L	November 4, 1986	1–7	@ Philadelphia Flyers (season)	6–6–0
13	T	November 6, 1986	5–5 OT	Philadelphia Flyers (season)	6–6–1
14	L	November 9, 1986	1–8	@ Winnipeg Jets (season)	6–7–1
15	W	November 12, 1986	5–3	Detroit Red Wings (season)	7–7–1
16	W	November 14, 1986	5–4	Pittsburgh Penguins (season)	8–7–1
17	T	November 15, 1986	5–5 OT	@ Boston Bruins (season)	8–7–2
18	W	November 17, 1986	3–2	New York Rangers (season)	9–7–2
19	W	November 19, 1986	4–3	@ Detroit Red Wings (season)	10–7–2
20	L	November 22, 1986	2–6	@ Minnesota North Stars (season)	10–8–2
21	L	November 23, 1986	3–5	@ Chicago Blackhawks (season)	10–9–2
22	W	November 26, 1986	5–1	@ St. Louis Blues (season)	11–9–2
23	L	November 29, 1986	6–9	@ Los Angeles Kings (season)	11–10–2

December

Game	Result	Date	Score	Opponent	Record
24	W	December 2, 1986	8–5	New York Rangers (season)	12–10–2
25	L	December 4, 1986	3–5	Minnesota North Stars (season)	12–11–2
26	W	December 6, 1986	4–3	Buffalo Sabres (season)	13–11–2
27	L	December 9, 1986	2–4	@ Washington Capitals (season)	13–12–2
28	L	December 11, 1986	4–8	New York Islanders (season)	13–13–2
29	L	December 13, 1986	2–4	@ New York Islanders (season)	13–14–2
30	W	December 14, 1986	4–2	Montreal Canadiens (season)	14–14–2
31	W	December 17, 1986	3–2 OT	Toronto Maple Leafs (season)	15–14–2
32	W	December 19, 1986	6–4	Washington Capitals (season)	16–14–2
33	L	December 20, 1986	2–5	@ Montreal Canadiens (season)	16–15–2
34	L	December 23, 1986	5–8	@ New York Rangers (season)	16–16–2
35	L	December 26, 1986	4–7	New York Rangers (season)	16–17–2
36	T	December 27, 1986	2–2 OT	@ Quebec Nordiques (season)	16–17–3
37	L	December 30, 1986	3–4	Calgary Flames (season)	16–18–3

January

Game	Result	Date	Score	Opponent	Record
38	L	January 2, 1987	2–7	Boston Bruins (season)	16–19–3
39	L	January 3, 1987	2–7	@ Toronto Maple Leafs (season)	16–20–3
40	L	January 6, 1987	0–4	@ Philadelphia Flyers (season)	16–21–3
41	T	January 8, 1987	4–4 OT	Quebec Nordiques (season)	16–21–4
42	T	January 10, 1987	2–2 OT	Vancouver Canucks (season)	16–21–5
43	W	January 12, 1987	7–5	Hartford Whalers (season)	17–21–5
44	W	January 14, 1987	3–1	@ Chicago Blackhawks (season)	18–21–5
45	L	January 16, 1987	4–5	Winnipeg Jets (season)	18–22–5
46	L	January 18, 1987	1–6	Washington Capitals (season)	18–23–5
47	L	January 20, 1987	3–6	@ Washington Capitals (season)	18–24–5
48	W	January 22, 1987	7–5	Calgary Flames (season)	19–24–5
49	W	January 24, 1987	4–3	Philadelphia Flyers (season)	20–24–5
50	L	January 26, 1987	3–6	@ New York Rangers (season)	20–25–5
51	L	January 28, 1987	2–6	@ Los Angeles Kings (season)	20–26–5
52	W	January 30, 1987	4–3	@ Vancouver Canucks (season)	21–26–5
53	L	January 31, 1987	3–5	@ Calgary Flames (season)	21–27–5

February

Game	Result	Date	Score	Opponent	Record
54	W	February 7, 1987	3–2	Philadelphia Flyers (season)	22–27–5
55	L	February 8, 1987	1–2 OT	Pittsburgh Penguins (season)	22–28–5
56	L	February 14, 1987	1–5	@ Detroit Red Wings (season)	22–29–5
57	L	February 18, 1987	3–6	Hartford Whalers (season)	22–30–5
58	W	February 21, 1987	6–5	@ Pittsburgh Penguins (season)	23–30–5
59	L	February 22, 1987	0–7	New York Islanders (season)	23–31–5
60	W	February 25, 1987	4–2	Edmonton Oilers (season)	24–31–5
61	L	February 28, 1987	2–3	@ Montreal Canadiens (season)	24–32–5

March

Game	Result	Date	Score	Opponent	Record
62	T	March 1, 1987	5–5 OT	@ Hartford Whalers (season)	24–32–6
63	L	March 3, 1987	2–3	@ Washington Capitals (season)	24–33–6
64	L	March 5, 1987	4–6	@ Buffalo Sabres (season)	24–34–6
65	L	March 7, 1987	3–4	Chicago Blackhawks (season)	24–35–6
66	L	March 8, 1987	3–7	@ Philadelphia Flyers (season)	24–36–6
67	L	March 11, 1987	4–6	Philadelphia Flyers (season)	24–37–6
68	W	March 13, 1987	4–1	New York Islanders (season)	25–37–6
69	L	March 14, 1987	6–7 OT	@ New York Islanders (season)	25–38–6
70	L	March 17, 1987	4–7	@ Edmonton Oilers (season)	25–39–6
71	L	March 18, 1987	3–4 OT	@ Winnipeg Jets (season)	25–40–6
72	W	March 21, 1987	7–6 OT	@ St. Louis Blues (season)	26–40–6
73	L	March 23, 1987	6–7	Edmonton Oilers (season)	26–41–6
74	W	March 25, 1987	8–2	@ New York Rangers (season)	27–41–6
75	W	March 27, 1987	5–2	Minnesota North Stars (season)	28–41–6
76	L	March 29, 1987	1–4	St. Louis Blues (season)	28–42–6
77	W	March 31, 1987	5–3	Pittsburgh Penguins (season)	29–42–6

April

Game	Result	Date	Score	Opponent	Record
78	L	April 2, 1987	2–6	@ Pittsburgh Penguins (season)	29–43–6
79	L	April 4, 1987	4–8	@ Quebec Nordiques (season)	29–44–6
80	L	April 5, 1987	5–6 OT	Washington Capitals (season)	29–45–6

Legend: Win (2 points) Loss (0 points) Tie (1 point)

== Player statistics ==
=== Regular season ===
Scoring

Player	Pos	GP	G	A	Pts	PIM	+/-	PPG	SHG	GWG
Aaron Broten	LW/C	80	26	53	79	36	5	6	0	3
Kirk Muller	LW	79	26	50	76	75	-7	10	1	4
John MacLean	RW	80	31	36	67	120	-23	9	0	4
Pat Verbeek	RW	74	35	24	59	120	-23	17	0	5
Doug Sulliman	RW	78	27	26	53	14	-17	4	1	4
Mark Johnson	C	68	25	26	51	22	-21	11	2	0
Greg Adams	LW	72	20	27	47	19	-16	6	0	1
Claude Loiselle	C	75	16	24	40	137	-7	2	1	3
Mel Bridgman	C	51	8	31	39	80	-8	1	1	1
Bruce Driver	D	74	6	28	34	36	-26	0	0	0
Joe Cirella	D	65	9	22	31	111	-20	6	0	0
Andy Brickley	LW/C	51	11	12	23	8	-15	1	3	0
Peter McNab	C	46	8	12	20	8	-14	2	0	2
Uli Hiemer	D	40	6	14	20	45	-6	2	0	1
Anders Carlsson	C	48	2	18	20	14	-11	0	0	0
Perry Anderson	LW	57	10	9	19	107	-13	2	0	1
Randy Velischek	D	64	2	16	18	52	-12	0	0	0
Jan Ludvig	RW	47	7	9	16	98	-5	1	0	0
Ken Daneyko	D	79	2	12	14	183	-13	0	0	0
Rich Chernomaz	RW	25	6	4	10	8	-11	2	0	0
Craig Wolanin	D	68	4	6	10	109	-31	0	0	0
Gordon Mark	D	36	3	5	8	82	-4	0	0	0
Steve Richmond	D	44	1	7	8	143	-12	0	0	0
Tim Lenardon	C	7	1	1	2	0	-2	0	0	0
Timo Blomqvist	D	20	0	2	2	29	-3	0	0	0
Allan Stewart	LW	7	1	0	1	26	-4	0	0	0
Doug Brown	RW	4	0	1	1	0	-4	0	0	0
Karl Friesen	G	4	0	1	1	0	0	0	0	0
Craig Billington	G	22	0	0	0	12	0	0	0	0
Murray Brumwell	D	1	0	0	0	2	1	0	0	0
Alain Chevrier	G	58	0	0	0	17	0	0	0	0
Kirk McLean	G	4	0	0	0	0	0	0	0	0
Chris Terreri	G	7	0	0	0	0	0	0	0	0

Goaltending

Player	MIN	GP	W	L	T	GA	GAA	SO	SA	SV	SV%
Alain Chevrier	3153	58	24	26	2	227	4.32	0	1793	1566	.873
Craig Billington	1114	22	4	13	2	89	4.79	0	569	480	.844
Kirk McLean	160	4	1	1	0	10	3.75	0	73	63	.863
Karl Friesen	130	4	0	2	1	16	7.38	0	80	64	.800
Chris Terreri	286	7	0	3	1	21	4.41	0	173	152	.879
Team:	4843	80	29	45	6	363	4.50	0	2688	2325	.865

Note: GP = Games played; G = Goals; A = Assists; Pts = Points; +/- = Plus/minus; PIM = Penalty minutes; PPG = Power-play goals; SHG = Short-handed goals; GWG = Game-winning goals
MIN = Minutes played; W = Wins; L = Losses; T = Ties; GA = Goals against; GAA = Goals against average; SO = Shutouts; SA = Shots against; SV = Shots saved; SV% = Save percentage;

== Draft picks ==
New Jersey's draft picks at the 1986 NHL entry draft.

Rd #	Pick #	Player	Nat	Pos	Team (League)	Notes
1	3	Neil Brady	Canada	C	Medicine Hat Tigers (WHL)	
2	24	Todd Copeland	United States	D	Belmont Hill H.S. (Massachusetts)	(Note: Copeland was the first New Jersey native to be drafted by the Devils (from Ridgewood); however, he never played for them. Jim Dowd (Brick) is the first New Jerseyan to play for the Devils.)
3	45	Janne Ojanen	Finland	C	Tappara (SM-liiga)	
3	62	Marc Laniel	Canada	D	Oshawa Generals (OHL)	(Note: The Devils acquired the 1986 third-round pick from Philadelphia in exchange for Chico Resch on March 11, 1986.)
4	66	Anders Carlsson	Sweden	C	Södertälje SK (Elitserien)	
5	87	No fifth-round pick				(Note: The Devils traded their 1986 fifth-round pick (used on Mike Wolak), along with Shawn Evans to St. Louis for Mark Johnson on September 19, 1985.)
6	108	Troy Crowder	Canada	RW	Hamilton Steelhawks (OHL)	
7	129	Kevin Todd	Canada	C	Prince Albert Raiders (WHL)	
8	150	Ryan Pardoski	Canada	LW	Calgary Canucks (AJHL)	
9	171	Scott McCormack	United States	–	St. Paul's H.S. (New Hampshire)	
10	192	Frederic Chabot	Canada	G	St. Foy Foosters (Quebec AAA)	
11	213	John Andersen	Canada	LW	Oshawa Generals (OHL)	
12	236	Doug Kirton	Canada	RW	Orillia Travelways (OPJHL)	(Note: The Devils obtained this 1986 12th-round pick (Kirton) from Buffalo for Phil Russell on March 11, 1986. The Devils had traded their original 12th-round pick (used on Bill Butler) and Rick Meagher to St. Louis for Perry Anderson on August 29, 1985.)
S1	2	Glen Engevik	Canada	RW	University of Denver (WCHA)	
S2	6	Tim Barakett	United States	F	Harvard University (ECAC)	
