= 1986–87 Los Angeles Kings season =

National Hockey League team season

1986–87 Los Angeles Kings
- Division: 4th Smythe
- Conference: 8th Campbell
- 1986–87 record: 31–41–8
- Home record: 20–17–3
- Road record: 11–24–5
- Goals for: 318
- Goals against: 341

Team information
- General manager: Rogatien Vachon
- Coach: Pat Quinn, Mike Murphy
- Captain: Dave Taylor
- Arena: The Forum

Team leaders
- Goals: Luc Robitaille (45)
- Assists: Marcel Dionne (50)
- Points: Luc Robitaille (84)
- Penalty minutes: Tiger Williams (358)
- Plus/minus: Mark Hardy +16
- Wins: Roland Melanson (18)
- Goals against average: Roland Melanson (3.70)

The 1986–87 Los Angeles Kings season was the Kings' 20th season in the National Hockey League (NHL). The Kings made the playoffs, losing in the first round to the eventual Stanley Cup champion Edmonton Oilers.

== Regular season ==
=== Final standings ===
Smythe Division
	GP	W	L	T	GF	GA	Pts
**Edmonton Oilers**	80	50	24	6	372	284	106
**Calgary Flames**	80	46	31	3	318	289	95
**Winnipeg Jets**	80	40	32	8	279	271	88
**Los Angeles Kings**	80	31	41	8	318	341	70
Vancouver Canucks	80	29	43	8	282	314	66

Note: GP = Games played, W = Wins, L = Losses, T = Ties, Pts = Points, GF = Goals for, GA = Goals against
Note: Teams that qualified for the playoffs are highlighted in bold.

=== Record vs. opponents ===
Smythe Division record vs. opponents

==== Vs. Campbell Conference ====
**Vs. Smythe Division**

1986–87 NHL records
Team	**CGY**	**EDM**	**LAK**	**VAN**	**WIN**	**Total**
Calgary	—	6–1–1	5–3	4–4	2–6	**17–14–1**
Edmonton	1–6–1	—	4–2–2	7–0–1	5–3	**17–11–4**
Los Angeles	3–5	2–4–2	—	2–5–1	3–5	**10–19–3**
Vancouver	4–4	0–7–1	5–2–1	—	3–5	**12–18–2**
Winnipeg	6–2	3–5	5–3	5–3	—	**19–13–0**

**Vs. Norris Division**

1986–87 NHL records
Team	**CHI**	**DET**	**MIN**	**STL**	**TOR**	**Total**
Calgary	3–0	1–2	1–1–1	1–2	2–1	**8–6–1**
Edmonton	1–2	3–0	2–0–1	3–0	2–1	**11–3–1**
Los Angeles	1–1–1	3–0	0–2–1	1–1–1	1–1–1	**6–5–4**
Vancouver	1–1–1	1–2	0–3	2–0–1	2–1	**6–7–2**
Winnipeg	0–3	1–1–1	2–1	1–0–2	1–2	**5–7–3**

**Vs. Wales Conference**

**Vs. Adams Division**

1986–87 NHL records
Team	**BOS**	**BUF**	**HFD**	**MTL**	**QUE**	**Total**
Calgary	1–2	3–0	2–1	1–2	2–1	**9–6–0**
Edmonton	1–2	2–1	2–1	3–0	3–0	**11–4–0**
Los Angeles	1–2	1–2	2–1	0–3	0–3	**4–11–0**
Vancouver	1–2	3–0	0–2–1	2–1	1–2	**7–7–1**
Winnipeg	1–2	2–1	1–1–1	1–2	1–0–2	**6–6–3**

**Vs. Patrick Division**

1986–87 NHL records
Team	**NJD**	**NYI**	**NYR**	**PHI**	**PIT**	**WSH**	**Total**
Calgary	2–1	2–0–1	2–1	2–1	2–1	2–1	**12–5–1**
Edmonton	2–1	2–0–1	3–0	1–2	2–1	1–2	**11–6–1**
Los Angeles	2–1	2–1	0–2–1	2–1	2–1	3–0	**11–6–1**
Vancouver	0–2–1	2–1	1–2	1–2	0–1–2	0–3	**4–11–3**
Winnipeg	3–0	1–1–1	2–1	1–2	2–1	1–1–1	**10–6–2**

== Schedule and results ==
1986–87 regular season
October

Game	Result	Date	Score	Opponent	Record
1	L	October 9, 1986	3–4	St. Louis Blues (1986–87)	0–1–0
2	W	October 11, 1986	5–4	New York Islanders (1986–87)	1–1–0
3	L	October 14, 1986	3–4 OT	@ Pittsburgh Penguins (1986–87)	1–2–0
4	W	October 15, 1986	4–3 OT	@ Detroit Red Wings (1986–87)	2–2–0
5	L	October 18, 1986	1–4	Boston Bruins (1986–87)	2–3–0
6	W	October 19, 1986	7–6	Edmonton Oilers (1986–87)	3–3–0
7	L	October 22, 1986	4–5 OT	@ New York Rangers (1986–87)	3–4–0
8	L	October 23, 1986	3–5	@ New Jersey Devils (1986–87)	3–5–0
9	L	October 25, 1986	3–4	@ New York Islanders (1986–87)	3–6–0
10	L	October 27, 1986	5–6	@ Montreal Canadiens (1986–87)	3–7–0
11	L	October 28, 1986	2–6	@ Quebec Nordiques (1986–87)	3–8–0

November

Game	Result	Date	Score	Opponent	Record
12	T	November 2, 1986	5–5 OT	@ Edmonton Oilers (1986–87)	3–8–1
13	L	November 3, 1986	2–4	@ Calgary Flames (1986–87)	3–9–1
14	L	November 6, 1986	4–6	Montreal Canadiens (1986–87)	3–10–1
15	W	November 8, 1986	4–3	Hartford Whalers (1986–87)	4–10–1
16	W	November 11, 1986	4–3	Winnipeg Jets (1986–87)	5–10–1
17	L	November 13, 1986	5–6	Winnipeg Jets (1986–87)	5–11–1
18	W	November 15, 1986	4–1	Calgary Flames (1986–87)	6–11–1
19	W	November 18, 1986	6–5	@ Washington Capitals (1986–87)	7–11–1
20	T	November 19, 1986	4–4 OT	@ Chicago Blackhawks (1986–87)	7–11–2
21	W	November 21, 1986	4–1	@ Winnipeg Jets (1986–87)	8–11–2
22	L	November 23, 1986	2–3	@ Winnipeg Jets (1986–87)	8–12–2
23	L	November 25, 1986	5–11	@ Vancouver Canucks (1986–87)	8–13–2
24	L	November 26, 1986	3–5	Vancouver Canucks (1986–87)	8–14–2
25	W	November 29, 1986	9–6	New Jersey Devils (1986–87)	9–14–2

December

Game	Result	Date	Score	Opponent	Record
26	W	December 2, 1986	5–4	Detroit Red Wings (1986–87)	10–14–2
27	W	December 4, 1986	4–3	Toronto Maple Leafs (1986–87)	11–14–2
28	W	December 6, 1986	7–2	Chicago Blackhawks (1986–87)	12–14–2
29	W	December 9, 1986	7–2	@ New York Islanders (1986–87)	13–14–2
30	L	December 10, 1986	4–5	@ New York Rangers (1986–87)	13–15–2
31	L	December 13, 1986	3–6	Calgary Flames (1986–87)	13–16–2
32	L	December 14, 1986	2–4	Edmonton Oilers (1986–87)	13–17–2
33	W	December 17, 1986	3–0	Pittsburgh Penguins (1986–87)	14–17–2
34	T	December 20, 1986	8–8 OT	@ Edmonton Oilers (1986–87)	14–17–3
35	W	December 22, 1986	5–3	@ Calgary Flames (1986–87)	15–17–3
36	L	December 23, 1986	4–6	@ Vancouver Canucks (1986–87)	15–18–3
37	W	December 27, 1986	2–1 OT	Boston Bruins (1986–87)	16–18–3
38	W	December 30, 1986	4–1	Philadelphia Flyers (1986–87)	17–18–3

January

Game	Result	Date	Score	Opponent	Record
39	T	January 2, 1987	3–3 OT	@ Vancouver Canucks (1986–87)	17–18–4
40	L	January 3, 1987	1–8	Edmonton Oilers (1986–87)	17–19–4
41	W	January 7, 1987	6–1	@ Edmonton Oilers (1986–87)	18–19–4
42	L	January 8, 1987	4–5	@ Calgary Flames (1986–87)	18–20–4
43	L	January 10, 1987	5–8	Buffalo Sabres (1986–87)	18–21–4
44	W	January 14, 1987	4–0	Vancouver Canucks (1986–87)	19–21–4
45	W	January 16, 1987	5–3	@ St. Louis Blues (1986–87)	20–21–4
46	T	January 17, 1987	4–4 OT	@ St. Louis Blues (1986–87)	20–21–5
47	T	January 19, 1987	2–2 OT	New York Rangers (1986–87)	20–21–6
48	W	January 21, 1987	10–5	Pittsburgh Penguins (1986–87)	21–21–6
49	L	January 23, 1987	3–6	Minnesota North Stars (1986–87)	21–22–6
50	W	January 28, 1987	6–2	New Jersey Devils (1986–87)	22–22–6
51	L	January 31, 1987	3–5	@ Montreal Canadiens (1986–87)	22–23–6

February

Game	Result	Date	Score	Opponent	Record
52	L	February 1, 1987	2–3	@ Quebec Nordiques (1986–87)	22–24–6
53	L	February 4, 1987	4–5	@ Toronto Maple Leafs (1986–87)	22–25–6
54	L	February 6, 1987	1–6	@ Winnipeg Jets (1986–87)	22–26–6
55	L	February 8, 1987	1–3	@ Winnipeg Jets (1986–87)	22–27–6
56	W	February 14, 1987	5–2	Hartford Whalers (1986–87)	23–27–6
57	T	February 16, 1987	1–1 OT	Toronto Maple Leafs (1986–87)	23–27–7
58	W	February 18, 1987	7–4	Washington Capitals (1986–87)	24–27–7
59	L	February 21, 1987	2–4	Philadelphia Flyers (1986–87)	24–28–7
60	W	February 24, 1987	8–3	Winnipeg Jets (1986–87)	25–28–7
61	L	February 26, 1987	3–4	Winnipeg Jets (1986–87)	25–29–7
62	L	February 28, 1987	3–6	@ Minnesota North Stars (1986–87)	25–30–7

March

Game	Result	Date	Score	Opponent	Record
63	L	March 1, 1987	1–6	@ Chicago Blackhawks (1986–87)	25–31–7
64	T	March 3, 1987	4–4 OT	Minnesota North Stars (1986–87)	25–31–8
65	L	March 5, 1987	2–7	@ Calgary Flames (1986–87)	25–32–8
66	L	March 6, 1987	3–9	@ Edmonton Oilers (1986–87)	25–33–8
67	W	March 8, 1987	5–2	Vancouver Canucks (1986–87)	26–33–8
68	L	March 11, 1987	2–3	Buffalo Sabres (1986–87)	26–34–8
69	L	March 14, 1987	3–6	Quebec Nordiques (1986–87)	26–35–8
70	W	March 17, 1987	5–4	@ Washington Capitals (1986–87)	27–35–8
71	W	March 19, 1987	5–2	@ Philadelphia Flyers (1986–87)	28–35–8
72	L	March 21, 1987	6–8	@ Boston Bruins (1986–87)	28–36–8
73	L	March 22, 1987	3–6	@ Hartford Whalers (1986–87)	28–37–8
74	W	March 25, 1987	6–1	@ Detroit Red Wings (1986–87)	29–37–8
75	W	March 26, 1987	5–3	@ Buffalo Sabres (1986–87)	30–37–8
76	L	March 28, 1987	3–4	Calgary Flames (1986–87)	30–38–8
77	W	March 30, 1987	5–4	Calgary Flames (1986–87)	31–38–8

April

Game	Result	Date	Score	Opponent	Record
78	L	April 1, 1987	3–8	Vancouver Canucks (1986–87)	31–39–8
79	L	April 4, 1987	3–7	Edmonton Oilers (1986–87)	31–40–8
80	L	April 5, 1987	2–5	@ Vancouver Canucks (1986–87)	31–41–8

Legend: Win (2 points) Loss (0 points) Tie (1 point)

== Player statistics ==
Regular season
Scoring

Player	Pos	GP	G	A	Pts	PIM	+/-	PPG	SHG	GWG
Luc Robitaille	LW	79	45	39	84	28	-18	18	0	3
Bernie Nicholls	C	80	33	48	81	101	-16	10	1	2
Jimmy Carson	C	80	37	42	79	22	-5	18	0	2
Marcel Dionne	C	67	24	50	74	54	-8	9	0	2
Dave Taylor	RW	67	18	44	62	84	0	9	1	3
Jim Fox	RW	76	19	42	61	48	-10	4	0	2
Bryan Erickson	RW	68	20	30	50	26	-12	6	2	4
Steve Duchesne	D	75	13	25	38	74	8	5	0	2
Grant Ledyard	D	67	14	23	37	93	-40	5	0	1
Jay Wells	D	77	7	29	36	155	-19	6	0	2
Morris Lukowich	LW	60	14	21	35	64	0	4	0	2
Tiger Williams	LW	76	16	18	34	358	-1	1	0	3
Sean McKenna	RW	69	14	19	33	10	11	0	1	0
Mark Hardy	D	73	3	27	30	120	16	0	0	0
Bob Bourne	C	78	13	9	22	35	-13	0	3	0
Phil Sykes	LW	58	6	15	21	133	10	0	1	0
Dean Kennedy	D	66	6	14	20	91	9	0	0	1
Garry Galley	D	30	5	11	16	57	-9	2	0	1
Larry Playfair	D	37	2	7	9	181	-1	0	0	0
Craig Redmond	D	16	1	7	8	8	-1	0	0	0
Paul Guay	RW	35	2	5	7	16	-14	0	0	0
Roland Melanson	G	46	0	6	6	22	0	0	0	0
Bobby Carpenter	C	10	2	3	5	6	-8	0	0	0
Dave Langevin	D	11	0	4	4	7	-3	0	0	0
Joe Paterson	LW	45	2	1	3	158	-15	0	0	1
Tom Laidlaw	D	11	0	3	3	4	1	0	0	0
Lyle Phair	LW	5	2	0	2	2	-1	0	0	0
Peter Dineen	D	11	0	2	2	8	-9	0	0	0
Ken Hammond	D	10	0	2	2	11	2	0	0	0
Darren Eliot	G	24	0	1	1	18	0	0	0	0
Al Jensen	G	5	0	1	1	0	0	0	0	0
Craig Duncanson	LW	2	0	0	0	24	0	0	0	0
Bob Janecyk	G	7	0	0	0	2	0	0	0	0
Brian Wilks	C	1	0	0	0	0	-2	0	0	0

Goaltending

Player	MIN	GP	W	L	T	GA	GAA	SO	SA	SV	SV%
Roland Melanson	2734	46	18	21	6	168	3.69	1	1420	1252	.882
Darren Eliot	1404	24	8	13	2	103	4.40	1	692	589	.851
Bob Janecyk	420	7	4	3	0	34	4.86	0	222	188	.847
Al Jensen	300	5	1	4	0	27	5.40	0	154	127	.825
Team:	4858	80	31	41	8	332	4.10	2	2488	2156	.867

Playoffs
Scoring

Player	Pos	GP	G	A	Pts	PIM	+/-	PPG	SHG	GWG
Bernie Nicholls	C	5	2	5	7	6	1	1	0	0
Jim Fox	RW	5	3	2	5	0	-2	1	0	0
Tiger Williams	LW	5	3	2	5	30	2	0	0	1
Dave Taylor	RW	5	2	3	5	6	-2	1	0	0
Luc Robitaille	LW	5	1	4	5	2	-7	0	0	0
Steve Duchesne	D	5	2	2	4	4	-8	1	0	0
Bob Bourne	C	5	2	1	3	0	-2	0	0	0
Bobby Carpenter	C	5	1	2	3	2	-4	0	0	0
Jimmy Carson	C	5	1	2	3	6	-6	0	0	0
Mark Hardy	D	5	1	2	3	10	3	0	0	0
Jay Wells	D	5	1	2	3	10	-3	1	0	0
Bryan Erickson	RW	3	1	1	2	0	0	0	0	0
Dean Kennedy	D	5	0	2	2	10	1	0	0	0
Sean McKenna	RW	5	0	1	1	0	-4	0	0	0
Phil Sykes	LW	5	0	1	1	8	-2	0	0	0
Darren Eliot	G	1	0	0	0	0	0	0	0	0
Paul Guay	RW	2	0	0	0	0	1	0	0	0
Tom Laidlaw	D	5	0	0	0	2	-9	0	0	0
Grant Ledyard	D	5	0	0	0	10	-2	0	0	0
Morris Lukowich	LW	3	0	0	0	8	1	0	0	0
Roland Melanson	G	5	0	0	0	4	0	0	0	0
Joe Paterson	LW	2	0	0	0	0	-2	0	0	0

Goaltending

Player	MIN	GP	W	L	GA	GAA	SO	SA	SV	SV%
Roland Melanson	260	5	1	4	24	5.54	0	154	130	.844
Darren Eliot	40	1	0	0	7	10.50	0	29	22	.759
Team:	300	5	1	4	31	6.20	0	183	152	.831

Note:

Pos = Position;GP = Games played; G = Goals; A = Assists; Pts = Points; PIM = Penalty minutes; +/- = Plus/minus; PPG = Power-play goals; SHG = Short-handed goals; GWG = Game-winning goals
Pos = Position;GP = Games played; Min, TOI = Minutes played; W = Wins; L = Losses; T,T/OT = Ties; OTL = Overtime losses; GA = Goals-against; GAA = Goals-against average; SO = Shutouts; SA = Shots against; SV = Shots saved;SV% = Save percentage;

== Transactions ==
The Kings were involved in the following transactions during the 1986–87 season.

=== Trades ===
February 14, 1987	To Los Angeles Kings Al Jensen	To Washington Capitals Garry Galley
March 10, 1987	To Los Angeles Kings Bobby Carpenter; Tom Laidlaw	To New York Rangers Marcel Dionne; Jeff Crossman; 3rd round pick in 1989 – Murray Garbutt

=== Free agent signings ===
July 1, 1986	From Saint-Jean Castors (QMJHL) Eric Germain
July 30, 1986	From Philadelphia Flyers Peter Dineen
February 4, 1987	From Minnesota North Stars Dave Langevin

=== Free agents lost ===
July 1, 1986	To EHC Kloten (NL) Bob Mongrain

=== Waivers ===
October 6, 1986	From New York Islanders Bob Bourne
October 6, 1986	From Buffalo Sabres Mal Davis

== Draft picks ==
Los Angeles's draft picks at the 1986 NHL entry draft held at the Montreal Forum in Montreal. The Kings attempted to select Grant Paranica in the second round of the 1986 NHL supplemental draft, but the pick was ruled invalid since Paranica entered school after age 20 and therefore did not meet eligibility requirements.

Round	#	Player	Nationality	College/Junior/Club team (League)
1	2	Jimmy Carson	United States	Verdun Junior Canadiens (QMJHL)
3	44	Denis Larocque	Canada	Guelph Platers (OHL)
4	65	Sylvain Couturier	Canada	Laval Titan (QMJHL)
5	86	Dave Guden	United States	Roxbury Latin School (ISL)
6	107	Robb Stauber	United States	Duluth Denfeld High School (USHS-MN)
7	128	Sean Krakiwsky	Canada	Calgary Wranglers (WHL)
8	149	Rene Chapdelaine	Canada	Lake Superior State University (CCHA)
9	170	Trevor Pochipinski	Canada	Penticton Knights (BCJHL)
10	191	Paul Kelly	Canada	Guelph Platers (OHL)
11	212	Russ Mann	United States	St. Lawrence University (ECAC)
12	233	Brian Hayton	Canada	Guelph Platers (OHL)
S1	1	Bob Kudelski	United States	Yale University (ECAC)

== See also ==
- 1986–87 NHL season
