= Ted Fauss =

American ice hockey player (born 1961)

- Born: June 30, 1961 (age 64) Clark Mills, New York
- Height: 188 cm (6 ft 2 in)
- Weight: 93 kg (205 lb; 14 st 9 lb)
- Position: Defense
- Shot: Right
- Played for: Toronto Maple Leafs
- NHL draft: Undrafted
- Playing career: 1983–1995

Theodore William Fauss (born June 30, 1961 in Clark Mills, New York) is an American former professional ice hockey defenseman. He played in the National Hockey League (NHL) for the Toronto Maple Leafs.

== Career statistics ==
			Regular season					Playoffs
Season	Team	League	GP	G	A	Pts	PIM	GP	G	A	Pts	PIM
1979–80	Ottawa 67's	OMJHL	—	—	—	—	—	1	0	0	0	0
1979–80	Clarkson University	NCAA	34	2	4	6	36	—	—	—	—	—
1980–81	Clarkson University	NCAA	37	0	5	5	56	—	—	—	—	—
1981–82	Clarkson University	NCAA	35	3	6	9	79	—	—	—	—	—
1982–83	Clarkson University	NCAA	25	4	6	10	60	—	—	—	—	—
1982–83	Nova Scotia Voyageurs	AHL	5	0	1	1	11	7	0	1	1	6
1983–84	Nova Scotia Voyageurs	AHL	71	4	11	15	123	7	0	2	2	28
1984–85	Sherbrooke Canadiens	AHL	77	1	9	10	62	17	2	2	4	27
1986–87	Newmarket Saints	AHL	59	0	5	5	81	—	—	—	—	—
1986–87	Toronto Maple Leafs	NHL	15	0	1	1	11	—	—	—	—	—
1987–88	Newmarket Saints	AHL	49	0	11	11	86	—	—	—	—	—
1987–88	Toronto Maple Leafs	NHL	13	0	1	1	4	—	—	—	—	—
1988–89	Binghamton Whalers	AHL	53	4	11	15	66	—	—	—	—	—
1993–94	Utica Bulldogs	CoHL	20	3	4	7	48	—	—	—	—	—
1994–95	Utica Blizzard	CoHL	5	1	1	2	8	—	—	—	—	—
NHL totals			28	0	2	2	15	—	—	—	—	—
AHL totals			314	9	48	57	429	31	2	5	7	61
