= Mitch Wilson =

Canadian ice hockey player (1962–2019)

- Born: February 15, 1962 Kelowna, British Columbia, Canada
- Died: May 18, 2019 (aged 57) Brinnon, Washington, U.S.
- Height: 5 ft 8 in (173 cm)
- Weight: 190 lb (86 kg; 13 st 8 lb)
- Position: Centre
- Shot: Right
- Played for: New Jersey Devils; Pittsburgh Penguins
- NHL draft: Undrafted
- Playing career: 1982–1992

John Mitchell Wilson (February 15, 1962 – May 18, 2019) was a Canadian ice hockey centre. Wilson played 26 games in the National Hockey League (NHL) for the New Jersey Devils and Pittsburgh Penguins from 1984 to 1987. He made his NHL debut on October 12, 1984. In August 2014, he was diagnosed with Amyotrophic lateral sclerosis, and he died from the disease in 2019.

== Career statistics ==
=== Regular season and playoffs ===
			Regular season					Playoffs
Season A	Team	League	GP	G	A	Pts	PIM	GP	G	A	Pts	PIM
1978–79	Kelowna Buckaroos	BCJHL	62	7	13	20	156	—	—	—	—	—
1979–80	Kelowna Buckaroos	BCJHL	55	17	22	39	223	—	—	—	—	—
1980–81	Seattle Breakers	WHL	64	8	23	31	253	5	3	0	3	31
1981–82	Seattle Breakers	WHL	60	18	17	35	436	10	3	7	10	55
1982–83	Wichita Wind	CHL	55	4	6	10	186	—	—	—	—	—
1983–84	Maine Mariners	AHL	71	6	8	14	349	17	3	6	9	98
1984–85	New Jersey Devils	NHL	9	0	2	2	21	—	—	—	—	—
1984–85	Maine Mariners	AHL	51	6	3	9	220	2	0	0	0	32
1985–86	Maine Mariners	AHL	64	4	3	7	217	3	0	0	0	2
1986–87	Pittsburgh Penguins	NHL	17	2	1	3	83	—	—	—	—	—
1986–87	Baltimore Skipjacks	AHL	58	8	9	17	353	—	—	—	—	—
1987–88	Muskegon Lumberjacks	IHL	68	27	25	52	400	5	1	0	1	23
1988–89	Muskegon Lumberjacks	IHL	61	16	34	50	382	11	4	5	9	83
1989–90	Muskegon Lumberjacks	IHL	63	13	24	37	283	15	1	4	5	97
1990–91	Muskegon Lumberjacks	IHL	78	14	19	33	387	4	1	2	3	34
1991–92	San Diego Gulls	IHL	12	0	0	0	55	—	—	—	—	—
1991–92	Louisville Icehawks	ECHL	25	9	11	20	144	—	—	—	—	—
AHL totals			244	24	23	47	1139	22	3	6	9	132
IHL totals			282	70	102	172	1507	35	7	11	18	237
NHL totals			26	2	3	5	104	—	—	—	—	—
