= 1986–87 Calgary Flames season =

NHL team season

1986–87 Calgary Flames
- Division: 2nd Smythe
- Conference: 2nd Campbell
- 1986–87 record: 46–31–3
- Home record: 25–13–2
- Road record: 21–18–1
- Goals for: 318
- Goals against: 289

Team information
- General manager: Cliff Fletcher
- Coach: Bob Johnson
- Captain: Lanny McDonald, Jim Peplinski and Doug Risebrough
- Alternate captains: Vacant
- Arena: Olympic Saddledome
- Average attendance: 16,798

Team leaders
- Goals: Joe Mullen (47)
- Assists: Al MacInnis (56)
- Points: Joe Mullen (87)
- Penalty minutes: Tim Hunter (361)
- Wins: Mike Vernon (30)
- Goals against average: Rejean Lemelin (3.25)

The 1986–87 Calgary Flames season was the seventh National Hockey League season in Calgary and 15th for the Flames franchise. The Flames posted their best record in franchise history to that time, as Calgary's 95 points was the third best total in the league. The Flames' defence of their 1986 Campbell Conference championship was quickly snuffed out by the Winnipeg Jets, as the Flames were upset in the first round of the playoffs in six games by their Manitoba rivals.

Joe Mullen captured his first Lady Byng Memorial Trophy for gentlemanly conduct, while Al MacInnis was named a Second Team All-star. The Flames had no player representatives at Rendez-vous '87, which replaced the All-Star Game for this season, though head coach Bob Johnson served as an assistant coach for the NHL all-stars.

Tragedy struck the Flames in the summer of 1986, as their first round draft pick, George Pelawa, died in an automobile crash over the Labour Day weekend. Pelawa's death is commonly rumoured to be an inspiration for the 1988 Tom Cochrane song "Big League", but this is untrue.

Following the season, the Flames released a music video to benefit charity. The "Red Hot" video featured many players, including Lanny McDonald, Gary Roberts, Mike Vernon, Al MacInnis and Joel Otto, among others, lipsynching and pretending to play instruments. It was released on VHS and on vinyl. It enjoyed popularity then but was forgotten until the video surfaced on the internet in 2005.

== Regular season ==
=== Season standings ===
Smythe Division
	GP	W	L	T	GF	GA	Pts
**Edmonton Oilers**	80	50	24	6	372	284	106
**Calgary Flames**	80	46	31	3	318	289	95
**Winnipeg Jets**	80	40	32	8	279	271	88
**Los Angeles Kings**	80	31	41	8	318	341	70
Vancouver Canucks	80	29	43	8	282	314	66

Note: GP = Games played, W = Wins, L = Losses, T = Ties, Pts = Points, GF = Goals for, GA = Goals against
Note: Teams that qualified for the playoffs are highlighted in bold.

=== Record vs. opponents ===
Smythe Division record vs. opponents

==== Vs. Campbell Conference ====
**Vs. Smythe Division**

1986–87 NHL records
Team	**CGY**	**EDM**	**LAK**	**VAN**	**WIN**	**Total**
Calgary	—	6–1–1	5–3	4–4	2–6	**17–14–1**
Edmonton	1–6–1	—	4–2–2	7–0–1	5–3	**17–11–4**
Los Angeles	3–5	2–4–2	—	2–5–1	3–5	**10–19–3**
Vancouver	4–4	0–7–1	5–2–1	—	3–5	**12–18–2**
Winnipeg	6–2	3–5	5–3	5–3	—	**19–13–0**

**Vs. Norris Division**

1986–87 NHL records
Team	**CHI**	**DET**	**MIN**	**STL**	**TOR**	**Total**
Calgary	3–0	1–2	1–1–1	1–2	2–1	**8–6–1**
Edmonton	1–2	3–0	2–0–1	3–0	2–1	**11–3–1**
Los Angeles	1–1–1	3–0	0–2–1	1–1–1	1–1–1	**6–5–4**
Vancouver	1–1–1	1–2	0–3	2–0–1	2–1	**6–7–2**
Winnipeg	0–3	1–1–1	2–1	1–0–2	1–2	**5–7–3**

**Vs. Wales Conference**

**Vs. Adams Division**

1986–87 NHL records
Team	**BOS**	**BUF**	**HFD**	**MTL**	**QUE**	**Total**
Calgary	1–2	3–0	2–1	1–2	2–1	**9–6–0**
Edmonton	1–2	2–1	2–1	3–0	3–0	**11–4–0**
Los Angeles	1–2	1–2	2–1	0–3	0–3	**4–11–0**
Vancouver	1–2	3–0	0–2–1	2–1	1–2	**7–7–1**
Winnipeg	1–2	2–1	1–1–1	1–2	1–0–2	**6–6–3**

**Vs. Patrick Division**

1986–87 NHL records
Team	**NJD**	**NYI**	**NYR**	**PHI**	**PIT**	**WSH**	**Total**
Calgary	2–1	2–0–1	2–1	2–1	2–1	2–1	**12–5–1**
Edmonton	2–1	2–0–1	3–0	1–2	2–1	1–2	**11–6–1**
Los Angeles	2–1	2–1	0–2–1	2–1	2–1	3–0	**11–6–1**
Vancouver	0–2–1	2–1	1–2	1–2	0–1–2	0–3	**4–11–3**
Winnipeg	3–0	1–1–1	2–1	1–2	2–1	1–1–1	**10–6–2**

== Schedule and results ==
1986–87 regular season
October: 3–7–0 (home: 1–3–0; road: 2–4–0)

#	Date	Visitor	Score	Home	OT	Record	Points
1	October 9	Calgary	5 – 3	Boston		1–0–0	2
2	October 11	Calgary	5 – 6	Hartford		1–1–0	2
3	October 12	Calgary	4 – 2	Buffalo		2–1–0	4
4	October 16	Quebec	4 – 2	Calgary		2–2–0	4
5	October 18	Detroit	5 – 3	Calgary		2–3–0	4
6	October 22	Edmonton	3 – 6	Calgary		3–3–0	6
7	October 24	Calgary	2 – 5	Winnipeg		3–4–0	6
8	October 26	Boston	6 – 0	Calgary		3–5–0	6
9	October 28	Calgary	4 – 7	Minnesota		3–6–0	6
10	October 29	Calgary	2 – 6	Winnipeg		3–7–0	6

November: 10–3–0 (home: 9–2–0; road: 1–1–0)

#	Date	Visitor	Score	Home	OT	Record	Points
11	November 1	Washington	1 – 4	Calgary		4–7–0	8
12	November 3	Los Angeles	2 – 4	Calgary		5–7–0	10
13	November 5	Calgary	3 – 1	Edmonton		6–7–0	12
14	November 7	Edmonton	4 – 6	Calgary		7–7–0	14
15	November 9	Montreal	0 – 3	Calgary		8–7–0	16
16	November 11	Vancouver	3 – 5	Calgary		9–7–0	18
17	November 13	Hartford	3 – 4	Calgary		10–7–0	20
18	November 15	Calgary	1 – 4	Los Angeles		10–8–0	20
19	November 18	Calgary	0 – 5	Vancouver		10–9–0	20
20	November 20	Pittsburgh	5 – 2	Calgary		10–10–0	20
21	November 22	NY Rangers	5 – 8	Calgary		11–10–0	22
22	November 24	Edmonton	5 – 6	Calgary		12–10–0	24
23	November 27	Winnipeg	4 – 3	Calgary		12–11–0	24
24	November 29	Chicago	4 – 5	Calgary		13–11–0	26

December: 9–4–1 (home: 3–1–1; road: 6–3–0)

#	Date	Visitor	Score	Home	OT	Record	Points
25	December 2	NY Islanders	3 – 3	Calgary		13–11–1	27
26	December 4	Chicago	1 – 4	Calgary		14–11–1	29
27	December 6	Calgary	3 – 2	Quebec		15–11–1	31
28	December 8	Calgary	3 – 5	Montreal		15–12–1	31
29	December 10	Calgary	6 – 4	Pittsburgh		16–12–1	33
30	December 11	Calgary	3 – 5	Philadelphia		16–13–1	33
31	December 13	Calgary	6 – 3	Los Angeles		17–13–1	35
32	December 16	Detroit	3 – 8	Calgary		18–13–1	37
33	December 18	Quebec	2 – 6	Calgary		19–13–1	39
34	December 20	Calgary	5 – 3	Vancouver		20–13–1	41
35	December 22	Los Angeles	5 – 3	Calgary		20–14–1	41
36	December 28	Calgary	4 – 1	Buffalo		21–14–1	43
37	December 30	Calgary	4 – 3	New Jersey		22–14–1	45
38	December 31	Calgary	4 – 6	Detroit		22–15–1	45

January:6–7–1 (home: 3–2–1; road: 3–5–0)

#	Date	Visitor	Score	Home	OT	Record	Points
39	January 3	Calgary	4 – 7	St. Louis		22–16–1	45
40	January 4	Calgary	4 – 1	Chicago		23–16–1	47
41	January 8	Los Angeles	4 – 5	Calgary		24–16–1	49
42	January 10	St. Louis	2 – 5	Calgary		25–16–1	51
43	January 11	Calgary	3 – 5	Edmonton		25–17–1	51
44	January 14	NY Rangers	8 – 5	Calgary		25–18–1	51
45	January 16	Calgary	5 – 9	Vancouver		25–19–1	51
46	January 17	Vancouver	4 – 3	Calgary		25–20–1	51
47	January 20	Calgary	3 – 1	NY Islanders		26–20–1	53
48	January 22	Calgary	5 – 7	New Jersey		26–21–1	53
49	January 24	Calgary	3 – 5	Boston		26–22–1	53
50	January 26	Calgary	6 – 5	Toronto	OT	27–22–1	55
51	January 29	Minnesota	3 – 3	Calgary	OT	27–22–2	56
52	January 31	New Jersey	3 – 5	Calgary		28–22–2	58

February: 9–3–0 (home: 5–3–0; road: 4–0–0)

#	Date	Visitor	Score	Home	OT	Record	Points
53	February 3	Vancouver	4 – 2	Calgary		28–23–2	58
54	February 5	St. Louis	2 – 1	Calgary		28–24–2	58
55	February 7	NY Islanders	1 – 4	Calgary		29–24–2	60
56	February 8	Calgary	3 – 2	Vancouver		30–24–2	62
57	February 14	Calgary	3 – 2	Minnesota		31–24–2	64
58	February 16	Calgary	5 – 0	Philadelphia		32–24–2	66
59	February 17	Calgary	3 – 1	Pittsburgh		33–24–2	68
60	February 20	Toronto	2 – 7	Calgary		34–24–2	70
61	February 22	Washington	5 – 2	Calgary		34–25–2	70
62	February 24	Vancouver	0 – 2	Calgary		35–25–2	72
63	February 26	Philadelphia	3 – 4	Calgary		36–25–2	74
64	February 28	Winnipeg	3 – 5	Calgary		37–25–2	76

March: 9–5–0 (home: 4–1–0; road: 5–4–0)

#	Date	Visitor	Score	Home	OT	Record	Points
65	March 1	Calgary	3 – 6	Winnipeg		37–26–2	76
66	March 3	Montreal	4 – 2	Calgary		37–27–2	76
67	March 5	Los Angeles	2 – 7	Calgary		38–27–2	78
68	March 8	Calgary	7 – 4	NY Rangers		39–27–2	80
69	March 10	Calgary	6 – 3	Washington		40–27–2	82
70	March 11	Calgary	6 – 1	Hartford		41–27–2	84
71	March 14	Calgary	4 – 6	Toronto		41–28–2	84
72	March 17	Buffalo	2 – 6	Calgary		42–28–2	86
73	March 19	Edmonton	4 – 5	Calgary		43–28–2	88
74	March 20	Calgary	6 – 3	Edmonton		44–28–2	90
75	March 25	Calgary	1 – 10	Winnipeg		44–29–2	90
76	March 26	Winnipeg	1 – 3	Calgary		45–29–2	92
77	March 28	Calgary	4 – 3	Los Angeles		46–29–2	94
78	March 30	Calgary	4 – 5	Los Angeles		46–30–2	94

April: 0–1–1 (home: 0–1–0; road: 0–0–1)

#	Date	Visitor	Score	Home	OT	Record	Points
79	April 2	Calgary	4 – 4	Edmonton	OT	46–30–3	95
80	April 5	Winnipeg	3 – 1	Calgary		46–31–3	95

Legend: Win (2 points) Loss (0 points) Tie (1 point)

== Playoffs ==
1987 Stanley Cup playoffs
Smythe Division Semifinal vs. Winnipeg – Jets win 4–2

#	Date	Visitor	Score	Home	OT	Series
1	April 8	Winnipeg	4 – 2	Calgary		Winnipeg leads 1–0
2	April 9	Winnipeg	3 – 2	Calgary		Winnipeg leads 2–0
3	April 11	Calgary	3 – 2	Winnipeg	OT	Winnipeg leads 2–1
4	April 12	Calgary	3 – 4	Winnipeg		Winnipeg leads 3–1
5	April 14	Winnipeg	3 – 4	Calgary		Winnipeg leads 3–2
6	April 16	Calgary	1 – 6	Winnipeg		Winnipeg wins 4–2

Legend: Win Loss

== Player statistics ==
=== Skaters ===
Note: GP = Games played; G = Goals; A = Assists; Pts = Points; PIM = Penalty minutes

		Regular season					Playoffs
Player	#	GP	G	A	Pts	PIM	GP	G	A	Pts	PIM
Joe Mullen	7	79	47	40	87	14	6	2	1	3	0
Al MacInnis	2	79	20	56	76	97	4	1	0	1	0
Paul Reinhart	26	76	15	53	68	22	4	0	1	1	6
Carey Wilson	33	80	20	36	56	42	6	1	1	2	6
Mike Bullard^{†}	25	57	28	26	54	34	6	4	3	7	2
John Tonelli	27	78	20	31	51	72	3	0	0	0	2
Joel Otto	29	68	19	31	50	185	2	0	2	2	6
Jim Peplinski	24	80	18	32	50	181	6	1	0	1	24
Gary Suter	20	68	9	40	49	70	6	0	3	3	10
Håkan Loob	12	68	18	26	44	26	5	1	2	3	0
Jamie Macoun	6	79	7	33	40	111	3	0	1	1	8
Steve Bozek	26	71	17	18	35	22	4	1	0	1	2
Brian Bradley	14	40	10	18	28	16	–	–	–	–	–
Lanny McDonald	9	58	14	12	26	54	5	0	0	0	2
Colin Patterson	11	68	13	13	26	54	6	0	2	2	2
Tim Hunter	19	73	6	15	21	361	–	–	–	–	–
Gary Roberts	32/10	32	5	10	15	85	2	0	0	0	4
Dale DeGray	28	27	6	7	13	29	–	–	–	–	–
Neil Sheehy	5	54	4	6	10	151	6	0	0	0	21
Dan Quinn^{‡}	10	16	3	6	9	14	–	–	–	–	–
Perry Berezan	21	24	5	3	8	24	2	0	2	2	7
Nick Fotiu	22	42	5	3	8	145	–	–	–	–	–
Kari Eloranta	32	13	1	6	7	9	6	0	2	2	0
Joe Nieuwendyk	18	9	5	1	6	0	6	0	2	2	0
Doug Risebrough	8	22	2	3	5	66	4	0	1	1	23
Kevan Guy	3	24	0	4	4	19	4	0	1	1	23
Brian Engblom	6	32	0	4	4	28	–	–	–	–	–
Paul Baxter	4	18	0	2	2	66	2	0	0	0	10
Mike Vernon	30	54	0	2	2	14	5	0	0	0	0
Brett Hull	16	5	1	0	1	0	4	2	1	3	0
Doug Dadswell	36	2	0	0	0	0	–	–	–	–	–
Rejean Lemelin	1	34	0	0	0	20	2	0	1	1	0

^{†}Denotes player spent time with another team before joining Calgary. Stats reflect time with the Flames only.
^{‡}Traded mid-season.

=== Goaltenders ===
Note: GP = Games played; TOI = Time on ice (minutes); W = Wins; L = Losses; OT = Overtime/shootout losses; GA = Goals against; SO = Shutouts; GAA = Goals against average

		Regular season								Playoffs
Player	#	GP	TOI	W	L	T	GA	SO	GAA	GP	TOI	W	L	GA	SO	GAA
Rejean Lemelin	31	34	1735	16	9	1	94	1	3.15	2	101	0	1	6	0	3.56
Mike Vernon	30	54	2957	30	21	1	178	1	3.61	5	263	2	3	16	0	3.65
Doug Dadswell	36	2	125	0	1	1	10	0	4.80

== Transactions ==
The Flames were involved in the following transactions during the 1986–87 season.

=== Trades ===
October 3, 1986	To Calgary Flames Jim Korn	To Toronto Maple Leafs Terry Johnson
October 3, 1986	To Calgary Flames Brian Engblom	To Buffalo Sabres Jim Korn
October 7, 1986	To Calgary Flames Mark Paterson	To Hartford Whalers Yves Courteau
November 12, 1986	To Calgary Flames Mike Bullard	To Pittsburgh Penguins Dan Quinn

=== Free agents ===
Player	Former team
G Doug Dadswell	Cornell University (NCAA)
C Marc Bureau	Longueuil Chevaliers (QMJHL)

Player	New team
D Robin Bartell	Vancouver Canucks
C Mark Lamb	Detroit Red Wings

== Draft picks ==
Calgary's picks at the 1986 NHL entry draft, held in Montreal.

Rnd	Pick	Player	Nationality	Position	Team (league)	NHL statistics				
Rnd	Pick	Player	Nationality	Position	Team (league)	GP	G	A	Pts	PIM
1	16	George Pelawa	United States	F	Bemidji (USHS)					
2	37	Brian Glynn	Canada	D	Saskatoon Blades (WHL)	431	25	79	104	410
4	79	Tom Quinlan	United States	RW	N/A					
5	100	Scott Bloom	United States	LW	N/A					
6	121	John Parker	United States	C	N/A					
7	142	Rick Lessard	Canada	D	Ottawa 67's (OHL)	15	0	4	4	18
8	163	Mark Olsen	United States	D	N/A					
9	184	Scott Sharples	Canada	G	Penticton Knights (BCJHL)	1	0–0–1, 3.69GAA			
10	205	Doug Pickel	Canada	LW	Kamloops Blazers (WHL)					
11	226	Anders Lindstrom	Sweden	C	N/A					
12	247	Antonin Stavjana	Czechoslovakia	D	N/A					
S2	19	Steve MacSwain	United States	RW	N/A					

== See also ==
- 1986–87 NHL season
