= Jim Korn =

American ice hockey player (born 1957)

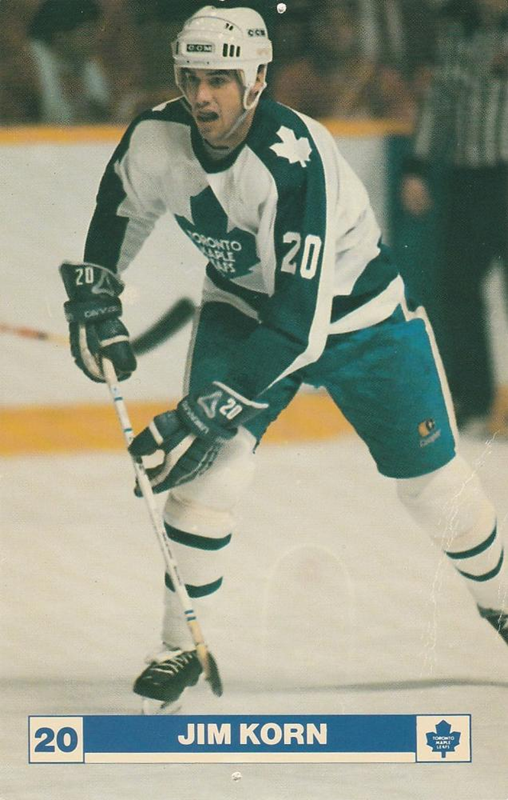
- Korn in 1985 postcard
- Born: July 28, 1957 (age 68) Hopkins, Minnesota, U.S.
- Height: 6 ft 4 in (193 cm)
- Weight: 220 lb (100 kg; 15 st 10 lb)
- Position: Defense/Left wing
- Shot: Left
- Played for: Detroit Red Wings; Toronto Maple Leafs; Buffalo Sabres; New Jersey Devils; Calgary Flames
- National team: United States
- NHL draft: 73rd overall, 1977; Detroit Red Wings
- WHA draft: 52nd overall, 1977; New England Whalers
- Playing career: 1979–1990

James Allen Korn (born July 28, 1957) is an American former professional ice hockey defenceman. He played in the National Hockey League with five teams between 1979 and 1990. Internationally he played for the American national team at two World Championships.

== Life and career ==
Korn moved to Minnetonka, Minnesota, at the age of 6 months with his family, where he grew up and attended Hopkins High School.

He was drafted in the fifth round, 73rd overall, by the Detroit Red Wings in the 1977 NHL Amateur Draft. He played for the Providence College Friars for four seasons, from 1975 to 1979, where he was a second team All American in his senior season. He played in the National Hockey League with the Red Wings, Toronto Maple Leafs, Buffalo Sabres, New Jersey Devils and Calgary Flames.

Korn was also drafted by the New England Whalers of the World Hockey Association, but he never played in that league.

In his NHL career, Korn appeared in 597 games. He scored 66 goals and added 122 assists. He also recorded 1,801 penalty minutes.

== Career statistics ==
=== Regular season and playoffs ===
			Regular season					Playoffs
Season	Team	League	GP	G	A	Pts	PIM	GP	G	A	Pts	PIM
1975–76	Providence College	ECAC	20	2	0	2	10	—	—	—	—	—
1976–77	Providence College	ECAC	29	6	9	15	73	—	—	—	—	—
1977–78	Providence College	ECAC	33	7	14	21	47	—	—	—	—	—
1978–79	Providence College	ECAC	27	5	19	24	72	—	—	—	—	—
1979–80	Detroit Red Wings	NHL	63	5	13	18	108	—	—	—	—	—
1979–80	Adirondack Red Wings	AHL	14	2	7	9	40	—	—	—	—	—
1980–81	Detroit Red Wings	NHL	63	5	15	20	246	—	—	—	—	—
1980–81	Adirondack Red Wings	AHL	9	3	7	10	53	—	—	—	—	—
1981–82	Detroit Red Wings	NHL	59	1	7	8	104	—	—	—	—	—
1981–82	Toronto Maple Leafs	NHL	11	1	3	4	44	—	—	—	—	—
1982–83	Toronto Maple Leafs	NHL	80	8	21	29	236	3	0	0	0	26
1983–84	Toronto Maple Leafs	NHL	65	12	14	26	257	—	—	—	—	—
1984–85	Toronto Maple Leafs	NHL	41	5	5	10	171	—	—	—	—	—
1986–87	Buffalo Sabres	NHL	52	4	10	14	158	—	—	—	—	—
1987–88	New Jersey Devils	NHL	52	8	13	21	140	9	0	2	2	71
1988–89	New Jersey Devils	NHL	65	15	16	31	212	—	—	—	—	—
1989–90	New Jersey Devils	NHL	37	2	3	5	99	—	—	—	—	—
1989–90	Calgary Flames	NHL	9	0	2	2	26	4	1	0	1	12
NHL totals			597	66	122	188	1801	16	1	2	3	109

=== International ===
Year	Team	Event	GP	G	A	Pts	PIM
1979	United States	WC	8	0	1	1	8
1981	United States	WC	5	0	1	1	6
Senior totals			13	0	2	2	14

== Awards and honors ==
Award	Year
All-ECAC Hockey Second Team	1978–79
