= Mike Bullard (ice hockey) =

Canadian ice hockey player (born 1961)

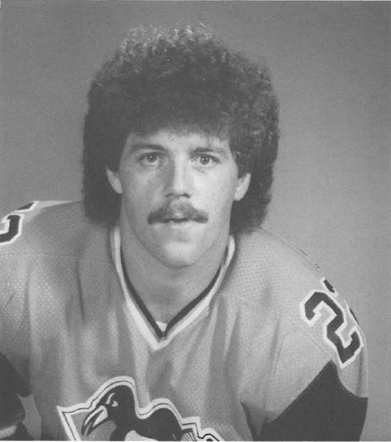
- Born: March 10, 1961 (age 65) Ottawa, Ontario, Canada
- Height: 6 ft 0 in (183 cm)
- Weight: 195 lb (88 kg; 13 st 13 lb)
- Position: Centre
- Shot: Left
- Played for: Pittsburgh Penguins; Calgary Flames; St. Louis Blues; Philadelphia Flyers; Toronto Maple Leafs; EV Landshut; Eisbären Berlin; SERC Wild Wings
- National team: Canada
- NHL draft: 9th overall, 1980; Pittsburgh Penguins
- Playing career: 1980–2003

Michael Brian Bullard (born March 10, 1961) is a Canadian former professional ice hockey centre who played 11 seasons in the National Hockey League (NHL) between 1980–81 and 1991–92.

== Playing career ==
As a youth, Bullard played in the 1974 Quebec International Pee-Wee Hockey Tournament with a minor ice hockey team from East Ottawa.

Bullard was drafted 9th overall by the Pittsburgh Penguins in the 1980 NHL entry draft. In his NHL career he played for the Penguins, Calgary Flames, St. Louis Blues, Philadelphia Flyers, and the Toronto Maple Leafs. He played in Switzerland in 1990 for one season for the HC Ambrì-Piotta in the NDA before moving to the Leafs and then spent ten seasons in Germany before calling time on his playing career in 2003. Playing for EV Landshut he was the Bundesliga's top scorer and player of the year for 1993–94.

Starting in 2003 Bullard coached the 2nd Bundesliga club SERC Wild Wings, later switching to Austrian club Graz 99ers, before he decided to return to Germany to coach ESV Kaufbeuren. After these stations he returned to his longtime employer, the Landshut Cannibals, to coach the team for the 2008–09 season.

For the 2009–2010 season, he became the general manager of the Brantford Eagles and the following season, he became the team's coach as well. As of 2018, Bullard is the head coach of the Caledonia Corvairs of the GOJHL.

== Career statistics ==
=== Regular season and playoffs ===
			Regular season					Playoffs
Season	Team	League	GP	G	A	Pts	PIM	GP	G	A	Pts	PIM
1977–78	East Ottawa Voyageurs	Midget	90	89	114	203		—	—	—	—	—
1978–79	Brantford Alexanders	OMJHL	66	43	56	99	66	—	—	—	—	—
1979–80	Brantford Alexanders	OMJHL	66	66	84	150	86	11	10	6	16	29
1980–81	Brantford Alexanders	OHL	42	47	60	107	55	6	4	5	9	10
1980–81	Pittsburgh Penguins	NHL	15	1	2	3	19	4	3	3	6	0
1981–82	Pittsburgh Penguins	NHL	75	36	27	63	91	5	1	1	2	4
1982–83	Pittsburgh Penguins	NHL	57	22	22	44	60	—	—	—	—	—
1983–84	Pittsburgh Penguins	NHL	76	51	41	92	57	—	—	—	—	—
1984–85	Pittsburgh Penguins	NHL	68	32	31	63	75	—	—	—	—	—
1985–86	Pittsburgh Penguins	NHL	77	41	42	83	69	—	—	—	—	—
1986–87	Pittsburgh Penguins	NHL	14	2	10	12	17	—	—	—	—	—
1986–87	Calgary Flames	NHL	57	28	26	54	34	6	4	2	6	2
1987–88	Calgary Flames	NHL	79	48	55	103	68	6	0	2	2	6
1988–89	St. Louis Blues	NHL	20	4	12	16	46	—	—	—	—	—
1988–89	Philadelphia Flyers	NHL	54	23	26	49	60	19	3	9	12	32
1989–90	Philadelphia Flyers	NHL	70	27	37	64	67	—	—	—	—	—
1990–91	HC Ambrì–Piotta	NDA	41	41	37	78	33	5	6	4	10	6
1991–92	Toronto Maple Leafs	NHL	65	14	14	28	42	—	—	—	—	—
1992–93	SC Rapperswil–Jona	SUI.2	36	48	34	82	40	7	6	7	13	4
1993–94	EV Landshut	1.GBun	44	36	27	63	40	7	3	1	4	10
1994–95	EV Landshut	DEL	38	22	43	65	83	18	17	10	27	28
1995–96	EV Landshut	DEL	50	29	41	70	56	11	6	11	17	20
1996–97	EV Landshut	DEL	47	19	51	70	69	7	6	4	10	40
1997–98	EV Landshut	DEL	40	7	21	28	55	6	5	5	10	8
1998–99	Eisbären Berlin	DEL	50	21	30	51	58	8	1	4	5	6
1999–2000	Eisbären Berlin	DEL	54	21	25	46	71	—	—	—	—	—
2000–01	SERC Wild Wings	DEL	44	20	20	40	32	—	—	—	—	—
2001–02	SERC Wild Wings	DEL	48	19	14	33	32	—	—	—	—	—
2002–03	SERC Wild Wings	DEL	10	5	5	10	6	—	—	—	—	—
2002–03	Heilbronner EC	DEU.2	28	7	13	20	39	—	—	—	—	—
NHL totals			727	329	345	674	705	40	11	17	28	44
DEL totals			381	163	250	413	466	50	35	34	69	102

=== International ===
Year	Team	Event	GP	G	A	Pts	PIM
1986	Canada	WC	10	2	1	3	2
Senior totals			10	2	1	3	2

== See also ==
- List of NHL players with 100-point seasons

Preceded by Blair Chapman	Pittsburgh Penguins first-round draft pick 1980	Succeeded by Rich Sutter
Preceded by Randy Carlyle	Pittsburgh Penguins captain 1984–86	Succeeded by Terry Ruskowski
