= 1986–87 New York Rangers season =

NHL hockey team season

1986–87 New York Rangers
- Division: 4th Patrick
- Conference: 7th Wales
- 1986–87 record: 34–38–8
- Home record: 18–18–4
- Road record: 16–20–4
- Goals for: 307
- Goals against: 323

Team information
- General manager: Phil Esposito
- Coach: Ted Sator; Tom Webster; Phil Esposito
- Captain: Ron Greschner
- Arena: Madison Square Garden

Team leaders
- Goals: Walt Poddubny/Tomas Sandstrom (40)
- Assists: Walt Poddubny (47)
- Points: Walt Poddubny (87)
- Penalty minutes: Larry Melnyk (182)
- Wins: John Vanbiesbrouck (18)
- Goals against average: John Vanbiesbrouck (3.64)

The 1986–87 New York Rangers season was the franchise's 61st season. During the regular season, the Rangers finished in fourth place in the Patrick Division with 76 points, which allowed them to qualify for the NHL playoffs. However, New York was eliminated in the first round of the playoffs by the Philadelphia Flyers.

== Regular season ==
=== Final standings ===
Patrick Division
	GP	W	L	T	GF	GA	Pts
**Philadelphia Flyers**	80	46	26	8	310	245	100
**Washington Capitals**	80	38	32	10	285	278	86
**New York Islanders**	80	35	33	12	279	281	82
**New York Rangers**	80	34	38	8	307	323	76
Pittsburgh Penguins	80	30	38	12	297	290	72
New Jersey Devils	80	29	45	6	293	368	64

Note: GP = Games played, W = Wins, L = Losses, T = Ties, Pts = Points, GF = Goals for, GA = Goals against
Note: Teams that qualified for the playoffs are highlighted in bold.

=== Record vs. opponents ===
Patrick Division record vs. opponents

==== Vs. Wales Conference ====
**Vs. Patrick Division**

1986–87 NHL records
Team	**NJD**	**NYI**	**NYR**	**PHI**	**PIT**	**WSH**	**Total**
New Jersey	—	2–5	4–3	2–4–1	4–3	1–6	13–21–1
N.Y. Islanders	5–2	—	3–3–1	3–4	5–0–2	2–3–2	18–12–2
N.Y. Rangers	3–4	3–3–1	—	4–3	3–2–2	4–3	17–15–3
Philadelphia	4–2–1	4–3	3–4	—	4–1–2	5–1–1	20–11–4
Pittsburgh	3–4	0–5–2	2–3–2	1–4–2	—	4–3	10–19–6
Washington	6–1	3–2–2	3–4	1–5–1	3–4	—	16–16–3

**Vs. Adams Division**

1986–87 NHL records
Team	**BOS**	**BUF**	**HFD**	**MTL**	**QUE**	**Total**
New Jersey	1–1–1	1–2	1–1–1	1–2	0–1–2	4–7–4
N.Y. Islanders	0–2–1	1–1–1	1–2	1–1–1	2–1	5–7–3
N.Y. Rangers	2–1	2–1	0–3	0–2–1	2–1	6–8–1
Philadelphia	2–1	2–1	1–2	2–0–1	2–0–1	9–4–2
Pittsburgh	1–2	2–0–1	0–3	1–1–1	3–0	7–6–2
Washington	1–1–1	1–2	1–2	3–0	0–2–1	6–7–2

==== Vs. Campbell Conference ====
**Vs. Norris Division**

1986–87 NHL records
Team	**CHI**	**DET**	**MIN**	**STL**	**TOR**	**Total**
New Jersey	1–2	2–1	1–2	2–1	1–2	7–8–0
N.Y. Islanders	1–2	2–1	3–0	1–1–1	2–1	9–5–1
N.Y. Rangers	1–1–1	1–2	1–1–1	1–2	1–1–1	5–7–3
Philadelphia	2–0–1	2–1	1–2	3–0	1–1–1	9–4–2
Pittsburgh	2–1	1–2	3–0	1–0–2	1–2	8–5–2
Washington	1–1–1	2–0–1	2–0–1	2–0–1	2–1	9–2–4

**Vs. Smythe Division**

1986–87 NHL records
Team	**CGY**	**EDM**	**LAK**	**VAN**	**WIN**	**Total**
New Jersey	1–2	1–2	1–2	2–0–1	0–3	5–9–1
N.Y. Islanders	0–2–1	0–2–1	1–2	1–2	1–1–1	3–9–2
N.Y. Rangers	1–2	0–3	2–0–1	2–1	1–2	6–8–1
Philadelphia	1–2	2–1	1–2	2–1	2–1	8–7–0
Pittsburgh	1–2	1–2	1–2	1–0–2	1–2	5–8–2
Washington	1–2	2–1	0–3	3–0	1–1–1	7–7–1

== Schedule and results ==
1986–87 regular season
October: 2–4–4 (home: 1–2–2; road: 1–2–2)

Game	October	Opponent	Score	Record
1	9	New Jersey Devils	5–3	0–1–0
2	11	@ Pittsburgh Penguins	6–5 OT	0–2–0
3	13	Washington Capitals	7–6 OT	0–3–0
4	15	@ Chicago Blackhawks	5–5 OT	0–3–1
5	18	@ New York Islanders	3–2	1–3–1
6	19	New York Islanders	2–2 OT	1–3–2
7	22	Los Angeles Kings	5–4 OT	2–3–2
8	25	@ Montreal Canadiens	3–3 OT	2–3–3
9	26	Toronto Maple Leafs	3–3 OT	2–3–4
10	29	@ St. Louis Blues	7–2	2–4–4

November: 5–7–2 (home: 3–2–1; road: 2–5–1)

Game	November	Opponent	Score	Record
11	2	Winnipeg Jets	5–4 OT	2–5–4
12	5	@ Detroit Red Wings	5–4 OT	2–6–4
13	8	@ Philadelphia Flyers	3–2	3–6–4
14	9	@ Quebec Nordiques	6–5	3–7–4
15	12	Buffalo Sabres	2–1 OT	4–7–4
16	14	Philadelphia Flyers	2–1	5–7–4
17	16	Edmonton Oilers	8–6	5–8–4
18	17	@ New Jersey Devils	3–2	5–9–4
19	19	@ Edmonton Oilers	5–4 OT	5–10–4
20	21	@ Vancouver Canucks	8–5	6–10–4
21	22	@ Calgary Flames	8–5	6–11–4
22	26	Quebec Nordiques	4–2	7–11–4
23	29	@ Pittsburgh Penguins	5–5 OT	7–11–5
24	30	Pittsburgh Penguins	2–2 OT	7–11–6

December: 8–6–0 (home: 4–2–0; road: 4–4–0)

Game	December	Opponent	Score	Record
25	2	@ New Jersey Devils	8–5	7–12–6
26	5	@ Winnipeg Jets	6–3	8–12–6
27	10	Los Angeles Kings	5–4	9–12–6
28	11	@ Montreal Canadiens	6–2	9–13–6
29	14	@ Washington Capitals	3–1	10–13–6
30	15	Minnesota North Stars	4–3	10–14–6
31	17	Washington Capitals	6–1	11–14–6
32	20	@ New York Islanders	5–2	11–15–6
33	21	Hartford Whalers	4–3 OT	11–16–6
34	23	New Jersey Devils	8–5	12–16–6
35	26	@ New Jersey Devils	7–4	13–16–6
36	27	@ St. Louis Blues	3–2	13–17–6
37	30	@ Pittsburgh Penguins	5–3	14–17–6
38	31	New York Islanders	4–3 OT	15–17–6

January: 5–6–2 (home: 2–3–1; road: 3–3–1)

Game	January	Opponent	Score	Record
39	3	@ Quebec Nordiques	5–2	16–17–6
40	5	Minnesota North Stars	3–3 OT	16–17–7
41	7	Philadelphia Flyers	6–3	16–18–7
42	9	New York Islanders	2–1	16–19–7
43	11	Vancouver Canucks	8–3	17–19–7
44	12	@ Boston Bruins	4–1	17–20–7
45	14	@ Calgary Flames	8–5	18–20–7
46	19	@ Los Angeles Kings	2–2 OT	18–20–8
47	21	@ Vancouver Canucks	5–3	18–21–8
48	23	@ Edmonton Oilers	7–4	18–22–8
49	26	New Jersey Devils	6–3	19–22–8
50	28	Winnipeg Jets	2–1	19–23–8
51	31	@ Philadelphia Flyers	3–1	20–23–8

February: 7–5–0 (home: 4–3–0; road: 3–2–0)

Game	February	Opponent	Score	Record
52	1	Boston Bruins	5–4	21–23–8
53	4	Washington Capitals	3–2	22–23–8
54	7	@ Washington Capitals	5–4 OT	23–23–8
55	8	Toronto Maple Leafs	5–4	23–24–8
56	15	Pittsburgh Penguins	4–1	24–24–8
57	17	Detroit Red Wings	6–2	25–24–8
58	19	@ Chicago Blackhawks	5–2	25–25–8
59	20	Buffalo Sabres	6–3	25–26–8
60	22	Pittsburgh Penguins	4–2	25–27–8
61	24	@ Buffalo Sabres	6–3	26–27–8
62	25	@ Toronto Maple Leafs	4–2	27–27–8
63	28	@ Detroit Red Wings	4–1	27–28–8

March: 7–7–0 (home: 4–4–0; road: 3–3–0)

Game	March	Opponent	Score	Record
64	1	@ Washington Capitals	7–3	27–29–8
65	4	New York Islanders	7–5	28–29–8
66	8	Calgary Flames	7–4	28–30–8
67	11	Boston Bruins	3–2	29–30–8
68	12	@ Philadelphia Flyers	6–1	30–30–8
69	14	@ Pittsburgh Penguins	3–2 OT	31–30–8
70	15	Philadelphia Flyers	5–2	31–31–8
71	17	@ Philadelphia Flyers	4–1	31–32–8
72	18	Hartford Whalers	5–3	31–33–8
73	21	@ New York Islanders	4–3	31–34–8
74	22	Chicago Blackhawks	5–3	32–34–8
75	25	New Jersey Devils	8–2	32–35–8
76	27	St. Louis Blues	6–4	33–35–8
77	30	@ Minnesota North Stars	6–5	34–35–8

April: 0–3–0 (home: 0–2–0; road: 0–1–0)

Game	April	Opponent	Score	Record
78	1	Washington Capitals	5–1	34–36–8
79	4	@ Hartford Whalers	5–3	34–37–8
80	5	Montreal Canadiens	8–2	34–38–8

Legend: Win (2 points) Loss (0 points) Tie (1 point)

== Playoffs ==
1987 Stanley Cup playoffs
Division semifinals vs. (P1) Philadelphia Flyers – Philadelphia wins 4–2

Game	Date	Visitor	Score	Home	OT	Series
1	April 8	New York Rangers	3–0	Philadelphia Flyers		New York Rangers lead series 1–0
2	April 9	New York Rangers	3–8	Philadelphia Flyers		Series tied 1–1
3	April 11	Philadelphia Flyers	3–0	New York Rangers		Philadelphia leads series 2–1
4	April 12	Philadelphia Flyers	3–6	New York Rangers		Series tied 2–2
5	April 14	New York Rangers	1–3	Philadelphia Flyers		Philadelphia leads series 3–2
6	April 16	Philadelphia Flyers	5–0	New York Rangers		Philadelphia wins series 4–2

Legend: Win Loss

== Player statistics ==
Skaters

Regular season
Player	GP	G	A	Pts	+/-	PIM
Walt Poddubny	75	40	47	87	16	49
Tomas Sandstrom	64	40	34	74	8	60
Kelly Kisio	70	24	40	64	−5	73
Pierre Larouche	73	28	35	63	−7	12
Don Maloney	72	19	38	57	7	117
James Patrick	78	10	45	55	13	62
Tony McKegney^{†}	64	29	17	46	−1	56
Ron Greschner	61	6	34	40	−6	62
Mike Ridley^{‡}	38	16	20	36	−10	20
Mark Osborne^{‡}	58	17	15	32	−15	101
Willie Huber	66	8	22	30	−13	68
Jan Erixon	68	8	18	26	3	24
Ron Duguay^{†}	34	9	12	21	−8	9
Kelly Miller^{‡}	38	6	14	20	−5	22
Curt Giles^{†}	61	2	17	19	3	50
Larry Melnyk	73	3	12	15	−13	182
Terry Carkner	52	2	13	15	−1	118
Chris Jensen	37	6	7	13	−1	21
Lucien DeBlois	40	3	8	11	−7	27
Tom Laidlaw^{‡}	63	1	10	11	−18	65
Marcel Dionne^{†}	14	4	6	10	−8	6
Bobby Carpenter^{†‡}	28	2	8	10	−12	20
George McPhee	21	4	4	8	−2	34
Bob Brooke^{‡}	15	3	5	8	−3	20
Kjell Samuelsson^{‡}	30	2	6	8	−2	50
Jeff Jackson^{†}	9	5	1	6	−3	15
Raimo Helminen^{‡}	21	2	4	6	−8	2
Dave Gagner	10	1	4	5	−1	12
Lane Lambert^{‡}	18	2	2	4	2	33
Brad Maxwell^{†‡}	9	0	4	4	−1	6
Jay Caufield	13	2	1	3	−2	45
Mike Donnelly	5	1	1	2	0	0
Pat Price^{†}	13	0	2	2	−8	49
Gordie Walker	1	1	0	1	2	4
Don Jackson	22	1	0	1	−1	91
Norm Maciver	3	0	1	1	−5	0
Jim Leavins	4	0	1	1	0	4
Mike Siltala	1	0	0	0	1	0
Bob Crawford^{‡}	3	0	0	0	−1	2
Stu Kulak^{†}	3	0	0	0	−1	0
Ron Talakoski	3	0	0	0	1	21
Paul Fenton	8	0	0	0	−5	2

Playoffs
Player	GP	G	A	Pts	PIM
Ron Greschner	6	0	5	5	0
Pierre Larouche	6	3	2	5	4
James Patrick	6	1	2	3	2
Don Maloney	6	2	1	3	6
Tomas Sandstrom	6	1	2	3	20
Jeff Jackson	6	1	1	2	16
Marcel Dionne	6	1	1	2	2
Ron Duguay	6	2	0	2	4
Willie Huber	6	0	2	2	6
Pat Price	6	0	1	1	27
George McPhee	6	1	0	1	28
Jan Erixon	6	1	0	1	0
Kelly Kisio	4	0	1	1	2
Stu Kulak	3	0	0	0	2
Jay Caufield	3	0	0	0	12
Lucien DeBlois	2	0	0	0	2
Terry Carkner	1	0	0	0	0
Larry Melnyk	6	0	0	0	4
Curt Giles	5	0	0	0	6
Tony McKegney	6	0	0	0	12
Walt Poddubny	6	0	0	0	8

Goaltenders

Regular season
Player	GP	TOI	W	L	T	GA	GAA	SA	SV%	SO
John Vanbiesbrouck	50	2656	18	20	5	161	3.64	1363	.882	0
Bob Froese^{†}	28	1474	14	11	0	92	3.74	783	.883	0
Doug Soetaert	13	675	2	7	2	58	5.16	367	.842	0
Ron Scott	1	65	0	0	1	5	4.62	35	.857	0

Playoffs
Player	GP	TOI	W	L	GA	GAA	SA	SV%	SO
John Vanbiesbrouck	4	195	1	3	11	3.38	110	.900	1
Bob Froese	4	165	1	1	10	3.64	96	.896	0

^{†}Denotes player spent time with another team before joining Rangers. Stats reflect time with Rangers only.
^{‡}Traded mid-season. Stats reflect time with Rangers only.

Note:

Pos = Position;GP = Games played; G = Goals; A = Assists; Pts = Points; PIM = Penalty minutes; +/- = Plus/minus; PPG = Power-play goals; SHG = Short-handed goals; GWG = Game-winning goals
Pos = Position;GP = Games played; Min, TOI = Minutes played; W = Wins; L = Losses; T,T/OT = Ties; OTL = Overtime losses; GA = Goals-against; GAA = Goals-against average; SO = Shutouts; SA = Shots against; SV = Shots saved;SV% = Save percentage;

== Draft picks ==
New York's picks at the 1986 NHL entry draft in Montreal, Canada at the Montreal Forum.

Round	#	Player	Position	Nationality	College/Junior/Club team (League)
1	9	Brian Leetch	D	United States	Avon Old Farms (Connecticut)
3	51	Bret Walter	C	Canada	University of Alberta (CIAU)
3	53	Shaun Clouston	C	Canada	University of Alberta (CIAU)
4	72	Mark Janssens	C	Canada	Regina Pats (WHL)
5	93	Jeff Bloemberg	D	Canada	North Bay Centennials (OHL)
6	114	Darren Turcotte	C	United States	North Bay Centennials (OHL)
7	135	Rob Graham	RW	United States	Guelph Platers (OHL)
8	156	Barry Chyzowski	C	Canada	St. Albert Saints (AJHL)
9	177	Pat Scanlon	LW	United States	Cretin Derham Hall H.S. (Minnesota)
10	198	Joe Ranger	D	Canada	London Knights (OHL)
11	219	Russ Parent	D	Canada	South Winnipeg Blues (MJHL)
12	240	Soren True	LW	Denmark	Skobakken (Denmark)

=== Supplemental Draft ===
New York's picks at the 1986 NHL supplemental draft.

Round	#	Player	Position	Nationality	College/Junior/Club team (League)
2	12	Gary Emmons	C	Canada	Northern Michigan University (CCHA)
