= 1986–87 Hartford Whalers season =

National Hockey League team season

1986–87 Hartford Whalers
- Adams Division champions
- Division: 1st Adams
- Conference: 2nd Wales
- 1986–87 record: 43–30–7
- Home record: 26–9–5
- Road record: 17–21–2
- Goals for: 287
- Goals against: 270

Team information
- General manager: Emile Francis
- Coach: Jack Evans
- Captain: Ron Francis
- Alternate captains: Dave Tippett; Joel Quenneville
- Arena: Hartford Civic Center
- Average attendance: 14,230 (94.1%)
- Minor league affiliates: Binghamton Whalers (AHL); Salt Lake Golden Eagles (IHL)

Team leaders
- Goals: Kevin Dineen (40)
- Assists: Ron Francis (63)
- Points: Ron Francis (93)
- Penalty minutes: Paul MacDermid (202)
- Plus/minus: Ulf Samuelsson (+29)
- Wins: Mike Liut (31)
- Goals against average: Mike Liut (3.23)

The 1986–87 Hartford Whalers season saw the Whalers finish in first place in the Adams Division with a record of 43 wins, 30 losses, and 7 ties for 93 points. They lost the Adams Division semifinals in six games to the Quebec Nordiques. This was the only time in franchise history that the Whalers finished above fourth place in their division before their relocation to North Carolina.

== Offseason ==
At the 1986 NHL entry draft held at the Montreal Forum on June 21, the Whalers selected Scott Young from Boston University of Hockey East. In 38 games with Boston University, Young scored 16 goals and 29 points during the 1985–86 season.

On July 10, Hartford signed free agent Dallas Gaume, who had played with the University of Denver of the WCHA for the past four seasons. Gaume scored 37 goals and 99 points in 47 games during the 1985–86 season, as he was named to the All-WCHA First Team.

On October 3, the Whalers signed free agent Greg Britz, who was previously in the Toronto Maple Leafs organization. During the 1985–86 season, Britz scored 17 goals and 36 points in 72 games with the St. Catharines Saints of the AHL. Britz had appeared in seven NHL games with Toronto between 1983 and 1985, earning no points.

At the NHL Waiver Draft on October 6, the Whalers selected Gord Sherven from the Edmonton Oilers. Sherven split the 1985–86 season between the Oilers and the Minnesota North Stars, as he scored a goal and four points in 18 games. In 49 AHL games split between the Springfield Indians and Nova Scotia Oilers, Sherven scored 17 goals and 41 points.

The Whalers and Calgary Flames were involved in a trade on October 7, as the Whalers acquired Yves Courteau from the Flames in exchange for Mark Paterson. In four games with Calgary during the 1985–86 season, Courteau scored a goal and two points. He spent most of the season with the Flames AHL affiliate, the Moncton Golden Flames, as he scored 19 goals and 40 points in 59 games.

== Regular season ==
=== Final standings ===
Adams Division
| | GP | W | L | T | GF | GA | Pts |
|---|---|---|---|---|---|---|---|
| **Hartford Whalers** | 80 | 43 | 30 | 7 | 287 | 270 | 93 |
| **Montreal Canadiens** | 80 | 41 | 29 | 10 | 277 | 241 | 92 |
| **Boston Bruins** | 80 | 39 | 34 | 7 | 301 | 276 | 85 |
| **Quebec Nordiques** | 80 | 31 | 39 | 10 | 267 | 276 | 72 |
| Buffalo Sabres | 80 | 28 | 44 | 8 | 280 | 308 | 64 |

Note: GP = Games played, W = Wins, L = Losses, T = Ties, Pts = Points, GF = Goals for, GA = Goals against
Note: Teams that qualified for the playoffs are highlighted in bold.

=== Record vs. opponents ===
Adams Division record vs. opponents

==== Vs. Wales Conference ====
**Vs. Adams Division**

1986–87 NHL records
| Team | **BOS** | **BUF** | **HFD** | **MTL** | **QUE** | **Total** |
|---|---|---|---|---|---|---|
| Boston | — | 3–4–1 | 2–6 | 2–5–1 | 6–2 | **13–17–2** |
| Buffalo | 4–3–1 | — | 4–4 | 1–5–2 | 3–4–1 | **12–16–4** |
| Hartford | 6–2 | 4–4 | — | 4–3–1 | 3–3–2 | **17–12–3** |
| Montreal | 5–2–1 | 5–1–2 | 3–4−1 | — | 5–3 | **18–10–4** |
| Quebec | 2–6 | 4–3–1 | 3–3–2 | 3–5 | — | **12–17–3** |

**Vs. Patrick Division**

1986–87 NHL records
| Team | **NJD** | **NYI** | **NYR** | **PHI** | **PIT** | **WSH** | **Total** |
|---|---|---|---|---|---|---|---|
| Boston | 1–1–1 | 2–0–1 | 1–2 | 1–2 | 2–1 | 1–1–1 | **8–7–3** |
| Buffalo | 2–1 | 1–1–1 | 1–2 | 1–2 | 0–2–1 | 2–1 | **7–9–2** |
| Hartford | 1–1–1 | 2–1 | 3–0 | 2–1 | 3–0 | 2–1 | **13–4–1** |
| Montreal | 2–1 | 1–1–1 | 2–0–1 | 0–2–1 | 1–1–1 | 0–3 | **6–8–4** |
| Quebec | 1–0–2 | 1–2 | 1–2 | 0–2–1 | 0–3 | 2–0–1 | **5–9–4** |

==== Vs. Campbell Conference ====
**Vs. Norris Division**

1986–87 NHL records
| Team | **CHI** | **DET** | **MIN** | **STL** | **TOR** | **Total** |
|---|---|---|---|---|---|---|
| Boston | 1–1–1 | 0–2–1 | 3–0 | 2–1 | 2–1 | **8–5–2** |
| Buffalo | 2–1 | 2–0–1 | 0–3 | 1–2 | 0–2–1 | **5–8–2** |
| Hartford | 1–2 | 1–1–1 | 1–2 | 2–1 | 2–1 | **7–7–1** |
| Montreal | 2–0–1 | 1–1–1 | 2–1 | 2–1 | 2–1 | **9–4–2** |
| Quebec | 2–1 | 1–2 | 2–0–1 | 0–3 | 3–0 | **8–6–1** |

**Vs. Smythe Division**

1986–87 NHL records
| Team | **CGY** | **EDM** | **LAK** | **VAN** | **WIN** | **Total** |
|---|---|---|---|---|---|---|
| Boston | 2–1 | 2–1 | 2–1 | 2–1 | 2–1 | **10–5–0** |
| Buffalo | 0–3 | 1–2 | 2–1 | 0–3 | 1–2 | **4–11–0** |
| Hartford | 1–2 | 1–2 | 1–2 | 2–0–1 | 1–1–1 | **6–7–2** |
| Montreal | 2–1 | 0–3 | 3–0 | 1–2 | 2–1 | **8–7–0** |
| Quebec | 1–2 | 0–3 | 3–0 | 2–1 | 0–1–2 | **6–7–2** |

== Playoffs ==
=== Adams Division Semifinals ===
The Whalers opened the 1987 Stanley Cup playoffs against the Quebec Nordiques in a best-of-seven series. Quebec finished the regular season with a 31-39-10 record, earning 72 points, which was 21 fewer points than the Whalers, and the fourth and final playoff position in the Adams Division. The Whalers and Nordiques faced off against each other in the 1986 Stanley Cup playoffs, as the fourth place Whalers swept the first place Nordiques in the first round.

The series opened on April 8 at the Hartford Civic Center. Quebec scored the lone goal of the first period, as Peter Stastny beat Whalers goaltender Mike Liut as Quebec took a 1–0 lead. The Nordiques extended their lead to 2–0 after a goal by Robert Picard at 6:32, however, just under three minutes later, the Whalers John Anderson scored on the power play, cutting the Nordiques lead to 2–1 after two periods. In the third period, the Whalers Dean Evason scored 8:48 into the period, tying the game 2-2. The game would go into overtime, as neither team could score again. In the extra period, Hartford's Paul MacDermid scored 2:20 into the period, as the Whalers completed the comeback and defeated the Nordiques 3–2 to take a 1–0 series lead.

The series resumed the next evening in Hartford, however, it would be the Nordiques once again opening the scoring, as Randy Moller scored 3:35 into the game to give Quebec a 1–0 lead. The Whalers responded with a goal by Sylvain Turgeon, tying the game 1-1, however, the Nordiques Jeff Brown scored a power play goal late in the period, giving Quebec a 2–1 lead into the first intermission. The Whalers tied the game midway through the second period on a goal by Stew Gavin at 10:26 into the period, then a goal 89 seconds later by Scot Kleinendorst gave the Whalers their first lead of the game at 3–2. Late in the period, the Whalers Paul MacDermid beat Nordiques goaltender Clint Malarchuk, extending the Whalers lead to 4–2 after the second period. In the third period, Hartford's Dana Murzyn scored 6:58 into the period on the power play, as the Whalers took a 5–2 lead. The Nordiques fought back with goals by John Ogrodnick and Lane Lambert, however, Hartford hung on for the 5–4 victory and took a 2–0 series lead.

The third game of the series was played on April 11 at Le Colisée in Quebec City. Peter Stastny of the Nordiques opened the scoring with a shorthanded goal only 1:20 into the period, giving the Nordiques a 1–0 lead. Just over six minutes later, Šťastný scored his second goal of the game, extending Quebec's lead to 2–0. The Nordiques scored again, as Michel Goulet scored on the power play, as Quebec took a 3–0 lead into the first intermission. The Nordiques continued their dominance in the second period, as Goulet scored his second of the game 3:34 into the period, giving Quebec a 4–0 lead, as Whalers goaltender Mike Liut was pulled from the game, being replaced by Steve Weeks. Just under three minutes later, the Nordiques scored again, as Peter Stastny scored his third goal of the game, as Quebec took a commanding 5–0 lead. The Whalers managed to shut Quebec down for the remainder of the game, however, they would only get an early third period goal by Ron Francis, as Quebec won game three by a score of 5–1, cutting the Whalers series lead to 2–1.

Game four of the series was played the next evening in Quebec. The Nordiques once again opened the scoring, as Jeff Brown put the puck past Mike Liut, giving Quebec a 1–0 lead at the 4:53 mark. The Whalers Dana Murzyn tied the game at 10:25 of the first period, however, the Nordiques responded with a late power play goal by Michel Goulet, as Quebec took a 2–1 lead after the first period. In the second period, the Nordiques Michel Goulet scored the lone goal, his second of the game, extending Quebec's lead to 3–1 after two periods. Goulet would record the hat trick with a power play goal at 9:44 in the third period, as Quebec defeated the Whalers 4–1 to even the series at two games each.

The fifth game of the series was back in Hartford on April 14. For the fifth time of the series, Quebec opened the scoring, as Robert Picard scored on the power play 7:17 into the first period. The Whalers tied it just under two and a half minutes later on a goal by Ron Francis, then Hartford took a 2–1 lead on a power play goal by Mike McEwen at 13:38 into the period. The Nordiques tied the game on a power play goal by Jeff Brown at the 15:10 mark of the period, however, the Whalers re-took the lead with a late period goal by Ray Ferraro, as Hartford had a 3–2 lead after the first period. In the second period, the Nordiques John Ogrodnick scored the lone goal, as he connected on the power play, tying the game 3-3. In the third period, the Whalers Ray Ferraro and Kevin Dineen each took a two-minute penalty 2:27 into the third, giving Quebec a five-on-three advantage. The Nordiques took advantage, as John Ogrodnick and Michel Goulet each scored on the power play, giving the Nordiques a 5–3 lead. The Whalers fought back, as Dean Evason scored at 7:32, cutting the Nordiques lead to 5–4. Stew Gavin then tied the game with a goal at 11:19, making it 5-5. Hartford's comeback attempt was then stopped, as the Nordiques John Ogrodnick scored with 1:07 left in the game, giving Quebec a 6–5 lead. The Nordiques Mike Eagles then scored an empty net goal, as Quebec won the game 7–5, and took a 3–2 series lead.

Game six was back in Quebec, played on April 16, as the Whalers faced elimination. Hartford opened the scoring for the first time in the series, as Dean Evason scored a goal 1:06 into the game for the 1–0 lead. Quebec tied the game with a goal just over two minutes later by Lane Lambert. At 6:43, the Whalers took the lead once again, as Dave Babych scored on the power play, giving the Whalers a 2–1 lead. Kevin Dineen then added a goal at 13:32, as Hartford took a 3–1 lead after the first period. In the second period, Dineen scored his second goal of the game, 6:24 into the period on the power play, extending the Whalers lead to 4–1. Quebec's Peter Stastny replied with a power play goal of his own at 13:47, cutting the Whalers lead to 4–2. Just thirty seconds later, the Nordiques John Ogrodnick scored, as Hartford clung on to a 4–3 lead after two periods. In the third period, after a holding penalty to the Whalers Dave Babych, the Nordiques tied the game on a power play goal by Jason Lafreniere, making the score 4-4. Neither team could break the tie, as the game went into overtime. In the extra period, the Nordiques completed the comeback and the upset, as Peter Stastny scored his second goal of the game at 6:08 into the period, giving Quebec the 5–4 victory and winning the series 4–2, eliminating the Whalers from the post-season.

== Schedule and results ==
=== Regular season ===
1986–87 regular season
October: 4–3–1 (home: 3–1–1; road: 1–2–0)

| Game | Date | Score | Opponent | Record | Recap |
|---|---|---|---|---|---|
| 1 | October 11, 1986 | 6–5 | Calgary Flames | 1–0–0 | W |
| 2 | October 12, 1986 | 2–7 | @ Boston Bruins | 1–1–0 | L |
| 3 | October 16, 1986 | 4–4 OT | Winnipeg Jets | 1–1–1 | T |
| 4 | October 18, 1986 | 3–6 | Philadelphia Flyers | 1–2–1 | L |
| 5 | October 24, 1986 | 5–4 | @ Buffalo Sabres | 2–2–1 | W |
| 6 | October 25, 1986 | 3–2 | Buffalo Sabres | 3–2–1 | W |
| 7 | October 28, 1986 | 5–2 | Pittsburgh Penguins | 4–2–1 | W |
| 8 | October 30, 1986 | 2–6 | @ Toronto Maple Leafs | 4–3–1 | L |

November: 7–3–2 (home: 4–1–1; road: 3–2–1)

| Game | Date | Score | Opponent | Record | Recap |
|---|---|---|---|---|---|
| 9 | November 1, 1986 | 2–2 OT | Quebec Nordiques | 4–3–2 | T |
| 10 | November 2, 1986 | 3–3 OT | @ Quebec Nordiques | 4–3–3 | T |
| 11 | November 5, 1986 | 3–2 | New York Islanders | 5–3–3 | W |
| 12 | November 8, 1986 | 3–4 | @ Los Angeles Kings | 5–4–3 | L |
| 13 | November 12, 1986 | 4–3 | @ Vancouver Canucks | 6–4–3 | W |
| 14 | November 13, 1986 | 3–4 | @ Calgary Flames | 6–5–3 | L |
| 15 | November 15, 1986 | 6–2 | Edmonton Oilers | 7–5–3 | W |
| 16 | November 19, 1986 | 1–4 | Montreal Canadiens | 7–6–3 | L |
| 17 | November 21, 1986 | 4–0 | St. Louis Blues | 8–6–3 | W |
| 18 | November 22, 1986 | 6–3 | @ New York Islanders | 9–6–3 | W |
| 19 | November 26, 1986 | 3–0 | Buffalo Sabres | 10–6–3 | W |
| 20 | November 29, 1986 | 7–5 | @ Montreal Canadiens | 11–6–3 | W |

December: 8–5–3 (home: 4–1–2; road: 4–4–1)

| Game | Date | Score | Opponent | Record | Recap |
|---|---|---|---|---|---|
| 21 | December 1, 1986 | 1–4 | @ Quebec Nordiques | 11–7–3 | L |
| 22 | December 3, 1986 | 2–1 | Quebec Nordiques | 12–7–3 | W |
| 23 | December 4, 1986 | 2–1 | @ Philadelphia Flyers | 13–7–3 | W |
| 24 | December 6, 1986 | 1–4 | Detroit Red Wings | 13–8–3 | L |
| 25 | December 10, 1986 | 6–2 | St. Louis Blues | 14–8–3 | W |
| 26 | December 13, 1986 | 2–2 OT | Vancouver Canucks | 14–8–4 | T |
| 27 | December 14, 1986 | 3–4 | @ Buffalo Sabres | 14–9–4 | L |
| 28 | December 17, 1986 | 4–3 | Buffalo Sabres | 15–9–4 | W |
| 29 | December 18, 1986 | 6–5 | @ Boston Bruins | 16–9–4 | W |
| 30 | December 20, 1986 | 2–2 OT | @ Detroit Red Wings | 16–9–5 | T |
| 31 | December 21, 1986 | 4–3 OT | @ New York Rangers | 17–9–5 | W |
| 32 | December 23, 1986 | 2–0 | Boston Bruins | 18–9–5 | W |
| 33 | December 26, 1986 | 1–1 OT | Montreal Canadiens | 18–9–6 | T |
| 34 | December 27, 1986 | 2–6 | @ Montreal Canadiens | 18–10–6 | L |
| 35 | December 30, 1986 | 3–1 | @ Washington Capitals | 19–10–6 | W |
| 36 | December 31, 1986 | 2–5 | @ Minnesota North Stars | 19–11–6 | L |

January: 7–9–0 (home: 4–2–0; road: 3–7–0)

| Game | Date | Score | Opponent | Record | Recap |
|---|---|---|---|---|---|
| 37 | January 3, 1987 | 2–3 | Chicago Blackhawks | 19–12–6 | L |
| 38 | January 4, 1987 | 8–3 | Toronto Maple Leafs | 20–12–6 | W |
| 39 | January 7, 1987 | 3–6 | @ St. Louis Blues | 20–13–6 | L |
| 40 | January 9, 1987 | 0–3 | @ Winnipeg Jets | 20–14–6 | L |
| 41 | January 10, 1987 | 3–4 | @ Minnesota North Stars | 20–15–6 | L |
| 42 | January 12, 1987 | 5–7 | @ New Jersey Devils | 20–16–6 | L |
| 43 | January 14, 1987 | 3–1 | Boston Bruins | 21–16–6 | W |
| 44 | January 15, 1987 | 4–6 | @ Boston Bruins | 21–17–6 | L |
| 45 | January 17, 1987 | 1–6 | Washington Capitals | 21–18–6 | L |
| 46 | January 19, 1987 | 5–4 OT | @ Montreal Canadiens | 22–18–6 | W |
| 47 | January 21, 1987 | 3–1 | Montreal Canadiens | 23–18–6 | W |
| 48 | January 23, 1987 | 3–2 | Quebec Nordiques | 24–18–6 | W |
| 49 | January 24, 1987 | 3–0 | @ Toronto Maple Leafs | 25–18–6 | W |
| 50 | January 27, 1987 | 2–4 | @ Quebec Nordiques | 25–19–6 | L |
| 51 | January 29, 1987 | 6–3 | @ Boston Bruins | 26–19–6 | W |
| 52 | January 31, 1987 | 2–4 | @ New York Islanders | 26–20–6 | L |

February: 7–4–0 (home: 3–2–0; road: 4–2–0)

| Game | Date | Score | Opponent | Record | Recap |
|---|---|---|---|---|---|
| 53 | February 1, 1987 | 8–6 | @ Pittsburgh Penguins | 27–20–6 | W |
| 54 | February 4, 1987 | 1–3 | Buffalo Sabres | 27–21–6 | L |
| 55 | February 6, 1987 | 5–2 | @ Washington Capitals | 28–21–6 | W |
| 56 | February 7, 1987 | 3–1 | Montreal Canadiens | 29–21–6 | W |
| 57 | February 14, 1987 | 2–5 | @ Los Angeles Kings | 29–22–6 | L |
| 58 | February 17, 1987 | 5–4 | @ Chicago Blackhawks | 30–22–6 | W |
| 59 | February 18, 1987 | 6–3 | @ New Jersey Devils | 31–22–6 | W |
| 60 | February 21, 1987 | 3–6 | Chicago Blackhawks | 31–23–6 | L |
| 61 | February 22, 1987 | 3–5 | @ Buffalo Sabres | 31–24–6 | L |
| 62 | February 25, 1987 | 6–4 | Boston Bruins | 32–24–6 | W |
| 63 | February 28, 1987 | 2–1 | Quebec Nordiques | 33–24–6 | W |

March: 9–4–1 (home: 7–2–1; road: 2–2–0)

| Game | Date | Score | Opponent | Record | Recap |
|---|---|---|---|---|---|
| 64 | March 1, 1987 | 5–5 OT | New Jersey Devils | 33–24–7 | T |
| 65 | March 3, 1987 | 5–3 | Detroit Red Wings | 34–24–7 | W |
| 66 | March 5, 1987 | 10–2 | Boston Bruins | 35–24–7 | W |
| 67 | March 7, 1987 | 5–3 | Philadelphia Flyers | 36–24–7 | W |
| 68 | March 10, 1987 | 4–6 | @ Quebec Nordiques | 36–25–7 | L |
| 69 | March 11, 1987 | 1–6 | Calgary Flames | 36–26–7 | L |
| 70 | March 13, 1987 | 3–0 | @ Winnipeg Jets | 37–26–7 | W |
| 71 | March 15, 1987 | 1–4 | @ Edmonton Oilers | 37–27–7 | L |
| 72 | March 18, 1987 | 5–3 | @ New York Rangers | 38–27–7 | W |
| 73 | March 21, 1987 | 5–1 | Minnesota North Stars | 39–27–7 | W |
| 74 | March 22, 1987 | 6–3 | Los Angeles Kings | 40–27–7 | W |
| 75 | March 25, 1987 | 3–5 | Edmonton Oilers | 40–28–7 | L |
| 76 | March 28, 1987 | 5–4 | Pittsburgh Penguins | 41–28–7 | W |
| 77 | March 29, 1987 | 7–4 | Vancouver Canucks | 42–28–7 | W |

April: 1–2–0 (home: 1–0–0; road: 0–2–0)

| Game | Date | Score | Opponent | Record | Recap |
|---|---|---|---|---|---|
| 78 | April 1, 1987 | 2–3 | @ Montreal Canadiens | 42–29–7 | L |
| 79 | April 4, 1987 | 5–3 | New York Rangers | 43–29–7 | W |
| 80 | April 5, 1987 | 0–6 | @ Buffalo Sabres | 43–30–7 | L |

Legend: W Win (2 points) L Loss (0 points) T Tie (1 point)

=== Playoffs ===
1987 Stanley Cup playoffs
Adams Division Semifinals vs. (A4) Quebec Nordiques – Nordiques win 4–2

| Game | Date | Score | Opponent | Series | Recap |
|---|---|---|---|---|---|
| 1 | April 8, 1987 | 3–2 OT | Quebec Nordiques | Whalers lead 1–0 | W |
| 2 | April 9, 1987 | 5–4 | Quebec Nordiques | Whalers lead 2–0 | W |
| 3 | April 11, 1987 | 1–5 | @ Quebec Nordiques | Whalers lead 2–1 | L |
| 4 | April 12, 1987 | 1–4 | @ Quebec Nordiques | Series tied 2–2 | L |
| 5 | April 14, 1987 | 5–7 | Quebec Nordiques | Nordiques lead 3–2 | L |
| 6 | April 16, 1987 | 4–5 OT | @ Quebec Nordiques | Nordiques win 4–2 | L |

Legend: W Win L Loss

== Player statistics ==
=== Forwards ===
Note: GP = Games played; G = Goals; A = Assists; Pts = Points; PIM = Penalty minutes

| Player | GP | G | A | Pts | +/- | PIM |
|---|---|---|---|---|---|---|
| Ron Francis | 75 | 30 | 63 | 93 | 10 | 45 |
| Kevin Dineen | 78 | 40 | 39 | 79 | 7 | 110 |
| John Anderson | 76 | 31 | 44 | 75 | 11 | 19 |
| Ray Ferraro | 80 | 27 | 32 | 59 | –9 | 42 |
| Dean Evason | 80 | 22 | 37 | 59 | 5 | 67 |
| Paul Lawless | 60 | 22 | 32 | 54 | 24 | 14 |
| Stewart Gavin | 79 | 20 | 21 | 41 | 10 | 28 |
| Sylvain Turgeon | 41 | 23 | 13 | 36 | –3 | 45 |
| Dave Tippett | 80 | 9 | 22 | 31 | 0 | 42 |
| Doug Jarvis | 80 | 9 | 13 | 22 | 0 | 20 |
| Paul MacDermid | 72 | 7 | 11 | 18 | 3 | 202 |
| Dave Semenko | 51 | 4 | 8 | 12 | –7 | 87 |
| Mike Millar | 10 | 2 | 2 | 4 | 3 | 0 |
| Torrie Robertson | 20 | 1 | 0 | 1 | –6 | 98 |
| Bill Gardner | 8 | 0 | 1 | 1 | –2 | 0 |
| Shane Churla | 20 | 0 | 1 | 1 | –1 | 78 |
| Greg Britz | 1 | 0 | 0 | 0 | 0 | 0 |
| Pat Hughes | 2 | 0 | 0 | 0 | –1 | 2 |
| Yves Courteau | 4 | 0 | 0 | 0 | –6 | 0 |
| Wayne Babych | 4 | 0 | 0 | 0 | –5 | 4 |
| Gord Sherven | 25 | 0 | 0 | 0 | 0 | 0 |

=== Defensemen ===
Note: GP = Games played; G = Goals; A = Assists; Pts = Points; PIM = Penalty minutes

| Player | GP | G | A | Pts | +/- | PIM |
|---|---|---|---|---|---|---|
| Dave Babych | 66 | 8 | 33 | 41 | –18 | 44 |
| Ulf Samuelsson | 78 | 2 | 21 | 23 | 28 | 162 |
| Dana Murzyn | 74 | 9 | 19 | 28 | 17 | 95 |
| Mike McEwen | 48 | 8 | 8 | 16 | –9 | 32 |
| Scot Kleinendorst | 66 | 3 | 9 | 12 | 4 | 130 |
| Joel Quenneville | 37 | 3 | 7 | 10 | 7 | 24 |
| Tim Bothwell | 4 | 1 | 0 | 1 | –5 | 0 |
| Brad Shaw | 2 | 0 | 0 | 0 | 0 | 0 |

=== Goaltending ===
Note: GP = Games played; W = Wins; L = Losses; T = Ties; SO = Shutouts; GAA = Goals against average

| Player | GP | MIN | W | L | T | SO | GAA |
|---|---|---|---|---|---|---|---|
| Mike Liut | 59 | 3476 | 31 | 22 | 5 | 4 | 3.23 |
| Steve Weeks | 25 | 1367 | 12 | 8 | 2 | 1 | 3.42 |

== Awards and honors ==
- Doug Jarvis, Bill Masterton Memorial Trophy

== Transactions ==
The Whalers were involved in the following transactions during the 1986–87 season.

=== Trades ===
| October 7, 1986 | To Calgary Flames Mark Paterson | To Hartford Whalers Yves Courteau |
| October 21, 1986 | To St. Louis Blues Tim Bothwell | To Hartford Whalers Dave Barr |
| December 12, 1986 | To Edmonton Oilers 3rd round pick in 1988 – Trevor Sim | To Hartford Whalers Dave Semenko |
| January 12, 1987 | To Detroit Red Wings Dave Barr | To Hartford Whalers Randy Ladouceur |
| March 10, 1987 | To St. Louis Blues 10th round pick in 1987 – Andy Cesarski | To Hartford Whalers Pat Hughes |

=== Waivers ===
| October 6, 1986 | From Edmonton Oilers Gord Sherven |

=== Free agents ===
| Player | Former team |
| Dallas Gaume | University of Denver (NCAA) |
| Greg Britz | Toronto Maple Leafs |

| Player | New team |
| John Newberry | Oulun Kärpät (Finland) |
| Peter Dineen | Los Angeles Kings |
| Paul Fenton | New York Rangers |

== Draft picks ==
Hartford's draft picks at the 1986 NHL entry draft.

| Round | # | Player | Position | Nationality | College/junior/club team (League) |
|---|---|---|---|---|---|
| 1 | 11 | Scott Young | Right wing | United States | Boston University (Hockey East) |
| 2 | 32 | Marc Laforge | Defense | Canada | Kingston Canadians (OHL) |
| 4 | 74 | Brian Chapman | Defense | Canada | Belleville Bulls (OHL) |
| 5 | 95 | Bill Horn | Goaltender | Canada | Western Michigan University (CCHA) |
| 6 | 116 | Joe Quinn | Right wing | Canada | Calgary Canucks (AJHL) |
| 7 | 137 | Steve Torrel | Center | United States | Hibbing High School (USHS-MN) |
| 8 | 158 | Ron Hoover | Left wing | Canada | Western Michigan University (CCHA) |
| 9 | 179 | Rob Glasgow | Right wing | Canada | Sherwood Park Crusaders (AJHL) |
| 10 | 200 | Sean Evoy | Goaltender | Canada | Cornwall Royals (OHL) |
| 11 | 221 | Cal Brown | Defense | Canada | Penticton Knights (BCJHL) |
| 12 | 242 | Brian Verbeek | Center | Canada | Kingston Canadians (OHL) |
| S2 | 14 | Joe Tracy | Right wing | United States | Ohio State University (CCHA) |
