= 1986–87 Quebec Nordiques season =

National Hockey League team season

1986–87 Quebec Nordiques
- Division: 4th Adams
- Conference: 8th Wales
- 1986–87 record: 31–39–10
- Goals for: 267
- Goals against: 276

Team information
- General manager: Maurice Filion
- Coach: Michel Bergeron
- Captain: Peter Stastny
- Arena: Colisée de Québec

Team leaders
- Goals: Michel Goulet (49)
- Assists: Peter Stastny (53)
- Points: Michel Goulet (96)
- Penalty minutes: Paul Gillis (267)
- Wins: Clint Malarchuk (18)
- Goals against average: Mario Gosselin (3.18)

The 1986–87 Quebec Nordiques season was the Nordiques eighth season in the National Hockey League (NHL). An aspect of the Quebec Nordiques season was that it hosted Rendez-vous '87, a series of two matches consisting of NHL All-Stars versus Soviet All-Stars.

== Offseason ==
Quebec had a very quiet off-season, as the only notable player movement was Alain Lemieux leaving the club as a free agent, as he signed a contract with the Pittsburgh Penguins. Lemieux only appeared in seven regular season games with the Nordiques, getting no points, however, Lemieux did play in a playoff game, earning a goal and three points. He finished second in scoring on the Fredericton Express, earning 74 points.

== Regular season ==
Quebec started the season off hot, going 6–2–2 in their first ten games, however, a 7–11–2 record over their next twenty games saw the Nordiques fall to 13–13–4. The club continued to struggle, going 6–13–3, to fall to 19–26–7, and battling the Buffalo Sabres for the final playoff spot in the Adams Division. Quebec would finish the season with a 31–39–10 record, earning 72 points, which was the team's worst point total since their first season in 1979–80. The Nordiques finished in fourth place, and earned a playoff spot for the seventh straight season.

Offensively, Michel Goulet led the way, scoring 49 goals and 96 points to lead the Nordiques. Peter Stastny had an injury plagued season, missing 18 games, however, he still scored 24 goals and 77 points to finish in second in team scoring. Anton Stastny and Brent Ashton each cleared the 20 goal plateau, as they had 27 and 25 respectively.

On the blueline, Risto Siltanen had 10 goals and 39 points to lead the defence, while Jeff Brown had seven goals and 29 points in only 44 games played with Quebec.

In goal, Clint Malarchuk played the majority of the games, as his 18 wins were a team high. Mario Gosselin had 13 wins, and posted a team best 3.18 GAA in 30 games.

=== Rendez-vous '87 ===
Rendez-vous '87 was an ice hockey exhibition series between the Soviet Union men's national ice hockey team and a team of All-Stars from the National Hockey League, held in Quebec City. It replaced the NHL's All-Star festivities for the 1986–87 NHL season. The Soviet team was paid $80,000 for their appearance in Rendez-vous '87, while the NHLers raised $350,000 for the players' pension fund.

Rendez-vous '87 was designed as a follow-up to the Challenge Cup series in 1979, hoping that the team of NHL All-Stars could beat the Soviet team, unlike before. To this end, the series was a two-game affair instead of a three-game affair in 1979. The two-game series took place during five days of festivities starting on February 9, 1987, and finishing on February 13. The series was very successful, with some, including Wayne Gretzky, calling for more international hockey, especially between Canada and the Soviet Union, the two top powers of hockey at the time.

=== Final standings ===
Adams Division
| | GP | W | L | T | GF | GA | Pts |
|---|---|---|---|---|---|---|---|
| **Hartford Whalers** | 80 | 43 | 30 | 7 | 287 | 270 | 93 |
| **Montreal Canadiens** | 80 | 41 | 29 | 10 | 277 | 241 | 92 |
| **Boston Bruins** | 80 | 39 | 34 | 7 | 301 | 276 | 85 |
| **Quebec Nordiques** | 80 | 31 | 39 | 10 | 267 | 276 | 72 |
| Buffalo Sabres | 80 | 28 | 44 | 8 | 280 | 308 | 64 |

Note: GP = Games played, W = Wins, L = Losses, T = Ties, Pts = Points, GF = Goals for, GA = Goals against
Note: Teams that qualified for the playoffs are highlighted in bold.

=== Record vs. opponents ===
Adams Division record vs. opponents

==== Vs. Wales Conference ====
**Vs. Adams Division**

1986–87 NHL records
| Team | **BOS** | **BUF** | **HFD** | **MTL** | **QUE** | **Total** |
|---|---|---|---|---|---|---|
| Boston | — | 3–4–1 | 2–6 | 2–5–1 | 6–2 | **13–17–2** |
| Buffalo | 4–3–1 | — | 4–4 | 1–5–2 | 3–4–1 | **12–16–4** |
| Hartford | 6–2 | 4–4 | — | 4–3–1 | 3–3–2 | **17–12–3** |
| Montreal | 5–2–1 | 5–1–2 | 3–4−1 | — | 5–3 | **18–10–4** |
| Quebec | 2–6 | 4–3–1 | 3–3–2 | 3–5 | — | **12–17–3** |

**Vs. Patrick Division**

1986–87 NHL records
| Team | **NJD** | **NYI** | **NYR** | **PHI** | **PIT** | **WSH** | **Total** |
|---|---|---|---|---|---|---|---|
| Boston | 1–1–1 | 2–0–1 | 1–2 | 1–2 | 2–1 | 1–1–1 | **8–7–3** |
| Buffalo | 2–1 | 1–1–1 | 1–2 | 1–2 | 0–2–1 | 2–1 | **7–9–2** |
| Hartford | 1–1–1 | 2–1 | 3–0 | 2–1 | 3–0 | 2–1 | **13–4–1** |
| Montreal | 2–1 | 1–1–1 | 2–0–1 | 0–2–1 | 1–1–1 | 0–3 | **6–8–4** |
| Quebec | 1–0–2 | 1–2 | 1–2 | 0–2–1 | 0–3 | 2–0–1 | **5–9–4** |

==== Vs. Campbell Conference ====
**Vs. Norris Division**

1986–87 NHL records
| Team | **CHI** | **DET** | **MIN** | **STL** | **TOR** | **Total** |
|---|---|---|---|---|---|---|
| Boston | 1–1–1 | 0–2–1 | 3–0 | 2–1 | 2–1 | **8–5–2** |
| Buffalo | 2–1 | 2–0–1 | 0–3 | 1–2 | 0–2–1 | **5–8–2** |
| Hartford | 1–2 | 1–1–1 | 1–2 | 2–1 | 2–1 | **7–7–1** |
| Montreal | 2–0–1 | 1–1–1 | 2–1 | 2–1 | 2–1 | **9–4–2** |
| Quebec | 2–1 | 1–2 | 2–0–1 | 0–3 | 3–0 | **8–6–1** |

**Vs. Smythe Division**

1986–87 NHL records
| Team | **CGY** | **EDM** | **LAK** | **VAN** | **WIN** | **Total** |
|---|---|---|---|---|---|---|
| Boston | 2–1 | 2–1 | 2–1 | 2–1 | 2–1 | **10–5–0** |
| Buffalo | 0–3 | 1–2 | 2–1 | 0–3 | 1–2 | **4–11–0** |
| Hartford | 1–2 | 1–2 | 1–2 | 2–0–1 | 1–1–1 | **6–7–2** |
| Montreal | 2–1 | 0–3 | 3–0 | 1–2 | 2–1 | **8–7–0** |
| Quebec | 1–2 | 0–3 | 3–0 | 2–1 | 0–1–2 | **6–7–2** |

== Schedule and results ==
1986–87 regular season
October

| Game | Result | Date | Score | Opponent | Record |
|---|---|---|---|---|---|
| 1 | W | October 9, 1986 | 6–1 | Detroit Red Wings (1986–87) | 1–0–0 |
| 2 | T | October 11, 1986 | 4–4 OT | Minnesota North Stars (1986–87) | 1–0–1 |
| 3 | W | October 13, 1986 | 7–1 | @ Vancouver Canucks (1986–87) | 2–0–1 |
| 4 | L | October 15, 1986 | 2–5 | @ Edmonton Oilers (1986–87) | 2–1–1 |
| 5 | W | October 16, 1986 | 4–2 | @ Calgary Flames (1986–87) | 3–1–1 |
| 6 | L | October 18, 1986 | 3–4 | @ St. Louis Blues (1986–87) | 3–2–1 |
| 7 | T | October 21, 1986 | 4–4 OT | Washington Capitals (1986–87) | 3–2–2 |
| 8 | W | October 22, 1986 | 7–1 | @ Toronto Maple Leafs (1986–87) | 4–2–2 |
| 9 | W | October 25, 1986 | 4–3 | Toronto Maple Leafs (1986–87) | 5–2–2 |
| 10 | W | October 28, 1986 | 6–2 | Los Angeles Kings (1986–87) | 6–2–2 |
| 11 | L | October 30, 1986 | 3–6 | @ Philadelphia Flyers (1986–87) | 6–3–2 |

November

| Game | Result | Date | Score | Opponent | Record |
|---|---|---|---|---|---|
| 12 | T | November 1, 1986 | 2–2 OT | @ Hartford Whalers (1986–87) | 6–3–3 |
| 13 | T | November 2, 1986 | 3–3 OT | Hartford Whalers (1986–87) | 6–3–4 |
| 14 | L | November 4, 1986 | 3–6 | Winnipeg Jets (1986–87) | 6–4–4 |
| 15 | L | November 8, 1986 | 1–5 | Boston Bruins (1986–87) | 6–5–4 |
| 16 | W | November 9, 1986 | 6–5 | New York Rangers (1986–87) | 7–5–4 |
| 17 | L | November 12, 1986 | 3–4 | @ Montreal Canadiens (1986–87) | 7–6–4 |
| 18 | W | November 14, 1986 | 4–1 | @ Washington Capitals (1986–87) | 8–6–4 |
| 19 | L | November 15, 1986 | 2–5 | @ Pittsburgh Penguins (1986–87) | 8–7–4 |
| 20 | L | November 18, 1986 | 3–4 OT | New York Islanders (1986–87) | 8–8–4 |
| 21 | W | November 21, 1986 | 6–1 | @ Buffalo Sabres (1986–87) | 9–8–4 |
| 22 | W | November 22, 1986 | 3–1 | Buffalo Sabres (1986–87) | 10–8–4 |
| 23 | W | November 25, 1986 | 2–1 | Montreal Canadiens (1986–87) | 11–8–4 |
| 24 | L | November 26, 1986 | 2–4 | @ New York Rangers (1986–87) | 11–9–4 |
| 25 | W | November 29, 1986 | 4–3 | Washington Capitals (1986–87) | 12–9–4 |

December

| Game | Result | Date | Score | Opponent | Record |
|---|---|---|---|---|---|
| 26 | W | December 1, 1986 | 4–1 | Hartford Whalers (1986–87) | 13–9–4 |
| 27 | L | December 3, 1986 | 1–2 | @ Hartford Whalers (1986–87) | 13–10–4 |
| 28 | L | December 4, 1986 | 2–3 | @ Boston Bruins (1986–87) | 13–11–4 |
| 29 | L | December 6, 1986 | 2–3 | Calgary Flames (1986–87) | 13–12–4 |
| 30 | L | December 9, 1986 | 1–4 | St. Louis Blues (1986–87) | 13–13–4 |
| 31 | W | December 13, 1986 | 7–0 | Buffalo Sabres (1986–87) | 14–13–4 |
| 32 | L | December 14, 1986 | 2–6 | Boston Bruins (1986–87) | 14–14–4 |
| 33 | L | December 17, 1986 | 3–5 | @ Edmonton Oilers (1986–87) | 14–15–4 |
| 34 | L | December 18, 1986 | 2–6 | @ Calgary Flames (1986–87) | 14–16–4 |
| 35 | W | December 20, 1986 | 4–1 | @ Minnesota North Stars (1986–87) | 15–16–4 |
| 36 | T | December 21, 1986 | 4–4 OT | @ Winnipeg Jets (1986–87) | 15–16–5 |
| 37 | T | December 27, 1986 | 2–2 OT | New Jersey Devils (1986–87) | 15–16–6 |
| 38 | W | December 30, 1986 | 6–3 | Montreal Canadiens (1986–87) | 16–16–6 |
| 39 | L | December 31, 1986 | 1–4 | @ Montreal Canadiens (1986–87) | 16–17–6 |

January

| Game | Result | Date | Score | Opponent | Record |
|---|---|---|---|---|---|
| 40 | L | January 3, 1987 | 2–5 | New York Rangers (1986–87) | 16–18–6 |
| 41 | L | January 4, 1987 | 2–7 | @ Buffalo Sabres (1986–87) | 16–19–6 |
| 42 | W | January 6, 1987 | 3–2 | Vancouver Canucks (1986–87) | 17–19–6 |
| 43 | T | January 8, 1987 | 4–4 OT | @ New Jersey Devils (1986–87) | 17–19–7 |
| 44 | L | January 10, 1987 | 2–5 | @ Montreal Canadiens (1986–87) | 17–20–7 |
| 45 | L | January 15, 1987 | 1–4 | Edmonton Oilers (1986–87) | 17–21–7 |
| 46 | L | January 17, 1987 | 2–3 | @ Detroit Red Wings (1986–87) | 17–22–7 |
| 47 | W | January 18, 1987 | 5–3 | @ Chicago Blackhawks (1986–87) | 18–22–7 |
| 48 | L | January 20, 1987 | 3–5 | Boston Bruins (1986–87) | 18–23–7 |
| 49 | L | January 23, 1987 | 2–3 | @ Hartford Whalers (1986–87) | 18–24–7 |
| 50 | L | January 24, 1987 | 1–2 OT | New York Islanders (1986–87) | 18–25–7 |
| 51 | W | January 27, 1987 | 4–2 | Hartford Whalers (1986–87) | 19–25–7 |
| 52 | L | January 30, 1987 | 1–3 | @ Buffalo Sabres (1986–87) | 19–26–7 |

February

| Game | Result | Date | Score | Opponent | Record |
|---|---|---|---|---|---|
| 53 | W | February 1, 1987 | 3–2 | Los Angeles Kings (1986–87) | 20–26–7 |
| 54 | W | February 3, 1987 | 4–1 | Montreal Canadiens (1986–87) | 21–26–7 |
| 55 | L | February 4, 1987 | 3–4 | @ Montreal Canadiens (1986–87) | 21–27–7 |
| 56 | W | February 7, 1987 | 5–2 | Buffalo Sabres (1986–87) | 22–27–7 |
| 57 | W | February 8, 1987 | 2–1 | @ Boston Bruins (1986–87) | 23–27–7 |
| 58 | L | February 15, 1987 | 4–6 | @ Chicago Blackhawks (1986–87) | 23–28–7 |
| 59 | T | February 17, 1987 | 3–3 OT | Winnipeg Jets (1986–87) | 23–28–8 |
| 60 | L | February 20, 1987 | 3–6 | @ Detroit Red Wings (1986–87) | 23–29–8 |
| 61 | L | February 21, 1987 | 3–4 OT | @ St. Louis Blues (1986–87) | 23–30–8 |
| 62 | W | February 24, 1987 | 5–4 | Minnesota North Stars (1986–87) | 24–30–8 |
| 63 | L | February 26, 1987 | 2–6 | @ Boston Bruins (1986–87) | 24–31–8 |
| 64 | L | February 28, 1987 | 1–2 | @ Hartford Whalers (1986–87) | 24–32–8 |

March

| Game | Result | Date | Score | Opponent | Record |
|---|---|---|---|---|---|
| 65 | L | March 3, 1987 | 1–8 | Pittsburgh Penguins (1986–87) | 24–33–8 |
| 66 | T | March 7, 1987 | 5–5 OT | Buffalo Sabres (1986–87) | 24–33–9 |
| 67 | L | March 8, 1987 | 1–5 | @ Buffalo Sabres (1986–87) | 24–34–9 |
| 68 | W | March 10, 1987 | 6–4 | Hartford Whalers (1986–87) | 25–34–9 |
| 69 | L | March 12, 1987 | 3–6 | @ Pittsburgh Penguins (1986–87) | 25–35–9 |
| 70 | W | March 14, 1987 | 6–3 | @ Los Angeles Kings (1986–87) | 26–35–9 |
| 71 | L | March 17, 1987 | 2–4 | @ Vancouver Canucks (1986–87) | 26–36–9 |
| 72 | W | March 20, 1987 | 5–4 | Toronto Maple Leafs (1986–87) | 27–36–9 |
| 73 | T | March 21, 1987 | 2–2 OT | Philadelphia Flyers (1986–87) | 27–36–10 |
| 74 | L | March 24, 1987 | 3–4 | Montreal Canadiens (1986–87) | 27–37–10 |
| 75 | L | March 26, 1987 | 2–3 OT | @ Philadelphia Flyers (1986–87) | 27–38–10 |
| 76 | W | March 28, 1987 | 5–4 | Chicago Blackhawks (1986–87) | 28–38–10 |
| 77 | L | March 31, 1987 | 3–4 | Boston Bruins (1986–87) | 28–39–10 |

April

| Game | Result | Date | Score | Opponent | Record |
|---|---|---|---|---|---|
| 78 | W | April 2, 1987 | 4–1 | @ New York Islanders (1986–87) | 29–39–10 |
| 79 | W | April 4, 1987 | 8–4 | New Jersey Devils (1986–87) | 30–39–10 |
| 80 | W | April 5, 1987 | 6–4 | @ Boston Bruins (1986–87) | 31–39–10 |

Legend: Win (2 points) Loss (0 points) Tie (1 point)

== Player statistics ==
Regular season
Scoring

| Player | Pos | GP | G | A | Pts | PIM | +/- | PPG | SHG | GWG |
|---|---|---|---|---|---|---|---|---|---|---|
| Michel Goulet | LW | 75 | 49 | 47 | 96 | 61 | −12 | 17 | 0 | 6 |
| Peter Stastny | C | 64 | 24 | 53 | 77 | 43 | −21 | 12 | 0 | 4 |
| Anton Stastny | LW | 77 | 27 | 35 | 62 | 8 | 3 | 6 | 0 | 5 |
| Brent Ashton | LW | 46 | 25 | 19 | 44 | 17 | −12 | 12 | 2 | 1 |
| Paul Gillis | C | 76 | 13 | 26 | 39 | 267 | −5 | 0 | 0 | 3 |
| Dale Hunter | C | 46 | 10 | 29 | 39 | 135 | 4 | 0 | 0 | 0 |
| Risto Siltanen | D | 66 | 10 | 29 | 39 | 32 | −2 | 8 | 0 | 1 |
| Alain Cote | LW | 80 | 12 | 24 | 36 | 38 | −4 | 0 | 2 | 1 |
| Mike Eagles | C/LW | 73 | 13 | 19 | 32 | 55 | −15 | 0 | 2 | 2 |
| Jeff Brown | D | 44 | 7 | 22 | 29 | 16 | 11 | 3 | 0 | 0 |
| Jason Lafreniere | C | 56 | 13 | 15 | 28 | 8 | −3 | 7 | 0 | 1 |
| Robert Picard | D | 78 | 8 | 20 | 28 | 71 | −17 | 1 | 1 | 3 |
| John Ogrodnick | LW | 32 | 11 | 16 | 27 | 4 | −6 | 2 | 0 | 1 |
| David Shaw | D | 75 | 0 | 19 | 19 | 69 | −35 | 0 | 0 | 0 |
| Normand Rochefort | D | 70 | 6 | 9 | 15 | 46 | 2 | 0 | 0 | 0 |
| Basil McRae | LW | 33 | 9 | 5 | 14 | 149 | 1 | 3 | 0 | 1 |
| Mike Hough | LW | 56 | 6 | 8 | 14 | 79 | −8 | 1 | 1 | 0 |
| Randy Moller | D | 71 | 5 | 9 | 14 | 144 | −11 | 1 | 0 | 1 |
| Lane Lambert | RW | 15 | 5 | 5 | 10 | 18 | −1 | 0 | 0 | 0 |
| Ken Quinney | RW | 25 | 2 | 7 | 9 | 16 | 2 | 1 | 0 | 0 |
| Mark Kumpel | RW | 40 | 1 | 8 | 9 | 16 | −12 | 0 | 0 | 0 |
| Bill Derlago | C | 18 | 3 | 5 | 8 | 6 | −4 | 0 | 0 | 0 |
| Steven Finn | D | 36 | 2 | 5 | 7 | 40 | −8 | 0 | 0 | 0 |
| Pat Price | D | 47 | 0 | 6 | 6 | 81 | −7 | 0 | 0 | 0 |
| Jean-Francois Sauve | C | 14 | 2 | 3 | 5 | 4 | −4 | 2 | 0 | 0 |
| Max Middendorf | RW | 6 | 1 | 4 | 5 | 4 | −2 | 0 | 0 | 0 |
| Mario Gosselin | G | 30 | 0 | 3 | 3 | 20 | 0 | 0 | 0 | 0 |
| Gilbert Delorme | D | 19 | 2 | 0 | 2 | 14 | −1 | 0 | 0 | 0 |
| Gord Donnelly | D | 38 | 0 | 2 | 2 | 143 | −3 | 0 | 0 | 0 |
| Clint Malarchuk | G | 54 | 0 | 2 | 2 | 37 | 0 | 0 | 0 | 0 |
| Doug Shedden | C | 16 | 0 | 2 | 2 | 8 | −5 | 0 | 0 | 0 |
| Richard Zemlak | RW | 20 | 0 | 2 | 2 | 47 | 0 | 0 | 0 | 0 |
| Trevor Stienburg | RW | 6 | 1 | 0 | 1 | 12 | 0 | 0 | 0 | 1 |
| Greg Malone | C | 6 | 0 | 1 | 1 | 0 | 0 | 0 | 0 | 0 |
| Yves Heroux | RW | 1 | 0 | 0 | 0 | 0 | 0 | 0 | 0 | 0 |
| Daniel Poudrier | D | 6 | 0 | 0 | 0 | 0 | −2 | 0 | 0 | 0 |
| Richard Sevigny | G | 4 | 0 | 0 | 0 | 14 | 0 | 0 | 0 | 0 |
| Scott Shaunessy | D/LW | 3 | 0 | 0 | 0 | 7 | −1 | 0 | 0 | 0 |

Goaltending

| Player | MIN | GP | W | L | T | GA | GAA | SO | SA | SV | SV% |
|---|---|---|---|---|---|---|---|---|---|---|---|
| Clint Malarchuk | 3092 | 54 | 18 | 26 | 9 | 175 | 3.40 | 1 | 1512 | 1337 | .884 |
| Mario Gosselin | 1625 | 30 | 13 | 11 | 1 | 86 | 3.18 | 0 | 758 | 672 | .887 |
| Richard Sevigny | 144 | 4 | 0 | 2 | 0 | 11 | 4.58 | 0 | 56 | 45 | .804 |
| Team: | 4861 | 80 | 31 | 39 | 10 | 272 | 3.36 | 1 | 2326 | 2054 | .883 |

Playoffs
Scoring

| Player | Pos | GP | G | A | Pts | PIM | +/- | PPG | SHG | GWG |
|---|---|---|---|---|---|---|---|---|---|---|
| Peter Stastny | C | 13 | 6 | 9 | 15 | 12 | 3 | 2 | 1 | 1 |
| Michel Goulet | LW | 13 | 9 | 5 | 14 | 35 | −2 | 4 | 0 | 2 |
| John Ogrodnick | LW | 13 | 9 | 4 | 13 | 6 | 0 | 3 | 0 | 2 |
| Robert Picard | D | 13 | 2 | 10 | 12 | 10 | 3 | 1 | 0 | 0 |
| Anton Stastny | LW | 13 | 3 | 8 | 11 | 6 | 0 | 0 | 0 | 0 |
| Risto Siltanen | D | 13 | 1 | 9 | 10 | 8 | −4 | 1 | 0 | 0 |
| Dale Hunter | C | 13 | 1 | 7 | 8 | 56 | −5 | 1 | 0 | 0 |
| Jeff Brown | D | 13 | 3 | 3 | 6 | 2 | −3 | 2 | 0 | 0 |
| Paul Gillis | C | 13 | 2 | 4 | 6 | 65 | 3 | 0 | 0 | 0 |
| Lane Lambert | RW | 13 | 2 | 4 | 6 | 30 | 2 | 0 | 0 | 0 |
| Jason Lafreniere | C | 12 | 1 | 5 | 6 | 2 | −1 | 1 | 0 | 0 |
| Alain Cote | LW | 13 | 2 | 3 | 5 | 2 | 0 | 0 | 0 | 0 |
| Randy Moller | D | 13 | 1 | 4 | 5 | 23 | 5 | 0 | 0 | 0 |
| Basil McRae | LW | 13 | 3 | 1 | 4 | 99 | −1 | 0 | 0 | 1 |
| Normand Rochefort | D | 13 | 2 | 1 | 3 | 26 | −3 | 0 | 0 | 1 |
| Mike Hough | LW | 9 | 0 | 3 | 3 | 26 | −1 | 0 | 0 | 0 |
| Steven Finn | D | 13 | 0 | 2 | 2 | 29 | 1 | 0 | 0 | 0 |
| Mike Eagles | C/LW | 4 | 1 | 0 | 1 | 10 | −1 | 0 | 0 | 0 |
| Gord Donnelly | D | 13 | 0 | 0 | 0 | 53 | −2 | 0 | 0 | 0 |
| Mario Gosselin | G | 11 | 0 | 0 | 0 | 2 | 0 | 0 | 0 | 0 |
| Clint Malarchuk | G | 3 | 0 | 0 | 0 | 0 | 0 | 0 | 0 | 0 |
| Greg Malone | C | 1 | 0 | 0 | 0 | 0 | 0 | 0 | 0 | 0 |

Goaltending

| Player | MIN | GP | W | L | GA | GAA | SO | SA | SV | SV% |
|---|---|---|---|---|---|---|---|---|---|---|
| Mario Gosselin | 654 | 11 | 7 | 4 | 37 | 3.39 | 0 | 326 | 289 | .887 |
| Clint Malarchuk | 140 | 3 | 0 | 2 | 8 | 3.43 | 0 | 56 | 48 | .857 |
| Team: | 794 | 13 | 7 | 6 | 45 | 3.40 | 0 | 382 | 337 | .882 |

Note:

Pos = Position;GP = Games played; G = Goals; A = Assists; Pts = Points; PIM = Penalty minutes; +/- = Plus/minus; PPG = Power-play goals; SHG = Short-handed goals; GWG = Game-winning goals
Pos = Position;GP = Games played; Min, TOI = Minutes played; W = Wins; L = Losses; T,T/OT = Ties; OTL = Overtime losses; GA = Goals-against; GAA = Goals-against average; SO = Shutouts; SA = Shots against; SV = Shots saved;SV% = Save percentage;

== Playoffs ==
Quebec opened the 1987 Stanley Cup playoffs with a first round matchup against the Hartford Whalers in a best of seven series. The Whalers, who swept the Nordiques in 1986, finished the season in first place in the Adams Division with a 43-30-7 record, earning 93 points, which was 21 more than Quebec. The series began with two games at the Hartford Civic Center, and the Whalers continued their winning ways against the Nordiques in the playoffs, winning the first game 3–2 in overtime, followed by a narrow 5–4 victory over Quebec in the second game to take a 2–0 series lead. With the series moving to Le Colisée for the next two games, the Nordiques responded, easily defeating Hartford 5–1 in the third game, followed by a 4–1 win in the fourth game to even the series at two. The series shifted back to Hartford for the fifth game, however, the Nordiques came out ahead with a solid 7–5 victory, to take a 3–2 series lead. Quebec would complete the upset, winning 5–4 in overtime in the sixth game in Quebec City, to win the series 4–2.

The Nordiques then moved on to face the Montreal Canadiens, the defending Stanley Cup champions, in the Battle of Quebec in the best of seven Adams Division final. Montreal had a 41-29-10 record, getting 92 points, which was 20 more than the Nordiques. Montreal swept the Boston Bruins in four games in the first round of the playoffs. The series opened with two games at the Montreal Forum, but it was the Nordiques, who stayed hot, took a 2–0 series lead, defeating the Canadiens 7–5 in the series opener, followed by a 2–1 win in the second game. The series moved to Le Colisée for the next two games, and the Canadiens rebounded, easily defeating the Nordiques 7–2 in the third game, then tied the series with a 3–2 overtime win in the fourth game. In the fifth game back in Montreal, the Canadiens held off the Nordiques once again, winning 3–2 to take the series lead after a goal by Alain Cote was waived off early in the third period. Quebec then tied the series up in the sixth game, hanging on with a 3–2 win, to force a seventh and deciding game. In the seventh game, the Canadiens proved to be too strong for Quebec, defeating the Nordiques 5–3 to win the series. This would be the Nordiques last playoff appearance until 1993.

1987 Stanley Cup playoffs
Adams Division Semifinals vs. (A1) Hartford Whalers – Nordiques win 4–2

| Game | Date | Visitor | Score | Home | Series |
|---|---|---|---|---|---|
| 1 | April 8 | Quebec Nordiques | 2–3 | Hartford Whalers | 0–1 |
| 2 | April 9 | Quebec Nordiques | 4–5 | Hartford Whalers | 0–2 |
| 3 | April 11 | Hartford Whalers | 1–5 | Quebec Nordiques | 1–2 |
| 4 | April 12 | Hartford Whalers | 1–4 | Quebec Nordiques | 2–2 |
| 5 | April 14 | Quebec Nordiques | 7–5 | Hartford Whalers | 3–2 |
| 6 | April 16 | Hartford Whalers | 4–5 | Quebec Nordiques | 4–2 |

Adams Division Finals vs. (A2) Montreal Canadiens – Canadiens win 4–3

| Game | Date | Visitor | Score | Home | Series |
|---|---|---|---|---|---|
| 1 | April 20 | Quebec Nordiques | 7–5 | Montreal Canadiens | 1–0 |
| 2 | April 22 | Quebec Nordiques | 2–1 | Montreal Canadiens | 2–0 |
| 3 | April 24 | Montreal Canadiens | 7–2 | Quebec Nordiques | 2–1 |
| 4 | April 26 | Montreal Canadiens | 3–2 | Quebec Nordiques | 2–2 |
| 5 | April 28 | Quebec Nordiques | 2–3 | Montreal Canadiens | 2–3 |
| 6 | April 30 | Montreal Canadiens | 2–3 | Quebec Nordiques | 3–3 |
| 7 | May 2 | Quebec Nordiques | 3–5 | Montreal Canadiens | 3–4 |

Legend: Win Loss

== Transactions ==
The Nordiques made the following transactions during the 1986–87 season.

=== Trades ===
| January 5, 1987 | To Winnipeg Jets 4th round pick in 1989 – Mark Brownschidle | To Quebec Nordiques Bill Derlago |
| January 15, 1987 | To Detroit Red Wings Mark Kumpel; Brent Ashton; Gilbert Delorme | To Quebec Nordiques Basil McRae; John Ogrodnick; Doug Shedden |
| March 5, 1987 | To New York Rangers Pat Price | To Quebec Nordiques Lane Lambert |
| June 12, 1987 | To Washington Capitals 12th round pick in 1987 – Dan Brettschneider; 10th round pick in 1988 – Mark Sorensen | To Quebec Nordiques 9th round pick in 1987 – Ladislav Tresl |
| June 13, 1987 | To Washington Capitals Dale Hunter; Clint Malarchuk | To Quebec Nordiques Gaetan Duchesne; Alan Haworth; 1st round pick in 1987 – Joe Sakic |

=== Free agents ===
| Player | Former team |
| Scott Gordon | Boston College Eagles (NCAA) |
| Marc Fortier | Chicoutimi Saguenéens (QMJHL) |
| Jean-Marc Richard | Chicoutimi Saguenéens (QMJHL) |

| Player | New team |
| Alain Lemieux | Pittsburgh Penguins |

== Draft picks ==
Quebec's draft picks from the 1986 NHL entry draft which was held at the Montreal Forum in Montreal.

| Round | # | Player | Nationality | College/junior/club team (league) |
|---|---|---|---|---|
| 1 | 18 | Ken McRae | Canada | Sudbury Wolves (OHL) |
| 2 | 39 | Jean-Marc Routhier | Canada | Hull Olympiques (QMJHL) |
| 2 | 41 | Stephane Guerard | Canada | Shawinigan Cataractes (QMJHL) |
| 4 | 81 | Ron Tugnutt | Canada | Peterborough Petes (OHL) |
| 5 | 102 | Gerald Bzdel | Canada | Regina Pats (WHL) |
| 6 | 117 | Scott White | Canada | Michigan Tech Huskies (NCAA) |
| 6 | 123 | Morgan Samuelsson | Sweden | Bodens BK (Sweden) |
| 7 | 134 | Mark Vermette | Canada | Lake Superior State (NCAA) |
| 7 | 144 | Jean-Francois Nault | Canada | Granby Bisons (QMJHL) |
| 8 | 165 | Keith Miller | Canada | Guelph Platers (OHL) |
| 9 | 186 | Pierre Millier | Canada | Chicoutimi Saguenéens (QMJHL) |
| 10 | 207 | Chris Lappin | United States | Canterbury School (USHS) |
| 11 | 228 | Martin Latreille | Canada | Laval Titan (QMJHL) |
| 12 | 249 | Sean Boudreault | United States | Mount St. Charles Academy (USHS) |
| S2 | 21 | Mike Natyshak | Canada | Bowling Green State University (CCHA) |

== Awards and records ==
- Michel Goulet, left wing, NHL First Team All-Star
