= 1986–87 Philadelphia Flyers season =

NHL hockey team season

1986–87 Philadelphia Flyers
- Wales Conference champions
- Patrick Division champions
- Division: 1st Patrick
- Conference: 1st Wales
- 1986–87 record: 46–26–8
- Home record: 29–9–2
- Road record: 17–17–6
- Goals for: 310 (4th)
- Goals against: 245 (2nd)

Team information
- General manager: Bob Clarke
- Coach: Mike Keenan
- Captain: Dave Poulin
- Alternate captains: Mark Howe; Brad Marsh
- Arena: Spectrum
- Average attendance: 17,212
- Minor league affiliates: Hershey Bears; Kalamazoo Wings

Team leaders
- Goals: Tim Kerr (58)
- Assists: Dave Poulin (45)
- Points: Tim Kerr (95)
- Penalty minutes: Rick Tocchet (288)
- Plus/minus: Mark Howe (+57)
- Wins: Ron Hextall (37)
- Goals against average: Bob Froese (2.67)

The 1986–87 Philadelphia Flyers season was the franchise's 20th season in the National Hockey League (NHL). The Flyers reached the Stanley Cup Final but lost to the Edmonton Oilers in seven games.

== Regular season ==
With the previous Spring's upset loss to the Rangers fresh on their minds, the Flyers got off to a 6–0–0 start to the season, and only lost road games to the Islanders and Penguins in an 8–2–0 October.

Goaltender Ron Hextall made his professional debut on opening night, October 9, and held Edmonton to one goal in a 2–1 victory, and only improved from there, being named NHL Rookie of the Month for October and November.

Things began to click for the club as a whole in November as Brad McCrimmon returned from his suspension over a contract dispute and the emergence of Hextall forced Bob Froese into a back-up role. In the first two months of the season, only the Penguins challenged the Flyers' grip on the top spot in the division, actually starting the year 7–0–0 and topping Philly on October 25 but fading by the end of November.

Brian Propp scored four goals in a 7–1 win over St. Louis on December 2, but three games later he was lost for two months after suffering a serious knee injury against the Oilers. Froese was dealt to the New York Rangers for Kjell Samuelsson on December 18 and later that same night routing the Islanders 9–4 which saw Poulin and Kerr record three-goal games. The record reached 25–7–2 on December 21 after a 7–6 comeback win over the Blues, but during the next game in Buffalo, Ilkka Sinisalo went down with a knee injury and the team lost four in a row on a holiday road trip (Sabres, Canucks, Oilers, Kings).

A seven-game unbeaten streak in January put the Flyers at 31–11–3, three points ahead of the Oilers for best record in the NHL, but injuries began putting a strain on the ranks. With Propp, Sinisalo, Mark Howe, and Ron Sutter all suffering through long-term problems, plus minor injuries cropping up, the team sputtered late, going 15–15–5 over the remainder of the schedule.

February 1 saw the Flyers routed 8–4 in Toronto, part of another four-game losing string before the break for Rendez-vous '87. Home defeats to the Rangers (6–1 on March 12), Kings (5–2 on March 19) and Detroit (5–1 on March 28) followed. A 9–5 home loss on the season's final day to the New York Islanders was no indication of the memorable playoff run to come.

Twice within a span of one week in late January, the Flyers engaged in bench-clearing brawls. The first came in a 3–1 loss to the Islanders at home on January 18 which cost head coach Keenan a one-game suspension. Oddly enough, the second occurred during the game Keenan was suspended for, a 4–3 setback to the Devils at the Meadowlands January 24. That fracas, which came after the final buzzer, saw Hextall pummel Devils goaltender Alain Chevrier among several other battles.

The Flyers captured a third-straight Patrick Division title and Hextall became the third Flyers goaltender to win the Vezina, joining Bernie Parent and Pelle Lindbergh.

=== Season standings ===
Patrick Division
	GP	W	L	T	GF	GA	Pts
**Philadelphia Flyers**	80	46	26	8	310	245	100
**Washington Capitals**	80	38	32	10	285	278	86
**New York Islanders**	80	35	33	12	279	281	82
**New York Rangers**	80	34	38	8	307	323	76
Pittsburgh Penguins	80	30	38	12	297	290	72
New Jersey Devils	80	29	45	6	293	368	64

Note: GP = Games played, W = Wins, L = Losses, T = Ties, Pts = Points, GF = Goals for, GA = Goals against
Note: Teams that qualified for the playoffs are highlighted in bold.

=== Record vs. opponents ===
Patrick Division record vs. opponents

==== Vs. Wales Conference ====
**Vs. Patrick Division**

1986–87 NHL records
Team	**NJD**	**NYI**	**NYR**	**PHI**	**PIT**	**WSH**	**Total**
New Jersey	—	2–5	4–3	2–4–1	4–3	1–6	13–21–1
N.Y. Islanders	5–2	—	3–3–1	3–4	5–0–2	2–3–2	18–12–2
N.Y. Rangers	3–4	3–3–1	—	4–3	3–2–2	4–3	17–15–3
Philadelphia	4–2–1	4–3	3–4	—	4–1–2	5–1–1	20–11–4
Pittsburgh	3–4	0–5–2	2–3–2	1–4–2	—	4–3	10–19–6
Washington	6–1	3–2–2	3–4	1–5–1	3–4	—	16–16–3

**Vs. Adams Division**

1986–87 NHL records
Team	**BOS**	**BUF**	**HFD**	**MTL**	**QUE**	**Total**
New Jersey	1–1–1	1–2	1–1–1	1–2	0–1–2	4–7–4
N.Y. Islanders	0–2–1	1–1–1	1–2	1–1–1	2–1	5–7–3
N.Y. Rangers	2–1	2–1	0–3	0–2–1	2–1	6–8–1
Philadelphia	2–1	2–1	1–2	2–0–1	2–0–1	9–4–2
Pittsburgh	1–2	2–0–1	0–3	1–1–1	3–0	7–6–2
Washington	1–1–1	1–2	1–2	3–0	0–2–1	6–7–2

==== Vs. Campbell Conference ====
**Vs. Norris Division**

1986–87 NHL records
Team	**CHI**	**DET**	**MIN**	**STL**	**TOR**	**Total**
New Jersey	1–2	2–1	1–2	2–1	1–2	7–8–0
N.Y. Islanders	1–2	2–1	3–0	1–1–1	2–1	9–5–1
N.Y. Rangers	1–1–1	1–2	1–1–1	1–2	1–1–1	5–7–3
Philadelphia	2–0–1	2–1	1–2	3–0	1–1–1	9–4–2
Pittsburgh	2–1	1–2	3–0	1–0–2	1–2	8–5–2
Washington	1–1–1	2–0–1	2–0–1	2–0–1	2–1	9–2–4

**Vs. Smythe Division**

1986–87 NHL records
Team	**CGY**	**EDM**	**LAK**	**VAN**	**WIN**	**Total**
New Jersey	1–2	1–2	1–2	2–0–1	0–3	5–9–1
N.Y. Islanders	0–2–1	0–2–1	1–2	1–2	1–1–1	3–9–2
N.Y. Rangers	1–2	0–3	2–0–1	2–1	1–2	6–8–1
Philadelphia	1–2	2–1	1–2	2–1	2–1	8–7–0
Pittsburgh	1–2	1–2	1–2	1–0–2	1–2	5–8–2
Washington	1–2	2–1	0–3	3–0	1–1–1	7–7–1

== Playoffs ==
The Flyers gained revenge on the New York Rangers by beating them in six games, as well as surviving a tough seven-game test from a gritty New York Islanders' club. By the time the Flyers defeated the defending Stanley Cup champion Montreal Canadiens in six to win the Wales Conference and return to the Stanley Cup Final, the Flyers had again been decimated by injuries, including losing Tim Kerr for the remainder of the playoffs. As a result, the Flyers lost in heartbreaking fashion to the Edmonton Oilers in seven tough, hard-fought games. Hextall was voted playoff MVP, the second such time a Flyer won the Conn Smythe Trophy despite being on the losing team, the other being Reggie Leach in 1976.

== Schedule and results ==
=== Regular season ===
1986–87 regular season
October: 8–2–0, 16 points (home: 6–0–0; road: 2–2–0)

Game	Date	Score	Opponent	Decision	Record	Points	Recap
1	October 9	2–1	Edmonton Oilers	Hextall	1–0–0	2	W
2	October 11	6–1	@ Washington Capitals	Hextall	2–0–0	4	W
3	October 16	6–2	Vancouver Canucks	Froese	3–0–0	6	W
4	October 18	6–3	@ Hartford Whalers	Hextall	4–0–0	8	W
5	October 19	3–1	Winnipeg Jets	Hextall	5–0–0	10	W
6	October 23	5–3	Pittsburgh Penguins	Froese	6–0–0	12	W
7	October 25	2–4	@ Pittsburgh Penguins	Hextall	6–1–0	12	L
8	October 26	4–1	Minnesota North Stars	Hextall	7–1–0	14	W
9	October 28	1–2	@ New York Islanders	Hextall	7–2–0	14	L
10	October 30	6–3	Quebec Nordiques	Hextall	8–2–0	16	W

November: 9–2–2, 20 points (home: 7–1–0; road: 2–1–2)

Game	Date	Score	Opponent	Decision	Record	Points	Recap
11	November 1	4–2	Boston Bruins	Hextall	9–2–0	18	W
12	November 4	7–1	New Jersey Devils	Hextall	10–2–0	20	W
13	November 6	5–5 OT	@ New Jersey Devils	Hextall	10–2–1	21	T
14	November 8	2–3	New York Rangers	Hextall	10–3–1	21	L
15	November 13	7–5	Detroit Red Wings	Hextall	11–3–1	23	W
16	November 14	1–2	@ New York Rangers	Resch	11–4–1	23	L
17	November 16	6–2	Washington Capitals	Hextall	12–4–1	25	W
18	November 19	2–2 OT	@ Toronto Maple Leafs	Hextall	12–4–2	26	T
19	November 20	5–1	Chicago Blackhawks	Hextall	13–4–2	28	W
20	November 22	6–1	Toronto Maple Leafs	Hextall	14–4–2	30	W
21	November 26	4–2	Montreal Canadiens	Hextall	15–4–2	32	W
22	November 28	4–2	@ Washington Capitals	Hextall	16–4–2	34	W
23	November 29	6–5	@ New York Islanders	Hextall	17–4–2	36	W

December: 8–7–0, 16 points (home: 6–1–0; road: 2–6–0)

Game	Date	Score	Opponent	Decision	Record	Points	Recap
24	December 2	7–1	St. Louis Blues	Resch	18–4–2	38	W
25	December 4	1–2	Hartford Whalers	Hextall	18–5–2	38	L
26	December 6	0–5	@ Boston Bruins	Hextall	18–6–2	38	L
27	December 7	5–2	Edmonton Oilers	Hextall	19–6–2	40	W
28	December 9	6–3	Vancouver Canucks	Froese	20–6–2	42	W
29	December 11	5–3	Calgary Flames	Hextall	21–6–2	44	W
30	December 13	4–5	@ Minnesota North Stars	Hextall	21–7–2	44	L
31	December 14	4–1	@ Winnipeg Jets	Hextall	22–7–2	46	W
32	December 18	9–4	New York Islanders	Hextall	23–7–2	48	W
33	December 20	6–4	@ Pittsburgh Penguins	Hextall	24–7–2	50	W
34	December 21	7–6	St. Louis Blues	Resch	25–7–2	52	W
35	December 23	1–2	@ Buffalo Sabres	Hextall	25–8–2	52	L
36	December 27	2–4	@ Vancouver Canucks	Hextall	25–9–2	52	L
37	December 28	4–6	@ Edmonton Oilers	Hextall	25–10–2	52	L
38	December 30	1–4	@ Los Angeles Kings	Resch	25–11–2	52	L

January: 9–3–2, 20 points (home: 4–2–1; road: 5–1–1)

Game	Date	Score	Opponent	Decision	Record	Points	Recap
39	January 3	4–1	@ Washington Capitals	Hextall	26–11–2	54	W
40	January 6	4–0	New Jersey Devils	Hextall	27–11–2	56	W
41	January 7	6–3	@ New York Rangers	Hextall	28–11–2	58	W
42	January 10	5–4	@ Boston Bruins	Resch	29–11–2	60	W
43	January 11	2–2 OT	Washington Capitals	Hextall	29–11–3	61	T
44	January 15	6–3	Montreal Canadiens	Hextall	30–11–3	63	W
45	January 17	4–2	@ New York Islanders	Resch	31–11–3	65	W
46	January 18	1–3	New York Islanders	Hextall	31–12–3	65	L
47	January 21	5–5 OT	@ Chicago Blackhawks	Hextall	31–12–4	66	T
48	January 23	4–3	Chicago Blackhawks	Hextall	32–12–4	68	W
49	January 24	3–4	@ New Jersey Devils	Resch	32–13–4	68	L
50	January 28	7–4	@ Buffalo Sabres	Hextall	33–13–4	70	W
51	January 29	5–3	Pittsburgh Penguins	Hextall	34–13–4	72	W
52	January 31	1–3	New York Rangers	Hextall	34–14–4	72	L

February: 3–5–1, 7 points (home: 0–1–1; road: 3–4–0)

Game	Date	Score	Opponent	Decision	Record	Points	Recap
53	February 2	4–8	@ Toronto Maple Leafs	Resch	34–15–4	72	L
54	February 4	3–5	@ Winnipeg Jets	Hextall	34–16–4	72	L
55	February 7	2–3	@ New Jersey Devils	Hextall	34–17–4	72	L
56	February 14	4–2	@ St. Louis Blues	Hextall	35–17–4	74	W
57	February 16	0–5	Calgary Flames	Hextall	35–18–4	74	L
58	February 17	3–2	@ New York Islanders	Hextall	36–18–4	76	W
59	February 19	4–4 OT	Pittsburgh Penguins	Hextall	36–18–5	77	T
60	February 21	4–2	@ Los Angeles Kings	Hextall	37–18–5	79	W
61	February 26	3–4	@ Calgary Flames	Hextall	37–19–5	79	L

March: 8–5–3, 19 points (home: 6–3–0; road: 2–2–3)

Game	Date	Score	Opponent	Decision	Record	Points	Recap
62	March 1	4–5	@ Minnesota North Stars	Hextall	37–20–5	79	L
63	March 3	4–2	Buffalo Sabres	Hextall	38–20–5	81	W
64	March 5	4–2	Washington Capitals	Hextall	39–20–5	83	W
65	March 7	3–5	@ Hartford Whalers	Hextall	39–21–5	83	L
66	March 8	7–3	New Jersey Devils	Resch	40–21–5	85	W
67	March 11	6–4	@ New Jersey Devils	Hextall	41–21–5	87	W
68	March 12	1–6	New York Rangers	Hextall	41–22–5	87	L
69	March 14	3–3 OT	@ Montreal Canadiens	Hextall	41–22–6	88	T
70	March 15	5–2	@ New York Rangers	Resch	42–22–6	90	W
71	March 17	4–1	New York Rangers	Hextall	43–22–6	92	W
72	March 19	2–5	Los Angeles Kings	Hextall	43–23–6	92	L
73	March 21	2–2 OT	@ Quebec Nordiques	Resch	43–23–7	93	T
74	March 22	3–1	Pittsburgh Penguins	Hextall	44–23–7	95	W
75	March 24	3–3 OT	@ Pittsburgh Penguins	Resch	44–23–8	96	T
76	March 26	3–2 OT	Quebec Nordiques	Hextall	45–23–8	98	W
77	March 28	1–5	Detroit Red Wings	Hextall	45–24–8	98	L

April: 1–2–0, 2 points (home: 0–1–0; road: 1–1–0)

Game	Date	Score	Opponent	Decision	Record	Points	Recap
78	April 1	2–1	@ Detroit Red Wings	Hextall	46–24–8	100	W
79	April 4	2–3 OT	@ Washington Capitals	Resch	46–25–8	100	L
80	April 5	5–9	New York Islanders	Hextall	46–26–8	100	L

Legend: W Win (2 points) L Loss (0 points) T Tie (1 point)

=== Playoffs ===
1987 Stanley Cup playoffs
Patrick Division semifinals vs. New York Rangers – Flyers win 4–2

Game	Date	Score	Opponent	Decision	Series	Recap
1	April 8	0–3	New York Rangers	Hextall	Rangers lead 1–0	L
2	April 9	8–3	New York Rangers	Hextall	Series tied 1–1	W
3	April 11	3–0	@ New York Rangers	Hextall	Flyers lead 2–1	W
4	April 12	3–6	@ New York Rangers	Hextall	Series tied 2–2	L
5	April 14	3–1	New York Rangers	Hextall	Flyers lead 3–2	W
6	April 16	5–0	@ New York Rangers	Hextall	Flyers win 4–2	W

Patrick Division finals vs. New York Islanders – Flyers win 4–3

Game	Date	Score	Opponent	Decision	Series	Recap
1	April 20	4–2	New York Islanders	Hextall	Flyers lead 1–0	W
2	April 22	1–2	New York Islanders	Hextall	Series tied 1–1	L
3	April 24	4–1	@ New York Islanders	Hextall	Flyers lead 2–1	W
4	April 26	6–4	@ New York Islanders	Hextall	Flyers lead 3–1	W
5	April 28	1–2	New York Islanders	Hextall	Flyers lead 3–2	L
6	April 30	2–4	@ New York Islanders	Hextall	Series tied 3–3	L
7	May 2	5–1	New York Islanders	Hextall	Flyers win 4–3	W

Wales Conference finals vs. Montreal Canadiens – Flyers win 4–2

Game	Date	Score	Opponent	Decision	Series	Recap
1	May 4	4–3 OT	Montreal Canadiens	Hextall	Flyers lead 1–0	W
2	May 6	2–5	Montreal Canadiens	Hextall	Series tied 1–1	L
3	May 8	4–3	@ Montreal Canadiens	Hextall	Flyers lead 2–1	W
4	May 10	6–3	@ Montreal Canadiens	Hextall	Flyers lead 3–1	W
5	May 12	2–5	Montreal Canadiens	Hextall	Flyers lead 3–2	L
6	May 14	4–3	@ Montreal Canadiens	Hextall	Flyers win 4–2	W

Stanley Cup Final vs. Edmonton Oilers – Oilers win 4–3

Game	Date	Score	Opponent	Decision	Series	Recap
1	May 17	2–4	@ Edmonton Oilers	Hextall	Oilers lead 1–0	L
2	May 20	2–3 OT	@ Edmonton Oilers	Hextall	Oilers lead 2–0	L
3	May 22	5–3	Edmonton Oilers	Hextall	Oilers lead 2–1	W
4	May 24	1–4	Edmonton Oilers	Hextall	Oilers lead 3–1	L
5	May 26	4–3	@ Edmonton Oilers	Hextall	Oilers lead 3–2	W
6	May 28	3–2	Edmonton Oilers	Hextall	Series tied 3–3	W
7	May 31	1–3	@ Edmonton Oilers	Hextall	Oilers win 4–3	L

Legend: W Win L Loss

== Player statistics ==
=== Scoring ===
- Position abbreviations: C = Center; D = Defense; G = Goaltender; LW = Left wing; RW = Right wing
- † = Joined team via a transaction (e.g., trade, waivers, signing) during the season. Stats reflect time with the Flyers only.
- ‡ = Left team via a transaction (e.g., trade, waivers, release) during the season. Stats reflect time with the Flyers only.

No.	Player	Pos	Regular season						Playoffs					
No.	Player	Pos	GP	G	A	Pts	+/-	PIM	GP	G	A	Pts	+/-	PIM
12	Tim Kerr	RW	75	58	37	95	38	57	12	8	5	13	3	2
25	Peter Zezel	C	71	33	39	72	21	71	25	3	10	13	6	10
20	Dave Poulin	C	75	25	45	70	47	53	15	3	3	6	1	14
26	Brian Propp	LW	53	31	36	67	39	45	26	12	16	28	11	10
2	Mark Howe	D	69	15	43	58	57	37	26	2	10	12	14	4
9	Pelle Eklund	C	72	14	41	55	−2	2	26	7	20	27	11	2
22	Rick Tocchet	RW	69	21	28	49	16	288	26	11	10	21	7	72
32	Murray Craven	LW	77	19	30	49	1	38	12	3	1	4	−4	9
3	Doug Crossman	D	78	9	31	40	18	29	26	4	14	18	0	31
10	Brad McCrimmon	D	71	10	29	39	45	52	26	3	5	8	9	30
19	Scott Mellanby	RW	71	11	21	32	8	94	24	5	5	10	7	46
24	Derrick Smith	LW	71	11	21	32	−4	34	26	6	4	10	3	26
23	Ilkka Sinisalo	LW	42	10	21	31	14	8	18	5	1	6	−6	4
14	Ron Sutter	C	39	10	17	27	10	69	16	1	7	8	−3	12
18	Lindsay Carson	LW	71	11	15	26	−2	141	24	3	5	8	3	22
15	J. J. Daigneault	D	77	6	16	22	12	56	9	1	0	1	−1	0
8	Brad Marsh	D	77	2	9	11	9	124	26	3	4	7	2	16
21	Dave Brown	RW	62	7	3	10	−7	274	26	1	2	3	1	59
28	Kjell Samuelsson†	D	46	1	6	7	−9	86	26	0	4	4	4	25
27	Ron Hextall	G	66	0	6	6		104	26	0	1	1		43
11	Glen Seabrooke	C	10	1	4	5	2	2	—	—	—	—	—	—
17	Ed Hospodar	D	45	2	2	4	−8	136	5	0	0	0	0	2
7	Brian Dobbin	RW	12	2	1	3	2	14	—	—	—	—	—	—
29	Daryl Stanley	D	33	1	2	3	6	76	13	0	0	0	−3	9
36 (Note: Hill wore number 28 in his first two games.)	Al Hill	LW	7	0	2	2	1	4	9	2	1	3	2	0
42	Don Nachbaur	C	23	0	2	2	1	87	7	1	1	2	2	15
41	John Stevens	D	6	0	2	2	0	14	—	—	—	—	—	—
37	Mark Freer	C	1	0	1	1	1	0	—	—	—	—	—	—
36	Ray Allison	RW	2	0	0	0	−2	0	—	—	—	—	—	—
34	Craig Berube	LW	7	0	0	0	2	57	5	0	0	0	0	17
6	Jeff Chychrun	D	1	0	0	0	0	4	—	—	—	—	—	—
35	Bob Froese‡	G	3	0	0	0		0	—	—	—	—	—	—
34	Jere Gillis	LW	1	0	0	0	0	0	—	—	—	—	—	—
5	Kerry Huffman	D	9	0	0	0	5	2	—	—	—	—	—	—
36	Kevin McCarthy	D	2	0	0	0	−1	0	—	—	—	—	—	—
33	Glenn Resch	G	17	0	0	0		0	2	0	0	0		0
5	Steve Smith	D	2	0	0	0	−2	6	—	—	—	—	—	—
40	Greg Smyth	D	1	0	0	0	−2	0	1	0	0	0	0	2
44	Mike Stothers	D	2	0	0	0	0	4	2	0	0	0	1	7
37	Tim Tookey	C	2	0	0	0	0	0	10	1	3	4	1	2

=== Goaltending ===
- ‡ = Left team via a transaction (e.g., trade, waivers, release) during the season. Stats reflect time with the Flyers only.

No.	Player	Regular season											Playoffs									
No.	Player	GP	GS	W	L	T	SA	GA	GAA	SV%	SO	TOI	GP	GS	W	L	SA	GA	GAA	SV%	SO	TOI
27	Ron Hextall	66	66	37	21	6	1929	190	3.01	.902	1	3,792	26	26	15	11	769	71	2.76	.908	2	1,542
33	Glenn Resch	17	11	6	5	2	435	42	2.92	.903	0	864	2	0	0	0	11	1	1.96	.909	0	31
35	Bob Froese‡	3	3	3	0	0	88	8	2.67	.909	0	180	—	—	—	—	—	—	—	—	—	—

== Awards and records ==
=== Awards ===
Type	Award/honor	Recipient	Ref
League (annual)	Conn Smythe Trophy	Ron Hextall	
League (annual)	Frank J. Selke Trophy	Dave Poulin	
League (annual)	NHL All-Rookie Team	Ron Hextall (Goaltender)	
League (annual)	NHL first All-Star team	Ron Hextall (Goaltender)	
League (annual)	NHL first All-Star team	Mark Howe (Defense)	
League (annual)	NHL second All-Star team	Tim Kerr (Right wing)	
League (annual)	Vezina Trophy	Ron Hextall	
League (in-season)	NHL Player of the Month	Ron Hextall (October)	
League (in-season)	NHL Player of the Week	Peter Zezel (January 12)	
League (in-season)	NHL Rookie of the Month	Ron Hextall (October)	
League (in-season)	NHL Rookie of the Month	Ron Hextall (November)	
League (in-season)	Rendez-vous '87 selection	Ron Hextall (Note: Did not play)	
League (in-season)	Rendez-vous '87 selection	Mark Howe (Note: Howe was voted to the starting lineup but did not play.)	
League (in-season)	Rendez-vous '87 selection	Tim Kerr	
League (in-season)	Rendez-vous '87 selection	Dave Poulin	
Team	Barry Ashbee Trophy	Mark Howe	
Team	Bobby Clarke Trophy	Ron Hextall	
Team	Class Guy Award	Glenn Resch	

=== Records ===
Among the team records set during the 1986–87 season was the 26 seconds it took to score the fastest two shorthanded goals in team history on November 6. On November 13, Murray Craven tied the team record for most goals in a single period (3). On November 20, Tim Kerr tied team records for most goals (4) and powerplay goals (3) in a single game. About two weeks later Brian Propp also tied the single game goals record on December 2. Kerr's .77 goals per game average is a franchise single season high while the team's 22 shorthanded goals on the season is a team record.

During game two of their division semifinal series against the New York Rangers, the Flyers tied the team record for most goals in a single period (5). During game seven of their division final series against the New York Islanders, the Flyers tied a team record for shorthanded goals in a game (2) and set a team record for shorthanded goals during a single period (2, later tied). During game five of the Stanley Cup Final against the Edmonton Oilers, Propp tied a team record for most assists (4) during a playoff game.

A number of single playoff season team records were set during the 1987 Stanley Cup playoffs. The Flyers set playoff highs for games played (26), wins (15), road wins (8), losses (11), home losses (6), goals scored (85), and goals against (73). Among the skaters setting single season marks were Pelle Eklund for assists (20), Doug Crossman for points by a defenseman (18, later tied), and Propp for shots on goal (104). Rookie Ron Hextall set the goaltending marks for games played (26, tied for the NHL record), wins (15), losses (11), minutes played (1,542), and goals against (71). Hextall’s 43 penalty minutes is a single playoff season NHL record for goaltenders.

=== Milestones ===
Milestone	Player	Date	Ref
First game	Ron Hextall	October 9, 1986	
First game	Kerry Huffman	October 9, 1986	
First game	Jeff Chychrun	December 2, 1986	
First game	Brian Dobbin	January 10, 1987	
First game	Glen Seabrooke	January 17, 1987	
First game	Mark Freer	January 28, 1987	
First game	John Stevens	January 28, 1987	
First game	Greg Smyth	February 2, 1987	
First game	Craig Berube	March 22, 1987	

== Transactions ==
The Flyers were involved in the following transactions from May 25, 1986, the day after the deciding game of the 1986 Stanley Cup Final, through May 31, 1987, the day of the deciding game of the 1987 Stanley Cup Final.

=== Trades ===
Date	Details		Ref
June 6, 1986	To Philadelphia Flyers: J. J. Daigneault; 2nd-round pick in 1986; 5th-round pick in 1987	To Vancouver Canucks: Dave Richter; Rich Sutter; Vancouver's 3rd-round pick in 1986	
June 21, 1986	To Philadelphia Flyers: 2nd-round pick in 1987	To Quebec Nordiques: 2nd-round pick in 1986	
June 21, 1986	To Philadelphia Flyers: Mike Murray	To New York Islanders: 5th-round pick in 1986	
October 30, 1986	To Philadelphia Flyers: Dominic Campedelli	To Montreal Canadiens: Andre Villeneuve	
December 18, 1986	To Philadelphia Flyers: Kjell Samuelsson; 2nd-round pick in 1989	To New York Rangers: Bob Froese	
March 9, 1987	To Philadelphia Flyers: Jeff Brubaker	To Edmonton Oilers: Dominic Campedelli	

=== Players acquired ===
Date	Player	Former team	Term	Via	Ref
June 12, 1986	Ed Hospodar	Minnesota North Stars	1 year (Note: Option for second year)	Free agency	
June 30, 1986	Mitch Lamoureux	Pittsburgh Penguins		Free agency	
October 1986	Jere Gillis	Vancouver Canucks		Free agency	
October 7, 1986	Mark Freer	Peterborough Petes (OHL)		Free agency	
October 7, 1986	Mike MacWilliam	New Westminster Bruins (WHL)		Free agency	

=== Players lost ===
Date	Player	New team	Via	Ref
June 12, 1986	Thomas Eriksson	Djurgardens IF (SHL)	Free agency (Note: Eriksson retired from the NHL.)	
July 23, 1986	Carl Mokosak	Pittsburgh Penguins	Free agency	
N/A	Bo Berglund	AIK IF (Division 1)	Free agency	

=== Signings ===
Date	Player	Term	Ref
June 1, 1986	Glenn Resch	1-year	
August 18, 1986	Steve Smith		
October 8, 1986	Kerry Huffman	multi-year	
October 21, 1986	Ron Hextall	multi-year extension	
October 29, 1986	Brad McCrimmon	1-year	

== Draft picks ==
Philadelphia's picks at the 1986 NHL entry draft, which was held at the Montreal Forum in Montreal, on June 21, 1986. The Flyers traded their second-round pick, 41st overall, to the Quebec Nordiques for the Nordiques' 1987 second-round pick on June 21, 1986. They also traded their third-round pick, 62nd overall, to the New Jersey Devils for Chico Resch on March 11, 1986, and their fifth-round pick, 104th overall, to the New York Islanders for Mike Murray on June 21, 1986. The Flyers declined to make a selection in the inaugural NHL supplemental draft, which was held September 17, 1986.

Round	Pick	Player	Position	Nationality	Team (league)	Notes
1	20	Kerry Huffman	Defense	Canada	Guelph Platers (OHL)	
2	23	Jukka-Pekka Seppo	Center	Finland	Vasa Sport (Mestis)	(Note: The Flyers traded Paul Guay and their fourth-round pick, 83rd overall, to the Los Angeles Kings for Steve Seguin and the Kings' second-round pick, 23rd overall, on October 11, 1985.)
2	28	Kent Hawley	Center	Canada	Ottawa 67's (OHL)	(Note: The Flyers traded Rich Sutter, Dave Richter, and Vancouver's third-round pick, 49th overall, to the Vancouver Canucks for J. J. Daigneault, the Canucks' second-round pick, 28th overall, and the Canucks' 1987 fifth-round pick on June 6, 1986.)
4	83	Mark Bar	Defense	Canada	Peterborough Petes (OHL)	(Note: The Flyers reacquired their fourth-round pick, 83rd overall, from the Los Angeles Kings for Joe Paterson on December 18, 1985.)
6	125	Steve Scheifele	Right wing	United States	Stratford Cullitons (OPJHL)	
7	146	Sami Wahlsten	Forward	Finland	TPS Turku (SM-liiga)	
8	167	Murray Baron	Defense	Canada	Vernon Lakers (BCJHL)	
9	184	Blaine Rude	Forward	United States	Fergus Falls High School (N. Dakota)	
10	209	Shaun Sabol	Defense	United States	St. Paul Vulcans (USHL)	
11	230	Brett Lawrence	Right wing	United States	Rochester Junior Americans	
12	251	Dan Stephano	Goaltender	United States	Northwood School (N.Y.)	

== Farm teams ==
The Flyers were affiliated with the Hershey Bears of the AHL and the Kalamazoo Wings of the IHL.
