= 1986–87 Chicago Blackhawks season =

National Hockey League team season

1986–87 Chicago Blackhawks
- Division: 3rd Norris
- Conference: 6th Campbell
- 1986–87 record: 29–37–14
- Home record: 18–13–9
- Road record: 11–24–5
- Goals for: 290
- Goals against: 310

Team information
- General manager: Bob Pulford
- Coach: Bob Pulford
- Captain: Darryl Sutter
- Arena: Chicago Stadium

Team leaders
- Goals: Denis Savard (40)
- Assists: Steve Larmer (56)
- Points: Denis Savard (90)
- Penalty minutes: Al Secord (196)
- Plus/minus: Steve Larmer (18)
- Wins: Bob Sauvé (19)
- Goals against average: Bob Sauvé (3.60)

The 1986–87 Chicago Blackhawks season was the 61st season of operation of the Chicago Blackhawks in the National Hockey League (NHL). A notable change happened for the team in the off-season as they had previously been known as the "Black Hawks", they removed the space from the name and have been written as the "Blackhawks" ever since.

== Offseason ==
The 1986–87 Chicago Blackhawks were coming off a year in which they won the Norris Division then somehow got swept in the first round of the playoffs by the Toronto Maple Leafs.

At the 1986 NHL entry draft, the Blackhawks selected forward Everett Sanipass with their first round, 14th overall pick. Sanipass played with the Verdun Junior Canadiens of the QMJHL in the 1985–86 season, scoring 28 goals and 94 points in 67 games, while amassing 320 penalty minutes, sixth highest total in the league. Other notable players selected by the team were defenseman Frantisek Kucera and center Mike Hudson.

On August 27, the Blackhawks signed defenseman Gary Nylund to a three-year contract worth approximately $620,000. Nylund, who would turn 23 years old early in the season, appeared in 79 games with the Toronto Maple Leafs in 1985–86, scoring two goals and 18 points while accumulating 180 penalty minutes. In 10 playoff games, he had two assists. The Blackhawks then sent Ken Yaremchuk, Jerome Dupont and their fourth-round draft pick in the 1987 NHL entry draft to the Maple Leafs as compensation for signing Nylund.

Due to a back injury, defenseman Behn Wilson would miss the entire 1986–87 season.

Forward Tom Lysiak, who had been with the club since 1979, announced his retirement during the off-season.

== Regular season ==
The Hawks struggled to start the season, posting a record of 4–12–5 in their first 21 games, as the club was fighting with the Minnesota North Stars for the fourth and final playoff position in the Norris Division. The Blackhawks would continue to slide to a record of 8-17-6 after 31 games, putting them in last place. The team broke out of their season-long slump, winning nine of their next 12 games, putting their record to 17–20–6, and into a tie for first place in the Norris Division with 40 points. The Blackhawks would continue to hover just under the .500 mark, peaking at two games under with a 27–29–10 record following a four-game winning streak in March, sitting in second place in the division. A late-season slump brought the Hawks' final record to 29–37–14, earning 72 points and third place in the division, as they qualified for the post-season for the 18th consecutive season. Their 72 points were their lowest total since the 1983–84 when the Hawks finished with 68 points.

Offensively, Chicago was led by Denis Savard, who in 70 games, scored 40 goals and 90 points. Wayne Presley, in his first full NHL season, broke out with 32 goals, which was the second-highest total on the team, while earning 61 points in 80 games. Steve Larmer had 28 goals, 84 points, and a team-high +20 rating in 80 games. Troy Murray scored 28 goals and 71 points in 77 games. Al Secord managed to score 29 goals and 58 points in 77 games while leading the Hawks with 196 penalty minutes, and Eddie Olczyk had a disappointing season by his standards, scoring 16 goals and 51 points in 79 games.

On defense, Doug Wilson led the way with 16 goals and 48 points in 69 games. Bob Murray scored six goals and 44 points in 79 games, while newcomer, Gary Nylund had seven goals and 27 points, as well as 190 penalty minutes, in 80 games.

In goal, Bob Sauve played the majority of the minutes, going 19–19–5 with a 3.59 GAA and a .894 save percentage, while earning the only shutout the club had during the season in 46 games. Murray Bannerman backed him up, and had a 9–18–8 record with a 4.14 GAA and a .873 save percentage in 39 games.

=== Final standings ===
Norris Division
	GP	W	L	T	GF	GA	Pts
**St. Louis Blues**	80	32	33	15	281	293	79
**Detroit Red Wings**	80	34	36	10	260	274	78
**Chicago Blackhawks**	80	29	37	14	290	310	72
**Toronto Maple Leafs**	80	32	42	6	286	319	70
Minnesota North Stars	80	30	40	10	296	314	70

Note: GP = Games played, W = Wins, L = Losses, T = Ties, Pts = Points, GF = Goals for, GA = Goals against
Note: Teams that qualified for the playoffs are highlighted in bold.

=== Record vs. opponents ===
Norris Division record vs. opponents

==== Vs. Campbell Conference ====
**Vs. Norris Division**

1986–87 NHL records
Team	**CHI**	**DET**	**MIN**	**STL**	**TOR**	**Total**
Chicago	—	3–4–1	2–4–2	1–3–4	4–4	**10–15–7**
Detroit	4–3–1	—	7–0–1	3–4–1	2–5–1	**16–12–4**
Minnesota	4–2–2	0–7–1	—	2–5–1	6–2	**12–16–4**
St. Louis	3–1–4	4–3–1	5–2–1	—	5–2–1	**17–8–7**
Toronto	4–4	5–2–1	2–6	2–5–1	—	**13–17–2**

**Vs. Smythe Division**

1986–87 NHL records
Team	**CGY**	**EDM**	**LAK**	**VAN**	**WIN**	**Total**
Chicago	0–3	2–1	1–1–1	1–1–1	3–0	**7–6–2**
Detroit	2–1	0–3	0–3	2–1	1–1–1	**5–9–1**
Minnesota	1–1–1	0–2–1	2–0–1	3–0	1–2	**7–5–3**
St. Louis	2–1	0–3	1–1–1	0–2–1	0–1–2	**3–8–4**
Toronto	1–2	1–2	1–1–1	1–2	2–1	**6–8–1**

**Vs. Wales Conference**

**Vs. Adams Division**

1986–87 NHL records
Team	**BOS**	**BUF**	**HFD**	**MTL**	**QUE**	**Total**
Chicago	1–1–1	1–2	2–1	0–2–1	1–2	**5–8–2**
Detroit	2–0–1	0–2–1	1–1–1	1–1–1	2–1	**6–5–4**
Minnesota	0–3	3–0	2–1	1–2	0–2–1	**6–8–1**
St. Louis	1–2	2–1	1–2	1–2	3–0	**8–7–0**
Toronto	1–2	2–0–1	1–2	1–2	0–3	**5–9–1**

**Vs. Patrick Division**

1986–87 NHL records
Team	**NJD**	**NYI**	**NYR**	**PHI**	**PIT**	**WSH**	**Total**
Chicago	2–1	2–1	1–1–1	0–2–1	1–2	1–1–1	**7–8–3**
Detroit	1–2	1–2	2–1	1–2	2–1	0–2–1	**7–10–1**
Minnesota	2–1	0–3	1–1–1	2–1	0–3	0–2–1	**5–11–2**
St. Louis	1–2	1–1–1	2–1	0–3	0–1–2	0–2–1	**4–10–4**
Toronto	2–1	1–2	1–1–1	1–1–1	2–1	1–2	**8–8–2**

== Schedule and results ==
1986–87 regular season
October

Game	Result	Date	Score	Opponent	GWG/GTG	Record
1	W	October 9, 1986	3–2	New York Islanders (1986–87)	Steve Larmer	1–0–0
2	L	October 11, 1986	3–4	@ Detroit Red Wings (1986–87)	Steve Yzerman	1–1–0
3	L	October 12, 1986	1–4	Pittsburgh Penguins (1986–87)	Mario Lemieux	1–2–0
4	T	October 15, 1986	5–5 OT	New York Rangers (1986–87)	Walt Poddubny	1–2–1
5	L	October 18, 1986	2–3	@ Toronto Maple Leafs (1986–87)	Al Iafrate	1–3–1
6	L	October 19, 1986	5–8	Minnesota North Stars (1986–87)	Keith Acton	1–4–1
7	L	October 21, 1986	1–9	@ Edmonton Oilers (1986–87)	Wayne Gretzky	1–5–1
8	T	October 24, 1986	2–2 OT	@ Vancouver Canucks (1986–87)	Rich Sutter	1–5–2
9	W	October 26, 1986	8–4	@ Winnipeg Jets (1986–87)	Denis Savard	2–5–2
10	L	October 28, 1986	1–2	@ Toronto Maple Leafs (1986–87)	Russ Courtnall	2–6–2
11	L	October 29, 1986	2–5	@ Detroit Red Wings (1986–87)	John Ogrodnick	2–7–2

November

Game	Result	Date	Score	Opponent	GWG/GTG	Record
12	W	November 1, 1986	6–5	@ Minnesota North Stars (1986–87)	Al Secord	3–7–2
13	L	November 2, 1986	3–7	@ St. Louis Blues (1986–87)	Brian Benning	3–8–2
14	W	November 5, 1986	4–2	Minnesota North Stars (1986–87)	Steve Ludzik	4–8–2
15	L	November 8, 1986	2–3	@ Washington Capitals (1986–87)	Gaetan Duchesne	4–9–2
16	T	November 9, 1986	4–4 OT	St. Louis Blues (1986–87)	Denis Savard	4–9–3
17	T	November 12, 1986	2–2 OT	Washington Capitals (1986–87)	Larry Murphy	4–9–4
18	L	November 15, 1986	3–4	@ St. Louis Blues (1986–87)	Greg Paslawski	4–10–4
19	L	November 16, 1986	3–7	Toronto Maple Leafs (1986–87)	Gary Leeman	4–11–4
20	T	November 19, 1986	4–4 OT	Los Angeles Kings (1986–87)	Steve Ludzik	4–11–5
21	L	November 20, 1986	1–5	@ Philadelphia Flyers (1986–87)	Tim Kerr	4–12–5
22	W	November 23, 1986	5–3	New Jersey Devils (1986–87)	Denis Savard	5–12–5
23	L	November 26, 1986	2–5	@ Minnesota North Stars (1986–87)	Dino Ciccarelli	5–13–5
24	W	November 28, 1986	6–5 OT	@ Edmonton Oilers (1986–87)	Al Secord	6–13–5
25	L	November 29, 1986	4–5	@ Calgary Flames (1986–87)	Dale DeGray	6–14–5

December

Game	Result	Date	Score	Opponent	GWG/GTG	Record
26	W	December 2, 1986	4–2	@ Vancouver Canucks (1986–87)	Troy Murray	7–14–5
27	L	December 4, 1986	1–4	@ Calgary Flames (1986–87)	Joe Mullen	7–15–5
28	L	December 6, 1986	2–7	@ Los Angeles Kings (1986–87)	Garry Galley	7–16–5
29	W	December 10, 1986	6–3	Buffalo Sabres (1986–87)	Wayne Presley	8–16–5
30	T	December 13, 1986	4–4 OT	@ St. Louis Blues (1986–87)	Mark LaVarre	8–16–6
31	L	December 14, 1986	3–7	Vancouver Canucks (1986–87)	Rich Sutter	8–17–6
32	W	December 17, 1986	5–1	Winnipeg Jets (1986–87)	Steve Larmer	9–17–6
33	W	December 20, 1986	6–2	@ Boston Bruins (1986–87)	Curt Fraser	10–17–6
34	W	December 21, 1986	7–4	Detroit Red Wings (1986–87)	Steve Larmer	11–17–6
35	L	December 23, 1986	1–3	@ Detroit Red Wings (1986–87)	Adam Oates	11–18–6
36	W	December 26, 1986	8–6	St. Louis Blues (1986–87)	Denis Savard	12–18–6
37	W	December 28, 1986	7–5	Washington Capitals (1986–87)	Denis Savard	13–18–6
38	W	December 30, 1986	5–3	@ New York Islanders (1986–87)	Curt Fraser	14–18–6
39	L	December 31, 1986	2–5	@ Buffalo Sabres (1986–87)	Dave Andreychuk	14–19–6

January

Game	Result	Date	Score	Opponent	GWG/GTG	Record
40	W	January 3, 1987	3–2	@ Hartford Whalers (1986–87)	Bob Murray	15–19–6
41	L	January 4, 1987	1–4	Calgary Flames (1986–87)	John Tonelli	15–20–6
42	W	January 7, 1987	6–4	Toronto Maple Leafs (1986–87)	Al Secord	16–20–6
43	W	January 11, 1987	5–3	Detroit Red Wings (1986–87)	Steve Larmer	17–20–6
44	L	January 14, 1987	1–3	New Jersey Devils (1986–87)	John MacLean	17–21–6
45	L	January 17, 1987	2–3	@ Minnesota North Stars (1986–87)	Brian Bellows	17–22–6
46	L	January 18, 1987	3–5	Quebec Nordiques (1986–87)	Paul Gillis	17–23–6
47	T	January 21, 1987	5–5 OT	Philadelphia Flyers (1986–87)	Troy Murray	17–23–7
48	L	January 23, 1987	3–4	@ Philadelphia Flyers (1986–87)	Lindsay Carson	17–24–7
49	L	January 24, 1987	1–3	@ Montreal Canadiens (1986–87)	Bob Gainey	17–25–7
50	L	January 26, 1987	2–3	Montreal Canadiens (1986–87)	Chris Chelios	17–26–7
51	W	January 28, 1987	5–0	Toronto Maple Leafs (1986–87)	Wayne Presley	18–26–7
52	T	January 31, 1987	4–4 OT	@ St. Louis Blues (1986–87)	Mark Hunter	18–26–8

February

Game	Result	Date	Score	Opponent	GWG/GTG	Record
53	W	February 1, 1987	6–4	Edmonton Oilers (1986–87)	Troy Murray	19–26–8
54	W	February 4, 1987	5–4	Detroit Red Wings (1986–87)	Ed Olczyk	20–26–8
55	L	February 7, 1987	1–4	@ Pittsburgh Penguins (1986–87)	Craig Simpson	20–27–8
56	L	February 8, 1987	4–7	@ Buffalo Sabres (1986–87)	Doug Smith	20–28–8
57	W	February 15, 1987	6–4	Quebec Nordiques (1986–87)	Troy Murray	21–28–8
58	L	February 17, 1987	4–5	Hartford Whalers (1986–87)	Dave Tippett	21–29–8
59	W	February 19, 1987	5–2	New York Rangers (1986–87)	Wayne Presley	22–29–8
60	W	February 21, 1987	6–3	@ Hartford Whalers (1986–87)	Ed Olczyk	23–29–8
61	T	February 22, 1987	2–2 OT	Detroit Red Wings (1986–87)	Troy Murray	23–29–9
62	T	February 25, 1987	3–3 OT	Montreal Canadiens (1986–87)	Craig Ludwig	23–29–10
63	W	February 28, 1987	2–1	@ Pittsburgh Penguins (1986–87)	Wayne Presley	24–29–10

March

Game	Result	Date	Score	Opponent	GWG/GTG	Record
64	W	March 1, 1987	6–1	Los Angeles Kings (1986–87)	Rich Preston	25–29–10
65	W	March 4, 1987	3–2	Winnipeg Jets (1986–87)	Denis Savard	26–29–10
66	W	March 7, 1987	4–3	@ New Jersey Devils (1986–87)	Doug Wilson	27–29–10
67	L	March 8, 1987	5–6	New York Islanders (1986–87)	Bryan Trottier	27–30–10
68	L	March 11, 1987	2–3	St. Louis Blues (1986–87)	Charlie Bourgeois	27–31–10
69	T	March 14, 1987	4–4 OT	@ Boston Bruins (1986–87)	Keith Brown	27–31–11
70	L	March 15, 1987	2–4	Minnesota North Stars (1986–87)	Brian Lawton	27–32–11
71	T	March 17, 1987	3–3 OT	@ Minnesota North Stars (1986–87)	Marc Bergevin	27–32–12
72	W	March 18, 1987	6–3	@ Toronto Maple Leafs (1986–87)	Denis Savard	28–32–12
73	L	March 21, 1987	0–3	@ Detroit Red Wings (1986–87)	Lee Norwood	28–33–12
74	L	March 22, 1987	3–5	@ New York Rangers (1986–87)	Walt Poddubny	28–34–12
75	T	March 25, 1987	4–4 OT	St. Louis Blues (1986–87)	Darryl Sutter	28–34–13
76	L	March 28, 1987	4–5	@ Quebec Nordiques (1986–87)	Peter Stastny	28–35–13
77	L	March 29, 1987	6–8	Boston Bruins (1986–87)	Ken Linseman	28–36–13

April

Game	Result	Date	Score	Opponent	GWG/GTG	Record
78	T	April 1, 1987	4–4 OT	Minnesota North Stars (1986–87)	Ron Wilson	28–36–14
79	L	April 4, 1987	1–3	@ Toronto Maple Leafs (1986–87)	Wendel Clark	28–37–14
80	W	April 5, 1987	5–2	Toronto Maple Leafs (1986–87)	Denis Savard	29–37–14

Legend: Win (2 points) Loss (0 points) Tie (1 point)

== Playoffs ==
=== Detroit Red Wings 4, Chicago Blackhawks 0 ===
The Blackhawks opened the 1987 Stanley Cup playoffs against the Detroit Red Wings. The Red Wings finished the 1986–87 season with a record of 34–36–10, earning 78 points and second place in the Norris Division, which was six more points than the third place Blackhawks.

The series opened at Joe Louis Arena in Detroit as Bob Sauve got the nod in goal. The Red Wings opened the scoring early in the first period on a goal by Petr Klima, and they would extend their lead to 2–0 after a goal by Darren Veitch before the first intermission. After a scoreless second period, Bob Murray got the Blackhawks to within one after scoring midway through the third period. The Red Wings Shawn Burr then scored just a little over two minutes later, as Detroit held on for a 3–1 victory.

In the second game, the Red Wings again scored early, as Gerard Gallant scored only 37 seconds into the game, giving the Wings a 1–0 lead. Joey Kocur extended the Detroit lead to 2-0 midway through the period. In the second period, Steve Yzerman made it 3-0 for the Red Wings before Marc Bergevin replied for the Blackhawks, cutting the Wings lead to 3–1. Detroit restored their three-goal lead on a Shawn Burr goal, making it 4-1 for the Red Wings after two periods. In the third period, Adam Oates capped off the scoring for Detroit, as they cruised their way to a 5–1 victory and a 2–0 series lead. The Red Wings defence held the Blackhawks to only 15 shots in the game.

The series moved to Chicago Stadium for the third game of the series. In the first period, the Red Wings again opened the scoring, as Steve Yzerman beat goaltender Bob Sauve, giving Detroit a 1–0 lead 5:28 into the game. A minute later, the Red Wings Mel Bridgman made it 2–0. Bridgman added another goal in the final minute of the period, as the Wings took a 3–0 lead. The Blackhawks scored the only goal of the second period, as Denis Savard scored 2:23 into the period, cutting the Wings lead to 3-1 heading into the third. Only 21 seconds into the third period, the Hawks Curt Fraser scored, as the Hawks were within a goal, down 3–2. Late in the period, Ed Olczyk scored the tying goal, as the Hawks sent the game into overtime. In the extra period, the Wings Shawn Burr scored his third goal in three games, as Detroit defeated Chicago 4–3, and took a 3–0 series lead.

The Blackhawks stayed with Bob Sauve in goal for the fourth game, and for the fourth time in the series, the Wings scored first, as Brent Ashton scored midway through the first period for a 1-0 Red Wings lead. In the second period, Mel Bridgman scored only 35 seconds into the period, as Detroit took a 2–0 lead in the game. Wayne Presley got the Blackhawks on the board with a goal at 9:26 of the period, however, the Red Wings Dave Barr scored 41 seconds later, restoring Detroit's two-goal lead. In the third period, the Hawks fired 18 shots at Red Wings goaltender Greg Stefan, however, they could not score, and the game finished with the Wings winning 3–1, and sweeping the series 4 games to 0. Stefan was the star of the game for the Red Wings, making 46 saves.

1987 Stanley Cup playoffs
Norris Division Semifinals vs. (N2) Detroit Red Wings – Red Wings win 4–0

Game	Result	Date	Score	Opponent	GWG	Series
1	L	April 8, 1987	1–3	@ Detroit Red Wings (1986–87)	Darren Veitch	0–1
2	L	April 9, 1987	1–5	@ Detroit Red Wings (1986–87)	Joe Kocur	0–2
3	L	April 11, 1987	3–4 OT	Detroit Red Wings (1986–87)	Shawn Burr	0–3
4	L	April 12, 1987	1–3	Detroit Red Wings (1986–87)	Mel Bridgman	0–4

Legend: Win Loss

== Player stats ==
=== Regular season ===
Scoring

Player	Pos	GP	G	A	Pts	PIM	+/-	PPG	SHG	GWG
Denis Savard	C	70	40	50	90	108	15	7	0	7
Steve Larmer	RW	80	28	56	84	22	20	10	0	4
Troy Murray	C	77	28	43	71	59	14	4	2	3
Wayne Presley	RW	80	32	29	61	114	-18	7	0	4
Al Secord	LW	77	29	29	58	196	-20	5	0	3
Ed Olczyk	C	79	16	35	51	119	-4	2	1	2
Curt Fraser	LW	75	25	25	50	182	5	3	0	2
Doug Wilson	D	69	16	32	48	36	15	7	1	1
Bob Murray	D	79	6	38	44	80	-9	4	0	1
Bill Watson	RW	51	13	19	32	6	19	0	0	0
Gary Nylund	D	80	7	20	27	190	-9	2	0	0
Keith Brown	D	73	4	23	27	86	5	2	0	0
Mark LaVarre	RW	58	8	15	23	33	11	0	0	0
Dave Donnelly	C	71	6	12	18	81	-7	0	0	0
Rich Preston	RW	73	8	9	17	19	-8	0	0	1
Steve Ludzik	C	52	5	12	17	34	-3	0	0	1
Darryl Sutter	LW	44	8	6	14	16	-3	1	0	0
Marc Bergevin	D	66	4	10	14	66	4	0	0	0
Jack O'Callahan	D	48	1	13	14	59	10	1	0	0
Mike Stapleton	C	39	3	6	9	6	-9	0	0	0
Dave Manson	D	63	1	8	9	146	-2	0	0	0
Everett Sanipass	LW	7	1	3	4	2	3	0	0	0
Bob Sauve	G	46	0	4	4	6	0	0	0	0
Rick Paterson	C	22	1	2	3	6	1	0	1	0
Murray Bannerman	G	39	0	1	1	4	0	0	0	0
James Camazzola	LW	2	0	0	0	0	0	0	0	0
Bruce Cassidy	D	2	0	0	0	0	-1	0	0	0
Darin Sceviour	RW	1	0	0	0	0	0	0	0	0
Warren Skorodenski	G	3	0	0	0	0	0	0	0	0

Goaltending

Player	MIN	GP	W	L	T	GA	GAA	SO	SA	SV	SV%
Bob Sauve	2660	46	19	19	5	159	3.59	1	1497	1338	.894
Murray Bannerman	2059	39	9	18	8	142	4.14	0	1122	980	.873
Warren Skorodenski	155	3	1	0	1	7	2.71	0	90	83	.922
Team:	4874	80	29	37	14	308	3.79	1	2709	2401	.886

=== Playoffs ===
Scoring

Player	Pos	GP	G	A	Pts	PIM	+/-	PPG	SHG	GWG
Curt Fraser	LW	2	1	1	2	10	-1	0	0	0
Ed Olczyk	C	4	1	1	2	4	1	0	0	0
Gary Nylund	D	4	0	2	2	11	-1	0	0	0
Rich Preston	RW	4	0	2	2	4	2	0	0	0
Marc Bergevin	D	3	1	0	1	2	-1	0	0	0
Bob Murray	D	4	1	0	1	4	-2	0	0	0
Wayne Presley	RW	4	1	0	1	9	-2	0	0	0
Denis Savard	C	4	1	0	1	12	-3	0	0	0
Keith Brown	D	4	0	1	1	6	-1	0	0	0
Bill Watson	RW	4	0	1	1	0	-1	0	0	0
Dave Donnelly	C	1	0	0	0	0	0	0	0	0
Steve Larmer	RW	4	0	0	0	2	-2	0	0	0
Steve Ludzik	C	4	0	0	0	0	-1	0	0	0
Dave Manson	D	3	0	0	0	10	-2	0	0	0
Troy Murray	C	4	0	0	0	5	-3	0	0	0
Jack O'Callahan	D	2	0	0	0	2	0	0	0	0
Bob Sauve	G	4	0	0	0	0	0	0	0	0
Al Secord	LW	4	0	0	0	21	-2	0	0	0
Mike Stapleton	C	4	0	0	0	2	0	0	0	0
Darryl Sutter	LW	2	0	0	0	0	0	0	0	0
Dan Vincelette	LW	3	0	0	0	0	-4	0	0	0
Doug Wilson	D	4	0	0	0	0	-2	0	0	0

Goaltending

Player	MIN	GP	W	L	GA	GAA	SO	SA	SV	SV%
Bob Sauve	245	4	0	4	15	3.67	0	136	121	.890
Team:	245	4	0	4	15	3.67	0	136	121	.890

Note: Pos = Position; GP = Games played; G = Goals; A = Assists; Pts = Points; +/- = plus/minus; PIM = Penalty minutes; PPG = Power-play goals; SHG = Short-handed goals; GWG = Game-winning goals
MIN = Minutes played; W = Wins; L = Losses; T = Ties; GA = Goals-against; GAA = Goals-against average; SO = Shutouts; SA = Shots against; SV = Shots saved; SV% = Save percentage;

== Draft picks ==
Chicago's draft picks at the 1986 NHL entry draft held at the Montreal Forum in Montreal.

Round	#	Player	Nationality	College/Junior/Club team (League)
1	14	Everett Sanipass	Canada	Verdun Junior Canadiens (QMJHL)
2	35	Mark Kurzawski	United States	Windsor Compuware Spitfires (OHL)
4	77	Frantisek Kucera	Czechoslovakia	Sparta Prague (Czechoslovakia)
5	98	Lonnie Loach	Canada	Guelph Platers (OHL)
6	119	Mario Doyon	Canada	Drummondville Voltigeurs (QMJHL)
7	140	Mike Hudson	Canada	Sudbury Wolves (OHL)
8	161	Marty Nanne	United States	University of Minnesota (WCHA)
9	182	Geoff Benic	Canada	Windsor Compuware Spitfires (OHL)
10	203	Glenn Lowes	Canada	Toronto Marlboros (OHL)
11	224	Chris Thayer	United States	Kent School (USHS-CT)
12	245	Sean Williams	Canada	Oshawa Generals (OHL)
S2	17	Dave Randall	Canada	Northern Michigan University (CCHA)

== See also ==
- 1986–87 NHL season
