= Jeff Brown (ice hockey, born 1966) =

Canadian ice hockey player

- Born: April 30, 1966 (age 60) Ottawa, Ontario, Canada
- Height: 6 ft 2 in (188 cm)
- Weight: 204 lb (93 kg; 14 st 8 lb)
- Position: Defence
- Shot: Right
- Played for: Quebec Nordiques; St. Louis Blues; Vancouver Canucks; Hartford Whalers; Carolina Hurricanes; Toronto Maple Leafs; Washington Capitals
- NHL draft: 36th overall, 1984; Quebec Nordiques
- Playing career: 1985–1998

Another Jeff Brown was drafted in the first round of the 1996 NHL Entry Draft but never played in the NHL. See Jeff Brown (ice hockey, born 1978).

Jeff Randall Brown (born April 30, 1966) is a Canadian former professional ice hockey defenceman who played in the National Hockey League (NHL) from the mid-1980s to late 1990s. He was selected to play in the 1992 NHL All-Star Game and holds many offensive records for the St. Louis Blues.

== Playing career ==
=== Junior hockey ===
Brown joined the Sudbury Wolves of the Ontario Hockey League (OHL) when he was selected in the first round, second overall, in the 1982 OHL Priority Draft. In his first season with Sudbury in 1982–83, Brown appeared in 65 games, scoring nine goals and 46 points, leading the Wolves defense in scoring and finishing fifth in overall team scoring. The rebuilding club, however, failed to qualify for the post-season. In 1983–84, Brown scored 17 goals and 77 points in 68 games, finishing second in team scoring. The club, however, again failed to qualify for the post-season. Brown led the Wolves in scoring during the 1984–85 season with 64 points, scoring 16 goals and 48 assists in 56 games. Sudbury missed the playoffs once again. In 1985–86, Brown missed 21 games, but he scored 22 goals, a career high in the OHL, and had 50 points, helping Sudbury reach the playoffs for the first and only time in his junior career. In four playoff games, Brown had two assists, as the Wolves were swept by the Guelph Platers in the first round. Brown was awarded the Max Kaminsky Trophy, awarded to the most outstanding defenseman in the OHL, and was named to the OHL First All-Star team.

=== Professional career ===
==== Quebec Nordiques ====
Brown was drafted by the Quebec Nordiques in the second round, 36th overall, at the 1984 NHL entry draft held at the Montreal Forum. During the 1985–86 season, he appeared in eight games, scoring three goals and five points. In one playoff game, Brown was held off the scoresheet. Brown also appeared in one post-season game with the Nordiques AHL affiliate, the Fredericton Express, getting no points.

He began the 1986–87 season with the Express, appearing in 26 games, scoring two goals and 16 points, before being promoted to Quebec. Brown finished the 1986–87 season with the Nordiques, scoring seven goals and 29 points in 44 games. In 11 playoff games, Brown scored three goals and six points in 13 games, as the Nordiques lost to their provincial rivals, the Montreal Canadiens, in seven games in the Adams Division final. Brown spent the entire 1987–88 season with the Nordiques, appearing in 78 games, scoring 16 goals and 53 points, the most among Nordiques defensemen, and fifth on the team; however, the club failed to reach the post-season.

In 1988–89, Brown scored 21 goals and 68 points in 78 games, again leading Nordiques defensemen in scoring, and having the third highest total on the club. The rebuilding Nordiques, however, missed the playoffs for the second consecutive season. Brown began the 1989–90 season with Quebec, as in 29 games he scored six goals and 16 points. On December 13, 1989, the Nordiques traded Brown to the St. Louis Blues for Tony Hrkac and Greg Millen.

==== St. Louis Blues ====
Brown finished the 1989–90 season with the St. Louis Blues, scoring 10 goals and 38 points in 48 games, helping the Blues reach the post-season. In the playoffs, Brown scored two goals and 12 points in 12 games, as the Blues lost to the Chicago Blackhawks in seven games in the Norris Division final. In 1990–91, Brown led the Blues defense in scoring, as he had 12 goals and 59 points in 67 games, as he missed nearly a month of the season due to broken left ankle, and was third in overall team scoring, only behind Brett Hull and Adam Oates, as the Blues finished with the second best record in the league, getting 105 points. In the playoffs, Brown scored three goals and 12 points in 13 games, but the Blues were upset by the Minnesota North Stars in the Norris Division final, losing in six games.

Brown scored at least 20 goals for the second time of his career in 1991–92, as in 80 games, he had 20 goals and 59 points, again leading the Blues defense in scoring, and tied for fourth for team scoring, as St. Louis reached the post-season once again. The 20 goals tied Larry Sacharuk's team record. In the playoffs, Brown had two goals and three points in six games, as the Blues lost to the Chicago Blackhawks in the first round of the playoffs. In 1992–93, Brown had the best season of his career, setting a career high with 25 goals and 78 points in 71 games, leading the Blues defense in scoring again, and fourth on the team, despite missing 13 games due to a broken foot. The 25 goals established a new single-season team record for defencemen that held as of 2020. In the playoffs, Brown had three goals and 11 points in 11 games, tied for second in overall team scoring, as the club swept the Chicago Blackhawks in the first round of the playoffs, before losing to the Toronto Maple Leafs in seven games in the Norris Division final. Brown began the 1993–94 season with St. Louis, appearing in 68 games, scoring 13 goals and 60 points, leading the defense in scoring for the fourth straight season. On March 21, 1994, the Blues traded Brown, Bret Hedican and Nathan LaFayette to the Vancouver Canucks for Craig Janney.

==== Vancouver Canucks ====
Brown finished 1993–94 with the Canucks after his late season trade, appearing in 11 games with the team, scoring a goal and six points. In the playoffs, Brown scored six goals and 15 points in 24 games, leading the Canucks defense in scoring, as Vancouver lost to the New York Rangers in seven games in the 1994 Stanley Cup Final. In the lockout shortened 1994–95 season, Brown appeared in 33 games with Vancouver, scoring eight goals and 31 points, finishing fourth in overall team scoring, despite missing 15 games due to a cracked bone in his wrist after being slashed by Kris Draper of the Detroit Red Wings, and a separated shoulder late in the season. Brown appeared in only five of eleven playoff games for Vancouver due to a thigh injury, scoring a goal and four points, as the Canucks were swept by the Blackhawks in the second round of the playoffs. Brown started the 1995–96 season with Vancouver, appearing in 28 games, as he scored one goal and 17 points.

On December 19, 1995, the Canucks traded Brown and their third round draft pick in the 1998 NHL entry draft to the Hartford Whalers for Jim Dowd, Frantisek Kucera and the Whalers second-round pick in the 1997 NHL entry draft. In 1996, a rumor circulating was that Brown was traded because he slept with team starting goaltender Kirk McLean's first wife Lesley Shaddock. Shaddock, McLean and Brown revealed to CBC in 2025 that the rumor was categorically false. Brown said that he never met McLean's former wives and that his trade had more to do with a personality clash with then head coach Rick Ley.

==== Hartford Whalers/Carolina Hurricanes ====
Brown finished the 1995–96 season with the Hartford Whalers, appearing in 48 games, scoring seven goals and 38 points to lead the team defense in scoring, but the Whalers failed to reach the post-season. During the season opener of the 1996–97 season against the Pittsburgh Penguins, Brown suffered from a back injury, which required season-ending disc fusion surgery, causing him to miss the entire season. In his only game, he was held off the scoresheet.

During the summer of 1997, the Whalers franchise relocated and became the Carolina Hurricanes for the 1997–98 season. In 32 games with the Hurricanes, Brown scored three goals and 13 points. On December 20, 1997, Brown suffered a deep gash in his shin from a Washington Capitals players skate, resulting the injury be stitched up, as Brown was able to return to action. On January 2, 1998, the Hurricanes traded Brown to the Toronto Maple Leafs for the Maple Leafs fourth round draft pick in the 1998 NHL Entry Draft. This trade was made the day before McLeanwas acquired from the Vancouver Canucks.

==== Toronto Maple Leafs ====
After playing three games with the Toronto Maple Leafs following his trade from the Carolina Hurricanes, the shin injury that Brown suffered while playing with the Hurricanes was not healing very well, and Brown began experiencing severe chills and became very ill. He asked Toronto trainers if he could go home, but trainers Chris Broadhurst and Brent Smith spotted something wrong with the scar on his leg. Its inflammation appeared to be spreading to other parts of the body. Broadhurst and Smith insisted that Brown see a doctor, but by the time he got there, he was already in shock. Unsure what was wrong, the trainers then rushed him to the hospital, where doctors performed emergency surgery. They found a potentially deadly virus related to the flesh-eating bacteria that had entered the infected area of Brown's leg. The surgery saved Brown's life, and he returned to action for Toronto's February 4, 1998, game against the St. Louis Blues. Brown would appear in 19 games with the Maple Leafs during the 1997–98 season, scoring a goal and nine points. The Leafs traded Brown to the Washington Capitals for Sylvain Cote on March 24, 1998.

==== Washington Capitals ====
Brown finished the 1997–98 season with the Capitals, earning six assists in nine games with the club, as Washington reached the playoffs. In the post-season, Brown was limited to two games due to headaches, as he earned two assists. The Capitals reached the 1998 Stanley Cup Final, losing to the Detroit Red Wings. After the season, Brown became a free agent but retired from playing after he was unable to find a new team to sign with.

== Coaching career ==
Brown coached the Missouri River Otters of the United Hockey League (UHL) during the 2005–06 season, replacing head coach Kevin Kaminski, who was fired after the team began the season with an 11-27-3 record. Under Brown, the River Otters improved, going 13–18–4; however, the club failed to make the playoffs. After the season, the River Otters folded. Brown then began coaching the St. Louis Bandits of the North American Hockey League (NAHL). In his first season with the club in 2008–09, the Bandits had a record of 42–9–7, winning the South Division. In the playoffs, the Bandits won the Robertson Cup, defeating the Wenatchee Wild in the final game. It was the third consecutive season that St. Louis won the championship. In 2009–10, the Bandits finished second in the South Division, going 44–11–3; however, the club failed to win the championship, finishing in fifth in the Nationals.

In 2010–11, the Bandits went 41-13-4 and won the North Division. In the post-season, the Bandits lost to the Michigan Warriors in the second round, losing in the fifth and deciding game. St. Louis had another elite regular season in 2011–12, going 42–15–3, and winning the Midwest Division. In the playoffs, the Bandits lost to the Texas Tornados in the championship game, losing 4–3 in overtime. The club became dormant, and in 2013 the franchise was sold to the ownership of the Minnesota Wilderness.

Brown took over as head coach of the Indiana Ice of the United States Hockey League (USHL) for the last part of the 2012–13 season; however, the Ice failed to qualify for the post-season, as the club finished with a 21-37-7 record. In 2013–14, Brown led the Ice to a 42-11-7 record, first place in the Eastern Conference. In the post-season, the Ice won the Clark Cup, defeating the Waterloo Black Hawks in five games to claim the championship.

Brown became the eighth head coach in Ottawa 67's history, for the 2014–15 season, taking over a rebuilding club that had missed the playoffs the previous two seasons. In his first season with the 67's, Brown led the team back into the post-season, with a 38-25-5 record, earning him the OHL's third All-Star team coach. In the post-season, the 67's lost to the Niagara IceDogs in the first round, losing in six games. In the summer of 2015 Brown became both head coach and general manager, replacing Pat Higgins, who became the team's head scout. On April 25, 2017, Brown announced his resignation from the 67's as the team's head coach and general manager, for personal reasons.

== Personal ==
Brown's son Logan was born in Raleigh two months later as Brown's family stayed behind following the mid-season trade. He also plays hockey and was drafted 11th overall by the Ottawa Senators in the 2016 NHL Draft.

== Career statistics ==
			Regular season					Playoffs
Season	Team	League	GP	G	A	Pts	PIM	GP	G	A	Pts	PIM
1981–82	Hawkesbury Hawks	CJHL	49	12	47	59	72	—	—	—	—	—
1982–83	Sudbury Wolves	OHL	65	9	37	46	39	—	—	—	—	—
1983–84	Sudbury Wolves	OHL	68	17	60	77	39	—	—	—	—	—
1984–85	Sudbury Wolves	OHL	56	16	48	64	26	—	—	—	—	—
1985–86	Sudbury Wolves	OHL	45	22	28	50	24	4	0	2	2	11
1985–86	Quebec Nordiques	NHL	8	3	2	5	6	1	0	0	0	0
1985–86	Fredericton Express	AHL	—	—	—	—	—	1	0	1	1	0
1986–87	Fredericton Express	AHL	26	2	14	16	16	—	—	—	—	—
1986–87	Quebec Nordiques	NHL	44	7	22	29	16	13	3	3	6	2
1987–88	Quebec Nordiques	NHL	78	16	37	53	64	—	—	—	—	—
1988–89	Quebec Nordiques	NHL	78	21	47	68	62	—	—	—	—	—
1989–90	Quebec Nordiques	NHL	29	6	10	16	18	—	—	—	—	—
1989–90	St. Louis Blues	NHL	48	10	28	38	37	12	2	10	12	4
1990–91	St. Louis Blues	NHL	67	12	47	59	39	13	3	9	12	6
1991–92	St. Louis Blues	NHL	80	20	39	59	38	6	2	1	3	2
1992–93	St. Louis Blues	NHL	71	25	53	78	58	11	3	8	11	6
1993–94	St. Louis Blues	NHL	63	13	47	60	46	—	—	—	—	—
1993–94	Vancouver Canucks	NHL	11	1	5	6	10	24	6	9	15	37
1994–95	Vancouver Canucks	NHL	33	8	23	31	16	5	1	3	4	2
1995–96	Vancouver Canucks	NHL	28	1	16	17	18	—	—	—	—	—
1995–96	Hartford Whalers	NHL	48	7	31	38	38	—	—	—	—	—
1996–97	Hartford Whalers	NHL	1	0	0	0	0	—	—	—	—	—
1997–98	Carolina Hurricanes	NHL	32	3	10	13	16	—	—	—	—	—
1997–98	Toronto Maple Leafs	NHL	19	1	8	9	10	—	—	—	—	—
1997–98	Washington Capitals	NHL	9	0	6	6	6	2	0	2	2	0
NHL totals			747	154	431	585	498	87	20	45	65	59
