= 1989–90 Edmonton Oilers season =

NHL team season

1989–90 Edmonton Oilers
- Stanley Cup champions
- Campbell Conference champions
- Division: 2nd Smythe
- Conference: 2nd Campbell
- 1989–90 record: 38–28–14
- Home record: 23–11–6
- Road record: 15–17–8
- Goals for: 315
- Goals against: 283

Team information
- General manager: Glen Sather
- Coach: John Muckler
- Captain: Mark Messier
- Alternate captains: Jari Kurri; Kevin Lowe
- Arena: Northlands Coliseum
- Average attendance: 17,009 (97.2%)
- Minor league affiliates: Cape Breton Oilers (AHL); Phoenix Roadrunners (IHL)

Team leaders
- Goals: Mark Messier (45)
- Assists: Mark Messier (84)
- Points: Mark Messier (129)
- Penalty minutes: Craig Simpson (180)
- Plus/minus: Randy Gregg (+24)
- Wins: Bill Ranford (24)
- Goals against average: Bill Ranford (3.19)

The 1989–90 Edmonton Oilers season was the Oilers' 11th season in the NHL, and they were coming off their shortest playoff run in seven years when the Los Angeles Kings defeated Edmonton in the first round of the playoffs. Edmonton improved their point total from 84 to 90 and finished in second place in the Smythe Division.

== Regular season ==
In the first month of the season, the Oilers faced adversity on multiple fronts, on and off the ice. First, goaltender Grant Fuhr underwent an emergency appendectomy in training camp that kept him sidelined for several weeks. Backup goaltender Bill Ranford started the season in his place. Next, forward Jimmy Carson, the team's leading goal scorer from the previous year, abruptly left the team after the 4th game of the season and demanded a trade. Among his reasons, Carson found the pressure of replacing Wayne Gretzky, the player he was traded for, impossible to play under. In addition, Carson, who grew up in Michigan with an affluent family, did not enjoy life in the city of Edmonton, which was nearing the end of a crushing recession. Finally, the Oilers granted Carson's wish and dealt him to his hometown Detroit Red Wings. In return, the Oilers received forwards Petr Klima, Joe Murphy, and Adam Graves, and defenceman Jeff Sharples from Detroit. Finally, in the Oilers' fifth game of the season, at home against the Los Angeles Kings, Wayne Gretzky broke the all-time NHL points record held by Gordie Howe; watching Gretzky celebrate the milestone was tough on his former Oilers' teammates, who felt they should have been the ones celebrating with him. These incidents, combined with weak defensive play and penalty killing, combined to put the Oilers on a slide early in the season, and they reached the quarter-mark of the season with a 6–9–5 record, which sat them in last place in the Smythe Division. To make matters worse, Fuhr, who returned from his appendectomy, injured his shoulder and was sidelined again. The one bright spot on the team was forward Mark Messier, who sat second in the NHL in points at the 20-game mark and battled all season with Gretzky, Mario Lemieux and Steve Yzerman for the Art Ross Trophy.

Then, buoyed by the formation of the line of Martin Gelinas, Graves, and Murphy, the Oilers embarked on a run where they lost only once in 13 games. While many of their offensive stars were not scoring as they did in previous seasons, the Oilers succeeded by playing an all-around game and overtook the slumping Calgary Flames for first place in the division. The Oilers' record over their next twenty games was 15–3–2, and they finished the halfway point of the season with a record of 21–12–7, good for second place in the entire NHL behind the Buffalo Sabres. Messier continued his stellar play in all areas of the ice and was considered to be one of two favourites for the Hart Trophy along with Bruins' captain Ray Bourque.

At the 41st NHL All Star Game in Pittsburgh, three players represented the Oilers: Messier, Kevin Lowe, and Jari Kurri. Lowe was voted in as a starter by the fans, the last time to date that the Oilers had a player voted into the starting lineup via fan balloting until Connor McDavid in 2017.

As the second half of the season got underway, the Oilers entered a mid-season slump. The team could not piece together any sort of meaningful winning streak and finished the third quarter of the season with a record of 7–8–5, good enough for an overall season record of 28–20–12. One notable achievement came on January 2 in a game against the St. Louis Blues, where Jari Kurri scored the 1,000th point of his career. Another notable game occurred on January 25 at home against the Kings, where the Oilers fell behind 6–3 after 40 minutes. In the third period, the Oilers mounted their biggest comeback of the regular season, scoring four goals en route to a 7–6 victory. Messier led the way with four assists in a performance that completely overshadowed Wayne Gretzky.

Grant Fuhr was plagued by injury problems throughout the season and struggled to find his form, and was in net for a March 9 game against the Winnipeg Jets where the Oilers squandered a 4–0 first-period lead and lost the game 7–5. Fuhr injured his shoulder shortly afterward and missed a month with the injury. Ranford started most of the games during Fuhr's injury absences, but he too was injured by an errant stick in a game against the New Jersey Devils on February 6, forcing third-string goaltender Pokey Reddick into service. The club also made use of minor league goalies Randy Exelby and Mike Greenlay at this time. On February 25, the Oilers lost to their provincial rivals, the Flames, by a lopsided score of 10–4. The loss put the Oilers in an unfriendly mood, and during their next game in Los Angeles on February 28, the teams combined for a then-NHL record 86 penalties, mostly in fighting majors, in a 4–2 Edmonton loss. Incidents in the game drew the ire of commentators and even earned negative commentary from the NHL's head office. In the second last game of the season against Calgary, Grant Fuhr re-injured his bad shoulder and had to sit out for the entire playoffs. The team finished the last quarter of the season with a 10–8–2 record: the Oilers finished the season with a record of 38–28–14, good for 2nd place in the Smythe Division and 5th place overall in the NHL. Owing to the team's fierceness at varying points in the season, culminating with the brawl in Los Angeles, the Oilers were the most penalized team in the NHL for the first time in team history.

Mark Messier finished second in the NHL scoring race; he finished with a career-high 129 points (45 goals, 84 assists), 13 points behind Wayne Gretzky, 2 ahead of Steve Yzerman, and 6 ahead of Mario Lemieux (who missed 21 games with back injuries). Messier was the lone Oiler to break the 100-point barrier. Jari Kurri recorded 93 points (33 goals, 60 assists); it was Kurri's lowest point total in 8 seasons, but in keeping with the Oilers' new two-way philosophy under coach John Muckler, Kurri finished with a +18, second highest among Oiler forwards. Craig Simpson provided some scoring, getting 29 goals and 61 points, and provided some toughness, leading the club with 180 penalty minutes. Veteran defenceman Randy Gregg led the team in plus-minus with a +24. In goal, Bill Ranford got the majority of starts, winning a club-high 24 games and having a 3.19 GAA. Grant Fuhr put together a 9–7–3 record with a 3.83 GAA despite being injured throughout the season.

For the seventh time in eight seasons, the Oilers led the league in most short-handed goals scored, with 22. They were also the most penalized team in the league, being short-handed 417 times.

== Playoffs ==
In the opening round of the playoffs, the Oilers faced the third place Winnipeg Jets for the sixth time in club history; the Oilers had won all previous five series played against the Jets and had only lost one game in the five series combined. However, the Jets stunned Edmonton by winning the first game 7–5 at Northlands Coliseum and took a commanding 3–1 series lead with two thrilling one-goal victories on home ice, which included game four going into double overtime. This started speculation that the Oilers could not win without Wayne Gretzky. In Game Five in Edmonton, the Jets built up a 3–1 lead in the second period, and the Oilers' season appeared to be over. However, late in the second period, the Jets had back-to-back breakaways on the same shift, and goalie Bill Ranford stopped them both. After the second breakaway, the Oilers immediately transitioned to offence, and Craig Simpson scored to make it 3–2. Seconds later, the Oilers scored again to tie the game 3–3 heading to intermission. Messier scored the winner in the third period for a 4–3 Edmonton win. In game six in Winnipeg, The Oilers pulled out another 4–3 victory to tie the series. Kurri scored the winner on a slapshot from the right faceoff circle late in the third period. Edmonton won game seven on home ice 4–1, completing the comeback and moving on to the Smythe Division Finals.

In the Smythe Division Finals, the Oilers faced the Los Angeles Kings, who had upset the defending champion Calgary Flames in their opening round, and the team that eliminated the Oilers from the playoffs the previous season. In game one, the Oilers served notice that this time would be different, dominating from start to finish and cruising to an easy 7–0 victory. It was Bill Ranford's first career playoff shutout. Game two was much closer for the first 45 minutes, as the Oilers held a slim 2–1 lead before scoring four goals in the final six minutes en route to an easy 6–1 victory. Game three in Los Angeles saw the Kings jump out to a 3–1 first-period lead before the Oilers scored 4 unanswered goals en route to a 5–4 win. Game four was another high-scoring battle as the teams traded goals throughout regulation, and the game was tied 5–5 at the end of three periods. Joe Murphy scored in the first overtime to clinch the sweep for Edmonton. The Oilers got their revenge for the previous season's playoff loss, sweeping the Kings 4–0 and outscoring them 24–10. Oilers forward Esa Tikkanen almost totally neutralized Wayne Gretzky throughout the series with relentless checking and sound positional play, holding Gretzky to a single point in the entire series.

In the Campbell Conference Finals, the Oilers met the Norris Division champion Chicago Blackhawks. The Oilers took game one of the series, stretching their playoff win streak to eight games before Chicago evened the series at Northlands Coliseum with a 4–3 victory. Game three at Chicago Stadium was dominated by the Blackhawks 5–1, as they took advantage of several Oiler defensive zone turnovers. In game four at Chicago Stadium, Mark Messier ran roughshod over the Blackhawks in what New York Times reporter Jeff Klein called "the most terrifying one-man wrecking crew display in hockey history." Messier scored two goals, added two assists, threw several hard hits, and broke multiple hockey sticks over Blackhawks' players in a 4–2 Edmonton victory. The Oilers returned home and won game five by a tight 4–3 margin, and returned to Chicago Stadium and thumped the Blackhawks 8–4 to clinch the series in six games. Forward Glenn Anderson led the way in the final game, scoring a goal and two assists. The Oilers advanced to the Stanley Cup Final for the sixth time in eight seasons and in their 11-year NHL history.

The team the Oilers faced for the Stanley Cup was the Presidents' Trophy champions, the Boston Bruins, whom the Oilers swept to win the 1988 Stanley Cup. Game One played at the Boston Garden, saw the Oilers jump to a 2–0 lead early in the second period on goals from Adam Graves and Glenn Anderson before the Bruins tied the game in the third on two goals from Ray Bourque. The game went into overtime and was won by the Oilers in the third overtime period on a goal from Petr Klima. The Oilers pulled off a stunning victory despite being outshot in the game five2–31. It was the longest Stanley Cup Final game in NHL history at 115:13, a record that still stands. In game two, Bill Ranford kept up his great play, and the Oilers led 2–1 at the end of the first period despite being outshot 10–2. The Oilers cruised to a 7–2 victory on Boston ice behind a three-goal, two-assist performance from Jari Kurri. With his third goal, Kurri surpassed Wayne Gretzky as the NHL's all-time leading playoff goal scorer. The Oilers returned home for game three with a comfortable 2–0 series lead, but on home ice surrendered two quick goals to the Bruins, who never looked back in cruising to a 2–1 victory. Game four saw the Oilers jump on the Bruins early and often: Esa Tikkanen and Steve Smith shut down Bruin forwards Craig Janney and Cam Neely respectively, and the Oilers cruised to a 5–1 win. The Oilers' top line of Simpson, Messier, and Anderson combined for 4 goals and 11 points. Anderson also made a major impact in game five in Boston: after a fast and furious first period, where both teams failed to score, Anderson scored on an end-to-end rush early in the second by walking right through two Boston defenders. Later in the period, Anderson struck again, setting up Simpson for the eventual game-winner with a spinning behind-the-back backhand pass. The Oilers scored twice more in the third and cruised to an easy 4–1 victory to claim the team's fifth Stanley Cup in seven years. Mark Messier, Glenn Anderson, Jari Kurri, Grant Fuhr, Randy Gregg, Charlie Huddy, and Kevin Lowe each won their fifth Stanley Cup with Edmonton. Goaltender Bill Ranford, a former Bruin, won the Conn Smythe Trophy after he tied an NHL record by winning all 16 playoff games. Ranford was especially spectacular in the Cup Final, posting a 1.35 GAA and a .949 save percentage against his former team. Craig Simpson led all playoff goal scorers with 16: Simpson tied with Mark Messier for the scoring lead in the playoffs with 31 points each.

== Post-season ==
At the NHL Awards, Mark Messier was voted the winner of the Lester B. Pearson Trophy as the NHLPA's most outstanding player, and the winner of the Hart Trophy as the NHL's most valuable player. Messier was also voted to the NHL's First All-Star Team at centre. Assistant captain Kevin Lowe was voted the winner of the King Clancy Memorial Trophy for his humanitarian contributions to the community.

== Season standings ==
Smythe Division
	GP	W	L	T	GF	GA	Pts
**Calgary Flames**	80	42	23	15	348	265	99
**Edmonton Oilers**	80	38	28	14	315	283	90
**Winnipeg Jets**	80	37	32	11	298	290	85
**Los Angeles Kings**	80	34	39	7	338	337	75
Vancouver Canucks	80	25	41	14	245	306	64

Note: GP = Games played, W = Wins, L = Losses, T = Ties, Pts = Points, GF = Goals for, GA = Goals against
Note: Teams that qualified for the playoffs are highlighted in bold.

Campbell Conference
R		Div	GP	W	L	T	GF	GA	Pts
**1**	**Calgary Flames**	**SMY**	**80**	**42**	**23**	**15**	**348**	**265**	**99**
**2**	**Edmonton Oilers**	**SMY**	**80**	**38**	**28**	**14**	**315**	**283**	**90**
**3**	**Chicago Blackhawks**	**NRS**	**80**	**41**	**33**	**6**	**316**	**294**	**88**
**4**	**Winnipeg Jets**	**SMY**	**80**	**37**	**32**	**11**	**298**	**290**	**85**
**5**	**St. Louis Blues**	**NRS**	**80**	**37**	**34**	**9**	**295**	**279**	**83**
**6**	**Toronto Maple Leafs**	**NRS**	**80**	**38**	**38**	**4**	**337**	**358**	**80**
**7**	**Minnesota North Stars**	**NRS**	**80**	**36**	**40**	**4**	**284**	**291**	**76**
**8**	**Los Angeles Kings**	**SMY**	**80**	**34**	**39**	**7**	**338**	**337**	**75**
9	Detroit Red Wings	NRS	80	28	38	14	288	323	70
10	Vancouver Canucks	SMY	80	25	41	14	245	306	64

Divisions: NRS – Norris, SMY – Smythe

bold – Qualified for playoffs

=== Record vs. opponents ===
==== Vs. Campbell Conference ====
**Vs. Smythe Division**

1989–90 NHL records
Team	**CGY**	**EDM**	**LAK**	**VAN**	**WIN**	**Total**
Calgary	—	4–3–1	4–3–1	5–1–2	3–5	**16–12–4**
Edmonton	3–4–1	—	4–2–2	6–1–1	5–3	**18–10–4**
Los Angeles	3–4–1	2–4–2	—	4–2–2	2–5–1	**11–15–6**
Vancouver	1–5–2	1–6–1	2–4–2	—	2–3–3	**6–18–8**
Winnipeg	5–3	3–5	5–2–1	3–3–2	—	**16–13–3**

**Vs. Norris Division**

1989–90 NHL records
Team	**CHI**	**DET**	**MIN**	**STL**	**TOR**	**Total**
Calgary	2–0–1	1–2	2–1	2–0–1	2–1	**9–4–2**
Edmonton	1–2	1–2	3–0	2–0–1	1–2	**8–6–1**
Los Angeles	1–2	2–1	1–2	2–1	1–2	**7–8–0**
Vancouver	1–2	1–1–1	2–1	1–2	1–2	**6–8–1**
Winnipeg	1–2	1–1–1	1–2	1–1–1	2–0–1	**6–6–3**

Vs. Wales Conference

**Vs. Adams Division**

1989–90 NHL records
Team	**BOS**	**BUF**	**HFD**	**MTL**	**QUE**	**Total**
Calgary	1–1–1	1–1–1	2–0–1	1–2	1–0–2	**6–4–5**
Edmonton	0–2–1	2–1	0–1–2	1–1–1	3–0	**6–5–4**
Los Angeles	1–2	1–2	1–2	1–1–1	3–0	**7–7–1**
Vancouver	2–1	0–2–1	1–2	1–2	0–2–1	**4–9–2**
Winnipeg	1–1–1	0–3	2–1	1–1–1	2–1	**6–7–2**

**Vs. Patrick Division**

1989–90 NHL records
Team	**NJD**	**NYI**	**NYR**	**PHI**	**PIT**	**WSH**	**Total**
Calgary	3–0	3–0	2–1	1–1–1	2–0–1	0–1–2	**11–3–4**
Edmonton	0–1–2	1–0–2	0–2–1	2–1	1–2	2–1	**6–7–5**
Los Angeles	1–2	1–2	2–1	0–3	2–1	3–0	**9–9–0**
Vancouver	3–0	1–2	0–3	1–0–2	2–1	2–0–1	**9–6–3**
Winnipeg	2–1	1–2	1–1–1	2–1	0–2–1	3–0	**9–7–2**

== Schedule and results ==
1989–90 regular season
October: 4–5–3 (home: 1–3–1; road: 3–2–2)

#	Date	Visitor	Score	Home	OT	Decision	Attendance	Record	Points	Recap
1	October 5	Edmonton Oilers	4 – 1	Vancouver Canucks		Ranford	16,087	1–0–0	2	
2	October 7	Edmonton Oilers	6 – 5	Los Angeles Kings		Ranford	16,005	2–0–0	4	
3	October 11	Vancouver Canucks	5 – 2	Edmonton Oilers		Ranford	16,047	2–1–0	4	
4	October 13	Boston Bruins	3 – 3	Edmonton Oilers	OT	Ranford	16,094	2–1–1	5	
5	October 15	Los Angeles Kings	5 – 4	Edmonton Oilers	OT	Ranford	17,503	2–2–1	5	
6	October 18	Winnipeg Jets	2 – 7	Edmonton Oilers		Ranford	15,676	3–2–1	7	
7	October 20	Boston Bruins	3 – 0	Edmonton Oilers		Ranford	16,886	3–3–1	7	
8	October 22	Edmonton Oilers	4 – 5	Winnipeg Jets		Ranford	12,654	3–4–1	7	
9	October 24	Edmonton Oilers	3 – 3	New York Islanders	OT	Ranford	10,409	3–4–2	8	
10	October 25	Edmonton Oilers	3 – 3	New York Rangers	OT	Ranford	15,501	3–4–3	9	
11	October 28	Edmonton Oilers	6 – 3	Quebec Nordiques		Ranford	15,399	4–4–3	11	
12	October 29	Edmonton Oilers	4 – 5	Montreal Canadiens		Fuhr	16,564	4–5–3	11	

November: 8–5–2 (home: 4–1–2; road: 4–4–0)

#	Date	Visitor	Score	Home	OT	Decision	Attendance	Record	Points	Recap
13	November 1	New Jersey Devils	6 – 6	Edmonton Oilers	OT	Fuhr	15,728	4–5–4	12	
14	November 3	Calgary Flames	2 – 5	Edmonton Oilers		Fuhr	17,503	5–5–4	14	
15	November 4	Pittsburgh Penguins	3 – 1	Edmonton Oilers		Fuhr	17,503	5–6–4	14	
16	November 6	Edmonton Oilers	1 – 5	Calgary Flames		Fuhr	20,107	5–7–4	14	
17	November 9	Edmonton Oilers	2 – 6	Boston Bruins		Fuhr	14,076	5–8–4	14	
18	November 11	Edmonton Oilers	5 – 3	Washington Capitals		Ranford	18,130	6–8–4	16	
19	November 12	Edmonton Oilers	5 – 6	Buffalo Sabres		Fuhr	15,138	6–9–4	16	
20	November 15	Los Angeles Kings	2 – 2	Edmonton Oilers	OT	Ranford	16,647	6–9–5	17	
21	November 17	Buffalo Sabres	0 – 3	Edmonton Oilers		Fuhr	17,167	7–9–5	19	
22	November 19	Chicago Blackhawks	4 – 5	Edmonton Oilers	OT	Fuhr	16,675	8–9–5	21	
23	November 21	Vancouver Canucks	3 – 4	Edmonton Oilers		Ranford	17,228	9–9–5	23	
24	November 24	Edmonton Oilers	1 – 5	Philadelphia Flyers		Ranford	17,423	9–10–5	23	
25	November 25	Edmonton Oilers	7 – 2	New York Islanders		Fuhr	13,200	10–10–5	25	
26	November 27	Edmonton Oilers	6 – 2	Detroit Red Wings		Fuhr	19,875	11–10–5	27	
27	November 30	Edmonton Oilers	7 – 6	Los Angeles Kings		Fuhr	16,005	12–10–5	29	

December: 9–2–2 (home: 8–0–1; road: 1–2–1)

#	Date	Visitor	Score	Home	OT	Decision	Attendance	Record	Points	Recap
28	December 2	Minnesota North Stars	1 – 6	Edmonton Oilers		Ranford	17,211	13–10–5	31	
29	December 3	Toronto Maple Leafs	3 – 5	Edmonton Oilers		Ranford	16,321	14–10–5	33	
30	December 8	Los Angeles Kings	4 – 5	Edmonton Oilers	OT	Fuhr	17,503	15–10–5	35	
31	December 11	Calgary Flames	3 – 3	Edmonton Oilers	OT	Fuhr	16,649	15–10–6	36	
32	December 13	Quebec Nordiques	1 – 5	Edmonton Oilers		Ranford	16,213	16–10–6	38	
33	December 16	Edmonton Oilers	3 – 3	St. Louis Blues	OT	Fuhr	13,807	16–10–7	39	
34	December 17	Edmonton Oilers	5 – 6	Chicago Blackhawks		Ranford	17,591	16–11–7	39	
35	December 19	Edmonton Oilers	5 – 0	Minnesota North Stars		Ranford	10,724	17–11–7	41	
36	December 21	Winnipeg Jets	2 – 3	Edmonton Oilers		Ranford	16,521	18–11–7	43	
37	December 23	Calgary Flames	1 – 2	Edmonton Oilers		Ranford	17,503	19–11–7	45	
38	December 27	Philadelphia Flyers	1 – 2	Edmonton Oilers		Ranford	17,503	20–11–7	47	
39	December 29	Montreal Canadiens	2 – 6	Edmonton Oilers		Ranford	17,503	21–11–7	49	
40	December 31	Edmonton Oilers	2 – 3	Winnipeg Jets		Ranford	13,435	21–12–7	49	

January: 5–5–3 (home: 3–3–1; road: 2–2–2)

#	Date	Visitor	Score	Home	OT	Decision	Attendance	Record	Points	Recap
41	January 2	Edmonton Oilers	6 – 4	St. Louis Blues		Ranford	14,530	22–12–7	51	
42	January 3	Edmonton Oilers	2 – 3	Chicago Blackhawks		Ranford	17,616	22–13–7	51	
43	January 6	Hartford Whalers	4 – 4	Edmonton Oilers	OT	Ranford	17,385	22–13–8	52	
44	January 7	Calgary Flames	3 – 1	Edmonton Oilers		Ranford	17,503	22–14–8	52	
45	January 9	Edmonton Oilers	3 – 2	Calgary Flames	OT	Ranford	20,107	23–14–8	54	
46	January 11	Edmonton Oilers	3 – 3	Los Angeles Kings	OT	Ranford	16,005	23–14–9	55	
47	January 16	Detroit Red Wings	6 – 4	Edmonton Oilers		Ranford	17,191	23–15–9	55	
48	January 17	Winnipeg Jets	3 – 6	Edmonton Oilers		Ranford	16,664	24–15–9	57	
49	January 23	New York Rangers	4 – 3	Edmonton Oilers		Ranford	17,101	24–16–9	57	
50	January 25	Los Angeles Kings	6 – 7	Edmonton Oilers		Ranford	17,503	25–16–9	59	
51	January 27	Vancouver Canucks	2 – 6	Edmonton Oilers		Ranford	17,503	26–16–9	61	
52	January 30	Edmonton Oilers	4 – 4	Hartford Whalers	OT	Ranford	15,013	26–16–10	62	
53	January 31	Edmonton Oilers	5 – 7	Detroit Red Wings		Ranford	19,483	26–17–10	62	

February: 5–6–2 (home: 3–2–0; road: 2–4–2)

#	Date	Visitor	Score	Home	OT	Decision	Attendance	Record	Points	Recap
54	February 2	Edmonton Oilers	3 – 6	Pittsburgh Penguins		Exelby	16,236	26–18–10	62	
55	February 4	Edmonton Oilers	5 – 4	Washington Capitals	OT	Ranford	18,130	27–18–10	64	
56	February 6	Edmonton Oilers	2 – 2	New Jersey Devils	OT	Reddick	15,185	27–18–11	65	
57	February 7	Edmonton Oilers	2 – 5	New York Rangers		Reddick	16,227	27–19–11	65	
58	February 11	Winnipeg Jets	4 – 7	Edmonton Oilers		Reddick	17,228	28–19–11	67	
59	February 14	Washington Capitals	4 – 3	Edmonton Oilers		Reddick	16,145	28–20–11	67	
60	February 16	Edmonton Oilers	2 – 2	Vancouver Canucks	OT	Reddick	15,862	28–20–12	68	
61	February 18	Minnesota North Stars	2 – 3	Edmonton Oilers		Reddick	17,503	29–20–12	70	
62	February 20	Edmonton Oilers	4 – 2	Vancouver Canucks		Reddick	15,555	30–20–12	72	
63	February 21	Buffalo Sabres	3 – 7	Edmonton Oilers		Reddick	16,374	31–20–12	74	
64	February 23	Toronto Maple Leafs	6 – 5	Edmonton Oilers		Reddick	17,503	31–21–12	74	
65	February 25	Edmonton Oilers	4 – 10	Calgary Flames		Reddick	20,107	31–22–12	74	
66	February 28	Edmonton Oilers	2 – 4	Los Angeles Kings		Ranford	16,005	31–23–12	74	

March: 6–5–2 (home: 4–2–1; road: 2–3–1)

#	Date	Visitor	Score	Home	OT	Decision	Attendance	Record	Points	Recap
67	March 3	Philadelphia Flyers	3 – 5	Edmonton Oilers		Fuhr	17,503	32–23–12	76	
68	March 4	Vancouver Canucks	3 – 6	Edmonton Oilers		Ranford	17,197	33–23–12	78	
69	March 6	Pittsburgh Penguins	3 – 4	Edmonton Oilers	OT	Fuhr	17,042	34–23–12	80	
70	March 9	Edmonton Oilers	5 – 7	Winnipeg Jets		Fuhr	15,564	34–24–12	80	
71	March 10	Edmonton Oilers	2 – 3	Toronto Maple Leafs		Ranford	16,382	34–25–12	80	
72	March 13	Edmonton Oilers	4 – 1	Quebec Nordiques		Ranford	15,174	35–25–12	82	
73	March 14	Edmonton Oilers	3 – 3	Montreal Canadiens	OT	Ranford	17,915	35–25–13	83	
74	March 17	New Jersey Devils	4 – 1	Edmonton Oilers		Ranford	17,503	35–26–13	83	
75	March 18	Hartford Whalers	3 – 1	Edmonton Oilers		Ranford	17,127	35–27–13	83	
76	March 21	St. Louis Blues	6 – 8	Edmonton Oilers		Reddick	17,332	36–27–13	85	
77	March 24	New York Islanders	5 – 5	Edmonton Oilers	OT	Ranford	17,503	36–27–14	86	
78	March 27	Edmonton Oilers	4 – 1	Vancouver Canucks		Ranford	14,960	37–27–14	88	
79	March 30	Edmonton Oilers	2 – 6	Calgary Flames		Fuhr	20,107	37–28–14	88	

April: 1–0–0 (home: 0–0–0; road: 1–0–0)

#	Date	Visitor	Score	Home	OT	Decision	Attendance	Record	Points	Recap
80	April 1	Edmonton Oilers	4 – 2	Winnipeg Jets		Ranford	15,509	38–28–14	90	

Legend: Win (2 points) Loss (0 points) Tie (1 point)

== Playoffs ==
1990 Stanley Cup playoffs
Smythe Division Semifinals - Oilers won series 4–3

#	Date	Visitor	Score	Home	OT	Decision	Attendance	Series	Recap
1	April 4	Winnipeg Jets	7 – 5	Edmonton Oilers		Ranford	16,423	0–1	
2	April 6	Winnipeg Jets	2 – 3	Edmonton Oilers	OT	Ranford	17,410	1–1	
3	April 8	Edmonton Oilers	1 – 2	Winnipeg Jets		Ranford	15,547	1–2	
4	April 10	Edmonton Oilers	3 – 4	Winnipeg Jets	2OT	Ranford	15,572	1–3	
5	April 12	Winnipeg Jets	3 – 4	Edmonton Oilers		Ranford	17,503	2–3	
6	April 14	Edmonton Oilers	4 – 3	Winnipeg Jets		Ranford	15,567	3–3	
7	April 16	Winnipeg Jets	1 – 4	Edmonton Oilers		Ranford	17,503	4–3	

Smythe Division Finals - Oilers won series 4–0

#	Date	Visitor	Score	Home	OT	Decision	Attendance	Series	Recap
1	April 18	Los Angeles Kings	0 – 7	Edmonton Oilers		Ranford	16,778	1–0	
2	April 20	Los Angeles Kings	1 – 6	Edmonton Oilers		Ranford	17,503	2–0	
3	April 22	Edmonton Oilers	5 – 4	Los Angeles Kings		Ranford	16,005	3–0	
4	April 24	Edmonton Oilers	6 – 5	Los Angeles Kings	OT	Ranford	16,005	4–0	

Campbell Conference Finals - Oilers won series 4–2

#	Date	Visitor	Score	Home	OT	Decision	Attendance	Series	Recap
1	May 2	Chicago Blackhawks	2 – 5	Edmonton Oilers		Ranford	17,228	1–0	
2	May 4	Chicago Blackhawks	4 – 3	Edmonton Oilers		Ranford	17,503	1–1	
3	May 6	Edmonton Oilers	1 – 5	Chicago Blackhawks		Ranford	18,472	1–2	
4	May 8	Edmonton Oilers	4 – 2	Chicago Blackhawks		Ranford	18,472	2–2	
5	May 10	Chicago Blackhawks	3 – 4	Edmonton Oilers		Ranford	17,503	3–2	
6	May 12	Edmonton Oilers	8 – 4	Chicago Blackhawks		Ranford	18,472	4–2	

Stanley Cup Final - Oilers won series 4–1

#	Date	Visitor	Score	Home	OT	Decision	Attendance	Series	Recap
1	May 15	Edmonton Oilers	3 – 2	Boston Bruins	3OT	Ranford	14,448	1–0	
2	May 18	Edmonton Oilers	7 – 2	Boston Bruins		Ranford	14,448	2–0	
3	May 20	Boston Bruins	2 – 1	Edmonton Oilers		Ranford	17,503	2–1	
4	May 22	Boston Bruins	1 – 5	Edmonton Oilers		Ranford	17,503	3–1	
5	May 24	Edmonton Oilers	4 – 1	Boston Bruins		Ranford	14,448	4–1	

Legend: Win Loss

== Season stats ==
=== Scoring leaders ===
Player	GP	G	A	Pts	PIM
Mark Messier	79	45	84	129	79
Jari Kurri	78	33	60	93	48
Glenn Anderson	73	34	38	72	107
Esa Tikkanen	79	30	33	63	161
Craig Simpson	80	29	32	61	180

=== Goaltending ===
Player	GP	TOI	W	L	T	GA	SO	Save %	GAA
Pokey Reddick	11	604	5	4	2	31	0	.890	3.08
Bill Ranford	56	3107	24	16	9	165	1	.887	3.19
Grant Fuhr	21	1081	9	7	3	70	1	.868	3.89
Randy Exelby	1	60	0	1	0	5	0	.833	5.00
Mike Greenlay	2	20	0	0	0	4	0	.765	12.00

== Playoff stats ==
=== Scoring leaders ===
Player	GP	G	A	Pts	PIM
Craig Simpson	22	16	15	31	8
Mark Messier	22	9	22	31	20
Jari Kurri	22	10	15	25	18
Esa Tikkanen	22	13	11	24	26
Glenn Anderson	22	10	12	22	20

=== Goaltending ===
Player	GP	TOI	W	L	GA	SO	Save %	GAA
Pokey Reddick	1	2	0	0	0	0	1.000	0.00
Bill Ranford	22	1401	16	6	59	1	.912	2.53

== Awards and records ==
=== Milestones ===
Regular Season
Player	Milestone	Reached
Geoff Smith	1st NHL Game	October 5, 1989
Esa Tikkanen	400th NHL PIM	October 5, 1989
Peter Eriksson	1st NHL Game; 1st NHL Goal; 1st NHL Point	October 11, 1989
Francois Leroux	1st NHL Assist; 1st NHL Point	October 11, 1989
Trevor Sim	1st NHL Game; 1st NHL Assist; 1st NHL Point	October 18, 1989
Craig Simpson	300th NHL Game	October 18, 1989
Geoff Smith	1st NHL Goal; 1st NHL Point	October 18, 1989
Geoff Smith	1st NHL Assist	October 24, 1989
Peter Eriksson	1st NHL Assist	October 29, 1989
Kevin McClelland	500th NHL Game	November 1, 1989
Dave Brown	1,100th NHL PIM	November 6, 1989
Kelly Buchberger	100th NHL Game	November 6, 1989
Craig Simpson	300th NHL PIM	November 11, 1989
Esa Tikkanen	100th NHL Goal	November 11, 1989
Glenn Anderson	700th NHL Game	November 12, 1989
Petr Klima	300th NHL Game	November 15, 1989
Petr Klima	100th NHL Assist	November 17, 1989
Steve Smith	100th NHL Assist	November 19, 1989
Mark Messier	11th NHL Hat-trick	November 21, 1989
Joe Murphy	100th NHL Game	November 21, 1989
Grant Fuhr	400th NHL Game	November 24, 1989
Jari Kurri	700th NHL Game	November 25, 1989
Normand Lacombe	??? NHL Hat-trick	November 25, 1989
Glenn Anderson	20th NHL Hat-trick	December 2, 1989
Charlie Huddy	600th NHL Game	December 3, 1989
Adam Graves	100th NHL PIM	December 8, 1989
Glenn Anderson	800th NHL Point	December 11, 1989
Adam Graves	1st NHL Hat-trick	December 17, 1989
Bill Ranford	100th NHL Game	December 17, 1989
Adam Graves	100th NHL Game	December 19, 1989
Kelly Buchberger	400th NHL PIM	December 27, 1989
Mark Messier	900th NHL Point	December 29, 1989
Jari Kurri	1,000th NHL Point	January 2, 1990
Kevin Lowe	800th NHL Game	January 3, 1990
Esa Tikkanen	300th NHL Game	January 6, 1990
Mark Messier	12th NHL Hat-trick	January 17, 1990
Vladimir Ruzicka	1st NHL Game	January 17, 1990
Steve Smith	800th NHL PIM	January 17, 1990
Kevin Lowe	900th NHL PIM	January 23, 1990
Vladimir Ruzicka	1st NHL Goal; 1st NHL Assist; 1st NHL Point	January 25, 1990
Joe Murphy	100th NHL PIM	February 2, 1990
Esa Tikkanen	500th NHL PIM	February 2, 1990
Mike Greenlay	1st NHL Game	February 25, 1990
Craig Muni	300th NHL PIM	February 28, 1990
Craig Simpson	400th NHL PIM	February 28, 1990
Jeff Beukeboom	500th NHL PIM	March 3, 1990
Petr Klima	200th NHL PIM	March 3, 1990
Mark Messier	3rd Four-Goal NHL Game; 13th NHL Hat-trick	March 3, 1990
Glenn Anderson	700th NHL PIM	March 4, 1990
Martin Gelinas	1st NHL Hat-trick	March 4, 1990
Craig Simpson	??? NHL Gordie Howe hat trick	March 4, 1990
Esa Tikkanen	300th NHL Point	March 4, 1990
Dave Brown	1,200th NHL PIM	March 9, 1990
Adam Graves	200th NHL PIM	March 9, 1990
Craig MacTavish	600th NHL Game	March 9, 1990
Craig Muni	300th NHL Game	March 9, 1990
Steve Smith	300th NHL Game	March 13, 1990
Craig Simpson	300th NHL Point	March 14, 1990
Randy Gregg	300th NHL PIM	March 21, 1990
Mark Lamb	100th NHL Game	March 21, 1990

Playoffs
Player	Milestone	Reached
Martin Gelinas	1st NHL Game	April 4, 1990
Kelly Buchberger	1st NHL Assist; 1st NHL Point	April 6, 1990
Charlie Huddy	100th NHL Game	April 6, 1990
Mark Lamb	1st NHL Goal	April 6, 1990
Joe Murphy	1st NHL Goal	April 6, 1990
Craig MacTavish	100th NHL PIM	April 6, 1990
Bill Ranford	1st NHL Win	April 6, 1990
Geoff Smith	1st NHL Game	April 8, 1990
Steve Smith	50th NHL Game	April 8, 1990
Bill Ranford	1st NHL Assist; 1st NHL Point	April 10, 1990
Jari Kurri	100th NHL Assist	April 12, 1990
Esa Tikkanen	50th NHL Point	April 12, 1990
Glenn Anderson	150th NHL Point	April 16, 1990
Martin Gelinas	1st NHL Goal; 1st NHL Assist; 1st NHL Point	April 18, 1990
Adam Graves	1st NHL Assist; 1st NHL Point	April 18, 1990
Charlie Huddy	50th NHL Assist	April 18, 1990
Bill Ranford	1st NHL Shutout	April 18, 1990
Randy Gregg	50th NHL Point	April 20, 1990
Steve Smith	150th NHL PIM	April 20, 1990
Adam Graves	1st NHL Goal	April 22, 1990
Craig Muni	50th NHL Game	April 22, 1990
Craig MacTavish	100th NHL Game	May 8, 1990
Anatoli Semenov	1st NHL Game	May 8, 1990
Mark Messier	150th NHL PIM	May 12, 1990
Jari Kurri	7th NHL Hat-trick; 200th NHL Point	May 18, 1990
Petr Klima	50th NHL Game	May 20, 1990
Jari Kurri	100th NHL PIM	May 20, 1990
Craig Simpson	50th NHL Point	May 22, 1990
Mark Messier	200th NHL Point	May 24, 1990

== Transactions ==
=== Trades ===
June 17, 1989	To Boston Bruins 3rd-round pick in 1989	To Edmonton Oilers Tommy Lehman
June 17, 1989	To New Jersey Devils 1st-round pick in 1989	To Edmonton Oilers Corey Foster
September 28, 1989	To Winnipeg Jets Future considerations	To Edmonton Oilers Pokey Reddick
October 2, 1989	To Montreal Canadiens Cash	To Edmonton Oilers Randy Exelby
October 10, 1989	To Hartford Whalers Jim Ennis	To Edmonton Oilers Norm Maciver
November 2, 1989	To Detroit Red Wings Kevin McClelland; Jimmy Carson; 5th-round pick in 1991	To Edmonton Oilers Petr Klima; Jeff Sharples; Joe Murphy; Adam Graves
December 21, 1989	To Toronto Maple Leafs 4th-round pick in 1990	To Edmonton Oilers Vladimir Ruzicka
January 5, 1990	To Philadelphia Flyers Normand Lacombe	To Edmonton Oilers 4th-round pick in 1990
January 19, 1990	To New York Rangers Todd Charlesworth	To Edmonton Oilers Denis Larocque
March 6, 1990	To New Jersey Devils Jeff Sharples	To Edmonton Oilers Reijo Ruotsalainen
March 6, 1990	To Hartford Whalers Cam Brauer	To Edmonton Oilers Marc Laforge
March 6, 1990	To Pittsburgh Penguins Brian Wilks	To Edmonton Oilers Future considerations

=== Players acquired ===
Date	Player	Former team
June 21, 1989	Todd Charlesworth	Pittsburgh Penguins
February 1, 1990	Bruce Bell	Detroit Red Wings

=== Players lost ===
Date	Player	New team
June 20, 1989	Clark Donatelli	Minnesota North Stars
July 11, 1989	Gary Emmons	Minnesota North Stars
October 9, 1989	Daryl Reaugh	Hartford Whalers
October 30, 1989	Nick Fotiu	New Haven Nighthawks (AHL)
February 7, 1990	Len Barrie	Philadelphia Flyers

== Draft picks ==
Edmonton's draft picks at the 1989 NHL entry draft

Round	#	Player	Nationality	College/Junior/Club team (League)
1	15	Jason Soules	Canada	Niagara Falls Thunder (OHL)
2	36	Richard Borgo	Canada	Kitchener Rangers (OHL)
4	78	Josef Beranek	Czechoslovakia	Chemopetrol Litvinov (CSSR)
5	92	Peter White	Canada	Michigan State University (NCAA)
6	120	Anatoli Semenov	Soviet Union	Dynamo Moscow (USSR)
7	140	Davis Payne	Canada	Michigan Tech (NCAA)
7	141	Sergei Yashin	Soviet Union	Dynamo Moscow (USSR)
8	162	Darcy Martini	Canada	Michigan Tech (NCAA)
11	225	Roman Bozek	Czechoslovakia	HC České Budějovice (CSSR)
S	20	Dave Aiken	United States	University of New Hampshire (Hockey East)
