= 1989–90 Winnipeg Jets season =

NHL hockey team season

1989–90 Winnipeg Jets
- Division: 3rd Smythe
- Conference: 4th Campbell
- 1989–90 record: 37–32–11
- Home record: 22–13–5
- Road record: 15–19–6
- Goals for: 298
- Goals against: 290

Team information
- General manager: Mike Smith
- Coach: Bob Murdoch
- Captain: Randy Carlyle, Dale Hawerchuk, and Thomas Steen
- Arena: Winnipeg Arena

Team leaders
- Goals: Pat Elynuik and Paul Fenton (32)
- Assists: Dale Hawerchuk (55)
- Points: Dale Hawerchuk (81)
- Penalty minutes: Shawn Cronin (243)
- Plus/minus: Peter Taglianetti (+20)
- Wins: Bob Essensa (18)
- Goals against average: Bob Essensa (3.15)

The 1989–90 Winnipeg Jets season was the 18th season of the Winnipeg Jets, their 11th season in the National Hockey League (NHL). The Jets placed third in the Smythe to qualify for the playoffs. The Jets lost to the Edmonton Oilers in the first round.

== Offseason ==
During the previous season, the Jets replaced general manager John Ferguson with Mike Smith, while head coach Dan Maloney was replaced with Rick Bowness on an interim basis. On May 25, 1989, the Jets named Bob Murdoch as their new head coach. Murdoch had previous head coaching experience in the NHL, as he was the Chicago Blackhawks head coach for the 1987-88 season, going 30-41-9.

At the 1989 NHL entry draft held on June 17, 1989, the Jets held the fourth overall selection, and drafted Stu Barnes from the Tri-City Americans of the WHL. Barnes had 59 goals and 141 points with the Americans during the 1988-89 season. Other notable players the Jets selected were Kris Draper in the third round, and Dan Bylsma in the sixth round.

The Jets were also busy with trades at the 1989 NHL entry draft, as they acquired Randy Cunneyworth, Rick Tabaracci and Dave McLlwain from the Pittsburgh Penguins for Randy Gilhen, Andrew McBain and Jim Kyte. Cunneyworth, was coming off a 25-goal, 44-point season in 70 games in 1988-89, while McLlwain had a goal and three points in 24 games with the Penguins. Tabaracci posted a 24-20-5 record with a 4.24 GAA with the Cornwall Royals of the OHL.

The Jets also acquired Greg Paslawski and the St. Louis Blues third round pick in the 1989 NHL entry draft from the Blues for the Jets third round pick in the 1989 NHL entry draft and second round pick in the 1991 NHL entry draft, and Winnipeg traded away their third round pick in the 1990 NHL entry draft to the New Jersey Devils for the Devils third round pick in the 1989 NHL entry draft.

On July 22, 1989, the Jets acquired Shawn Cronin from the Philadelphia Flyers for future considerations. Cronin had three goals and 12 points with the Baltimore Skipjacks of the AHL during the 1988-89 season. On September 28, 1989, Winnipeg acquired Keith Acton and Pete Peeters from the Philadelphia Flyers for future considerations, however, both Acton and Peeters were returned to Philadelphia on October 3, 1989, for the Flyers fifth round draft pick in the 1991 NHL entry draft.

Also, on September 28, 1989, the Jets traded goaltender Pokey Reddick to the Edmonton Oilers for future considerations, and on October 2, 1989, Winnipeg selected Moe Mantha from the Philadelphia Flyers in the NHL Waiver Draft. Mantha, who played with the Jets from 1980 to 1984, split the 1988-89 season between the Minnesota North Stars and Philadelphia Flyers, scoring four goals and 18 points in 46 games.

The team chose to have three captains this season, naming veterans Randy Carlyle, Dale Hawerchuk and Thomas Steen. Hawerchuk had been the sole captain since 1984.

== Regular season ==
=== Final standings ===
Smythe Division
	GP	W	L	T	GF	GA	Pts
**Calgary Flames**	80	42	23	15	348	265	99
**Edmonton Oilers**	80	38	28	14	315	283	90
**Winnipeg Jets**	80	37	32	11	298	290	85
**Los Angeles Kings**	80	34	39	7	338	337	75
Vancouver Canucks	80	25	41	14	245	306	64

Note: GP = Games played, W = Wins, L = Losses, T = Ties, Pts = Points, GF = Goals for, GA = Goals against
Note: Teams that qualified for the playoffs are highlighted in bold.

Campbell Conference
R		Div	GP	W	L	T	GF	GA	Pts
**1**	**Calgary Flames**	**SMY**	**80**	**42**	**23**	**15**	**348**	**265**	**99**
**2**	**Edmonton Oilers**	**SMY**	**80**	**38**	**28**	**14**	**315**	**283**	**90**
**3**	**Chicago Blackhawks**	**NRS**	**80**	**41**	**33**	**6**	**316**	**294**	**88**
**4**	**Winnipeg Jets**	**SMY**	**80**	**37**	**32**	**11**	**298**	**290**	**85**
**5**	**St. Louis Blues**	**NRS**	**80**	**37**	**34**	**9**	**295**	**279**	**83**
**6**	**Toronto Maple Leafs**	**NRS**	**80**	**38**	**38**	**4**	**337**	**358**	**80**
**7**	**Minnesota North Stars**	**NRS**	**80**	**36**	**40**	**4**	**284**	**291**	**76**
**8**	**Los Angeles Kings**	**SMY**	**80**	**34**	**39**	**7**	**338**	**337**	**75**
9	Detroit Red Wings	NRS	80	28	38	14	288	323	70
10	Vancouver Canucks	SMY	80	25	41	14	245	306	64

Divisions: NRS – Norris, SMY – Smythe

bold – Qualified for playoffs

=== Record vs. opponents ===
==== Vs. Campbell Conference ====
**Vs. Smythe Division**

1989–90 NHL records
Team	**CGY**	**EDM**	**LAK**	**VAN**	**WIN**	**Total**
Calgary	—	4–3–1	4–3–1	5–1–2	3–5	**16–12–4**
Edmonton	3–4–1	—	4–2–2	6–1–1	5–3	**18–10–4**
Los Angeles	3–4–1	2–4–2	—	4–2–2	2–5–1	**11–15–6**
Vancouver	1–5–2	1–6–1	2–4–2	—	2–3–3	**6–18–8**
Winnipeg	5–3	3–5	5–2–1	3–3–2	—	**16–13–3**

**Vs. Norris Division**

1989–90 NHL records
Team	**CHI**	**DET**	**MIN**	**STL**	**TOR**	**Total**
Calgary	2–0–1	1–2	2–1	2–0–1	2–1	**9–4–2**
Edmonton	1–2	1–2	3–0	2–0–1	1–2	**8–6–1**
Los Angeles	1–2	2–1	1–2	2–1	1–2	**7–8–0**
Vancouver	1–2	1–1–1	2–1	1–2	1–2	**6–8–1**
Winnipeg	1–2	1–1–1	1–2	1–1–1	2–0–1	**6–6–3**

Vs. Wales Conference

**Vs. Adams Division**

1989–90 NHL records
Team	**BOS**	**BUF**	**HFD**	**MTL**	**QUE**	**Total**
Calgary	1–1–1	1–1–1	2–0–1	1–2	1–0–2	**6–4–5**
Edmonton	0–2–1	2–1	0–1–2	1–1–1	3–0	**6–5–4**
Los Angeles	1–2	1–2	1–2	1–1–1	3–0	**7–7–1**
Vancouver	2–1	0–2–1	1–2	1–2	0–2–1	**4–9–2**
Winnipeg	1–1–1	0–3	2–1	1–1–1	2–1	**6–7–2**

**Vs. Patrick Division**

1989–90 NHL records
Team	**NJD**	**NYI**	**NYR**	**PHI**	**PIT**	**WSH**	**Total**
Calgary	3–0	3–0	2–1	1–1–1	2–0–1	0–1–2	**11–3–4**
Edmonton	0–1–2	1–0–2	0–2–1	2–1	1–2	2–1	**6–7–5**
Los Angeles	1–2	1–2	2–1	0–3	2–1	3–0	**9–9–0**
Vancouver	3–0	1–2	0–3	1–0–2	2–1	2–0–1	**9–6–3**
Winnipeg	2–1	1–2	1–1–1	2–1	0–2–1	3–0	**9–7–2**

== Schedule and results ==
1989–90 regular season
October

Game	Result	Date	Score	Opponent	Record
1	L	October 6, 1989	1–4	New York Rangers (1989–90)	0–1–0
2	W	October 8, 1989	5–3	Philadelphia Flyers (1989–90)	1–1–0
3	L	October 10, 1989	1–5	@ Pittsburgh Penguins (1989–90)	1–2–0
4	L	October 12, 1989	4–5	@ Detroit Red Wings (1989–90)	1–3–0
5	W	October 14, 1989	5–1	@ Toronto Maple Leafs (1989–90)	2–3–0
6	L	October 18, 1989	2–7	@ Edmonton Oilers (1989–90)	2–4–0
7	L	October 20, 1989	2–4	Chicago Blackhawks (1989–90)	2–5–0
8	W	October 22, 1989	5–4	Edmonton Oilers (1989–90)	3–5–0
9	W	October 25, 1989	6–4	Washington Capitals (1989–90)	4–5–0
10	L	October 27, 1989	1–3	Los Angeles Kings (1989–90)	4–6–0
11	W	October 29, 1989	6–1	Los Angeles Kings (1989–90)	5–6–0

November

Game	Result	Date	Score	Opponent	Record
12	L	November 1, 1989	3–5	@ Calgary Flames (1989–90)	5–7–0
13	W	November 3, 1989	3–2	@ Vancouver Canucks (1989–90)	6–7–0
14	L	November 5, 1989	3–4 OT	@ Chicago Blackhawks (1989–90)	6–8–0
15	W	November 8, 1989	3–2 OT	Vancouver Canucks (1989–90)	7–8–0
16	L	November 10, 1989	2–4	Hartford Whalers (1989–90)	7–9–0
17	W	November 12, 1989	3–2	Calgary Flames (1989–90)	8–9–0
18	W	November 14, 1989	5–3	@ Quebec Nordiques (1989–90)	9–9–0
19	L	November 15, 1989	1–5	@ Montreal Canadiens (1989–90)	9–10–0
20	W	November 18, 1989	1–0 OT	@ Philadelphia Flyers (1989–90)	10–10–0
21	T	November 20, 1989	3–3 OT	@ New York Rangers (1989–90)	10–10–1
22	W	November 21, 1989	4–3	@ New York Islanders (1989–90)	11–10–1
23	L	November 23, 1989	2–5	St. Louis Blues (1989–90)	11–11–1
24	L	November 25, 1989	1–3	New Jersey Devils (1989–90)	11–12–1
25	W	November 29, 1989	5–4	New York Rangers (1989–90)	12–12–1

December

Game	Result	Date	Score	Opponent	Record
26	T	December 1, 1989	3–3 OT	Detroit Red Wings (1989–90)	12–12–2
27	L	December 2, 1989	3–6	New York Islanders (1989–90)	12–13–2
28	W	December 6, 1989	4–3	@ Calgary Flames (1989–90)	13–13–2
29	T	December 8, 1989	6–6 OT	Montreal Canadiens (1989–90)	13–13–3
30	W	December 10, 1989	4–1	Calgary Flames (1989–90)	14–13–3
31	T	December 13, 1989	3–3 OT	Vancouver Canucks (1989–90)	14–13–4
32	T	December 15, 1989	3–3 OT	@ Vancouver Canucks (1989–90)	14–13–5
33	L	December 19, 1989	5–9	@ Los Angeles Kings (1989–90)	14–14–5
34	L	December 21, 1989	2–3	@ Edmonton Oilers (1989–90)	14–15–5
35	W	December 26, 1989	5–3	Minnesota North Stars (1989–90)	15–15–5
36	W	December 29, 1989	2–1 OT	@ Calgary Flames (1989–90)	16–15–5
37	W	December 31, 1989	3–2	Edmonton Oilers (1989–90)	17–15–5

January

Game	Result	Date	Score	Opponent	Record
38	W	January 3, 1990	4–2	@ Hartford Whalers (1989–90)	18–15–5
39	L	January 4, 1990	2–4	@ Boston Bruins (1989–90)	18–16–5
40	L	January 6, 1990	3–5	@ Pittsburgh Penguins (1989–90)	18–17–5
41	W	January 8, 1990	4–3	@ New Jersey Devils (1989–90)	19–17–5
42	W	January 10, 1990	6–1	Washington Capitals (1989–90)	20–17–5
43	W	January 12, 1990	7–5	Detroit Red Wings (1989–90)	21–17–5
44	W	January 14, 1990	6–5	St. Louis Blues (1989–90)	22–17–5
45	L	January 16, 1990	6–8	Quebec Nordiques (1989–90)	22–18–5
46	L	January 17, 1990	3–6	@ Edmonton Oilers (1989–90)	22–19–5
47	L	January 19, 1990	4–6	New York Islanders (1989–90)	22–20–5
48	W	January 23, 1990	4–3	@ Washington Capitals (1989–90)	23–20–5
49	L	January 25, 1990	6–8	@ Philadelphia Flyers (1989–90)	23–21–5
50	T	January 27, 1990	3–3 OT	@ St. Louis Blues (1989–90)	23–21–6
51	L	January 29, 1990	2–4	@ Minnesota North Stars (1989–90)	23–22–6
52	T	January 31, 1990	5–5 OT	Toronto Maple Leafs (1989–90)	23–22–7

February

Game	Result	Date	Score	Opponent	Record
53	W	February 2, 1990	8–1	Vancouver Canucks (1989–90)	24–22–7
54	W	February 4, 1990	7–3	Chicago Blackhawks (1989–90)	25–22–7
55	L	February 6, 1990	3–5	@ Vancouver Canucks (1989–90)	25–23–7
56	W	February 8, 1990	5–1	@ Los Angeles Kings (1989–90)	26–23–7
57	L	February 11, 1990	4–7	@ Edmonton Oilers (1989–90)	26–24–7
58	W	February 14, 1990	3–2	Boston Bruins (1989–90)	27–24–7
59	T	February 16, 1990	3–3 OT	Pittsburgh Penguins (1989–90)	27–24–8
60	W	February 18, 1990	5–1	Calgary Flames (1989–90)	28–24–8
61	L	February 20, 1990	3–4 OT	Buffalo Sabres (1989–90)	28–25–8
62	W	February 22, 1990	4–2	@ New Jersey Devils (1989–90)	29–25–8
63	W	February 24, 1990	3–1	@ Hartford Whalers (1989–90)	30–25–8
64	L	February 25, 1990	1–3	@ Buffalo Sabres (1989–90)	30–26–8
65	L	February 27, 1990	3–8	@ Minnesota North Stars (1989–90)	30–27–8

March

Game	Result	Date	Score	Opponent	Record
66	W	March 2, 1990	9–3	Los Angeles Kings (1989–90)	31–27–8
67	W	March 4, 1990	5–2	Los Angeles Kings (1989–90)	32–27–8
68	W	March 7, 1990	6–3	Quebec Nordiques (1989–90)	33–27–8
69	W	March 9, 1990	7–5	Edmonton Oilers (1989–90)	34–27–8
70	L	March 11, 1990	4–6	Calgary Flames (1989–90)	34–28–8
71	L	March 12, 1990	4–5 OT	@ Calgary Flames (1989–90)	34–29–8
72	T	March 15, 1990	3–3 OT	@ Boston Bruins (1989–90)	34–29–9
73	W	March 17, 1990	5–4 OT	@ Toronto Maple Leafs (1989–90)	35–29–9
74	L	March 18, 1990	3–4 OT	@ Buffalo Sabres (1989–90)	35–30–9
75	W	March 21, 1990	3–2	Montreal Canadiens (1989–90)	36–30–9
76	L	March 23, 1990	2–4	Vancouver Canucks (1989–90)	36–31–9
77	T	March 25, 1990	3–3 OT	@ Vancouver Canucks (1989–90)	36–31–10
78	T	March 27, 1990	4–4 OT	@ Los Angeles Kings (1989–90)	36–31–11
79	W	March 29, 1990	1–0	@ Los Angeles Kings (1989–90)	37–31–11

April

Game	Result	Date	Score	Opponent	Record
80	L	April 1, 1990	2–4	Edmonton Oilers (1989–90)	37–32–11

Legend: Win (2 points) Loss (0 points) Tie (1 point)

== Playoffs ==
The Jets lost the Division Semi-finals (4-3) to the Edmonton Oilers.

== Player statistics ==
=== Regular season ===
Scoring

Player	Pos	GP	G	A	Pts	PIM	+/-	PPG	SHG	GWG
Dale Hawerchuk	C	79	26	55	81	60	-11	8	0	2
Pat Elynuik	RW	80	32	42	74	83	2	14	0	3
Thomas Steen	C	53	18	48	66	35	2	5	0	3
Brent Ashton	LW	79	22	34	56	37	4	3	0	5
Fredrik Olausson	D	77	9	46	55	32	-1	3	0	0
Dave McLlwain	C/RW	80	25	26	51	60	-1	1	7	2
Paul Fenton	LW	80	32	18	50	40	2	4	1	1
Doug Smail	LW	79	25	24	49	63	15	1	1	6
Greg Paslawski	RW	71	18	30	48	14	-4	7	0	6
Dave Ellett	D	77	17	29	46	96	-15	8	0	1
Teppo Numminen	D	79	11	32	43	20	-4	1	0	1
Moe Mantha	D	73	2	26	28	28	8	0	1	0
Laurie Boschman	C	66	10	17	27	103	-11	3	1	1
Doug Evans	LW	27	10	8	18	33	7	2	1	1
Randy Carlyle	D	53	3	15	18	50	8	2	0	0
Mark Kumpel	RW	56	8	9	17	21	-5	0	1	1
Paul MacDermid	RW	44	7	10	17	100	4	1	0	1
Phil Sykes	LW	48	9	6	15	26	-8	0	1	0
Randy Cunneyworth	LW	28	5	6	11	34	-7	2	0	1
Peter Taglianetti	D	49	3	6	9	136	20	0	0	1
Gord Donnelly	D	55	3	3	6	222	3	0	0	0
Shawn Cronin	D	61	0	4	4	243	-16	0	0	0
Brad Berry	D	12	1	2	3	6	-2	0	0	0
Brent Hughes	LW	11	1	2	3	33	-4	0	0	1
Danton Cole	C/RW	2	1	1	2	0	-1	0	0	0
Bob Essensa	G	36	0	2	2	0	0	0	0	0
Bryan Marchment	D	7	0	2	2	28	0	0	0	0
Brian McReynolds	C	9	0	2	2	4	-4	0	0	0
Daniel Berthiaume	G	24	0	1	1	6	0	0	0	0
Todd Flichel	D	3	0	1	1	2	0	0	0	0
Stephane Beauregard	G	19	0	0	0	4	0	0	0	0
Tom Draper	G	6	0	0	0	0	0	0	0	0
Brad Jones	LW	2	0	0	0	0	-2	0	0	0

Goaltending

Player	MIN	GP	W	L	T	GA	GAA	SO	SA	SV	SV%
Bob Essensa	2035	36	18	9	5	107	3.15	1	988	881	.892
Daniel Berthiaume	1387	24	10	11	3	86	3.72	1	667	581	.871
Stephane Beauregard	1079	19	7	8	3	59	3.28	0	570	511	.896
Tom Draper	359	6	2	4	0	26	4.35	0	153	127	.830
Team:	4860	80	37	32	11	278	3.43	2	2378	2100	.883

=== Playoffs ===
Scoring

Player	Pos	GP	G	A	Pts	PIM	PPG	SHG	GWG
Dale Hawerchuk	C	7	3	5	8	2	0	0	1
Thomas Steen	C	7	2	5	7	16	1	0	0
Pat Elynuik	RW	7	2	4	6	2	0	0	0
Moe Mantha	D	7	1	5	6	2	0	0	0
Brent Ashton	LW	7	3	1	4	2	2	0	1
Doug Evans	LW	7	2	2	4	10	0	0	0
Greg Paslawski	RW	7	1	3	4	0	0	0	0
Teppo Numminen	D	7	1	2	3	10	0	0	0
Dave Ellett	D	7	2	0	2	6	2	0	1
Paul Fenton	LW	7	2	0	2	23	2	0	0
Mark Kumpel	RW	7	2	0	2	2	0	0	0
Paul MacDermid	RW	7	0	2	2	8	0	0	0
Fredrik Olausson	D	7	0	2	2	2	0	0	0
Doug Smail	LW	5	1	0	1	0	0	0	0
Gord Donnelly	D	6	0	1	1	8	0	0	0
Dave McLlwain	C/RW	7	0	1	1	2	0	0	0
Stephane Beauregard	G	4	0	0	0	0	0	0	0
Brad Berry	D	1	0	0	0	0	0	0	0
Laurie Boschman	C	2	0	0	0	2	0	0	0
Shawn Cronin	D	5	0	0	0	7	0	0	0
Bob Essensa	G	4	0	0	0	0	0	0	0
Phil Sykes	LW	4	0	0	0	0	0	0	0
Peter Taglianetti	D	5	0	0	0	6	0	0	0

Goaltending

Player	MIN	GP	W	L	GA	GAA	SO	SA	SV	SV%
Bob Essensa	206	4	2	1	12	3.50	0	100	88	.880
Stephane Beauregard	238	4	1	3	12	3.03	0	105	93	.886
Team:	444	7	3	4	24	3.24	0	205	181	.883

Note:

Pos = Position;GP = Games played; G = Goals; A = Assists; Pts = Points; PIM = Penalty minutes; +/- = Plus/minus; PPG = Power-play goals; SHG = Short-handed goals; GWG = Game-winning goals
Pos = Position;GP = Games played; Min, TOI = Minutes played; W = Wins; L = Losses; T,T/OT = Ties; OTL = Overtime losses; GA = Goals-against; GAA = Goals-against average; SO = Shutouts; SA = Shots against; SV = Shots saved;SV% = Save percentage;

== Transactions ==
=== Trades ===
July 21, 1989	To Philadelphia Flyers Future Considerations	To Winnipeg Jets Shawn Cronin
September 28, 1989	To Edmonton Oilers Pokey Reddick	To Winnipeg Jets Future Considerations
September 28, 1989	To Philadelphia Flyers Future Considerations	To Winnipeg Jets Pete Peeters; Keith Acton
October 3, 1989	To Philadelphia Flyers Pete Peeters; Keith Acton	To Winnipeg Jets 5th round pick in 1991 - Juha Ylonen; Future Considerations
December 1, 1989	To Los Angeles Kings Brad Jones	To Winnipeg Jets Phil Sykes
December 13, 1989	To Hartford Whalers Randy Cunneyworth	To Winnipeg Jets Paul MacDermid
January 22, 1990	To St. Louis Blues Ron Wilson	To Winnipeg Jets Doug Evans
January 22, 1990	To Minnesota North Stars Daniel Berthiaume	To Winnipeg Jets Future Considerations
June 16, 1990	To Buffalo Sabres Dale Hawerchuk; 1st round pick in 1990 - Brad May	To Winnipeg Jets Scott Arniel; Phil Housley; Jeff Parker; 1st round pick in 1990 - Keith Tkachuk

=== Waivers ===
October 2, 1989	From Philadelphia Flyers Moe Mantha

=== Free agents ===
Player	Former team
Brian McReynolds	New York Rangers
Dallas Eakins	Washington Capitals
Bryan Erickson	Pittsburgh Penguins

Player	Former team
Alfie Turcotte	Boston Bruins

== Draft picks ==
Winnipeg selected the following players at the 1989 NHL entry draft, which was held at the Met Center in Bloomington, Minnesota, on June 17, 1989.

=== NHL amateur draft ===
Round	Pick	Player	Nationality	College/Junior/Club team
1	4	Stu Barnes (C)	Canada	Tri-City Americans (WHL)
2	25	Dan Ratushny (D)	United States	Cornell University (NCAA)
3	46	Jason Cirone (C)	Italy	Cornwall Royals (OHL)
3	62	Kris Draper (C)	Canada	Canadian National Team
4	64	Mark Brownschidle (D)	United States	Boston University (NCAA)
4	69	Allain Roy (G)	Canada	Harvard University (NCAA)
6	109	Dan Bylsma (RW)	United States	Bowling Green State University (NCAA)
7	130	Pekka Peltola (LW)	Finland	HPK Hameenlinna (SM-liiga)
7	131	Doug Evans (D)	Canada	University of Michigan (NCAA)
8	151	Jim Solly (LW)	Canada	Bowling Green State University (NCAA)
9	172	Stephane Gauvin (LW)	Canada	Cornell University (NCAA)
10	193	Joe Larson (FWD)	United States	Minnetonka (MN) High School
11	214	Brad Podiak (C)	United States	Wayzata (MN) High School
12	235	Evgeny Davydov (LW)	Soviet Union	HC CSKA Moscow
12	240	Sergei Kharin (C)	Soviet Union	Krylya Sovetov Moscow
S	4	Peter Hankinson (F)	United States	University of Minnesota (WCHA)
S	9	Jon Anderson (LW)	United States	University of Minnesota (WCHA)

== See also ==
- 1989–90 NHL season
