= 1986–87 Edmonton Oilers season =

NHL team season

1986–87 Edmonton Oilers
- Stanley Cup champions
- Presidents' Trophy winners
- Campbell Conference champions
- Smythe Division champions
- Division: 1st Smythe
- Conference: 1st Campbell
- 1986–87 record: 50–24–6
- Home record: 29–6–5
- Road record: 21–18–1
- Goals for: 372
- Goals against: 284

Team information
- General manager: Glen Sather
- Coach: Glen Sather
- Captain: Wayne Gretzky
- Alternate captains: Kevin Lowe; Mark Messier
- Arena: Northlands Coliseum
- Average attendance: 17,503 (100%)
- Minor league affiliates: Nova Scotia Oilers (AHL); Muskegon Lumberjacks (IHL)

Team leaders
- Goals: Wayne Gretzky (62)
- Assists: Wayne Gretzky (121)
- Points: Wayne Gretzky (183)
- Penalty minutes: Kevin McClelland (238)
- Plus/minus: Wayne Gretzky (+70)
- Wins: Andy Moog (28)
- Goals against average: Grant Fuhr (3.44)

The 1986–87 Edmonton Oilers season was the Oilers' eighth season in the National Hockey League, following a playoff loss to the Calgary Flames the season before, ending the Oilers' bid for a third-straight Stanley Cup. Edmonton won the Presidents' Trophy, as they finished with 106 points and won their sixth-straight Smythe Division title. There was no postseason upset this year, as the Oilers defeated the Philadelphia Flyers in the Stanley Cup Final to win their third Stanley Cup in four years, although the Flyers did push the Final series to seven games.

As of 2026 this is the Oilers' most recent regular season division title, making it the longest such active drought in the North American major professional sports leagues.

== Regular season ==
Wayne Gretzky led the league with 183 points, earning his seventh consecutive Art Ross Trophy and his eighth straight Hart Trophy. Jari Kurri finished with 54 goals and 108 points, while Mark Messier had a career high 107 points. Esa Tikkanen had a break out season, getting 78 points, including 34 goals, along with 120 penalty minutes. Paul Coffey missed 21 games but still finished with 67 points to lead Oilers defencemen.

In goal, Grant Fuhr and Andy Moog once again split time, with Moog leading the team with 28 wins, while Fuhr posted a team best 3.44 GAA.

=== Season standings ===
Smythe Division
	GP	W	L	T	GF	GA	Pts
**Edmonton Oilers**	80	50	24	6	372	284	106
**Calgary Flames**	80	46	31	3	318	289	95
**Winnipeg Jets**	80	40	32	8	279	271	88
**Los Angeles Kings**	80	31	41	8	318	341	70
Vancouver Canucks	80	29	43	8	282	314	66

Note: GP = Games played, W = Wins, L = Losses, T = Ties, Pts = Points, GF = Goals for, GA = Goals against
Note: Teams that qualified for the playoffs are highlighted in bold.

=== Record vs. opponents ===
Smythe Division record vs. opponents

==== Vs. Campbell Conference ====
**Vs. Smythe Division**

1986–87 NHL records
Team	**CGY**	**EDM**	**LAK**	**VAN**	**WIN**	**Total**
Calgary	—	6–1–1	5–3	4–4	2–6	**17–14–1**
Edmonton	1–6–1	—	4–2–2	7–0–1	5–3	**17–11–4**
Los Angeles	3–5	2–4–2	—	2–5–1	3–5	**10–19–3**
Vancouver	4–4	0–7–1	5–2–1	—	3–5	**12–18–2**
Winnipeg	6–2	3–5	5–3	5–3	—	**19–13–0**

**Vs. Norris Division**

1986–87 NHL records
Team	**CHI**	**DET**	**MIN**	**STL**	**TOR**	**Total**
Calgary	3–0	1–2	1–1–1	1–2	2–1	**8–6–1**
Edmonton	1–2	3–0	2–0–1	3–0	2–1	**11–3–1**
Los Angeles	1–1–1	3–0	0–2–1	1–1–1	1–1–1	**6–5–4**
Vancouver	1–1–1	1–2	0–3	2–0–1	2–1	**6–7–2**
Winnipeg	0–3	1–1–1	2–1	1–0–2	1–2	**5–7–3**

**Vs. Wales Conference**

**Vs. Adams Division**

1986–87 NHL records
Team	**BOS**	**BUF**	**HFD**	**MTL**	**QUE**	**Total**
Calgary	1–2	3–0	2–1	1–2	2–1	**9–6–0**
Edmonton	1–2	2–1	2–1	3–0	3–0	**11–4–0**
Los Angeles	1–2	1–2	2–1	0–3	0–3	**4–11–0**
Vancouver	1–2	3–0	0–2–1	2–1	1–2	**7–7–1**
Winnipeg	1–2	2–1	1–1–1	1–2	1–0–2	**6–6–3**

**Vs. Patrick Division**

1986–87 NHL records
Team	**NJD**	**NYI**	**NYR**	**PHI**	**PIT**	**WSH**	**Total**
Calgary	2–1	2–0–1	2–1	2–1	2–1	2–1	**12–5–1**
Edmonton	2–1	2–0–1	3–0	1–2	2–1	1–2	**11–6–1**
Los Angeles	2–1	2–1	0–2–1	2–1	2–1	3–0	**11–6–1**
Vancouver	0–2–1	2–1	1–2	1–2	0–1–2	0–3	**4–11–3**
Winnipeg	3–0	1–1–1	2–1	1–2	2–1	1–1–1	**10–6–2**

== Schedule and results ==
1986–87 regular season
October: 8–4–0 (home: 6–0–0; road: 2–4–0)

#	Date	Visitor	Score	Home	OT	Decision	Attendance	Record	Points	Recap
1	October 9	Edmonton Oilers	1 – 2	Philadelphia Flyers		Fuhr		0–1–0	0	
2	October 11	Edmonton Oilers	5 – 4	Montreal Canadiens	OT	Moog		1–1–0	2	
3	October 12	Edmonton Oilers	3 – 5	Winnipeg Jets		Fuhr		1–2–0	2	
4	October 15	Quebec Nordiques	3 – 4	Edmonton Oilers		Moog		2–2–0	4	
5	October 17	Detroit Red Wings	3 – 4	Edmonton Oilers		Fuhr		3–2–0	6	
6	October 19	Edmonton Oilers	6 – 7	Los Angeles Kings		Moog		3–3–0	6	
7	October 21	Chicago Blackhawks	1 – 9	Edmonton Oilers		Fuhr		4–3–0	8	
8	October 22	Edmonton Oilers	3 – 6	Calgary Flames		Moog		4–4–0	8	
9	October 24	Boston Bruins	2 – 6	Edmonton Oilers		Moog		5–4–0	10	
10	October 26	Vancouver Canucks	2 – 3	Edmonton Oilers		Fuhr		6–4–0	12	
11	October 29	Washington Capitals	3 – 6	Edmonton Oilers		Moog		7–4–0	14	
12	October 31	Edmonton Oilers	6 – 2	Vancouver Canucks		Fuhr		8–4–0	16	

November: 6–6–1 (home: 4–2–1; road: 2–4–0)

#	Date	Visitor	Score	Home	OT	Decision	Attendance	Record	Points	Recap
13	November 2	Los Angeles Kings	5 – 5	Edmonton Oilers	OT	Moog		8–4–1	17	
14	November 5	Calgary Flames	3 – 1	Edmonton Oilers		Fuhr		8–5–1	17	
15	November 7	Edmonton Oilers	4 – 6	Calgary Flames		Fuhr		8–6–1	17	
16	November 8	Montreal Canadiens	3 – 4	Edmonton Oilers		Fuhr		9–6–1	19	
17	November 11	Edmonton Oilers	3 – 2	New York Islanders	OT	Fuhr		10–6–1	21	
18	November 13	Edmonton Oilers	3 – 4	Boston Bruins	OT	Fuhr		10–7–1	21	
19	November 15	Edmonton Oilers	2 – 6	Hartford Whalers		Moog		10–8–1	21	
20	November 16	Edmonton Oilers	8 – 6	New York Rangers		Fuhr		11–8–1	23	
21	November 19	New York Rangers	4 – 5	Edmonton Oilers	OT	Fuhr		12–8–1	25	
22	November 22	Vancouver Canucks	2 – 5	Edmonton Oilers		Moog		13–8–1	27	
23	November 24	Edmonton Oilers	5 – 6	Calgary Flames		Fuhr		13–9–1	27	
24	November 26	Winnipeg Jets	3 – 4	Edmonton Oilers		Moog		14–9–1	29	
25	November 28	Chicago Blackhawks	6 – 5	Edmonton Oilers	OT	Fuhr		14–10–1	29	

December: 10–2–1 (home: 5–1–1; road: 5–1–0)

#	Date	Visitor	Score	Home	OT	Decision	Attendance	Record	Points	Recap
26	December 3	New York Islanders	1 – 7	Edmonton Oilers		Moog		15–10–1	31	
27	December 5	Edmonton Oilers	4 – 2	Pittsburgh Penguins		Moog		16–10–1	33	
28	December 7	Edmonton Oilers	2 – 5	Philadelphia Flyers		Moog		16–11–1	33	
29	December 9	Edmonton Oilers	3 – 2	Minnesota North Stars		Fuhr		17–11–1	35	
30	December 10	Edmonton Oilers	7 – 4	Winnipeg Jets		Fuhr		18–11–1	37	
31	December 12	Winnipeg Jets	1 – 6	Edmonton Oilers		Fuhr		19–11–1	39	
32	December 14	Edmonton Oilers	4 – 2	Los Angeles Kings		Fuhr		20–11–1	41	
33	December 17	Quebec Nordiques	3 – 5	Edmonton Oilers		Fuhr		21–11–1	43	
34	December 19	Vancouver Canucks	2 – 4	Edmonton Oilers		Moog		22–11–1	45	
35	December 20	Los Angeles Kings	8 – 8	Edmonton Oilers	OT	Fuhr		22–11–2	46	
36	December 23	Winnipeg Jets	2 – 1	Edmonton Oilers		Moog		22–12–2	46	
37	December 28	Philadelphia Flyers	4 – 6	Edmonton Oilers		Moog		23–12–2	48	
38	December 30	Edmonton Oilers	7 – 3	Vancouver Canucks		Moog		24–12–2	50	

January: 10–2–2 (home: 5–1–1; road: 5–1–1)

#	Date	Visitor	Score	Home	OT	Decision	Attendance	Record	Points	Recap
39	January 3	Edmonton Oilers	8 – 1	Los Angeles Kings		Fuhr		25–12–2	52	
40	January 7	Los Angeles Kings	6 – 1	Edmonton Oilers		Fuhr		25–13–2	52	
41	January 9	St. Louis Blues	1 – 5	Edmonton Oilers		Moog		26–13–2	54	
42	January 11	Calgary Flames	3 – 5	Edmonton Oilers		Moog		27–13–2	56	
43	January 13	Edmonton Oilers	5 – 3	Detroit Red Wings		Fuhr		28–13–2	58	
44	January 15	Edmonton Oilers	4 – 1	Quebec Nordiques		Moog		29–13–2	60	
45	January 17	Edmonton Oilers	7 – 4	Toronto Maple Leafs		Moog		30–13–2	62	
46	January 18	Edmonton Oilers	5 – 6	Buffalo Sabres	OT	Moog		30–14–2	62	
47	January 21	Edmonton Oilers	5 – 3	Winnipeg Jets		Moog		31–14–2	64	
48	January 23	New York Rangers	4 – 7	Edmonton Oilers		Moog		32–14–2	66	
49	January 24	Pittsburgh Penguins	2 – 4	Edmonton Oilers		Moog		33–14–2	68	
50	January 27	Edmonton Oilers	4 – 4	Vancouver Canucks	OT	Moog		33–14–3	69	
51	January 28	Vancouver Canucks	3 – 7	Edmonton Oilers		Moog		34–14–3	71	
52	January 30	Minnesota North Stars	2 – 2	Edmonton Oilers	OT	Moog		34–14–4	72	

February: 4–6–1 (home: 2–1–1; road: 2–5–0)

#	Date	Visitor	Score	Home	OT	Decision	Attendance	Record	Points	Recap
53	February 1	Edmonton Oilers	4 – 6	Chicago Blackhawks		Moog		34–15–4	72	
54	February 3	Edmonton Oilers	4 – 2	St. Louis Blues		Fuhr		35–15–4	74	
55	February 4	Edmonton Oilers	6 – 5	Minnesota North Stars	OT	Fuhr		36–15–4	76	
56	February 6	New York Islanders	3 – 3	Edmonton Oilers	OT	Fuhr		36–15–5	77	
57	February 8	St. Louis Blues	2 – 6	Edmonton Oilers		Fuhr		37–15–5	79	
58	February 15	Washington Capitals	5 – 3	Edmonton Oilers		Moog		37–16–5	79	
59	February 18	Toronto Maple Leafs	2 – 9	Edmonton Oilers		Fuhr		38–16–5	81	
60	February 22	Edmonton Oilers	2 – 5	Winnipeg Jets		Fuhr		38–17–5	81	
61	February 24	Edmonton Oilers	2 – 5	Pittsburgh Penguins		Moog		38–18–5	81	
62	February 25	Edmonton Oilers	2 – 4	New Jersey Devils		Fuhr		38–19–5	81	
63	February 27	Edmonton Oilers	2 – 5	Washington Capitals		Fuhr		38–20–5	81	

March: 11–4–0 (home: 7–1–0; road: 4–3–0)

#	Date	Visitor	Score	Home	OT	Decision	Attendance	Record	Points	Recap
64	March 4	Edmonton Oilers	8 – 5	Vancouver Canucks		Moog		39–20–5	83	
65	March 6	Los Angeles Kings	3 – 9	Edmonton Oilers		Fuhr		40–20–5	85	
66	March 7	Montreal Canadiens	3 – 5	Edmonton Oilers		Moog		41–20–5	87	
67	March 11	Detroit Red Wings	3 – 6	Edmonton Oilers		Moog		42–20–5	89	
68	March 14	Buffalo Sabres	3 – 5	Edmonton Oilers		Moog		43–20–5	91	
69	March 15	Hartford Whalers	1 – 4	Edmonton Oilers		Moog		44–20–5	93	
70	March 17	New Jersey Devils	4 – 7	Edmonton Oilers		Moog		45–20–5	95	
71	March 19	Edmonton Oilers	4 – 5	Calgary Flames		Moog		45–21–5	95	
72	March 20	Calgary Flames	6 – 3	Edmonton Oilers		Fuhr		45–22–5	95	
73	March 23	Edmonton Oilers	7 – 6	New Jersey Devils		Moog		46–22–5	97	
74	March 25	Edmonton Oilers	5 – 3	Hartford Whalers		Fuhr		47–22–5	99	
75	March 26	Edmonton Oilers	1 – 4	Boston Bruins		Fuhr		47–23–5	99	
76	March 28	Edmonton Oilers	2 – 4	Toronto Maple Leafs		Moog		47–24–5	99	
77	March 29	Edmonton Oilers	3 – 2	Buffalo Sabres		Fuhr		48–24–5	101	
78	March 31	Winnipeg Jets	4 – 5	Edmonton Oilers	OT	Moog		49–24–5	103	

April: 1–0–1 (home: 0–0–1; road: 1–0–0)

#	Date	Visitor	Score	Home	OT	Decision	Attendance	Record	Points	Recap
79	April 2	Calgary Flames	4 – 4	Edmonton Oilers	OT	Fuhr		49–24–6	104	
80	April 4	Edmonton Oilers	7 – 3	Los Angeles Kings		Moog		50–24–6	106	

Legend: Win (2 points) Loss (0 points) Tie (1 point)

== Playoffs ==
In the playoffs, the Oilers got a bit of a scare in their opening game against the Los Angeles Kings, losing 5–2, but Edmonton rebounded, winning game two by a 13–3 score and won eight games in a row to get past the Kings and sweep the Winnipeg Jets in the process. Edmonton had little trouble getting past the Detroit Red Wings in the Conference Finals, defeating them in five games and faced the only other 100-point team in the NHL in the Stanley Cup Final, the Philadelphia Flyers. The series went the full seven games, with Edmonton winning the seventh and deciding game by a 3–1 score to capture their third Stanley Cup in the past four years. No Oiler won the Conn Smythe Trophy, as Ron Hextall of the Flyers won it despite failing to win the Stanley Cup.

1987 Stanley Cup playoffs
Smythe Division Semifinals vs. (S4) Los Angeles Kings; Oilers won series 4–1

#	Date	Visitor	Score	Home	OT	Decision	Attendance	Series	Recap
1	April 8	Los Angeles Kings	5 – 2	Edmonton Oilers		Fuhr		0–1	
2	April 9	Los Angeles Kings	3 – 13	Edmonton Oilers		Moog		1–1	
3	April 11	Edmonton Oilers	6 – 5	Los Angeles Kings		Moog		2–1	
4	April 12	Edmonton Oilers	6 – 3	Los Angeles Kings		Fuhr		3–1	
5	April 14	Los Angeles Kings	4 – 5	Edmonton Oilers		Fuhr		4–1	

Smythe Division Finals vs. (S3) Winnipeg Jets; Oilers won series 4–0

#	Date	Visitor	Score	Home	OT	Decision	Attendance	Series	Recap
1	April 21	Winnipeg Jets	2 – 3	Edmonton Oilers	OT	Fuhr		1–0	
2	April 23	Winnipeg Jets	3 – 5	Edmonton Oilers		Fuhr		2–0	
3	April 25	Edmonton Oilers	5 – 2	Winnipeg Jets		Fuhr		3–0	
4	April 27	Edmonton Oilers	4 – 2	Winnipeg Jets		Fuhr		4–0	

Campbell Conference Finals vs. (N2) Detroit Red Wings; Oilers won series 4–1

#	Date	Visitor	Score	Home	OT	Decision	Attendance	Series	Recap
1	May 5	Detroit Red Wings	3 – 1	Edmonton Oilers		Fuhr		0–1	
2	May 7	Detroit Red Wings	1 – 4	Edmonton Oilers		Fuhr		1–1	
3	May 9	Edmonton Oilers	2 – 1	Detroit Red Wings		Fuhr		2–1	
4	May 11	Edmonton Oilers	3 – 2	Detroit Red Wings		Fuhr		3–1	
5	May 13	Detroit Red Wings	3 – 6	Edmonton Oilers		Fuhr		4–1	

Stanley Cup Final vs. (P1) Philadelphia Flyers; Oilers won series 4–3

#	Date	Visitor	Score	Home	OT	Decision	Attendance	Series	Recap
1	May 17	Philadelphia Flyers	2 – 4	Edmonton Oilers		Fuhr		1–0	
2	May 20	Philadelphia Flyers	2 – 3	Edmonton Oilers	OT	Fuhr		2–0	
3	May 22	Edmonton Oilers	3 – 5	Philadelphia Flyers		Fuhr		2–1	
4	May 24	Edmonton Oilers	4 – 1	Philadelphia Flyers		Fuhr		3–1	
5	May 26	Philadelphia Flyers	4 – 3	Edmonton Oilers		Fuhr		3–2	
6	May 28	Edmonton Oilers	2 – 3	Philadelphia Flyers		Fuhr		3–3	
7	May 31	Philadelphia Flyers	1 – 3	Edmonton Oilers		Fuhr		4–3	

Legend: Win Loss

== Player statistics ==
=== Regular season ===
Scoring leaders

Player	GP	G	A	Pts	PIM
Wayne Gretzky	79	62	121	183	28
Jari Kurri	79	54	54	108	41
Mark Messier	77	37	70	107	73
Esa Tikkanen	76	34	44	78	120
Glenn Anderson	80	35	38	73	65

Goaltending

Player	GP	TOI	W	L	T	GA	SO	Save %	GAA
Grant Fuhr	44	2388	22	13	3	137	0	.881	3.44
Andy Moog	46	2461	28	11	3	144	0	.882	3.51

=== Playoffs ===
Scoring leaders

Player	GP	G	A	Pts	PIM
Wayne Gretzky	21	5	29	34	6
Mark Messier	21	12	16	28	16
Glenn Anderson	21	14	13	27	59
Jari Kurri	21	15	10	25	20
Kent Nilsson	21	6	13	19	6

Goaltending

Player	GP	TOI	W	L	GA	SO	Save %	GAA
Grant Fuhr	19	1148	14	5	47	0	.908	2.46
Andy Moog	2	120	2	0	8	0	.784	4.00

== Awards and records ==
=== Records ===
- 177: A new NHL record for most career points in a playoffs by Wayne Gretzky on April 9, 1987.
- 9: A new NHL record for most career short-handed goals in a playoffs by Mark Messier on May 22, 1987.
- 5: Tied NHL record for most game-winning goals in a playoffs by Jari Kurri on May 31, 1987.

=== Milestones ===
Regular Season
Player	Milestone	Reached
Mike Krushelnyski	300th NHL Game	October 15, 1986
Esa Tikkanen	1st NHL Hat-trick	October 15, 1986
Jeff Beukeboom	1st NHL Game; 1st NHL Assist; 1st NHL Point	October 17, 1986
Jari Kurri	17th NHL Hat-trick; 1st NHL Natural Hat-trick	October 17, 1986
Wayne Gretzky	38th NHL Hat-trick	October 24, 1986
Craig MacTavish	300th NHL Game	October 26, 1986
Mark Messier	500th NHL Game	October 26, 1986
Glenn Anderson	400th NHL PIM	October 31, 1986
Lee Fogolin	1,300th NHL PIM	October 31, 1986
Steve Smith	200th NHL PIM	October 31, 1986
Craig Muni	1st NHL Goal	November 8, 1986
Mike Krushelnyski	200th NHL PIM	November 11, 1986
Lee Fogolin	900th NHL Game	November 16, 1986
Wayne Gretzky	500th NHL Goal; 39th NHL Hat-trick	November 22, 1986
Dave Hunter	700th NHL PIM	November 24, 1986
Mark Napier	600th NHL Game	November 24, 1986
Esa Tikkanen	2nd NHL Hat-trick	November 24, 1986
Kevin McClelland	800th NHL PIM	December 3, 1986
Andy Moog	200th NHL Game	December 3, 1986
Steve Graves	1st NHL Goal; 1st NHL Point	December 5, 1986
Wayne Gretzky	1,400th NHL Point	December 5, 1986
Randy Gregg	100th NHL Assist	December 9, 1986
Wayne Gretzky	40th NHL Hat-trick	December 10, 1986
Raimo Summanen	100th NHL Game	December 10, 1986
Randy Gregg	200th NHL PIM	December 12, 1986
Wayne Gretzky	900th NHL Assist	December 12, 1986
Wayne Gretzky	41st NHL Hat-trick; 9th Four-Goal NHL Game; 6th NHL Natural Hat-trick	December 17, 1986
Randy Gregg	300th NHL Game	December 23, 1986
Paul Coffey	500th NHL Game	December 28, 1986
Craig MacTavish	100th NHL Assist	December 28, 1986
Jeff Beukeboom	1st NHL Goal	December 30, 1986
Kevin Lowe	200th NHL Assist	December 30, 1986
Marty McSorley	600th NHL PIM	December 30, 1986
Paul Coffey	200th NHL Goal	January 3, 1987
Kevin McClelland	300th NHL Game	January 9, 1987
Andy Moog	10th NHL Assist	January 11, 1987
Glenn Anderson	300th NHL Assist	January 13, 1987
Jari Kurri	700th NHL Point	January 13, 1987
Steve Smith	100th NHL Game	January 18, 1987
Wayne Gretzky	600th NHL Game	January 21, 1987
Mark Messier	600th NHL Point	January 23, 1987
Steve Smith	300th NHL PIM	January 23, 1987
Wayne Gretzky	50th Goal in 55 Games	February 4, 1987
Charlie Huddy	400th NHL Game	February 8, 1987
Glenn Anderson	500th NHL Game	February 15, 1987
Mike Krushelnyski	3rd NHL Gordie Howe hat trick	February 18, 1987
Jari Kurri	500th NHL Game	February 22, 1987
Esa Tikkanen	100th NHL PIM	February 22, 1987
Kevin McClelland	900th NHL PIM	February 24, 1987
Glenn Anderson	600th NHL Point	February 27, 1987
Reijo Ruotsalainen	100th NHL Goal	March 6, 1987
Kevin Lowe	600th NHL Game	March 7, 1987
Wayne Gretzky	1,500th NHL Point	March 11, 1987
Esa Tikkanen	100th NHL Game	March 15, 1987
Jari Kurri	50th Goal in 70 Games	March 17, 1987
Moe Lemay	400th NHL PIM	March 17, 1987
Wayne Van Dorp	1st NHL Game	March 17, 1987
Jeff Beukeboom	100th NHL PIM	March 20, 1987
Kevin Lowe	600th NHL PIM	March 20, 1987
Reijo Ruotsalainen	400th NHL Game	March 26, 1987
Glenn Anderson	300th NHL Goal	March 28, 1987
Dave Hunter	600th NHL Game	April 4, 1987
Jari Kurri	200th NHL PIM	April 4, 1987

Playoffs
Player	Milestone	Reached
Craig Muni	1st NHL Game	April 8, 1987
Mike Krushelnyski	50th NHL Game	April 9, 1987
Jari Kurri	6th NHL Hat-trick; 2nd Four-Goal NHL Game	April 9, 1987
Moe Lemay	1st NHL Goal; 1st NHL Point	April 9, 1987
Mark Messier	100th NHL Point	April 9, 1987
Glenn Anderson	100th NHL Point	April 11, 1987
Charlie Huddy	50th NHL PIM	April 12, 1987
Craig Muni	1st NHL Assist; 1st NHL Point	April 12, 1987
Steve Smith	1st NHL Goal	April 12, 1987
Glenn Anderson	150th NHL PIM	April 21, 1987
Jari Kurri	50th NHL PIM	April 25, 1987
Glenn Anderson	50th NHL Goal	April 27, 1987
Moe Lemay	1st NHL Assist	April 27, 1987
Dave Hunter	200th NHL PIM	May 5, 1987
Steve Smith	50th NHL PIM	May 7, 1987
Paul Coffey	150th NHL PIM	May 9, 1987
Craig MacTavish	50th NHL Game	May 9, 1987
Kent Nilsson	50th NHL Game	May 9, 1987
Wayne Van Dorp	1st NHL Game	May 9, 1987
Marty McSorley	100th NHL PIM	May 11, 1987
Kent Nilsson	50th NHL Point	May 13, 1987
Kelly Buchberger	1st NHL Game	May 17, 1987
Paul Coffey	100th NHL Point	May 17, 1987
Wayne Gretzky	200th NHL Point	May 20, 1987
Craig MacTavish	50th NHL PIM	May 24, 1987
Wayne Gretzky	100th NHL Game	May 28, 1987
Charlie Huddy	50th NHL Point	May 31, 1987
Mark Messier	100th NHL Game; 100th NHL PIM	May 31, 1987

== Transactions ==
=== Trades ===
June 25, 1986	To Montreal Canadiens Future considerations	To Edmonton Oilers Alfie Turcotte
July 3, 1986	To Winnipeg Jets Future considerations	To Edmonton Oilers Murray Eaves
October 2, 1986	To Buffalo Sabres Craig Muni	To Edmonton Oilers Cash
October 15, 1986	To St. Louis Todd Ewen	To Edmonton Oilers Shawn Evans
October 23, 1986	To New York Rangers Don Jackson; Stu Kulak; Miloslav Horava; Mike Golden	To Edmonton Oilers Reijo Ruotsalainen; Jim Wiemer; Ville Kentala; Clark Donatelli
December 11, 1986	To Vancouver Canucks Cash	To Edmonton Oilers Stu Kulak
December 12, 1986	To Hartford Whalers Dave Semenko	To Edmonton Oilers 3rd-round pick in 1988
March 2, 1987	To Minnesota North Stars 2nd-round pick in 1988	To Edmonton Oilers Kent Nilsson
March 6, 1987	To Buffalo Sabres Lee Fogolin; Mark Napier; 4th-round pick in 1987	To Edmonton Oilers Normand Lacombe; Wayne Van Dorp; 4th round in 1987
March 9, 1987	To Philadelphia Flyers Jeff Brubaker	To Edmonton Oilers Dom Campedelli
March 10, 1987	To Vancouver Canucks Raimo Summanen	To Edmonton Oilers Moe Lemay
May 14, 1987	To Montreal Canadiens Alfie Turcotte	To Edmonton Oilers Cash

=== Free agents ===
Player	Former team
F Tom McMurchy	Calgary Flames
D Craig Muni	Toronto Maple Leafs
D Al Tuer	Los Angeles Kings
F Danny Gare	Detroit Red Wings
G Darren Beals	Ottawa 67's (OHL)

Player	New team
F Simon Wheeldon	New York Rangers

=== Waivers ===
Date	Player	Team
October 6, 1986	Gord Sherven	to Hartford Whalers

== Draft picks ==
Edmonton's draft picks at the 1986 NHL entry draft

Round	#	Player	Nationality	College/Junior/Club team (League)
1	21	Kim Issel	Canada	Prince Albert Raiders (WHL)
2	42	Jamie Nicolls	Canada	Portland Winter Hawks (WHL)
3	63	Ron Shudra	Canada	Kamloops Blazers (WHL)
4	84	Dan Currie	Canada	Sault Ste. Marie Greyhounds (OHL)
5	105	David Haas	Canada	London Knights (OHL)
6	126	Jim Ennis	Canada	Boston University Terriers (Hockey East)
7	147	Ivan Matulik	Czechoslovakia	HC Slovan Bratislava (Czechoslovak Extraliga)
8	168	Nick Beaulieu	Canada	Drummondville Voltigeurs (QMJHL)
9	189	Mike Greenlay	Canada	Penticton Knights (BCJHL)
10	210	Matt Lanza	United States	Winthrop High School (USHS)
11	231	Mojmir Bozik	Czechoslovakia	HC Košice (Czechoslovak Extraliga)
12	252	Tony Hand	United Kingdom	Murrayfield Racers (BHL)
S2	23	Peter Heinze	United States	University of Massachusetts Lowell (Hockey East)
