= 1986–87 Winnipeg Jets season =

NHL hockey team season

1986–87 Winnipeg Jets
- Division: 3rd Smythe
- Conference: 3rd Campbell
- 1986–87 record: 40–32–8
- Home record: 25–12–3
- Road record: 15–20–5
- Goals for: 279
- Goals against: 271

Team information
- General manager: John Ferguson
- Coach: Dan Maloney
- Captain: Dale Hawerchuk
- Arena: Winnipeg Arena

Team leaders
- Goals: Dale Hawerchuk (47)
- Assists: Dale Hawerchuk (53)
- Points: Dale Hawerchuk (100)
- Penalty minutes: Jim Kyte (162)
- Wins: Pokey Reddick (21)
- Goals against average: Daniel Berthiaume (3.18)

The 1986–87 Winnipeg Jets season was the 15th season of the Winnipeg Jets, their eighth in the National Hockey League (NHL). The Jets placed third in the Smythe Division to qualify for the playoffs. The Jets defeated the Calgary Flames in the first round but lost the Division Final to the Edmonton Oilers. This was the last playoff series win for the original Jets before they moved to Phoenix, Arizona.

== Offseason ==
After a poor 1985–86 season, in which the Jets fired head coach Barry Long and replaced him on an interim basis with general manager John Ferguson, the team hired Dan Maloney to become the new head coach on June 20, 1986. Maloney had previously been the head coach of the Toronto Maple Leafs from 1984 to 1986, posting a 45–100–15 record with the Leafs during that span.

On June 21, 1986, the Jets selected forward Pat Elynuik with their first round, eighth overall draft pick at the 1986 NHL entry draft. Elynuik spent the 1985–86 season with the Prince Albert Raiders, scoring 53 goals and 106 points in 68 games. In the second round, Winnipeg selected defenseman Teppo Numminen from Tappara Tampere of the SM-liiga.

On August 15, 1986, the Jets made a trade with the Montreal Canadiens, acquiring goaltender Steve Penney and Jan Ingman for goaltender Brian Hayward. Penney had a 6–8–2 record with a 4.36 GAA with Montreal during the 1985–86 season as the back-up to Patrick Roy.

== Regular season ==
=== Final standings ===
Smythe Division
	GP	W	L	T	GF	GA	Pts
**Edmonton Oilers**	80	50	24	6	372	284	106
**Calgary Flames**	80	46	31	3	318	289	95
**Winnipeg Jets**	80	40	32	8	279	271	88
**Los Angeles Kings**	80	31	41	8	318	341	70
Vancouver Canucks	80	29	43	8	282	314	66

Note: GP = Games played, W = Wins, L = Losses, T = Ties, Pts = Points, GF = Goals for, GA = Goals against
Note: Teams that qualified for the playoffs are highlighted in bold.

=== Record vs. opponents ===
Smythe Division record vs. opponents

==== Vs. Campbell Conference ====
**Vs. Smythe Division**

1986–87 NHL records
Team	**CGY**	**EDM**	**LAK**	**VAN**	**WIN**	**Total**
Calgary	—	6–1–1	5–3	4–4	2–6	**17–14–1**
Edmonton	1–6–1	—	4–2–2	7–0–1	5–3	**17–11–4**
Los Angeles	3–5	2–4–2	—	2–5–1	3–5	**10–19–3**
Vancouver	4–4	0–7–1	5–2–1	—	3–5	**12–18–2**
Winnipeg	6–2	3–5	5–3	5–3	—	**19–13–0**

**Vs. Norris Division**

1986–87 NHL records
Team	**CHI**	**DET**	**MIN**	**STL**	**TOR**	**Total**
Calgary	3–0	1–2	1–1–1	1–2	2–1	**8–6–1**
Edmonton	1–2	3–0	2–0–1	3–0	2–1	**11–3–1**
Los Angeles	1–1–1	3–0	0–2–1	1–1–1	1–1–1	**6–5–4**
Vancouver	1–1–1	1–2	0–3	2–0–1	2–1	**6–7–2**
Winnipeg	0–3	1–1–1	2–1	1–0–2	1–2	**5–7–3**

**Vs. Wales Conference**

**Vs. Adams Division**

1986–87 NHL records
Team	**BOS**	**BUF**	**HFD**	**MTL**	**QUE**	**Total**
Calgary	1–2	3–0	2–1	1–2	2–1	**9–6–0**
Edmonton	1–2	2–1	2–1	3–0	3–0	**11–4–0**
Los Angeles	1–2	1–2	2–1	0–3	0–3	**4–11–0**
Vancouver	1–2	3–0	0–2–1	2–1	1–2	**7–7–1**
Winnipeg	1–2	2–1	1–1–1	1–2	1–0–2	**6–6–3**

**Vs. Patrick Division**

1986–87 NHL records
Team	**NJD**	**NYI**	**NYR**	**PHI**	**PIT**	**WSH**	**Total**
Calgary	2–1	2–0–1	2–1	2–1	2–1	2–1	**12–5–1**
Edmonton	2–1	2–0–1	3–0	1–2	2–1	1–2	**11–6–1**
Los Angeles	2–1	2–1	0–2–1	2–1	2–1	3–0	**11–6–1**
Vancouver	0–2–1	2–1	1–2	1–2	0–1–2	0–3	**4–11–3**
Winnipeg	3–0	1–1–1	2–1	1–2	2–1	1–1–1	**10–6–2**

== Schedule and results ==
1986–87 regular season
October

Game	Result	Date	Score	Opponent	Record
1	W	October 9, 1986	3–2	Buffalo Sabres (1986–87)	1–0–0
2	W	October 12, 1986	5–3	Edmonton Oilers (1986–87)	2–0–0
3	L	October 14, 1986	1–2	Boston Bruins (1986–87)	2–1–0
4	T	October 16, 1986	4–4 OT	@ Hartford Whalers (1986–87)	2–1–1
5	L	October 18, 1986	3–5	@ Montreal Canadiens (1986–87)	2–2–1
6	L	October 19, 1986	1–3	@ Philadelphia Flyers (1986–87)	2–3–1
7	W	October 24, 1986	5–2	Calgary Flames (1986–87)	3–3–1
8	L	October 26, 1986	4–8	Chicago Blackhawks (1986–87)	3–4–1
9	W	October 29, 1986	6–2	Calgary Flames (1986–87)	4–4–1

November

Game	Result	Date	Score	Opponent	Record
10	L	November 1, 1986	4–7	@ New York Islanders (1986–87)	4–5–1
11	W	November 2, 1986	5–4 OT	@ New York Rangers (1986–87)	5–5–1
12	W	November 4, 1986	6–3	@ Quebec Nordiques (1986–87)	6–5–1
13	W	November 7, 1986	2–0	St. Louis Blues (1986–87)	7–5–1
14	W	November 9, 1986	8–1	New Jersey Devils (1986–87)	8–5–1
15	L	November 11, 1986	3–4	@ Los Angeles Kings (1986–87)	8–6–1
16	W	November 13, 1986	6–5	@ Los Angeles Kings (1986–87)	9–6–1
17	W	November 14, 1986	3–2	@ Vancouver Canucks (1986–87)	10–6–1
18	W	November 16, 1986	3–1	New York Islanders (1986–87)	11–6–1
19	W	November 18, 1986	3–1	Pittsburgh Penguins (1986–87)	12–6–1
20	L	November 21, 1986	1–4	Los Angeles Kings (1986–87)	12–7–1
21	W	November 23, 1986	3–2	Los Angeles Kings (1986–87)	13–7–1
22	L	November 26, 1986	3–4	@ Edmonton Oilers (1986–87)	13–8–1
23	W	November 27, 1986	4–3	@ Calgary Flames (1986–87)	14–8–1
24	W	November 29, 1986	6–3	@ Vancouver Canucks (1986–87)	15–8–1

December

Game	Result	Date	Score	Opponent	Record
25	T	December 3, 1986	3–3 OT	Washington Capitals (1986–87)	15–8–2
26	L	December 5, 1986	3–6	New York Rangers (1986–87)	15–9–2
27	L	December 7, 1986	1–3	Vancouver Canucks (1986–87)	15–10–2
28	L	December 10, 1986	4–7	Edmonton Oilers (1986–87)	15–11–2
29	L	December 12, 1986	1–6	@ Edmonton Oilers (1986–87)	15–12–2
30	L	December 14, 1986	1–4	Philadelphia Flyers (1986–87)	15–13–2
31	L	December 17, 1986	1–5	@ Chicago Blackhawks (1986–87)	15–14–2
32	T	December 18, 1986	3–3 OT	@ St. Louis Blues (1986–87)	15–14–3
33	T	December 21, 1986	4–4 OT	Quebec Nordiques (1986–87)	15–14–4
34	W	December 23, 1986	2–1	@ Edmonton Oilers (1986–87)	16–14–4
35	L	December 26, 1986	2–4	@ Minnesota North Stars (1986–87)	16–15–4
36	W	December 28, 1986	5–4	Minnesota North Stars (1986–87)	17–15–4
37	L	December 31, 1986	1–6	@ Toronto Maple Leafs (1986–87)	17–16–4

January

Game	Result	Date	Score	Opponent	Record
38	W	January 2, 1987	6–3	@ Buffalo Sabres (1986–87)	18–16–4
39	W	January 4, 1987	4–2	Vancouver Canucks (1986–87)	19–16–4
40	L	January 7, 1987	2–4	Buffalo Sabres (1986–87)	19–17–4
41	W	January 9, 1987	3–0	Hartford Whalers (1986–87)	20–17–4
42	W	January 10, 1987	5–2	@ Detroit Red Wings (1986–87)	21–17–4
43	W	January 13, 1987	3–2	@ Washington Capitals (1986–87)	22–17–4
44	W	January 14, 1987	4–3	@ Pittsburgh Penguins (1986–87)	23–17–4
45	W	January 16, 1987	5–4	@ New Jersey Devils (1986–87)	24–17–4
46	W	January 18, 1987	5–3	Minnesota North Stars (1986–87)	25–17–4
47	W	January 19, 1987	5–4	Vancouver Canucks (1986–87)	26–17–4
48	L	January 21, 1987	3–5	Edmonton Oilers (1986–87)	26–18–4
49	W	January 23, 1987	7–5	Toronto Maple Leafs (1986–87)	27–18–4
50	T	January 27, 1987	2–2 OT	@ New York Islanders (1986–87)	27–18–5
51	W	January 28, 1987	2–1	@ New York Rangers (1986–87)	28–18–5
52	L	January 31, 1987	3–6	@ Boston Bruins (1986–87)	28–19–5

February

Game	Result	Date	Score	Opponent	Record
53	L	February 1, 1987	4–6	@ Washington Capitals (1986–87)	28–20–5
54	W	February 4, 1987	5–3	Philadelphia Flyers (1986–87)	29–20–5
55	W	February 6, 1987	6–1	Los Angeles Kings (1986–87)	30–20–5
56	W	February 8, 1987	3–1	Los Angeles Kings (1986–87)	31–20–5
57	L	February 14, 1987	2–5	@ Montreal Canadiens (1986–87)	31–21–5
58	T	February 17, 1987	3–3 OT	@ Quebec Nordiques (1986–87)	31–21–6
59	L	February 18, 1987	2–5	@ Detroit Red Wings (1986–87)	31–22–6
60	W	February 20, 1987	6–2	Boston Bruins (1986–87)	32–22–6
61	W	February 22, 1987	5–2	Edmonton Oilers (1986–87)	33–22–6
62	L	February 24, 1987	3–8	@ Los Angeles Kings (1986–87)	33–23–6
63	W	February 26, 1987	4–3	@ Los Angeles Kings (1986–87)	34–23–6
64	L	February 28, 1987	3–5	@ Calgary Flames (1986–87)	34–24–6

March

Game	Result	Date	Score	Opponent	Record
65	W	March 1, 1987	6–3	Calgary Flames (1986–87)	35–24–6
66	L	March 4, 1987	2–3	@ Chicago Blackhawks (1986–87)	35–25–6
67	T	March 5, 1987	1–1 OT	@ St. Louis Blues (1986–87)	35–25–7
68	L	March 8, 1987	3–5	Pittsburgh Penguins (1986–87)	35–26–7
69	W	March 11, 1987	2–1	Montreal Canadiens (1986–87)	36–26–7
70	L	March 13, 1987	0–3	Hartford Whalers (1986–87)	36–27–7
71	T	March 15, 1987	1–1 OT	Detroit Red Wings (1986–87)	36–27–8
72	W	March 18, 1987	4–3 OT	New Jersey Devils (1986–87)	37–27–8
73	L	March 20, 1987	5–6 OT	@ Vancouver Canucks (1986–87)	37–28–8
74	W	March 22, 1987	3–2	Vancouver Canucks (1986–87)	38–28–8
75	W	March 25, 1987	10–1	Calgary Flames (1986–87)	39–28–8
76	L	March 26, 1987	1–3	@ Calgary Flames (1986–87)	39–29–8
77	L	March 29, 1987	2–6	Toronto Maple Leafs (1986–87)	39–30–8
78	L	March 31, 1987	4–5 OT	@ Edmonton Oilers (1986–87)	39–31–8

April

Game	Result	Date	Score	Opponent	Record
79	L	April 3, 1987	4–6	@ Vancouver Canucks (1986–87)	39–32–8
80	W	April 5, 1987	3–1	@ Calgary Flames (1986–87)	40–32–8

Legend: Win (2 points) Loss (0 points) Tie (1 point)

== Playoffs ==
The Jets won the Division semi-finals (4–2) versus Calgary Flames to advance to the Division Finals, which they lost 4–0 to the eventual Stanley Cup champion Edmonton Oilers.

== Player statistics ==
=== Regular season ===
Scoring

Player	Pos	GP	G	A	Pts	PIM	+/-	PPG	SHG	GWG
Dale Hawerchuk	C	80	47	53	100	52	3	10	0	4
Paul MacLean	RW	72	32	42	74	75	12	10	0	6
Brian Mullen	RW	69	19	32	51	20	-2	7	0	4
Thomas Steen	C	75	17	33	50	59	7	3	3	1
Gilles Hamel	LW	79	27	21	48	24	3	1	1	4
Dave Ellett	D	78	13	31	44	53	19	5	0	2
Mario Marois	D	79	4	40	44	106	-1	1	0	0
Doug Smail	LW	78	25	18	43	36	18	0	2	4
Randy Carlyle	D	71	16	26	42	93	-6	5	0	4
Laurie Boschman	C	80	17	24	41	152	-17	1	1	2
Ray Neufeld	RW	80	18	18	36	105	-13	5	0	2
Fredrik Olausson	D	72	7	29	36	24	-3	1	0	2
Andrew McBain	RW	71	11	21	32	106	6	1	1	0
Tim Watters	D	63	3	13	16	119	5	0	0	0
Ron Wilson	C	80	3	13	16	13	10	0	0	0
Jim Kyte	D	72	5	5	10	162	4	0	0	1
Brad Berry	D	52	2	8	10	60	6	0	0	0
Bill Derlago	C	30	3	6	9	12	-3	1	0	1
Hannu Jarvenpaa	RW	20	1	8	9	8	-4	0	0	0
Jim Nill	RW	36	3	4	7	52	1	1	0	2
Perry Turnbull	C	26	1	5	6	44	-2	0	0	0
Steve Rooney	LW	30	2	3	5	57	-4	0	0	1
Iain Duncan	LW	6	1	2	3	0	1	0	0	0
Brad Jones	LW	4	1	0	1	0	2	0	0	0
Tom Martin	LW	11	1	0	1	49	1	0	0	0
Joel Baillargeon	LW	11	0	1	1	15	-3	0	0	0
Craig Endean	LW	2	0	1	1	0	1	0	0	0
Daniel Berthiaume	G	31	0	0	0	2	0	0	0	0
Peter Douris	RW	6	0	0	0	0	-1	0	0	0
Randy Gilhen	C	2	0	0	0	0	-2	0	0	0
Steve Penney	G	7	0	0	0	7	0	0	0	0
Pokey Reddick	G	48	0	0	0	8	0	0	0	0
Peter Taglianetti	D	3	0	0	0	12	-4	0	0	0

Goaltending

Player	MIN	GP	W	L	T	GA	GAA	SO	SA	SV	SV%
Pokey Reddick	2762	48	21	21	4	149	3.24	0	1256	1107	.881
Daniel Berthiaume	1758	31	18	7	3	93	3.17	1	810	717	.885
Steve Penney	327	7	1	4	1	25	4.59	0	134	109	.813
Team:	4847	80	40	32	8	267	3.31	1	2200	1933	.879

=== Playoffs ===
Scoring

Player	Pos	GP	G	A	Pts	PIM	PPG	SHG	GWG
Dale Hawerchuk	C	10	5	8	13	4	3	0	0
Dave Ellett	D	10	0	8	8	2	0	0	0
Paul MacLean	RW	10	5	2	7	16	2	0	0
Thomas Steen	C	10	3	4	7	8	0	1	1
Brian Mullen	RW	9	4	2	6	0	2	0	0
Randy Carlyle	D	10	1	5	6	18	0	0	0
Laurie Boschman	C	10	2	3	5	32	1	0	0
Fredrik Olausson	D	10	2	3	5	4	1	0	0
Doug Smail	LW	10	4	0	4	10	0	1	0
Mario Marois	D	10	1	3	4	23	0	0	1
Jim Kyte	D	10	0	4	4	36	0	0	0
Ron Wilson	C	10	1	2	3	0	0	0	0
Gilles Hamel	LW	8	2	0	2	2	0	0	2
Ray Neufeld	RW	8	1	1	2	30	0	0	0
Iain Duncan	LW	7	0	2	2	6	0	0	0
Andrew McBain	RW	9	0	2	2	10	0	0	0
Brad Berry	D	7	0	1	1	14	0	0	0
Daniel Berthiaume	G	8	0	0	0	0	0	0	0
Jim Nill	RW	3	0	0	0	7	0	0	0
Pokey Reddick	G	3	0	0	0	0	0	0	0
Steve Rooney	LW	8	0	0	0	34	0	0	0
Perry Turnbull	C	1	0	0	0	10	0	0	0
Tim Watters	D	10	0	0	0	21	0	0	0

Goaltending

Player	MIN	GP	W	L	GA	GAA	SO	SA	SV	SV%
Daniel Berthiaume	439	8	4	4	21	2.87	0	210	189	.900
Pokey Reddick	166	3	0	2	10	3.61	0	74	64	.865
Team:	605	10	4	6	31	3.07	0	284	253	.891

Note:

Pos = Position;GP = Games played; G = Goals; A = Assists; Pts = Points; PIM = Penalty minutes; +/- = Plus/minus; PPG = Power-play goals; SHG = Short-handed goals; GWG = Game-winning goals
Pos = Position;GP = Games played; Min, TOI = Minutes played; W = Wins; L = Losses; T,T/OT = Ties; OTL = Overtime losses; GA = Goals-against; GAA = Goals-against average; SO = Shutouts; SA = Shots against; SV = Shots saved;SV% = Save percentage;

== Transactions ==
=== Trades ===
June 21, 1986	To Buffalo Sabres Scott Arniel	To Winnipeg Jets Gilles Hamel
July 3, 1986	To Edmonton Oilers Murray Eaves	To Winnipeg Jets Future Considerations
August 15, 1986	To Montreal Canadiens Brian Hayward	To Winnipeg Jets Steve Penney; Jan Ingman
January 5, 1987	To Quebec Nordiques Bill Derlago	To Winnipeg Jets 4th round pick in 1989 – Mark Brownschidle
January 8, 1987	To Montreal Canadiens 3rd round pick in 1987 – François Gravel	To Winnipeg Jets Steve Rooney
June 5, 1987	To St. Louis Blues Perry Turnbull	To Winnipeg Jets 5th round pick in 1987 – Ken Gernander
June 8, 1987	To New York Rangers Brian Mullen; 10th round pick in 1987 – Brett Barnett	To Winnipeg Jets 5th round pick in 1988 – Ben Lebeau; 3rd round pick in 1989 – Denny Felsner

== Draft picks ==
The Jets selected the following players at the 1986 NHL entry draft, which was held at the Toronto Convention Centre in Toronto on June 15, 1985.

=== NHL entry draft ===
Round	Pick	Player	Nationality	College/Junior/Club team
1	8	Pat Elynuik (RW)	Canada	Prince Albert Raiders (WHL)
2	29	Teppo Numminen (D)	Finland	Tappara Tampere (SM-liiga)
3	50	Esa Palosaari (G)	Finland	Oulun Kärpät (FinD1)
4	71	Hannu Jarvenpaa (RW)	Finland	Oulun Kärpät (FinD1)
5	92	Craig Endean (LW)	Canada	Seattle Breakers (WHL)
6	113	Rob Bateman (D)	Canada	St. Laurent High School (Que.)
8	155	Frank Furlan (G)	Canada	Sherwood Park Crusaders (AJHL)
9	176	Mark Green (LW)	United States	New Hampton Prep (NH)
10	97	John Blue (G)	United States	University of Minnesota (NCAA)
11	218	Matt Cote (D)	United States	Lake Superior State University (NCAA)
12	239	Arto Blomsten (D)	Sweden	Djurgårdens IF (SEL)
S2	11	Chris Levasseur	United States	University of Alaska Anchorage (WCHA)

== See also ==
- 1986–87 NHL season
