= Craig Muni =

Canadian ice hockey player

- Born: July 19, 1962 (age 64) Toronto, Ontario, Canada
- Height: 6 ft 2 in (188 cm)
- Weight: 200 lb (91 kg; 14 st 4 lb)
- Position: Defence
- Shot: Left
- Played for: Toronto Maple Leafs; Edmonton Oilers; Chicago Blackhawks; Buffalo Sabres; Winnipeg Jets; Pittsburgh Penguins; Dallas Stars
- NHL draft: 25th overall, 1980; Toronto Maple Leafs
- Playing career: 1982–1998

Craig Douglas James Muni (born July 19, 1962) is a Canadian former professional ice hockey player who played 819 National Hockey League (NHL) games throughout his career.

== Playing career ==
As a youth, Muni played in the 1975 Quebec International Pee-Wee Hockey Tournament with a minor ice hockey team from Toronto.

Known as a defensive specialist, open ice hitter, penalty killer and a shot blocker, Muni won three Stanley Cups with the Edmonton Oilers in 1987, 1988, and 1990 and also played for the Chicago Blackhawks, Buffalo Sabres, Pittsburgh Penguins, Toronto Maple Leafs, Dallas Stars and Winnipeg Jets. He holds the record for most playoff games without scoring a goal (113) in Stanley Cup playoffs history. He retired in 1998.

== Coaching career ==
On June 25, 2016, he was named the co-head coach of the NWHL's Buffalo Beauts, sharing duties with former NHL player Ric Seiling.

== Career statistics ==
| | | | Regular season | | | | | Playoffs |
| Season | Team | League | GP | G | A | Pts | PIM | GP | G | A | Pts | PIM |
|---|---|---|---|---|---|---|---|---|---|---|---|---|
| 1978–79 | Mississauga Reps Midget AAA | GTHL | 38 | 8 | 16 | 24 | — | — | — | — | — | — |
| 1978–79 | St. Michael's Buzzers | MetJHL | 2 | 2 | 3 | 5 | 23 | — | — | — | — | — |
| 1978–79 | Dixie Beehives | OPJHL | 2 | 0 | 0 | 0 | 0 | — | — | — | — | — |
| 1979–80 | Kingston Canadians | OMJHL | 66 | 6 | 28 | 34 | 114 | 3 | 0 | 1 | 1 | 9 |
| 1980–81 | Kingston Canadians | OHL | 38 | 2 | 14 | 16 | 65 | — | — | — | — | — |
| 1980–81 | Windsor Spitfires | OHL | 25 | 5 | 11 | 16 | 41 | 11 | 1 | 4 | 5 | 14 |
| 1980–81 | New Brunswick Hawks | AHL | — | — | — | — | — | 2 | 0 | 1 | 1 | 10 |
| 1981–82 | Toronto Maple Leafs | NHL | 3 | 0 | 0 | 0 | 2 | — | — | — | — | — |
| 1981–82 | Windsor Spitfires | OHL | 49 | 5 | 32 | 37 | 92 | 9 | 2 | 3 | 5 | 16 |
| 1981–82 | Cincinnati Tigers | CHL | — | — | — | — | — | 3 | 0 | 2 | 2 | 2 |
| 1982–83 | St. Catharines Saints | AHL | 64 | 6 | 32 | 38 | 52 | — | — | — | — | — |
| 1982–83 | Toronto Maple Leafs | NHL | 2 | 0 | 1 | 1 | 0 | — | — | — | — | — |
| 1983–84 | St. Catharines Saints | AHL | 64 | 4 | 16 | 20 | 79 | 7 | 0 | 1 | 1 | 0 |
| 1984–85 | St. Catharines Saints | AHL | 68 | 7 | 17 | 24 | 54 | — | — | — | — | — |
| 1984–85 | Toronto Maple Leafs | NHL | 8 | 0 | 0 | 0 | 0 | — | — | — | — | — |
| 1985–86 | St. Catharines Saints | AHL | 73 | 3 | 34 | 37 | 91 | 13 | 0 | 5 | 5 | 16 |
| 1985–86 | Toronto Maple Leafs | NHL | 6 | 0 | 1 | 1 | 4 | — | — | — | — | — |
| 1986–87 | Edmonton Oilers | NHL | 79 | 7 | 22 | 29 | 85 | 14 | 0 | 2 | 2 | 17 |
| 1987–88 | Edmonton Oilers | NHL | 72 | 4 | 15 | 19 | 77 | 19 | 0 | 4 | 4 | 31 |
| 1988–89 | Edmonton Oilers | NHL | 69 | 5 | 13 | 18 | 71 | 7 | 0 | 3 | 3 | 8 |
| 1989–90 | Edmonton Oilers | NHL | 71 | 5 | 12 | 17 | 81 | 22 | 0 | 3 | 3 | 16 |
| 1990–91 | Edmonton Oilers | NHL | 76 | 1 | 9 | 10 | 77 | 18 | 0 | 3 | 3 | 20 |
| 1991–92 | Edmonton Oilers | NHL | 54 | 2 | 5 | 7 | 34 | 3 | 0 | 0 | 0 | 2 |
| 1992–93 | Edmonton Oilers | NHL | 72 | 0 | 11 | 11 | 67 | — | — | — | — | — |
| 1992–93 | Chicago Blackhawks | NHL | 9 | 0 | 0 | 0 | 8 | 4 | 0 | 0 | 0 | 2 |
| 1993–94 | Chicago Blackhawks | NHL | 9 | 0 | 4 | 4 | 4 | — | — | — | — | — |
| 1993–94 | Buffalo Sabres | NHL | 73 | 2 | 8 | 10 | 62 | 7 | 0 | 0 | 0 | 4 |
| 1994–95 | Buffalo Sabres | NHL | 40 | 0 | 6 | 6 | 36 | 5 | 0 | 1 | 1 | 2 |
| 1995–96 | Buffalo Sabres | NHL | 47 | 0 | 4 | 4 | 69 | — | — | — | — | — |
| 1995–96 | Winnipeg Jets | NHL | 25 | 1 | 3 | 4 | 37 | 6 | 0 | 1 | 1 | 2 |
| 1996–97 | Pittsburgh Penguins | NHL | 64 | 0 | 4 | 4 | 36 | 3 | 0 | 0 | 0 | 0 |
| 1997–98 | Dallas Stars | NHL | 40 | 1 | 1 | 2 | 25 | 5 | 0 | 0 | 0 | 4 |
| AHL totals | | | 269 | 20 | 89 | 119 | 276 | 22 | 0 | 7 | 7 | 26 |
| NHL totals | | | 819 | 28 | 119 | 147 | 775 | 113 | 0 | 17 | 17 | 108 |

== Awards and achievements ==
- 1986–87 - NHL - Stanley Cup (Edmonton)
- 1987–88 - NHL - Stanley Cup (Edmonton)
- 1989-90 - NHL - Stanley Cup (Edmonton)
- 2016-17 - NWHL - Isobel Cup (Buffalo)
