= Pokey Reddick =

Canadian ice hockey player (born 1964)

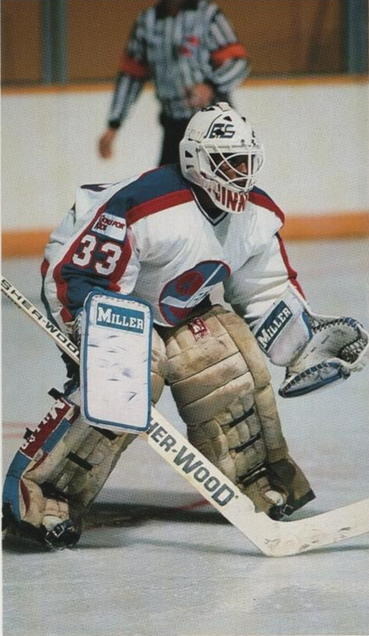
- Born: October 6, 1964 (age 61) Halifax, Nova Scotia, Canada
- Height: 5 ft 8 in (173 cm)
- Weight: 170 lb (77 kg; 12 st 2 lb)
- Position: Goaltender
- Caught: Left
- Played for: Winnipeg Jets; Edmonton Oilers; Florida Panthers; Cincinnati Cyclones; Frankfurt Lions
- NHL draft: Undrafted
- Playing career: 1984–2003

Eldon Wade "Pokey" Reddick (born October 6, 1964) is a Canadian former professional ice hockey goaltender in the National Hockey League from 1986–87 to 1993–94.

== Playing career ==
As a youth, Reddick played in the 1977 Quebec International Pee-Wee Hockey Tournament with a minor ice hockey team from Toronto.

Reddick spent most of his career in various minor leagues playing for various teams. His NHL-level experience included playing for the Winnipeg Jets, Edmonton Oilers, and Florida Panthers. He won a Stanley Cup Championship with the Oilers in 1990 as the backup goaltender to Bill Ranford, because of a season-ending injury to the Oilers regular goaltender Grant Fuhr. During his tenure with the Winnipeg Jets, he formed one half of the goaltending duo "Pokey and the Bandit" with Daniel Berthiaume.

Pokey Reddick holds the National Hockey League record for most games played by a goaltender without recording a shutout. Reddick played in 132 National Hockey League games over his career without recording a single shutout.

Reddick also holds the distinction of being the only goaltender at any level of professional hockey to go through a three-round playoff system undefeated. He achieved this feat with the Fort Wayne Komets in the IHL in 1992–93. Reddick had a 1.49 GAA through 12 postseason games, leading the Komets to the franchise's first title in 20 years.

== Personal ==
Reddick received the nickname "Pokey" from his father as a result of his "slowpoke" movement throughout the house.

His younger brother, Stan "Smokey" Reddick, was also a goaltender who spent twelve years playing in the ECHL and Slovenia. His son, Bryce Reddick, is a defenseman active in the minor leagues and European hockey as of 2020.

Reddick was formerly an assistant coach for the Tri-City Storm of the USHL. He currently resides in Las Vegas, Nevada, and served as tournament director at the Las Vegas Ice Center through April 2014 and head coach of the Las Vegas Storm Midget U16 AAA hockey team through April 2013. He is also coaching the first high school hockey team in Nevada at Faith Lutheran Middle School & High School, which is playing in its inaugural season in 2018-2019.

== Career statistics ==
=== Regular season and playoffs ===
			Regular season									Playoffs
Season	Team	League	GP	W	L	T	MIN	GA	SO	GAA	SV%	GP	W	L	MIN	GA	SO	GAA	SV%
1981–82	Billings Bighorns	WHL	1	0	1	0	60	7	0	7.00	.881	—	—	—	—	—	—	—	—
1982–83	Nanaimo Islanders	WHL	66	19	38	1	3549	383	0	6.46	.847	—	—	—	—	—	—	—	—
1983–84	New Westminster Bruins	WHL	50	24	22	2	2930	215	0	4.40	.884	9	4	5	542	53	0	5.87	—
1984–85	Brandon Wheat Kings	WHL	47	14	30	1	2585	243	0	5.64	.873	—	—	—	—	—	—	—	—
1984–85	Sherbrooke Canadiens	AHL	2	0	1	0	74	7	0	5.68	.781	—	—	—	—	—	—	—	—
1985–86	Fort Wayne Komets	IHL	29	15	11	0	1674	86	3	3.00	—	—	—	—	—	—	—	—	—
1986–87	Winnipeg Jets	NHL	48	21	21	4	2760	149	0	3.24	.881	3	0	2	165	10	0	3.63	.863
1987–88	Winnipeg Jets	NHL	28	9	13	3	1488	102	0	4.11	.857	—	—	—	—	—	—	—	—
1987–88	Moncton Hawks	AHL	9	2	6	1	545	26	0	2.86	.911	—	—	—	—	—	—	—	—
1988–89	Winnipeg Jets	NHL	41	11	17	7	2109	144	0	4.10	.872	—	—	—	—	—	—	—	—
1989–90	Edmonton Oilers	NHL	11	5	4	2	604	31	0	3.08	.890	1	0	0	2	0	0	0.00	1.000
1989–90	Cape Breton Oilers	AHL	15	9	4	1	821	54	0	3.95	.874	—	—	—	—	—	—	—	—
1989–90	Phoenix Roadrunners	IHL	3	2	1	0	185	7	0	2.27	.926	—	—	—	—	—	—	—	—
1990–91	Edmonton Oilers	NHL	2	0	2	0	120	9	0	4.50	.847	—	—	—	—	—	—	—	—
1990–91	Cape Breton Oilers	AHL	31	19	10	0	1673	97	2	3.48	.899	2	0	2	124	10	0	4.84	—
1991–92	Cape Breton Oilers	AHL	16	5	3	3	765	45	0	3.53	.896	—	—	—	—	—	—	—	—
1991–92	Fort Wayne Komets	IHL	14	6	5	2	787	40	1	3.05	—	7	3	4	369	18	0	2.93	—
1992–93	Fort Wayne Komets	IHL	54	33	16	4	3043	156	3	3.08	.898	12	12	0	723	18	0	1.49	.947
1993–94	Florida Panthers	NHL	2	0	1	0	80	8	0	6.00	.822	—	—	—	—	—	—	—	—
1993–94	Cincinnati Cyclones	IHL	54	31	12	6	2894	147	2	3.05	.810	10	6	2	498	21	1	2.53	.922
1994–95	Las Vegas Thunder	IHL	40	23	13	1	2075	104	3	3.01	.896	10	4	6	592	31	0	3.14	.905
1995–96	Las Vegas Thunder	IHL	47	27	12	4	2636	129	1	2.94	.901	15	8	6	770	43	0	3.35	.885
1996–97	Grand Rapids Griffins	IHL	61	30	14	10	3244	134	6	2.48	.915	5	2	3	335	13	0	2.32	.916
1997–98	Grand Rapids Griffins	IHL	10	5	5	0	575	33	0	3.44	.893	—	—	—	—	—	—	—	—
1997–98	San Antonio Dragons	IHL	16	5	9	1	861	45	1	3.13	.900	—	—	—	—	—	—	—	—
1997–98	Kansas City Blades	IHL	22	10	7	3	1255	55	1	2.63	.915	4	2	1	203	14	0	4.14	.865
1998–99	Fort Wayne Komets	IHL	33	12	15	5	1874	102	1	3.27	.905	1	0	1	60	4	0	4.00	.892
1999–00	Frankfurt Lions	DEL	52	—	—	—	2943	144	1	2.94	.905	5	—	—	317	16	0	3.03	.886
2000–01	Frankfurt Lions	DEL	47	—	—	—	2642	118	2	2.68	.914	—	—	—	—	—	—	—	—
2001–02	Frankfurt Lions	DEL	52	—	—	—	2948	147	4	2.99	.906	—	—	—	—	—	—	—	—
2002–03	Fort Wayne Komets	UHL	9	3	2	1	402	21	0	3.14	.848	—	—	—	—	—	—	—	—
NHL totals			132	46	58	16	7161	443	0	3.71	.873	4	0	2	167	10	0	3.59	.865

== Awards and honours ==
Award	Year
WHL
West First All-Star Team	1984
IHL
James Norris Memorial Trophy	1986
N.R. "Bud" Poile Trophy	1993
Turner Cup (Fort Wayne Komets)	1993
NHL
Stanley Cup (Edmonton Oilers)	1990
UHL
Colonial Cup (Fort Wayne Komets)	2003
