= 1987 Stanley Cup playoffs =

Ice hockey playoffs

Tournament details
- Dates: April 8–May 31, 1987
- Teams: 16
- Defending champions: Montreal Canadiens

Final positions
- Champions: Edmonton Oilers
- Runners-up: Philadelphia Flyers

Tournament statistics
- Scoring leader(s): Wayne Gretzky (Oilers) (34 points)

Awards
- MVP: Ron Hextall (Flyers)

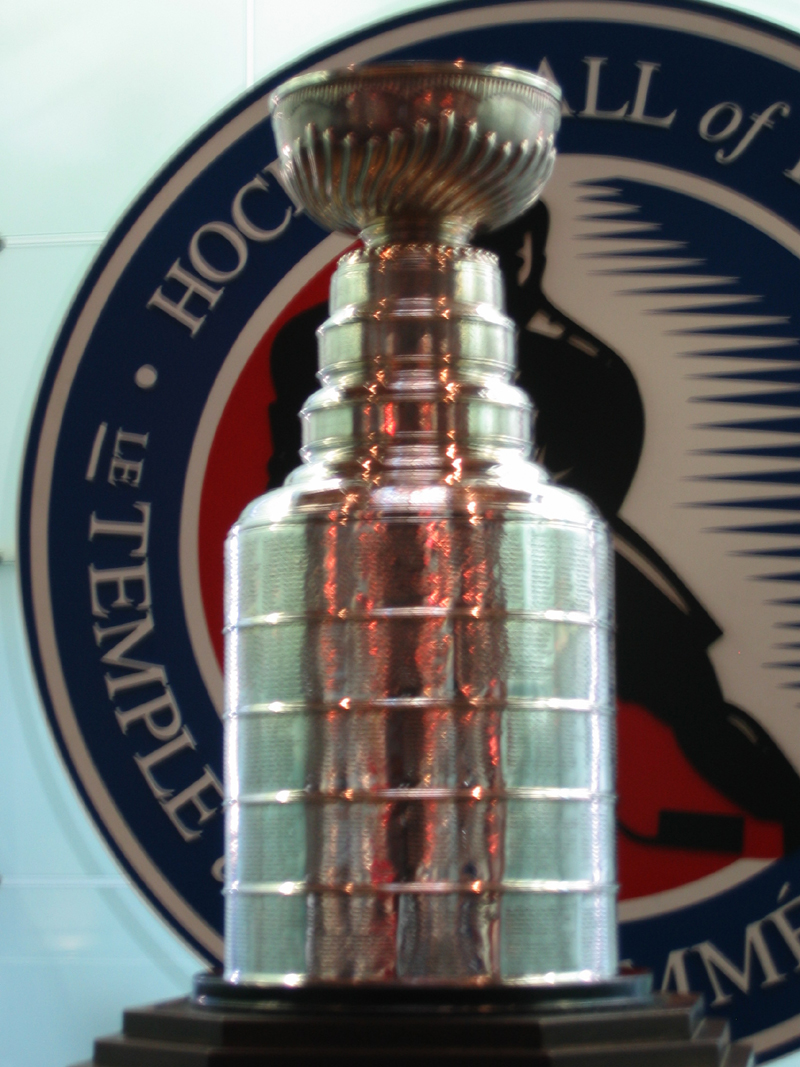
The Stanley Cup

The 1987 Stanley Cup playoffs, the playoff tournament of the National Hockey League (NHL) began on April 8, after the conclusion of the 1986–87 NHL season. It concluded on May 31, with the Edmonton Oilers defeating the Philadelphia Flyers to win the Stanley Cup. In an attempt to reduce the number of first round upsets, the NHL expanded the Division Semifinals series from a best-of-five series to a best-of-seven series.

The 1987 playoffs marked the second consecutive year that all four former WHA teams made the playoffs in the same year. It would not happen again until 2020 by which time two of those teams had moved, the Quebec Nordiques to Denver, and the Hartford Whalers to Raleigh. (Note: As of 2026, the Winnipeg Jets' franchise records from 1972 to 1996 were consolidated with the modern Jets/Thrashers franchise while the Arizona Coyotes were retconned as a 1996 expansion team. The Jets were considered deactivated from 1996 to 1999 while its hockey assets relocated to Phoenix, Arizona as the Coyotes. The modern Jets were initially established as the Atlanta Thrashers in 1999 before relocating to Winnipeg in 2011) For the second time ever, the first time being 1978, all of the Original Six teams made the playoffs in the same season.

At the time the Philadelphia Flyers set an NHL playoff record by playing in 26 games during the playoffs. This record was equaled by four other teams (2004 Calgary Flames, 2014 Los Angeles Kings, 2015 Tampa Bay Lightning, and 2019 St. Louis Blues), this remained the most under the four-round, 16 team playoff format before the 2020 Dallas Stars broke the record during the 2020 Stanley Cup playoffs under the expanded format.

== Playoff seeds ==
The top four teams in each division qualified for the playoffs, as follows:

=== Prince of Wales Conference ===
==== Adams Division ====
1. Hartford Whalers, Adams Division champions – 93 points
2. Montreal Canadiens – 92 points
3. Boston Bruins – 85 points
4. Quebec Nordiques – 72 points

==== Patrick Division ====
1. Philadelphia Flyers, Patrick Division champions, Prince of Wales Conference regular season champions – 100 points
2. Washington Capitals – 86 points
3. New York Islanders – 82 points
4. New York Rangers – 76 points

=== Clarence Campbell Conference ===
==== Norris Division ====
1. St. Louis Blues, Norris Division champions – 79 points
2. Detroit Red Wings – 78 points
3. Chicago Blackhawks – 72 points
4. Toronto Maple Leafs – 70 points

==== Smythe Division ====
1. Edmonton Oilers, Smythe Division champions, Clarence Campbell Conference regular season champions, Presidents' Trophy winners – 106 points
2. Calgary Flames – 95 points
3. Winnipeg Jets – 88 points
4. Los Angeles Kings – 70 points

== Playoff bracket ==
In the division semifinals, the fourth seeded team in each division played against the division winner from their division. The other series matched the second and third place teams from the divisions. The two winning teams from each division's semifinals then met in the division finals. The two division winners of each conference then played in the conference finals. The two conference winners then advanced to the Stanley Cup Finals.

This was the first year that all rounds were competed in a best-of-seven series, after the division semifinals were expanded from a best-of-five format. Each series following a 2–2–1–1–1 format (scores in the bracket indicate the number of games won in each best-of-seven series). Home ice advantage was awarded to the team that had the better regular season record, and played at home for games one and two (and games five and seven, if necessary); the other team then played at home for games three and four (and game six, if necessary).

Division semifinals	Division finals
A1	Hartford	2
A4	Quebec	4
A4	Quebec	3
A2	Montreal	4
A2	Montreal	4
A3	Boston	0
Prince of Wales Conference
P1	Philadelphia	4
P4	NY Rangers	2
P1	Philadelphia	4
P3	NY Islanders	3
P2	Washington	3
P3	NY Islanders	4
N1	St. Louis	2
N4	Toronto	4
N4	Toronto	3
N2	Detroit	4
N2	Detroit	4
N3	Chicago	0
Clarence Campbell Conference
S1	Edmonton	4
S4	Los Angeles	1
S1	Edmonton	4
S3	Winnipeg	0
S2	Calgary	2
S3	Winnipeg	4

Conference finals
A2	Montreal	2
P1	Philadelphia	4
N2	Detroit	1
S1	Edmonton	4

Stanley Cup Finals
P1	Philadelphia	3
S1	Edmonton	4

== Division semifinals ==
=== Prince of Wales Conference ===
==== (A1) Hartford Whalers vs. (A4) Quebec Nordiques ====
This was the second playoff series meeting between these two teams. Harford won the only previous meeting in a three-game sweep in the last year's Adams Division Semifinals.

This was the last series that the Nordiques/Avalanche franchise won in Quebec City, the franchise did not win another playoff series until 1996 when they were the Colorado Avalanche.

April 8	Quebec Nordiques	2–3	OT	Hartford Whalers	Hartford Civic Center	Recap
Peter Stastny (1) – 01:59		First period		No scoring
Robert Picard (1) – 06:32		Second period		09:16 – pp – John Anderson (1)
No scoring		Third period		08:48 – Dean Evason (1)
No scoring		First overtime period		02:20 – Paul MacDermid (1)
Mario Gosselin 38 saves / 41 shots		Goalie stats		Mike Liut 23 saves / 25 shots

April 9	Quebec Nordiques	4–5	Hartford Whalers	Hartford Civic Center	Recap
Randy Moller (1) – 03:35; Jeff Brown (1) – pp – 15:31		First period	09:41 – Sylvain Turgeon (1)
No scoring		Second period	10:26 – Stew Gavin (1); 11:55 – Scot Kleinendorst (1); 17:04 – Paul MacDermid (2)
John Ogrodnick (1) – 08:22; Lane Lambert (1) – 16:22		Third period	06:58 – pp – Dana Murzyn (1)
Clint Malarchuk 24 saves / 29 shots		Goalie stats	Mike Liut 20 saves / 24 shots

April 11	Hartford Whalers	1–5	Quebec Nordiques	Colisée de Québec	Recap
No scoring		First period	01:20 – sh – Peter Stastny (2); 07:56 – Peter Stastny (3); 15:02 – pp – Michel Goulet (1)
No scoring		Second period	03:34 – Michel Goulet (2); 06:33 – pp – Peter Stastny (4)
Ron Francis (1) – pp – 03:03		Third period	No scoring
Mike Liut 11 saves / 15 shots Steve Weeks 21 saves / 22 shots		Goalie stats	Mario Gosselin 29 saves / 30 shots

April 12	Hartford Whalers	1–4	Quebec Nordiques	Colisée de Québec	Recap
Dana Murzyn (2) – 10:25		First period	04:53 – Jeff Brown (2); 16:19 – pp – Michel Goulet (3)
No scoring		Second period	04:19 – Michel Goulet (4)
No scoring		Third period	09:44 – pp – Michel Goulet (5)
Mike Liut 33 saves / 37 shots		Goalie stats	Mario Gosselin 28 saves / 29 shots

April 14	Quebec Nordiques	7–5	Hartford Whalers	Hartford Civic Center	Recap
Robert Picard (2) – pp – 07:17; Jeff Brown (3) – pp – 15:10		First period	09:46 – Ron Francis (2); 13:38 – pp – Mike McEwen (1); 18:48 – Ray Ferraro (1)
John Ogrodnick (2) – pp – 07:59		Second period	No scoring
John Ogrodnick (3) – pp – 03:35; Michel Goulet (6) – pp – 04:08; John Ogrodnick (4) – 18:53; Mike Eagles (1) – en – 19:19		Third period	07:32 – Dean Evason (2); 11:19 – Stew Gavin (2)
Mario Gosselin 38 saves / 43 shots		Goalie stats	Mike Liut 17 saves / 23 shots

April 16	Hartford Whalers	4–5	OT	Quebec Nordiques	Colisée de Québec	Recap
Dean Evason (3) – 01:06; Dave Babych (1) – pp – 06:43; Kevin Dineen (1) – 13:32		First period		03:22 – Lane Lambert (2)
Kevin Dineen (2) – pp – 06:24		Second period		13:47 – pp – Peter Stastny (5); 14:17 – John Ogrodnick (5)
No scoring		Third period		07:05 – pp – Jason Lafreniere (1)
No scoring		First overtime period		06:08 – Peter Stastny (6)
Mike Liut 29 saves / 34 shots		Goalie stats		Mario Gosselin 31 saves / 35 shots

Quebec won series 4–2

==== (A2) Montreal Canadiens vs. (A3) Boston Bruins ====
This was the 22nd playoff series between these two teams. Montreal lead 19–2 in previous playoff series. This was the fourth straight year meeting in the Division Semifinals. Montreal won last year's Adams Division Semifinals in a three-game sweep.

April 8	Boston Bruins	2–6	Montreal Canadiens	Montreal Forum	Recap
Tom McCarthy (1) – pp – 08:19		First period	04:37 – pp – Larry Robinson (1); 04:56 – Guy Carbonneau (1); 05:48 – Stephane Richer (1); 19:12 – Mats Naslund (1)
Ken Linseman (1) – 02:25		Second period	18:27 – Kjell Dahlin (1); 19:16 – Chris Nilan (1)
No scoring		Third period	No scoring
Doug Keans 22 saves / 28 shots		Goalie stats	Patrick Roy 31 saves / 33 shots

April 9	Boston Bruins	3–4	OT	Montreal Canadiens	Montreal Forum	Recap
No scoring		First period		09:02 – Kjell Dahlin (2)
Cam Neely (1) – 13:26		Second period		10:23 – Claude Lemieux (1)
Cam Neely (2) – pp – 07:44; Cam Neely (3) – 11:46		Third period		10:30 – Bobby Smith (1)
No scoring		First overtime period		02:38 – Mats Naslund (2)
Bill Ranford 21 saves / 25 shots		Goalie stats		Patrick Roy 25 saves / 28 shots

April 11	Montreal Canadiens	5–4	Boston Bruins	Boston Garden	Recap
Mike McPhee (1) – 12:36; Bobby Smith (2) – pp – 14:36; Chris Chelios (1) – sh – 15:24		First period	02:24 – sh – Rick Middleton (1)
Mike McPhee (2) – 07:34; Mike McPhee (3) – pp – 09:50		Second period	07:17 – Ray Bourque (1); 14:59 – pp – Rick Middleton (2)
No scoring		Third period	13:28 – pp – Cam Neely (4)
Patrick Roy 25 saves / 29 shots		Goalie stats	Doug Keans 25 saves / 30 shots

April 12	Montreal Canadiens	4–2	Boston Bruins	Boston Garden	Recap
Chris Chelios (2) – pp – 18:21		First period	07:26 – Randy Burridge (1)
Bobby Smith (3) – 12:36; Mike McPhee (4) – 13:06		Second period	04:17 – pp – Cam Neely (5)
Shayne Corson (1) – 02:53		Third period	No scoring
Patrick Roy 35 saves / 37 shots		Goalie stats	Bill Ranford 26 saves / 30 shots

Montreal won series 4–0

==== (P1) Philadelphia Flyers vs. (P4) New York Rangers ====
This was the eighth playoff series meeting between these two teams. New York won four of the previous seven meetings, including last year's Patrick Division Semifinals in a 3–2 series upset.

April 8	New York Rangers	3–0	Philadelphia Flyers	Spectrum	Recap
No scoring		First period	No scoring
Pierre Larouche (1) – 02:57; Ron Duguay (1) – 03:24		Second period	No scoring
Pierre Larouche (2) – 17:13		Third period	No scoring
John Vanbiesbrouck 26 saves / 26 shots		Goalie stats	Ron Hextall 24 saves / 27 shots

April 9	New York Rangers	3–8	Philadelphia Flyers	Spectrum	Recap
No scoring		First period	17:24 – Brad Marsh (1)
Marcel Dionne (1) – pp – 05:43; Don Maloney (1) – 18:51		Second period	10:01 – Scott Mellanby (1); 19:56 – Rick Tocchet (1)
Don Maloney (2) – 16:26		Third period	05:19 – Tim Kerr (1); 06:22 – Dave Poulin (1); 13:40 – sh – Rick Tocchet (2); 17:30 – Derrick Smith (1); 17:50 – Peter Zezel (1)
John Vanbiesbrouck 29 saves / 34 shots Bob Froese 8 saves / 11 shots		Goalie stats	Ron Hextall 24 saves / 27 shots

April 11	Philadelphia Flyers	3–0	New York Rangers	Madison Square Garden	Recap
No scoring		First period	No scoring
Peter Zezel (2) – sh – 05:28; Mark Howe (1) – 05:41; Rick Tocchet (3) – 11:34		Second period	No scoring
No scoring		Third period	No scoring
Ron Hextall 34 saves / 34 shots		Goalie stats	John Vanbiesbrouck 31 saves / 34 shots

April 12	Philadelphia Flyers	3–6	New York Rangers	Madison Square Garden	Recap
No scoring		First period	01:03 – Tomas Sandstrom (1); 04:08 – Jeff Jackson (1); 10:31 – pp – George McPhee (1)
Brian Propp (1) – pp – 05:54		Second period	18:31 – pp – Ron Duguay (2); 19:31 – pp – James Patrick (1)
Dave Poulin (2) – pp – 03:51; Murray Craven (1) – 07:20		Third period	19:36 – en – Jan Erixon (1)
Ron Hextall 21 saves / 26 shots Glenn Resch 7 saves / 7 shots		Goalie stats	Bob Froese 25 saves / 28 shots

April 14	New York Rangers	1–3	Philadelphia Flyers	Spectrum	Recap
No scoring		First period	No scoring
Pierre Larouche (3) – 09:46		Second period	02:02 – Rick Tocchet (4); 14:13 – Tim Kerr (2)
No scoring		Third period	19:34 – en – Rick Tocchet (5)
Bob Froese 37 saves / 39 shots		Goalie stats	Ron Hextall 21 saves / 22 shots

April 16	Philadelphia Flyers	5–0	New York Rangers	Madison Square Garden	Recap
Derrick Smith (2) – 09:18; Doug Crossman (1) – 17:00		First period	No scoring
Brad Marsh (2) – 08:35; Tim Kerr (3) – pp – 13:14		Second period	No scoring
Lindsay Carson (1) – 05:21		Third period	No scoring
Ron Hextall 34 saves / 34 shots		Goalie stats	John Vanbiesbrouck 13 saves / 16 shots Bob Froese 15 saves / 17 shots

Philadelphia won series 4–2

==== (P2) Washington Capitals vs. (P3) New York Islanders ====
This was the fifth playoff series meeting between these two teams. New York won three of the previous four series all in the past four years. Washington won last year's Patrick Division Semifinals in a three-game sweep.

Game seven of this series went four overtimes, and is known as the Easter Epic. It was the only one this year to go beyond one OT period.

April 8	New York Islanders	3–4	Washington Capitals	Capital Centre	Recap
No scoring		First period	00:15 – Mike Gartner (1); 08:10 – Gaetan Duchesne (1); 12:00 – Kelly Miller (1)
Patrick Flatley (1) – 13:12		Second period	No scoring
Mike Bossy (1) – pp – 10:47; Bryan Trottier (1) – 18:57		Third period	08:30 – Mike Ridley (1)
Kelly Hrudey 28 saves / 32 shots		Goalie stats	Pete Peeters 25 saves / 28 shots

April 9	New York Islanders	3–1	Washington Capitals	Capital Centre	Recap
Steve Konroyd (1) – 02:41		First period	No scoring
No scoring		Second period	No scoring
Bryan Trottier (2) – pp – 17:20; Bryan Trottier (3) – en – 19:43		Third period	13:46 – Mike Ridley (2)
Kelly Hrudey 27 saves / 28 shots		Goalie stats	Pete Peeters 21 saves / 23 shots

April 11	Washington Capitals	2–0	New York Islanders	Nassau Coliseum	Recap
Larry Murphy (1) – 14:08		First period	No scoring
No scoring		Second period	No scoring
Gaetan Duchesne (2) – en – 19:32		Third period	No scoring
Bob Mason 26 saves / 26 shots		Goalie stats	Kelly Hrudey 30 saves / 31 shots

April 12	Washington Capitals	4–1	New York Islanders	Nassau Coliseum	Recap
Larry Murphy (2) – 11:08; Dave Christian (1) – 18:26; Mike Gartner (2) – 19:47		First period	10:25 – pp – Brad Lauer (1)
Mike Gartner (3) – 15:57		Second period	No scoring
No scoring		Third period	No scoring
Bob Mason 25 saves / 26 shots		Goalie stats	Kelly Hrudey 33 saves / 37 shots

April 14	New York Islanders	4–2	Washington Capitals	Capital Centre	Recap
Brad Lauer (2) – 05:06; Pat LaFontaine (1) – 05:26		First period	No scoring
Greg Gilbert (1) – 14:13		Second period	05:25 – pp – Greg Adams (1); 10:58 – Kevin Hatcher (1)
Patrick Flatley (2) – 17:49		Third period	No scoring
Kelly Hrudey 40 saves / 42 shots		Goalie stats	Pete Peeters 20 saves / 24 shots

April 16	Washington Capitals	4–5	New York Islanders	Nassau Coliseum	Recap
No scoring		First period	15:34 – Bryan Trottier (4); 18:51 – Duane Sutter (1)
Michal Pivonka (1) – 04:26; Gaetan Duchesne (3) – 06:58; Ed Kastelic (1) – pp – 09:31		Second period	11:31 – pp – Pat LaFontaine (2); 14:27 – Mikko Mäkelä (1); 16:27 – Pat LaFontaine (3)
Kelly Miller (2) – 06:19		Third period	No scoring
Bob Mason 29 saves / 34 shots		Goalie stats	Kelly Hrudey 23 saves / 27 shots

April 18	New York Islanders	3–2	4OT	Washington Capitals	Capital Centre	Recap
No scoring		First period		19:12 – Mike Gartner (4)
Patrick Flatley (3) – 11:35		Second period		18:45 – Grant Martin (1)
Bryan Trottier (5) – 14:37		Third period		No scoring
Pat LaFontaine (4) – 08:47		Fourth overtime period		No scoring
Kelly Hrudey 73 saves / 75 shots		Goalie stats		Bob Mason 54 saves / 57 shots

New York won series 4–3

=== Clarence Campbell Conference ===
==== (N1) St. Louis Blues vs. (N4) Toronto Maple Leafs ====
This was the second playoff series meeting between these two teams. This was a rematch of last year's Norris Division Finals, in which St. Louis won in seven games.

April 8	Toronto Maple Leafs	1–3	St. Louis Blues	St. Louis Arena	Recap
No scoring		First period	14:28 – pp – Rob Ramage (1)
Rick Vaive (1) – 15:15		Second period	00:41 – Doug Gilmour (1); 02:43 – pp – Gino Cavallini (1)
No scoring		Third period	No scoring
Ken Wregget 23 saves / 26 shots		Goalie stats	Greg Millen 28 saves / 29 shots

April 9	Toronto Maple Leafs	3–2	OT	St. Louis Blues	St. Louis Arena	Recap
Todd Gill (1) – 03:17		First period		13:00 – pp – Rob Ramage (2)
No scoring		Second period		No scoring
Wendel Clark (1) – 14:16		Third period		14:57 – Greg Paslawski (1)
Rick Lanz (1) – 10:17		First overtime period		No scoring
Ken Wregget 28 saves / 30 shots		Goalie stats		Greg Millen 30 saves / 33 shots

April 11	St. Louis Blues	5–3	Toronto Maple Leafs	Maple Leaf Gardens	Recap
Bernie Federko (1) – pp – 12:51; Gino Cavallini (2) – 19:14		First period	00:31 – Dan Daoust (1); 09:21 – Russ Courtnall (1)
No scoring		Second period	07:20 – pp – Wendel Clark (2)
Doug Gilmour (2) – pp – 05:04; Gino Cavallini (3) – 14:09; Bernie Federko (2) – en – 19:59		Third period	No scoring
Rick Wamsley 22 saves / 25 shots		Goalie stats	Ken Wregget 28 saves / 32 shots

April 12	St. Louis Blues	1–2	Toronto Maple Leafs	Maple Leaf Gardens	Recap
Bruce Bell (1) – 13:04		First period	08:47 – pp – Rick Vaive (2)
No scoring		Second period	No scoring
No scoring		Third period	01:43 – Dan Daoust (2)
Rick Wamsley 27 saves / 29 shots		Goalie stats	Ken Wregget 27 saves / 28 shots

April 14	Toronto Maple Leafs	2–1	St. Louis Blues	St. Louis Arena	Recap
No scoring		First period	02:31 – Bernie Federko (3)
No scoring		Second period	No scoring
Mark Osborne (1) – 00:13; Mike Allison (1) – 11:24		Third period	No scoring
Ken Wregget 33 saves / 34 shots		Goalie stats	Greg Millen 33 saves / 35 shots

April 16	St. Louis Blues	0–4	Toronto Maple Leafs	Maple Leaf Gardens	Recap
No scoring		First period	02:55 – Brad Smith (1)
No scoring		Second period	No scoring
No scoring		Third period	04:07 – Bill Root (1); 06:12 – Russ Courtnall (2); 17:51 – Peter Ihnacak (1)
Greg Millen 21 saves / 25 shots		Goalie stats	Ken Wregget 19 saves / 19 shots

Toronto won series 4–2

==== (N2) Detroit Red Wings vs. (N3) Chicago Blackhawks ====
This was the 11th playoff series between these two teams. Chicago lead 6–4 in previous playoff meetings. Chicago won the most recent meeting in a three-game sweep in the 1985 Norris Division Semifinals.

April 8	Chicago Blackhawks	1–3	Detroit Red Wings	Joe Louis Arena	Recap
No scoring		First period	03:09 – Petr Klima (1); 14:54 – pp – Darren Veitch (1)
No scoring		Second period	No scoring
Bob Murray (1) – 10:09		Third period	12:18 – Shawn Burr (1)
Bob Sauve 26 saves / 29 shots		Goalie stats	Greg Stefan 19 saves / 20 shots

April 9	Chicago Blackhawks	1–5	Detroit Red Wings	Joe Louis Arena	Recap
No scoring		First period	00:37 – Gerard Gallant (1); 08:35 – pp – Joey Kocur (1)
Marc Bergevin (1) – 13:33		Second period	05:07 – pp – Steve Yzerman (1); 14:09 – Shawn Burr (2)
No scoring		Third period	06:46 – Adam Oates (1)
Bob Sauve 34 saves / 39 shots		Goalie stats	Greg Stefan 14 saves / 15 shots

April 11	Detroit Red Wings	4–3	OT	Chicago Blackhawks	Chicago Stadium	Recap
Steve Yzerman (2) – 05:28; Mel Bridgman (1) – sh – 06:28; Mel Bridgman (2) – 19:17		First period		No scoring
No scoring		Second period		02:23 – Denis Savard (1)
No scoring		Third period		00:21 – Curt Fraser (1); 13:23 – Eddie Olczyk (1)
Shawn Burr (3) – 04:51		First overtime period		No scoring
Glen Hanlon 36 saves / 39 shots		Goalie stats		Bob Sauve 31 saves / 35 shots

April 12	Detroit Red Wings	3–1	Chicago Blackhawks	Chicago Stadium	Recap
Brent Ashton (1) – pp – 13:37		First period	No scoring
Mel Bridgman (3) – 00:35; Dave Barr (1) – 10:07		Second period	09:26 – Wayne Presley (1)
No scoring		Third period	No scoring
Greg Stefan 46 saves / 47 shots		Goalie stats	Bob Sauve 30 saves / 33 shots

Detroit won series 4–0

==== (S1) Edmonton Oilers vs. (S4) Los Angeles Kings ====
This was the third playoff series meeting between these two teams. Both teams split their previous two meetings. Edmonton won in a three-game sweep in their most recent meeting in the 1985 Smythe Division Semifinals.

April 8	Los Angeles Kings	5–2	Edmonton Oilers	Northlands Coliseum	Recap
Dave Taylor (1) – pp – 15:28; Jay Wells (1) – pp – 15:56		First period	01:04 – Randy Gregg (1); 18:26 – pp – Glenn Anderson (1)
No scoring		Second period	No scoring
Tiger Williams (1) – 05:04; Bobby Carpenter (1) – 13:36; Bob Bourne (1) – 19:40		Third period	No scoring
Roland Melanson 29 saves / 31 shots		Goalie stats	Grant Fuhr 29 saves / 33 shots

April 9	Los Angeles Kings	3–13	Edmonton Oilers	Northlands Coliseum	Recap
Bernie Nicholls (1) – 10:29		First period	02:51 – pp – Jari Kurri (1); 05:17 – Glenn Anderson (2); 06:26 – Jari Kurri (2); 10:49 – Randy Gregg (2); 14:09 – pp – Esa Tikkanen (1); 17:03 – Mark Messier (1)
Bernie Nicholls (2) – pp – 04:29; Jim Fox (1) – pp – 18:28		Second period	03:50 – sh – Mark Messier (2); 06:15 – Kent Nilsson (1); 14:05 – pp – Kent Nilsson (2)
No scoring		Third period	01:56 – Wayne Gretzky (1); 07:30 – pp – Jari Kurri (3); 07:50 – Moe Lemay (1); 17:41 – pp – Jari Kurri (4)
Roland Melanson 10 saves / 16 shots Darren Eliot 22 saves / 29 shots		Goalie stats	Andy Moog 11 saves / 14 shots

April 11	Edmonton Oilers	6–5	Los Angeles Kings	The Forum	Recap
Esa Tikkanen (2) – 05:12; Mike Krushelnyski (1) – 07:28		First period	03:13 – Bryan Erickson (1); 13:15 – Tiger Williams (2)
Mark Messier (3) – 08:50; Jari Kurri (5) – 13:28		Second period	No scoring
Mark Messier (4) – 05:30; Jari Kurri (6) – 09:10		Third period	02:55 – Tiger Williams (3); 12:19 – Jim Fox (2); 19:53 – Luc Robitaille (1)
Andy Moog 18 saves / 23 shots		Goalie stats	Roland Melanson 29 saves / 35 shots

April 12	Edmonton Oilers	6–3	Los Angeles Kings	The Forum	Recap
No scoring		First period	No scoring
Kent Nilsson (3) – 11:22; Jari Kurri (7) – 19:00		Second period	06:38 – Bob Bourne (2); 19:21 – Jimmy Carson (1)
Steve Smith (1) – 04:43; Esa Tikkanen (3) – 07:49; Esa Tikkanen (4) – 16:08; Wayne Gretzky (2) – en – 19:34		Third period	08:15 – Steve Duchesne (1)
Grant Fuhr 23 saves / 26 shots		Goalie stats	Roland Melanson 31 saves / 36 shots

April 14	Los Angeles Kings	4–5	Edmonton Oilers	Northlands Coliseum	Recap
Jim Fox (3) – 04:06		First period	01:22 – Esa Tikkanen (5)
Dave Taylor (2) – 12:08; Steve Duchesne (2) – pp – 16:08		Second period	06:45 – pp – Mark Messier (5); 10:53 – pp – Glenn Anderson (3)
Mark Hardy (1) – 15:47		Third period	07:53 – Esa Tikkanen (6); 10:47 – Glenn Anderson (4)
Roland Melanson 30 saves / 35 shots		Goalie stats	Grant Fuhr 26 saves / 30 shots

Edmonton won series 4–1

==== (S2) Calgary Flames vs. (S3) Winnipeg Jets ====
This was the third playoff series meeting between these two teams. Both teams split their previous two meetings over the prior two years. Calgary won last year's Smythe Division Semifinals in a three-game sweep.

This was the last time the Jets won a playoff series until 2018.

April 8	Winnipeg Jets	4–2	Calgary Flames	Olympic Saddledome	Recap
Thomas Steen (1) – 05:03		First period	13:02 – pp – Mike Bullard (1); 19:26 – pp – Al MacInnis (1)
Dale Hawerchuk (1) – 07:51; Mario Marois (1) – 08:52		Second period	No scoring
Dale Hawerchuk (2) – pp – 02:20		Third period	No scoring
Daniel Berthiaume 18 saves / 20 shots		Goalie stats	Rejean Lemelin 26 saves / 30 shots

April 9	Winnipeg Jets	3–2	Calgary Flames	Olympic Saddledome	Recap
No scoring		First period	No scoring
Paul MacLean (1) – 07:08; Paul MacLean (2) – 15:24; Thomas Steen (2) – sh – 19:59		Second period	02:35 – pp – Mike Bullard (2); 17:59 – pp – Mike Bullard (3)
No scoring		Third period	No scoring
Daniel Berthiaume 25 saves / 27 shots		Goalie stats	Mike Vernon 22 saves / 25 shots

April 11	Calgary Flames	3–2	OT	Winnipeg Jets	Winnipeg Arena	Recap
Steve Bozek (1) – 14:27; Joe Mullen (1) – pp – 19:29		First period		04:46 – Randy Carlyle (1); 13:19 – pp – Paul MacLean (3)
No scoring		Second period		No scoring
No scoring		Third period		No scoring
Mike Bullard (4) – 03:53		First overtime period		No scoring
Mike Vernon 26 saves / 28 shots		Goalie stats		Daniel Berthiaume 31 saves / 34 shots

April 12	Calgary Flames	3–4	Winnipeg Jets	Winnipeg Arena	Recap
Hakan Loob (1) – sh – 17:35		First period	No scoring
Brett Hull (1) – 05:03		Second period	10:15 – pp – Brian Mullen (1); 15:34 – Doug Smail (1)
Joe Nieuwendyk (1) – 17:16		Third period	01:09 – pp – Dale Hawerchuk (3); 14:33 – Gilles Hamel (1)
Mike Vernon 40 saves / 44 shots		Goalie stats	Daniel Berthiaume 22 saves / 25 shots

April 14	Winnipeg Jets	3–4	Calgary Flames	Olympic Saddledome	Recap
Fredrik Olausson (1) – pp – 05:54		First period	02:00 – Carey Wilson (1); 15:13 – Brett Hull (2)
Paul MacLean (4) – pp – 06:47; Dale Hawerchuk (4) – 10:48		Second period	05:22 – Joe Nieuwendyk (2)
No scoring		Third period	04:28 – Joe Mullen (2)
Daniel Berthiaume 27 saves / 31 shots		Goalie stats	Mike Vernon 25 saves / 28 shots

April 16	Calgary Flames	1–6	Winnipeg Jets	Winnipeg Arena	Recap
No scoring		First period	02:37 – Ron Wilson (1); 13:17 – Gilles Hamel (2); 14:12 – pp – Dale Hawerchuk (5); 19:04 – Doug Smail (2)
Jim Peplinski (1) – 12:57		Second period	19:02 – pp – Brian Mullen (2)
No scoring		Third period	16:18 – Doug Smail (3)
Mike Vernon 7 saves / 11 shots Rejean Lemelin 15 saves / 17 shots		Goalie stats	Daniel Berthiaume 34 saves / 35 shots

Winnipeg won series 4–2

== Division finals ==
=== Prince of Wales Conference ===
==== (A2) Montreal Canadiens vs. (A4) Quebec Nordiques ====
This was the fourth playoff series meeting between these two teams. Quebec won two of the previous three meetings, including their most recent meeting in the 1985 Adams Division Finals in seven games.

In game six, the Nordiques came back from a 2–0 deficit scoring three goals in the third period to force a game seven and keep their season alive.

April 20	Quebec Nordiques	7–5	Montreal Canadiens	Montreal Forum	Recap
Michel Goulet (7) – 09:38		First period	04:27 – Bobby Smith (4); 16:17 – Stephane Richer (2)
Anton Stastny (1) – 01:31; Basil McRae (1) – 11:45; Anton Stastny (2) – 17:16		Second period	12:40 – pp – Claude Lemieux (2); 13:18 – Craig Ludwig (1)
Dale Hunter (1) – pp – 02:04; John Ogrodnick (6) – 05:22; Paul Gillis (1) – 07:21		Third period	16:07 – John Kordic (1)
Mario Gosselin 27 saves / 32 shots		Goalie stats	Patrick Roy 19 saves / 26 shots Brian Hayward 2 saves / 2 shots

April 22	Quebec Nordiques	2–1	Montreal Canadiens	Montreal Forum	Recap
No scoring		First period	No scoring
No scoring		Second period	No scoring
Michel Goulet (8) – 02:47; Basil McRae (2) – 03:04		Third period	05:21 – pp – Ryan Walter (1)
Mario Gosselin 27 saves / 28 shots		Goalie stats	Brian Hayward 24 saves / 26 shots

April 24	Montreal Canadiens	7–2	Quebec Nordiques	Colisée de Québec	Recap
Sergio Momesso (1) – 00:14; Bob Gainey (1) – 06:18		First period	No scoring
Mats Naslund (3) – pp – 13:10; Mike Lalor (1) – 17:00		Second period	00:37 – pp – Risto Siltanen (1); 15:49 – Normand Rochefort (1)
Ryan Walter (2) – 09:52; Mike Lalor (2) – 16:51; Shayne Corson (2) – 19:43		Third period	No scoring
Brian Hayward 24 saves / 26 shots		Goalie stats	Mario Gosselin 22 saves / 29 shots

April 26	Montreal Canadiens	3–2	OT	Quebec Nordiques	Colisée de Québec	Recap
Mats Naslund (4) – pp – 00:18; Mike McPhee (5) – 02:47		First period		19:20 – John Ogrodnick (7)
No scoring		Second period		05:30 – Anton Stastny (3)
No scoring		Third period		No scoring
Mats Naslund (5) – 05:30		First overtime period		No scoring
Brian Hayward 28 saves / 30 shots		Goalie stats		Mario Gosselin 24 saves / 27 shots

April 28	Quebec Nordiques	2–3	Montreal Canadiens	Montreal Forum	Recap
No scoring		First period	09:22 – sh – Shayne Corson (3)
Alain Cote (1) – 01:52		Second period	09:33 – pp – Ryan Walter (3)
Paul Gillis (2) – 00:38		Third period	17:21 – Ryan Walter (4)
Clint Malarchuk 19 saves / 22 shots		Goalie stats	Brian Hayward 22 saves / 24 shots

April 30	Montreal Canadiens	2–3	Quebec Nordiques	Colisée de Québec	Recap
Shayne Corson (4) – 09:40		First period	No scoring
Chris Nilan (2) – 03:34		Second period	No scoring
No scoring		Third period	05:22 – Michel Goulet (9); 13:37 – John Ogrodnick (8); 15:23 – Normand Rochefort (2)
Brian Hayward 24 saves / 27 shots		Goalie stats	Mario Gosselin 16 saves / 18 shots

May 2	Quebec Nordiques	3–5	Montreal Canadiens	Montreal Forum	Recap
John Ogrodnick (9) – pp – 08:22		First period	No scoring
No scoring		Second period	02:03 – sh – Ryan Walter (5); 05:38 – Ryan Walter (6); 16:17 – Bobby Smith (5); 19:29 – Shayne Corson (5); 19:46 – Mike McPhee (6)
Basil McRae (3) – 06:06; Alain Cote (2) – 19:08		Third period	No scoring
Mario Gosselin 9 saves / 14 shots Clint Malarchuk 5 saves / 5 shots		Goalie stats	Brian Hayward 28 saves / 31 shots

Montreal won series 4–3

==== (P1) Philadelphia Flyers vs. (P3) New York Islanders ====
This was the fourth playoff series meeting between these two teams. Philadelphia won two of the previous three series, including their most recent in the 1985 Patrick Division Finals in five games.

In game 2, Mikko Makela scored the game-winning goal with three seconds left to tie the series for the Islanders.

April 20	New York Islanders	2–4	Philadelphia Flyers	Spectrum	Recap
No scoring		First period	02:55 – Tim Kerr (4); 07:15 – pp – Tim Kerr (5); 14:21 – Don Nachbaur (1)
Tomas Jonsson (1) – pp – 07:03		Second period	03:11 – pp – Tim Kerr (6)
Greg Gilbert (2) – 19:48		Third period	No scoring
Kelly Hrudey 12 saves / 15 shots Billy Smith 7 saves / 8 shots		Goalie stats	Ron Hextall 26 saves / 28 shots

April 22	New York Islanders	2–1	Philadelphia Flyers	Spectrum	Recap
No scoring		First period	No scoring
No scoring		Second period	No scoring
Denis Potvin (1) – pp – 07:57; Mikko Mäkelä (2) – pp – 19:57		Third period	05:53 – pp – Doug Crossman (2)
Kelly Hrudey 40 saves / 41 shots		Goalie stats	Ron Hextall 24 saves / 26 shots

April 24	Philadelphia Flyers	4–1	New York Islanders	Nassau Coliseum	Recap
Al Hill (1) – 11:41		First period	No scoring
Brian Propp (2) – 10:21; Mark Howe (2) – 16:13		Second period	16:24 – Pat LaFontaine (5)
Pelle Eklund (1) – en – 19:40		Third period	No scoring
Ron Hextall 23 saves / 24 shots		Goalie stats	Kelly Hrudey 30 saves / 33 shots

April 26	Philadelphia Flyers	6–4	New York Islanders	Nassau Coliseum	Recap
Brian Propp (3) – pp – 08:00; Al Hill (2) – 18:35		First period	05:00 – Alan Kerr (1); 10:29 – Ken Morrow (1)
Tim Kerr (7) – pp – 06:06; Tim Tookey (1) – 07:14; Tim Kerr (8) – pp – 12:46		Second period	02:50 – pp – Bryan Trottier (6)
Rick Tocchet (6) – en – 19:13		Third period	07:39 – pp – Brent Sutter (1)
Ron Hextall 23 saves / 27 shots		Goalie stats	Kelly Hrudey 10 saves / 15 shots Billy Smith 13 saves / 13 shots

April 28	New York Islanders	2–1	Philadelphia Flyers	Spectrum	Recap
No scoring		First period	No scoring
Richard Kromm (1) – 14:18		Second period	05:56 – Lindsay Carson (2)
Randy Wood (1) – 03:27		Third period	No scoring
Kelly Hrudey 24 saves / 25 shots		Goalie stats	Ron Hextall 25 saves / 27 shots

April 30	Philadelphia Flyers	2–4	New York Islanders	Nassau Coliseum	Recap
No scoring		First period	03:22 – pp – Mike Bossy (2); 16:12 – Bryan Trottier (7)
Brad McCrimmon (1) – 00:53		Second period	No scoring
Brian Propp (4) – pp – 02:48		Third period	02:09 – pp – Bryan Trottier (8); 10:34 – Bob Bassen (1)
Ron Hextall 26 saves / 30 shots		Goalie stats	Kelly Hrudey 25 saves / 27 shots

May 2	New York Islanders	1–5	Philadelphia Flyers	Spectrum	Recap
No scoring		First period	06:21 – Dave Brown (1); 09:57 – sh – Brian Propp (5); 10:41 – sh – Brad Marsh (3)
No scoring		Second period	No scoring
Denis Potvin (2) – 19:07		Third period	06:19 – Ilkka Sinisalo (1); 16:52 – Ilkka Sinisalo (2)
Kelly Hrudey 29 saves / 34 shots		Goalie stats	Ron Hextall 22 saves / 23 shots

Philadelphia won series 4–3

=== Clarence Campbell Conference ===
==== (N2) Detroit Red Wings vs. (N4) Toronto Maple Leafs ====
This was the 21st playoff series between these two teams. Toronto led 11–9 in previous playoff series. They last met in the 1964 Stanley Cup Finals, in which Toronto won in seven games. This was the only Norris final not to involve either the Chicago Blackhawks or St. Louis Blues.

April 21	Toronto Maple Leafs	4–2	Detroit Red Wings	Joe Louis Arena	Recap
Dan Daoust (3) – 12:29		First period	17:44 – Mel Bridgman (4); 18:15 – Mike O'Connell (1)
Rick Vaive (3) – 01:25; Wendel Clark (3) – 05:02; Todd Gill (2) – 07:55		Second period	No scoring
No scoring		Third period	No scoring
Ken Wregget 32 saves / 34 shots		Goalie stats	Greg Stefan 13 saves / 17 shots Glen Hanlon 12 saves / 12 shots

April 23	Toronto Maple Leafs	7–2	Detroit Red Wings	Joe Louis Arena	Recap
Steve Thomas (1) – pp – 05:30; Rick Vaive (4) – 11:02; Dan Daoust (4) – 11:28		First period	No scoring
Russ Courtnall (3) – pp – 08:59		Second period	00:17 – pp – Darren Veitch (2)
Peter Ihnacak (2) – 02:02; Steve Thomas (2) – 09:20; Al Iafrate (1) – pp – 14:10		Third period	17:40 – pp – Brent Ashton (2)
Ken Wregget 30 saves / 32 shots		Goalie stats	Greg Stefan 14 saves / 21 shots

April 25	Detroit Red Wings	4–2	Toronto Maple Leafs	Maple Leaf Gardens	Recap
Gerard Gallant (2) – 07:49; Shawn Burr (4) – 12:28		First period	06:58 – pp – Mike Allison (2); 13:06 – Dan Daoust (5)
Shawn Burr (5) – 00:49		Second period	No scoring
Gerard Gallant (3) – 07:58		Third period	No scoring
Glen Hanlon 20 saves / 22 shots		Goalie stats	Ken Wregget 10 saves / 13 shots Allan Bester 16 saves / 17 shots

April 27	Detroit Red Wings	2–3	OT	Toronto Maple Leafs	Maple Leaf Gardens	Recap
No scoring		First period		No scoring
Mel Bridgman (5) – 02:32		Second period		16:27 – Wendel Clark (4)
Gerard Gallant (4) – pp – 00:53		Third period		13:47 – pp – Wendel Clark (5)
No scoring		First overtime period		09:31 – Mike Allison (3)
Glen Hanlon 47 saves / 50 shots		Goalie stats		Ken Wregget 30 saves / 32 shots

April 29	Toronto Maple Leafs	0–3	Detroit Red Wings	Joe Louis Arena	Recap
No scoring		First period	06:03 – Lee Norwood (1)
No scoring		Second period	03:25 – Adam Oates (2)
No scoring		Third period	08:06 – Brent Ashton (3)
Ken Wregget 29 saves / 32 shots		Goalie stats	Glen Hanlon 30 saves / 30 shots

May 1	Detroit Red Wings	4–2	Toronto Maple Leafs	Maple Leaf Gardens	Recap
Gerard Gallant (5) – 08:35		First period	12:59 – pp – Wendel Clark (6)
Adam Oates (3) – 10:50		Second period	08:55 – pp – Vincent Damphousse (1)
Bob Probert (1) – 10:29; Shawn Burr (6) – 19:49		Third period	No scoring
Glen Hanlon 22 saves / 24 shots		Goalie stats	Ken Wregget 18 saves / 21 shots

May 3	Toronto Maple Leafs	0–3	Detroit Red Wings	Joe Louis Arena	Recap
No scoring		First period	02:51 – Adam Oates (4)
No scoring		Second period	03:57 – Steve Yzerman (3); 05:08 – Darren Veitch (3)
No scoring		Third period	No scoring
Ken Wregget 30 saves / 33 shots		Goalie stats	Glen Hanlon 30 saves / 30 shots

Detroit won series 4–3

==== (S1) Edmonton Oilers vs. (S3) Winnipeg Jets ====
This was the fourth playoff series meeting between these two teams. Edmonton won all three previous meetings, including their most recent in the 1985 Smythe Division Finals in a four-game sweep.

April 21	Winnipeg Jets	2–3	OT	Edmonton Oilers	Northlands Coliseum	Recap
Laurie Boschman (1) – 01:20		First period		17:13 – Glenn Anderson (5)
Brian Mullen (3) – 02:32		Second period		11:27 – Dave Hunter (1)
No scoring		Third period		No scoring
No scoring		First overtime period		Glenn Anderson (6) – 00:36
Daniel Berthiaume 27 saves / 30 shots		Goalie stats		Grant Fuhr 14 saves / 16 shots

April 23	Winnipeg Jets	3–5	Edmonton Oilers	Northlands Coliseum	Recap
Thomas Steen (3) – 06:35		First period	16:18 – Charlie Huddy (1); 18:30 – Dave Hunter (2)
Ray Neufeld (1) – 19:04		Second period	06:09 – pp – Reijo Ruotsalainen (1); 15:23 – Moe Lemay (2)
Laurie Boschman (2) – pp – 16:16		Third period	08:09 – pp – Glenn Anderson (7)
Eldon Reddick 30 saves / 35 shots		Goalie stats	Grant Fuhr 27 saves / 30 shots

April 25	Edmonton Oilers	5–2	Winnipeg Jets	Winnipeg Arena	Recap
Esa Tikkanen (7) – 02:55		First period	No scoring
Jari Kurri (8) – 17:18		Second period	03:53 – sh – Doug Smail (4)
Jari Kurri (9) – 06:22; Mark Messier (6) – 07:57; Glenn Anderson (8) – en – 19:23		Third period	13:03 – Paul MacLean (5)
Grant Fuhr 35 saves / 37 shots		Goalie stats	Eldon Reddick 20 saves / 24 shots

April 27	Edmonton Oilers	4–2	Winnipeg Jets	Winnipeg Arena	Recap
Marty McSorley (1) – 05:27; Wayne Gretzky (3) – pp – 12:58; Reijo Ruotsalainen (2) – 13:46		First period	No scoring
Glenn Anderson (9) – 12:58		Second period	08:20 – Fredrik Olausson (2); 19:48 – Brian Mullen (4)
No scoring		Third period	No scoring
Grant Fuhr 22 saves / 24 shots		Goalie stats	Daniel Berthiaume 5 saves / 8 shots Eldon Reddick 13 saves / 14 shots

Edmonton won series 4–0

== Conference finals ==
=== Prince of Wales Conference final ===
==== (P1) Philadelphia Flyers vs. (A2) Montreal Canadiens ====
This was the third playoff series meeting between these two teams. Montreal won both previous meetings, including their last meeting in a four-game sweep in the 1976 Stanley Cup Finals.

Philadelphia defeated Montreal in six games. Rick Tocchet scored the game-winner at 7:11 of the third period in game six to send the Flyers to the Stanley Cup Final for the second time in three years.

May 4	Montreal Canadiens	3–4	OT	Philadelphia Flyers	Spectrum	Recap
Shayne Corson (6) – pp – 19:26		First period		17:51 – pp – Brian Propp (6)
Ryan Walter (7) – 18:25		Second period		No scoring
Bobby Smith (6) – 07:15		Third period		05:49 – Ilkka Sinisalo (3); 16:04 – Derrick Smith (3)
No scoring		First overtime period		09:11 – Illka Sinisalo (4)
Brian Hayward 33 saves / 37 shots		Goalie stats		Ron Hextall 33 saves / 36 shots

May 6	Montreal Canadiens	5–2	Philadelphia Flyers	Spectrum	Recap
Bobby Smith (7) – 11:38		First period	No scoring
Brian Skrudland (1) – 01:43; John Kordic (2) – 11:23; Claude Lemieux (3) – pp – 15:38		Second period	No scoring
Guy Carbonneau (2) – 14:06		Third period	05:29 – Derrick Smith (4); 10:46 – pp – Doug Crossman (3)
Brian Hayward 21 saves / 23 shots		Goalie stats	Ron Hextall 19 saves / 23 shots Glenn Resch 3 saves / 4 shots

May 8	Philadelphia Flyers	4–3	Montreal Canadiens	Montreal Forum	Recap
No scoring		First period	04:23 – Chris Nilan (3); 05:13 – pp – Chris Chelios (3)
Pelle Eklund (2) – 04:29; Pelle Eklund (3) – pp – 13:21		Second period	No scoring
Rick Tocchet (7) – 08:29; Brian Propp (7) – 16:51		Third period	12:35 – pp – Mats Naslund (6)
Ron Hextall 36 saves / 39 shots		Goalie stats	Brian Hayward 14 saves / 18 shots

May 10	Philadelphia Flyers	6–3	Montreal Canadiens	Montreal Forum	Recap
Ron Sutter (1) – 12:14		First period	No scoring
Brian Propp (8) – 01:18; Pelle Eklund (4) – 15:40		Second period	05:45 – pp – Mats Naslund (7); 13:39 – Stephane Richer (3)
Scott Mellanby (2) – 00:14; Pelle Eklund (5) – 01:28; Pelle Eklund (6) – 13:01		Third period	17:13 – Chris Chelios (4)
Ron Hextall 25 saves / 28 shots		Goalie stats	Patrick Roy 16 saves / 20 shots Brian Hayward 5 saves / 7 shots

May 12	Montreal Canadiens	5–2	Philadelphia Flyers	Spectrum	Recap
Bobby Smith (8) – 02:28; Larry Robinson (2) – pp – 14:48		First period	12:37 – Derrick Smith (5)
Craig Ludwig (2) – 13:29; Guy Carbonneau (3) – 13:48		Second period	14:36 – Scott Mellanby (3)
Claude Lemieux (4) – 19:26		Third period	No scoring
Brian Hayward 24 saves / 26 shots		Goalie stats	Ron Hextall 25 saves / 30 shots

May 14	Philadelphia Flyers	4–3	Montreal Canadiens	Montreal Forum	Recap
Dave Poulin (3) – sh – 14:34		First period	00:59 – Mike McPhee (7); 19:56 – Larry Robinson (3)
Ilkka Sinisalo (5) – 07:49; Scott Mellanby (4) – 09:40		Second period	07:00 – pp – Bobby Smith (9)
Rick Tocchet (8) – 07:11		Third period	No scoring
Ron Hextall 29 saves / 32 shots		Goalie stats	Brian Hayward 27 saves / 31 shots

Philadelphia won series 4–2

=== Clarence Campbell Conference final ===
==== (S1) Edmonton Oilers vs. (N2) Detroit Red Wings ====
This was the first playoff series meeting between these two teams.

May 5	Detroit Red Wings	3–1	Edmonton Oilers	Northlands Coliseum	Recap
Steve Yzerman (4) – 10:12; Joey Kocur (2) – 12:32		First period	10:36 – pp – Kent Nilsson (4)
No scoring		Second period	No scoring
Gerard Gallant (6) – 13:57		Third period	No scoring
Greg Stefan 31 saves / 32 shots		Goalie stats	Grant Fuhr 21 saves / 24 shots

May 7	Detroit Red Wings	1–4	Edmonton Oilers	Northlands Coliseum	Recap
No scoring		First period	00:52 – Mark Messier (7); 17:28 – sh – Jari Kurri (10)
Bob Probert (2) – pp – 15:27		Second period	No scoring
No scoring		Third period	18:38 – Mark Messier (8); 19:31 – en – Jaroslav Pouzar (1)
Greg Stefan 31 saves / 34 shots		Goalie stats	Grant Fuhr 17 saves / 18 shots

May 9	Edmonton Oilers	2–1	Detroit Red Wings	Joe Louis Arena	Recap
Craig MacTavish (1) – 05:41		First period	No scoring
No scoring		Second period	17:24 – Bob Probert (3)
Marty McSorley (2) – 19:24		Third period	No scoring
Grant Fuhr 21 saves / 22 shots		Goalie stats	Greg Stefan 26 saves / 28 shots

May 11	Edmonton Oilers	3–2	Detroit Red Wings	Joe Louis Arena	Recap
Dave Hunter (3) – 17:30		First period	No scoring
Glenn Anderson (10) – 15:34; Mike Krushelnyski (2) – 18:46		Second period	00:22 – Shawn Burr (7); 12:32 – Gerard Gallant (7)
No scoring		Third period	No scoring
Grant Fuhr 22 saves / 24 shots		Goalie stats	Glen Hanlon 17 saves / 20 shots

May 13	Detroit Red Wings	3–6	Edmonton Oilers	Northlands Coliseum	Recap
Gerard Gallant (8) – pp – 04:37; Brent Ashton (4) – 09:04		First period	06:40 – pp – Paul Coffey (1)
Steve Yzerman (5) – 02:14		Second period	04:38 – Kevin McClelland (1); 18:23 – Mark Messier (9)
No scoring		Third period	04:48 – Mark Messier (10); 19:11 – en – Kent Nilsson (5); 19:41 – en – Kent Nilsson (6)
Greg Stefan 31 saves / 35 shots		Goalie stats	Grant Fuhr 16 saves / 19 shots

Edmonton won series 4–1

== Stanley Cup Finals ==
This was the third playoff series between these two teams, and their second Finals meeting. Both teams split their previous two meetings. Edmonton won the 1985 Stanley Cup Finals in five games. This time, Edmonton was the regular season champion with 50 wins and 106 points, and Philadelphia was second with 46 wins and 100 points.

Unlike the 1985 final, this series would go the distance; and for the first time since 1971, the Stanley Cup Finals went the full seven games. Edmonton took the first two games at home, then split in Philadelphia. However, the Flyers won the next two games, one in Edmonton and one back in Philadelphia by one goal after overcoming two-goal deficits in both games facing elimination, to force a deciding seventh game. Edmonton won game seven to earn its third Stanley Cup in four seasons.

May 17	Philadelphia Flyers	2–4	Edmonton Oilers	Northlands Coliseum	Recap
No scoring		First period	15:06 – Wayne Gretzky (4)
Brian Propp (9) – 16:08		Second period	No scoring
Rick Tocchet (9) – 10:18		Third period	00:48 – Glenn Anderson (11); 07:09 – Paul Coffey (2); 09:11 – Jari Kurri (11)
Ron Hextall 22 saves / 26 shots		Goalie stats	Grant Fuhr 29 saves / 31 shots

May 20	Philadelphia Flyers	2–3	OT	Edmonton Oilers	Northlands Coliseum	Recap
No scoring		First period		No scoring
Derrick Smith (6) – 13:20; Brian Propp (10) – 16:23		Second period		00:45 – pp – Wayne Gretzky (5)
No scoring		Third period		11:40 – Glenn Anderson (12)
No scoring		First overtime period		06:50 – Jari Kurri (12)
Ron Hextall 31 saves / 34 shots		Goalie stats		Grant Fuhr 32 saves / 34 shots

May 22	Edmonton Oilers	3–5	Philadelphia Flyers	Spectrum	Recap
Mark Messier (11) – sh – 04:14; Paul Coffey (3) – 19:51		First period	No scoring
Glenn Anderson (13) – pp – 01:49		Second period	09:04 – pp – Murray Craven (2); 15:20 – pp – Peter Zezel (3)
No scoring		Third period	04:37 – Scott Mellanby (5); 04:54 – Brad McCrimmon (2); 19:26 – Brian Propp (11)
Grant Fuhr 31 saves / 35 shots		Goalie stats	Ron Hextall 25 saves / 28 shots

May 24	Edmonton Oilers	4–1	Philadelphia Flyers	Spectrum	Recap
Jari Kurri (13) – 05:53; Kevin Lowe (1) – sh – 18:44		First period	No scoring
Randy Gregg (3) – pp – 12:31		Second period	08:17 – pp – Brad McCrimmon (3)
Mike Krushelnyski (3) – 04:17		Third period	No scoring
Grant Fuhr 27 saves / 28 shots		Goalie stats	Ron Hextall 25 saves / 29 shots

May 26	Philadelphia Flyers	4–3	Edmonton Oilers	Northlands Coliseum	Recap
Rick Tocchet (10) – 19:10		First period	02:58 – pp – Jari Kurri (14); 06:35 – Marty McSorley (3)
Doug Crossman (4) – 08:08; Pelle Eklund (7) – pp – 12:40		Second period	01:32 – Marty McSorley (4)
Rick Tocchet (11) – 05:26		Third period	No scoring
Ron Hextall 31 saves / 34 shots		Goalie stats	Grant Fuhr 31 saves / 35 shots

May 28	Edmonton Oilers	2–3	Philadelphia Flyers	Spectrum	Recap
Kevin Lowe (2) – sh – 05:02; Kevin McClelland (2) – 15:16		First period	No scoring
No scoring		Second period	07:12 – Lindsay Carson (3)
No scoring		Third period	13:04 – pp – Brian Propp (12); 14:28 – J. J. Daigneault (1)
Grant Fuhr 20 saves / 23 shots		Goalie stats	Ron Hextall 30 saves / 32 shots

May 31	Philadelphia Flyers	1–3	Edmonton Oilers	Northlands Coliseum	Recap
Murray Craven (3) – pp – 01:41		First period	07:45 – Mark Messier (12)
No scoring		Second period	14:59 – Jari Kurri (15)
No scoring		Third period	17:36 – Glenn Anderson (14)
Ron Hextall 40 saves / 43 shots		Goalie stats	Grant Fuhr 19 saves / 20 shots

Edmonton won series 4–3

== Player statistics ==
=== Skaters ===
These are the top ten skaters based on points.

Player	Team	GP	G	A	Pts	+/–	PIM
Wayne Gretzky	Edmonton Oilers	21	5	29	34	+10	6
Mark Messier	Edmonton Oilers	21	12	16	28	+13	16
Brian Propp	Philadelphia Flyers	26	12	16	28	+11	10
Glenn Anderson	Edmonton Oilers	21	14	13	27	+13	59
Pelle Eklund	Philadelphia Flyers	26	7	20	27	+11	2
Jari Kurri	Edmonton Oilers	21	15	10	25	+11	20
Mats Naslund	Montreal Canadiens	17	7	15	22	-1	11
Rick Tocchet	Philadelphia Flyers	26	11	10	21	+7	72
Larry Robinson	Montreal Canadiens	17	3	17	20	+4	6
Ryan Walter	Montreal Canadiens	17	7	12	19	+4	10

=== Goaltenders ===
This is a combined table of the top five goaltenders based on goals against average and the top five goaltenders based on save percentage, with at least 420 minutes played. The table is sorted by GAA, and the criteria for inclusion are bolded.

Player	Team	GP	W	L	SA	GA	GAA	SV%	SO	TOI
Glen Hanlon	Detroit Red Wings	8	5	2	227	13	**1.68**	**.943**	2	463:46
Ken Wregget	Toronto Maple Leafs	13	7	6	366	29	**2.29**	**.921**	1	758:17
Grant Fuhr	Edmonton Oilers	19	14	5	509	47	**2.47**	**.908**	0	1142:43
Kelly Hrudey	New York Islanders	14	7	7	462	38	**2.72**	**.918**	0	838:59
Brian Hayward	Montreal Canadiens	13	6	5	308	32	**2.74**	.896	0	701:58
Ron Hextall	Philadelphia Flyers	26	15	11	769	71	2.76	**.908**	0	1542:22

== See also ==
- 1986–87 NHL season
- List of Stanley Cup champions

== Notes ==
Preceded by 1986 Stanley Cup playoffs	Stanley Cup playoffs	Succeeded by 1988 Stanley Cup playoffs
