= Pelle Eklund =

Swedish ice hockey player

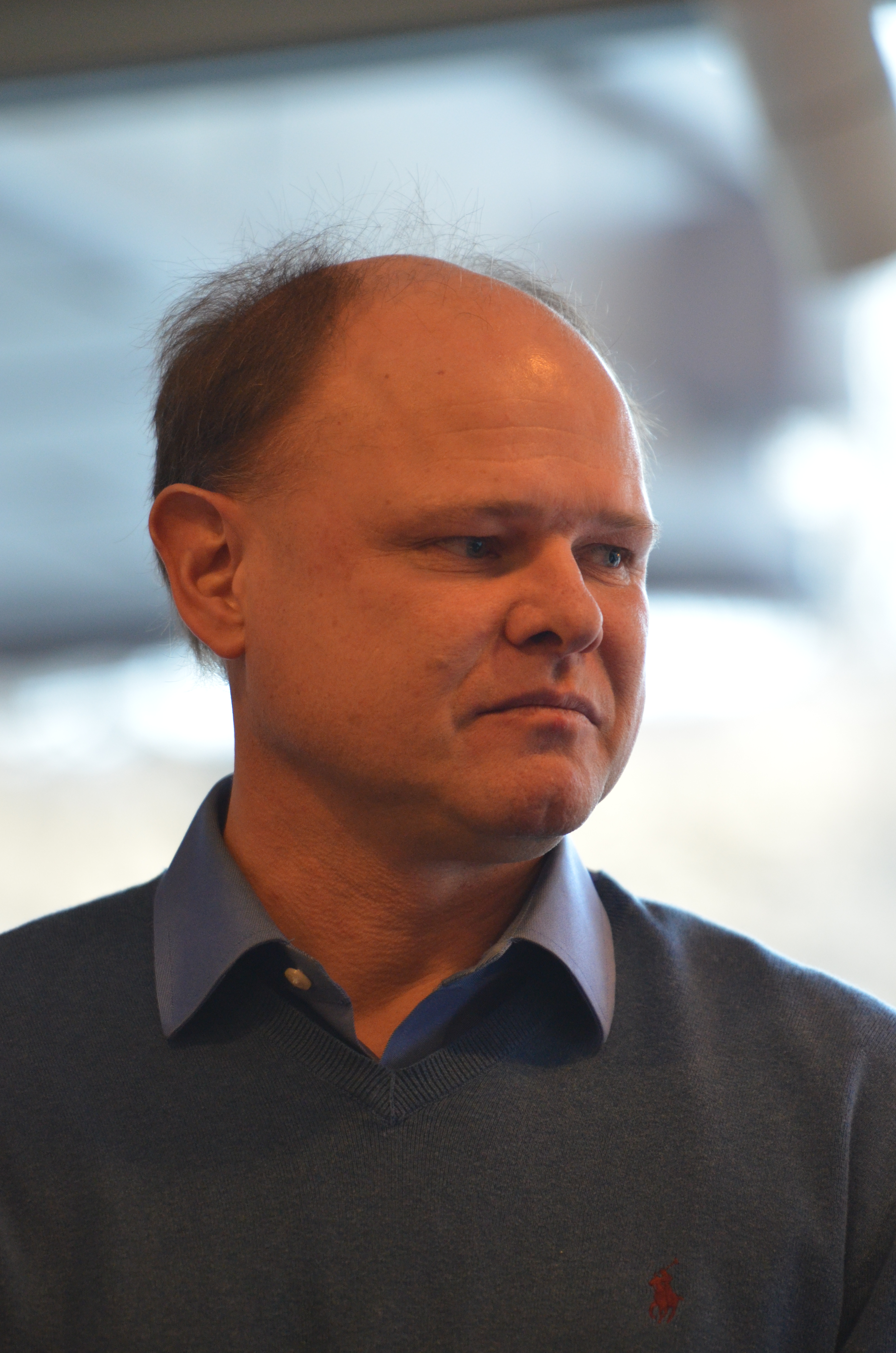
- Eklund in 2013
- Born: 22 March 1963 (age 63) Solna, Sweden
- Height: 5 ft 10 in (178 cm)
- Weight: 176 lb (80 kg; 12 st 8 lb)
- Position: Winger
- Shot: Left
- Played for: AIK; Leksands IF; Philadelphia Flyers; Dallas Stars
- National team: Sweden
- NHL draft: 161st overall, 1983; Philadelphia Flyers
- Playing career: 1981–1999

Per-Erik "Pelle" Eklund (born 22 March 1963) is a Swedish former professional ice hockey winger. He played nine seasons in the National Hockey League (NHL) with the Philadelphia Flyers and Dallas Stars from 1985 to 1994 and nine seasons in the Swedish Elitserien (SEL) with AIK and Leksands IF from 1981 to 1985 and 1994 to 1999. Internationally Eklund played for the Swedish national team at several World Championships, winning gold in 1991 and silver in both 1990 and 1995, and the 1984 Winter Olympics, winning a bronze medal.

== Playing career ==
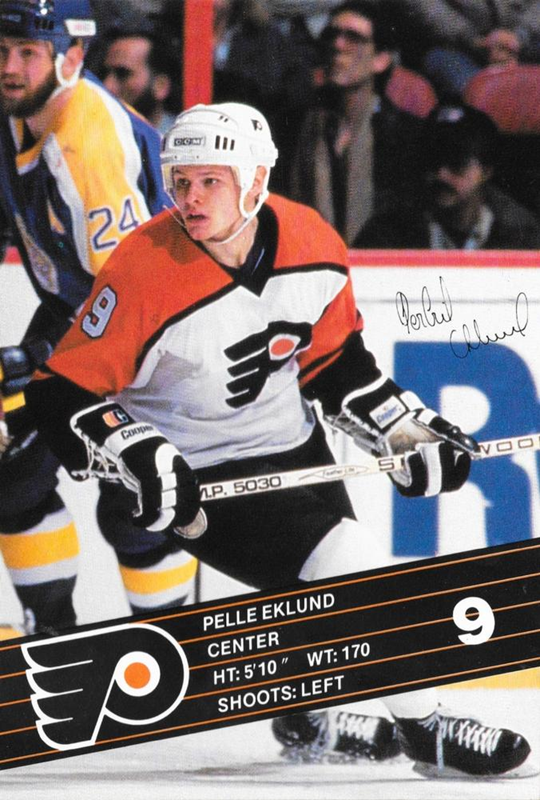
1986 postcard of Eklund for Philadelphia Flyers

Eklund played as a Bantam for Stocksund in team 63 where he was the captain of the team. Eklund played for AIK of the Elitserien between 1981 and 1985, winning the league championship in 1984. He won the Golden Puck as Sweden's top player in 1984 at the age of 21. He came to the NHL in 1985, joining the Philadelphia Flyers, who had selected him as the 161st overall pick in the 1983 NHL entry draft. He led all rookies in assists with 51 and finished third in overall rookie scoring (behind Kjell Dahlin and Gary Suter) in the 1985–86 season.

Over the next nine seasons, Eklund topped the 50-assist mark on three occasions. In the 1987 Stanley Cup playoffs, he helped carry Philadelphia to the 1987 Stanley Cup Final, as his 27 points were fourth in overall scoring and his 20 assists were second to only Wayne Gretzky; in his only Cup Final, he recorded seven assists in the series along with one goal, but the Flyers lost to the Edmonton Oilers in seven games. Eklund recorded only one goal and 18 points in 48 games for the Flyers during the 1993–94 season. At the trade deadline, he was dealt to the Dallas Stars, where he had a brief stint to finish his NHL career. Eklund then returned to Sweden to play for Leksands IF for the 1994–95 season. He led the SEL in assists and points and was named league MVP. He played four more seasons for Leksand before retiring in 1999 at the age of 36.

In the 2005–06 season, he served as an assistant coach for Leksand. He served as a scout for the Montreal Canadiens until he was fired on 31 May 2010. Currently he is an amateur scout with the Edmonton Oilers.

== International ==
Medal record

Representing Sweden

Olympics
Bronze medal – third place	1984 Sarajevo	

World Championships
Gold medal – first place	1991 Finland	
Silver medal – second place	1995 Sweden	
Silver medal – second place	1990 Switzerland	

European Junior Championships
Bronze medal – third place	1981 Soviet Union	

Eklund played 126 international games for the Swedish national team. He played in six World Championships and was on the gold medal Swedish team of 1991. He played in the 1984 Winter Olympics on the bronze medal team and in the 1984 Canada Cup, in which Sweden made the finals. He was also on the European Championships gold-medal team in 1990.

== Career statistics ==
=== Regular season and playoffs ===
			Regular season					Playoffs
Season	Team	League	GP	G	A	Pts	PIM	GP	G	A	Pts	PIM
1978–79	Stocksunds IF	SWE-3	1	2	0	2	—	—	—	—	—	—
1979–80	Stocksunds IF	SWE-3	17	8	2	10	—	—	—	—	—	—
1980–81	Stocksunds IF	SWE-3	19	13	20	33	—	—	—	—	—	—
1981–82	AIK	SWE	23	2	2	4	2	—	—	—	—	—
1982–83	AIK	SWE	34	13	17	30	14	3	1	4	5	2
1983–84	AIK	SWE	35	9	18	27	24	6	6	7	13	2
1984–85	AIK	SWE	35	16	33	49	10	—	—	—	—	—
1985–86	Philadelphia Flyers	NHL	70	15	51	66	12	5	0	2	2	0
1986–87	Philadelphia Flyers	NHL	72	14	41	55	2	26	7	20	27	2
1987–88	Philadelphia Flyers	NHL	71	10	32	42	12	7	0	3	0
1988–89	Philadelphia Flyers	NHL	79	18	51	69	23	19	3	8	11	2
1989–90	Philadelphia Flyers	NHL	70	23	39	62	16	—	—	—	—	—
1990–91	Philadelphia Flyers	NHL	73	19	50	69	14	—	—	—	—	—
1991–92	Philadelphia Flyers	NHL	51	7	16	23	4	—	—	—	—	—
1992–93	Philadelphia Flyers	NHL	55	11	38	49	16	—	—	—	—	—
1993–94	Philadelphia Flyers	NHL	48	1	16	17	8	—	—	—	—	—
1993–94	Dallas Stars	NHL	5	2	1	3	2	9	0	3	3	4
1994–95	Leksands IF	SWE	32	13	36	49	12	2	0	1	1	0
1995–96	Leksands IF	SWE	30	6	17	23	6	4	1	0	1	2
1996–97	Leksands IF	SWE	36	6	16	22	10	9	2	5	7	4
1997–98	Leksands IF	SWE	38	8	18	26	18	4	1	0	1	2
1998–99	Leksands IF	SWE	37	8	17	25	10	4	1	2	3	4
SWE totals			300	81	174	255	106	32	12	19	31	16
NHL totals			594	120	335	455	109	66	10	36	46	8

=== International ===
Year	Team	Event	GP	G	A	Pts	PIM
1981	Sweden	EJC	5	0	0	0	4
1982	Sweden	WJC	6	1	3	4	2
1983	Sweden	WJC	7	5	1	6	2
1984	Sweden	OLY	7	2	6	8	0
1984	Sweden	CC	8	1	1	2	0
1985	Sweden	WC	10	2	4	6	2
1986	Sweden	WC	4	1	1	2	4
1990	Sweden	WC	10	1	7	8	4
1991	Sweden	WC	10	1	3	4	2
1995	Sweden	WC	8	1	2	3	0
1996	Sweden	WC	6	0	3	3	4
Junior totals			18	6	4	10	8
Senior totals			63	9	27	36	16

== Awards ==
- Guldpucken Award (Golden Puck) as Sweden's player of the year in 1983–84
- Guldhjalmen Award (Golden Helmet) as the Most Valuable Player in the Elitserien in 1994–95
- 1984 Elitserien All-Star Team
- Top scorer in 1984 Elitserien playoffs

Preceded by Håkan Loob	Guldpucken; 1984	Succeeded by Anders Eldebrink
Preceded by Rick Tocchet	Winner of the Bobby Clarke Trophy; 1991	Succeeded by Rod Brind'Amour
