= 38th National Hockey League All-Star Game =

Professional ice hockey exhibition game

38th NHL All-Star Game
	1	2	3	OT	Total
Wales	0	1	2	1	4
Campbell	0	1	2	0	3
- Date: February 4, 1986
- Arena: Hartford Civic Center
- City: Hartford
- MVP: Grant Fuhr (Edmonton)
- Attendance: 15,100

The 38th National Hockey League All-Star Game was held in the Hartford Civic Center in Hartford, home to the Hartford Whalers, on February 4, 1986.

== Highlights ==
The Professional Hockey Writers' Association (PHWA) had annually chosen participants of the NHL All-Star Game prior to the league's fans voting for the starting players as of the 1986 All-Star Game. When the league's fans voted Pelle Lindbergh as a starting goaltender in the 1986 game despite his death a few months earlier, PHWA president Rod Beaton doubted that the PHWA would have been chosen Lindbergh since its members were not sentimental and took the choice seriously. Beaton felt that the fans "had voted with reasonable intelligence", and choosing Lindbergh "was a quality gesture", but was disappointed when a deserving player did not play because fans voted for a long-term star instead.

== Game summary ==
	Campbell Conference	Wales Conference
Final score	3	4 (OT)
Head coach	(Canada) Glen Sather (Edmonton Oilers)	(Canada) Mike Keenan (Philadelphia Flyers)
Honorary captain	(Canada) Phil Esposito	(Canada) Gordie Howe
Lineup	Starting lineup: (Canada) 7 - D Paul Coffey (Edmonton Oilers); (Canada) 24 - D Doug Wilson (Chicago Black Hawks), Alternate; (Finland) 17 - RW Jari Kurri (Edmonton Oilers); (Canada) 9 - LW Glenn Anderson (Edmonton Oilers); (Canada) 31 - G Grant Fuhr (Edmonton Oilers); (Canada) 99 - C Wayne Gretzky (Edmonton Oilers), Captain; Reserves: (United States) 2 - D Lee Fogolin (Edmonton Oilers); (Canada) 4 - D Kevin Lowe (Edmonton Oilers); (Canada) 5 - D Rob Ramage (St. Louis Blues); (Canada) 10 - C Dale Hawerchuk (Winnipeg Jets); (Canada) 11 - LW Mark Messier (Edmonton Oilers); (United States) 12 - C Neal Broten (Minnesota North Stars); (Canada) 14 - RW Tony Tanti (Vancouver Canucks); (Canada) 15 - LW Wendel Clark (Toronto Maple Leafs); (Canada) 18 - RW Dave Taylor (Los Angeles Kings), Alternate; (Canada) 19 - C Denis Savard (Chicago Black Hawks); (Canada) 20 - RW Mark Hunter (St. Louis Blues); (United States) 21 - D Gary Suter (Calgary Flames); (Canada) 25 - LW John Ogrodnick (Detroit Red Wings); (Canada) 35 - G Andy Moog (Edmonton Oilers)	Starting lineup: (United States) 5 - D Rod Langway (Washington Capitals); (Canada) 7 - D Ray Bourque (Boston Bruins); (Canada) 12 - RW Tim Kerr (Philadelphia Flyers); (Canada) 16 - LW Michel Goulet (Quebec Nordiques); (Canada) 66 - C Mario Lemieux (Pittsburgh Penguins); (Canada) 33 - G Mario Gosselin (Quebec Nordiques); Reserves: (United States) 2 - D Mark Howe (Philadelphia Flyers), Alternate; (United States) 6 - D Mike Ramsey (Buffalo Sabres); (Canada) 9 - C Kirk Muller (New Jersey Devils); (Canada) 11 - RW Mike Gartner (Washington Capitals); (Canada) 15 - LW Sylvain Turgeon (Hartford Whalers); (Canada) 19 - D Larry Robinson (Montreal Canadiens), Captain; (Canada) 20 - C Dave Poulin (Philadelphia Flyers); (Canada) 22 - RW Mike Bossy (New York Islanders); (Czechoslovakia) 25 - C Peter Stastny (Quebec Nordiques); (Canada) 26 - LW Brian Propp (Philadelphia Flyers); (Sweden) 27 - LW Mats Naslund (Montreal Canadiens); (Finland) 29 - D Reijo Ruotsalainen (New York Rangers); (Canada) 35 - G Bob Froese (Philadelphia Flyers); (United States) (Canada) 61 - C Bryan Trottier (New York Islanders), Alternate; (Sweden) 31 - G Pelle Lindbergh (Philadelphia Flyers) (Voted Posthumously)
Scoring summary	Tanti (unassisted) 7:56 2nd; Gretzky (Coffey, Savard) 17:09 3rd; Hawerchuk (Savard, Coffey) 19:17 3rd (pp)	Propp (Naslund, Bourque) 17:56 2nd; Stastny (Robinson, Turgeon) 4:45 3rd; Propp (Robinson) 17:38 3rd (pp); Trottier (Bossy) 3:05 OT (GWG)
Penalties	Suter, 8:51 1st; Lowe, 6:14 3rd; Messier, 16:31 3rd	Gartner, 12:55 1st; Turgeon, 15:22 3rd; Gartner, 18:45 3rd
Shots on goal	8–15–9–3–35	6–11–10–2–29
Win/loss	L - Andy Moog	W - Bob Froese

- Referee: Ron Wicks
- Linesmen: Gord Broseker, John D'Amico
- TV: TSN, ESPN
