= Dan Daoust =

Canadian former ice hockey forward

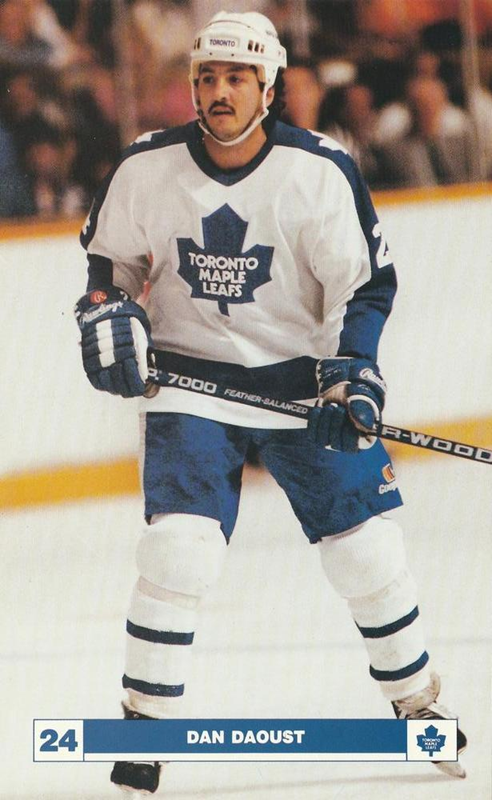
- Daoust in 1988 postcard
- Born: February 29, 1960 (age 66) Montreal, Quebec, Canada
- Height: 5 ft 11 in (180 cm)
- Weight: 165 lb (75 kg; 11 st 11 lb)
- Position: Centre
- Shot: Left
- Played for: Montreal Canadiens; Toronto Maple Leafs
- NHL draft: Undrafted
- Playing career: 1980–1997

Daniel Armand Daoust (/dæˈu/ Da-OO; born February 29, 1960) is a Canadian former professional ice hockey forward. All but four of his 522 career National Hockey League (NHL) games were spent as a member of the Toronto Maple Leafs. Daoust was born in Montreal, Quebec, but grew up in McGarry, Ontario.

== Playing career ==
Daoust began his NHL career with the Montreal Canadiens in 1982 after three successful junior seasons playing with the Cornwall Royals, where he scored over 40 goals twice, while recording 103 points in his final season in 1979–80, that included winning the Memorial Cup. Montreal, believing he was too small to succeed in the NHL, failed to give him much of an opportunity, and he was traded to the Toronto Maple Leafs on December 17, 1982 alongside Gaston Gingras in exchange for future considerations (later determined to be a third-round pick in the 1984 draft for Daoust, and a second-round pick in 1986 for Gingras).

Daoust was an immediate success in Toronto, scoring 51 points in 48 games in his first season there. Daoust relied on grit and hard work to compensate for his small stature and became a fan favorite in Toronto in the 1980s.

Daoust's point production declined dramatically from 1985-86 to 1989-90, and by 1990 his NHL career had come to a close. In late 1990, he joined the Swiss team HC Thurgau, and he was a successful player in Switzerland until 1996–97.

Daoust currently resides in Markham, Ontario with his wife Julie, daughters Josee and Melanie, and son Eric.

== Coaching ==
In April 2024, he coached the U-18 Markham Waxers hockey team into the Telus Cup tournament in Cape Breton Regional Municipality Nova Scotia, and losing to the eventual champions from Magog, Quebec both in tournament play and in the semi-finals, and missing the Bronze to the team from Calgary, Alberta in a shootout.

== Awards ==
- AHL First All-Star Team (1981)
- NHL All-Rookie Team (1983)

== Career statistics ==
			Regular season					Playoffs
Season	Team	League	GP	G	A	Pts	PIM	GP	G	A	Pts	PIM
1977–78	Cornwall Royals	QMJHL	68	24	44	68	74	2	1	2	3	7
1978–79	Cornwall Royals	QMJHL	72	42	55	97	85	7	2	4	6	29
1979–80	Cornwall Royals	QMJHL	70	40	62	102	82	18	5	9	14	36
1979–80	Cornwall Royals	MC	—	—	—	—	—	5	1	4	5	8
1980–81	Nova Scotia Voyageurs	AHL	80	38	60	98	106	6	1	3	4	10
1981–82	Nova Scotia Voyageurs	AHL	61	25	40	65	75	9	5	2	7	11
1982–83	Montreal Canadiens	NHL	4	0	1	1	4	—	—	—	—	—
1982–83	Toronto Maple Leafs	NHL	48	18	33	51	31	—	—	—	—	—
1983–84	Toronto Maple Leafs	NHL	78	18	56	74	88	—	—	—	—	—
1984–85	Toronto Maple Leafs	NHL	79	17	37	54	98	—	—	—	—	—
1985–86	Toronto Maple Leafs	NHL	80	7	13	20	88	10	2	2	4	19
1986–87	Toronto Maple Leafs	NHL	33	4	3	7	35	13	5	2	7	42
1987–88	Toronto Maple Leafs	NHL	67	9	8	17	57	4	0	0	0	2
1988–89	Toronto Maple Leafs	NHL	68	7	5	12	54	—	—	—	—	—
1989–90	Toronto Maple Leafs	NHL	65	7	11	18	89	5	0	1	1	20
1990–91	HC Ajoie	CHE.2	27	21	32	53	106	10	6	8	14	17
1991–92	EHC Biel-Bienne	NDA	5	5	9	14	8	—	—	—	—	—
1991–92	SC Lyss	CHE.2	25	24	16	40	58	9	3	6	9	44
1991–92	ESV Kaufbeuren	1.GBun	7	2	0	2	14	—	—	—	—	—
1992–93	HC Thurgau	CHE.2	36	23	31	54	123	—	—	—	—	—
1993–94	HC Thurgau	CHE.2	36	21	26	47	97	2	0	1	1	2
1994–95	HC Thurgau	CHE.2	36	23	42	65	105	6	7	5	12	41
1995–96	HC Thurgau	CHE.2	36	25	40	65	50	5	3	6	9	10
1996–97	HC Thurgau	CHE.2	19	10	24	34	20	3	1	1	2	8
NHL totals			522	87	167	254	544	32	7	5	12	83
CHE.2 totals			215	147	211	358	559	35	20	27	47	122
