= Clint Malarchuk =

Canadian ice hockey player (born 1961)

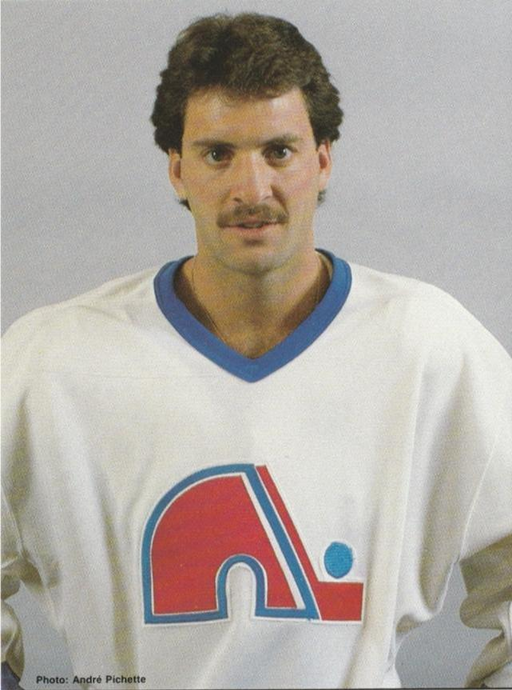
- Malarchuk in 1985 card
- Born: May 1, 1961 (age 65) Grande Prairie, Alberta, Canada
- Height: 6 ft 1 in (185 cm)
- Weight: 185 lb (84 kg; 13 st 3 lb)
- Position: Goaltender
- Caught: Left
- Played for: Quebec Nordiques; Washington Capitals; Buffalo Sabres
- NHL draft: 74th overall, 1981; Quebec Nordiques
- Playing career: 1981–1996

Clint Malarchuk (born May 1, 1961) is a Canadian former professional ice hockey goaltender who played in the National Hockey League (NHL) between 1981 and 1992. He has been a coach for four NHL teams and two minor league teams, most recently the Calgary Flames. He was born in Grande Prairie, Alberta, raised in Edmonton, Alberta, and lives in Alberta and Nevada.

Malarchuk is known for surviving a life-threatening injury during a 1989 NHL game when a player's skate made contact with his neck, slicing his carotid artery and partially slicing his jugular vein, causing immediate massive blood loss.

== Playing career ==
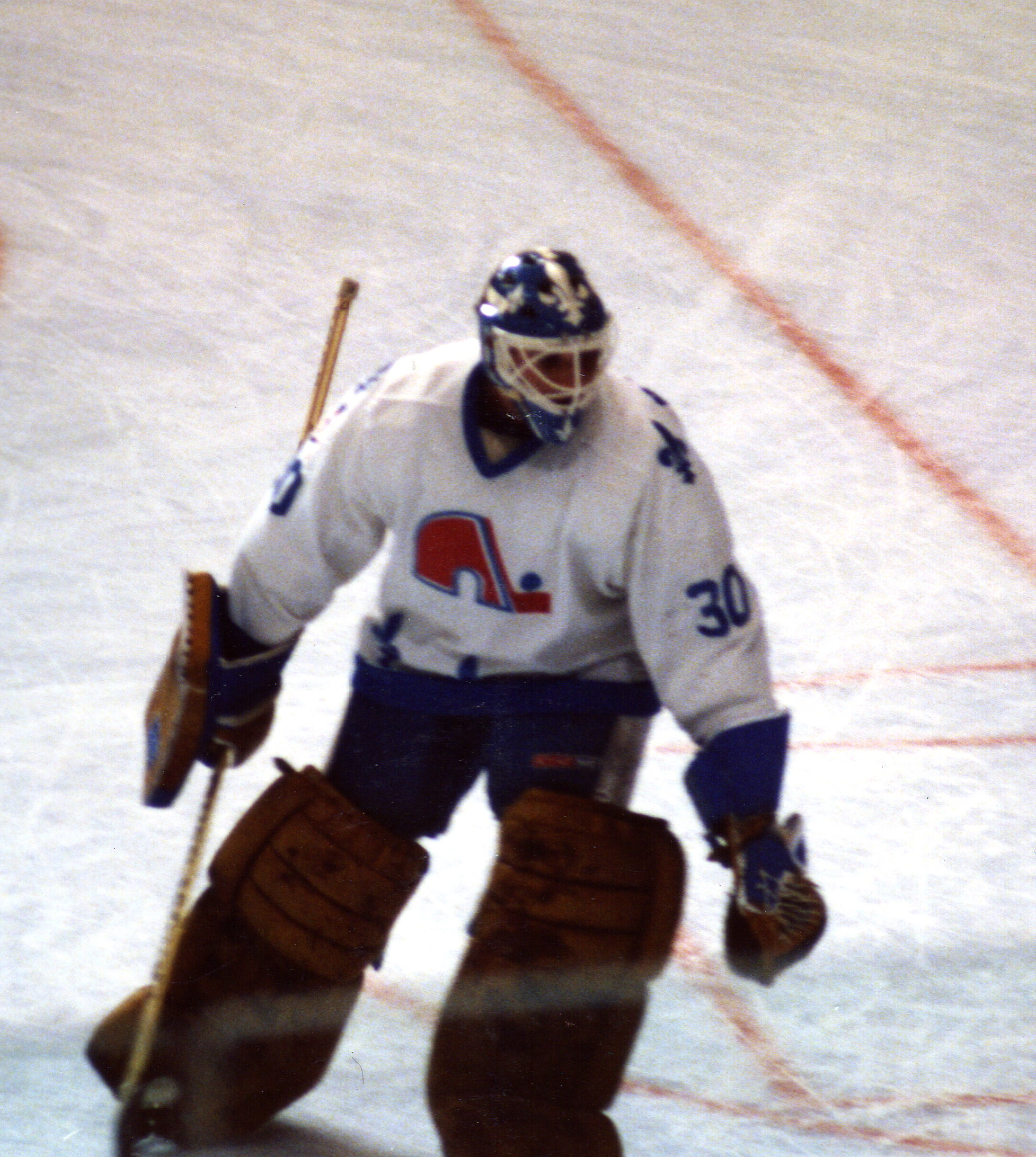
Malarchuk in action for Quebec Nordiques in 1986

=== Early career ===
Malarchuk played junior hockey for the Portland Winterhawks of the Western Hockey League (WHL). He then went on to play professionally in the National Hockey League (NHL) for the Quebec Nordiques, Washington Capitals, and Buffalo Sabres, and in the International Hockey League (IHL) for the San Diego Gulls and Las Vegas Thunder. He had a career record of 141 wins, 130 losses, 45 ties, 12 shutouts, and an .885 save percentage.

Malarchuk made his NHL debut with the Nordiques on December 13, 1981, getting the start in goal in a road game against the Buffalo Sabres. The Nordiques were dissatisfied with back-up goaltender Michel Plasse at the time and decided to give Malarchuk a look, in spite of his young age (he had just turned 20 a few months earlier). He did well enough in his first game, a 4–4 tie, but the second one, two days later, was a lot tougher, as he faced the defending Stanley Cup champions, the New York Islanders. The Nordiques favored a wide-open style of play at the time, and Malarchuk was left largely to his own devices and faced 37 shots, letting 10 goals past him, in a wild 10–7 loss, in what was the highest scoring game in the history of the Nassau Coliseum. Having failed his audition, he was returned to the American Hockey League after that game and did not come back until the following season. Quebec traded Plasse to the Hartford Whalers later that season in return for John Garrett, addressing the team's need for a reliable back-up goaltender for Dan Bouchard.

Malarchuk played sparingly in the NHL the next two seasons, then not at all in 1984–85, as he spent the majority of these three years with the Fredericton Express in the AHL. He became the Nordiques' primary goaltender in 1985–86, keeping the job for two seasons, although there was continual controversy over whether he or local favorite Mario Gosselin should be the starter. In a statistical quirk, during the 1984 NHL Playoffs, he was not credited with a game played but still was assessed with 15 penalty minutes. In Game 6 of the Adams Division Finals against the Montreal Canadiens on April 20, he was handed both a major penalty and a game misconduct for leaving his team's bench to take part in an on-ice brawl. He was traded to the Washington Capitals after the 1986–87 season alongside Dale Hunter in return for Gaétan Duchesne, Alan Haworth and a first-round choice in the 1987 NHL entry draft that eventually landed the Nordiques Joe Sakic, serving as the Capitals' starting goaltender for the next season-and-a-half. Then, on March 6, 1989, Malarchuk was traded to the Buffalo Sabres, along with Grant Ledyard and a 1991 sixth round pick (Brian Holzinger) in exchange for Calle Johansson and a 1989 second-round pick (Byron Dafoe). It was sixteen days later, in just his sixth game with the Sabres, that Malarchuk would suffer his notorious life-threatening neck injury.

=== Neck injury ===
During a game between the visiting St. Louis Blues and Malarchuk's Buffalo Sabres on March 22, 1989, Steve Tuttle of the Blues and Uwe Krupp of the Sabres crashed hard into the goal crease during play. As they collided, Tuttle's skate blade hit the right front side of Malarchuk's neck, severing his carotid artery and partially cutting his jugular vein.

With blood gushing out of Malarchuk's neck onto the ice, he was able to leave the ice on his own feet with the assistance of his team's athletic trainer, Jim Pizzutelli. Many spectators were physically sickened by the sight. It was reported that the excessive amount of blood that Malarchuk lost caused eleven fans to faint, two more to have heart attacks, and three players to vomit on the ice. Local television cameras covering the game cut away from the sight of Malarchuk bleeding after noticing what had happened, and Sabres announcers Ted Darling and Mike Robitaille were audibly shaken. At the production room of the national cable sports highlight show, a producer scrolled his tape back to show the event to two other producers, who were both horrified by the sight.

Malarchuk, meanwhile, believed that he was going to die. "All I wanted to do was get off the ice", said Malarchuk. "My mother was watching the game on TV, and I didn't want her to see me die." Aware that his mother had been watching the game on TV, he had an equipment manager call and tell her he loved her. Then he asked for a priest.

Malarchuk's life was saved due to quick action by the Sabres' athletic trainer, Jim Pizzutelli, a former US Army combat medic who had served in the Vietnam War. He gripped Malarchuk's neck and applied extreme pressure to stop the bleeding, not letting go until emergency medical personnel arrived to begin stabilizing the wound. Malarchuk was conscious and talking on the way to the hospital, and jokingly asked paramedics if they could bring him back in time for the third period. The game resumed when league personnel received word that Malarchuk was in stable condition.

When Malarchuk arrived at the hospital, emergency room personnel were waiting. Nurses cut his clothes off and prepped him for emergency surgery. It took doctors a total of 300 stitches to close the 6-inch (15 cm) wound. Malarchuk lost 1.5 litres (0.33 imp gal; 0.40 US gal) of blood from the injury. He was back on the ice in ten days.

On February 10, 2008, coincidentally again in Buffalo, Florida Panthers forward Richard Zedník suffered an injury similar to Malarchuk's after Olli Jokinen's skate blade cut the front of Zedník's neck, lacerating his common carotid artery, causing immediate massive blood loss. Although Malarchuk initially refused to view the footage of Zedník's injury, upon viewing it, he was taken aback, saying that he did not think his memory of his own incident would come back after nearly 20 years. He sought treatment for post-traumatic stress disorder the following year.

=== Later career ===
Malarchuk's performance declined over the next few years until he decided to leave the National Hockey League. After this, he struggled with obsessive-compulsive disorder (as he had since a young age), as well as nightmares and alcoholism, but he remained in pro hockey in the International Hockey League. In 1992–93, Malarchuk was a goaltender for the IHL's San Diego Gulls and played in the league championship. The following season he became starting goaltender for the Las Vegas Thunder, appearing in 56 games and accumulating a record of 34–10–7. His jersey number was retired by the Thunder and hangs from the rafters of the Thomas & Mack Center.

== Coaching career ==
After retiring as a player, Malarchuk continued his career in ice hockey as a coach. Malarchuk served as head coach and assistant general manager of the Las Vegas Thunder in the 1998–99 season and the Idaho Steelheads until 2000. Afterwards he was a goaltending coach for the NHL Florida Panthers during the 2002–03 season. He was signed as the goaltending coach for 2006–07 by the Columbus Blue Jackets. In August 2010 Malarchuk agreed to become the goaltending consultant for the Atlanta Thrashers. On June 17, 2011, Calgary Flames announced hiring Malarchuk as their goaltender coach. On June 17, 2014, the Calgary Flames announced they parted ways with Malarchuk and were searching for a new goaltending coach. He had earlier taken leave during the 2013–14 season to enter the National Hockey League's substance abuse treatment program.

== Personal life ==
Clint's grandfather, Leonard Henning, was a competitive speed skater who became influential in developing young hockey players after moving to Grande Prairie in 1928. Malarchuk is of Ukrainian Canadian descent.

After his playing career, Malarchuk settled on a ranch near Carson City, Nevada (later Gardnerville, Nevada), where he and his wife at the time raised three kids. In mid-2000, he became certified as a veterinary technician and runs a practice as a horse dentist from his ranch. A visiting photographer once had his camera flash stolen by Malarchuk's emus.

Malarchuk's nickname in hockey was "the Cowboy Goalie" because he was active in the Calgary, Alberta-area rodeo scene during the hockey off-season. He was depicted riding bareback in a front-page newspaper photo while playing for the Washington Capitals, and he was later given horses as a contractual bonus with the Las Vegas Thunder. He also credited his cowboy upbringing for his toughness when returning to play for the Buffalo Sabres.

Malarchuk released an autobiography called The Crazy Game in November 2014. In the United States the book was published with the title A Matter of Inches—How I Survived in the Crease and Beyond. The book appeared on the Toronto Star bestsellers list through January 2015, and was made into a documentary film.

Following its release, Clint and Joanie Malarchuk were public speakers about topics covered in the book such as obsessive-compulsive disorder, support for alcoholics in recovery, suicide prevention, and psychological trauma. On May 7, 2015, Malarchuk was a guest speaker at a Canadian Mental Health Association meeting in Oakville, Ontario. On August 1, 2015, Clint and Joan Malarchuk were keynote speakers at the International OCD Foundation conference in Boston, Massachusetts. They showed the video footage of his sports injury to the audience with the advice that it is potentially triggering to people who are uncomfortable with images of blood and trauma. Malarchuk and his wife now travel and engage in a number of league-related and independent events having to do with mental health, OCD, and depression in retired athletes.

=== Suicide attempt ===
On October 7, 2008, Malarchuk suffered what, according to his wife Joan, was a self-inflicted gunshot wound to his chin from a .22 caliber rifle at his residence in Fish Springs, Nevada, after a period of stress and domestic problems. The incident was initially described as an accident while hunting rabbits, but both Malarchuk and his wife have since admitted it was a suicide attempt. On October 10, 2008, The Douglas County, Nevada sheriff's investigation concluded the shooting was accidental under suspicious circumstances, but afterward Joan Malarchuk said she unequivocally told the sheriff it was a suicide attempt "so that he would get the help he needed".

Officers and paramedics at the scene reported that Malarchuk, who was bleeding from both his mouth and chin, was uncooperative and refused treatment. Joan Malarchuk said she sat with her husband and comforted him because she was afraid he would lash out again and get shot by police. Malarchuk was later flown to Renown Regional Medical Center in Reno for treatment and released less than a week after the shooting. He then spent approximately six months in a rehab hospital being treated for alcoholism, OCD and PTSD.

The Canadian Press reported that Joan Malarchuk informed authorities that her husband was not supposed to consume alcohol as he was on prescription medications for obsessive-compulsive disorder, but was doing so anyway at the time of the shooting. Malarchuk later said he believed he was overmedicated dating back to when he was prescribed an anti-psychotic sedative while playing pro hockey in San Diego.

== Career statistics ==
=== Regular season and playoffs ===
			Regular season									Playoffs
Season	Team	League	GP	W	L	T	MIN	GA	SO	GAA	SV%	GP	W	L	MIN	GA	SO	GAA	SV%
1977–78	Fort Saskatchewan Traders	AJHL	33	23	9	1	2015	157	1	4.67	—	—	—	—	—	—	—	—	—
1978–79	Fort Saskatchewan Traders	AJHL	52	36	15	1	3030	204	1	4.04	—	—	—	—	—	—	—	—	—
1978–79	Portland Winter Hawks	WHL	2	2	0	0	120	4	0	2.00	—	—	—	—	—	—	—	—	—
1979–80	Portland Winter Hawks	WHL	37	21	10	0	1948	147	0	4.53	.875	1	0	0	40	3	0	4.50	—
1980–81	Portland Winter Hawks	WHL	38	28	8	0	2235	142	3	3.81	.893	5	3	2	307	21	0	4.10	—
1981–82	Quebec Nordiques	NHL	2	0	1	1	120	14	0	7.00	.788	—	—	—	—	—	—	—	—
1981–82	Fredericton Express	AHL	51	15	34	2	2906	247	0	5.10	—	—	—	—	—	—	—	—	—
1982–83	Quebec Nordiques	NHL	15	8	5	2	900	71	0	4.63	.863	—	—	—	—	—	—	—	—
1982–83	Fredericton Express	AHL	25	14	6	5	1506	78	0	3.11	.905	—	—	—	—	—	—	—	—
1983–84	Quebec Nordiques	NHL	23	10	9	2	1215	80	0	3.95	.865	—	—	—	—	—	—	—	—
1983–84	Fredericton Express	AHL	11	5	5	1	663	40	0	3.62	.894	—	—	—	—	—	—	—	—
1984–85	Fredericton Express	AHL	56	26	25	4	3347	198	2	3.55	.885	6	2	4	379	20	0	3.17	—
1985–86	Quebec Nordiques	NHL	46	26	12	4	2657	142	4	3.21	.895	3	0	2	143	11	0	4.62	.864
1986–87	Quebec Nordiques	NHL	54	18	26	9	3092	175	1	3.40	.884	3	0	2	140	8	0	3.43	.857
1987–88	Washington Capitals	NHL	54	24	20	4	2924	154	4	3.16	.885	4	0	2	193	15	0	4.65	.842
1988–89	Washington Capitals	NHL	42	16	18	7	2428	141	1	3.48	.877	—	—	—	—	—	—	—	—
1988–89	Buffalo Sabres	NHL	7	3	1	1	326	13	1	2.39	.908	1	0	1	59	5	0	5.07	.844
1989–90	Buffalo Sabres	NHL	29	14	11	2	1596	89	0	3.35	.903	—	—	—	—	—	—	—	—
1990–91	Buffalo Sabres	NHL	37	12	14	10	2131	119	1	3.35	.891	4	2	2	246	17	0	4.15	.853
1991–92	Buffalo Sabres	NHL	29	10	13	3	1639	102	0	3.73	.887	—	—	—	—	—	—	—	—
1991–92	Rochester Americans	AHL	2	2	0	0	120	3	1	1.50	.947	—	—	—	—	—	—	—	—
1992–93	San Diego Gulls	IHL	27	17	3	3	1516	72	3	2.85	.891	12	6	4	668	34	0	3.05	—
1993–94	Las Vegas Thunder	IHL	55	34	10	7	3076	172	1	3.35	.892	5	1	3	257	16	0	3.74	—
1994–95	Las Vegas Thunder	IHL	38	15	13	3	2039	127	0	3.74	.883	2	0	0	32	2	0	3.70	—
1995–96	Las Vegas Thunder	IHL	1	0	0	0	4	0	0	0.00	1.000	—	—	—	—	—	—	—	—
1996–97	Las Vegas Thunder	IHL	3	1	1	0	63	6	0	5.63	.833	—	—	—	—	—	—	—	—
NHL totals			338	141	130	45	19,028	1100	12	3.47	.885	15	2	9	782	56	0	4.30	.853

== See also ==
- Exsanguination
- Richard Zedník, hockey player who had a neck artery severed in an in-game accident in 2008
- Adam Johnson, hockey player who died from a similar in-game accident in 2023
