= Brian Mullen =

American ice hockey player (born 1962)

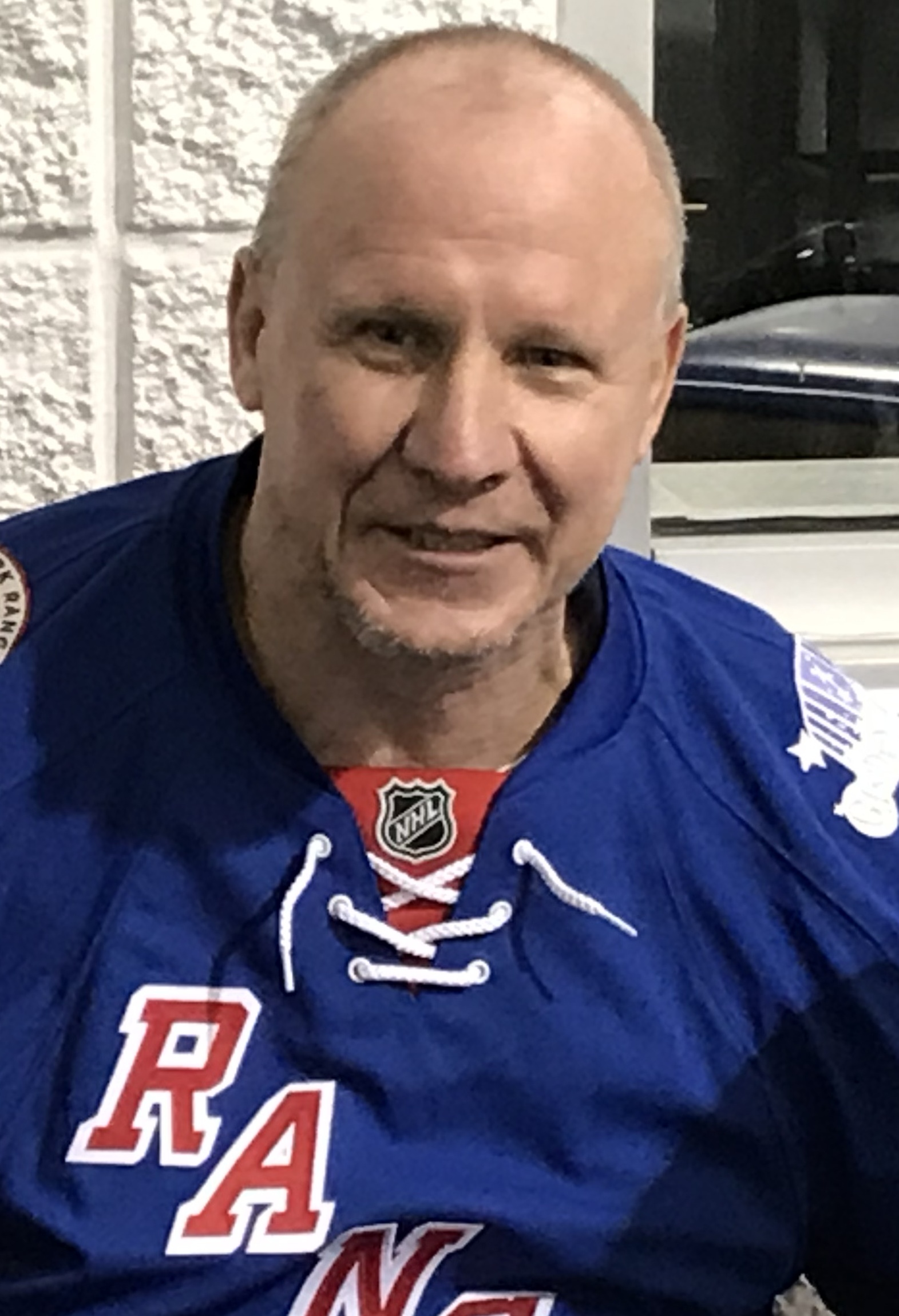
- Brian Mullen on November 30, 2019
- Born: March 16, 1962 (age 64) New York City, U.S.
- Height: 5 ft 10 in (178 cm)
- Weight: 180 lb (82 kg; 12 st 12 lb)
- Position: Left wing
- Shot: Left
- Played for: Winnipeg Jets; New York Rangers; San Jose Sharks; New York Islanders
- National team: United States
- NHL draft: 128th overall, 1980; Winnipeg Jets
- Playing career: 1982–1993

Brian Patrick Mullen (born March 16, 1962) is an American former professional ice hockey player who spent eleven seasons in the National Hockey League (NHL) playing for the Winnipeg Jets, New York Rangers, San Jose Sharks, and New York Islanders. Mullen appeared in 832 career NHL games, recording 260 goals and 622 points, along with 30 playoff points in 62 postseason games.

== Amateur career ==
Mullen grew up in an Irish-American family in the Hell's Kitchen neighborhood of Manhattan, New York. He and older brother Joe Mullen played roller hockey in the streets of Manhattan as children. After landing a job as a stick boy for the New York Rangers, he and Joe were offered a spot on a junior league team coached by Ranger head coach Emile Francis.

Mullen won an athletic scholarship to the University of Wisconsin–Madison where he played under legendary college hockey coach "Badger" Bob Johnson.

== Professional career ==
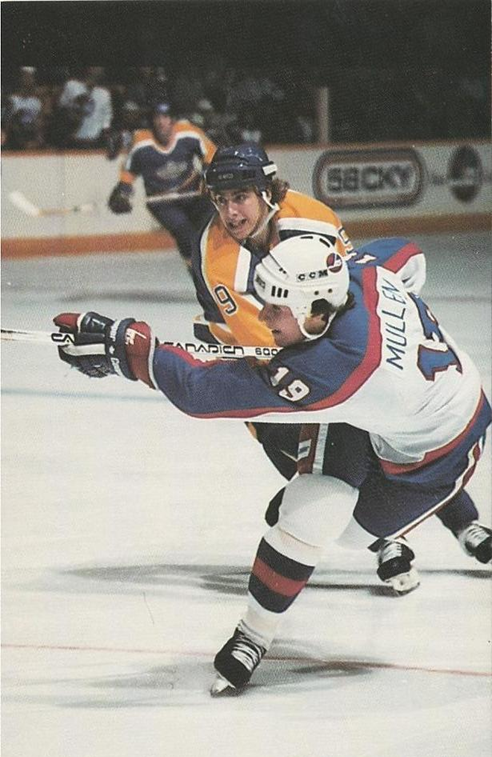
1983 photo of Mullen in action for Winnipeg Jets versus Los Angeles Kings

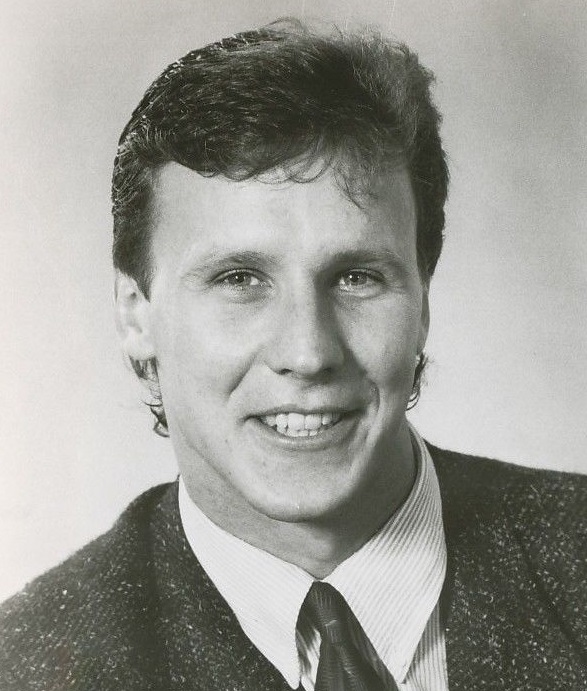
Brian Mullen in 1988.

Mullen was selected in the seventh round of the 1980 NHL entry draft by the Winnipeg Jets. Two years later, he signed with the Jets and scored an impressive 24 goals and recorded 50 points during his rookie season. He spent five seasons with Winnipeg before joining his hometown New York Rangers where he spent four seasons. Mullen also represented the United States in the 1989 and 1991 Ice Hockey World Championship tournaments after the Rangers were knocked out in the first round of the Stanley Cup playoffs (he was also a member of the 1984 Canada Cup team). Mullen spent the 1991–1992 season with the Sharks and the following season with the Islanders.

On August 9, 1993, Mullen suffered a small stroke caused by a blood clot in his brain. The stroke severely impacted his motor skills and he required open heart surgery. Mullen was recovering well and his reflexes largely returned to normal. He hoped to one day return to action in the NHL but a subsequent seizure in 1994 ended his dreams of a comeback and he was forced to retire from hockey.

== Post career ==
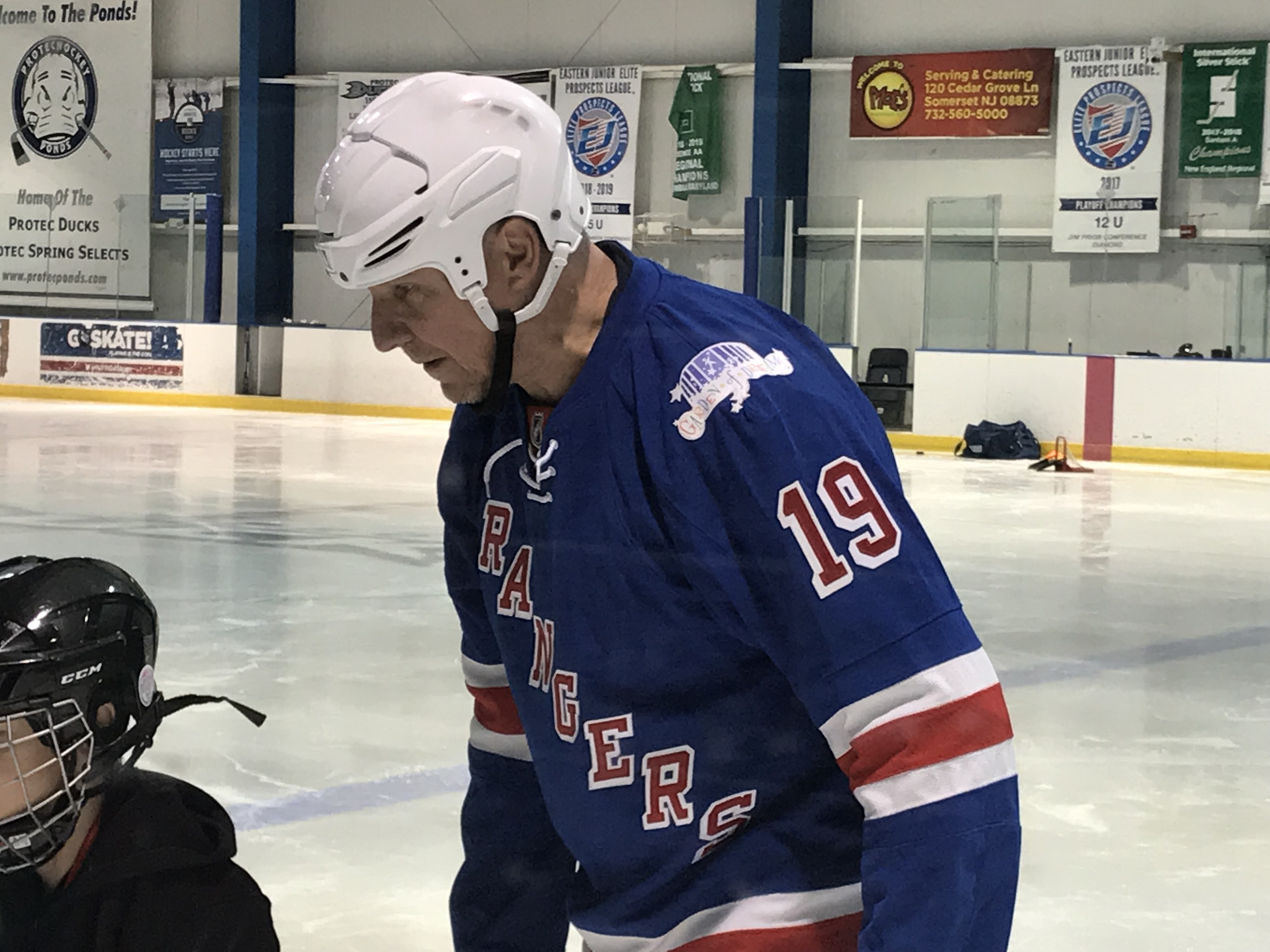
Brian Mullen at a Junior Rangers hockey program at the Protec Ponds Training Center in Somerset, New Jersey on November 30, 2019.

After his retirement, he worked for the NHL front office for eight years. He also worked as a radio color analyst for the New York Rangers alongside play-by-play announcer Kenny Albert for the 2002-2003 and 2003–2004 seasons. He is currently a youth hockey coach with the Protec Ducks of the New Jersey Youth Hockey League (NJYHL) who skate out of Protec Hockey Ponds in Somerset, New Jersey.

== Awards and accomplishments ==
- Played in NHL All-Star Game (1989)
- Lester Patrick Trophy (1995)
- In the 2009 book 100 Ranger Greats, was ranked No. 89 all-time of the 901 New York Rangers who had played during the team's first 82 seasons

== Career statistics ==
=== Regular season and playoffs ===
			Regular season					Playoffs
Season	Team	League	GP	G	A	Pts	PIM	GP	G	A	Pts	PIM
1977–78	New York Westsiders	NYJHL	33	21	36	57	38	—	—	—	—	—
1978–79	New York Jr. Rangers	NYJHL	36	47	45	92	—	—	—	—	—	—
1979–80	New Jersey Rockets	NYJHL	23	45	31	76	—	—	—	—	—	—
1980–81	University of Wisconsin	WCHA	38	11	13	24	28	—	—	—	—	—
1981–82	University of Wisconsin	WCHA	33	20	17	37	10	—	—	—	—	—
1982–83	Winnipeg Jets	NHL	80	24	26	50	14	3	1	0	1	0
1983–84	Winnipeg Jets	NHL	75	21	41	62	28	3	0	3	3	6
1984–85	Winnipeg Jets	NHL	69	32	39	71	32	8	1	2	3	4
1985–86	Winnipeg Jets	NHL	79	28	34	62	38	3	1	2	3	6
1986–87	Winnipeg Jets	NHL	69	19	32	51	20	9	4	2	6	0
1987–88	New York Rangers	NHL	74	25	29	54	42	—	—	—	—	—
1988–89	New York Rangers	NHL	78	29	35	64	60	3	0	1	1	4
1989–90	New York Rangers	NHL	76	27	41	68	42	10	2	2	4	8
1990–91	New York Rangers	NHL	79	19	43	62	44	5	0	2	2	0
1991–92	San Jose Sharks	NHL	72	18	28	46	66	—	—	—	—	—
1992–93	New York Islanders	NHL	81	18	14	32	28	18	3	4	7	2
NHL totals			832	260	362	622	414	62	12	18	30	30

=== International ===
Year	Team	Event	GP	G	A	Pts	PIM
1980	United States	WJC	5	2	3	5	0
1981	United States	WJC	5	0	2	2	6
1984	United States	CC	4	0	0	0	0
1989	United States	WC	10	2	3	5	4
1991	United States	WC	10	4	4	8	6
Junior totals			10	2	5	7	6
Senior totals			24	6	7	13	10
