= Derrick Smith (ice hockey) =

Canadian ice hockey player (born 1965)

- Born: January 22, 1965 (age 60); Scarborough, Ontario, Canada
- Height: 6 ft 2 in (188 cm)
- Weight: 210 lb (95 kg; 15 st 0 lb)
- Position: Centre
- Shot: Left
- Played for: Philadelphia Flyers; Minnesota North Stars; Dallas Stars
- NHL draft: 44th overall, 1983; Philadelphia Flyers
- Playing career: 1984–1999

Derrick Smith (born January 22, 1965) is a Canadian former professional ice hockey centre who played ten seasons in the National Hockey League (NHL) with the Philadelphia Flyers, Minnesota North Stars and Dallas Stars. As a youth, he played in the 1978 Quebec International Pee-Wee Hockey Tournament with the Toronto Young Nationals minor ice hockey team.

== Career ==
Smith was born and raised in the Toronto suburb of Scarborough, Ontario. He played junior hockey for Scarborough's Wexford Raiders, then joined the Peterborough Petes of the major junior Ontario Hockey League.

He was drafted by the Philadelphia Flyers in the 1983 NHL Entry Draft. He debuted as a professional with Philadelphia in 1984. He played seven seasons with Philadelphia before joining the Minnesota North Stars as a free agent in 1991. He would play 34 games in the NHL for the Stars organization, finishing his career in the minors in 1999.

=== Career statistics ===
			Regular season					Playoffs
Season	Team	League	GP	G	A	Pts	PIM	GP	G	A	Pts	PIM
1981–82	Wexford Raiders	OPJHL	45	35	47	82	40	—	—	—	—	—
1982–83	Peterborough Petes	OHL	70	16	19	35	47	—	—	—	—	—
1983–84	Peterborough Petes	OHL	70	30	36	66	31	8	4	4	8	7
1984–85	Philadelphia Flyers	NHL	77	17	22	39	31	19	2	5	7	16
1985–86	Philadelphia Flyers	NHL	69	6	6	12	57	4	0	0	0	10
1986–87	Philadelphia Flyers	NHL	71	11	21	32	34	26	6	4	10	26
1987–88	Philadelphia Flyers	NHL	76	16	8	24	104	7	0	0	0	6
1988–89	Philadelphia Flyers	NHL	74	16	14	30	43	19	5	2	7	12
1989–90	Philadelphia Flyers	NHL	55	3	6	9	32	—	—	—	—	—
1990–91	Philadelphia Flyers	NHL	72	11	10	21	37	—	—	—	—	—
1991–92	Minnesota North Stars	NHL	33	2	4	6	33	7	1	0	1	9
1991–92	Kalamazoo Wings	IHL	6	1	5	6	4	—	—	—	—	—
1992–93	Minnesota North Stars	NHL	9	0	1	1	2	—	—	—	—	—
1992–93	Kalamazoo Wings	IHL	52	22	13	35	43	—	—	—	—	—
1993–94	Dallas Stars	NHL	1	0	0	0	0	—	—	—	—	—
1993–94	Kalamazoo Wings	IHL	77	44	37	81	90	5	0	0	0	18
1994–95	Kalamazoo Wings	IHL	68	30	21	51	103	16	3	8	11	8
1995–96	Michigan K-Wings	IHL	69	15	26	41	79	10	4	3	7	16
1996–97	Michigan K-Wings	IHL	68	8	21	29	55	4	1	0	1	16
1997–98	Michigan K-Wings	IHL	64	15	26	41	39	4	1	1	2	2
1998–99	Baton Rouge Kingfish	ECHL	6	3	7	10	9	6	0	0	0	0
IHL totals			404	135	149	284	413	39	9	12	21	60
NHL totals			537	82	92	174	373	82	14	11	25	79
