= Bob Froese =

Canadian ice hockey player (born 1958)

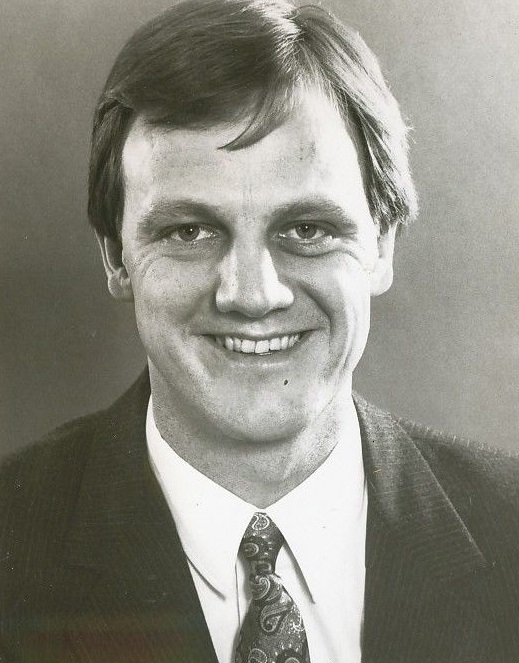
- Froese in 1986
- Born: June 30, 1958 (age 68) St. Catharines, Ontario, Canada
- Height: 5 ft 11 in (180 cm)
- Weight: 175 lb (79 kg; 12 st 7 lb)
- Position: Goaltender
- Caught: Left
- Played for: Philadelphia Flyers; New York Rangers
- National team: Canada
- NHL draft: 160th overall, 1978; St. Louis Blues
- Playing career: 1979–1990

Dr. Robert Glenn Froese (born June 30, 1958) is a Canadian former professional ice hockey goaltender who played eight seasons in the National Hockey League (NHL) for the Philadelphia Flyers and New York Rangers.

== Early life ==
Froese was born in St. Catharines, Ontario, Canada. He was the middle child to Frank and Agnes Froese with sisters Dorothy (elder) and Patti (younger).

== Playing career ==
=== Junior and minor leagues ===
At 16 Froese made his Ontario Major Junior Hockey League debut for his hometown St. Catharines Blackhawks, having been protected as a homegrown player instead of entering the OMJHL draft. His rookie campaign he played in 15 games. Bob played all four of his junior years for the Emms family, moving across the Niagara Region to the Niagara Falls Flyers for the latter two. Following the 1977–78 season, Froese was drafted by the St Louis Blues in the 10th round, 160th overall.

Due to the Blue's financial woes, Froese was not offered a contract out of junior, but instead signed for the Saginaw Gears of the International Hockey League. Halfway through his rookie IHL campaign, Froese was loaned to the Milwaukee Admirals, where he led them to a playoff berth. Froese played a total of three seasons in Saginaw, culminating with the 1980–81 Turner Cup.

1981–82 saw Froese sign with the Philadelphia Flyers, who placed him with the Maine Mariners. Froese played 33 AHL games for the Mariners in each of the 1981–82 and 1982–83 seasons. His call-up to the NHL came after Pelle Lindbergh injured his wrist in an exhibition game against a travelling Soviet exhibition team.

=== Philadelphia Flyers ===
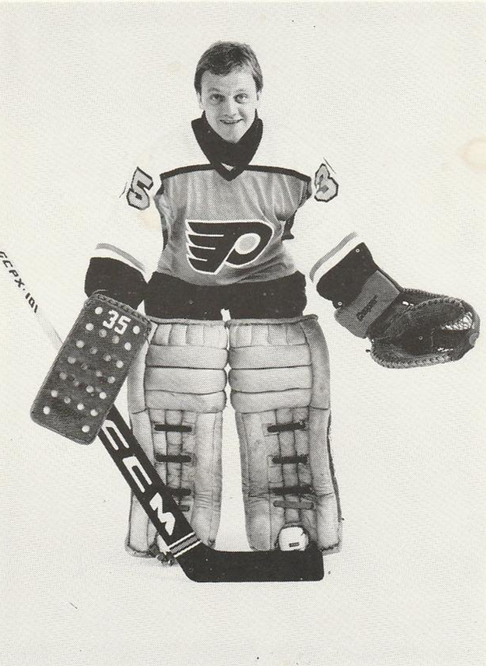
Froese with the Philadelphia Flyers in 1983

Froese made his NHL debut on January 8, 1983, against the Hartford Whalers. The Flyers won 7–4. Froese went on to win his first 8 NHL starts and go undefeated for his first 13, compiling a 12–0–1 record along the way. These were both records for a rookie goaltender at the time. His first NHL shutout came in his third game against the New York Rangers.

The 1983–84 season saw Froese lead the Flyers in games played. 1984–85 saw injuries limit Froese to 17 NHL games along with 4 AHL games for the Hershey Bears. In the 1984–85 playoffs, Froese made 1 start and came in 3 times in relief as the Flyers went to the Stanley Cup finals.

After Pelle Lindbergh died early in the 1985–86 season, Froese became the Flyers' starting goalie. Froese was selected as the Wales Conference backup goaltender for the 1986 All-Star Game, leading the Wales Conference to an overtime victory. At the close of this season he shared the William M. Jennings Trophy (for backstopping the team that gave up the fewest goals) with Darren Jensen. Froese also came second in Vezina Trophy voting to John Vanbiesbrouck by only two votes. During this season he led the NHL in save % (.909), shutouts (5), wins (31) and was named to the NHL Second All-Star Team.

1986–87 saw Froese lose the starting job for the Flyers to Ron Hextall. After appearing in only 3 games for the Flyers that season, he was traded to the New York Rangers on December 19, 1986, for Kjell Samuelsson and a second-round draft pick.

=== New York Rangers ===
Following his trade to the Rangers, Froese became half of one of the best tandems in the NHL along with the man he lost the Vezina Trophy to the year before, John Vanbiesbrouck. Appearing in only 28 games that season for the Rangers, he set the team record for most penalty minutes in a season, with 56. Following the season and the Rangers' early exit from the playoffs, Froese went to the IIHF World Championships in Vienna, Austria, where he shut out the Soviet Union during a 0–0 tie.

On November 29, 1987, Froese briefly became the second NHL goalie to score a goal in a game. An errant pass by the New York Islanders' Brent Sutter slid the length of the ice and into the Islanders' empty net on a delayed penalty call. Froese, who had appeared to make a save seconds earlier, was given credit for the goal. Later reviews showed that the shot had actually hit the post and not Froese, so the goal was given to David Shaw.

Altogether, he played for a total of eight seasons, appearing in 242 games and winning 128.

== Coaching career ==
Following his career, Froese joined the New York Rangers coaching staff as their goaltending consultant, working primarily with young prospects Mike Richter and Corey Hirsch. Following two years on the Rangers staff, he joined the New York Islanders in the same role. After three years on the Islanders staff, Froese stepped away from hockey to pursue ministry full-time.

== Post-hockey career ==
The death of Froese's teammate Pelle Lindbergh left Froese asking himself if he was ready to pass on, which led him to study religion. After leaving hockey, Froese earned an M.A. in Pastoral Counseling, followed by a Ph.D. in Biblical Counseling. He became the senior pastor of the Faith Fellowship Church in New York State, remaining for 24 years. He also served as the director of the National Biblical Counseling Association. Froese is now retired from both positions.

== Personal life ==
Froese married his high school sweetheart Ruth, c. 1977. Ruth earned a bachelor's in psychology, followed by a Master's in Biblical Counseling, and works as a Biblical Counselor.

The couple has four sons, two daughters-in-law, and a grand-daughter.

== Career statistics ==
=== Regular season and playoffs ===
			Regular season									Playoffs
Season	Team	League	GP	W	L	T	MIN	GA	SO	GAA	SV%	GP	W	L	MIN	GA	SO	GAA	SV%
1974–75	St. Catharines Black Hawks	OMJHL	15	—	—	—	871	71	0	4.89	—	—	—	—	—	—	—	—	—
1975–76	St. Catharines Black Hawks	OMJHL	39	—	—	—	1976	193	0	5.86	—	4	1	3	240	20	0	5.00	—
1976–77	Niagara Falls Flyers	OMJHL	39	—	—	—	2063	161	2	4.68	—	—	—	—	—	—	—	—	—
1977–78	Niagara Falls Flyers	OMJHL	53	—	—	—	3128	246	0	4.72	—	4	2	2	236	17	0	4.36	—
1978–79	Saginaw Gears	IHL	21	—	—	—	1050	58	0	3.31	—	—	—	—	—	—	—	—	—
1978–79	Milwaukee Admirals	IHL	14	—	—	—	715	42	1	3.52	—	7	—	—	334	23	0	4.14	—
1979–80	Maine Mariners	AHL	1	0	1	0	60	5	0	5.00	—	—	—	—	—	—	—	—	—
1979–80	Saginaw Gears	IHL	52	—	—	—	2827	178	0	3.78	—	4	—	—	213	13	0	3.66	—
1980–81	Saginaw Gears	IHL	43	—	—	—	2298	114	3	2.98	—	13	12	1	806	29	2	2.16	—
1981–82	Maine Mariners	AHL	33	16	11	4	1900	104	2	3.28	—	—	—	—	—	—	—	—	—
1982–83	Philadelphia Flyers	NHL	25	17	4	2	1407	59	4	2.52	.896	—	—	—	—	—	—	—	—
1982–83	Maine Mariners	AHL	33	18	11	3	1966	110	2	3.36	—	—	—	—	—	—	—	—	—
1983–84	Philadelphia Flyers	NHL	48	28	13	7	2863	150	2	3.14	.887	3	0	2	154	11	0	4.29	.857
1984–85	Philadelphia Flyers	NHL	17	13	2	0	923	37	1	2.41	.913	4	0	1	146	11	0	4.52	.845
1984–85	Hershey Bears	AHL	4	1	2	1	245	15	0	3.67	—	—	—	—	—	—	—	—	—
1985–86	Philadelphia Flyers	NHL	51	31	10	3	2728	116	5	2.55	.909	5	2	3	293	15	0	3.07	.880
1986–87	Philadelphia Flyers	NHL	3	3	0	0	180	8	0	2.67	.909	—	—	—	—	—	—	—	—
1986–87	New York Rangers	NHL	28	14	11	0	1474	92	0	3.74	.883	4	1	1	165	10	0	3.64	.896
1987–88	New York Rangers	NHL	25	8	11	3	1440	85	0	3.54	.878	—	—	—	—	—	—	—	—
1988–89	New York Rangers	NHL	30	9	14	4	1621	102	1	3.78	.870	2	0	2	72	8	0	6.68	.843
1989–90	New York Rangers	NHL	15	5	7	1	812	45	0	3.33	.873	—	—	—	—	—	—	—	—
NHL totals			242	128	72	20	13,448	694	13	3.10	.889	18	3	9	830	55	0	3.98	.869

=== International ===
Year	Team	Event	GP	W	L	T	MIN	GA	SO	GAA
1987	Canada	WC	5	1	3	1	300	18	1	3.60

== Awards and honours ==
Award	Year
NHL
NHL All-Star Game	1986
William M. Jennings Trophy	1986
