= Shawn Burr =

Canadian ice hockey player (1966-2013)

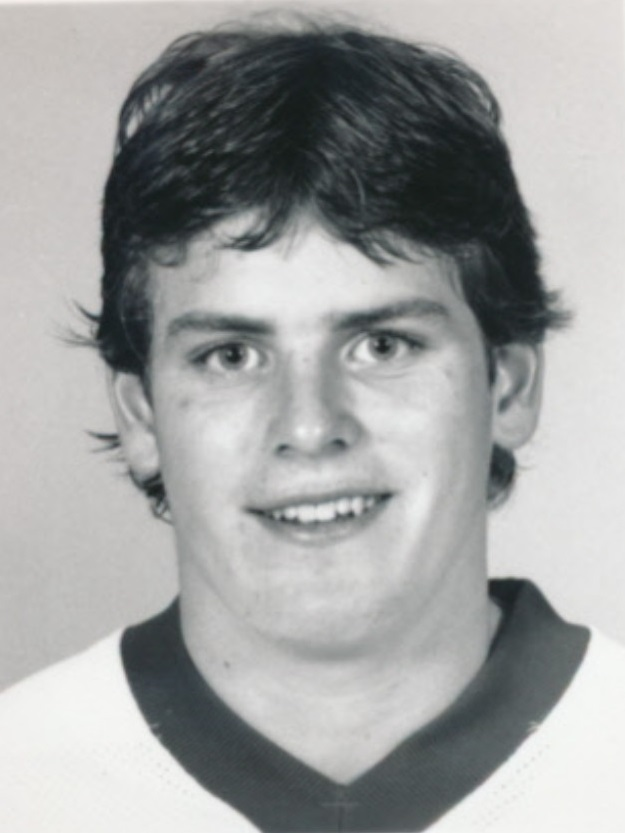
- Burr in 1984
- Born: July 1, 1966 Sarnia, Ontario, Canada
- Died: August 5, 2013 (aged 47) St. Clair, Michigan, U.S.
- Height: 6 ft 1 in (185 cm)
- Weight: 180 lb (82 kg; 12 st 12 lb)
- Position: Left wing
- Shot: Left
- Played for: Detroit Red Wings; Tampa Bay Lightning; San Jose Sharks
- National team: Canada
- NHL draft: 7th overall, 1984; Detroit Red Wings
- Playing career: 1985–2000

Shawn Christopher Burr (July 1, 1966 – August 5, 2013) was a Canadian professional ice hockey left winger. Burr played in the NHL for parts of 16 seasons from 1985 to 2000.

== Playing career ==
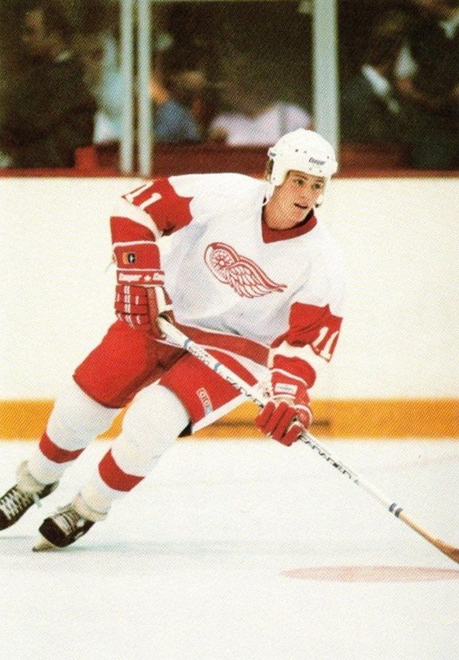
1986 photo of Burr for Detroit Red Wings

Burr was drafted in the first round (seventh overall) by the Detroit Red Wings in the 1984 NHL entry draft. Burr played 878 career NHL games with the Red Wings, Tampa Bay Lightning and the San Jose Sharks, scoring 181 goals and 259 assists for 440 points. He also garnered 1,069 penalty minutes.

In 2007, Burr was elected president of the Detroit Red Wings Alumni Association and was active in its efforts to raise money for children's charities in Metro Detroit.

Burr was the president of the Port Huron Icehawks IHL hockey organization.

== Personal ==
Burr was born in Sarnia, Ontario, Canada and lived there until his hockey career began.

On February 27, 2011, it was reported that Burr was diagnosed with myeloid leukemia, which in some cases requires a bone marrow transplant. He successfully completed chemotherapy and was reportedly cancer free. However, it returned the following year.

== Death ==
Burr died on August 5, 2013, after a fall in his home in St. Clair, Michigan caused massive brain trauma. It is unknown if the fall was related to the lasting side effects of his cancer treatments.

Burr was survived by his wife Amanda and their two daughters.

== Career statistics ==
=== Regular season and playoffs ===
			Regular season					Playoffs
Season	Team	League	GP	G	A	Pts	PIM	GP	G	A	Pts	PIM
1982–83	Sarnia Black Hawks	Midget	52	50	85	135	125	—	—	—	—	—
1983–84	Kitchener Rangers	OHL	68	41	44	85	50	16	5	12	17	22
1983–84	Kitchener Rangers	MC	—	—	—	—	—	4	2	3	5	4
1984–85	Detroit Red Wings	NHL	9	0	0	0	2	—	—	—	—	—
1984–85	Adirondack Red Wings	AHL	4	0	0	0	2	—	—	—	—	—
1984–85	Kitchener Rangers	OHL	48	24	42	66	50	4	3	3	6	2
1985–86	Detroit Red Wings	NHL	5	1	0	1	4	—	—	—	—	—
1985–86	Kitchener Rangers	OHL	59	60	67	127	83	5	2	3	5	8
1985–86	Adirondack Red Wings	AHL	3	2	2	4	2	17	5	7	12	32
1986–87	Detroit Red Wings	NHL	80	22	25	47	107	16	7	2	9	20
1987–88	Detroit Red Wings	NHL	78	17	23	40	97	9	3	1	4	14
1988–89	Detroit Red Wings	NHL	79	19	27	46	78	6	1	2	3	6
1989–90	Adirondack Red Wings	AHL	3	4	2	6	2	—	—	—	—	—
1989–90	Detroit Red Wings	NHL	76	24	32	56	82	—	—	—	—	—
1990–91	Detroit Red Wings	NHL	80	20	30	50	112	7	0	4	4	15
1991–92	Detroit Red Wings	NHL	79	19	32	51	118	11	1	5	6	19
1992–93	Detroit Red Wings	NHL	80	10	25	35	74	7	2	1	3	2
1993–94	Detroit Red Wings	NHL	51	10	12	22	31	7	2	0	2	6
1994–95	Detroit Red Wings	NHL	42	6	8	14	60	16	0	2	2	6
1995–96	Tampa Bay Lightning	NHL	81	13	15	28	119	6	0	2	2	8
1996–97	Tampa Bay Lightning	NHL	74	14	21	35	106	—	—	—	—	—
1997–98	San Jose Sharks	NHL	42	6	6	12	50	6	0	0	0	8
1998–99	San Jose Sharks	NHL	18	0	1	1	29	—	—	—	—	—
1998–99	Kentucky Thoroughblades	AHL	26	10	14	24	29	12	4	9	13	10
1999–2000	Tampa Bay Lightning	NHL	4	0	2	2	0	—	—	—	—	—
1999–2000	Detroit Vipers	IHL	10	2	4	6	10	—	—	—	—	—
1999–2000	Manitoba Moose	IHL	18	3	2	5	6	2	1	0	1	6
NHL totals			878	181	259	440	1,069	91	16	19	35	95

=== International ===
Year	Team	Event	GP	G	A	Pts	PIM
1990	Canada	WC	10	4	1	5	14

== Awards ==
- 1983-84 OHL Rookie of the Year
- 1985-86 OHL Second All-Star team

Preceded by Steve Yzerman	Detroit Red Wings first-round draft pick 1984	Succeeded by Brent Fedyk
