= Kjell Dahlin =

Swedish ice hockey player

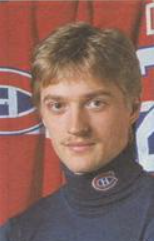
- Dahlin in 1987 photo
- Born: 2 March 1963 (age 63) Timrå, Sweden
- Height: 6 ft 0 in (183 cm)
- Weight: 174 lb (79 kg; 12 st 6 lb)
- Position: Right wing
- Shot: Left
- Played for: Timrå IK; Färjestads BK; Montreal Canadiens
- NHL draft: 82nd overall, 1981; Montreal Canadiens
- Playing career: 1981–1994

Kjell Håkan Dahlin (born 2 March 1963) is a Swedish former professional ice hockey forward. He played for the Montreal Canadiens in the NHL in the mid-1980s.

== NHL ==
Dahlin was drafted by the Montreal Canadiens in 1981 in the fourth round as the 82nd pick overall. Dahlin played in Sweden until 1985 when he joined the Canadiens.

In his first season in the NHL, he played 77 games. He scored 32 goals and 71 points, tying a club record for points by a rookie that fellow countryman and teammate Mats Näslund set and also setting a club rookie goals record. His point total made him the top scoring rookie that season but an outstanding season by first-year defenceman Gary Suter kept Dahlin from capturing the rookie of the year honors. However, he was named to the NHL All-Rookie Team. Despite his impressive points total during the regular season, Dahlin was held to just two goals and five points in the playoffs which saw the Canadiens go on to win the Stanley Cup in 1986.

In his second season, injuries limited Dahlin to just 41 games, and his point total dropped to 20. In 1987–88, Dahlin's third year, injuries again limited him as he played just 48 games this time scoring 25 points.

== Back to Sweden ==
With diminishing returns and bad luck on the injury front, Dahlin opted to return to Sweden for the 1988–89 campaign. Dahlin rejoined Färjestads BK, the Swedish Elite League club team he spent three seasons with before joining Montreal. Dahlin played six seasons with them then retired from the game in 1994.

Dahlin only played 11 games with the Swedish national team and never played with them in any major tournament.

== Career statistics ==
=== Regular season and playoffs ===
			Regular season					Playoffs
Season	Team	League	GP	G	A	Pts	PIM	GP	G	A	Pts	PIM
1978–79	Timrå IK	SWE II	2	0	0	0	0	—	—	—	—	—
1979–80	Timrå IK	SWE II	14	4	1	5	0	—	—	—	—	—
1980–81	Timrå IK	SWE II	25	7	12	19	16	—	—	—	—	—
1981–82	Timrå IK	SEL	36	16	7	23	14	—	—	—	—	—
1982–83	Färjestad BK	SEL	32	10	8	18	2	7	0	0	0	2
1983–84	Färjestad BK	SEL	36	19	9	28	16	—	—	—	—	—
1984–85	Färjestad BK	SEL	35	21	25	46	10	3	2	1	3	0
1985–86	Montreal Canadiens	NHL	77	32	39	71	71	16	2	3	5	4
1986–87	Montreal Canadiens	NHL	41	12	8	20	0	8	2	4	6	0
1987–88	Montreal Canadiens	NHL	48	13	12	25	6	11	2	4	6	2
1988–89	Färjestad BK	SEL	37	23	20	43	24	2	1	0	1	0
1989–90	Färjestad BK	SEL	30	26	12	38	12	—	—	—	—	—
1990–91	Färjestad BK	SEL	31	9	8	17	14	—	—	—	—	—
1991–92	Färjestad BK	SEL	25	6	10	16	10	6	4	1	5	4
1992–93	Färjestad BK	SEL	36	4	8	12	4	3	2	0	2	4
1993–94	Färjestad BK	SEL	16	0	1	1	0	—	—	—	—	—
1993–94	Färjestad BK	Allsv	8	1	0	1	0	—	—	—	—	—
1993–94	Grums IK	SWE II	4	0	5	5	0	—	—	—	—	—
SWE II totals			45	11	18	29	16	—	—	—	—	—
SEL totals			314	134	108	242	106	21	9	2	11	10
NHL totals			166	57	59	116	77	35	6	11	17	6

=== International ===
Year	Team	Event	GP	G	A	Pts	PIM
1980	Sweden	EJC	5	1	0	1	0
1981	Sweden	EJC	5	4	5	9	4
1982	Sweden	WJC	7	5	1	6	4
1983	Sweden	WJC	7	3	4	7	2
Junior totals			24	13	10	23	10
