= Mario Gosselin (ice hockey) =

Canadian ice hockey player (born 1963)

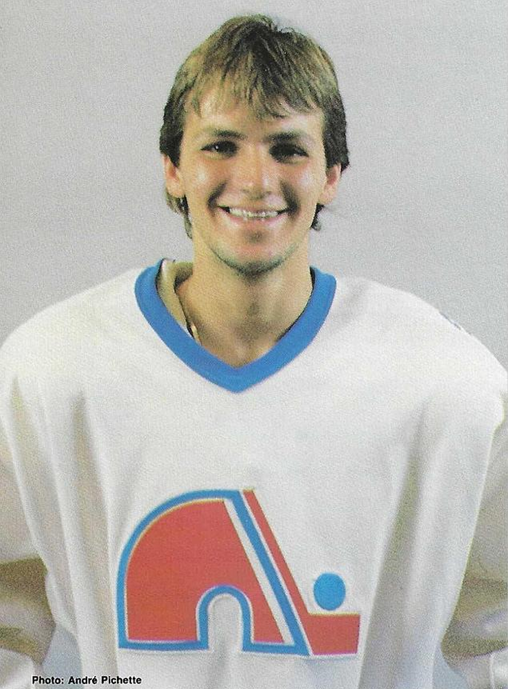
- Born: June 15, 1963 (age 63) Thetford Mines, Quebec, Canada
- Height: 5 ft 8 in (173 cm)
- Weight: 160 lb (73 kg; 11 st 6 lb)
- Position: Goaltender
- Caught: Left
- Played for: Quebec Nordiques; Los Angeles Kings; Hartford Whalers
- NHL draft: 55th overall, 1982; Quebec Nordiques
- Playing career: 1983–1994

Mario Gosselin (born June 15, 1963) is a Canadian former hockey goaltender who played nine years in the National Hockey League (NHL) for the Quebec Nordiques, the Los Angeles Kings and the Hartford Whalers.

== Playing career ==
As a youth, Gosselin played in the 1975 and 1976 Quebec International Pee-Wee Hockey Tournaments with a minor ice hockey team from Thetford Mines.

Gosselin played his junior hockey for the Shawinigan Cataractes of the QMJHL from 1980–1981 to 1982–1983. He was drafted by the Quebec Nordiques with 55th pick (third round) of the 1982 NHL entry draft.

He then represented Canada at the 1983 World Junior Championships as a spare goalie than continued to play for Canada joining the national team for the 1984 Sarajevo Olympics where he played seven games winning four of them and helping Canada finish fourth.

== Quebec Nordiques ==
Following the Games, he joined the Nordiques making a memorable debut on February 26, 1984, by blanking the St. Louis Blues 5–0.

The following year he formed a tandem with veteran Dan Bouchard and took over the starting job for good by playoff time helping backstop the Nordiques past the Buffalo Sabres in the first round and their fierce rivals the Montreal Canadiens in the second round before falling to the Philadelphia Flyers in the Semi-Finals.

The 1985-86 season had highs and lows for Gosselin. He battled for ice time with newcomer Clint Malarchuk and veteran Richard Sévigny and played well enough to be selected to play in the 1986 All-Star Game, but also struggled enough to spend five games in the American Hockey League with the Fredericton Express. His season ended on a high note, however, when Gosselin excelled for the Nordiques in the post-season going 7-4 after taking over the crease from Malarchuk.

He spent the next season in a backup role but returned to the starting job in 1987-88 after Malarchuk was traded to the Washington Capitals. Gosselin and the Nordiques had a forgettable season and the following year, with veteran Bob Mason signed and rookie Ron Tugnutt pushing for starts Gosselin saw his playing time cut and again had a brief stint in the AHL. After the season, the Nordiques didn't renew his contract on June 6, 1989, and he signed with the Los Angeles Kings.

== Los Angeles Kings ==
Gosselin served as the back-up to Kelly Hrudey but was largely ineffective posting a 7-11-1 record with a 3.87 goals against average. He did manage to get in the history books during his time with the Kings, even if it was for dubious reasons. Mario Gosselin was the first goaltender in NHL history to lose a game without giving up a goal. Gosselin filled in for Kelly Hrudey and the Kings gave up an empty net goal. The result was a 7–6 loss to the Edmonton Oilers.

When the Kings acquired netminder Daniel Berthiaume the following off-season, Gosselin lost his job and spent the 1990-91 season as the starting goalie with the Kings International Hockey League affiliate in Phoenix.

== Hartford Whalers ==
In 1991-92, he signed with the Hartford Whalers but failed to return to the NHL that year and ended up spending his second consecutive season at the minor league level playing for the Springfield Indians of the American Hockey League. During training camp before the 1992-93 campaign, Gosselin suffered a serious back injury that cost him four months. The injury was so serious, Gosselin feared his career might have been over. "At a certain point in December, they told me maybe I would never play again. All I wanted to do was play hockey again." He worked his way back into the Springfield lineup but an injury to Whaler back-up Frank Pietrangelo brought him back to the NHL after nearly three years away. Shortly after, starter Sean Burke suffered back spasms and suddenly Gosselin was an NHL starter again. In 16 games with the Whalers that year he posted better numbers than incumbents Burke and Pietrangelo and impressed the Whaler brass enough to earn a new two-year contract that March. The following season, he played 2 games in Springfield and 7 in Hartford before suffering a knee injury on November 27, 1993, in a game against the Florida Panthers that ultimately ended his season and career.

== Career statistics ==
=== Regular season and playoffs ===
			Regular season									Playoffs
Season	Team	League	GP	W	L	T	MIN	GA	SO	GAA	SV%	GP	W	L	MIN	GA	SO	GAA	SV%
1979–80	Montréal L'Est Cantonniers	QMAAA	8	6	0	0	—	—	0	4.09	—	—	—	—	—	—	—	—	—
1980–81	Shawinigan Cataractes	QMJHL	21	4	10	0	908	76	0	5.02	.846	1	0	0	20	2	0	6.00	.818
1981–82	Shawinigan Cataractes	QMJHL	60	33	25	2	3385	230	0	4.08	.885	14	7	7	787	58	0	4.42	.879
1982–83	Shawinigan Cataractes	QMJHL	46	32	9	1	2561	133	3	3.12	.895	8	5	3	458	29	0	3.80	.863
1983–84	Canada	Intl	36	—	—	—	2007	126	0	3.77	—	—	—	—	—	—	—	—	—
1983–84	Quebec Nordiques	NHL	3	2	0	0	148	3	1	1.22	.955	—	—	—	—	—	—	—	—
1984–85	Quebec Nordiques	NHL	35	19	11	3	1960	109	1	3.34	.877	17	9	8	1059	54	0	3.06	.886
1985–86	Quebec Nordiques	NHL	31	14	14	1	1726	111	2	3.86	.861	1	0	1	40	5	0	7.50	.773
1985–86	Fredericton Express	AHL	5	2	2	1	304	15	0	2.96	.894	—	—	—	—	—	—	—	—
1986–87	Quebec Nordiques	NHL	30	13	11	1	1625	86	0	3.18	.887	11	7	4	654	37	0	3.39	.887
1987–88	Quebec Nordiques	NHL	54	20	28	4	3002	189	2	3.78	.867	—	—	—	—	—	—	—	—
1988–89	Quebec Nordiques	NHL	39	11	19	3	2064	146	0	4.24	.868	—	—	—	—	—	—	—	—
1988–89	Halifax Citadels	AHL	3	3	0	0	183	9	0	2.95	.878	—	—	—	—	—	—	—	—
1989–90	Los Angeles Kings	NHL	26	7	11	1	1226	79	0	3.87	.865	3	0	2	63	3	0	2.90	.870
1990–91	Phoenix Roadrunners	IHL	46	24	15	4	2673	172	1	3.86	—	11	7	4	670	43	0	3.85	—
1991–92	Springfield Indians	AHL	47	28	11	5	2606	142	0	3.27	.894	6	1	4	319	18	0	3.39	.901
1992–93	Hartford Whalers	NHL	16	5	9	1	867	57	0	3.94	.886	—	—	—	—	—	—	—	—
1992–93	Springfield Indians	AHL	23	8	7	7	1345	75	0	3.35	.884	—	—	—	—	—	—	—	—
1993–94	Hartford Whalers	NHL	7	0	4	0	239	21	0	5.27	.804	—	—	—	—	—	—	—	—
1993–94	Springfield Indians	AHL	2	2	0	0	120	5	0	2.50	.896	—	—	—	—	—	—	—	—
NHL totals			241	91	107	14	12,857	801	6	3.74	.871	32	16	15	1816	99	0	3.27	.883

=== International ===
Year	Team	Event	GP	W	L	T	MIN	GA	SO	GAA
1983	Canada	WJC	DNP	—	—	—	—	—	—	—
1984	Canada	OG	7	4	3	0	380	14	0	2.21
