= 1987–88 Hartford Whalers season =

National Hockey League team season

1987–88 Hartford Whalers
- Division: 4th Adams
- Conference: 10th Wales
- 1987–88 record: 35–38–7
- Home record: 21–14–5
- Road record: 14–24–2
- Goals for: 249
- Goals against: 267

Team information
- General manager: Emile Francis
- Coach: Jack Evans (22-25-7); Larry Pleau (13-13-0)
- Captain: Ron Francis
- Alternate captains: Dave Tippett; Joel Quenneville
- Arena: Hartford Civic Center
- Average attendance: 14,574 (95.7%)
- Minor league affiliates: Binghamton Whalers (AHL); Milwaukee Admirals (IHL)

Team leaders
- Goals: Kevin Dineen (25); Ron Francis (25)
- Assists: Ron Francis (50)
- Points: Ron Francis (75)
- Penalty minutes: Torrie Robertson (293)
- Plus/minus: Randy Ladouceur (+7)
- Wins: Mike Liut (25)
- Goals against average: Mike Liut (3.18)

The 1987–88 Hartford Whalers season was the Whalers' ninth season in the National Hockey League (NHL).

== Offseason ==
On June 13, 1987, the 1987 NHL entry draft was held at Joe Louis Arena in Detroit, Michigan. With their first round draft pick, the Whalers selected Jody Hull from the Peterborough Petes of the Ontario Hockey League. During the 1986–87 season with the Petes, Hull scored 18 goals and 52 points in 49 games. With their second round selection, the Whalers selected defenceman Adam Burt from the North Bay Centennials of the OHL, while in the fourth round, the club selected center Terry Yake from the Brandon Wheat Kings from the Western Hockey League.

On July 29, the Whalers signed free agent Tom Martin. In 11 games with the Winnipeg Jets during the 1986–87 season, Martin scored one goal. He also played in 18 games with the Adirondack Red Wings of the American Hockey League, scoring five goals and 11 points.

The Whalers and Toronto Maple Leafs made a trade on September 8, with Hartford acquiring Bill Root from Toronto for Dave Semenko. Root scored three goals and six points in 34 games with the Maple Leafs during the 1986–87 season.

On September 15, Hartford signed free agent Roger Kortko to a contract. Kortko was a member of the New York Islanders organization, and scored 16 goals and 46 points with their AHL affiliate, the Springfield Indians, during the 1986–87 season.

Wayne Babych announced his retirement from hockey on September 29. Babych appeared in four games with Hartford during the 1986–87 season, earning no points. He played a majority of the season with the Binghamton Whalers of the American Hockey League, scoring nine goals and 42 points in 78 games. During his NHL career, which began with the St. Louis Blues in 1978–79, Babych scored 192 goals and 438 points in 519 games while playing for the Blues, Pittsburgh Penguins, Quebec Nordiques, and the Whalers.

On October 5, the Whalers acquired Mark Reeds from the St. Louis Blues in a trade in which Hartford sent St. Louis their third round draft selection in the 1989 NHL entry draft. Reeds scored nine goals and 25 points in 68 games with the Blues in the 1986–87 season.

During the waiver draft, which was held on October 5, the Whalers claimed Brent Peterson from the Vancouver Canucks and Doug Wickenheiser from the St. Louis Blues. Hartford lost newly signed free agent Bill Root in the waiver draft to the St. Louis Blues, while Wickenheiser was then claimed by the Vancouver Canucks. Peterson, who remained with the Whalers, scored seven goals and 22 points in 69 games with the Canucks during the 1986–87 season.

=== Draft picks ===
Hartford's draft picks at the 1987 NHL entry draft held at the Joe Louis Arena in Detroit, Michigan.

Round	#	Player	Nationality	College/Junior/Club team (League)
1	18	Jody Hull	Canada	Peterborough Petes (OHL)
2	39	Adam Burt	United States	North Bay Centennials (OHL)
4	81	Terry Yake	Canada	Brandon Wheat Kings (WHL)
5	102	Mark Rousseau	Canada	University of Denver (WCHA)
6	132	Jeff St. Cyr	Canada	Michigan Technological University (WCHA)
7	144	Gregg Wolf	United States	Buffalo Regals (EEMHL)
8	165	John Moore	Canada	Yale University (ECAC)
9	186	Joe Day	United States	St. Lawrence University (ECAC)
11	228	Kevin Sullivan	United States	Princeton University (ECAC)
12	249	Steve Laurin	Canada	Dartmouth College (ECAC)
S2	19	Ken Lovsin	Canada	University of Saskatchewan (CIAU)

== Regular season ==
The Whalers had the league's best penalty-kill percentage, with 84.27% (359 for 426).

=== Final standings ===
Adams Division
	GP	W	L	T	GF	GA	Pts
**Montreal Canadiens**	80	45	22	13	298	238	103
**Boston Bruins**	80	44	30	6	300	251	94
**Buffalo Sabres**	80	37	32	11	283	305	85
**Hartford Whalers**	80	35	38	7	249	267	77
Quebec Nordiques	80	32	43	5	271	306	69

Note: GP = Games played, W = Wins, L = Losses, T = Ties, Pts = Points, GF = Goals for, GA = Goals against
Note: Teams that qualified for the playoffs are highlighted in bold.

=== Record vs. opponents ===
Adams Division record vs. opponents

==== Vs. Wales Conference ====
**Vs. Adams Division**

1987–88 NHL records
Team	**BOS**	**BUF**	**HFD**	**MTL**	**QUE**	**Total**
Boston	—	4–3–1	4–3–1	3–4–1	5–3	**16–13–3**
Buffalo	3–4–1	—	3–4–1	3–3–2	5–2–1	**14–13–5**
Hartford	3–4–1	4–3–1	—	2–4–2	2–6	**11–17–4**
Montreal	4–3–1	3–3–2	4–2−2	—	6–2	**17–10–5**
Quebec	3–5	2–5–1	6–2	2–6	—	**13–18–1**

**Vs. Patrick Division**

1987–88 NHL records
Team	**NJD**	**NYI**	**NYR**	**PHI**	**PIT**	**WSH**	**Total**
Boston	2–1	1–2	1–2	1–2	2–0–1	1–2	**8–9–1**
Buffalo	2–0–1	1–2	3–0	0–3	0–2–1	2–0–1	**8–7–3**
Hartford	1–1–1	1–2	1–2	1–2	1–2	1–2	**6–11–1**
Montreal	1–2	3–0	1–1–1	1–0–2	1–2	1–1–1	**8–6–4**
Quebec	3–0	1–2	1–2	0–2–1	0–3	1–2	**6–11–1**

==== Vs. Campbell Conference ====
**Vs. Norris Division**

1987–88 NHL records
Team	**CHI**	**DET**	**MIN**	**STL**	**TOR**	**Total**
Boston	3–0	1–2	3–0	1–2	2–1	**10–5–0**
Buffalo	2–1	1–2	1–1–1	3–0	3–0	**10–4–1**
Hartford	2–1	2–1	3–0	1–2	3–0	**11–4–0**
Montreal	2–0–1	2–1	1–1–1	2–1	3–0	**10–3–2**
Quebec	2–0–1	3–0	2–1	1–2	3–0	**11–3–1**

**Vs. Smythe Division**

1987–88 NHL records
Team	**CGY**	**EDM**	**LAK**	**VAN**	**WIN**	**Total**
Boston	2–1	1–1–1	2–0–1	2–1	3–0	**10–3–2**
Buffalo	1–2	0–3	2–1	1–1–1	1–1–1	**5–8–2**
Hartford	0–3	1–2	3–0	1–0–2	2–1	**7–6–2**
Montreal	0–2–1	3–0	2–1	2–0–1	3–0	**10–3–2**
Quebec	0–3	1–1–1	1–2	0–3	0–2–1	**2–11–2**

== Schedule and results ==
1987–88 regular season
October

Game	Result	Date	Score	Opponent	Record
1	L	October 8, 1987	1–5	Quebec Nordiques (1987–88)	0–1–0
2	L	October 10, 1987	2–6	New York Rangers (1987–88)	0–2–0
3	L	October 11, 1987	2–5	@ Boston Bruins (1987–88)	0–3–0
4	L	October 14, 1987	1–3	@ New Jersey Devils (1987–88)	0–4–0
5	L	October 16, 1987	2–6	@ Washington Capitals (1987–88)	0–5–0
6	W	October 17, 1987	4–3 OT	New Jersey Devils (1987–88)	1–5–0
7	W	October 21, 1987	5–3	@ Buffalo Sabres (1987–88)	2–5–0
8	W	October 24, 1987	5–3	Chicago Blackhawks (1987–88)	3–5–0
9	T	October 28, 1987	2–2 OT	Buffalo Sabres (1987–88)	3–5–1
10	W	October 31, 1987	7–4	Philadelphia Flyers (1987–88)	4–5–1

November

Game	Result	Date	Score	Opponent	Record
11	W	November 1, 1987	5–1	@ Quebec Nordiques (1987–88)	5–5–1
12	T	November 4, 1987	2–2 OT	Boston Bruins (1987–88)	5–5–2
13	L	November 6, 1987	1–3	@ Detroit Red Wings (1987–88)	5–6–2
14	L	November 7, 1987	3–5	Quebec Nordiques (1987–88)	5–7–2
15	T	November 11, 1987	0–0 OT	Montreal Canadiens (1987–88)	5–7–3
16	L	November 14, 1987	1–4	@ Boston Bruins (1987–88)	5–8–3
17	T	November 16, 1987	3–3 OT	@ Montreal Canadiens (1987–88)	5–8–4
18	W	November 18, 1987	9–1	Buffalo Sabres (1987–88)	6–8–4
19	L	November 21, 1987	3–4	Washington Capitals (1987–88)	6–9–4
20	L	November 25, 1987	5–6	Montreal Canadiens (1987–88)	6–10–4
21	W	November 27, 1987	4–2	@ Buffalo Sabres (1987–88)	7–10–4
22	W	November 28, 1987	4–2	@ Toronto Maple Leafs (1987–88)	8–10–4

December

Game	Result	Date	Score	Opponent	Record
23	L	December 2, 1987	3–5	Boston Bruins (1987–88)	8–11–4
24	L	December 3, 1987	2–5	@ Philadelphia Flyers (1987–88)	8–12–4
25	W	December 5, 1987	2–1	Buffalo Sabres (1987–88)	9–12–4
26	W	December 8, 1987	5–4	@ Quebec Nordiques (1987–88)	10–12–4
27	W	December 9, 1987	5–4	Washington Capitals (1987–88)	11–12–4
28	W	December 12, 1987	3–2	Los Angeles Kings (1987–88)	12–12–4
29	T	December 15, 1987	2–2 OT	Vancouver Canucks (1987–88)	12–12–5
30	L	December 17, 1987	0–2	St. Louis Blues (1987–88)	12–13–5
31	W	December 19, 1987	4–3	@ Edmonton Oilers (1987–88)	13–13–5
32	T	December 20, 1987	3–3 OT	@ Vancouver Canucks (1987–88)	13–13–6
33	L	December 22, 1987	5–6 OT	@ Calgary Flames (1987–88)	13–14–6
34	L	December 26, 1987	2–4	Quebec Nordiques (1987–88)	13–15–6
35	L	December 27, 1987	3–5	@ Quebec Nordiques (1987–88)	13–16–6
36	W	December 30, 1987	3–1	Toronto Maple Leafs (1987–88)	14–16–6

January

Game	Result	Date	Score	Opponent	Record
37	T	January 2, 1988	1–1 OT	New Jersey Devils (1987–88)	14–16–7
38	L	January 6, 1988	1–5	Edmonton Oilers (1987–88)	14–17–7
39	L	January 8, 1988	1–3	@ Buffalo Sabres (1987–88)	14–18–7
40	W	January 9, 1988	5–4 OT	Pittsburgh Penguins (1987–88)	15–18–7
41	W	January 11, 1988	4–3	@ Boston Bruins (1987–88)	16–18–7
42	L	January 13, 1988	1–2	@ Chicago Blackhawks (1987–88)	16–19–7
43	L	January 14, 1988	2–3	@ St. Louis Blues (1987–88)	16–20–7
44	W	January 16, 1988	4–3	@ Los Angeles Kings (1987–88)	17–20–7
45	W	January 19, 1988	6–3	@ Minnesota North Stars (1987–88)	18–20–7
46	W	January 21, 1988	4–3	New York Islanders (1987–88)	19–20–7
47	W	January 23, 1988	5–0	Minnesota North Stars (1987–88)	20–20–7
48	W	January 24, 1988	2–1 OT	Detroit Red Wings (1987–88)	21–20–7
49	L	January 27, 1988	1–5	@ Calgary Flames (1987–88)	21–21–7
50	W	January 29, 1988	4–2	@ Vancouver Canucks (1987–88)	22–21–7
51	L	January 30, 1988	2–5	@ Edmonton Oilers (1987–88)	22–22–7

February

Game	Result	Date	Score	Opponent	Record
52	L	February 1, 1988	4–5	@ Montreal Canadiens (1987–88)	22–23–7
53	L	February 3, 1988	2–5	Montreal Canadiens (1987–88)	22–24–7
54	L	February 6, 1988	4–5	@ Pittsburgh Penguins (1987–88)	22–25–7
55	W	February 7, 1988	4–2	Toronto Maple Leafs (1987–88)	23–25–7
56	W	February 13, 1988	4–1	@ Montreal Canadiens (1987–88)	24–25–7
57	L	February 15, 1988	4–5 OT	@ Philadelphia Flyers (1987–88)	24–26–7
58	W	February 17, 1988	4–3	Winnipeg Jets (1987–88)	25–26–7
59	L	February 20, 1988	0–3	@ New York Islanders (1987–88)	25–27–7
60	L	February 21, 1988	2–7	New York Islanders (1987–88)	25–28–7
61	W	February 23, 1988	3–2	Boston Bruins (1987–88)	26–28–7
62	L	February 25, 1988	2–5	@ Boston Bruins (1987–88)	26–29–7
63	L	February 27, 1988	3–4	Buffalo Sabres (1987–88)	26–30–7

March

Game	Result	Date	Score	Opponent	Record
64	L	March 1, 1988	3–6	@ Winnipeg Jets (1987–88)	26–31–7
65	W	March 2, 1988	2–1	@ Chicago Blackhawks (1987–88)	27–31–7
66	W	March 5, 1988	3–1	New York Rangers (1987–88)	28–31–7
67	L	March 8, 1988	4–6	@ Quebec Nordiques (1987–88)	28–32–7
68	W	March 9, 1988	5–4	Los Angeles Kings (1987–88)	29–32–7
69	L	March 12, 1988	0–5	@ Montreal Canadiens (1987–88)	29–33–7
70	L	March 13, 1988	1–4	Quebec Nordiques (1987–88)	29–34–7
71	L	March 15, 1988	6–8	Calgary Flames (1987–88)	29–35–7
72	W	March 19, 1988	5–3	@ St. Louis Blues (1987–88)	30–35–7
73	L	March 20, 1988	1–2	@ New York Rangers (1987–88)	30–36–7
74	W	March 22, 1988	4–3	Winnipeg Jets (1987–88)	31–36–7
75	W	March 24, 1988	3–2	@ Detroit Red Wings (1987–88)	32–36–7
76	W	March 26, 1988	8–1	Minnesota North Stars (1987–88)	33–36–7
77	W	March 27, 1988	4–2	Montreal Canadiens (1987–88)	34–36–7
78	L	March 31, 1988	2–3	@ Buffalo Sabres (1987–88)	34–37–7

April

Game	Result	Date	Score	Opponent	Record
79	W	April 2, 1988	4–2	Boston Bruins (1987–88)	35–37–7
80	L	April 3, 1988	2–4	@ Pittsburgh Penguins (1987–88)	35–38–7

Legend: Win (2 points) Loss (0 points) Tie (1 point)

== Playoffs ==
=== Canadiens 4, Whalers 2 ===
The Whalers opened the 1988 Stanley Cup playoffs against the Montreal Canadiens in a best-of-seven series. Montreal finished the regular season with a 45–22–13 record, earning 103 points, which placed them first in the Adams Division. The Canadiens finished with 26 more points than Hartford during the regular season. Previously, the Whalers and Canadiens met twice in the post-season, with Montreal winning both series. Their most recent match-up was during the 1986 Stanley Cup playoffs, as Montreal defeated Hartford with an overtime goal in game seven of the Adams Division final. The Canadiens went on to win the Stanley Cup that season.

The series opened on April 6 at the Montreal Forum in Montreal. Mike Liut got the start in goal for Hartford, while Patrick Roy started for Montreal. The Whalers scored the lone goal in the first period, as Randy Ladouceur scored 7:59 into the period, giving Hartford a 1–0 lead. In the second period, the Canadiens evened the game on a goal by Shayne Corson 2:54 into the period, followed by a goal by Bobby Smith less than two minutes later, giving the Canadiens a 2–1 after the second period. In the third period, the Whalers Richard Brodeur came into the game to play in goal, as Mike Liut was forced out of the game due to an injury. Despite the injury to their starting goaltender, the Whalers scored a quick goal, as Dave Babych scored 56 seconds into the period to tie the game 2-2. The Whalers took a 3–2 lead as Ron Francis scored a power play marker at 3:10. Montreal stormed back, as Chris Chelios scored on a Canadiens power play, evening the game at 3-3. The Canadiens regained the lead on a goal by Stéphane Richer midway through the period. Montreal held on for the 4–3 victory, taking a 1–0 series lead.

Game two was played the next night in Montreal, as Richard Brodeur would get the start in goal for the Whalers due to an injury to Mike Liut. Patrick Roy was once again in goal for the Canadiens for the second game. The Canadiens took a 1–0 lead on a goal by Brian Skrudland 5:30 into the first period. The Whalers tied the game midway through the period on a goal by Lindsay Carson. At 13:37, a goal by Chris Chelios gave Montreal the lead back at 2–1. Less than a minute later, Kevin Dineen tied the game for Hartford, as the game was tied 2–2 after the first period. The Canadiens retook the lead, as Gilles Thibaudeau scored 2:39 into the period, followed by a goal by Claude Lemieux at 10:59, as Montreal took a 4–2 lead. The Whalers Scot Kleinendorst cut the Canadiens lead to 4–3 with a goal at 12:52, as the Canadiens held the one goal lead after two periods. In the third period, Montreal scored three goals in a 2:38 span midway through the period, as Bobby Smith, Gilles Thibaudeau and Kjell Dahlin each scored, securing a 7–2 win for the Canadiens and a 2–0 series lead.

The series moved to the Hartford Civic Center for the third game on April 9, as Mike Liut returned in goal for the Whalers, while Patrick Roy made his third straight start for Montreal. The Whalers Stew Gavin scored an early goal, only 2:06 into the game, to give Hartford a 1–0 lead. The Canadiens tied the game midway through the period with a power play goal by Stephane Richer, as the score was 1–1 after the first period. The Whalers took a 2–1 lead with a power play goal by Sylvain Côté at the 6:31 mark of the second period. The Canadiens responded with three goals of their own before the period ended, as Craig Ludwig, Mike McPhee and Ryan Walter each scored, giving Montreal a 4–2 lead. In the third period, the Whalers Carey Wilson scored a power play goal 6:34 into the period, cutting the Canadiens lead to 4–3. Hartford couldn't manage to score another goal, as the Canadiens held on for the 4–3 victory, and took a commanding 3–0 series lead.

The fourth game was played the following evening, with both Mike Liut and Patrick Roy getting the starts once again in goal, as the Whalers faced elimination. The Canadiens took a 1–0 lead after Stephane Richer scored a goal at 3:22 into the first period. The Whalers quickly responded with a goal of their own, as Dean Evason scored 55 seconds later. At 8:29 of the first period, Dave Babych gave Hartford a 2–1 lead, which the Whalers took with them into the first intermission. In the second period, Stephane Richer scored his second goal of the game, which was the lone goal of the period, tying the game 2–2 after two periods. Only 59 seconds into the third period, the Whalers Dave Babych broke the tie, giving the Whalers a 3–2 lead. At 3:19, the Whalers Sylvain Côté took a four-minute high-sticking penalty, sending Montreal to the power play. The Canadiens scored twice on this power play, as Bobby Smith and Ryan Walter each scored, giving Montreal a 4–3 lead. At 11:20, the Whalers tied the game once again, as Kevin Dineen put the puck past Patrick Roy, tying the game 4-4. This was the start of a goal scoring outburst for Hartford, as Stew Gavin gave the Whalers a 5–4 lead with a goal 14:23. Kevin Dineen then scored a power play goal at 17:05, followed by a goal by Scott Young, his first career playoff goal, extending the Whalers lead to 7–4. Montreal's Gilles Thibaudeau scored a power play goal with 30 seconds left in the game, as Hartford staved off elimination with a 7–5 victory, cutting the Canadiens series lead to 3–1.

The series returned to Montreal for the fifth game on April 12, as Hartford once again was facing elimination. Richard Brodeur replaced Mike Liut in the Whalers goal, as he re-aggravated his injury. The Canadiens Brian Hayward got his first start of the series. Hartford scored the only goal of the first period, as Kevin Dineen scored midway through the period, taking a 1–0 lead into the first intermission. The Whalers Carey Wilson extended the lead to 2–0 with a goal at 5:40 of the second period. Montreal's Mike McPhee scored 31 seconds later, as Hartford held on to a 2–1 lead after two periods. In the third period, the game remained close, however, the Whalers Ron Francis scored an empty net goal with 16 seconds left in the period, securing the victory for the Whalers. This would be the last career post-season win for Richard Brodeur, who made 22 saves for the Whalers, as the Canadiens series lead was trimmed to 3–2.

Game six was back in Hartford on April 14, as both Richard Brodeur of the Whalers and Brian Hayward of the Canadiens got their second consecutive start. In the first period, the Canadiens Stephane Richer scored twice, as Montreal took a 2–0 lead after twenty minutes. In the second period, the Whalers Ray Ferraro scored a late period power play goal, cutting the Canadiens lead to 2–1. Both goaltenders continued to be sharp in the third period, as Hartford was unable to tie the game. The Canadiens won the game 2-1 and won the series 4–2, eliminating the Whalers from the post-season.

==== Adams Division Semi-finals ====
===== (1) Montreal Canadiens vs. (4) Hartford Whalers =====
April 6	Hartford Whalers	3 – 4	Montreal Canadiens	Montreal Forum	Recap
Ladouceur (1) – (Francis, Dineen) – 7:59		First period	No scoring
No scoring		Second period	2:54 – Corson (1) – (Richer, Svoboda); 4:48 – Smith (1) – (Lemieux, Walter)
Babych (1) – (Francis, Dineen) – 0:56; Francis (1) – pp – (Babych, Dineen) – 3:10		Third period	5:43 – pp – Chelios (1) – (Näslund, Walter); 9:50 – Richer – (Smith, Robinson)
Brodeur (0-1) (9 saves / 11 shots); Liut (22 saves / 24 shots)		Goalie stats	Roy (1-0) (21 saves / 24 shots)

April 7	Hartford Whalers	3 – 7	Montreal Canadiens	Montreal Forum	Recap
Carson (1) – (Francis) – 9:47; Dineen (1) – (Unassisted) – 14:15		First period	5:30 – Skrudland (1) – (Robinson, Dahlin); 13:37 – Chelios (2) – (Carbonneau, Näslund)
Kleinendorst (1) – (Carson, Francis) – 12:52		Second period	2:39 – Thibaudeau (1) – (Näslund, Richer); 10:59 – Lemieux (1) – (Näslund, Thibaudeau)
No scoring		Third period	9:05 – Smith (2) – (Walter); 10:55 – Thibaudeau (2) – (Näslund, Richer); 11:43 – Dahlin (1) – (McPhee, Skrudland)
Brodeur (0-2) (21 saves / 28 shots)		Goalie stats	Roy (2-0) (28 saves / 31 shots)

April 9	Montreal Canadiens	4 – 3	Hartford Whalers	Hartford Civic Center	Recap
Richer (2) – pp – (Näslund, Svoboda) – 9:21		First period	2:06 – Gavin (1) – (MacDermid, Wilson)
Ludwig (1) – (Carbonneau, Gainey) – 8:33; McPhee (1) – (Momesso, Green) – 9:32; Walter (1) – pp – (Näslund, Robinson) – 13:52		Second period	6:31 – pp – Côté (1) – (Gavin, Wilson)
No scoring		Third period	6:34 – pp – Wilson (1) – (MacDermid, Ferraro)
Roy (3-0) (30 saves / 33 shots)		Goalie stats	Liut (0-1) (23 saves / 27 shots)

April 10	Montreal Canadiens	5 – 7	Hartford Whalers	Hartford Civic Center	Recap
Richer (3) – (Unassisted) – 3:22		First period	4:17 – Evason (1) – (Robertson, Dineen); 8:29 – Babych (2) – (Wilson, MacDermid)
Richer (4) – (Smith, Lemieux – 13:17		Second period	No scoring
Smith (3) – pp – (Dahlin, Richer) – 4:06; Walter (2) – pp – (McPhee, Richer) – 5:02; Thibaudeau (3) – pp – (Boisvert – 19:30		Third period	0:59 – Babych (3) – (Kleinendorst); 11:20 – Dineen (2) – (Carson, Ladouceur); 14:23 – Gavin (2) – (Wilson, MacDermid); 17:05 – pp – Dineen (3) – (Babych, Côté); 17:54 – Young (1) – (Quenneville, Evason)
Roy (3-1) (36 saves / 43 shots)		Goalie stats	Liut (1-1) (26 saves / 31 shots)

April 12	Hartford Whalers	3 – 1	Montreal Canadiens	Montreal Forum	Recap
Dineen (4) – (Francis, Quenneville) – 10:01		First period	No scoring
Wilson (2) – (MacDermid, Gavin) – 5:40		Second period	6:11 – McPhee (2) – (Svoboda, Dahlin)
Francis (2) – en – (McEwen) – 19:44		Third period	No scoring
Brodeur (1-2) (22 saves / 23 shots)		Goalie stats	Hayward (0-1) (26 saves / 28 shots)

April 14	Montreal Canadiens	2 – 1	Hartford Whalers	Hartford Civic Center	Recap
Richer (5) – (Ludwig, Skrudland) – 9:15; Richer (6) – (Unassisted) – 17:59		First period	No scoring
No scoring		Second period	18:57 – pp – Ferraro (1) – (McEwen)
No scoring		Third period	No scoring
Hayward (1-1) (19 saves / 20 shots)		Goalie stats	Brodeur (1-3) (23 saves / 25 shots)

Montreal wins series 4 – 2

== Transactions ==
The Whalers were involved in the following transactions during the 1987–88 season.

=== Trades ===
September 8, 1987	To Toronto Maple Leafs Dave Semenko	To Hartford Whalers Bill Root
October 5, 1987	To St. Louis Blues 3rd round in 1989 – Blair Atcheynum	To Hartford Whalers Mark Reeds
October 15, 1987	To Los Angeles Kings Cash	To Hartford Whalers Tiger Williams
January 3, 1988	To Calgary Flames Shane Churla; Dana Murzyn	To Hartford Whalers Neil Sheehy; Carey Wilson; Lane MacDonald
January 22, 1988	To Philadelphia Flyers Paul Lawless	To Hartford Whalers Lindsay Carson
March 8, 1988	To St. Louis Blues 2nd round pick in 1989 – Rick Corriveau	To Hartford Whalers Charlie Bourgeois; 3rd round pick in 1989 – Blair Atcheynum
March 8, 1988	To Vancouver Canucks Steve Weeks	To Hartford Whalers Richard Brodeur

=== Waivers ===
October 5, 1987	From Vancouver Canucks Brent Peterson
October 5, 1987	From St. Louis Blues Doug Wickenheiser
October 5, 1987	To St. Louis Blues Bill Root
October 5, 1987	To Vancouver Canucks Doug Wickenheiser

=== Free agents ===
Player	Former team
Tom Martin	Winnipeg Jets
Roger Kortko	New York Islanders
Mike McEwen	HC Sierre (Switzerland)

Player	New team
Mike McEwen	HC Sierre (Switzerland)

== See also ==
- 1987–88 NHL season
