= 1987–88 St. Louis Blues season =

National Hockey League team season

1987–88 St. Louis Blues
- Division: 2nd Norris
- Conference: 5th Campbell
- 1987–88 record: 34–38–8
- Home record: 18–17–5
- Road record: 16–21–3
- Goals for: 278
- Goals against: 294

Team information
- General manager: Ron Caron
- Coach: Jacques Martin
- Captain: Brian Sutter
- Alternate captains: Bernie Federko; Rob Ramage (Oct-Mar); Doug Gilmour (Mar-Apr)
- Arena: St. Louis Arena

Team leaders
- Goals: Tony McKegney (40)
- Assists: Bernie Federko (69)
- Points: Bernie Federko (89)
- Penalty minutes: Todd Ewen (227)
- Wins: Greg Millen (21)
- Goals against average: Rick Wamsley (3.40)

The 1987–88 St. Louis Blues season was the St. Louis Blues' 21st season in the National Hockey League (NHL).

== Regular season ==
The Blues allowed the fewest short-handed goals during the regular season, with just 5.

=== Final standings ===
Norris Division
	GP	W	L	T	GF	GA	Pts
**Detroit Red Wings**	80	41	28	11	322	269	93
**St. Louis Blues**	80	34	38	8	278	294	76
**Chicago Blackhawks**	80	30	41	9	284	328	69
**Toronto Maple Leafs**	80	21	49	10	273	345	52
Minnesota North Stars	80	19	48	13	242	349	51

Note: GP = Games played, W = Wins, L = Losses, T = Ties, Pts = Points, GF = Goals for, GA = Goals against
Note: Teams that qualified for the playoffs are highlighted in bold.

=== Record vs. opponents ===
Norris Division record vs. opponents

==== Vs. Campbell Conference ====
**Vs. Norris Division**

1987–88 NHL records
Team	**CHI**	**DET**	**MIN**	**STL**	**TOR**	**Total**
Chicago	—	3–5	5–2–1	3–4–1	5–3	**16–14–2**
Detroit	5–3	—	4–3–1	4–1–3	3–3–2	**16–10–6**
Minnesota	2–5–1	3–4–1	—	2–5–1	4–1–3	**11–15–6**
St. Louis	4–3–1	1–4–3	5–2–1	—	6–1–1	**16–10–6**
Toronto	3–5	3–3–2	1–4–3	1–6–1	—	**8–18–6**

**Vs. Smythe Division**

1987–88 NHL records
Team	**CGY**	**EDM**	**LAK**	**VAN**	**WIN**	**Total**
Chicago	0–2–1	2–1	1–2	2–1	1–1–1	**6–7–2**
Detroit	1–1–1	2–1	2–1	2–1	2–0–1	**9–4–2**
Minnesota	0–2–1	0–2–1	0–3	1–2	0–2–1	**1–11–3**
St. Louis	1–2	0–3	1–2	2–1	1–2	**5–10–0**
Toronto	0–3	0–2–1	1–1–1	1–1–1	1–2	**3–9–3**

**Vs. Wales Conference**

**Vs. Adams Division**

1987–88 NHL records
Team	**BOS**	**BUF**	**HFD**	**MTL**	**QUE**	**Total**
Chicago	0–3	1–2	1–2	0–2–1	0–2–1	**2–11–2**
Detroit	2–1	2–1	1–2	1–2	0–3	**6–9–0**
Minnesota	0–3	1–1–1	0–3	1–1–1	1–2	**3–10–2**
St. Louis	2–1	0–3	2–1	1–2	2–1	**7–8–0**
Toronto	1–2	0–3	0–3	0–3	0–3	**1–14–0**

**Vs. Patrick Division**

1987–88 NHL records
Team	**NJD**	**NYI**	**NYR**	**PHI**	**PIT**	**WSH**	**Total**
Chicago	0–3	1–0–2	0–2–1	3–0	1–2	1–2	**6–9–3**
Detroit	3–0	2–1	1–1–1	0–2–1	2–1	2–0–1	**10–5–3**
Minnesota	0–3	1–1–1	1–2	1–2	1–2	0–2–1	**4–12–2**
St. Louis	0–3	0–2–1	0–3	1–2	3–0	2–0–1	**6–10–2**
Toronto	1–2	3–0	1–2	2–1	1–2	1–1–1	**9–8–1**

== Schedule and results ==
1987–88 regular season
October

Game	Result	Date	Score	Opponent	Record
1	L	October 8, 1987	2–8	@ Vancouver Canucks (1987–88)	0–1–0
2	L	October 10, 1987	2–4	@ Los Angeles Kings (1987–88)	0–2–0
3	L	October 14, 1987	3–5	@ Chicago Blackhawks (1987–88)	0–3–0
4	L	October 17, 1987	2–3	Chicago Blackhawks (1987–88)	0–4–0
5	W	October 20, 1987	6–2	Winnipeg Jets (1987–88)	1–4–0
6	W	October 24, 1987	4–0	Boston Bruins (1987–88)	2–4–0
7	L	October 27, 1987	3–5	Minnesota North Stars (1987–88)	2–5–0
8	W	October 29, 1987	3–2	@ Minnesota North Stars (1987–88)	3–5–0
9	T	October 31, 1987	3–3 OT	Detroit Red Wings (1987–88)	3–5–1

November

Game	Result	Date	Score	Opponent	Record
10	L	November 2, 1987	4–6	@ Montreal Canadiens (1987–88)	3–6–1
11	L	November 3, 1987	3–4	@ Quebec Nordiques (1987–88)	3–7–1
12	L	November 5, 1987	3–5	@ New Jersey Devils (1987–88)	3–8–1
13	W	November 7, 1987	4–3	@ Toronto Maple Leafs (1987–88)	4–8–1
14	W	November 10, 1987	5–2	Philadelphia Flyers (1987–88)	5–8–1
15	L	November 12, 1987	3–4	New York Islanders (1987–88)	5–9–1
16	L	November 14, 1987	5–6 OT	Edmonton Oilers (1987–88)	5–10–1
17	W	November 18, 1987	6–3	@ Toronto Maple Leafs (1987–88)	6–10–1
18	T	November 19, 1987	3–3 OT	Toronto Maple Leafs (1987–88)	6–10–2
19	W	November 21, 1987	4–1	Vancouver Canucks (1987–88)	7–10–2
20	W	November 25, 1987	4–3 OT	@ Minnesota North Stars (1987–88)	8–10–2
21	L	November 27, 1987	0–6	@ Detroit Red Wings (1987–88)	8–11–2
22	L	November 28, 1987	4–6	Minnesota North Stars (1987–88)	8–12–2

December

Game	Result	Date	Score	Opponent	Record
23	W	December 2, 1987	5–1	Chicago Blackhawks (1987–88)	9–12–2
24	L	December 3, 1987	2–4	@ New Jersey Devils (1987–88)	9–13–2
25	L	December 5, 1987	2–3	New York Rangers (1987–88)	9–14–2
26	T	December 9, 1987	4–4 OT	@ Detroit Red Wings (1987–88)	9–14–3
27	W	December 10, 1987	5–4	@ Minnesota North Stars (1987–88)	10–14–3
28	W	December 12, 1987	5–2	Pittsburgh Penguins (1987–88)	11–14–3
29	T	December 15, 1987	2–2 OT	@ New York Islanders (1987–88)	11–14–4
30	W	December 17, 1987	2–0	@ Hartford Whalers (1987–88)	12–14–4
31	W	December 19, 1987	7–5	@ Boston Bruins (1987–88)	13–14–4
32	T	December 20, 1987	1–1 OT	@ Washington Capitals (1987–88)	13–14–5
33	L	December 23, 1987	1–5	Toronto Maple Leafs (1987–88)	13–15–5
34	W	December 26, 1987	5–4	@ Chicago Blackhawks (1987–88)	14–15–5
35	W	December 27, 1987	3–2	Chicago Blackhawks (1987–88)	15–15–5
36	L	December 30, 1987	2–3	Detroit Red Wings (1987–88)	15–16–5
37	L	December 31, 1987	2–7	@ Detroit Red Wings (1987–88)	15–17–5

January

Game	Result	Date	Score	Opponent	Record
38	W	January 2, 1988	5–3	Calgary Flames (1987–88)	16–17–5
39	L	January 4, 1988	2–6	@ New York Rangers (1987–88)	16–18–5
40	L	January 6, 1988	2–4	@ Detroit Red Wings (1987–88)	16–19–5
41	L	January 7, 1988	4–6	@ Philadelphia Flyers (1987–88)	16–20–5
42	L	January 9, 1988	1–2 OT	Boston Bruins (1987–88)	16–21–5
43	L	January 12, 1988	2–4	Buffalo Sabres (1987–88)	16–22–5
44	W	January 14, 1988	3–2	Hartford Whalers (1987–88)	17–22–5
45	W	January 16, 1988	3–1	Washington Capitals (1987–88)	18–22–5
46	L	January 19, 1988	0–3	@ Winnipeg Jets (1987–88)	18–23–5
47	W	January 21, 1988	4–1	@ Montreal Canadiens (1987–88)	19–23–5
48	W	January 23, 1988	5–3	@ Quebec Nordiques (1987–88)	20–23–5
49	W	January 26, 1988	7–6	Vancouver Canucks (1987–88)	21–23–5
50	W	January 28, 1988	9–1	Minnesota North Stars (1987–88)	22–23–5
51	W	January 30, 1988	5–2	Quebec Nordiques (1987–88)	23–23–5

February

Game	Result	Date	Score	Opponent	Record
52	W	February 1, 1988	5–4	@ Toronto Maple Leafs (1987–88)	24–23–5
53	W	February 3, 1988	2–0	@ Minnesota North Stars (1987–88)	25–23–5
54	L	February 6, 1988	2–4	Philadelphia Flyers (1987–88)	25–24–5
55	L	February 12, 1988	3–4 OT	@ Chicago Blackhawks (1987–88)	25–25–5
56	W	February 13, 1988	5–3	Detroit Red Wings (1987–88)	26–25–5
57	L	February 16, 1988	0–3	Buffalo Sabres (1987–88)	26–26–5
58	W	February 18, 1988	7–4	Los Angeles Kings (1987–88)	27–26–5
59	L	February 20, 1988	3–6	Calgary Flames (1987–88)	27–27–5
60	W	February 21, 1988	5–4	@ Pittsburgh Penguins (1987–88)	28–27–5
61	L	February 23, 1988	4–6	Edmonton Oilers (1987–88)	28–28–5
62	L	February 25, 1988	2–5	@ Buffalo Sabres (1987–88)	28–29–5
63	W	February 27, 1988	6–2	@ Toronto Maple Leafs (1987–88)	29–29–5
64	L	February 29, 1988	2–5	@ New York Rangers (1987–88)	29–30–5

March

Game	Result	Date	Score	Opponent	Record
65	L	March 1, 1988	0–2	@ New York Islanders (1987–88)	29–31–5
66	L	March 3, 1988	2–4	Montreal Canadiens (1987–88)	29–32–5
67	T	March 5, 1988	4–4 OT	Detroit Red Wings (1987–88)	29–32–6
68	W	March 8, 1988	3–2	Toronto Maple Leafs (1987–88)	30–32–6
69	W	March 10, 1988	6–4	Pittsburgh Penguins (1987–88)	31–32–6
70	L	March 13, 1988	6–7	@ Los Angeles Kings (1987–88)	31–33–6
71	T	March 15, 1988	7–7 OT	Chicago Blackhawks (1987–88)	31–33–7
72	T	March 17, 1988	2–2 OT	Minnesota North Stars (1987–88)	31–33–8
73	L	March 19, 1988	3–5	Hartford Whalers (1987–88)	31–34–8
74	W	March 20, 1988	5–2	@ Chicago Blackhawks (1987–88)	32–34–8
75	W	March 22, 1988	5–3	@ Washington Capitals (1987–88)	33–34–8
76	L	March 24, 1988	2–8	New Jersey Devils (1987–88)	33–35–8
77	W	March 26, 1988	3–2 OT	Toronto Maple Leafs (1987–88)	34–35–8
78	L	March 28, 1988	2–7	@ Calgary Flames (1987–88)	34–36–8

April

Game	Result	Date	Score	Opponent	Record
79	L	April 1, 1988	2–5	@ Edmonton Oilers (1987–88)	34–37–8
80	L	April 3, 1988	4–5 OT	@ Winnipeg Jets (1987–88)	34–38–8

Legend: Win (2 points) Loss (0 points) Tie (1 point)

== Playoffs ==
The Blues defeated the Toronto Maple Leafs in five games, in the Norris Division semifinal series. But lost to the Detroit Red Wings in five games, in the Norris Division final series.

== Player statistics ==
=== Regular season ===
Scoring

Player	Pos	GP	G	A	Pts	PIM	+/-	PPG	SHG	GWG
Bernie Federko	C	79	20	69	89	52	-12	9	0	2
Doug Gilmour	C	72	36	50	86	59	-13	19	2	4
Tony McKegney	LW	80	40	38	78	82	10	13	3	1
Mark Hunter	RW	66	32	31	63	136	-6	14	0	0
Tony Hrkac	C	67	11	37	48	22	5	2	1	3
Rob Ramage	D	67	8	34	42	127	-20	5	0	0
Brian Sutter	LW	76	15	22	37	147	-16	4	1	2
Brian Benning	D	77	8	29	37	107	-5	5	0	5
Rick Meagher	C	76	18	16	34	76	0	0	5	3
Gino Cavallini	LW	64	15	17	32	62	-4	2	1	3
Gaston Gingras	D	68	7	22	29	18	0	3	0	0
Herb Raglan	RW	73	10	15	25	190	-10	0	0	2
Robert Nordmark	D	67	3	18	21	60	-6	2	0	0
Perry Turnbull	C	51	10	9	19	82	8	0	0	2
Tim Bothwell	D	78	6	13	19	76	6	0	0	1
Brett Hull	RW	13	6	8	14	4	4	2	0	0
Cliff Ronning	C	26	5	8	13	12	6	1	0	1
Doug Evans	LW	41	5	7	12	49	-7	0	0	1
Paul Cavallini	D	48	4	7	11	86	7	1	0	0
Ron Flockhart	C	21	5	4	9	4	5	0	0	1
Mike Dark	D	30	3	6	9	12	6	0	0	1
Todd Ewen	RW	64	4	2	6	227	-5	0	0	0
Rob Whistle	D	19	3	3	6	6	0	0	0	1
Gordie Roberts	D	11	1	3	4	25	0	0	0	0
Greg Paslawski	RW	17	2	1	3	4	-14	0	0	1
Jocelyn Lemieux	RW	23	1	0	1	42	-5	0	0	0
Charlie Bourgeois	D	30	0	1	1	78	-2	0	0	0
Robert Dirk	D	7	0	1	1	16	0	0	0	0
Ron Handy	LW	4	0	1	1	0	-1	0	0	0
Scott Harlow	LW	1	0	1	1	0	-1	0	0	0
Jim Pavese	D	4	0	1	1	8	-1	0	0	0
Steve Bozek	LW	7	0	0	0	2	-2	0	0	0
Shane MacEachern	C	1	0	0	0	0	0	0	0	0
Darrell May	G	3	0	0	0	0	0	0	0	0
Greg Millen	G	48	0	0	0	4	0	0	0	0
Bill Root	D	9	0	0	0	6	-7	0	0	0
Larry Trader	D	1	0	0	0	2	-1	0	0	0
Rick Wamsley	G	31	0	0	0	14	0	0	0	0

Goaltending

Player	MIN	GP	W	L	T	GA	GAA	SO	SA	SV	SV%
Greg Millen	2854	48	21	19	7	167	3.51	1	1396	1229	.880
Rick Wamsley	1818	31	13	16	1	103	3.40	2	922	819	.888
Darrell May	180	3	0	3	0	18	6.00	0	107	89	.832
Team:	4852	80	34	38	8	288	3.56	3	2425	2137	.881

=== Playoffs ===
Scoring

Player	Pos	GP	G	A	Pts	PIM	+/-	PPG	SHG	GWG
Doug Gilmour	C	10	3	14	17	18	3	1	0	0
Gino Cavallini	LW	10	5	5	10	19	3	2	0	0
Brett Hull	RW	10	7	2	9	4	1	4	0	3
Tony McKegney	LW	9	3	6	9	8	-3	1	0	1
Bernie Federko	C	10	2	6	8	18	-6	2	0	0
Tony Hrkac	C	10	6	1	7	4	1	3	1	1
Brian Benning	D	10	1	6	7	25	-7	1	0	0
Paul Cavallini	D	10	1	6	7	26	5	0	1	0
Mark Hunter	RW	5	2	3	5	24	-4	1	0	0
Gaston Gingras	D	10	1	3	4	4	-1	0	0	0
Herb Raglan	RW	10	1	3	4	11	-1	0	0	0
Gordie Roberts	D	10	1	2	3	33	0	0	0	0
Brian Sutter	LW	10	0	3	3	49	-4	0	0	0
Steve Bozek	LW	7	1	1	2	6	-3	0	0	0
Greg Paslawski	RW	3	1	1	2	2	-1	1	0	0
Tim Bothwell	D	10	0	1	1	18	-9	0	0	0
Robert Dirk	D	6	0	1	1	2	1	0	0	0
Kent Carlson	D	3	0	0	0	2	-2	0	0	0
Doug Evans	LW	2	0	0	0	0	1	0	0	0
Todd Ewen	RW	6	0	0	0	21	-1	0	0	0
Jocelyn Lemieux	RW	5	0	0	0	15	-1	0	0	0
Rick Meagher	C	10	0	0	0	8	-5	0	0	0
Greg Millen	G	10	0	0	0	2	0	0	0	0
Perry Turnbull	C	1	0	0	0	2	0	0	0	0
Rob Whistle	D	1	0	0	0	0	0	0	0	0

Goaltending

Player	MIN	GP	W	L	GA	GAA	SO	SA	SV	SV%
Greg Millen	600	10	5	5	38	3.80	0	252	214	.849
Team:	600	10	5	5	38	3.80	0	252	214	.849

Note:

Pos = Position;GP = Games played; G = Goals; A = Assists; Pts = Points; PIM = Penalty minutes; +/- = Plus/minus; PPG = Power-play goals; SHG = Short-handed goals; GWG = Game-winning goals
Pos = Position;GP = Games played; Min, TOI = Minutes played; W = Wins; L = Losses; T,T/OT = Ties; OTL = Overtime losses; GA = Goals-against; GAA = Goals-against average; SO = Shutouts; SA = Shots against; SV = Shots saved;SV% = Save percentage;

== Draft picks ==
St. Louis's draft picks at the 1987 NHL entry draft held at the Joe Louis Arena in Detroit, Michigan. The Blues attempted to select Tim Foley in the second round of the 1987 NHL supplemental draft, but the claim was ruled invalid since Foley entered school after age 20 and therefore did not meet eligibility requirements.

Round	#	Player	Nationality	College/Junior/Club team (League)
1	12	Keith Osborne	Canada	North Bay Centennials (OHL)
3	54	Kevin Miehm	Canada	Oshawa Generals (OHL)
3	59	Robert Nordmark	Sweden	Lulea HF (Sweden)
4	75	Darin Smith	Canada	North Bay Centennials (OHL)
4	82	Andy Rymsha	Canada	Western Michigan University (CCHA)
6	117	Rob Robinson	Canada	Miami University (CCHA)
7	138	Todd Crabtree	United States	Governor Dummer Academy (USHS-MA)
8	159	Guy Hebert	United States	Hamilton College (NESCAC)
9	180	Rob Dumas	Canada	Seattle Thunderbirds (WHL)
10	201	David Marvin	United States	Warroad High School (USHS-MN)
10	207	Andy Cesarski	United States	Culver Military Academy (USHS-IN)
11	222	Daniel Rolfe	Canada	Brockville Braves (OPJHL)
12	243	Ray Savard	Canada	Regina Pats (WHL)

== See also ==
- 1987–88 NHL season
