= 1987–88 Detroit Red Wings season =

Sports season

1987–88 Detroit Red Wings
- Norris Division champions
- Division: 1st Norris
- Conference: 3rd Campbell
- 1987–88 record: 41–28–11
- Home record: 24–10–6
- Road record: 17–18–5
- Goals for: 322
- Goals against: 269

Team information
- General manager: Jim Devellano
- Coach: Jacques Demers
- Captain: Steve Yzerman
- Alternate captains: Gerard Gallant; Mike O'Connell
- Arena: Joe Louis Arena

Team leaders
- Goals: Steve Yzerman (50)
- Assists: Steve Yzerman (52)
- Points: Steve Yzerman (102)
- Penalty minutes: Bob Probert (398)
- Wins: Glen Hanlon (22)
- Goals against average: Greg Stefan (3.11)

The 1987–88 Detroit Red Wings season was the Red Wings' 56th season, the franchise's 62nd.

Coached by Jacques Demers, the team compiled a record of 41–28–11 for 93 points, to finish first place in the Norris Division at the end of the regular season for the first time since 1965, and earned their first winning season since 1973. Luckily for them, the division was weak that year; they were the only team in their division to have a winning record that season. In the playoffs, they won their Norris Division Semifinal series 4–2 over the Toronto Maple Leafs, and they followed that with a 5-game win over the St. Louis Blues in the Norris Division Final. As was the case in the previous season, they lost in the conference final to the eventual Stanley Cup champion Edmonton Oilers in five games.

== Regular season ==
=== Final standings ===
Norris Division
	GP	W	L	T	GF	GA	Pts
**Detroit Red Wings**	80	41	28	11	322	269	93
**St. Louis Blues**	80	34	38	8	278	294	76
**Chicago Blackhawks**	80	30	41	9	284	328	69
**Toronto Maple Leafs**	80	21	49	10	273	345	52
Minnesota North Stars	80	19	48	13	242	349	51

Note: GP = Games played, W = Wins, L = Losses, T = Ties, Pts = Points, GF = Goals for, GA = Goals against
Note: Teams that qualified for the playoffs are highlighted in bold.

=== Record vs. opponents ===
Norris Division record vs. opponents

==== Vs. Campbell Conference ====
**Vs. Norris Division**

1987–88 NHL records
Team	**CHI**	**DET**	**MIN**	**STL**	**TOR**	**Total**
Chicago	—	3–5	5–2–1	3–4–1	5–3	**16–14–2**
Detroit	5–3	—	4–3–1	4–1–3	3–3–2	**16–10–6**
Minnesota	2–5–1	3–4–1	—	2–5–1	4–1–3	**11–15–6**
St. Louis	4–3–1	1–4–3	5–2–1	—	6–1–1	**16–10–6**
Toronto	3–5	3–3–2	1–4–3	1–6–1	—	**8–18–6**

**Vs. Smythe Division**

1987–88 NHL records
Team	**CGY**	**EDM**	**LAK**	**VAN**	**WIN**	**Total**
Chicago	0–2–1	2–1	1–2	2–1	1–1–1	**6–7–2**
Detroit	1–1–1	2–1	2–1	2–1	2–0–1	**9–4–2**
Minnesota	0–2–1	0–2–1	0–3	1–2	0–2–1	**1–11–3**
St. Louis	1–2	0–3	1–2	2–1	1–2	**5–10–0**
Toronto	0–3	0–2–1	1–1–1	1–1–1	1–2	**3–9–3**

**Vs. Wales Conference**

**Vs. Adams Division**

1987–88 NHL records
Team	**BOS**	**BUF**	**HFD**	**MTL**	**QUE**	**Total**
Chicago	0–3	1–2	1–2	0–2–1	0–2–1	**2–11–2**
Detroit	2–1	2–1	1–2	1–2	0–3	**6–9–0**
Minnesota	0–3	1–1–1	0–3	1–1–1	1–2	**3–10–2**
St. Louis	2–1	0–3	2–1	1–2	2–1	**7–8–0**
Toronto	1–2	0–3	0–3	0–3	0–3	**1–14–0**

**Vs. Patrick Division**

1987–88 NHL records
Team	**NJD**	**NYI**	**NYR**	**PHI**	**PIT**	**WSH**	**Total**
Chicago	0–3	1–0–2	0–2–1	3–0	1–2	1–2	**6–9–3**
Detroit	3–0	2–1	1–1–1	0–2–1	2–1	2–0–1	**10–5–3**
Minnesota	0–3	1–1–1	1–2	1–2	1–2	0–2–1	**4–12–2**
St. Louis	0–3	0–2–1	0–3	1–2	3–0	2–0–1	**6–10–2**
Toronto	1–2	3–0	1–2	2–1	1–2	1–1–1	**9–8–1**

== Schedule and results ==
1987–88 regular season
October

Game	Result	Date	Score	Opponent	Record
1	L	October 8, 1987	1–5	@ Calgary Flames (1987–88)	0–1–0
2	W	October 9, 1987	4–1	@ Edmonton Oilers (1987–88)	1–1–0
3	W	October 12, 1987	3–2	@ Vancouver Canucks (1987–88)	2–1–0
4	W	October 16, 1987	3–2	Toronto Maple Leafs (1987–88)	3–1–0
5	L	October 17, 1987	4–7	@ Toronto Maple Leafs (1987–88)	3–2–0
6	L	October 21, 1987	1–5	Chicago Blackhawks (1987–88)	3–3–0
7	W	October 23, 1987	5–2	Pittsburgh Penguins (1987–88)	4–3–0
8	W	October 28, 1987	5–1	@ Winnipeg Jets (1987–88)	5–3–0
9	L	October 30, 1987	4–5	Montreal Canadiens (1987–88)	5–4–0
10	T	October 31, 1987	3–3 OT	@ St. Louis Blues (1987–88)	5–4–1

November

Game	Result	Date	Score	Opponent	Record
11	T	November 3, 1987	2–2 OT	Minnesota North Stars (1987–88)	5–4–2
12	L	November 4, 1987	4–7	@ Minnesota North Stars (1987–88)	5–5–2
13	W	November 6, 1987	3–1	Hartford Whalers (1987–88)	6–5–2
14	L	November 7, 1987	3–4 OT	@ New York Islanders (1987–88)	6–6–2
15	L	November 11, 1987	3–6	@ Chicago Blackhawks (1987–88)	6–7–2
16	W	November 14, 1987	6–4	@ New Jersey Devils (1987–88)	7–7–2
17	W	November 17, 1987	1–0	@ Washington Capitals (1987–88)	8–7–2
18	L	November 19, 1987	1–4	Vancouver Canucks (1987–88)	8–8–2
19	L	November 22, 1987	0–1	Boston Bruins (1987–88)	8–9–2
20	W	November 25, 1987	10–8	Winnipeg Jets (1987–88)	9–9–2
21	W	November 27, 1987	6–0	St. Louis Blues (1987–88)	10–9–2
22	W	November 28, 1987	3–2 OT	@ Boston Bruins (1987–88)	11–9–2

December

Game	Result	Date	Score	Opponent	Record
23	W	December 2, 1987	7–4	Edmonton Oilers (1987–88)	12–9–2
24	W	December 4, 1987	12–0	Chicago Blackhawks (1987–88)	13–9–2
25	L	December 7, 1987	4–5 OT	@ Toronto Maple Leafs (1987–88)	13–10–2
26	T	December 9, 1987	4–4 OT	St. Louis Blues (1987–88)	13–10–3
27	T	December 11, 1987	3–3 OT	Philadelphia Flyers (1987–88)	13–10–4
28	L	December 12, 1987	3–5	@ Montreal Canadiens (1987–88)	13–11–4
29	L	December 14, 1987	3–4	@ New York Rangers (1987–88)	13–12–4
30	W	December 16, 1987	6–1	Washington Capitals (1987–88)	14–12–4
31	W	December 18, 1987	8–3	Minnesota North Stars (1987–88)	15–12–4
32	L	December 20, 1987	2–4	@ Quebec Nordiques (1987–88)	15–13–4
33	L	December 23, 1987	2–5	Buffalo Sabres (1987–88)	15–14–4
34	L	December 26, 1987	3–6	@ Pittsburgh Penguins (1987–88)	15–15–4
35	L	December 27, 1987	4–5	@ Minnesota North Stars (1987–88)	15–16–4
36	W	December 30, 1987	3–2	@ St. Louis Blues (1987–88)	16–16–4
37	W	December 31, 1987	7–2	St. Louis Blues (1987–88)	17–16–4

January

Game	Result	Date	Score	Opponent	Record
38	T	January 3, 1988	4–4 OT	@ Winnipeg Jets (1987–88)	17–16–5
39	W	January 6, 1988	4–2	St. Louis Blues (1987–88)	18–16–5
40	W	January 8, 1988	5–3	Los Angeles Kings (1987–88)	19–16–5
41	W	January 10, 1988	7–5	Pittsburgh Penguins (1987–88)	20–16–5
42	W	January 13, 1988	7–4	@ New York Rangers (1987–88)	21–16–5
43	W	January 15, 1988	2–1	Minnesota North Stars (1987–88)	22–16–5
44	L	January 16, 1988	2–4	@ Minnesota North Stars (1987–88)	22–17–5
45	W	January 18, 1988	4–3	Toronto Maple Leafs (1987–88)	23–17–5
46	W	January 21, 1988	3–2 OT	@ New Jersey Devils (1987–88)	24–17–5
47	T	January 23, 1988	4–4 OT	Calgary Flames (1987–88)	24–17–6
48	L	January 24, 1988	1–2 OT	@ Hartford Whalers (1987–88)	24–18–6
49	L	January 26, 1988	4–6	Chicago Blackhawks (1987–88)	24–19–6
50	T	January 29, 1988	3–3 OT	Toronto Maple Leafs (1987–88)	24–19–7
51	T	January 30, 1988	5–5 OT	@ Toronto Maple Leafs (1987–88)	24–19–8

February

Game	Result	Date	Score	Opponent	Record
52	W	February 3, 1988	6–4	@ Chicago Blackhawks (1987–88)	25–19–8
53	W	February 5, 1988	5–1	Calgary Flames (1987–88)	26–19–8
54	W	February 6, 1988	5–4	@ Montreal Canadiens (1987–88)	27–19–8
55	W	February 12, 1988	4–3	New Jersey Devils (1987–88)	28–19–8
56	L	February 13, 1988	3–5	@ St. Louis Blues (1987–88)	28–20–8
57	W	February 15, 1988	6–1	@ Los Angeles Kings (1987–88)	29–20–8
58	W	February 17, 1988	4–3	@ Chicago Blackhawks (1987–88)	30–20–8
59	W	February 20, 1988	6–1	Chicago Blackhawks (1987–88)	31–20–8
60	L	February 21, 1988	3–5	@ Philadelphia Flyers (1987–88)	31–21–8
61	L	February 23, 1988	6–11	Philadelphia Flyers (1987–88)	31–22–8
62	L	February 26, 1988	2–3	Quebec Nordiques (1987–88)	31–23–8
63	L	February 27, 1988	4–5	@ Quebec Nordiques (1987–88)	31–24–8

March

Game	Result	Date	Score	Opponent	Record
64	W	March 1, 1988	4–0	Buffalo Sabres (1987–88)	32–24–8
65	W	March 3, 1988	6–3	Minnesota North Stars (1987–88)	33–24–8
66	T	March 5, 1988	4–4 OT	@ St. Louis Blues (1987–88)	33–24–9
67	W	March 6, 1988	4–3	@ Chicago Blackhawks (1987–88)	34–24–9
68	W	March 8, 1988	2–0	Boston Bruins (1987–88)	35–24–9
69	W	March 10, 1988	5–2	Vancouver Canucks (1987–88)	36–24–9
70	W	March 12, 1988	4–3	@ New York Islanders (1987–88)	37–24–9
71	W	March 13, 1988	5–1	New York Islanders (1987–88)	38–24–9
72	W	March 16, 1988	2–1	@ Minnesota North Stars (1987–88)	39–24–9
73	L	March 19, 1988	4–7	@ Los Angeles Kings (1987–88)	39–25–9
74	L	March 22, 1988	4–6	Edmonton Oilers (1987–88)	39–26–9
75	L	March 24, 1988	2–3	Hartford Whalers (1987–88)	39–27–9
76	T	March 26, 1988	4–4 OT	New York Rangers (1987–88)	39–27–10
77	W	March 27, 1988	5–3	@ Buffalo Sabres (1987–88)	40–27–10
78	T	March 29, 1988	2–2 OT	@ Washington Capitals (1987–88)	40–27–11

April

Game	Result	Date	Score	Opponent	Record
79	W	April 1, 1988	7–3	Toronto Maple Leafs (1987–88)	41–27–11
80	L	April 2, 1988	3–5	@ Toronto Maple Leafs (1987–88)	41–28–11

Legend: Win (2 points) Loss (0 points) Tie (1 point)

== Playoffs ==
The Red Wings won the Norris Division title, their first division title since the 1964–65 season. They went up against the Toronto Maple Leafs in the Norris Division semifinals, and won the series in six games. They next faced the St. Louis Blues in the Norris Division Final and won in five games. The Red Wings then faced the Edmonton Oilers in the Campbell Conference Final for the second year in a row. Just like the year before, the Oilers beat the Red Wings in five games on their way to their fourth Stanley Cup championship in five years.

== Player statistics ==
= Indicates team leader

= Indicates league leader

=== Regular season ===
Scoring

Player	Pos	GP	G	A	Pts	PIM	+/-	PPG	SHG	GWG
Steve Yzerman	C	64	50	52	102	44	30	10	6	6
Gerard Gallant	LW	73	34	39	73	242	24	10	0	3
Petr Klima	W	78	37	25	62	46	4	6	5	5
Bob Probert	LW	74	29	33	62	398	16	15	0	5
John Chabot	C	78	13	44	57	10	12	0	2	0
Adam Oates	C	63	14	40	54	20	16	3	0	3
Brent Ashton	LW	73	26	27	53	50	10	7	2	3
Shawn Burr	LW/C	78	17	23	40	97	7	5	3	3
Dave Barr	RW	51	14	26	40	58	20	3	1	0
Darren Veitch	D	63	7	33	40	45	11	4	0	1
Jeff Sharples	D	56	10	25	35	42	13	2	0	0
Lee Norwood	D	51	9	22	31	131	4	3	0	2
Doug Halward	D	70	5	21	26	130	6	3	0	1
Tim Higgins	RW	62	12	13	25	94	5	0	1	1
Joe Murphy	RW	50	10	9	19	37	-4	1	0	2
Mike O'Connell	D	48	6	13	19	38	24	0	0	0
Mel Bridgman	C	57	6	11	17	42	4	0	0	1
Rick Zombo	D	62	3	14	17	96	24	0	0	2
Joe Kocur	RW	63	7	7	14	263	-11	0	0	1
Jim Nill	RW	36	3	11	14	55	2	0	0	0
Steve Chiasson	D	29	2	9	11	57	15	0	0	0
Gilbert Delorme	D	55	2	8	10	81	9	0	0	0
Harold Snepsts	D	31	1	4	5	67	3	0	0	0
Jim Pavese	D	7	0	3	3	21	3	0	0	0
Dale Krentz	LW	6	2	0	2	5	2	0	0	1
Doug Houda	D	11	1	1	2	10	0	0	0	0
Steve Martinson	LW	10	1	1	2	84	3	0	0	1
Mark Kumpel	RW	13	0	2	2	4	0	0	0	0
Kris King	LW	3	1	0	1	2	1	0	0	0
Murray Eaves	C	7	0	1	1	2	-1	0	0	0
Brent Fedyk	LW	2	0	1	1	2	-1	0	0	0
Adam Graves	LW	9	0	1	1	8	-2	0	0	0
Glen Hanlon	G	47	0	1	1	30	0	0	0	0
Greg Stefan	G	33	0	1	1	36	0	0	0	0
Darren Eliot	G	3	0	0	0	2	0	0	0	0
Dave Lewis	D	6	0	0	0	18	-3	0	0	0
Sam St. Laurent	G	6	0	0	0	2	0	0	0	0

Goaltending

Player	MIN	GP	W	L	T	GA	GAA	SO	SA	SV	SV%
Glen Hanlon	2623	47	22	17	5	141	3.23	4	1292	1151	.891
Greg Stefan	1854	33	17	9	5	96	3.11	1	923	827	.896
Sam St. Laurent	294	6	2	2	0	16	3.27	0	148	132	.892
Darren Eliot	97	3	0	0	1	9	5.57	0	56	47	.839
Team:	4868	80	41	28	11	262	3.23	5	2419	2157	.892

=== Playoffs ===
Scoring

Player	Pos	GP	G	A	Pts	PIM	PPG	SHG	GWG
Bob Probert	LW	16	8	13	21	51	5	0	1
Adam Oates	C	16	8	12	20	6	4	0	1
John Chabot	C	16	4	15	19	2	1	0	0
Petr Klima	W	12	10	8	18	10	2	1	4
Gerard Gallant	LW	16	6	9	15	55	1	0	1
Brent Ashton	LW	16	7	5	12	10	2	1	0
Dave Barr	RW	16	5	7	12	22	2	0	0
Lee Norwood	D	16	2	6	8	40	2	0	0
Jim Nill	RW	16	6	1	7	62	0	1	0
Darren Veitch	D	11	1	5	6	6	1	0	0
Rick Zombo	D	16	0	6	6	55	0	0	0
Mel Bridgman	C	16	4	1	5	12	0	0	0
Doug Halward	D	8	1	4	5	18	0	0	0
Shawn Burr	LW/C	9	3	1	4	14	0	0	1
Steve Chiasson	D	9	2	2	4	31	1	0	0
Steve Yzerman	C	3	1	3	4	6	0	0	0
Mike O'Connell	D	10	0	4	4	8	0	0	0
Gilbert Delorme	D	15	0	3	3	22	0	0	0
Jeff Sharples	D	4	0	3	3	4	0	0	0
Tim Higgins	RW	13	1	0	1	26	0	0	1
Joe Kocur	RW	10	0	1	1	13	0	0	0
Joe Murphy	RW	8	0	1	1	6	0	0	0
Jim Pavese	D	4	0	1	1	15	0	0	0
Greg Stefan	G	10	0	1	1	0	0	0	0
Glen Hanlon	G	8	0	0	0	0	0	0	0
Dale Krentz	LW	2	0	0	0	0	0	0	0
Harold Snepsts	D	10	0	0	0	40	0	0	0
Sam St. Laurent	G	1	0	0	0	0	0	0	0

Goaltending

Player	MIN	GP	W	L	GA	GAA	SO	SA	SV	SV%
Greg Stefan	531	10	5	4	32	3.62	1	236	204	.864
Glen Hanlon	431	8	4	3	22	3.06	1	171	149	.871
Sam St. Laurent	10	1	0	0	1	6.00	0	7	6	.857
Team:	972	16	9	7	55	3.40	2	414	359	.867

Note: GP = Games played; G = Goals; A = Assists; Pts = Points; +/- = Plus-minus PIM = Penalty minutes; PPG = Power-play goals; SHG = Short-handed goals; GWG = Game-winning goals;
MIN = Minutes played; W = Wins; L = Losses; T = Ties; GA = Goals against; GAA = Goals-against average; SO = Shutouts; SA=Shots against; SV=Shots saved; SV% = Save percentage;

== Draft picks ==
Detroit's draft picks at the 1987 NHL entry draft held at the Joe Louis Arena in Detroit, Michigan.

Round	#	Player	Nationality	College/Junior/Club team (League)
1	11	Yves Racine	Canada	Longueuil Chevaliers (QMJHL)
2	32	Gord Kruppke	Canada	Prince Albert Raiders (WHL)
2	41	Bob Wilkie	Canada	Swift Current Broncos (WHL)
3	52	Dennis Holland	Canada	Portland Winter Hawks (WHL)
4	74	Mark Reimer	Canada	Saskatoon Blades (WHL)
5	95	Radomir Brazda	Czechoslovakia	LTC Pardubice (Czechoslovakia)
6	116	Sean Clifford	Canada	Ohio State University (CCHA)
7	137	Mike Gober	United States	Laval Titan (QMJHL)
8	158	Kevin Scott	Canada	Vernon Lakers (BCJHL)
9	179	Mikko Haapakoski	Finland	Karpat (Finland)
10	200	Darin Banister	Canada	University of Illinois at Chicago (CCHA)
11	221	Craig Quinlan	United States	Hill-Murray School (USHS-MN)
12	242	Tomas Jansson	Sweden	Södertälje SK (Sweden)
S2	13	Mike LaMoine	United States	University of North Dakota (WCHA)

== See also ==
- 1987–88 NHL season
