= 1987–88 New York Islanders season =

NHL hockey team season

1987–88 New York Islanders
- Patrick Division champions
- Division: 1st Patrick
- Conference: 3rd Wales
- 1987–88 record: 39–31–10
- Home record: 24–10–6
- Road record: 15–21–4
- Goals for: 308
- Goals against: 267

Team information
- General manager: Bill Torrey
- Coach: Terry Simpson
- Captain: Brent Sutter
- Alternate captains: Bryan Trottier; Steve Konroyd
- Arena: Nassau Coliseum

Team leaders
- Goals: Pat LaFontaine (47)
- Assists: Bryan Trottier (52)
- Points: Pat LaFontaine (92)
- Penalty minutes: Alan Kerr (198)
- Wins: Kelly Hrudey (22)
- Goals against average: Billy Smith (3.22)

The 1987–88 New York Islanders season was the 16th season for the franchise in the National Hockey League (NHL). The team improved on its performance from the previous season. They finished with 88 points, which turned out to be good enough for first place in a tightly contested Patrick Division – the Islanders, despite winning the division, finished only seven points ahead of the last place Pittsburgh Penguins. The Islanders were subsequently eliminated in the first round of the Stanley Cup playoffs by the New Jersey Devils.

As of 2025, this remains the Islanders' most recent division title, the second longest active drought in the NHL.

== Off-season ==
Denis Potvin resigns the team captaincy, before playing his last season. Forward Brent Sutter is named team captain.

== Regular season ==
=== Final standings ===
Patrick Division
	GP	W	L	T	GF	GA	Pts
**New York Islanders**	80	39	31	10	308	267	88
**Philadelphia Flyers**	80	38	33	9	292	292	85
**Washington Capitals**	80	38	33	9	281	249	85
**New Jersey Devils**	80	38	36	6	295	296	82
New York Rangers	80	36	34	10	300	283	82
Pittsburgh Penguins	80	36	35	9	319	316	81

Note: GP = Games played, W = Wins, L = Losses, T = Ties, Pts = Points, GF = Goals for, GA = Goals against
Note: Teams that qualified for the playoffs are highlighted in bold.

=== Record vs. opponents ===
Patrick Division record vs. opponents

==== Vs. Wales Conference ====
**Vs. Patrick Division**

1987–88 NHL records
Team	**NJD**	**NYI**	**NYR**	**PHI**	**PIT**	**WSH**	**Total**
New Jersey	—	3–4	3–4	5–0–2	6–1	2–5	19–14–2
N.Y. Islanders	4–3	—	2–2–3	3–3–1	2–4–1	4–2–1	15–14–6
N.Y. Rangers	4–3	2–2–3	—	3–3–1	2–3–2	2–5	13–16–6
Philadelphia	0–5–2	3–3–1	3–3–1	—	5–2	2–4–1	13–17–5
Pittsburgh	1–6	4–2–1	3–2–2	2–5	—	5–1–1	15–16–4
Washington	5–2	2–4–1	5–2	4–2–1	1–5–1	—	17–15–3

**Vs. Adams Division**

1987–88 NHL records
Team	**BOS**	**BUF**	**HFD**	**MTL**	**QUE**	**Total**
New Jersey	1–2	0–2–1	1–1–1	2–1	0–3	4–9–2
N.Y. Islanders	2–1	2–1	2–1	0–3	2–1	8–7–0
N.Y. Rangers	2–1	0–3	2–1	1–1–1	2–1	7–7–1
Philadelphia	2–1	3–0	2–1	0–1–2	2–0–1	9–3–3
Pittsburgh	0–2–1	2–0–1	2–1	2–1	3–0	9–4–2
Washington	2–1	0–2–1	2–1	1–1–1	2–1	7–6–2

==== Vs. Campbell Conference ====
**Vs. Norris Division**

1987–88 NHL records
Team	**CHI**	**DET**	**MIN**	**STL**	**TOR**	**Total**
New Jersey	3–0	0–3	3–0	3–0	2–1	11–4–0
N.Y. Islanders	0–1–2	1–2	1–1–1	2–0–1	0–3	4–7–4
N.Y. Rangers	2–0–1	1–1–1	2–1	3–0	2–1	10–3–2
Philadelphia	0–3	2–0–1	2–1	2–1	1–2	7–7–1
Pittsburgh	2–1	1–2	2–1	0–3	2–1	7–8–0
Washington	2–1	0–2–1	2–0–1	0–2–1	1–1–1	5–6–4

**Vs. Smythe Division**

1987–88 NHL records
Team	**CGY**	**EDM**	**LAK**	**VAN**	**WIN**	**Total**
New Jersey	1–2	2–1	1–1–1	0–3	0–2–1	4–9–2
N.Y. Islanders	2–1	2–1	3–0	3–0	2–1	12–3–0
N.Y. Rangers	1–2	1–2	0–3	2–1	2–0–1	6–8–1
Philadelphia	0–3	1–2	3–0	2–1	3–0	9–6–0
Pittsburgh	2–0–1	0–3	1–0–2	1–2	1–2	5–7–3
Washington	1–2	2–1	2–1	3–0	1–2	9–6–0

== Schedule and results ==
1987–88 regular season
October

Game	Result	Date	Score	Opponent	Record
1	W	October 8, 1987	4–1	@ Los Angeles Kings (1987–88)	1–0–0
2	W	October 10, 1987	7–1	@ Vancouver Canucks (1987–88)	2–0–0
3	W	October 15, 1987	6–0	@ Philadelphia Flyers (1987–88)	3–0–0
4	L	October 17, 1987	3–4	Philadelphia Flyers (1987–88)	3–1–0
5	W	October 20, 1987	5–4	Calgary Flames (1987–88)	4–1–0
6	L	October 23, 1987	3–5	@ New Jersey Devils (1987–88)	4–2–0
7	W	October 24, 1987	2–1	New Jersey Devils (1987–88)	5–2–0
8	T	October 27, 1987	4–4 OT	Chicago Blackhawks (1987–88)	5–2–1
9	L	October 28, 1987	2–5	@ Toronto Maple Leafs (1987–88)	5–3–1
10	W	October 31, 1987	8–2	New York Rangers (1987–88)	6–3–1

November

Game	Result	Date	Score	Opponent	Record
11	W	November 1, 1987	6–5 OT	@ Boston Bruins (1987–88)	7–3–1
12	W	November 3, 1987	6–3	New Jersey Devils (1987–88)	8–3–1
13	L	November 5, 1987	2–4	Pittsburgh Penguins (1987–88)	8–4–1
14	W	November 7, 1987	4–3 OT	Detroit Red Wings (1987–88)	9–4–1
15	W	November 10, 1987	4–3 OT	Washington Capitals (1987–88)	10–4–1
16	W	November 12, 1987	4–3	@ St. Louis Blues (1987–88)	11–4–1
17	W	November 14, 1987	7–3	Winnipeg Jets (1987–88)	12–4–1
18	W	November 17, 1987	4–3	Los Angeles Kings (1987–88)	13–4–1
19	L	November 18, 1987	2–5	@ Montreal Canadiens (1987–88)	13–5–1
20	W	November 21, 1987	6–4	@ Philadelphia Flyers (1987–88)	14–5–1
21	L	November 24, 1987	3–4	Toronto Maple Leafs (1987–88)	14–6–1
22	W	November 28, 1987	5–4	New York Rangers (1987–88)	15–6–1
23	L	November 29, 1987	1–3	@ New York Rangers (1987–88)	15–7–1

December

Game	Result	Date	Score	Opponent	Record
24	W	December 2, 1987	7–1	@ Pittsburgh Penguins (1987–88)	16–7–1
25	W	December 4, 1987	6–4	@ Washington Capitals (1987–88)	17–7–1
26	L	December 8, 1987	2–3	Montreal Canadiens (1987–88)	17–8–1
27	L	December 11, 1987	4–6	@ Pittsburgh Penguins (1987–88)	17–9–1
28	W	December 12, 1987	5–3	New Jersey Devils (1987–88)	18–9–1
29	T	December 15, 1987	2–2 OT	St. Louis Blues (1987–88)	18–9–2
30	L	December 17, 1987	3–4	@ Philadelphia Flyers (1987–88)	18–10–2
31	L	December 19, 1987	4–5	Philadelphia Flyers (1987–88)	18–11–2
32	L	December 22, 1987	2–5	@ Winnipeg Jets (1987–88)	18–12–2
33	L	December 23, 1987	5–7	@ Chicago Blackhawks (1987–88)	18–13–2
34	W	December 26, 1987	2–1	Boston Bruins (1987–88)	19–13–2
35	L	December 28, 1987	4–6	@ New Jersey Devils (1987–88)	19–14–2
36	T	December 29, 1987	3–3 OT	New York Rangers (1987–88)	19–14–3

January

Game	Result	Date	Score	Opponent	Record
37	W	January 2, 1988	3–2	Pittsburgh Penguins (1987–88)	20–14–3
38	T	January 5, 1988	3–3 OT	Minnesota North Stars (1987–88)	20–14–4
39	L	January 8, 1988	4–7	@ Calgary Flames (1987–88)	20–15–4
40	L	January 9, 1988	1–5	@ Edmonton Oilers (1987–88)	20–16–4
41	T	January 12, 1988	5–5 OT	@ Pittsburgh Penguins (1987–88)	20–16–5
42	W	January 14, 1988	8–5	Quebec Nordiques (1987–88)	21–16–5
43	W	January 16, 1988	4–2	New Jersey Devils (1987–88)	22–16–5
44	L	January 17, 1988	2–5	@ Buffalo Sabres (1987–88)	22–17–5
45	L	January 19, 1988	4–6	Pittsburgh Penguins (1987–88)	22–18–5
46	L	January 21, 1988	3–4	@ Hartford Whalers (1987–88)	22–19–5
47	W	January 23, 1988	3–2	Edmonton Oilers (1987–88)	23–19–5
48	L	January 27, 1988	1–2	@ Minnesota North Stars (1987–88)	23–20–5
49	W	January 29, 1988	5–2	@ Buffalo Sabres (1987–88)	24–20–5
50	L	January 30, 1988	2–6	Montreal Canadiens (1987–88)	24–21–5

February

Game	Result	Date	Score	Opponent	Record
51	T	February 2, 1988	2–2 OT	New York Rangers (1987–88)	24–21–6
52	W	February 5, 1988	4–2	@ Washington Capitals (1987–88)	25–21–6
53	W	February 6, 1988	6–4	Buffalo Sabres (1987–88)	26–21–6
54	L	February 11, 1988	3–4	@ Toronto Maple Leafs (1987–88)	26–22–6
55	L	February 12, 1988	2–6	@ Washington Capitals (1987–88)	26–23–6
56	T	February 14, 1988	4–4 OT	@ New York Rangers (1987–88)	26–23–7
57	W	February 16, 1988	9–3	Calgary Flames (1987–88)	27–23–7
58	T	February 18, 1988	3–3 OT	@ Philadelphia Flyers (1987–88)	27–23–8
59	W	February 20, 1988	3–0	Hartford Whalers (1987–88)	28–23–8
60	W	February 21, 1988	7–2	@ Hartford Whalers (1987–88)	29–23–8
61	W	February 23, 1988	6–1	Vancouver Canucks (1987–88)	30–23–8
62	T	February 25, 1988	1–1 OT	Chicago Blackhawks (1987–88)	30–23–9
63	L	February 27, 1988	0–3	Washington Capitals (1987–88)	30–24–9

March

Game	Result	Date	Score	Opponent	Record
64	W	March 1, 1988	2–0	St. Louis Blues (1987–88)	31–24–9
65	L	March 2, 1988	1–3	@ New York Rangers (1987–88)	31–25–9
66	L	March 5, 1988	3–8	@ Pittsburgh Penguins (1987–88)	31–26–9
67	W	March 6, 1988	2–0	@ Quebec Nordiques (1987–88)	32–26–9
68	W	March 8, 1988	7–4	Vancouver Canucks (1987–88)	33–26–9
69	L	March 10, 1988	3–4	Quebec Nordiques (1987–88)	33–27–9
70	L	March 12, 1988	3–4	Detroit Red Wings (1987–88)	33–28–9
71	L	March 13, 1988	1–5	@ Detroit Red Wings (1987–88)	33–29–9
72	T	March 18, 1988	3–3 OT	@ Washington Capitals (1987–88)	33–29–10
73	W	March 20, 1988	6–0	@ Winnipeg Jets (1987–88)	34–29–10
74	W	March 21, 1988	5–1	@ Minnesota North Stars (1987–88)	35–29–10
75	W	March 23, 1988	6–2	@ Los Angeles Kings (1987–88)	36–29–10
76	W	March 26, 1988	5–4	Edmonton Oilers (1987–88)	37–29–10
77	W	March 29, 1988	5–3	Philadelphia Flyers (1987–88)	38–29–10
78	W	March 31, 1988	7–3	Washington Capitals (1987–88)	39–29–10

April

Game	Result	Date	Score	Opponent	Record
79	L	April 2, 1988	2–5	@ New Jersey Devils (1987–88)	39–30–10
80	L	April 3, 1988	2–3	@ Boston Bruins (1987–88)	39–31–10

Legend: Win (2 points) Loss (0 points) Tie (1 point)

== Playoffs ==
=== Patrick Division Semifinals vs. New Jersey Devils ===
Date	Away	Score	Home	Score	OT
April 6	New Jersey	3	New York	4	(OT)
April 7	New Jersey	3	New York	2	
April 9	New York	0	New Jersey	3	
April 10	New York	5	New Jersey	4	(OT)
April 12	New Jersey	4	New York	2	
April 14	New York	5	New Jersey	6	

New Jersey wins series 4-2

== Player statistics ==
Regular season
Scoring

Player	Pos	GP	G	A	Pts	PIM	+/-	PPG	SHG	GWG
Pat LaFontaine	C	75	47	45	92	52	12	15	0	7
Bryan Trottier	C	77	30	52	82	48	10	15	0	3
Mikko Makela	RW	73	36	40	76	22	14	13	2	4
Brent Sutter	C	70	29	31	60	55	13	11	2	2
Alan Kerr	RW	80	24	34	58	198	30	4	0	2
Denis Potvin	D	72	19	32	51	112	26	9	0	3
Tomas Jonsson	D	72	6	41	47	115	6	1	0	1
Greg Gilbert	LW	76	17	28	45	46	14	1	1	0
Randy Wood	LW/C	75	22	16	38	80	-2	0	1	2
Derek King	LW	55	12	24	36	30	7	1	0	4
Brad Lauer	LW	69	17	18	35	67	13	3	0	4
Patrick Flatley	RW	40	9	15	24	28	7	5	1	0
Bob Bassen	C	77	6	16	22	99	8	1	0	2
Dale Henry	LW	48	5	15	20	115	8	0	0	0
Gerald Diduck	D	68	7	12	19	113	22	4	0	1
Ken Leiter	D	51	4	13	17	24	18	1	0	1
Steve Konroyd	D	62	2	15	17	99	16	1	0	0
Gord Dineen	D	57	4	12	16	62	9	1	0	0
Richard Kromm	LW	71	5	10	15	20	2	0	1	1
Brad Dalgarno	RW	38	2	8	10	58	4	0	0	1
Jeff Norton	D	15	1	6	7	14	3	1	0	1
Ken Morrow	D	53	1	4	5	40	0	0	0	0
Jeff Finley	D	10	0	5	5	15	5	0	0	0
Todd McLellan	C	5	1	1	2	0	-1	0	0	0
Kelly Hrudey	G	47	0	2	2	20	0	0	0	0
Rod Dallman	LW	3	1	0	1	6	1	0	0	0
Mick Vukota	RW	17	1	0	1	82	1	0	0	0
Brian Curran	D	22	0	1	1	68	-9	0	0	0
Neal Coulter	RW	1	0	0	0	0	-1	0	0	0
Ari Haanpaa	LW	1	0	0	0	0	-2	0	0	0
Todd Okerlund	RW	4	0	0	0	2	0	0	0	0
Chris Pryor	D	1	0	0	0	2	1	0	0	0
Billy Smith	G	38	0	0	0	20	0	0	0	0
Mike Walsh	W	1	0	0	0	0	0	0	0	0

Goaltending

Player	MIN	GP	W	L	T	GA	GAA	SO	SA	SV	SV%
Kelly Hrudey	2751	47	22	17	5	153	3.34	3	1467	1314	.896
Billy Smith	2107	38	17	14	5	113	3.22	2	1062	949	.894
Team:	4858	80	39	31	10	266	3.29	5	2529	2263	.895

Playoffs
Scoring

Player	Pos	GP	G	A	Pts	PIM	+/-	PPG	SHG	GWG
Pat LaFontaine	C	6	4	5	9	8	2	1	0	1
Mikko Makela	RW	6	1	4	5	6	-6	1	0	0
Denis Potvin	D	5	1	4	5	6	-3	1	0	0
Brad Lauer	LW	5	3	1	4	4	5	0	0	0
Tomas Jonsson	D	5	2	2	4	10	-3	1	0	0
Brent Sutter	C	6	2	1	3	18	2	0	1	1
Derek King	LW	5	0	2	2	2	2	0	0	0
Jeff Norton	D	3	0	2	2	13	-1	0	0	0
Gerald Diduck	D	6	1	0	1	42	-1	1	0	0
Dale Henry	LW	6	1	0	1	17	0	0	1	0
Alan Kerr	RW	6	1	0	1	14	0	0	0	0
Steve Konroyd	D	6	1	0	1	4	3	0	1	0
Randy Wood	LW/C	5	1	0	1	6	4	0	0	0
Bob Bassen	C	6	0	1	1	23	2	0	0	0
Ken Leiter	D	4	0	1	1	2	1	0	0	0
Brad Dalgarno	RW	4	0	0	0	19	0	0	0	0
Jeff Finley	D	1	0	0	0	2	-1	0	0	0
Greg Gilbert	LW	4	0	0	0	6	-4	0	0	0
Kelly Hrudey	G	6	0	0	0	2	0	0	0	0
Richard Kromm	LW	5	0	0	0	5	0	0	0	0
Ken Morrow	D	6	0	0	0	8	-2	0	0	0
Bryan Trottier	C	6	0	0	0	10	-9	0	0	0
Mick Vukota	RW	2	0	0	0	23	0	0	0	0

Goaltending

Player	MIN	GP	W	L	GA	GAA	SO	SA	SV	SV%
Kelly Hrudey	381	6	2	4	23	3.62	0	154	131	.851
Team:	381	6	2	4	23	3.62	0	154	131	.851

Note: Pos = Position; GP = Games played; G = Goals; A = Assists; Pts = Points; +/- = plus/minus; PIM = Penalty minutes; PPG = Power-play goals; SHG = Short-handed goals; GWG = Game-winning goals
MIN = Minutes played; W = Wins; L = Losses; T = Ties; GA = Goals-against; GAA = Goals-against average; SO = Shutouts; SA = Shots against; SV = Shots saved; SV% = Save percentage;

== Draft picks ==
New York's draft picks at the 1987 NHL entry draft held at the Joe Louis Arena in Detroit, Michigan.

Round	#	Player	Nationality	College/Junior/Club team (League)
1	13	Dean Chynoweth	Canada	Medicine Hat Tigers (WHL)
2	34	Jeff Hackett	Canada	Oshawa Generals (OHL)
3	55	Dean Ewen	Canada	Spokane Chiefs (WHL)
4	76	George Maneluk	Canada	Brandon Wheat Kings (WHL)
5	97	Petr Vlk	Czechoslovakia	Dukla Jihlava (Czechoslovakia)
6	118	Rob DiMaio	Canada	Medicine Hat Tigers (WHL)
7	139	Knut Walbye	Norway	Furuset Ishockey (Norway)
8	160	Jeff Saterdalen	United States	Bloomington Jefferson High School (USHS-MN)
9	181	Shawn Howard	Canada	Penticton Knights (BCJHL)
10	202	John Herlihy	United States	Babson College (ECAC East)
11	223	Mike Erickson	United States	St. John's Hill School (USHS-MA)
12	244	Will Averill	United States	Belmont High School (USHS-MA)
S2	14	Howie Vandermast	United States	State University of New York at Potsdam (SUNYAC)

== See also ==
- 1987–88 NHL season
