= 1987–88 Vancouver Canucks season =

18th season in franchise history

1987–88 Vancouver Canucks
- Division: 5th Smythe
- Conference: 8th Campbell
- 1987–88 record: 25–46–9
- Home record: 15–20–5
- Road record: 10–26–4
- Goals for: 272
- Goals against: 320

Team information
- General manager: Pat Quinn
- Coach: Bob McCammon
- Captain: Stan Smyl
- Alternate captains: Barry Pederson; Doug Lidster; Tony Tanti; Daryl Stanley; Garth Butcher
- Arena: Pacific Coliseum
- Average attendance: 11,002

Team leaders
- Goals: Tony Tanti (40)
- Assists: Barry Pederson (52)
- Points: Tony Tanti (77)
- Penalty minutes: Garth Butcher (285)
- Wins: Kirk McLean (11)
- Goals against average: Steve Weeks (3.38)

The 1987–88 Vancouver Canucks season was the team's 18th in the National Hockey League (NHL). The Canucks missed the playoffs for the second season in a row.

== Regular season ==
The Canucks had a very disappointing season, they were not capable of winning 3 games in a row during the season. However, after the season they were able to draft future captain Trevor Linden.

=== Final standings ===
Smythe Division
	GP	W	L	T	GF	GA	Pts
**Calgary Flames**	80	48	23	9	397	305	105
**Edmonton Oilers**	80	44	25	11	363	288	99
**Winnipeg Jets**	80	33	36	11	292	310	77
**Los Angeles Kings**	80	30	42	8	318	359	68
Vancouver Canucks	80	25	46	9	272	320	59

Note: GP = Games played, W = Wins, L = Losses, T = Ties, Pts = Points, GF = Goals for, GA = Goals against
Note: Teams that qualified for the playoffs are highlighted in bold.

=== Record vs. opponents ===
Smythe Division record vs. opponents

==== Vs. Campbell Conference ====
**Vs. Smythe Division**

1987–88 NHL records
Team	**CGY**	**EDM**	**LAK**	**VAN**	**WIN**	**Total**
Calgary	—	4–3–1	4–4	6–0–2	3–4–1	**17–11–4**
Edmonton	3–4–1	—	4–2–2	7–0–1	4–1–3	**18–7–7**
Los Angeles	4–4	2–4–2	—	3–4–1	3–5	**12–17–3**
Vancouver	0–6–2	0–7–1	4–3–1	—	3–5	**7–21–4**
Winnipeg	4–3–1	1–4–3	5–3	5–3	—	**15–13–4**

**Vs. Norris Division**

1987–88 NHL records
Team	**CHI**	**DET**	**MIN**	**STL**	**TOR**	**Total**
Calgary	2–0–1	1–1–1	2–0–1	2–1	3–0	**10–2–3**
Edmonton	1–2	1–2	2–0–1	3–0	2–0–1	**9–4–2**
Los Angeles	2–1	1–2	3–0	2–1	1–1–1	**9–5–1**
Vancouver	1–2	1–2	2–1	1–2	1–1–1	**6–8–1**
Winnipeg	1–1–1	0–2–1	2–0–1	2–1	2–1	**7–5–3**

**Vs. Wales Conference**

**Vs. Adams Division**

1987–88 NHL records
Team	**BOS**	**BUF**	**HFD**	**MTL**	**QUE**	**Total**
Calgary	1–2	2–1	3–0	2–0–1	3–0	**11–3–1**
Edmonton	1–1–1	3–0	2–1	0–3	1–1–1	**7–6–2**
Los Angeles	0–2–1	1–2	0–3	1–2	2–1	**4–10–1**
Vancouver	1–2	1–1–1	0–1–2	0–2–1	3–0	**5–6–4**
Winnipeg	0–3	1–1–1	1–2	0–3	2–0–1	**4–9–2**

**Vs. Patrick Division**

1987–88 NHL records
Team	**NJD**	**NYI**	**NYR**	**PHI**	**PIT**	**WSH**	**Total**
Calgary	2–1	1–2	2–1	3–0	0–2–1	2–1	**10–7–1**
Edmonton	1–2	1–2	2–1	2–1	3–0	1–2	**10–8–0**
Los Angeles	1–1–1	0–3	3–0	0–3	0–1–2	1–2	**5–10–3**
Vancouver	3–0	0–3	1–2	1–2	2–1	0–3	**7–11–0**
Winnipeg	2–0–1	1–2	0–2–1	0–3	2–1	2–1	**7–9–2**

== Schedule and results ==
1987–88 regular season
October

Game	Result	Date	Score	Opponent	Record
1	W	October 8, 1987	8–2	St. Louis Blues (1987–88)	1–0–0
2	L	October 10, 1987	1–7	New York Islanders (1987–88)	1–1–0
3	L	October 12, 1987	2–3	Detroit Red Wings (1987–88)	1–2–0
4	W	October 18, 1987	4–2	@ Los Angeles Kings (1987–88)	2–2–0
5	L	October 21, 1987	4–5	Boston Bruins (1987–88)	2–3–0
6	L	October 23, 1987	4–5 OT	Edmonton Oilers (1987–88)	2–4–0
7	L	October 24, 1987	5–9	@ Edmonton Oilers (1987–88)	2–5–0
8	L	October 27, 1987	2–3	Washington Capitals (1987–88)	2–6–0
9	T	October 30, 1987	3–3 OT	Calgary Flames (1987–88)	2–6–1

November

Game	Result	Date	Score	Opponent	Record
10	L	November 1, 1987	3–7	@ Winnipeg Jets (1987–88)	2–7–1
11	L	November 3, 1987	2–3	@ Washington Capitals (1987–88)	2–8–1
12	W	November 5, 1987	4–3	@ Philadelphia Flyers (1987–88)	3–8–1
13	W	November 7, 1987	4–1	@ Minnesota North Stars (1987–88)	4–8–1
14	L	November 8, 1987	1–3	@ Winnipeg Jets (1987–88)	4–9–1
15	T	November 11, 1987	4–4 OT	Buffalo Sabres (1987–88)	4–9–2
16	W	November 13, 1987	6–4	Quebec Nordiques (1987–88)	5–9–2
17	L	November 15, 1987	4–8	@ Calgary Flames (1987–88)	5–10–2
18	W	November 17, 1987	6–4	Pittsburgh Penguins (1987–88)	6–10–2
19	W	November 19, 1987	4–1	@ Detroit Red Wings (1987–88)	7–10–2
20	L	November 21, 1987	1–4	@ St. Louis Blues (1987–88)	7–11–2
21	L	November 22, 1987	2–3	@ Chicago Blackhawks (1987–88)	7–12–2
22	L	November 25, 1987	2–4	Calgary Flames (1987–88)	7–13–2
23	W	November 27, 1987	4–2	New Jersey Devils (1987–88)	8–13–2

December

Game	Result	Date	Score	Opponent	Record
24	W	December 1, 1987	3–1	@ Quebec Nordiques (1987–88)	9–13–2
25	T	December 2, 1987	3–3 OT	@ Montreal Canadiens (1987–88)	9–13–3
26	L	December 5, 1987	3–6	@ Pittsburgh Penguins (1987–88)	9–14–3
27	W	December 6, 1987	5–1	@ Buffalo Sabres (1987–88)	10–14–3
28	L	December 8, 1987	2–3	Minnesota North Stars (1987–88)	10–15–3
29	L	December 11, 1987	1–2	@ Edmonton Oilers (1987–88)	10–16–3
30	L	December 12, 1987	3–6	Edmonton Oilers (1987–88)	10–17–3
31	T	December 15, 1987	2–2 OT	@ Hartford Whalers (1987–88)	10–17–4
32	L	December 17, 1987	2–3 OT	@ Boston Bruins (1987–88)	10–18–4
33	T	December 20, 1987	3–3 OT	Hartford Whalers (1987–88)	10–18–5
34	W	December 23, 1987	5–1	Los Angeles Kings (1987–88)	11–18–5
35	L	December 26, 1987	2–3	@ Los Angeles Kings (1987–88)	11–19–5
36	L	December 28, 1987	3–7	@ Edmonton Oilers (1987–88)	11–20–5
37	L	December 29, 1987	1–4	Montreal Canadiens (1987–88)	11–21–5
38	W	December 31, 1987	2–1	Winnipeg Jets (1987–88)	12–21–5

January

Game	Result	Date	Score	Opponent	Record
39	L	January 2, 1988	1–4	Philadelphia Flyers (1987–88)	12–22–5
40	T	January 4, 1988	7–7 OT	@ Toronto Maple Leafs (1987–88)	12–22–6
41	L	January 6, 1988	2–4	@ New York Rangers (1987–88)	12–23–6
42	W	January 7, 1988	6–3	@ New Jersey Devils (1987–88)	13–23–6
43	W	January 9, 1988	3–2	@ Quebec Nordiques (1987–88)	14–23–6
44	L	January 12, 1988	3–5	Winnipeg Jets (1987–88)	14–24–6
45	W	January 13, 1988	8–2	Winnipeg Jets (1987–88)	15–24–6
46	T	January 15, 1988	4–4 OT	Calgary Flames (1987–88)	15–24–7
47	W	January 17, 1988	6–5	@ Winnipeg Jets (1987–88)	16–24–7
48	L	January 19, 1988	5–7	@ Calgary Flames (1987–88)	16–25–7
49	L	January 22, 1988	3–6	New York Rangers (1987–88)	16–26–7
50	L	January 24, 1988	1–3	@ Chicago Blackhawks (1987–88)	16–27–7
51	L	January 26, 1988	6–7	@ St. Louis Blues (1987–88)	16–28–7
52	L	January 29, 1988	2–4	Hartford Whalers (1987–88)	16–29–7
53	L	January 30, 1988	3–4	@ Calgary Flames (1987–88)	16–30–7

February

Game	Result	Date	Score	Opponent	Record
54	W	February 2, 1988	5–2	Los Angeles Kings (1987–88)	17–30–7
55	L	February 3, 1988	2–7	@ Los Angeles Kings (1987–88)	17–31–7
56	W	February 5, 1988	5–1	New Jersey Devils (1987–88)	18–31–7
57	L	February 11, 1988	2–7	Edmonton Oilers (1987–88)	18–32–7
58	W	February 13, 1988	6–5	Boston Bruins (1987–88)	19–32–7
59	L	February 14, 1988	6–7	@ Edmonton Oilers (1987–88)	19–33–7
60	W	February 17, 1988	5–0	Pittsburgh Penguins (1987–88)	20–33–7
61	L	February 19, 1988	0–5	Toronto Maple Leafs (1987–88)	20–34–7
62	W	February 21, 1988	6–4	@ New York Rangers (1987–88)	21–34–7
63	L	February 23, 1988	1–6	@ New York Islanders (1987–88)	21–35–7
64	L	February 24, 1988	4–5	@ Montreal Canadiens (1987–88)	21–36–7
65	L	February 26, 1988	3–5	Calgary Flames (1987–88)	21–37–7
66	L	February 28, 1988	0–2	Los Angeles Kings (1987–88)	21–38–7

March

Game	Result	Date	Score	Opponent	Record
67	L	March 1, 1988	3–7	Philadelphia Flyers (1987–88)	21–39–7
68	L	March 3, 1988	3–4	@ Winnipeg Jets (1987–88)	21–40–7
69	L	March 6, 1988	2–7	@ Washington Capitals (1987–88)	21–41–7
70	L	March 8, 1988	4–7	@ New York Islanders (1987–88)	21–42–7
71	L	March 10, 1988	2–5	@ Detroit Red Wings (1987–88)	21–43–7
72	T	March 12, 1988	3–3 OT	Edmonton Oilers (1987–88)	21–43–8
73	L	March 13, 1988	5–7	Buffalo Sabres (1987–88)	21–44–8
74	T	March 16, 1988	3–3 OT	@ Los Angeles Kings (1987–88)	21–44–9
75	W	March 18, 1988	5–3	Los Angeles Kings (1987–88)	22–44–9
76	W	March 22, 1988	5–3	Toronto Maple Leafs (1987–88)	23–44–9
77	W	March 25, 1988	3–2	Chicago Blackhawks (1987–88)	24–44–9
78	L	March 26, 1988	1–6	@ Calgary Flames (1987–88)	24–45–9
79	L	March 29, 1988	2–3	Winnipeg Jets (1987–88)	24–46–9

April

Game	Result	Date	Score	Opponent	Record
80	W	April 1, 1988	6–1	Minnesota North Stars (1987–88)	25–46–9

Legend: Win (2 points) Loss (0 points) Tie (1 point)

== Player statistics ==
Note: GP = Games played; G = Goals; A = Assists; Pts = Points; +/- = Plus/Minus; PIM = Penalty Minutes

Player	GP	G	A	Pts	+/-	PIM
Tony Tanti	73	40	37	77	-1	90
Greg Adams	80	36	40	76	-24	30
Barry Pederson	76	19	52	71	2	92
Petri Skriko	73	30	34	64	-12	32
Stan Smyl	57	12	25	37	-5	110

== Draft picks ==
Vancouver's draft picks at the 1987 NHL entry draft held at the Joe Louis Arena in Detroit, Michigan. The Canucks attempted to select Chris Gillies in the second round of the 1987 NHL supplemental draft, but the claim was ruled invalid since Gillies entered school after age 20 and therefore did not meet eligibility requirements.

Round	#	Player	Nationality	College/Junior/Club team (League)
2	24	Rob Murphy	Canada	Laval Titan (QMJHL)
3	45	Steve Veilleux	Canada	Trois-Rivières Draveurs (QMJHL)
4	66	Doug Torrel	United States	Hibbing High School (USHS-MN)
5	87	Sean Fabian	United States	Hill-Murray School (USHS-MN)
6	108	Garry Valk	Canada	Sherwood Park Crusaders (AJHL)
7	129	Todd Fanning	Canada	Ohio State University (CCHA)
8	150	Viktor Tyumenev	Soviet Union	Spartak Moscow (USSR)
9	171	Craig Daly	United States	New Hampton School (USHS-NH)
10	192	John Fletcher	United States	Clarkson University (ECAC)
11	213	Roger Hansson	Sweden	Rögle BK (Sweden)
12	233	Neil Eisenhut	Canada	Langley Eagles (BCJHL)
12	234	Matt Evo	United States	Country Day School (USHS-MA)
S1	3	Steve Johnson	United States	University of North Dakota (WCHA)

== See also ==
- 1987–88 NHL season
