= 1987–88 Minnesota North Stars season =

National Hockey League team season

1987–88 Minnesota North Stars
- Division: 5th Norris
- Conference: 10th Campbell
- 1987–88 record: 19–48–13
- Home record: 10–24–6
- Road record: 9–24–7
- Goals for: 242
- Goals against: 349

Team information
- General manager: Lou Nanne (Oct-Jan); Jack Ferreira (Jan-Apr)
- Coach: Herb Brooks
- Captain: Craig Hartsburg
- Arena: Met Center

Team leaders
- Goals: Dino Ciccarelli (41)
- Assists: Dino Ciccarelli (45)
- Points: Dino Ciccarelli (86)
- Penalty minutes: Basil McRae (382)
- Plus/minus: Scott Bjugstad and Pat Micheletti (+2)
- Wins: Don Beaupre (10)
- Goals against average: Jon Casey (3.71)

The 1987–88 Minnesota North Stars season was the North Stars' 21st season. It saw the North Stars finish fifth in the Norris Division with a record of 19 wins, 48 losses, and 13 ties for 51 points — the worst record in the league. They failed to make the Stanley Cup playoffs for the second consecutive season. Despite finishing with the third-lowest winning percentage (at .319) and second-fewest wins in franchise history, they were still in contention for a playoff spot going into the last game of the season due to playing in an extremely weak Norris Division; the division champion Detroit Red Wings were the only team with a winning record. The Stars lost to the Calgary Flames on the season's final day and finished last in scoring (242 goals in favor) and penalty-killing percentage (75.23%). The day before, the Toronto Maple Leafs, who were trailing the Stars for the fourth spot in the Norris as the day began, beat the Red Wings. This not only eliminated the Stars out of the playoffs but also assured them of the worst record in the league.

The leading scorer for the North Stars in 1987–88 was Dino Ciccarelli. However, he became involved in controversy when, on January 6, 1988, he struck Toronto Maple Leafs defenceman Luke Richardson with his stick in a game at Maple Leaf Gardens in Toronto. Ciccarelli was arrested and charged with assault; he was eventually fined $1000 and sentenced to one day in jail.

== Offseason ==
=== NHL draft ===
Round	#	Player	Nationality	College/junior/club team
1	6	Dave Archibald (RW)	Canada	Portland Winter Hawks (WHL)
2	35	Scott McCrady (D)	Canada	Medicine Hat Tigers (WHL)
3	48	Kevin Kaminski (C)	Canada	Saskatoon Blades (WHL)
4	73	John Weisbrod (C)	United States	Choate Rosemary Hall (USHS-CT)
5	88	Teppo Kivela (C)	Finland	HPK (Finland)
6	109	Darcy Norton (LW)	Canada	Kamloops Blazers (WHL)
7	130	Timo Kulonen (D)	Finland	KalPa (Finland)
8	151	Don Schmidt (D)	Canada	Kamloops Blazers (WHL)
9	172	Jarmo Myllys (G)	Finland	Lukko (Finland)
10	193	Larry Olimb (C)	United States	Warroad High School (USHS-MN)
11	214	Marc Felicio (G)	United States	Northwood School (USHS-NY)
12	235	Dave Shields (C)	Canada	University of Denver (WCHA)
S1	4	Shawn Chambers (D)	United States	University of Alaska Fairbanks (CCHA)
S2	8	Rick Boh (C)	Canada	Colorado College (WCHA)

== Regular season ==
=== Final standings ===
Norris Division
	GP	W	L	T	GF	GA	Pts
**Detroit Red Wings**	80	41	28	11	322	269	93
**St. Louis Blues**	80	34	38	8	278	294	76
**Chicago Blackhawks**	80	30	41	9	284	328	69
**Toronto Maple Leafs**	80	21	49	10	273	345	52
Minnesota North Stars	80	19	48	13	242	349	51

Note: GP = Games played, W = Wins, L = Losses, T = Ties, Pts = Points, GF = Goals for, GA = Goals against
Note: Teams that qualified for the playoffs are highlighted in bold.

=== Record vs. opponents ===
Norris Division record vs. opponents

==== Vs. Campbell Conference ====
**Vs. Norris Division**

1987–88 NHL records
Team	**CHI**	**DET**	**MIN**	**STL**	**TOR**	**Total**
Chicago	—	3–5	5–2–1	3–4–1	5–3	**16–14–2**
Detroit	5–3	—	4–3–1	4–1–3	3–3–2	**16–10–6**
Minnesota	2–5–1	3–4–1	—	2–5–1	4–1–3	**11–15–6**
St. Louis	4–3–1	1–4–3	5–2–1	—	6–1–1	**16–10–6**
Toronto	3–5	3–3–2	1–4–3	1–6–1	—	**8–18–6**

**Vs. Smythe Division**

1987–88 NHL records
Team	**CGY**	**EDM**	**LAK**	**VAN**	**WIN**	**Total**
Chicago	0–2–1	2–1	1–2	2–1	1–1–1	**6–7–2**
Detroit	1–1–1	2–1	2–1	2–1	2–0–1	**9–4–2**
Minnesota	0–2–1	0–2–1	0–3	1–2	0–2–1	**1–11–3**
St. Louis	1–2	0–3	1–2	2–1	1–2	**5–10–0**
Toronto	0–3	0–2–1	1–1–1	1–1–1	1–2	**3–9–3**

**Vs. Wales Conference**

**Vs. Adams Division**

1987–88 NHL records
Team	**BOS**	**BUF**	**HFD**	**MTL**	**QUE**	**Total**
Chicago	0–3	1–2	1–2	0–2–1	0–2–1	**2–11–2**
Detroit	2–1	2–1	1–2	1–2	0–3	**6–9–0**
Minnesota	0–3	1–1–1	0–3	1–1–1	1–2	**3–10–2**
St. Louis	2–1	0–3	2–1	1–2	2–1	**7–8–0**
Toronto	1–2	0–3	0–3	0–3	0–3	**1–14–0**

**Vs. Patrick Division**

1987–88 NHL records
Team	**NJD**	**NYI**	**NYR**	**PHI**	**PIT**	**WSH**	**Total**
Chicago	0–3	1–0–2	0–2–1	3–0	1–2	1–2	**6–9–3**
Detroit	3–0	2–1	1–1–1	0–2–1	2–1	2–0–1	**10–5–3**
Minnesota	0–3	1–1–1	1–2	1–2	1–2	0–2–1	**4–12–2**
St. Louis	0–3	0–2–1	0–3	1–2	3–0	2–0–1	**6–10–2**
Toronto	1–2	3–0	1–2	2–1	1–2	1–1–1	**9–8–1**

== Schedule and results ==
1987–88 regular season
October

Game	Result	Date	Score	Opponent	Record
1	T	October 8, 1987	2–2 OT	@ Buffalo Sabres (1987–88)	0–0–1
2	L	October 10, 1987	4–5	Philadelphia Flyers (1987–88)	0–1–1
3	L	October 12, 1987	2–4	@ New York Rangers (1987–88)	0–2–1
4	W	October 14, 1987	4–3	Toronto Maple Leafs (1987–88)	1–2–1
5	L	October 17, 1987	2–5	Winnipeg Jets (1987–88)	1–3–1
6	L	October 19, 1987	1–5	@ Montreal Canadiens (1987–88)	1–4–1
7	W	October 22, 1987	5–3	@ Quebec Nordiques (1987–88)	2–4–1
8	W	October 24, 1987	7–4	@ Toronto Maple Leafs (1987–88)	3–4–1
9	W	October 27, 1987	5–3	@ St. Louis Blues (1987–88)	4–4–1
10	L	October 29, 1987	2–3	St. Louis Blues (1987–88)	4–5–1
11	T	October 31, 1987	3–3 OT	Washington Capitals (1987–88)	4–5–2

November

Game	Result	Date	Score	Opponent	Record
12	T	November 3, 1987	2–2 OT	@ Detroit Red Wings (1987–88)	4–5–3
13	W	November 4, 1987	7–4	Detroit Red Wings (1987–88)	5–5–3
14	L	November 7, 1987	1–4	Vancouver Canucks (1987–88)	5–6–3
15	L	November 8, 1987	5–8	@ Chicago Blackhawks (1987–88)	5–7–3
16	L	November 11, 1987	3–4	Calgary Flames (1987–88)	5–8–3
17	W	November 13, 1987	5–4	@ Buffalo Sabres (1987–88)	6–8–3
18	L	November 14, 1987	1–4	@ Washington Capitals (1987–88)	6–9–3
19	L	November 18, 1987	2–5	@ Chicago Blackhawks (1987–88)	6–10–3
20	W	November 19, 1987	4–3	New York Rangers (1987–88)	7–10–3
21	L	November 21, 1987	5–7	Boston Bruins (1987–88)	7–11–3
22	L	November 25, 1987	3–4 OT	St. Louis Blues (1987–88)	7–12–3
23	W	November 27, 1987	4–2	Montreal Canadiens (1987–88)	8–12–3
24	W	November 28, 1987	6–4	@ St. Louis Blues (1987–88)	9–12–3

December

Game	Result	Date	Score	Opponent	Record
25	W	December 1, 1987	3–2 OT	Toronto Maple Leafs (1987–88)	10–12–3
26	T	December 5, 1987	4–4 OT	@ Calgary Flames (1987–88)	10–12–4
27	L	December 6, 1987	4–10	@ Edmonton Oilers (1987–88)	10–13–4
28	W	December 8, 1987	3–2	@ Vancouver Canucks (1987–88)	11–13–4
29	L	December 10, 1987	4–5	St. Louis Blues (1987–88)	11–14–4
30	L	December 12, 1987	0–5	Quebec Nordiques (1987–88)	11–15–4
31	L	December 16, 1987	2–4	Chicago Blackhawks (1987–88)	11–16–4
32	L	December 18, 1987	3–8	@ Detroit Red Wings (1987–88)	11–17–4
33	L	December 19, 1987	1–3	New Jersey Devils (1987–88)	11–18–4
34	T	December 21, 1987	0–0 OT	@ Toronto Maple Leafs (1987–88)	11–18–5
35	L	December 23, 1987	3–5	@ Philadelphia Flyers (1987–88)	11–19–5
36	L	December 26, 1987	4–5 OT	@ Winnipeg Jets (1987–88)	11–20–5
37	W	December 27, 1987	5–4	Detroit Red Wings (1987–88)	12–20–5
38	W	December 30, 1987	6–4	@ Chicago Blackhawks (1987–88)	13–20–5
39	L	December 31, 1987	1–4	Chicago Blackhawks (1987–88)	13–21–5

January

Game	Result	Date	Score	Opponent	Record
40	L	January 2, 1988	3–5	New York Rangers (1987–88)	13–22–5
41	T	January 5, 1988	3–3 OT	@ New York Islanders (1987–88)	13–22–6
42	T	January 6, 1988	5–5 OT	@ Toronto Maple Leafs (1987–88)	13–22–7
43	L	January 9, 1988	3–4	New Jersey Devils (1987–88)	13–23–7
44	L	January 11, 1988	4–5	Los Angeles Kings (1987–88)	13–24–7
45	T	January 13, 1988	3–3 OT	Toronto Maple Leafs (1987–88)	13–24–8
46	L	January 15, 1988	1–2	@ Detroit Red Wings (1987–88)	13–25–8
47	W	January 16, 1988	4–2	Detroit Red Wings (1987–88)	14–25–8
48	L	January 19, 1988	3–6	Hartford Whalers (1987–88)	14–26–8
49	L	January 21, 1988	1–6	@ Boston Bruins (1987–88)	14–27–8
50	L	January 23, 1988	0–5	@ Hartford Whalers (1987–88)	14–28–8
51	W	January 24, 1988	5–3	@ Philadelphia Flyers (1987–88)	15–28–8
52	W	January 27, 1988	2–1	New York Islanders (1987–88)	16–28–8
53	L	January 28, 1988	1–9	@ St. Louis Blues (1987–88)	16–29–8
54	L	January 30, 1988	0–5	@ Los Angeles Kings (1987–88)	16–30–8

February

Game	Result	Date	Score	Opponent	Record
55	L	February 3, 1988	0–2	St. Louis Blues (1987–88)	16–31–8
56	L	February 4, 1988	0–1	@ Pittsburgh Penguins (1987–88)	16–32–8
57	T	February 6, 1988	8–8 OT	Winnipeg Jets (1987–88)	16–32–9
58	L	February 13, 1988	3–7	Quebec Nordiques (1987–88)	16–33–9
59	L	February 17, 1988	4–5	Los Angeles Kings (1987–88)	16–34–9
60	L	February 20, 1988	0–3	Washington Capitals (1987–88)	16–35–9
61	W	February 22, 1988	4–2	Toronto Maple Leafs (1987–88)	17–35–9
62	L	February 24, 1988	2–4	@ Toronto Maple Leafs (1987–88)	17–36–9
63	L	February 27, 1988	4–7	@ Boston Bruins (1987–88)	17–37–9
64	L	February 28, 1988	6–8	@ New Jersey Devils (1987–88)	17–38–9

March

Game	Result	Date	Score	Opponent	Record
65	L	March 1, 1988	3–8	@ Pittsburgh Penguins (1987–88)	17–39–9
66	L	March 3, 1988	3–6	@ Detroit Red Wings (1987–88)	17–40–9
67	L	March 5, 1988	2–4	Chicago Blackhawks (1987–88)	17–41–9
68	L	March 9, 1988	2–6	Buffalo Sabres (1987–88)	17–42–9
69	W	March 12, 1988	6–3	Pittsburgh Penguins (1987–88)	18–42–9
70	T	March 14, 1988	2–2 OT	Montreal Canadiens (1987–88)	18–42–10
71	L	March 16, 1988	1–2	Detroit Red Wings (1987–88)	18–43–10
72	T	March 17, 1988	2–2 OT	@ St. Louis Blues (1987–88)	18–43–11
73	T	March 20, 1988	5–5 OT	Edmonton Oilers (1987–88)	18–43–12
74	L	March 21, 1988	1–5	New York Islanders (1987–88)	18–44–12
75	W	March 23, 1988	5–4	@ Chicago Blackhawks (1987–88)	19–44–12
76	L	March 26, 1988	1–8	@ Hartford Whalers (1987–88)	19–45–12
77	T	March 28, 1988	7–7 OT	Chicago Blackhawks (1987–88)	19–45–13
78	L	March 30, 1988	3–6	@ Edmonton Oilers (1987–88)	19–46–13

April

Game	Result	Date	Score	Opponent	Record
79	L	April 1, 1988	1–6	@ Vancouver Canucks (1987–88)	19–47–13
80	L	April 3, 1988	1–4	@ Calgary Flames (1987–88)	19–48–13

Legend: Win (2 points) Loss (0 points) Tie (1 point)

== Player statistics ==
=== Forwards ===
Note: GP = Games played; G = Goals; A = Assists; Pts = Points; PIM = Penalty minutes

Player	GP	G	A	Pts	PIM
Dino Ciccarelli	67	41	45	86	79
Brian Bellows	77	40	41	81	81
Brian MacLellan	75	16	32	48	74
Brian Lawton	74	17	24	41	71
Neal Broten	54	9	30	39	32
Dave Archibald	78	13	20	33	26
Bob Brooke	77	5	20	25	108
Scott Bjugstad	33	10	12	22	15
Dave Gagner	51	8	11	19	55

=== Defensemen ===
Note: GP = Games played; G = Goals; A = Assists; Pts = Points; PIM = Penalty minutes

Player	GP	G	A	Pts	PIM

=== Goaltending ===
Note: GP = Games played; W = Wins; L = Losses; T = Ties; SO = Shutouts; GAA = Goals against average

Player	GP	W	L	T	SO	GAA
Don Beaupre	43	10	22	3	0	4.22
Kari Takko	37	8	19	6	1	4.47
Jon Casey	14	1	7	4	0	3.71
