= 1987–88 Buffalo Sabres season =

NHL hockey team season

1987–88 Buffalo Sabres
- Division: 3rd Adams
- Conference: 4th Wales
- 1987–88 record: 37–32–11
- Home record: 19–14–7
- Road record: 18–18–4
- Goals for: 283
- Goals against: 305

Team information
- General manager: Gerry Meehan
- Coach: Ted Sator
- Captain: Lindy Ruff
- Alternate captains: Mike Foligno; Phil Housley
- Arena: Buffalo Memorial Auditorium

Team leaders
- Goals: Ray Sheppard (38)
- Assists: Dave Andreychuk (48)
- Points: Dave Andreychuk (78)
- Penalty minutes: Mike Foligno (220)
- Wins: Tom Barrasso (25)
- Goals against average: Tom Barrasso (3.32)

The 1987–88 Buffalo Sabres season was the 18th season for the National Hockey League (NHL) franchise that was established on May 22, 1970.

== Regular season ==
=== Final standings ===
Adams Division
	GP	W	L	T	GF	GA	Pts
**Montreal Canadiens**	80	45	22	13	298	238	103
**Boston Bruins**	80	44	30	6	300	251	94
**Buffalo Sabres**	80	37	32	11	283	305	85
**Hartford Whalers**	80	35	38	7	249	267	77
Quebec Nordiques	80	32	43	5	271	306	69

Note: GP = Games played, W = Wins, L = Losses, T = Ties, Pts = Points, GF = Goals for, GA = Goals against
Note: Teams that qualified for the playoffs are highlighted in bold.

=== Record vs. opponents ===
Adams Division record vs. opponents

==== Vs. Wales Conference ====
**Vs. Adams Division**

1987–88 NHL records
Team	**BOS**	**BUF**	**HFD**	**MTL**	**QUE**	**Total**
Boston	—	4–3–1	4–3–1	3–4–1	5–3	**16–13–3**
Buffalo	3–4–1	—	3–4–1	3–3–2	5–2–1	**14–13–5**
Hartford	3–4–1	4–3–1	—	2–4–2	2–6	**11–17–4**
Montreal	4–3–1	3–3–2	4–2−2	—	6–2	**17–10–5**
Quebec	3–5	2–5–1	6–2	2–6	—	**13–18–1**

**Vs. Patrick Division**

1987–88 NHL records
Team	**NJD**	**NYI**	**NYR**	**PHI**	**PIT**	**WSH**	**Total**
Boston	2–1	1–2	1–2	1–2	2–0–1	1–2	**8–9–1**
Buffalo	2–0–1	1–2	3–0	0–3	0–2–1	2–0–1	**8–7–3**
Hartford	1–1–1	1–2	1–2	1–2	1–2	1–2	**6–11–1**
Montreal	1–2	3–0	1–1–1	1–0–2	1–2	1–1–1	**8–6–4**
Quebec	3–0	1–2	1–2	0–2–1	0–3	1–2	**6–11–1**

==== Vs. Campbell Conference ====
**Vs. Norris Division**

1987–88 NHL records
Team	**CHI**	**DET**	**MIN**	**STL**	**TOR**	**Total**
Boston	3–0	1–2	3–0	1–2	2–1	**10–5–0**
Buffalo	2–1	1–2	1–1–1	3–0	3–0	**10–4–1**
Hartford	2–1	2–1	3–0	1–2	3–0	**11–4–0**
Montreal	2–0–1	2–1	1–1–1	2–1	3–0	**10–3–2**
Quebec	2–0–1	3–0	2–1	1–2	3–0	**11–3–1**

**Vs. Smythe Division**

1987–88 NHL records
Team	**CGY**	**EDM**	**LAK**	**VAN**	**WIN**	**Total**
Boston	2–1	1–1–1	2–0–1	2–1	3–0	**10–3–2**
Buffalo	1–2	0–3	2–1	1–1–1	1–1–1	**5–8–2**
Hartford	0–3	1–2	3–0	1–0–2	2–1	**7–6–2**
Montreal	0–2–1	3–0	2–1	2–0–1	3–0	**10–3–2**
Quebec	0–3	1–1–1	1–2	0–3	0–2–1	**2–11–2**

== Schedule and results ==
1987–88 regular season
October

Game	Result	Date	Score	Opponent	Record
1	T	October 8, 1987	2–2 OT	Minnesota North Stars (1987–88)	0–0–1
2	L	October 10, 1987	3–6	@ Montreal Canadiens (1987–88)	0–1–1
3	W	October 11, 1987	6–5	Washington Capitals (1987–88)	1–1–1
4	L	October 13, 1987	3–8	@ Pittsburgh Penguins (1987–88)	1–2–1
5	T	October 16, 1987	2–2 OT	Quebec Nordiques (1987–88)	1–2–2
6	W	October 17, 1987	6–3	@ Quebec Nordiques (1987–88)	2–2–2
7	L	October 21, 1987	3–5	Hartford Whalers (1987–88)	2–3–2
8	W	October 23, 1987	5–3	Montreal Canadiens (1987–88)	3–3–2
9	L	October 24, 1987	3–5	@ Pittsburgh Penguins (1987–88)	3–4–2
10	T	October 28, 1987	2–2 OT	@ Hartford Whalers (1987–88)	3–4–3
11	W	October 30, 1987	5–1	Los Angeles Kings (1987–88)	4–4–3

November

Game	Result	Date	Score	Opponent	Record
12	W	November 1, 1987	5–3	Chicago Blackhawks (1987–88)	5–4–3
13	W	November 4, 1987	5–4	@ Los Angeles Kings (1987–88)	6–4–3
14	L	November 7, 1987	0–5	@ Edmonton Oilers (1987–88)	6–5–3
15	W	November 8, 1987	6–3	@ Calgary Flames (1987–88)	7–5–3
16	T	November 11, 1987	4–4 OT	@ Vancouver Canucks (1987–88)	7–5–4
17	L	November 13, 1987	4–5	Minnesota North Stars (1987–88)	7–6–4
18	W	November 15, 1987	5–4	Toronto Maple Leafs (1987–88)	8–6–4
19	L	November 18, 1987	1–9	@ Hartford Whalers (1987–88)	8–7–4
20	W	November 20, 1987	5–3	Washington Capitals (1987–88)	9–7–4
21	L	November 22, 1987	5–8	Los Angeles Kings (1987–88)	9–8–4
22	L	November 25, 1987	2–5	@ Philadelphia Flyers (1987–88)	9–9–4
23	L	November 27, 1987	2–4	Hartford Whalers (1987–88)	9–10–4
24	L	November 29, 1987	2–5	Edmonton Oilers (1987–88)	9–11–4

December

Game	Result	Date	Score	Opponent	Record
25	W	December 3, 1987	6–3	Quebec Nordiques (1987–88)	10–11–4
26	L	December 5, 1987	1–2	@ Hartford Whalers (1987–88)	10–12–4
27	L	December 6, 1987	1–5	Vancouver Canucks (1987–88)	10–13–4
28	W	December 9, 1987	6–2	@ Chicago Blackhawks (1987–88)	11–13–4
29	T	December 12, 1987	3–3 OT	@ Boston Bruins (1987–88)	11–13–5
30	L	December 13, 1987	1–7	Calgary Flames (1987–88)	11–14–5
31	T	December 18, 1987	2–2 OT	Montreal Canadiens (1987–88)	11–14–6
32	W	December 19, 1987	2–1	@ Montreal Canadiens (1987–88)	12–14–6
33	L	December 22, 1987	0–9	@ Boston Bruins (1987–88)	12–15–6
34	W	December 23, 1987	5–2	@ Detroit Red Wings (1987–88)	13–15–6
35	T	December 27, 1987	3–3 OT	Pittsburgh Penguins (1987–88)	13–15–7
36	L	December 29, 1987	1–5	@ Quebec Nordiques (1987–88)	13–16–7
37	L	December 31, 1987	0–2	Boston Bruins (1987–88)	13–17–7

January

Game	Result	Date	Score	Opponent	Record
38	W	January 2, 1988	6–4	@ Toronto Maple Leafs (1987–88)	14–17–7
39	W	January 3, 1988	2–1	Quebec Nordiques (1987–88)	15–17–7
40	W	January 6, 1988	6–5	@ Montreal Canadiens (1987–88)	16–17–7
41	W	January 8, 1988	3–1	Hartford Whalers (1987–88)	17–17–7
42	W	January 10, 1988	4–3	New York Rangers (1987–88)	18–17–7
43	W	January 12, 1988	4–2	@ St. Louis Blues (1987–88)	19–17–7
44	L	January 14, 1988	1–3	@ Philadelphia Flyers (1987–88)	19–18–7
45	L	January 16, 1988	1–5	@ Boston Bruins (1987–88)	19–19–7
46	W	January 17, 1988	5–2	New York Islanders (1987–88)	20–19–7
47	W	January 20, 1988	5–3	Boston Bruins (1987–88)	21–19–7
48	W	January 22, 1988	7–3	New Jersey Devils (1987–88)	22–19–7
49	T	January 23, 1988	3–3 OT	@ Washington Capitals (1987–88)	22–19–8
50	W	January 25, 1988	5–2	@ New Jersey Devils (1987–88)	23–19–8
51	L	January 27, 1988	1–4	Montreal Canadiens (1987–88)	23–20–8
52	L	January 29, 1988	2–5	New York Islanders (1987–88)	23–21–8
53	T	January 31, 1988	4–4 OT	Winnipeg Jets (1987–88)	23–21–9

February

Game	Result	Date	Score	Opponent	Record
54	W	February 2, 1988	6–3	@ Quebec Nordiques (1987–88)	24–21–9
55	W	February 5, 1988	5–2	Toronto Maple Leafs (1987–88)	25–21–9
56	L	February 6, 1988	4–6	@ New York Islanders (1987–88)	25–22–9
57	L	February 12, 1988	5–7	@ Winnipeg Jets (1987–88)	25–23–9
58	L	February 14, 1988	3–4 OT	@ Chicago Blackhawks (1987–88)	25–24–9
59	W	February 16, 1988	3–0	@ St. Louis Blues (1987–88)	26–24–9
60	L	February 19, 1988	4–5	Philadelphia Flyers (1987–88)	26–25–9
61	L	February 21, 1988	5–6	Quebec Nordiques (1987–88)	26–26–9
62	W	February 25, 1988	5–2	St. Louis Blues (1987–88)	27–26–9
63	W	February 27, 1988	4–3	@ Hartford Whalers (1987–88)	28–26–9
64	W	February 28, 1988	5–3	Winnipeg Jets (1987–88)	29–26–9

March

Game	Result	Date	Score	Opponent	Record
65	L	March 1, 1988	0–4	@ Detroit Red Wings (1987–88)	29–27–9
66	W	March 4, 1988	6–3	New York Rangers (1987–88)	30–27–9
67	W	March 6, 1988	3–0	Boston Bruins (1987–88)	31–27–9
68	W	March 9, 1988	6–2	@ Minnesota North Stars (1987–88)	32–27–9
69	L	March 12, 1988	4–10	@ Calgary Flames (1987–88)	32–28–9
70	W	March 13, 1988	7–5	@ Vancouver Canucks (1987–88)	33–28–9
71	L	March 15, 1988	4–6	@ Edmonton Oilers (1987–88)	33–29–9
72	W	March 19, 1988	4–3	@ Boston Bruins (1987–88)	34–29–9
73	L	March 20, 1988	2–6	Boston Bruins (1987–88)	34–30–9
74	W	March 22, 1988	3–2	@ New York Rangers (1987–88)	35–30–9
75	T	March 25, 1988	2–2 OT	New Jersey Devils (1987–88)	35–30–10
76	L	March 27, 1988	3–5	Detroit Red Wings (1987–88)	35–31–10
77	W	March 29, 1988	3–1	@ Quebec Nordiques (1987–88)	36–31–10
78	W	March 31, 1988	3–2	Hartford Whalers (1987–88)	37–31–10

April

Game	Result	Date	Score	Opponent	Record
79	L	April 2, 1988	4–9	@ Montreal Canadiens (1987–88)	37–32–10
80	T	April 3, 1988	4–4 OT	Montreal Canadiens (1987–88)	37–32–11

Legend: Win (2 points) Loss (0 points) Tie (1 point)

== Playoffs ==
1988 Stanley Cup playoffs

Date	Away	Score	Home	Score	Notes
April 6	Buffalo	3	Boston	7	
April 7	Buffalo	1	Boston	4	
April 9	Boston	2	Buffalo	6	
April 10	Boston	5	Buffalo	6	OT
April 12	Buffalo	4	Boston	5	
April 14	Boston	5	Buffalo	2	

Boston wins best-of-seven series 4–2.

== Draft picks ==
Buffalo's draft picks at the 1987 NHL entry draft held at the Joe Louis Arena in Detroit, Michigan.

Round	#	Player	Nationality	College/Junior/Club team (League)
1	1	Pierre Turgeon	Canada	Granby Bisons (QMJHL)
2	22	Brad Miller	Canada	Regina Pats (WHL)
3	53	Andrew MacVicar	Canada	Peterborough Petes (OHL)
4	84	John Bradley	United States	New Hampton School (USHS-NH)
5	85	Dave Pergola	United States	Belmont High School (USHS-MA)
6	106	Chris Marshall	United States	Boston College High School (USHS-MA)
7	127	Paul Flanagan	United States	New Hampton School (USHS-NH)
8	148	Sean Dooley	United States	Groton School (USHS-CT)
8	153	Tim Roberts	United States	Deerfield Academy (USHS-MA)
9	169	Grant Tkachuk	Canada	Saskatoon Blades (WHL)
10	190	Ian Herbers	Canada	Swift Current Broncos (WHL)
11	211	David Littman	United States	Boston College (Hockey East)
12	232	Al MacIsaac	Canada	Guelph Platers (OHL)
S1	1	Dave Snuggerud	United States	University of Minnesota (WCHA)
S2	6	Mike DeCarle	United States	Lake Superior State University (CCHA)

== See also ==
- 1987–88 NHL season
