= Gilles Thibaudeau =

Canadian ice hockey player

- Born: March 4, 1963 (age 63) Montreal, Quebec, Canada
- Height: 5 ft 10 in (178 cm)
- Weight: 176 lb (80 kg; 12 st 8 lb)
- Position: Centre
- Shot: Left
- Played for: Montreal Canadiens; Toronto Maple Leafs; New York Islanders; HC Lugano; HC Davos; SC Rapperswil-Jona
- National team: Canada
- NHL draft: Undrafted
- Playing career: 1984–2001

Gilles Jean-Yves Thibaudeau (born March 4, 1963) is a Canadian former professional ice hockey player who played 119 games in the National Hockey League (NHL) with the Montreal Canadiens, the Toronto Maple Leafs, and the New York Islanders between 1987 and 1990. The rest of his career, which lasted from 1984 to 2001, was mainly spent in the minor leagues and then in the Swiss Nationalliga A and Nationalliga B.

== Career statistics ==
=== Regular season and playoffs ===
			Regular season					Playoffs
Season	Team	League	GP	G	A	Pts	PIM	GP	G	A	Pts	PIM
1983–84	Saint Antoine Saints	QJHL-B	38	63	77	140	146	—	—	—	—	—
1984–85	Sherbrooke Canadiens	AHL	7	2	4	6	2	—	—	—	—	—
1984–85	Flint Generals	IHL	71	52	45	97	81	7	3	1	4	18
1985–86	Sherbrooke Canadiens	AHL	61	15	21	36	20	—	—	—	—	—
1986–87	Montreal Canadiens	NHL	9	1	3	4	0	—	—	—	—	—
1986–87	Sherbrooke Canadiens	AHL	62	27	40	67	26	—	—	—	—	—
1987–88	Montreal Canadiens	NHL	17	5	6	11	0	8	3	3	6	2
1987–88	Sherbrooke Canadiens	AHL	59	39	57	96	45	—	—	—	—	—
1988–89	Montreal Canadiens	NHL	32	6	6	12	6	—	—	—	—	—
1989–90	Toronto Maple Leafs	NHL	21	7	11	18	13	—	—	—	—	—
1989–90	New York Islanders	NHL	20	4	4	8	17	—	—	—	—	—
1989–90	Newmarket Saints	AHL	10	7	13	20	4	—	—	—	—	—
1989–90	Springfield Indians	AHL	6	5	8	13	0	—	—	—	—	—
1990–91	Toronto Maple Leafs	NHL	20	2	7	9	4	—	—	—	—	—
1990–91	Newmarket Saints	AHL	60	34	37	71	28	—	—	—	—	—
1991–92	HC Lugano	NLA	33	30	18	48	12	4	6	2	8	2
1992–93	HC Davos	NLB	36	51	25	76	18	7	7	4	11	6
1993–94	HC Davos	NLA	36	30	16	46	6	4	2	0	2	6
1994–95	HC Davos	NLA	36	17	20	37	24	5	5	4	9	0
1994–95	Canadian National Team	Intl	3	1	1	2	0	—	—	—	—	—
1995–96	SC Rapperswil-Jona	NLA	36	26	27	53	12	4	4	1	5	4
1996–97	SC Rapperswil-Jona	NLA	45	24	14	38	26	3	0	1	1	25
1997–98	SC Rapperswil-Jona	NLA	40	18	29	47	32	7	6	3	9	2
1998–99	HC Sierre	NLB	35	21	25	46	22	3	2	1	3	2
1999–00	HC Sierre	NLB	35	23	19	42	40	2	0	0	0	0
2000–01	Chiefs de Laval	QSPHL	23	10	9	19	8	12	1	3	4	4
AHL totals			265	129	180	309	125	—	—	—	—	—
NLA totals			226	145	124	269	112	27	23	11	34	39
NHL totals			119	25	37	62	40	8	3	3	6	2
