= Alan Kerr =

Canadian ice hockey player

- Born: March 28, 1964 (age 62) Hazelton, British Columbia, Canada
- Height: 5 ft 11 in (180 cm)
- Weight: 195 lb (88 kg; 13 st 13 lb)
- Position: Right wing
- Shot: Right
- Played for: New York Islanders; Detroit Red Wings; Winnipeg Jets
- NHL draft: 84th overall, 1982; New York Islanders
- Playing career: 1984–1993

Alan G. "Al" Kerr (born March 28, 1964) is a Canadian former professional ice hockey forward. He is currently the head coach and general manager of the Alberni Valley Bulldogs BCHL team.

Kerr started his National Hockey League career with the New York Islanders in 1984. He also played for the Detroit Red Wings and Winnipeg Jets. He left the NHL after the 1993 season.

== Career statistics ==
			Regular season					Playoffs
Season	Team	League	GP	G	A	Pts	PIM	GP	G	A	Pts	PIM
1981–82	Seattle Breakers	WHL	68	15	18	33	107	10	6	6	12	32
1982–83	Seattle Breakers	WHL	71	38	53	91	183	4	2	3	5	0
1983–84	Seattle Breakers	WHL	66	46	66	112	141	5	1	4	5	12
1984–85	New York Islanders	NHL	19	3	1	4	24	4	1	0	1	4
1984–85	Springfield Indians	AHL	62	32	27	59	140	4	1	2	3	2
1985–86	New York Islanders	NHL	7	0	1	1	16	1	0	0	0	0
1985–86	Springfield Indians	AHL	71	35	36	71	127	—	—	—	—	—
1986–87	New York Islanders	NHL	72	7	10	17	175	14	1	4	5	25
1987–88	New York Islanders	NHL	80	24	34	58	198	6	1	0	1	14
1988–89	New York Islanders	NHL	71	20	18	38	144	—	—	—	—	—
1989–90	New York Islanders	NHL	75	15	21	36	129	4	0	0	0	10
1990–91	New York Islanders	NHL	2	0	0	0	5	—	—	—	—	—
1990–91	Capital District Islanders	AHL	43	11	21	32	131	—	—	—	—	—
1991–92	Detroit Red Wings	NHL	58	3	8	11	133	9	2	0	2	17
1992–93	Winnipeg Jets	NHL	7	0	1	1	2	—	—	—	—	—
1992–93	Moncton Hawks	AHL	36	6	10	16	85	5	0	2	2	11
NHL totals			391	72	94	166	826	38	5	4	9	70

== Awards ==
- WHL West First All-Star Team – 1984
