= Sam St. Laurent =

Canadian ice hockey player (born 1959)

- Born: February 16, 1959 (age 67) Arvida, Quebec, Canada
- Height: 5 ft 10 in (178 cm)
- Weight: 190 lb (86 kg; 13 st 8 lb)
- Position: Goaltender
- Caught: Left
- Played for: New Jersey Devils; Detroit Red Wings
- National team: Canada
- NHL draft: Undrafted
- Playing career: 1979–1992

Sam St. Laurent (born February 16, 1959) is a Canadian former professional ice hockey goaltender who played 34 games in the National Hockey League between 1986 and 1990 as well as on the Canadian national men's hockey team. St. Laurent was the last NHL goaltender to wear a mask made entirely out of fiberglass.

== Playing career ==
=== Junior Career ===
St. Laurent was born in Arvida, Quebec. As a youth, he played in the 1972 Quebec International Pee-Wee Hockey Tournament with a minor ice hockey team from Arvida. He began his career playing for the Chicoutimi Saguenéens of the QMJHL from the 1975–76 season until the 1978–79 season, playing in 70 games during his final season in the juniors.

=== Professional career ===
==== Philadelphia Flyers ====
On 10 October 1979, St. Laurent signed with the Philadelphia Flyers organization. From the 1979–80 seasons until the 1983–84 seasons, he spent his time assigned to the minors. St. Laurent played for both the Toledo Goaldiggers of the IHL and the Maine Mariners of the AHL, where he was part of the Calder Cup-winning team during the 1983–84 season.

==== New Jersey Devils ====
The Flyers traded St. Laurent to the New Jersey Devils on 27 September 1984 for future considerations (though he remained with the Mariners while assigned to the AHL.) St. Laurent's first NHL game was on 4 January 1986, where he replaced (and was subsequently replaced by) Glenn "Chico" Resch in a stunning 9–3 loss to the Washington Capitals. After a brief reassignment to the minors, St. Laurent was recalled and given his first NHL start on 27 March 1986, making 24 saves to earn a 1–0 shutout victory. He went on to post a 2–1 record with the Devils that season. On a minor league level, he won the Aldege "Baz" Bastien Memorial Award for the AHL's best goaltender and shared the Harry "Hap" Holmes Memorial Award with Karl Friesen for having the lowest team GAA in the AHL.

==== Detroit Red Wings ====
The Detroit Red Wings acquired St. Laurent from New Jersey for Steve Richmond on 18 August 1986. St. Laurent enjoyed a particular level of success with their minor league affiliate Adirondack Red Wings of the AHL, winning the Calder Cup with them during the 1988–89 season, as well as receiving the Jack A. Butterfield Trophy for the MVP during the Calder Cup playoffs that same year. From the 1986–87 season to the 1989–90 season, St. Laurent posted a cumulative 5–11–4 record with 3.42 GAA and a .887 save percentage in 30 regular season appearances with the Detroit Red Wings. He appeared in a playoff game on 14 April 1988, where he was injured after allowing one goal in what eventually became a 5–3 Red Wings victory over the Toronto Maple Leafs (Greg Stefan finished the game in St. Laurent's place.)

==== New York Rangers ====
With the emergence of Tim Cheveldae from the Red Wings' depth chart, St. Laurent was traded to the New York Rangers for cash on 26 June 1990. For the 1990–91 season, St. Laurent spent his time with the Binghamton Rangers of the AHL. He appeared in one game for the Binghamton Rangers during the 1991–92 season before leaving professional hockey.

=== International career ===
St. Laurent joined the Canadian men's national team to support Canada's ambition to win an Olympic medal at the 1992 Winter Olympics (as NHL players were not permitted to compete in Olympic games until 1995). After playing his entire career wearing a fibreglass mask, he finally donned a modern-style mask as a member of the Canadian Olympic team. St. Laurent became the veteran third-string goaltender behind Sean Burke (who was in the midst of a contract dispute) and Trevor Kidd, a then-drafted prospect for the Calgary Flames. The team succeeded an winning the silver medal, which was their first medal in ice hockey since 1968. St. Laurent retired as a professional hockey player following the Olympics.

== Coaching career ==
St. Laurent went on to become a goaltender coach/consultant for the Rangers organization from 1993–2004, helping the organization develop such goalies as Mike Richter, Henrik Lundqvist, and Dan Cloutier. Jason Labarbera, who began his career as a member of the Rangers organization, credits St. Laurent for his development in the Rangers organization despite the presence of highly regarded goaltender coach Benoit Allaire. He was also a consultant for the Sinupret Ice Tigers of the German Deutsche Eishockey Liga for the 2005–06 season.

== Career statistics ==
=== Regular season and playoffs ===
			Regular season									Playoffs
Season	Team	League	GP	W	L	T	MIN	GA	SO	GAA	SV%	GP	W	L	MIN	GA	SO	GAA	SV%
1975–76	Chicoutimi Saguenéens	QMJHL	17	4	8	2	889	81	0	5.47	.851	1	0	0	40	9	0	13.50	.667
1976–77	Chicoutimi Saguenéens	QMJHL	21	5	9	0	901	0	81	5.39	.851	4	2	1	200	19	0	5.70	.835
1977–78	Chicoutimi Saguenéens	QMJHL	60	12	35	9	3251	351	0	6.48	.834	—	—	—	—	—	—	—	—
1978–79	Chicoutimi Saguenéens	QMJHL	70	23	31	9	3806	290	0	4.57	.871	1	0	1	47	8	0	10.21	.750
1979–80	Maine Mariners	AHL	5	2	1	0	229	17	0	4.45	.879	—	—	—	—	—	—	—	—
1979–80	Toledo Goaldiggers	IHL	38	—	—	—	2143	138	2	3.86	—	4	0	4	239	24	0	6.03	—
1980–81	Maine Mariners	AHL	7	3	3	0	363	28	0	4.63	.855	—	—	—	—	—	—	—	—
1980–81	Toledo Goaldiggers	IHL	30	—	—	—	1614	113	1	4.20	—	—	—	—	—	—	—	—	—
1981–82	Toledo Goaldiggers	IHL	4	—	—	—	248	11	0	2.66	—	—	—	—	—	—	—	—	—
1981–82	Maine Mariners	AHL	25	15	7	1	1396	76	0	3.27	—	4	1	3	240	18	0	4.50	—
1982–83	Toledo Goaldiggers	IHL	13	—	—	—	785	52	0	3.97	—	—	—	—	—	—	—	—	—
1982–83	Maine Mariners	AHL	30	12	12	4	1739	109	0	3.76	—	17	8	9	1012	54	0	3.20	—
1983–84	Maine Mariners	AHL	38	14	18	4	2158	145	0	4.03	.866	12	9	2	708	32	1	2.71	—
1984–85	Maine Mariners	AHL	55	26	22	7	3245	168	4	3.11	.886	10	5	5	45	0	4.12	—
1985–86	New Jersey Devils	NHL	4	2	1	0	188	13	1	4.15	.883	—	—	—	—	—	—	—	—
1985–86	Maine Mariners	AHL	50	24	20	4	2862	161	1	3.38	.882	—	—	—	—	—	—	—	—
1986–87	Detroit Red Wings	NHL	6	1	2	2	342	16	0	2.81	.881	—	—	—	—	—	—	—	—
1986–87	Adirondack Red Wings	AHL	25	7	13	0	1397	98	1	4.21	.885	3	0	2	105	10	0	5.71	—
1987–88	Detroit Red Wings	NHL	6	2	2	0	294	16	0	3.27	.892	1	0	0	11	1	0	5.82	.857
1987–88	Adirondack Red Wings	AHL	32	12	14	4	1826	104	2	3.42	.884	1	0	1	59	6	0	6.10	—
1988–89	Detroit Red Wings	NHL	4	0	1	1	141	9	0	3.83	.901	—	—	—	—	—	—	—	—
1988–89	Adirondack Red Wings	AHL	34	20	11	3	2054	113	0	3.30	.895	16	11	5	956	47	2	2.95	—
1989–90	Detroit Red Wings	NHL	14	2	6	1	607	38	0	3.76	.883	—	—	—	—	—	—	—	—
1989–90	Adirondack Red Wings	AHL	13	10	2	1	785	40	0	3.06	.901	—	—	—	—	—	—	—	—
1990–91	Binghamton Rangers	AHL	45	19	16	4	2379	138	1	3.48	.894	3	1	2	160	11	0	4.13	—
1991–92	Binghamton Rangers	AHL	1	0	0	0	20	2	0	6.00	.800	—	—	—	—	—	—	—	—
NHL totals			34	7	12	4	1572	92	1	3.51	.886	1	0	0	11	1	0	5.82	.857

Awards and achievements
Preceded by Jon Casey	Aldege "Baz" Bastien Memorial Award; 1985–86	Succeeded by Mark Laforest
