= Bill Root (ice hockey) =

Canadian ice hockey player

- Born: September 6, 1959 (age 65); Toronto, Ontario, Canada
- Height: 6 ft 0 in (183 cm)
- Weight: 210 lb (95 kg; 15 st 0 lb)
- Position: Defence
- Shot: Right
- Played for: Montreal Canadiens; Toronto Maple Leafs; St. Louis Blues; Philadelphia Flyers
- NHL draft: Undrafted
- Playing career: 1979–1991

William John Root (born September 6, 1959) is a Canadian retired professional ice hockey defenceman who played six seasons in the National Hockey League (NHL) with the Montreal Canadiens, Toronto Maple Leafs, St. Louis Blues and Philadelphia Flyers between 1982 and 1988. As a youth, he played in the 1972 Quebec International Pee-Wee Hockey Tournament with a minor ice hockey team from Toronto.

== Career statistics ==
=== Regular season and playoffs ===
			Regular season					Playoffs
Season	Team	League	GP	G	A	Pts	PIM	GP	G	A	Pts	PIM
1976–77	Niagara Falls Flyers	OMJHL	66	3	19	22	114	—	—	—	—	—
1977–78	Niagara Falls Flyers	OMJHL	67	6	11	17	61	—	—	—	—	—
1978–79	Niagara Falls Flyers	OMJHL	67	4	31	35	119	20	4	7	11	42
1979–80	Nova Scotia Voyageurs	AHL	55	4	15	19	57	6	1	1	2	2
1980–81	Nova Scotia Voyageurs	AHL	63	3	12	15	76	6	0	1	1	2
1981–82	Nova Scotia Voyageurs	AHL	77	6	25	31	105	9	1	0	1	4
1982–83	Montreal Canadiens	NHL	46	2	3	5	24	—	—	—	—	—
1982–83	Nova Scotia Voyageurs	AHL	24	0	7	7	29	—	—	—	—	—
1983–84	Montreal Canadiens	NHL	72	4	13	17	45	—	—	—	—	—
1984–85	Toronto Maple Leafs	NHL	35	1	1	2	23	—	—	—	—	—
1984–85	St. Catharines Saints	AHL	28	5	9	14	10	—	—	—	—	—
1985–86	Toronto Maple Leafs	NHL	27	0	1	1	29	7	0	2	2	13
1985–86	St. Catharines Saints	AHL	14	7	4	11	11	—	—	—	—	—
1986–87	Toronto Maple Leafs	NHL	34	3	3	6	37	13	1	0	1	12
1986–87	Newmarket Saints	AHL	32	4	11	15	23	—	—	—	—	—
1987–88	St. Louis Blues	NHL	9	0	0	0	6	—	—	—	—	—
1987–88	Philadelphia Flyers	NHL	24	1	2	3	16	2	0	0	0	0
1988–89	Newmarket Saints	AHL	66	10	22	32	39	5	0	0	0	18
1989–90	Newmarket Saints	AHL	47	8	7	15	20	—	—	—	—	—
1990–91	Newmarket Saints	AHL	36	2	4	6	39	—	—	—	—	—
NHL totals			247	11	23	34	180	22	1	2	3	25
