= 1987 NHL supplemental draft =

Player selection draft

General information
- Date(s): June 13, 1987

Overview
- 21 total selections in 2 rounds
- First selection: (United States) Dave Snuggerud (Buffalo Sabres)

The 1987 NHL supplemental draft was the second NHL supplemental draft. It was held on June 13, 1987.

== Selections by round ==
=== Round one ===
The first round was limited to teams that missed the 1987 Stanley Cup playoffs.

Pick #	Player	Nationality	NHL team	College (league)
1	Dave Snuggerud (RW)	United States	Buffalo Sabres	University of Minnesota (WCHA)
2	Johnny Walker (LW)	Canada	New Jersey Devils	Northern Alberta Institute of Technology (CIAU)
3	Steve Johnson (F)	United States	Vancouver Canucks	University of North Dakota (WCHA)
4	Shawn Chambers (D)	United States	Minnesota North Stars	University of Alaska Fairbanks (CCHA)
5	Dan Shea (LW)	United States	Pittsburgh Penguins	Boston College (Hockey East)

=== Round two ===
Pick #	Player	Nationality	NHL team	College (league)
6	Mike DeCarle (RW)	United States	Buffalo Sabres	Lake Superior State University (CCHA)
7	Jeff Madill (RW)	Canada	New Jersey Devils	Ohio State University (CCHA)
— (Note: Invalid claim. Gillies entered school after age 20 and therefore did not meet eligibility requirements.)	Chris Gillies (G)	United States	Vancouver Canucks	University of Denver (WCHA)
8	Rick Boh (C)	Canada	Minnesota North Stars	Colorado College (WCHA)
9	John Leonard (D)	United States	Pittsburgh Penguins	Bowdoin College (ECAC East)
10	Chris Panek (D)	United States	Los Angeles Kings	SUNY Plattsburgh (ECAC West)
— (Note: Invalid claim. Paranica entered school after age 20 and therefore did not meet eligibility requirements.)	Grant Paranica (RW)	Canada	Toronto Maple Leafs	University of North Dakota (WCHA)
— (Note: Invalid claim. Pizzey hadn’t turned age 21 yet and therefore did not meet eligibility requirements.)	Derek Pizzey (G)	Canada	Chicago Blackhawks	Colorado College (WCHA)
11	Mike Hiltner (F)	United States	Quebec Nordiques	University of Alaska Anchorage (GWHC)
12	Joe Lockwood (RW)	United States	New York Rangers	University of Michigan (CCHA)
13	Mike LaMoine (D)	United States	Detroit Red Wings	University of North Dakota (WCHA)
— (Note: Invalid claim. Foley entered school after age 20 and therefore did not meet eligibility requirements.)	Tim Foley (D)	United States	St. Louis Blues	University of Massachusetts Lowell (Hockey East)
14	Howie Vandermast (D)	United States	New York Islanders	SUNY Potsdam (ECAC West)
15	Mike Jeffrey (G)	Canada	Boston Bruins	Northern Michigan University (WCHA)
16	Mark Anderson (F)	United States	Washington Capitals	Ohio State University (CCHA)
17	Rob Fowler (F)	United States	Winnipeg Jets	Merrimack College (ECAC East)
18	Wayne Gagne (D)	Canada	Montreal Canadiens	Western Michigan University (CCHA)
19	Ken Lovsin (D)	Canada	Hartford Whalers	University of Saskatchewan (CIAU)
20	Peter Lappin (RW)	United States	Calgary Flames	Saint Lawrence University (ECAC)
21	David Whyte (F)	United States	Philadelphia Flyers	Boston College (Hockey East)
— (Note: Invalid claim. Wensley entered school after age 20 and therefore did not meet eligibility requirements.)	Dave Wensley (F)	Canada	Edmonton Oilers	University of Maine (Hockey East)

== See also ==
- 1987 NHL entry draft
- 1987–88 NHL season
- List of NHL players
