= 1987–88 Washington Capitals season =

Washington Capitals in 1987–88

1987–88 Washington Capitals
- Division: 2nd Patrick
- Conference: 4th Wales
- 1987–88 record: 38–33–9
- Home record: 22–14–4
- Road record: 16–19–5
- Goals for: 281
- Goals against: 249

Team information
- General manager: David Poile
- Coach: Bryan Murray
- Captain: Rod Langway
- Arena: Capital Centre

Team leaders
- Goals: Mike Gartner (48)
- Assists: Scott Stevens (60)
- Points: Mike Gartner (81)
- Penalty minutes: Dale Hunter (240)
- Plus/minus: Mike Gartner (+20)
- Wins: Clint Malarchuk (24)
- Goals against average: Pete Peeters (2.79)

The 1987–88 Washington Capitals season was the Washington Capitals 14th season in the National Hockey League (NHL).

== Regular season ==
The Capitals had the most shutouts in the league with six and were the least penalized team in the league, being short-handed only 394 times.

=== Final standings ===
Patrick Division
	GP	W	L	T	GF	GA	Pts
**New York Islanders**	80	39	31	10	308	267	88
**Philadelphia Flyers**	80	38	33	9	292	292	85
**Washington Capitals**	80	38	33	9	281	249	85
**New Jersey Devils**	80	38	36	6	295	296	82
New York Rangers	80	36	34	10	300	283	82
Pittsburgh Penguins	80	36	35	9	319	316	81

Note: GP = Games played, W = Wins, L = Losses, T = Ties, Pts = Points, GF = Goals for, GA = Goals against
Note: Teams that qualified for the playoffs are highlighted in bold.

=== Record vs. opponents ===
Patrick Division record vs. opponents

==== Vs. Wales Conference ====
**Vs. Patrick Division**

1987–88 NHL records
Team	**NJD**	**NYI**	**NYR**	**PHI**	**PIT**	**WSH**	**Total**
New Jersey	—	3–4	3–4	5–0–2	6–1	2–5	19–14–2
N.Y. Islanders	4–3	—	2–2–3	3–3–1	2–4–1	4–2–1	15–14–6
N.Y. Rangers	4–3	2–2–3	—	3–3–1	2–3–2	2–5	13–16–6
Philadelphia	0–5–2	3–3–1	3–3–1	—	5–2	2–4–1	13–17–5
Pittsburgh	1–6	4–2–1	3–2–2	2–5	—	5–1–1	15–16–4
Washington	5–2	2–4–1	5–2	4–2–1	1–5–1	—	17–15–3

**Vs. Adams Division**

1987–88 NHL records
Team	**BOS**	**BUF**	**HFD**	**MTL**	**QUE**	**Total**
New Jersey	1–2	0–2–1	1–1–1	2–1	0–3	4–9–2
N.Y. Islanders	2–1	2–1	2–1	0–3	2–1	8–7–0
N.Y. Rangers	2–1	0–3	2–1	1–1–1	2–1	7–7–1
Philadelphia	2–1	3–0	2–1	0–1–2	2–0–1	9–3–3
Pittsburgh	0–2–1	2–0–1	2–1	2–1	3–0	9–4–2
Washington	2–1	0–2–1	2–1	1–1–1	2–1	7–6–2

==== Vs. Campbell Conference ====
**Vs. Norris Division**

1987–88 NHL records
Team	**CHI**	**DET**	**MIN**	**STL**	**TOR**	**Total**
New Jersey	3–0	0–3	3–0	3–0	2–1	11–4–0
N.Y. Islanders	0–1–2	1–2	1–1–1	2–0–1	0–3	4–7–4
N.Y. Rangers	2–0–1	1–1–1	2–1	3–0	2–1	10–3–2
Philadelphia	0–3	2–0–1	2–1	2–1	1–2	7–7–1
Pittsburgh	2–1	1–2	2–1	0–3	2–1	7–8–0
Washington	2–1	0–2–1	2–0–1	0–2–1	1–1–1	5–6–4

**Vs. Smythe Division**

1987–88 NHL records
Team	**CGY**	**EDM**	**LAK**	**VAN**	**WIN**	**Total**
New Jersey	1–2	2–1	1–1–1	0–3	0–2–1	4–9–2
N.Y. Islanders	2–1	2–1	3–0	3–0	2–1	12–3–0
N.Y. Rangers	1–2	1–2	0–3	2–1	2–0–1	6–8–1
Philadelphia	0–3	1–2	3–0	2–1	3–0	9–6–0
Pittsburgh	2–0–1	0–3	1–0–2	1–2	1–2	5–7–3
Washington	1–2	2–1	2–1	3–0	1–2	9–6–0

== Schedule and results ==
1987–88 game log
October: 6–4–1 (home: 3–1–0; road: 3–3–1)

#	Date	Visitor	Score	Home	OT	Decision	Location	Attendance	Record	Points	Recap
1	October 8	Washington	3–4	Boston)		Malarchuk	Boston Garden	13,104	0–1–0	0	L1
2	October 10	Chicago	4–6	Washington		Malarchuk	Capital Centre		1–1–0	2	W1
3	October 11	Washington	5–6	Buffalo		Peeters	Buffalo Memorial Auditorium		1–2–0	2	L1
4	October 16	Hartford	2–6	Washington		Malarchuk	Capital Centre		2–2–0	4	W1
5	October 17	NY Rangers	3–4	Washington		Malarchuk	Capital Centre		3–2–0	6	W2
6	October 19	Washington	4–2	NY Rangers		Malarchuk	Madison Square Garden		4–2–0	8	W3
7	October 22	Washington	4–1	Philadelphia		Malarchuk	Spectrum		5–2–0	10	W4
8	October 24	Montreal	3–2	Washington		Malarchuk	Capital Centre		5–3–0	10	L1
9	October 27	Washington	3–2	Vancouver		Peeters	Pacific Coliseum		6–3–0	12	W1
10	October 30	Washington	2–3	Winnipeg	OT	Malarchuk	Winnipeg Arena		6–4–0	12	L1
11	October 31	Washington	3–3	Minnesota	OT	Malarchuk	Met Center		6–4–1	13	T1

November: 4–7–1 (home: 3–3–0; road: 1–4–1)

#	Date	Visitor	Score	Home	OT	Decision	Location	Attendance	Record	Points	Recap
12	November 3	Vancouver	2–3	Washington		Peeters	Capital Centre		7–4–1	13	W1
13	November 6	Quebec	4–1	Washington		Malarchuk	Capital Centre		7–5–1	13	L1
14	November 7	Washington	1–4	New Jersey		Peeters	Brendan Byrne Arena	16,347	7–6–1	13	L2
15	November 10	Washington	3–4	NY Islanders	OT	Malarchuk	Nassau Coliseum		7–7–1	15	L3
16	November 11	Washington	2–3	Pittsburgh		Malarchuk	Pittsburgh Civic Arena		7–8–1	15	L4
17	November 14	Minnesota	1–4	Washington		Peeters	Capital Centre		8–8–1	17	W1
18	November 17	Detroit	1–0	Washington		Peeters	Capital Center	12,729	8–9–1	17	L1
19	November 20	Washington	3–5	Buffalo		Peeters	Buffalo Memorial Auditorium		8–10–1	17	L2
20	November 21	Washington	4–3	Hartford		Malarchuk	Hartford Civic Center		9–10–1	19	W1
21	November 25	Boston	1–4	Washington		Malarchuk	Capital Centre	15,844	10–10–1	21	W2
22	November 27	Pittsburgh	4–2	Washington		Malarchuk	Capital Centre		10–11–1	21	L1
23	November 28	Washington	5–5	Pittsburgh	OT	Malarchuk	Pittsburgh Civic Arena		10–11–2	22	T1

December: 6–6–3 (home: 4–3–1; road: 2–3–2)

#	Date	Visitor	Score	Home	OT	Decision	Location	Attendance	Record	Points	Recap
24	December 1	Edmonton	2–4	Washington		Malarchuk	Capital Centre	17,342	11–11–2	24	W1
25	December 4	NY Islanders	6–4	Washington		Malarchuk	Capital Centre		11–12–2	24	L1
26	December 6	Los Angeles	3–10	Washington		Malarchuk	Capital Centre		12–12–2	26	W1
27	December 8	Calgary	5–4	Washington		Malarchuk	Capital Centre		12–13–2	26	L1
28	December 9	Washington	4–5	Hartford		Raymond	Hartford Civic Center		12–14–2	26	L2
29	December 12	Chicago	1–2	Washington		Peeters	Capital Centre		13–14–2	28	W1
30	December 15	Washington	3–5	Toronto		Peeters	Maple Leaf Gardens		13–15–2	28	L1
31	December 16	Washington	1–6	Detroit		Malarchuk	Joe Louis Arena	19,293	13–16–2	28	L2
32	December 18	Toronto	2–4	Washington		Peeters	Capital Centre		14–16–2	30	W1
33	December 20	St. Louis	1–1	Washington	OT	Peeters	Capital Centre		14–16–3	31	T1
34	December 22	Washington	2–1	Quebec		Peeters	Quebec Coliseum		15–16–3	33	W1
35	December 23	Washington	2–2	Montreal	OT	Peeters	Montreal Forum		15–16–4	34	T1
36	December 26	Philadelphia	3–2	Washington		Malarchuk	Capital Centre		15–17–4	34	L1
37	December 28	Washington	4–4	Toronto	OT	Malarchuk	Maple Leaf Gardens		15–17–5	35	T1
38	December 30	Washington	4–3	New Jersey		Malarchuk	Brendan Byrne Arena	19,040	16–17–5	37	W1

January: 8–5–1 (home: 0–0–1; road: 0–0–0)

#	Date	Visitor	Score	Home	OT	Decision	Location	Attendance	Record	Points	Recap
39	January 1	Pittsburgh	3–5	Washington		Malarchuk	Capital Centre		17–17–5	39	W2
40	January 2	Edmonton	0–2	Washington		Malarchuk	Capital Centre	18,130	18–17–5	41	W3
41	January 5	Washington	3–1	Philadelphia		Malarchuk	Spectrum		19–17–5	43	W4
42	January 8	NY Rangers	4–8	Washington		Malarchuk	Capital Centre		20–17–5	45	W5
43	January 10	Washington	2–8	Calgary		Peeters	Olympic Saddledome		20–18–5	45	L1
44	January 11	Washington	2–3	Edmonton		Malarchuk	Northlands Coliseum	16,315	20–19–5	45	L2
45	January 13	Washington	8–3	Los Angeles		Malarchuk	The Forum		21–19–5	47	W1
46	January 16	Washington	1–3	St. Louis		Malarchuk	St. Louis Arena		21–20–5	47	L1
47	January 17	Washington	4–5	Chicago		Malarchuk	Chicago Stadium		21–21–5	47	L2
48	January 19	New Jersey	4–6	Washington		Peeters	Capital Centre	12,501	22–21–5	49	W1
49	January 23	Buffalo	3–3	Washington	OT		Capital Centre		22–21–6	50	T1
50	January 26	Winnipeg	3–2	Washington		Malarchuk	Capital Centre		22–22–6	50	L1
51	January 29	Montreal	3–4	Washington		Peeters	Capital Centre		23–22–6	52	W1
52	January 31	Philadelphia	0–1	Washington	OT	Peeters	Capital Centre		24–22–6	54	W2

February: 7–4–0 (home: 0–0–0; road: 0–0–0)

#	Date	Visitor	Score	Home	OT	Decision	Location	Attendance	Record	Points	Recap
53	February 2	Washington	2–3	Pittsburgh	OT	Peeters	Pittsburgh Civic Arena		24–23–6	54	L1
54	February 5	NY Islanders	4–2	Washington		Peeters	Capital Centre		24–24–6	54	L2
55	February 6	NY Rangers	3–0	Washington		Malarchuk	Capital Centre		24–25–6	54	L3
56	February 11	Washington	5–3	NY Rangers		Peeters	Madison Square Garden		25–25–6	56	W1
57	February 12	NY Islanders	2–6	Washington		Peeters	Capital Centre		26–25–6	58	W2
58	February 14	Calgary	4–5	Washington	OT	Peeters	Capital Centre		27–25–6	60	W3
59	February 17	Washington	4–3	New Jersey		Malarchuk	Brendan Byrne Arena	10,009	28–25–6	62	W4
60	February 19	Washington	6–0	Winnipeg		Malarchuk	Winnipeg Arena		29–25–6	64	W5
61	February 20	Washington	3–0	Minnesota		Malarchuk	Met Center		30–25–6	66	W6
62	February 24	Washington	3–4	Los Angeles		Malarchuk	The Forum		30–26–6	66	L1
63	February 27	Washington	3–0	NY Islanders		Malarchuk	Nassau Coliseum		31–26–6	68	W1

March: 7–6–2 (home: 4–3–2; road: 3–3–0)

#	Date	Visitor	Score	Home	OT	Decision	Location	Attendance	Record	Points	Recap
64	March 1	New Jersey	3–5	Washington		Malarchuk	Capital Centre	14,281	32–26–6	70	W2
65	March 2	Washington	6–1	New Jersey		Malarchuk	Brendan Byrne Arena	12,760	33–26–6	72	W3
66	March 4	Quebec	2–6	Washington		Malarchuk	Capital Centre		34–26–6	74	W4
67	March 6	Vancouver	2–7	Washington		Malarchuk	Capital Centre		35–26–6	76	W5
68	March 10	Washington	2–5	Philadelphia		Malarchuk	Spectrum		35–27–6	76	L1
69	March 12	NY Rangers	4–2	Washington		Peeters	Capital Centre		35–28–6	76	L2
70	March 13	Washington	3–0	Boston		Peeters	Boston Garden	14,130	36–28–6	78	W1
71	March 16	Washington	8–4	NY Rangers		Peeters	Madison Square Garden		37–28–6	80	W2
72	March 18	NY Islanders	3–3	Washington	OT	Malarchuk	Capital Centre		37–28–7	81	T1
73	March 20	New Jersey	4–2	Washington		Malarchuk	Capital Centre	18,130	37–29–7	81	L1
73	March 22	New Jersey	5–3	Washington		Peeters	Capital Centre		37–30–7	81	L2
75	March 23	Washington	1–7	Pittsburgh		Peeters	Pittsburgh Civic Arena		37–31–7	81	L3
76	March 25	Philadelphia	3–5	Washington		Malarchuk	Capital Centre		38–31–7	83	W1
77	March 29	Detroit	2–2	Washington	OT	Peeters	Capital Centre	18,130	38–31–8	84	T1
78	March 31	Washington	3–7	NY Islanders		Peeters	Nassau Coliseum		38–32–8	84	L1

April: 0–1–1 (home: 0–1–0; road: 0–0–1)

#	Date	Visitor	Score	Home	OT	Decision	Location	Attendance	Record	Points	Recap
79	April 2	Pittsburgh	7–6	Washington	OT	Malarchuk	Capital Centre		38–33–8	84	L2
80	April 3	Washington	2–2	Philadelphia	OT	Peeters	Spectrum		38–33–9	85	T1

Win (2 points) Loss (0 points) Tie (1 point)

=== Playoffs ===
1988 Stanley Cup playoffs
Patrick Division Semifinals vs (P3) Philadelphia Flyers: Washington won 4–3

#	Date	Visitor	Score	Home	OT	Decision	Location	Attendance	Series	Recap
1	April 6	Philadelphia	4–2	Washington		Peeters	Capital Centre		Flyers lead 1–0	L1
2	April 7	Philadelphia	4–5	Washington		Peeters	Capital Centre		Series tied 1–1	W1
3	April 9	Washington	3–4	Philadelphia		Peeters	Spectrum		Flyers lead 2–1	L1
4	April 10	Washington	4–5	Philadelphia	OT	Malarchuk	Spectrum		Flyers lead 3–1	L2
5	April 12	Philadelphia	2–5	Washington		Peeters	Capital Centre		Flyers lead 3–2	W1
6	April 14	Washington	7–2	Philadelphia		Peeters	Spectrum		Series tied 3–3	W2
7	April 16	Philadelphia	4–5	Washington	OT	Peeters	Capital Centre		Capitals win 4–3	W3

Patrick Division Finals vs (P4) New Jersey Devils: New Jersey won 4–3

#	Date	Visitor	Score	Home	OT	Decision	Location	Attendance	Series	Recap
1	April 18	New Jersey	1–3	Washington		Peeters	Capital Centre	16,710	Capitals lead 1–0	W1
2	April 20	New Jersey	5–2	Washington		Peeters	Capital Centre	18,130	Series tied 1–1	L1
3	April 22	Washington	4–10	New Jersey		Peeters	Brendan Byrne Arena	19,096	Devils lead 2–1	L2
4	April 24	Washington	4–1	New Jersey		Peeters	Brendan Byrne Arena	19,096	Series tied 2–2	W1
5	April 26	New Jersey	3–1	Washington		Malarchuk	Capital Centre	18,130	Devils lead 3–2	L1
6	April 28	Washington	7–2	New Jersey		Peeters	Brendan Byrne Arena	19,096	Series tied 3–3	W1
7	April 30	New Jersey	3–2	Washington		Peeters	Capital Centre	18,130	Devils win 4–3	L1

Win Loss

== Playoffs ==
Defenseman Garry Galley's crucial two-goal performance tied the regular season finale with Philadelphia, meant that Washington won the head-to-head tiebreaker and finished second in the Patrick Division, giving them home-ice advantage in their first-round match-up with the defending division and Wales Conference champion Flyers.

Philly showed a champion's mettle right away, though, stealing home ice away with a 4–2 victory in Game 1. Ron Hextall made 35 saves and Dave Poulin's 3rd period power play tally broke a 2–2 tie. Washington salvaged a split at home with a 5–4 triumph in Game 2. Despite letting in a quartet of Philly goals, Pete Peeters proved to be the final period hero, stopping 14 of 15 shots from a pressing Flyers attack.

Philadelphia then turned the tables back at their place, taking a pair of one-goal games, both of them high in drama for entirely different reasons. In Game 3, a 4–3 Flyers win, officials handed out 40 penalties, including 10 major/misconduct penalties. After the game Philly forward Rick Tocchet, who spent roughly half the contest in the penalty box, was quoted as saying, "There are 10 guys on that team that I'd like to kill."

The rivalry heated up further in Game 4 as both teams tried to change momentum with goalie switches. The Capitals yanked Peeters in favor of starting Clint Malarchuk, who had played more during the regular season. Despite missing starting defenseman Scott Stevens and team captain Rod Langway, who were injured in Game 3, the move seemed to be paying dividends as Washington took a 4–1 lead with 17:00 to go, resulting in Hextall's removal for backup Mark Laforest. The Caps maintained their 3-goal advantage into the final 9:00 of the game, when the Flyers began one of their most riveting comebacks in franchise history. Mark Howe and Brian Propp scored to cut the deficit to one and then, after pulling their new netminder, the tying tally came from defenseman Kjell Samuelsson with :53 remaining. The Flyers completed the comeback when Murray Craven lit the lamp just 1:18 into overtime, giving them a 5–4 win for Philly. Howe said after, "If we play that game 250 times, we win it once."

Now facing elimination, the Capitals returned home and showed no fear as they again knocked Hextall out of the game after posting a 4–1 lead, but this time it only took 29 minutes. Washington went on to win easily this time, 5–2. The final Philadelphia goal came on a power play in the second period after the team asked to check goalie Pete Peeters' stick, which was ruled to be wider than permitted by the rules. Peeters admitted all his sticks were the same and so he had to use one of backup Clint Malarchuk's sticks for the rest of the game.

The Flyers now had a chance to clinch the series at home in Game 6, which would be another penalty-filled contest. It was highlighted (or lowlighted, depending on your point of view) by Philadelphia defenseman Greg Smyth spending 27 minutes in the sin bin. Given all the infractions, it was no surprise that the difference in the game was special teams. While Philadelphia went a pedestrian 1-for-8 on the power play, Washington was a scintillating 4-of-9. The key play in the game was Flyers forward Dave Brown trying to fight Caps counterpart Bob Gould. However, assistant captain Gould shrewdly went turtle, covering up, and letting Brown whale on him a couple times before officials stepped in. Gould went back to the bench as Brown's fighting major gave the Capitals, who were already ahead 2–0, a 5:00 power play, during which they scored twice to blow the game open. Washington romped to a 7–2 triumph with 7 different goal scorers to set up the 7th and deciding game back in D.C.

In a series full of twists and turns (some of them being highly illegal and downright nasty), the final turn of them all came in one of the more exciting Game 7's in Stanley Cup playoff history. But first, one last bit of nasty had to be doled out. During a Flyer power play late in a scoreless first period, Capitals defenseman Grant Ledyard didn't like the way Flyers forward Rick Tocchet checked him to the ice in front of the Washington goal. Ledyard promptly speared Tocchet in the groin with the blade of his stick and received a 5-minute major and a game misconduct. Tim Kerr scored during the Ledyard penalty, giving the Flyers a 1–0 lead after the 1st period.

Things went from bad to worse for the Caps as the 1-goal deficit was tripled less than 3:00 into the 2nd period on markers by Brian Propp and Mark Howe. Just like Game 4, one team had a 3-goal lead and all the momentum. But momentum's a funny thing. It changed four minutes later when Dale Hunter, who was picked up in the offseason from the Quebec Nordiques, fired a backwards cross-ice pass to a wide open Garry Galley who beat Ron Hextall with a slapshot. With the Capital Centre crowd now in full throat, Washington kept up the pressure and forced an icing and an offensive zone faceoff. Mike Ridley dueled with Peter Zezel and the puck was kicked and dribbled right in front of the crease where Kelly Miller stuffed it under Hextall's pads. Two goals in about 90 seconds and it was a brand new hockey game.

But just when the actual play on the ice looked to be returning to center stage, tempers flared again. As the Caps rushed up ice for the tying goal, forward Dave Christian fired a high shot that Hextall jumped to try to corral on his chest, Washington defenseman Kevin Hatcher, charging the net for a rebound, lowered the boom and ran right over the Flyer netminder, earning him a minor penalty and putting the three officials quickly to work to break up the players before any punches could be thrown. Hatcher would atone for his mistake before the period was out.

Philadelphia tried to clear from their defensive half-wall, but failed to flip the puck over the 6'3" defenseman. Hatcher gloved it down at the blue line and walked in to fire a wicked slapshot that beat Hextall shortside to tie the game. Just as Philadelphia needed less than twenty minutes to erase a 3-goal deficit in Game 4, Washington had done the same in Game 7. However, there was still a whole 3rd period to go.

Just over 5:00 into the 3rd, Kjell Samuelsson was sent off the ice for tripping Peter Sundström. Washington was so potent in the previous game with the man advantage, but had failed to score in this contest despite over 9 1/2 minutes of power play time. They apparently didn't want to waste any more. The Caps won the offensive zone faceoff and Hatcher took the puck and passed across the blue line to Garry Galley. Galley fired low at the target, but Dale Hunter stopped the attempt about halfway to the net and re-shot the puck. Hextall, already down trying to catch the Galley shot, didn't have a chance to readjust. The light went on and the Capitals had taken a 4–3 lead with just under 15:00 to go, needing only 6 seconds of their power play to score.

But Philadelphia was not about to go quietly. Just over a minute later, the Flyers won a faceoff in their offensive zone and the puck came back to defenseman Brad Marsh who fired a low shot that somehow found its way through the legs and sticks of a half-dozen players before zooming past Peeters and into the net for the tying goal. Again, initiation was the sincerest form of flattery in this series, although it had been defined by flattening throughout. Both defenses tightened up and very few scoring chances came for the rest of regulation and the game went to overtime tied 4–4.

Having already lost one dramatic overtime game in the series and still stinging from the heartbreak of the previous season's quadruple-overtime playoff loss at home in Game 7 in the famed Easter Epic (rated the #7 game in New York Islanders history), Capitals fans were not relishing bonus hockey. Adding to the uncertainty was whether all the bad blood that had been spilled in this series might dramatically affect the outcome. No one knew how this one was going to end.

It almost ended in less than 5 seconds. Philadelphia won the opening faceoff and Mark Howe skated across the red line and fired a long, high slapshot. Pete Peeters reached up to catch it, but the puck deflected off his glove and came down just high and wide of the goal. Neither team had a real decent scoring opportunity, though, until a Washington defensive clear wound up springing Mike Gartner on a breakaway. As the Caps leading goal scorer tried to catch up to the pass, he was hooked down from behind by Mark Howe, giving the Capitals a rare overtime power play.

Washington had Hextall out of position three times early in the man advantage but couldn't get a clean shot away. Then, as things looked to be cooling off, Scott Stevens was taken down, but still managed to get the puck over to Mike Ridley on the left side. He slid it back to Gartner who was all alone 10 feet in front of the net. Gartner's shot beat Hextall clean glove-side-high, but didn't beat the crossbar, marking the third time in the game the iron had repelled a Washington scoring chance. Adding insult to, well, insult, the rebound then dropped almost straight down into the crease where it bounced over Dale Hunter's sweeping stick, which had nothing between it and the open net. The ensuing chaotic scramble would send Philly's Brian Propp on a shorthanded breakaway down the right wing. His first shot found the right pad of Peeters, and his rebound attempt was scooped by Peeters' glove.

Less than a minute later, Gartner was sprung again by Ridley down his favored right wing. Gartner beat one defenseman, drew the second one to him, and then sent a perfect pass across to Peter Sundstrom. The redirect was on target, but Hextall somehow got back to make arguably his best save of the series, robbing Sundstrom from point-blank range. Washington kept the pressure on and about a minute later almost won it again, this time it was Hunter from behind the net setting up Bobby Gould, whose backhand one-timer from just above the crease was kicked out by Hextall's stick.

Gould got another shot after Washington retrieved Philadelphia's clear and Murray Craven skated the loose puck out of the Flyer zone. He got as far as the Caps blue line where he was poke-checked by Larry Murphy. Craven tried to return the favor as he went off the ice for a line change, but the puck bounced off Scott Stevens' skate and came right back to Murphy. That's when Murphy looked up and saw Hunter making a hard u-turn just past the red line with his stick raised. Hunter perfectly split three Flyers and Murphy hit him in stride right at the blue line. Hunter cruised in and later said he didn't know what he was going to do until the last moment when he saw an opening between Hextall's pads. The man who six years earlier won a deciding Game 5 (best-of-5 series) for Quebec with an overtime goal against Montreal, feathered a slithering shot that hit the back of the net 5:57 into overtime, giving the Capitals a thrilling 5–4 victory and a 4–3 series triumph. In the process, the Capitals became the first team in NHL history to comeback from a 3-1 deficit the year after blowing a 3-1 lead.

The game would not only be one of the most disheartening and gut-wrenching for Flyer fans, it would also be the last for Philadelphia's head coach Mike Keenan, who left in the offseason to take the head job with the Chicago Blackhawks.

As for Washington, the victory was recently voted the #1 game in the history of the franchise.

April 6	Philadelphia Flyers	4–2	Washington Capitals	Capital Centre	Recap
Peter Zezel (1) – 05:17		First period	No scoring
Peter Zezel (2) – 05:11		Second period	12:05 – pp – Michal Pivonka (1)
Dave Poulin (1) – pp – 09:21; Murray Craven (1) – 19:42		Third period	05:27 – pp – Dale Hunter (1)
Ron Hextall 35 saves / 37 shots		Goalie stats	Pete Peeters 27 saves / 30 shots

April 7	Philadelphia Flyers	4–5	Washington Capitals	Capital Centre	Recap
Mark Howe (1) – 05:32; Dave Brown (1) – 07:59		First period	00:47 – Kevin Hatcher (1); 18:36 – Bobby Gould (1)
Peter Zezel (3) – 10:49		Second period	11:10 – Stephen Leach (1); 18:06 – sh – Peter Sundstrom (1)
Brian Propp (1) – 15:55		Third period	06:12 – Kelly Miller (1)
Ron Hextall 23 saves / 26 shots		Goalie stats	Pete Peeters 31 saves / 35 shots

April 9	Washington Capitals	3–4	Philadelphia Flyers	Spectrum	Recap
Dale Hunter (2) – 11:49; Bengt-Ake Gustafsson (1) – pp – 16:30		First period	00:40 – Brian Propp (2)
Kevin Hatcher (2) – 14:10		Second period	03:08 – pp – Ilkka Sinisalo (1); 12:12 – Dave Poulin (2); 15:26 – Kjell Samuelsson (1)
No scoring		Third period	No scoring
Pete Peeters 25 saves / 29 shots		Goalie stats	Ron Hextall 14 saves / 17 shots

April 10	Washington Capitals	4–5	OT	Philadelphia Flyers	Spectrum	Recap
Michal Pivonka (2) – 13:06; Bengt-Ake Gustafsson (2) – 18:36		First period		09:04 – Ilkka Sinisalo (2)
No scoring		Second period		No scoring
Mike Gartner (1) – 00:55; Dale Hunter (3) – 03:04		Third period		10:53 – Mark Howe (2); 15:08 – Brian Propp (3); 19:07 – Kjell Samuelsson (2)
No scoring		First overtime period		01:18 – Murray Craven (2)
Clint Malarchuk 25 saves / 30 shots		Goalie stats		Ron Hextall 18 saves / 22 shots Mark Laforest 4 saves / 4 shots

April 12	Philadelphia Flyers	2–5	Washington Capitals	Capital Centre	Recap
Ilkka Sinisalo (3) – 14:09		First period	10:50 – Mike Ridley (1); 11:26 – Bengt-Ake Gustafsson (3)
Doug Crossman (1) – pp – 10:48		Second period	05:19 – Kevin Hatcher (3); 09:00 – sh – Bobby Gould (2); 17:10 – Michal Pivonka (3)
No scoring		Third period	No scoring
Ron Hextall 20 saves / 24 shots Mark Laforest 7 saves / 8 shots		Goalie stats	Pete Peeters 31 saves / 33 shots

April 14	Washington Capitals	7–2	Philadelphia Flyers	Spectrum	Recap
Mike Ridley (2) – pp – 05:12		First period	No scoring
Dave Christian (1) – 00:25; Bengt-Ake Gustafsson (4) – pp – 02:39; Kevin Hatcher (4) – pp – 03:17; Michal Pivonka (4) – pp – 16:10		Second period	12:44 – Ilkka Sinisalo (4); 17:17 – pp – Rick Tocchet (1)
Bobby Gould (3) – sh – 02:37; Kelly Miller (2) – 10:02		Third period	No scoring
Pete Peeters 24 saves / 26 shots		Goalie stats	Ron Hextall 21 saves / 28 shots

April 16	Philadelphia Flyers	4–5	OT	Washington Capitals	Capital Centre	Recap
Tim Kerr (1) – pp – 17:36		First period		No scoring
Brian Propp (4) – 01:35; Mark Howe (3) – 02:59		Second period		06:42 – Garry Galley (1); 08:02 – Kelly Miller (3); 17:54 – Kevin Hatcher (5)
Brad Marsh (1) – 06:21		Third period		05:19 – pp – Dale Hunter (4)
No scoring		First overtime period		05:57 – Dale Hunter (5)
Ron Hextall 35 saves / 40 shots		Goalie stats		Pete Peeters 29 saves / 33 shots

Washington won series 4–3

=== Second round ===
The historic win did not propel the Capitals very far. Facing the New Jersey Devils in the Patrick Division Finals, Washington again cannot keep their home ice advantage. After winning Game 1 3–1 behind 33 saves from Pete Peeters, the Capitals dropped Game 2 at home 5–2 as Aaron Broten had a hat trick for the Devils.

Jersey doubled their Game 2 score in Game 3, winning by a stunning 10–4 margin behind a pair of hat tricks. Mark Johnson scored 4 times and Peter Sundstrom's twin brother, Patrik, torched his sibling's squad with 3 goals and 5 assists, the 8 points setting a new Stanley Cup playoff record. Peeters was yanked after giving up 3 goals on just 10 shots in the first period, but replacement Clint Malarchuk did even worse, stopping only 14 of the 21 shots he faced.

Washington rebounded with a 4–1 win in Game 4 behind a pair of Dave Christian goals and coach Bryan Murray actually splitting time between his goalies. However, New Jersey stole Game 5 right back in D.C. by a 3–1 count as Bob Sauve started in place of Sean Burke in net and stopped 28 shots.

Down 3-2 and facing elimination on the road, Washington forced Game 7 with a 7–2 victory from the previous series in which 7 different Capitals scored, including power play goals from Gartner and Hunter.

This time, however, there was no magical comeback as John MacLean's tally proved to be the game winner in a 3–2 triumph that sent the Devils on to their first conference final. In a most unusual twist, the road team won 5 of the 7 games in the series.

April 18	New Jersey Devils	1–3	Washington Capitals	Capital Centre	Recap
No scoring		First period	07:18 – Mike Ridley (3)
No scoring		Second period	03:29 – pp – Larry Murphy (1); 16:48 – Scott Stevens (1)
Tom Kurvers (1) – 09:49		Third period	No scoring
Sean Burke 28 saves / 31 shots		Goalie stats	Pete Peeters 33 saves / 34 shots

April 20	New Jersey Devils	5–2	Washington Capitals	Capital Centre	Recap
Aaron Broten (2) – pp – 09:37		First period	13:15 – Mike Ridley (4)
Aaron Broten (3) – 03:02; Aaron Broten (4) – pp – 05:23; Pat Verbeek (2) – 18:14		Second period	17:45 – pp – Larry Robinson (2)
Patrik Sundstrom (3) – pp – 12:49		Third period	No scoring
Sean Burke 28 saves / 30 shots		Goalie stats	Pete Peeters 25 saves / 30 shots

April 22	Washington Capitals	4–10	New Jersey Devils	Brendan Byrne Arena	Recap
Dave Christian (2) – pp – 18:22		First period	10:37 – pp – Mark Johnson (5); 15:07 – pp – Mark Johnson (6)
Larry Murphy (3) – 06:51; Mike Gartner (2) – 09:50; Larry Murphy (4) – 13:57		Second period	00:57 – Patrik Sundstrom (4); 02:01 – sh – Claude Loiselle (2); 11:39 – Anders Carlsson (1); 15:33 – Doug Brown (3); 19:45 – Patrik Sundstrom (5)
No scoring		Third period	02:59 – Mark Johnson (7); 09:47 – pp – Mark Johnson (8); 14:14 – Patrik Sundstrom (6)
Clint Malarchuk 14 saves / 21 shots Pete Peeters 7 saves / 10 shots		Goalie stats	Sean Burke 28 saves / 32 shots

April 24	Washington Capitals	4–1	New Jersey Devils	Brendan Byrne Arena	Recap
Dave Christian (3) – 03:55; Peter Sundstrom (2) – 11:02		First period	03:12 – pp – Tom Kurvers (2)
Dave Christian (4) – 09:11		Second period	No scoring
Dale Hunter (6) – pp – 08:45		Third period	No scoring
Pete Peeters 11 saves / 12 shots Clint Malarchuk 13 saves / 13 shots		Goalie stats	Sean Burke 27 saves / 31 shots

April 26	New Jersey Devils	3–1	Washington Capitals	Capital Centre	Recap
Kirk Muller (1) – 16:36		First period	No scoring
Tom Kurvers (3) – pp – 06:54		Second period	No scoring
Kirk Muller (2) – 13:26		Third period	10:24 – Mike Ridley (5)
Bob Sauve 28 saves / 29 shots		Goalie stats	Clint Malarchuk 28 saves / 31 shots

April 28	Washington Capitals	7–2	New Jersey Devils	Brendan Byrne Arena	Recap
Mike Ridley (6) – 06:40; Dale Hunter (7) – pp – 13:07; Stephen Leach (2) – 17:03		First period	00:18 – Claude Loiselle (3)
Yvon Corriveau (1) – 10:43; Dave Christian (5) – 17:48		Second period	No scoring
Kelly Miller (4) – sh – 05:25; Mike Gartner (3) – pp – 18:32		Third period	07:21 – David Maley (2)
Pete Peeters 25 saves / 27 shots		Goalie stats	Sean Burke 13 saves / 18 shots Bob Sauve 11 saves / 13 shots

April 30	New Jersey Devils	3–2	Washington Capitals	Capital Centre	Recap
Kirk Muller (3) – 00:14; Claude Loiselle (4) – 12:01		First period	No scoring
No scoring		Second period	15:21 – Grant Ledyard (1); 19:54 – Garry Galley (2)
John MacLean (5) – 13:49		Third period	No scoring
Sean Burke 30 saves / 32 shots		Goalie stats	Pete Peeters 23 saves / 26 shots

New Jersey won series 4–3

As a final note, the playoffs ended in bizarre fashion. After a Game 3 loss to Boston in the Wales Conference Finals, New Jersey coach Jim Schoenfeld and referee Don Koharski got into a heated argument during which Koharski tripped and fell, accusing Schoenfeld of pushing him. Schoenfield famously responded, "You tripped and fell, you fat pig!" Then, he added "Have another doughnut! Have another doughnut!" Boston won the series in seven games and advance to face Edmonton in the finals. Schoenfeld was fired two years later and go on to coach the Capitals for four seasons in the mid-1990s.

Facing being swept at home in Game 4 of the finals, the Bruins apparently tried to use some of the Celtic magic their Boston Garden counterparts had made famous over the years. The sweltering heat outside resulted in the ice surface being shrouded in fog and slowed the vaunted Oiler attack. Then, the building suffered a power overload, plunging the Garden into darkness. The blackout was presumably caused by the air conditioning system short-circuiting from running on full power for too long. League rules stated that the game (which was tied at 3 in the 2nd period) had to be canceled and made up in Boston at the end of the series, if necessary, making it a 2–1–1–1–1–1 format. It wasn't necessary as Edmonton completed the rare 4-game sweep in 5 games with a 6–3 victory.

== Player statistics ==
=== Regular season ===
Scoring

Player	Pos	GP	G	A	Pts	PIM	+/-	PPG	SHG	GWG
Mike Gartner	RW	80	48	33	81	73	20	19	0	7
Scott Stevens	D	80	12	60	72	184	14	5	1	2
Larry Murphy	D	79	8	53	61	72	2	7	0	1
Mike Ridley	C	70	28	31	59	22	1	12	0	3
Dale Hunter	C	79	22	37	59	240	7	11	0	1
Dave Christian	RW	80	37	21	58	26	-14	14	0	5
Bengt-Ake Gustafsson	RW	78	18	36	54	29	2	7	5	3
Kevin Hatcher	D	71	14	27	41	137	1	5	0	3
Michal Pivonka	C	71	11	23	34	28	1	3	0	0
Kelly Miller	LW	80	9	23	32	35	9	0	1	3
Garry Galley	D	58	7	23	30	44	11	3	0	0
Greg Adams	LW	78	15	12	27	153	-3	3	0	0
Bobby Gould	RW	72	12	14	26	56	-1	0	0	2
Peter Sundstrom	LW	76	8	17	25	34	-2	0	1	1
Yvon Corriveau	LW	44	10	9	19	84	17	0	0	1
Rod Langway	D	63	3	13	16	28	1	0	0	1
Lou Franceschetti	RW	59	4	8	12	113	2	1	0	1
Craig Laughlin	RW	40	5	5	10	26	-8	3	0	1
Grant Ledyard	D	21	4	3	7	14	-4	1	0	1
Greg Smith	D	54	1	6	7	67	5	0	0	0
Paul Cavallini	D	24	2	3	5	66	0	0	0	1
Bill Houlder	D	30	1	2	3	10	-2	0	0	0
Stephen Leach	RW	8	1	1	2	17	2	0	0	1
Clint Malarchuk	G	54	0	2	2	10	0	0	0	0
Ed Kastelic	W	35	1	0	1	78	-3	0	0	0
David Jensen	C	5	0	1	1	4	0	0	0	0
Pete Peeters	G	35	0	1	1	10	0	0	0	0
Yves Beaudoin	D	1	0	0	0	0	-1	0	0	0
Alain Raymond	G	1	0	0	0	0	0	0	0	0
Mike Richard	C	4	0	0	0	0	-1	0	0	0

Goaltending

Player	MIN	GP	W	L	T	GA	GAA	SO	SA	SV	SV%
Clint Malarchuk	2926	54	24	20	4	154	3.16	4	1340	1186	.885
Pete Peeters	1896	35	14	12	5	88	2.78	2	866	778	.898
Alain Raymond	40	1	0	1	0	2	3.00	0	20	18	.900
Team:	4862	80	38	33	9	244	3.01	6	2226	1982	.890

=== Playoffs ===
Scoring

Player	Pos	GP	G	A	Pts	PIM	PPG	SHG	GWG
Bengt-Ake Gustafsson	RW	14	4	9	13	6	2	0	1
Michal Pivonka	C	14	4	9	13	4	2	0	0
Dale Hunter	C	14	7	5	12	98	4	0	1
Kevin Hatcher	D	14	5	7	12	55	1	0	1
Scott Stevens	D	13	1	11	12	46	0	0	0
Mike Ridley	C	14	6	5	11	10	1	0	0
Dave Christian	RW	14	5	6	11	6	1	0	0
Kelly Miller	LW	14	4	4	8	10	0	1	1
Larry Murphy	D	13	4	4	8	33	2	0	1
Mike Gartner	RW	14	3	4	7	14	1	0	0
Garry Galley	D	13	2	4	6	13	0	0	0
Greg Adams	LW	14	0	5	5	58	0	0	0
Bobby Gould	RW	14	3	1	4	21	0	2	0
Stephen Leach	RW	9	2	1	3	0	0	0	1
Yvon Corriveau	LW	13	1	2	3	30	0	0	0
Peter Sundstrom	LW	14	2	0	2	6	0	1	1
Grant Ledyard	D	14	1	0	1	30	0	0	0
Chris Felix	D	1	0	0	0	0	0	0	0
Lou Franceschetti	RW	4	0	0	0	14	0	0	0
Jeff Greenlaw	LW	1	0	0	0	19	0	0	0
Grant Jennings	D	1	0	0	0	0	0	0	0
Ed Kastelic	W	1	0	0	0	19	0	0	0
Rod Langway	D	6	0	0	0	8	0	0	0
Clint Malarchuk	G	4	0	0	0	2	0	0	0
Pete Peeters	G	12	0	0	0	4	0	0	0
Greg Smith	D	9	0	0	0	23	0	0	0

Goaltending

Player	MIN	GP	W	L	GA	GAA	SO	SA	SV	SV%
Pete Peeters	654	12	7	5	34	3.12	0	326	292	.896
Clint Malarchuk	193	4	0	2	15	4.66	0	95	80	.842
Team:	847	14	7	7	49	3.47	0	421	372	.884

Note: GP = Games played; G = Goals; A = Assists; Pts = Points; +/- = Plus/minus; PIM = Penalty minutes; PPG=Power-play goals; SHG=Short-handed goals; GWG=Game-winning goals
MIN=Minutes played; W = Wins; L = Losses; T = Ties; GA = Goals against; GAA = Goals against average; SO = Shutouts; SA=Shots against; SV=Shots saved; SV% = Save percentage;

== Draft picks ==
Washington's draft picks at the 1987 NHL entry draft held at the Joe Louis Arena in Detroit, Michigan.

Round	#	Player	Nationality	College/Junior/Club team (League)
2	36	Jeff Ballantyne	Canada	Ottawa 67's (OHL)
3	57	Steve Maltais	Canada	Cornwall Royals (OHL)
4	78	Tyler Larter	Canada	Sault Ste. Marie Greyhounds (OHL)
5	99	Pat Beauchesne	Canada	Moose Jaw Warriors (WHL)
6	120	Rich DeFreitas	United States	St. Mark's School (USHS-MA)
7	141	Devon Oleniuk	Canada	Kamloops Blazers (WHL)
8	162	Thomas Sjogren	Sweden	Västra Frölunda HC (Sweden)
10	204	Chris Clarke	Canada	Pembroke Lumber Kings (COJHL)
11	225	Milos Vanik	East Germany	EHC Freiburg (West Germany)
12	240	Dan Brettschneider	United States	Burnsville High School (USHS-MN)
12	246	Ryan Kummu	Canada	Rensselaer Polytechnic Institute (ECAC)
S2	16	Mark Anderson	United States	Ohio State University (CCHA)

== See also ==
- 1987–88 NHL season
