= 1987–88 New Jersey Devils season =

National Hockey League season

1987–88 New Jersey Devils
- Division: 4th Patrick
- Conference: 7th Wales
- 1987–88 record: 38–36–6
- Home record: 23–16–1
- Road record: 15–20–5
- Goals for: 295
- Goals against: 296

Team information
- General manager: Max McNab (Jun. 13 – Sep. 10); Lou Lamoriello (Sep. 10 – May 14)
- Coach: Doug Carpenter (Oct. 9 – Jan. 26); Jim Schoenfeld (Jan. 26 – May 14)
- Captain: Kirk Muller
- Alternate captains: Aaron Broten; Joe Cirella
- Arena: Brendan Byrne Arena

Team leaders
- Goals: Pat Verbeek (46)
- Assists: Aaron Broten; Kirk Muller (57)
- Points: Kirk Muller (94)
- Penalty minutes: Ken Daneyko (239)
- Plus/minus: Pat Verbeek (+29)
- Wins: Alain Chevrier (18)
- Goals against average: Sean Burke (3.05)

The 1987–88 New Jersey Devils season was the 14th season for the National Hockey League (NHL) franchise that was established on June 11, 1974, and sixth season since the franchise relocated from Colorado prior to the 1982–83 NHL season. The Devils finished fourth in the Patrick Division with a record of 38 wins, 36 losses, and 6 ties for 82 points, garnering the first winning record in the franchise's 14-year history.

On the final day of the regular season, the Devils were tied with their rival, the New York Rangers, for the final playoff spot in the Patrick Division. After New York defeated the Quebec Nordiques 3–0, all eyes were on the Devils, who were playing the Chicago Blackhawks in Chicago. The Devils trailed 3–2 midway through the third period, but John MacLean scored to tie the game, and with two minutes left in overtime, he added the game-winning goal. Although the Rangers and Devils both finished with 82 points, the Devils had two more wins, sending them to the playoffs for the second time in franchise history, but the first time in New Jersey.

The Devils rode the momentum of this victory into a surprisingly deep playoff run, ousting the New York Islanders in six games in the division semifinals and the Washington Capitals in seven games in the division finals. They then met the Boston Bruins in the Wales Conference finals and stretched the series to seven games, but finally fell short in the seventh game.

== Season summary ==
=== Off-season ===
Hoping to light a spark under the team, team owner John McMullen hired Providence College coach and athletic director Lou Lamoriello as team president in April 1987. Lamoriello appointed himself general manager shortly before the 1987–88 season. This move came as a considerable surprise to NHL circles; although Lamoriello had been a college coach for 19 years, he had never played, coached, or managed in the NHL and was almost unknown outside the American college hockey community.

=== Regular season ===
On November 25, 1987, Aaron Broten scored just 13 seconds into overtime to give the Devils an 8–7 road win over the Edmonton Oilers. It would prove to be the fastest overtime goal scored during the 1987–88 regular season.

On April 3, 1988, the last day of the regular season, the Devils were scheduled to play the Chicago Blackhawks in Chicago, the New York Rangers were scheduled to host Quebec Nordiques at home, and the Pittsburgh Penguins were scheduled to host Hartford Whalers at home. Going into the game, the Devils were tied with the Rangers with 80 points and one point ahead of the Penguins (79) for the last playoff spot in the Patrick Division. The Penguins beat the Whalers, 4–2, to finish their season with 81 points, and the Rangers shut out the Nordiques, 3–0, to finish their season with 82 points, eliminating the Penguins. When both games ended, the Devils–Blackhawks game was still in progress. Both teams skated to a 3–3 tie after 60 minutes. For the Devils to qualify for the playoffs, they would have to score in overtime to get the win and the two points to win the tiebreaker over the Rangers. An overtime loss would keep them at 80 points, and a 3–3 tie would move them up only to 81 points, handing the last playoff berth to the Rangers. At 2:21 of the overtime period, John MacLean scored the game-winning goal on a rebound slap-shot past Blackhawks netminder Darren Pang to give the Devils a 4–3 win. Both the Devils and Rangers finished with 82 points. However, since the Devils had two more wins during the regular season, they ended up taking the Patrick Division's fourth playoff spot and thereby sealed the first-ever playoff berth for the franchise in New Jersey.

Gary Thorne called MacLean's overtime, playoff-berth-clinching goal on SportsChannel New York:

MacLean...off the boards, Sundstrom, he's alone, Sundstrom...Murray on him, shot...that was deflected, went off the skate of Bob Murray the defenseman. Flipped up by Chicago, not out...kept in by MacLean, good job, MacLean centered Sundstrom. Sundstrom back to the point...Joe Cirella...Cirella got in, Cirella takes a shot, save by Pang, rebound...SCORES!!! THEY DID IT!!! THEY DID IT!!! THE DEVILS MAKE THE PLAYOFFS FOR THE FIRST TIME IN THEIR HISTORY! JOHN MACLEAN THE OVERTIME GOAL! AND THEY WIN IT 4-3!

=== Playoffs ===
The team made it all the way to the conference finals, but lost to the Boston Bruins in seven games.

The conference finals featured a major argument between coach Jim Schoenfeld and referee Don Koharski following Game 3 at the Meadowlands on May 6, 1988. Schoenfeld accosted Koharski in the tunnel on the way back to the dressing rooms regarding his officiating in the 6–1 New Jersey defeat. While Schoenfeld was yelling at him, Koharski stumbled and fell against the wall. Although Schoenfeld did not appear to have made any contact with him, Koharski believed that the Devils' head coach had pushed him and yelled, "you're gone now, you're gone," implying that Schoenfeld would be suspended for physically attacking him. Schoenfeld denied pushing Koharski repeatedly, saying that the referee had simply lost his balance. While this was going on, WABC-TV cameras recorded the entire incident and as the two men were separated, Koharski said that he had hoped that his fall was on tape. "Good," Schoenfeld responded, "because you fell, you fat pig! Have another doughnut! Have another doughnut!"

Two days later, on May 8, the NHL suspended Schoenfeld. However, since a proper hearing had not been scheduled, Devils general manager Lou Lamoriello set out to procure a restraining order against the league to allow Schoenfeld to coach the game. Working with Bergen County Judge John Conte, Lamoriello was able to get New Jersey Superior Court Judge James Madden to hear the case on an emergency basis. Madden granted the Devils' request and issued the restraining order, which took effect at that evening, nearly 30 minutes before the opening faceoff for Game 4. However, the scheduled officiating crew refused to work the game afterwards and the start was delayed, while replacement officials were located. After over an hour, the game got underway and the Devils recorded a 3–1 win. Afterward, a proper hearing regarding Schoenfeld's actions would take place and he would again be suspended, with Lamoriello taking his place for Game 5 in Boston.

=== Sean Burke ===
Sean Burke was drafted by the Devils in the second round of the 1985 NHL entry draft. He earned national attention from his international play. He backstopped Canada's junior national team to a silver medal in the 1986 World Junior Championships and a fourth-place finish for the men's national team at the 1988 Winter Olympics.

Burke went from the Winter Olympics to the Devils. He started 11 games for the Devils in the 1987–88 season, including an overtime victory against the Chicago Blackhawks on the final night of the regular season that qualified the Devils for their first playoff series.

Dubbed a "rookie sensation", Burke helped the Devils go on a playoff roll, defeating the division leader New York Islanders in the first round in six games and then the Washington Capitals in seven games. Burke was one game away from the Stanley Cup Finals, but lost in game 7 of the Wales Conference finals to the Boston Bruins.

== Standings ==
Patrick Division
	GP	W	L	T	GF	GA	Pts
**New York Islanders**	80	39	31	10	308	267	88
**Washington Capitals**	80	38	33	9	281	249	85
**Philadelphia Flyers**	80	38	33	9	292	292	85
**New Jersey Devils**	80	38	36	6	295	296	82
New York Rangers	80	36	34	10	300	283	82
Pittsburgh Penguins	80	36	35	9	319	316	81

Note: GP = Games played, W = Wins, L = Losses, T = Ties, Pts = Points, GF = Goals for, GA = Goals against
Note: Teams that qualified for the playoffs are highlighted in bold.

=== Record vs. opponents ===
Patrick Division record vs. opponents

==== Vs. Wales Conference ====
**Vs. Patrick Division**

1987–88 NHL records
Team	**NJD**	**NYI**	**NYR**	**PHI**	**PIT**	**WSH**	**Total**
New Jersey	—	3–4	3–4	5–0–2	6–1	2–5	19–14–2
N.Y. Islanders	4–3	—	2–2–3	3–3–1	2–4–1	4–2–1	15–14–6
N.Y. Rangers	4–3	2–2–3	—	3–3–1	2–3–2	2–5	13–16–6
Philadelphia	0–5–2	3–3–1	3–3–1	—	5–2	2–4–1	13–17–5
Pittsburgh	1–6	4–2–1	3–2–2	2–5	—	5–1–1	15–16–4
Washington	5–2	2–4–1	5–2	4–2–1	1–5–1	—	17–15–3

**Vs. Adams Division**

1987–88 NHL records
Team	**BOS**	**BUF**	**HFD**	**MTL**	**QUE**	**Total**
New Jersey	1–2	0–2–1	1–1–1	2–1	0–3	4–9–2
N.Y. Islanders	2–1	2–1	2–1	0–3	2–1	8–7–0
N.Y. Rangers	2–1	0–3	2–1	1–1–1	2–1	7–7–1
Philadelphia	2–1	3–0	2–1	0–1–2	2–0–1	9–3–3
Pittsburgh	0–2–1	2–0–1	2–1	2–1	3–0	9–4–2
Washington	2–1	0–2–1	2–1	1–1–1	2–1	7–6–2

==== Vs. Campbell Conference ====
**Vs. Norris Division**

1987–88 NHL records
Team	**CHI**	**DET**	**MIN**	**STL**	**TOR**	**Total**
New Jersey	3–0	0–3	3–0	3–0	2–1	11–4–0
N.Y. Islanders	0–1–2	1–2	1–1–1	2–0–1	0–3	4–7–4
N.Y. Rangers	2–0–1	1–1–1	2–1	3–0	2–1	10–3–2
Philadelphia	0–3	2–0–1	2–1	2–1	1–2	7–7–1
Pittsburgh	2–1	1–2	2–1	0–3	2–1	7–8–0
Washington	2–1	0–2–1	2–0–1	0–2–1	1–1–1	5–6–4

**Vs. Smythe Division**

1987–88 NHL records
Team	**CGY**	**EDM**	**LAK**	**VAN**	**WIN**	**Total**
New Jersey	1–2	2–1	1–1–1	0–3	0–2–1	4–9–2
N.Y. Islanders	2–1	2–1	3–0	3–0	2–1	12–3–0
N.Y. Rangers	1–2	1–2	0–3	2–1	2–0–1	6–8–1
Philadelphia	0–3	1–2	3–0	2–1	3–0	9–6–0
Pittsburgh	2–0–1	0–3	1–0–2	1–2	1–2	5–7–3
Washington	1–2	2–1	2–1	3–0	1–2	9–6–0

== Schedule and results ==
=== Regular season ===
1987–88 regular season
October: 7–3–0 (home: 6–0–0; road: 1–3–0)

Game	Date	Visitor	Score	Home	OT	Decision	Record	Points	Record
1	October 9	Pittsburgh	6–3	New Jersey		Chevrier	1–0–0	2	
2	October 10	New Jersey	2–5	Toronto		Chevrier	1–1–0	2	
3	October 14	Hartford	1–3	New Jersey		Chevrier	2–1–0	4	
4	October 16	Montreal	3–4	New Jersey		Chevrier	3–1–0	6	
5	October 17	New Jersey	3–4	Hartford	OT	Chevrier	3–2–0	6	
6	October 21	New Jersey	5–4	Pittsburgh		Chevrier	4–2–0	8	
7	October 23	NY Islanders	3–5	New Jersey		Chevrier	5–2–0	10	
8	October 24	New Jersey	1–2	NY Islanders		Chevrier	5–3–0	10	
9	October 27	Philadelphia	0–4	New Jersey		Chevrier	6–3–0	12	
10	October 31	Edmonton	5–6	New Jersey		Chevrier	7–3–0	14	

November: 6–5–3 (home: 4–1–1; road: 2–4–2)

Game	Date	Visitor	Score	Home	OT	Decision	Record	Points	Record
11	November 3	New Jersey	3–6	NY Islanders		Chevrier	7–4–0	14	
12	November 5	St. Louis	3–5	New Jersey		Sauve	8–4–0	16	
13	November 7	Washington	1–4	New Jersey		Sauve	9–4–0	18	
14	November 8	New Jersey	3–3	Philadelphia	OT	Chevrier	9–4–1	19	
15	November 10	New Jersey	3–2	NY Rangers		Chevrier	10–4–1	21	
16	November 12	Winnipeg	1–1	New Jersey	OT	Sauve	10–4–2	22	
17	November 14	Detroit	6–4	New Jersey		Sauve	10–5–2	22	
18	November 18	Philadelphia	3–4	New Jersey		Chevrier	11–5–2	24	
19	November 20	Chicago	2–5	New Jersey		Chevrier	12–5–2	26	
20	November 21	New Jersey	1–2	Montreal		Sauve	12–6–2	26	
21	November 23	New Jersey	2–9	Calgary		Chevrier	12–7–2	26	
22	November 25	New Jersey	8–7	Edmonton	OT	Chevrier	13–7–2	28	
23	November 27	New Jersey	4–2	Vancouver		Chevrier	13–8–2	28	
24	November 29	New Jersey	2–2	Los Angeles	OT	Chevrier	13–8–3	29	

December: 5–8–1 (home: 3–4–0; road: 2–4–1)

Game	Date	Visitor	Score	Home	OT	Decision	Record	Points	Record
25	December 3	St. Louis	2–4	New Jersey		Chevrier	14–8–3	31	
26	December 5	New Jersey	2–3	Quebec		Sauve	14–9–3	31	
27	December 6	New Jersey	1–1	Philadelphia	OT	Chevrier	14–9–4	32	
28	December 9	Los Angeles	1–2	New Jersey		Chevrier	15–9–4	34	
29	December 11	Calgary	5–1	New Jersey		Chevrier	15–10–4	34	
30	December 12	New Jersey	3–5	NY Islanders		Sauve	15–11–4	34	
31	December 16	New Jersey	3–9	NY Rangers		Sauve	15–12–4	34	
32	December 17	Pittsburgh	7–4	New Jersey		Chevrier	15–13–4	34	
33	December 19	New Jersey	3–1	Minnesota		Chevrier	16–13–4	36	
34	December 20	New Jersey	1–4	Winnipeg		Chevrier	16–14–4	36	
35	December 23	New Jersey	6–2	Pittsburgh		Chevrier	17–14–4	38	
36	December 26	NY Rangers	5–3	New Jersey		Chevrier	17–15–4	38	
37	December 28	NY Islanders	4–6	New Jersey		Sauve	18–15–4	40	
38	December 30	Washington	4–3	New Jersey		Sauve	18–16–4	40	

January: 5–8–1 (home: 3–5–0; road: 2–3–1)

Game	Date	Visitor	Score	Home	OT	Decision	Record	Points	Record
39	January 2	New Jersey	1–1	Hartford	OT	Sauve	18–16–5	41	
40	January 4	Los Angeles	6–3	New Jersey		Sauve	18–17–5	41	
41	January 7	Vancouver	6–3	New Jersey		Chevrier	18–18–5	41	
42	January 9	New Jersey	4–3	Minnesota		Sauve	19–18–5	43	
43	January 10	New Jersey	7–5	Philadelphia		Chevrier	20–18–5	45	
44	January 13	Quebec	5–3	New Jersey		Chevrier	20–19–5	45	
45	January 15	Toronto	3–7	New Jersey		Sauve	21–19–5	47	
46	January 16	New Jersey	2–4	NY Islanders		Chevrier	21–20–5	47	
47	January 19	New Jersey	4–6	Washington		Sauve	21–21–5	47	
48	January 21	Detroit	3–2	New Jersey	OT	Sauve	21–22–5	47	
49	January 22	New Jersey	3–7	Buffalo		Chevrier	21–23–5	47	
50	January 25	Buffalo	5–2	New Jersey		Chevrier	21–24–5	47	
51	January 28	Pittsburgh	3–6	New Jersey		Sauve	22–24–5	49	
52	January 29	Chicago	2–3	New Jersey	OT	Sauve	23–24–5	51	

February: 5–8–0 (home: 3–4–0; road: 2–4–0)

Game	Date	Visitor	Score	Home	OT	Decision	Record	Points	Record
53	February 1	New Jersey	5–4	Calgary		Chevrier	24–24–5	53	
54	February 3	New Jersey	5–8	Edmonton		Chevrier	24–25–5	53	
55	February 5	New Jersey	1–5	Vancouver		Sauve	24–26–5	53	
56	February 7	New Jersey	3–6	Boston		Chevrier	24–27–5	53	
57	February 11	Montreal	2–4	New Jersey		Sauve	25–27–5	55	
58	February 12	New Jersey	3–4	Detroit		Sauve	25–28–5	55	
59	February 14	New Jersey	7–2	Toronto		Sauve	26–28–5	57	
60	February 17	Washington	3–4	New Jersey		Sauve	26–29–5	57	
61	February 19	NY Rangers	3–6	New Jersey		Sauve	27–29–5	59	
62	February 21	Boston	4–1	New Jersey		Sauve	27–30–5	59	
63	February 24	Winnipeg	3–1	New Jersey		Sauve	27–31–5	59	
64	February 26	NY Rangers	2–1	New Jersey		Sauve	27–32–5	59	
65	February 28	Minnesota	6–8	New Jersey		Chevrier	28–32–5	61	

March: 8–4–1 (home: 3–2–0; road: 5–2–1)

Game	Date	Visitor	Score	Home	OT	Decision	Record	Points	Record
66	March 1	New Jersey	3–5	Washington		Sauve	28–33–5	61	
67	March 2	Washington	6–1	New Jersey		Chevrier	28–34–5	61	
68	March 5	New Jersey	7–6	Boston	OT	Burke	29–34–5	63	
69	March 6	Philadelphia	2–4	New Jersey		Burke	30–34–5	65	
70	March 8	New Jersey	4–7	NY Rangers		Chevrier	30–35–5	65	
71	March 12	New Jersey	6–5	Philadelphia		Burke	31–35–5	67	
72	March 17	Quebec	4–3	New Jersey		Burke	31–36–5	67	
73	March 20	New Jersey	4–2	Washington		Burke	32–36–5	69	
74	March 24	New Jersey	8–2	St. Louis		Burke	33–36–5	71	
75	March 25	New Jersey	2–2	Buffalo	OT	Sauve	33–36–6	72	
76	March 27	NY Rangers	2–7	New Jersey		Burke	34–36–6	74	
77	March 29	Pittsburgh	0–4	New Jersey		Burke	35–36–6	76	
78	March 31	New Jersey	7–2	Pittsburgh		Burke	36–36–6	78	

April: 2–0–0 (home: 1–0–0; road: 1–0–0)

Game	Date	Visitor	Score	Home	OT	Decision	Record	Points	Record
79	April 2	NY Islanders	2–5	New Jersey		Burke	37–36–6	80	
80	April 3	New Jersey	4–3	Chicago	OT	Burke	38–36–6	82	

Legend: Win (2 points) Loss (0 points) Tie (1 point)

=== Playoffs ===
1988 Stanley Cup playoffs
Division semifinals vs. (P1) NY Islanders: New Jersey won 4–2

Game	Date	Visitor	Score	Home	OT	Decision	Series	Recap
1	April 6	New Jersey	3–4	NY Islanders	OT	Burke	0–1	
2	April 7	New Jersey	3–2	NY Islanders		Sauve	1–1	
3	April 9	NY Islanders	0–3	New Jersey		Burke	2–1	
4	April 10	NY Islanders	5–4	New Jersey	OT	Burke	2–2	
5	April 12	New Jersey	4–2	NY Islanders		Burke	3–2	
6	April 14	NY Islanders	5–6	New Jersey		Burke	4–2	

Division finals vs. (P2) Washington: New Jersey won 4–3

Game	Date	Visitor	Score	Home	OT	Decision	Series	Recap
1	April 18	New Jersey	1–3	Washington		Burke	0–1	
2	April 20	New Jersey	5–2	Washington		Burke	1–1	
3	April 22	Washington	4–10	New Jersey		Burke	2–1	
4	April 24	Washington	4–1	New Jersey		Burke	2–2	
5	April 26	New Jersey	3–1	Washington		Sauve	3–2	
6	April 28	Washington	7–2	New Jersey		Burke	3–3	
7	April 30	New Jersey	3–2	Washington		Burke	4–3	

Conference finals vs. (A2) Boston: Boston won 4–3

Game	Date	Visitor	Score	Home	OT	Decision	Series	Recap
1	May 2	New Jersey	3–5	Boston		Sauve	0–1	
2	May 4	New Jersey	3–2	Boston	OT	Burke	1–1	
3	May 6	Boston	6–1	New Jersey		Burke	1–2	
4	May 8	Boston	1–3	New Jersey		Burke	2–2	
5	May 10	New Jersey	1–7	Boston		Burke	2–3	
6	May 12	Boston	3–6	New Jersey		Burke	3–3	
7	May 14	New Jersey	2–6	Boston		Burke	3–4	

Legend: Win Loss

== Player statistics ==
As of May 14, 1988

=== Skaters ===
Regular season
Player	GP	G	A	Pts	+/−	PIM
Kirk Muller	80	37	57	94	+19	114
Aaron Broten	80	26	57	83	+20	80
Pat Verbeek	73	46	31	77	+29	227
Bruce Driver	74	15	40	55	+7	68
Patrik Sundstrom	78	15	36	51	–16	42
John MacLean	76	23	16	39	–10	147
Joe Cirella	80	8	31	39	+15	191
Claude Loiselle	68	17	18	35	+7	121
Tom Kurvers	56	5	29	34	+6	46
Mark Johnson	54	14	19	33	–10	14
Craig Wolanin	78	6	25	31	0	170
Doug Sulliman	59	16	14	30	–8	22
Brendan Shanahan	65	7	19	26	–20	131
Jack O'Callahan	50	7	19	26	–3	97
Doug Brown	70	14	11	25	+7	20
Andy Brickley	45	8	14	22	+1	14
Jim Korn	52	8	13	21	–22	140
Ken Daneyko	80	5	7	12	–3	239
Randy Velischek	51	3	9	12	–13	66
Perry Anderson	60	4	6	10	–8	222
Pat Conacher	24	2	5	7	+8	12
David Maley	44	4	2	6	–13	65
George McPhee	5	3	0	3	+2	8
Gord Mark	19	0	2	2	–13	27
Chris Cichocki	5	1	0	1	+1	2
Anders Carlsson	9	1	0	1	–5	0
Murray Brumwell	3	0	1	1	0	2
Allan Stewart	1	0	0	0	+2	0
Dan Dorion	1	0	0	0	0	2

Playoffs
Player	GP	G	A	Pts	+/−	PIM
Patrik Sundstrom	18	17	13	20	+7	14
Mark Johnson	18	10	8	18	+4	4
John MacLean	20	7	11	18	+2	60
Aaron Broten	20	5	11	16	–9	20
Tom Kurvers	19	6	9	15	–5	38
Pat Verbeek	20	4	8	12	–11	51
Kirk Muller	20	4	8	12	–10	37
Claude Loiselle	20	4	6	10	0	50
Bruce Driver	20	3	7	10	–1	14
Craig Wolanin	18	2	5	7	+2	51
Ken Daneyko	20	1	6	7	+5	83
Joe Cirella	19	0	7	7	–3	49
Doug Brown	19	5	1	6	+3	6
David Maley	20	3	1	4	–2	80
Pat Conacher	17	2	2	4	+1	14
Jack O'Callahan	5	1	3	4	–2	6
Brendan Shanahan	12	2	1	3	0	44
Doug Sulliman	9	0	3	3	–2	2
Randy Velischek	19	0	2	2	–7	20
Jim Korn	9	0	2	2	+2	71
Anders Carlsson	3	1	0	1	+1	2
Andy Brickley	4	0	1	1	0	4
Troy Crowder	1	0	0	0	–2	12
Perry Anderson	10	0	0	0	–2	113

=== Goaltenders ===
Regular season
Player	GP	GS	TOI	W	L	T	GA	GAA	SA	SV%	SO	G	A	PIM
Alain Chevrier	45	38	2,350:59	18	19	3	148	3.78	1,113	.867	1	0	1	8
Sean Burke	13	12	688:00	10	1	0	35	3.05	300	.883	1	0	1	6
Bob Sauve	34	30	1,798:07	10	16	3	107	3.57	821	.870	0	0	1	4

Playoffs
Player	GP	GS	TOI	W	L	GA	GAA	SA	SV%	SO	G	A	PIM
Sean Burke	17	17	998:50	9	8	57	3.42	514	.889	1	0	0	14
Bob Sauve	5	3	236:24	2	1	13	3.30	118	.890	0	0	0	0

== Draft picks ==
Below are the New Jersey Devils' selections at the 1987 NHL entry draft and 1987 NHL supplemental draft, which were held on June 13, 1987, at Joe Louis Arena in Detroit.

Round	#	Player	Pos	Nationality	College/junior/club team
1	2	Brendan Shanahan	RW	Canada	London Knights (OHL)
2	23	Ricard Persson	D	Sweden	Östersunds IK (Division I)
4	65	Brian Sullivan	RW	United States	Springfield Olympics (NEJHL)
5	86	Kevin Dean	D	United States	Culver Military Academy (Indiana)
6	107	Ben Hankinson	RW	United States	Edina H.S. (Minnesota)
7	128	Thomas Neziol	LW	Canada	Miami (OH) (CCHA)
8	149	Jim Dowd (Note: First New Jersey native to play for the Devils; scored game-winning goal in Game 2 of the 1995 Stanley Cup Finals against the Detroit Red Wings.)	C	United States	Brick Township H.S. (New Jersey)
9	170	John Blessman	D	Canada	Toronto Marlboros (OHL)
10	191	Peter Fry	G	Canada	Victoria Cougars (WHL)
11	212	Alain Charland	C	Canada	Drummondville Voltigeurs (QMJHL)
S1	2	John Walker	LW	Canada	Northern Alberta Institute of Technology (ACAC)
S2	7	Jeff Madill	RW	Canada	Ohio State (CCHA)
