= 1987–88 Pittsburgh Penguins season =

NHL team season

1987–88 Pittsburgh Penguins
- Division: 6th Patrick
- Conference: 9th Wales
- 1987–88 record: 36–35–9
- Home record: 22–12–6
- Road record: 14–23–3
- Goals for: 319
- Goals against: 316

Team information
- General manager: Eddie Johnston
- Coach: Pierre Creamer
- Captain: Dan Frawley (Oct-Dec); Mario Lemieux (Dec-Apr)
- Alternate captains: Mario Lemieux (Oct-Dec); Dan Frawley (Dec-Apr); Dan Quinn
- Arena: Pittsburgh Civic Arena

Team leaders
- Goals: Mario Lemieux (70)
- Assists: Mario Lemieux (98)
- Points: Mario Lemieux (168)
- Penalty minutes: Rod Buskas (206)
- Wins: Steve Guenette (12)
- Goals against average: Steve Guenette (3.35)

The 1987–88 Pittsburgh Penguins season was the Penguins' 21st season in the National Hockey League (NHL). The Penguins improved on their previous season, and finished with a winning record for the first time since the 1978–79 season. Nevertheless, the Penguins again did not qualify for the playoffs for the sixth year in a row for the first time in franchise history, actually finishing last in a tightly contested Patrick Division despite earning only seven fewer points than the division champion New York Islanders.

== Regular season ==
The Penguins were involved in one of the closest playoff races in NHL history, as they competed down the stretch with the New Jersey Devils and the New York Rangers for the final playoff spot in the Patrick Division. Despite two hefty losses to New Jersey in the last two weeks of the season, the Penguins gave themselves hope with a 7–6 overtime win against the Washington Capitals in their penultimate game of the season. On the last day of the season, the Penguins defeated the Hartford Whalers 4–2 and moved ahead of New York and New Jersey. However, this position was temporary as the Rangers shut out Quebec, 3–0, eliminating the Penguins. The Devils had the last laugh as they beat the Chicago Blackhawks 4–3 in overtime on a goal by John MacLean to claim the fourth and final Patrick Division playoff spot, ahead of both the Rangers and Penguins.

The Penguins finished the regular season 1st in power-play opportunities (500), power-play opportunities against (507), power-play goals against (120) and short-handed goals allowed (19).

=== Final standings ===
Patrick Division
| | GP | W | L | T | GF | GA | Pts |
|---|---|---|---|---|---|---|---|
| **New York Islanders** | 80 | 39 | 31 | 10 | 308 | 267 | 88 |
| **Washington Capitals** | 80 | 38 | 33 | 9 | 281 | 249 | 85 |
| **Philadelphia Flyers** | 80 | 38 | 33 | 9 | 292 | 292 | 85 |
| **New Jersey Devils** | 80 | 38 | 36 | 6 | 295 | 296 | 82 |
| New York Rangers | 80 | 36 | 34 | 10 | 300 | 283 | 82 |
| Pittsburgh Penguins | 80 | 36 | 35 | 9 | 319 | 316 | 81 |

Note: GP = Games played, W = Wins, L = Losses, T = Ties, Pts = Points, GF = Goals for, GA = Goals against
Note: Teams that qualified for the playoffs are highlighted in bold.

=== Record vs. opponents ===
Patrick Division record vs. opponents

==== Vs. Wales Conference ====
**Vs. Patrick Division**

1987–88 NHL records
| Team | **NJD** | **NYI** | **NYR** | **PHI** | **PIT** | **WSH** | **Total** |
|---|---|---|---|---|---|---|---|
| New Jersey | — | 3–4 | 3–4 | 5–0–2 | 6–1 | 2–5 | 19–14–2 |
| N.Y. Islanders | 4–3 | — | 2–2–3 | 3–3–1 | 2–4–1 | 4–2–1 | 15–14–6 |
| N.Y. Rangers | 4–3 | 2–2–3 | — | 3–3–1 | 2–3–2 | 2–5 | 13–16–6 |
| Philadelphia | 0–5–2 | 3–3–1 | 3–3–1 | — | 5–2 | 2–4–1 | 13–17–5 |
| Pittsburgh | 1–6 | 4–2–1 | 3–2–2 | 2–5 | — | 5–1–1 | 15–16–4 |
| Washington | 5–2 | 2–4–1 | 5–2 | 4–2–1 | 1–5–1 | — | 17–15–3 |

**Vs. Adams Division**

1987–88 NHL records
| Team | **BOS** | **BUF** | **HFD** | **MTL** | **QUE** | **Total** |
|---|---|---|---|---|---|---|
| New Jersey | 1–2 | 0–2–1 | 1–1–1 | 2–1 | 0–3 | 4–9–2 |
| N.Y. Islanders | 2–1 | 2–1 | 2–1 | 0–3 | 2–1 | 8–7–0 |
| N.Y. Rangers | 2–1 | 0–3 | 2–1 | 1–1–1 | 2–1 | 7–7–1 |
| Philadelphia | 2–1 | 3–0 | 2–1 | 0–1–2 | 2–0–1 | 9–3–3 |
| Pittsburgh | 0–2–1 | 2–0–1 | 2–1 | 2–1 | 3–0 | 9–4–2 |
| Washington | 2–1 | 0–2–1 | 2–1 | 1–1–1 | 2–1 | 7–6–2 |

==== Vs. Campbell Conference ====
**Vs. Norris Division**

1987–88 NHL records
| Team | **CHI** | **DET** | **MIN** | **STL** | **TOR** | **Total** |
|---|---|---|---|---|---|---|
| New Jersey | 3–0 | 0–3 | 3–0 | 3–0 | 2–1 | 11–4–0 |
| N.Y. Islanders | 0–1–2 | 1–2 | 1–1–1 | 2–0–1 | 0–3 | 4–7–4 |
| N.Y. Rangers | 2–0–1 | 1–1–1 | 2–1 | 3–0 | 2–1 | 10–3–2 |
| Philadelphia | 0–3 | 2–0–1 | 2–1 | 2–1 | 1–2 | 7–7–1 |
| Pittsburgh | 2–1 | 1–2 | 2–1 | 0–3 | 2–1 | 7–8–0 |
| Washington | 2–1 | 0–2–1 | 2–0–1 | 0–2–1 | 1–1–1 | 5–6–4 |

**Vs. Smythe Division**

1987–88 NHL records
| Team | **CGY** | **EDM** | **LAK** | **VAN** | **WIN** | **Total** |
|---|---|---|---|---|---|---|
| New Jersey | 1–2 | 2–1 | 1–1–1 | 0–3 | 0–2–1 | 4–9–2 |
| N.Y. Islanders | 2–1 | 2–1 | 3–0 | 3–0 | 2–1 | 12–3–0 |
| N.Y. Rangers | 1–2 | 1–2 | 0–3 | 2–1 | 2–0–1 | 6–8–1 |
| Philadelphia | 0–3 | 1–2 | 3–0 | 2–1 | 3–0 | 9–6–0 |
| Pittsburgh | 2–0–1 | 0–3 | 1–0–2 | 1–2 | 1–2 | 5–7–3 |
| Washington | 1–2 | 2–1 | 2–1 | 3–0 | 1–2 | 9–6–0 |

== Schedule and results ==
1987–88 regular season
October

| # | Date | Visitor | Score | Home | Location | Record | Points |
|---|---|---|---|---|---|---|---|
| 1 | Oct 8 | Pittsburgh Penguins | 4–4 OT | New York Rangers | Madison Square Garden (IV) | 0–0–1 | 1 |
| 2 | Oct 9 | Pittsburgh Penguins | 3–6 | New Jersey Devils | Izod Center | 0–1–1 | 1 |
| 3 | Oct 13 | Buffalo Sabres | 3–8 | Pittsburgh Penguins | Civic Arena | 1–1–1 | 3 |
| 4 | Oct 15 | New York Rangers | 6–6 OT | Pittsburgh Penguins | Civic Arena | 1–1–2 | 4 |
| 5 | Oct 17 | Pittsburgh Penguins | 2–3 | Montreal Canadiens | Montreal Forum | 1–2–2 | 4 |
| 6 | Oct 18 | Pittsburgh Penguins | 2–3 | Philadelphia Flyers | The Spectrum | 1–3–2 | 4 |
| 7 | Oct 21 | New Jersey Devils | 5–4 | Pittsburgh Penguins | Civic Arena | 1–4–2 | 4 |
| 8 | Oct 23 | Pittsburgh Penguins | 2–5 | Detroit Red Wings | Joe Louis Arena | 1–5–2 | 4 |
| 9 | Oct 24 | Buffalo Sabres | 3–5 | Pittsburgh Penguins | Civic Arena | 2–5–2 | 6 |
| 10 | Oct 27 | Los Angeles Kings | 4–4 OT | Pittsburgh Penguins | Civic Arena | 2–5–3 | 7 |
| 11 | Oct 29 | Toronto Maple Leafs | 4–0 | Pittsburgh Penguins | Civic Arena | 2–6–3 | 7 |
| 12 | Oct 31 | Pittsburgh Penguins | 5–4 OT | Quebec Nordiques | Quebec Coliseum | 3–6–3 | 9 |

November

| # | Date | Visitor | Score | Home | Location | Record | Points |
|---|---|---|---|---|---|---|---|
| 13 | Nov 3 | Philadelphia Flyers | 1–5 | Pittsburgh Penguins | Civic Arena | 4–6–3 | 11 |
| 14 | Nov 5 | Pittsburgh Penguins | 4–2 | New York Islanders | Nassau Veterans Memorial Coliseum | 5–6–3 | 13 |
| 15 | Nov 7 | Pittsburgh Penguins | 1–4 | Boston Bruins | Boston Garden | 5–7–3 | 13 |
| 16 | Nov 11 | Washington Capitals | 2–3 | Pittsburgh Penguins | Civic Arena | 6–7–3 | 15 |
| 17 | Nov 12 | Pittsburgh Penguins | 2–5 | Philadelphia Flyers | The Spectrum | 6–8–3 | 15 |
| 18 | Nov 14 | New York Rangers | 2–3 OT | Pittsburgh Penguins | Civic Arena | 7–8–3 | 17 |
| 19 | Nov 17 | Pittsburgh Penguins | 4–6 | Vancouver Canucks | Pacific Coliseum | 7–9–3 | 17 |
| 20 | Nov 20 | Pittsburgh Penguins | 1–4 | Edmonton Oilers | Northlands Coliseum | 7–10–3 | 17 |
| 21 | Nov 21 | Pittsburgh Penguins | 4–4 OT | Calgary Flames | Scotiabank Saddledome | 7–10–4 | 18 |
| 22 | Nov 25 | Quebec Nordiques | 4–6 | Pittsburgh Penguins | Civic Arena | 8–10–4 | 20 |
| 23 | Nov 27 | Pittsburgh Penguins | 4–2 | Washington Capitals | Capital Centre | 9–10–4 | 22 |
| 24 | Nov 28 | Washington Capitals | 5–5 OT | Pittsburgh Penguins | Civic Arena | 9–10–5 | 23 |

December

| # | Date | Visitor | Score | Home | Location | Record | Points |
|---|---|---|---|---|---|---|---|
| 25 | Dec 2 | New York Islanders | 7–1 | Pittsburgh Penguins | Civic Arena | 9–11–5 | 23 |
| 26 | Dec 5 | Vancouver Canucks | 3–6 | Pittsburgh Penguins | Civic Arena | 10–11–5 | 25 |
| 27 | Dec 9 | Calgary Flames | 2–5 | Pittsburgh Penguins | Civic Arena | 11–11–5 | 27 |
| 28 | Dec 11 | New York Islanders | 4–6 | Pittsburgh Penguins | Civic Arena | 12–11–5 | 29 |
| 29 | Dec 12 | Pittsburgh Penguins | 2–5 | St. Louis Blues | The Checkerdome | 12–12–5 | 29 |
| 30 | Dec 15 | Philadelphia Flyers | 5–2 | Pittsburgh Penguins | Civic Arena | 12–13–5 | 29 |
| 31 | Dec 17 | Pittsburgh Penguins | 7–4 | New Jersey Devils | Izod Center | 13–13–5 | 31 |
| 32 | Dec 19 | New York Rangers | 3–4 | Pittsburgh Penguins | Civic Arena | 14–13–5 | 33 |
| 33 | Dec 20 | Pittsburgh Penguins | 8–4 | New York Rangers | Madison Square Garden (IV) | 15–13–5 | 35 |
| 34 | Dec 23 | New Jersey Devils | 6–2 | Pittsburgh Penguins | Civic Arena | 15–14–5 | 35 |
| 35 | Dec 26 | Detroit Red Wings | 3–6 | Pittsburgh Penguins | Civic Arena | 16–14–5 | 37 |
| 36 | Dec 27 | Pittsburgh Penguins | 3–3 OT | Buffalo Sabres | Buffalo Memorial Auditorium | 16–14–6 | 38 |
| 37 | Dec 29 | Boston Bruins | 4–4 OT | Pittsburgh Penguins | Civic Arena | 16–14–7 | 39 |

January

| # | Date | Visitor | Score | Home | Location | Record | Points |
|---|---|---|---|---|---|---|---|
| 38 | Jan 1 | Pittsburgh Penguins | 3–5 | Washington Capitals | Capital Centre | 16–15–7 | 39 |
| 39 | Jan 2 | Pittsburgh Penguins | 2–3 | New York Islanders | Nassau Veterans Memorial Coliseum | 16–16–7 | 39 |
| 40 | Jan 5 | Los Angeles Kings | 4–4 OT | Pittsburgh Penguins | Civic Arena | 16–16–8 | 40 |
| 41 | Jan 7 | Boston Bruins | 3–2 | Pittsburgh Penguins | Civic Arena | 16–17–8 | 40 |
| 42 | Jan 9 | Pittsburgh Penguins | 4–5 OT | Hartford Whalers | XL Center | 16–18–8 | 40 |
| 43 | Jan 10 | Pittsburgh Penguins | 5–7 | Detroit Red Wings | Joe Louis Arena | 16–19–8 | 40 |
| 44 | Jan 12 | New York Islanders | 5–5 OT | Pittsburgh Penguins | Civic Arena | 16–19–9 | 41 |
| 45 | Jan 15 | Philadelphia Flyers | 5–4 | Pittsburgh Penguins | Civic Arena | 16–20–9 | 41 |
| 46 | Jan 16 | Pittsburgh Penguins | 4–3 | Toronto Maple Leafs | Maple Leaf Gardens | 17–20–9 | 43 |
| 47 | Jan 19 | Pittsburgh Penguins | 6–4 | New York Islanders | Nassau Veterans Memorial Coliseum | 18–20–9 | 45 |
| 48 | Jan 20 | Pittsburgh Penguins | 8–3 | Chicago Blackhawks | Chicago Stadium | 19–20–9 | 47 |
| 49 | Jan 23 | Pittsburgh Penguins | 4–3 OT | Montreal Canadiens | Montreal Forum | 20–20–9 | 49 |
| 50 | Jan 25 | Edmonton Oilers | 6–4 | Pittsburgh Penguins | Civic Arena | 20–21–9 | 49 |
| 51 | Jan 27 | Winnipeg Jets | 4–1 | Pittsburgh Penguins | Civic Arena | 20–22–9 | 49 |
| 52 | Jan 28 | Pittsburgh Penguins | 3–6 | New Jersey Devils | Izod Center | 20–23–9 | 49 |
| 53 | Jan 30 | Chicago Blackhawks | 2–4 | Pittsburgh Penguins | Civic Arena | 21–23–9 | 51 |

February

| # | Date | Visitor | Score | Home | Location | Record | Points |
|---|---|---|---|---|---|---|---|
| 54 | Feb 2 | Washington Capitals | 2–3 OT | Pittsburgh Penguins | Civic Arena | 22–23–9 | 53 |
| 55 | Feb 4 | Minnesota North Stars | 0–1 | Pittsburgh Penguins | Civic Arena | 23–23–9 | 55 |
| 56 | Feb 6 | Hartford Whalers | 4–5 | Pittsburgh Penguins | Civic Arena | 24–23–9 | 57 |
| 57 | Feb 7 | Pittsburgh Penguins | 3–6 | New York Rangers | Madison Square Garden (IV) | 24–24–9 | 57 |
| 58 | Feb 13 | Pittsburgh Penguins | 7–5 | Los Angeles Kings | The Forum | 25–24–9 | 59 |
| 59 | Feb 17 | Pittsburgh Penguins | 0–5 | Vancouver Canucks | Pacific Coliseum | 25–25–9 | 59 |
| 60 | Feb 19 | Pittsburgh Penguins | 3–7 | Edmonton Oilers | Northlands Coliseum | 25–26–9 | 59 |
| 61 | Feb 21 | St. Louis Blues | 5–4 | Pittsburgh Penguins | Civic Arena | 25–27–9 | 59 |
| 62 | Feb 23 | Winnipeg Jets | 4–3 OT | Pittsburgh Penguins | Civic Arena | 25–28–9 | 59 |
| 63 | Feb 25 | Pittsburgh Penguins | 1–2 | New York Rangers | Madison Square Garden (IV) | 25–29–9 | 59 |
| 64 | Feb 28 | Pittsburgh Penguins | 5–7 | Chicago Blackhawks | Chicago Stadium | 25–30–9 | 59 |

March

| # | Date | Visitor | Score | Home | Location | Record | Points |
|---|---|---|---|---|---|---|---|
| 65 | Mar 1 | Minnesota North Stars | 3–8 | Pittsburgh Penguins | Civic Arena | 26–30–9 | 61 |
| 66 | Mar 5 | New York Islanders | 3–8 | Pittsburgh Penguins | Civic Arena | 27–30–9 | 63 |
| 67 | Mar 7 | Pittsburgh Penguins | 5–4 | Calgary Flames | Scotiabank Saddledome | 28–30–9 | 65 |
| 68 | Mar 10 | Pittsburgh Penguins | 4–6 | St. Louis Blues | The Checkerdome | 28–31–9 | 65 |
| 69 | Mar 12 | Pittsburgh Penguins | 3–6 | Minnesota North Stars | Met Center | 28–32–9 | 65 |
| 70 | Mar 13 | Pittsburgh Penguins | 5–4 | Winnipeg Jets | Winnipeg Arena | 29–32–9 | 67 |
| 71 | Mar 16 | Toronto Maple Leafs | 2–5 | Pittsburgh Penguins | Civic Arena | 30–32–9 | 69 |
| 72 | Mar 19 | Philadelphia Flyers | 0–7 | Pittsburgh Penguins | Civic Arena | 31–32–9 | 71 |
| 73 | Mar 20 | Pittsburgh Penguins | 2–4 | Philadelphia Flyers | The Spectrum | 31–33–9 | 71 |
| 74 | Mar 23 | Washington Capitals | 1–7 | Pittsburgh Penguins | Civic Arena | 32–33–9 | 73 |
| 75 | Mar 25 | Montreal Canadiens | 2–5 | Pittsburgh Penguins | Civic Arena | 33–33–9 | 75 |
| 76 | Mar 27 | Pittsburgh Penguins | 6–3 | Quebec Nordiques | Quebec Coliseum | 34–33–9 | 77 |
| 77 | Mar 29 | Pittsburgh Penguins | 0–4 | New Jersey Devils | Izod Center | 34–34–9 | 77 |
| 78 | Mar 31 | New Jersey Devils | 7–2 | Pittsburgh Penguins | Civic Arena | 34–35–9 | 77 |

April

| # | Date | Visitor | Score | Home | Location | Record | Points |
|---|---|---|---|---|---|---|---|
| 79 | Apr 2 | Pittsburgh Penguins | 7–6 OT | Washington Capitals | Capital Centre | 35–35–9 | 79 |
| 80 | Apr 3 | Hartford Whalers | 2–4 | Pittsburgh Penguins | Civic Arena | 36–35–9 | 81 |

Legend: Win (2 points) Loss (0 points) Tie (1 point)

== Player statistics ==
| = Indicates team leader |

| = Indicates league leader |

Skaters

Regular season
| Player | GP | G | A | Pts | +/− | PIM |
|---|---|---|---|---|---|---|
| Mario Lemieux | 77 | 70 | 98 | 168 | 23 | 92 |
| Dan Quinn | 70 | 40 | 39 | 79 | –8 | 50 |
| Randy Cunneyworth | 71 | 35 | 39 | 74 | 13 | 141 |
| Paul Coffey | 46 | 15 | 52 | 67 | –1 | 93 |
| Doug Bodger | 69 | 14 | 31 | 45 | –4 | 103 |
| Rob Brown | 51 | 24 | 20 | 44 | 8 | 56 |
| Dave Hunter^{†} | 59 | 11 | 18 | 29 | 8 | 77 |
| Charlie Simmer | 50 | 11 | 17 | 28 | 6 | 24 |
| Jock Callander | 41 | 11 | 16 | 27 | –13 | 45 |
| Craig Simpson^{‡} | 21 | 13 | 13 | 26 | 5 | 34 |
| Ville Sirén | 58 | 1 | 20 | 21 | 14 | 62 |
| Dave McLlwain | 66 | 11 | 8 | 19 | –1 | 40 |
| Troy Loney | 65 | 5 | 13 | 18 | –3 | 151 |
| Phil Bourque | 21 | 4 | 12 | 16 | 3 | 20 |
| Dan Frawley | 47 | 6 | 8 | 14 | 0 | 152 |
| Jim Johnson | 55 | 1 | 12 | 13 | –4 | 87 |
| Randy Hillier | 55 | 1 | 12 | 13 | –6 | 144 |
| Rod Buskas | 76 | 4 | 8 | 12 | 6 | 206 |
| Zarley Zalapski | 15 | 3 | 8 | 11 | 10 | 7 |
| Steve Gotaas | 36 | 5 | 6 | 11 | –11 | 45 |
| Moe Mantha Jr.^{‡} | 21 | 2 | 8 | 10 | 6 | 23 |
| Chris Dahlquist | 44 | 3 | 6 | 9 | 3 | 69 |
| Bob Errey | 17 | 3 | 6 | 9 | 6 | 18 |
| Mark Kachowski | 38 | 5 | 3 | 8 | 1 | 126 |
| Wilf Paiement | 23 | 2 | 6 | 8 | –4 | 39 |
| Chris Kontos^{‡} | 36 | 1 | 7 | 8 | –3 | 12 |
| Dave Hannan^{‡} | 21 | 4 | 3 | 7 | –2 | 23 |
| Kevin Stevens | 16 | 5 | 2 | 7 | –6 | 8 |
| Perry Ganchar^{†} | 30 | 2 | 5 | 7 | 0 | 36 |
| Dwight Mathiasen | 23 | 0 | 6 | 6 | –7 | 14 |
| Bryan Erickson^{†} | 11 | 1 | 4 | 5 | 2 | 0 |
| Wayne Van Dorp | 25 | 1 | 3 | 4 | 2 | 75 |
| Chris Joseph^{‡} | 17 | 0 | 4 | 4 | 2 | 12 |
| Norm Schmidt | 5 | 1 | 2 | 3 | 1 | 0 |
| Brad Aitken | 5 | 1 | 1 | 2 | 1 | 0 |
| Lee Giffin | 19 | 0 | 2 | 2 | –2 | 9 |
| Todd Charlesworth | 6 | 2 | 0 | 2 | 0 | 2 |
| Scott Gruhl | 6 | 1 | 0 | 1 | 0 | 0 |
| Warren Young | 7 | 0 | 0 | 0 | –4 | 15 |
| Dave Goertz | 2 | 0 | 0 | 0 | –1 | 2 |
| Pat Mayer | 1 | 0 | 0 | 0 | 0 | 4 |
| Jimmy Mann | 9 | 0 | 0 | 0 | 0 | 53 |
| Total | | 319 | 518 | 837 | — | 2,169 |

Goaltenders

Regular Season
| Player | GP | TOI | W | L | T | GA | GAA | SA | SV% | SO | G | A | PIM |
|---|---|---|---|---|---|---|---|---|---|---|---|---|---|
| Steve Guenette | 19 | 1091:05 | 12 | 7 | 0 | 61 | 3.35 | 582 | 0.895 | 1 | 0 | 0 | 2 |
| Frank Pietrangelo | 21 | 1202:47 | 9 | 11 | 0 | 80 | 3.99 | 599 | 0.866 | 1 | 0 | 2 | 2 |
| Gilles Meloche | 27 | 1390:26 | 8 | 9 | 5 | 95 | 4.10 | 720 | 0.868 | 0 | 0 | 0 | 0 |
| Patrick Riggin | 22 | 1168:55 | 7 | 8 | 4 | 76 | 3.90 | 579 | 0.869 | 0 | 0 | 0 | 12 |
| Total | | 4853:13 | 36 | 35 | 9 | 312 | 3.86 | 2480 | 0.874 | 2 | 0 | 2 | 16 |

^{†}Denotes player spent time with another team before joining the Penguins. Stats reflect time with the Penguins only.
^{‡}Denotes player was traded mid-season. Stats reflect time with the Penguins only.

== Awards and records ==
- Mario Lemieux became the first player to score 60 goals in a season for the Penguins. He did so in a 2–4 loss to Philadelphia on March 20.
- Lemieux became the first player to score 150 points in a season for the Penguins. He did so in a 7–1 win over Washington on March 23.
- Lemieux became the first player to score 160 points in a season for the Penguins. He did so in a 6–3 win over Quebec on March 27.
- Lemieux became the first player to score 70 goals in a season for the Penguins. He did so in a 4–2 win over Hartford on April 3.
- Lemieux established a new franchise record for goals (70), assists (98) and points (168) in a season. He held the previous high in all three categories.
- Lemieux won the Hart Memorial Trophy in 1987-88 NHL Awards Voting, breaking an eight-year consecutive winning streak of Wayne Gretzky. Lemieux finished first with 54 1st place votes, 7 2nd place votes, 1 3rd place vote for 292 votes, besting Grant Fuhr (4 1st place votes, 25 2nd place votes, 11 3rd place votes for 106 votes) and Wayne Gretzky (2 1st place votes, 15 2nd place votes, 18 3rd place votes, for 73 votes).

== Transactions ==
The Penguins were involved in the following transactions during the 1987–88 season:

=== Trades ===
| November 24, 1987 | To Edmonton Oilers Dave Hannan; Chris Joseph; Moe Mantha; Craig Simpson | To Pittsburgh Penguins Paul Coffey; Dave Hunter; Wayne Van Dorp |
| December 17, 1987 | To Montreal Canadiens future considerations (1988 3rd round pick) | To Pittsburgh Penguins Perry Ganchar future considerations (1988 3rd round pick) |
| February 4, 1988 | To Los Angeles Kings Chris Kontos future considerations (1988 6th round pick) | To Pittsburgh Penguins Bryan Erickson |

=== Additions and subtractions ===
Additions
| Player | Former team | Via |
| Jimmy Mann | Quebec Nordiques | free agency (1987-06-16) |
| Pat Mayer | Muskegon Lumberjacks (IHL) | free agency (1987-07-10) |
| Jock Callander | St. Louis Blues | free agency (1987-07-31) |
| Mark Kachowski | Flint Spirits (IHL) | free agency (1987-08-31) |
| Wilf Paiement | Buffalo Sabres | free agency (1987-09-10) |
| Charlie Simmer | Boston Bruins | Waiver Draft (1987-10-05) |
| Scott Gruhl | Muskegon Lumberjacks (IHL) | free agency (1987-12-14) |

Subtractions
| Player | New team | Via |
| John Chabot | Detroit Red Wings | free agency (1987-06-25) |
| Neil Belland | Lukko (SM-liiga) | free agency |
| Kevin LaVallee | Innsbrucker EV (Austria) | free agency |
| Terry Ruskowski | Minnesota North Stars | free agency (1987-07) |
| Dwight Schofield | Winnipeg Jets | free agency (1987-07) |
| Mike Blaisdell | Toronto Maple Leafs | free agency (1987-07-10) |

== Draft picks ==
| Round | # | Player | Pos | Nationality | College/Junior/Club team (League) |
|---|---|---|---|---|---|
| 1 | 5 | Chris Joseph | Defense | Canada | Seattle Thunderbirds (WHL) |
| 2 | 26 | Richard Tabaracci | Goaltender | Canada | Cornwall Royals (OHL) |
| 3 | 47 | Jamie Leach | Right wing | United States | Hamilton Steelhawks (OHL) |
| 4 | 68 | Risto Kurkinen | Left wing | Finland | JyP HT Jyvaskyla (FNL) |
| 5 | 89 | Jeff Waver | Defense | Canada | Hamilton Steelhawks (OHL) |
| 6 | 110 | Shawn McEachern | Left wing | United States | Matignon H.S. (Massachusetts) |
| 7 | 131 | James Bodden | Center | Canada | Chatham (SOJHL) |
| 8 | 152 | Jiri Kucera | Right wing | Czechoslovakia | Dukla Jihlava (Czech) |
| 9 | 173 | Jack MacDougall | Right wing | United States | New Prep School (Massachusetts) |
| 10 | 194 | Daryn McBride | Center | Canada | U. of Denver (NCAA) |
| 11 | 215 | Mark Carlson | Left wing | United States | (Philadelphia Jrs.) |
| 12 | 236 | Ake Lilljebjorn | Goaltender | Sweden | Brynäs IF Gävle (SEL) |
| S1 | 5 | Dan Shea | Left wing | United States | Boston College (Hockey East) |
| S2 | 9 | John Leonard | Defense | United States | Bowdoin College (NESCAC) |

== See also ==
- 1987–88 NHL season
