= 1987–88 New York Rangers season =

NHL hockey team season

1987–88 New York Rangers
- Division: 5th Patrick
- Conference: T-7th Wales
- 1987–88 record: 36–34–10
- Home record: 22–13–5
- Road record: 14–21–5
- Goals for: 300
- Goals against: 283

Team information
- General manager: Phil Esposito
- Coach: Michel Bergeron
- Captain: Ron Greschner (Oct–Dec); Kelly Kisio (Dec–Apr)
- Arena: Madison Square Garden

Team leaders
- Goals: Walt Poddubny (38)
- Assists: Kelly Kisio (55)
- Points: Walt Poddubny (88)
- Penalty minutes: Michel Petit (223)
- Wins: John Vanbiesbrouck (27)
- Goals against average: John Vanbiesbrouck (3.38)

The 1987–88 New York Rangers season was the franchise's 62nd season. The Rangers compiled a 36–34–10 record during the regular season, but despite having 82 points, they were eliminated from playoff contention after their last game when the New Jersey Devils beat the Chicago Blackhawks. It was the first time the Rangers missed the playoffs since the 1976–77 season, and the only time in the 1980s in which the Rangers did not qualify.

== Offseason ==
Rangers General Manager Phil Esposito was part of the four man committee that would select players and coaches for Team Canada at the 1987 Canada Cup.

== Regular season ==
The Rangers led the league in power-play goals scored, with 111. They also scored the fewest short-handed goals during the regular season out of all 21 teams, with just 6.

=== Final standings ===
Patrick Division
	GP	W	L	T	GF	GA	Pts
**New York Islanders**	80	39	31	10	308	267	88
**Philadelphia Flyers**	80	38	33	9	292	292	85
**Washington Capitals**	80	38	33	9	281	249	85
**New Jersey Devils**	80	38	36	6	295	296	82
New York Rangers	80	36	34	10	300	283	82
Pittsburgh Penguins	80	36	35	9	319	316	81

Note: GP = Games played, W = Wins, L = Losses, T = Ties, Pts = Points, GF = Goals for, GA = Goals against
Note: Teams that qualified for the playoffs are highlighted in bold.

=== Record vs. opponents ===
Patrick Division record vs. opponents

==== Vs. Wales Conference ====
**Vs. Patrick Division**

1987–88 NHL records
Team	**NJD**	**NYI**	**NYR**	**PHI**	**PIT**	**WSH**	**Total**
New Jersey	—	3–4	3–4	5–0–2	6–1	2–5	19–14–2
N.Y. Islanders	4–3	—	2–2–3	3–3–1	2–4–1	4–2–1	15–14–6
N.Y. Rangers	4–3	2–2–3	—	3–3–1	2–3–2	2–5	13–16–6
Philadelphia	0–5–2	3–3–1	3–3–1	—	5–2	2–4–1	13–17–5
Pittsburgh	1–6	4–2–1	3–2–2	2–5	—	5–1–1	15–16–4
Washington	5–2	2–4–1	5–2	4–2–1	1–5–1	—	17–15–3

**Vs. Adams Division**

1987–88 NHL records
Team	**BOS**	**BUF**	**HFD**	**MTL**	**QUE**	**Total**
New Jersey	1–2	0–2–1	1–1–1	2–1	0–3	4–9–2
N.Y. Islanders	2–1	2–1	2–1	0–3	2–1	8–7–0
N.Y. Rangers	2–1	0–3	2–1	1–1–1	2–1	7–7–1
Philadelphia	2–1	3–0	2–1	0–1–2	2–0–1	9–3–3
Pittsburgh	0–2–1	2–0–1	2–1	2–1	3–0	9–4–2
Washington	2–1	0–2–1	2–1	1–1–1	2–1	7–6–2

==== Vs. Campbell Conference ====
**Vs. Norris Division**

1987–88 NHL records
Team	**CHI**	**DET**	**MIN**	**STL**	**TOR**	**Total**
New Jersey	3–0	0–3	3–0	3–0	2–1	11–4–0
N.Y. Islanders	0–1–2	1–2	1–1–1	2–0–1	0–3	4–7–4
N.Y. Rangers	2–0–1	1–1–1	2–1	3–0	2–1	10–3–2
Philadelphia	0–3	2–0–1	2–1	2–1	1–2	7–7–1
Pittsburgh	2–1	1–2	2–1	0–3	2–1	7–8–0
Washington	2–1	0–2–1	2–0–1	0–2–1	1–1–1	5–6–4

**Vs. Smythe Division**

1987–88 NHL records
Team	**CGY**	**EDM**	**LAK**	**VAN**	**WIN**	**Total**
New Jersey	1–2	2–1	1–1–1	0–3	0–2–1	4–9–2
N.Y. Islanders	2–1	2–1	3–0	3–0	2–1	12–3–0
N.Y. Rangers	1–2	1–2	0–3	2–1	2–0–1	6–8–1
Philadelphia	0–3	1–2	3–0	2–1	3–0	9–6–0
Pittsburgh	2–0–1	0–3	1–0–2	1–2	1–2	5–7–3
Washington	1–2	2–1	2–1	3–0	1–2	9–6–0

== Schedule and results ==
1987–88 regular season
October: 4–5–3 (home: 2–3–2; road: 2–2–1)

Game	October	Opponent	Score	Record
1	8	Pittsburgh Penguins	4–4 OT	0–0–1
2	10	@ Hartford Whalers	6–2	1–0–1
3	12	Minnesota North Stars	4–2	2–0–1
4	15	@ Pittsburgh Penguins	6–6 OT	2–0–2
5	17	@ Washington Capitals	4–3	2–1–2
6	19	Washington Capitals	4–2	2–2–2
7	21	Calgary Flames	5–4	2–3–2
8	23	Chicago Blackhawks	7–3	3–3–2
9	24	@ Philadelphia Flyers	5–3	4–3–2
10	26	Philadelphia Flyers	2–2 OT	4–3–3
11	28	Los Angeles Kings	4–3	4–4–3
12	31	@ New York Islanders	8–2	4–5–3

November: 4–8–0 (home: 3–2–0; road: 1–6–0)

Game	November	Opponent	Score	Record
13	1	Edmonton Oilers	7–6	4–6–3
14	3	@ Calgary Flames	5–3	4–7–3
15	4	@ Edmonton Oilers	7–2	4–8–3
16	7	@ Los Angeles Kings	5–4	4–9–3
17	10	New Jersey Devils	3–2	4–10–3
18	14	@ Pittsburgh Penguins	3–2 OT	4–11–3
19	15	Winnipeg Jets	6–4	5–11–3
20	19	@ Minnesota North Stars	4–3	5–12–3
21	20	@ Winnipeg Jets	4–3	6–12–3
22	25	Toronto Maple Leafs	5–3	7–12–3
23	28	@ New York Islanders	5–4	7–13–3
24	29	New York Islanders	3–1	8–13–3

December: 6–6–2 (home: 4–2–1; road: 2–4–1)

Game	December	Opponent	Score	Record
25	3	@ Boston Bruins	4–3	8–14–3
26	5	@ St. Louis Blues	3–2	9–14–3
27	9	Montreal Canadiens	2–2 OT	9–14–4
28	10	@ Philadelphia Flyers	5–3	9–15–4
29	12	@ Toronto Maple Leafs	4–3	9–16–4
30	14	Detroit Red Wings	4–3	10–16–4
31	16	New Jersey Devils	9–3	11–16–4
32	19	@ Pittsburgh Penguins	4–3	11–17–4
33	20	Pittsburgh Penguins	8–4	11–18–4
34	22	Philadelphia Flyers	6–4	11–19–4
35	26	@ New Jersey Devils	5–3	12–19–4
36	27	Boston Bruins	4–1	13–19–4
37	29	@ New York Islanders	3–3 OT	13–19–5
38	31	Quebec Nordiques	6–1	14–19–5

January: 6–6–1 (home: 2–2–1; road: 4–4–0)

Game	January	Opponent	Score	Record
39	2	@ Minnesota North Stars	5–3	15–19–5
40	4	St. Louis Blues	6–2	16–19–5
41	6	Vancouver Canucks	4–2	17–19–5
42	8	@ Washington Capitals	8–4	17–20–5
43	10	@ Buffalo Sabres	4–3	17–21–5
44	11	Chicago Blackhawks	2–2 OT	17–21–6
45	13	Detroit Red Wings	7–4	17–22–6
46	16	@ Montreal Canadiens	4–3	17–23–6
47	17	Philadelphia Flyers	2–1	17–24–6
48	19	@ Los Angeles Kings	6–3	17–25–6
49	22	@ Vancouver Canucks	6–3	18–25–6
50	28	@ Philadelphia Flyers	5–2	19–25–6
51	30	@ Boston Bruins	4–2	20–25–6

February: 7–4–2 (home: 5–2–1; road: 2–2–1)

Game	February	Opponent	Score	Record
52	2	@ New York Islanders	2–2 OT	20–25–7
53	4	@ Quebec Nordiques	3–2	20–26–7
54	6	@ Washington Capitals	3–0	21–26–7
55	7	Pittsburgh Penguins	6–3	22–26–7
56	11	Washington Capitals	5–3	22–27–7
57	14	New York Islanders	4–4 OT	22–27–8
58	15	Montreal Canadiens	3–1	23–27–8
59	17	Calgary Flames	5–3	24–27–8
60	19	@ New Jersey Devils	6–3	24–28–8
61	21	Vancouver Canucks	6–4	24–29–8
62	25	Pittsburgh Penguins	2–1	25–29–8
63	26	@ New Jersey Devils	2–1	26–29–8
64	29	St. Louis Blues	5–2	27–29–8

March: 8–5–1 (home: 5–2–0; road: 3–3–1)

Game	March	Opponent	Score	Record
65	2	New York Islanders	3–1	28–29–8
66	4	@ Buffalo Sabres	6–3	28–30–8
67	5	@ Hartford Whalers	3–1	28–31–8
68	8	New Jersey Devils	7–4	29–31–8
69	12	@ Washington Capitals	4–2	30–31–8
70	15	Philadelphia Flyers	3–1	31–31–8
71	16	Washington Capitals	8–4	31–32–8
72	19	@ Toronto Maple Leafs	4–3	32–32–8
73	20	Hartford Whalers	2–1	33–32–8
74	22	Buffalo Sabres	3–2	33–33–8
75	24	Edmonton Oilers	6–1	34–33–8
76	26	@ Detroit Red Wings	4–4 OT	34–33–9
77	27	@ New Jersey Devils	7–2	34–34–9
78	30	@ Chicago Blackhawks	4–3	35–34–9

April: 1–0–1 (home: 1–0–0; road: 0–0–1)

Game	April	Opponent	Score	Record
79	1	@ Winnipeg Jets	6–6 OT	35–34–10
80	3	Quebec Nordiques	3–0	36–34–10

Legend: Win (2 points) Loss (0 points) Tie (1 point)

== Playoffs ==
The Rangers failed to qualify for the 1988 Stanley Cup playoffs. After a 6–6 tie against the Winnipeg Jets in the second-to-last game of the season, the Rangers and New Jersey Devils entered their final game of the season with 80 points each. If the Rangers and Devils won, the Devils would go to the playoffs on a tiebreaker. The Rangers defeated the Quebec Nordiques 3–0. Later that night, however, the Devils defeated the Chicago Blackhawks in overtime to win the tiebreaker and the final Patrick Division spot. Both the Rangers and Devils finished tied with 82 points. However, the Devils had 38 wins to the Rangers' 36, so the Devils qualified for the final playoff spot in the Patrick Division.

== Player statistics ==
Skaters

Regular season
Player	GP	G	A	Pts	+/-	PIM
Walt Poddubny	77	38	50	88	2	76
Kelly Kisio	77	23	55	78	8	88
Tomas Sandstrom	69	28	40	68	−6	95
Marcel Dionne	67	31	34	65	−14	54
James Patrick	70	17	45	62	16	52
Brian Mullen	74	25	29	54	−2	42
John Ogrodnick	64	22	32	54	−3	16
Ulf Dahlen	70	29	23	52	5	26
Don Maloney	66	12	21	33	12	60
Michel Petit^{†}	64	9	24	33	3	223
David Shaw	68	7	25	32	−8	100
Lucien DeBlois	74	9	21	30	−3	103
Jan Erixon	70	7	19	26	3	33
Norm Maciver	37	9	15	24	10	14
Paul Cyr^{†}	40	4	13	17	−5	41
Jari Gronstrand	62	3	11	14	8	63
Brian Leetch	17	2	12	14	5	0
Pierre Larouche	10	3	9	12	−3	13
Ron Duguay^{‡}	44	4	4	8	−9	23
Chris Nilan^{†}	22	3	5	8	0	96
Ron Greschner	51	1	5	6	−9	82
Gordie Walker	18	1	4	5	−8	17
Mike Donnelly^{‡}	17	2	2	4	−5	8
Mark Hardy^{†}	19	2	2	4	−5	31
Dave Pichette	6	1	3	4	−2	4
Willie Huber^{‡}	11	1	3	4	−4	14
Joe Paterson^{†}	21	1	3	4	−4	63
Bruce Bell	13	1	2	3	−10	8
Mark Tinordi	24	1	2	3	−5	50
Steve Nemeth	12	2	0	2	−4	2
Jeff Brubaker	31	2	0	2	0	78
Paul Boutilier^{‡}	4	0	1	1	−1	6
Simon Wheeldon	5	0	1	1	−2	4
Ron Talakoski	6	0	1	1	0	12
Chris Jensen	7	0	1	1	−1	2
Larry Melnyk	14	0	1	1	−7	34
Jim Pavese^{†‡}	14	0	1	1	−7	48
Mark Janssens	1	0	0	0	0	0
Rudy Poeschek	1	0	0	0	0	2
Mike Siltala	3	0	0	0	0	0
Curt Giles^{‡}	13	0	0	0	−5	10

Goaltenders

Regular season
Player	GP	TOI	W	L	T	GA	GAA	SA	SV%	SO
John Vanbiesbrouck	56	3319	27	22	7	187	3.38	1697	.890	2
Bob Froese	25	1443	8	11	3	85	3.53	695	.878	0
Ron Scott	2	90	1	1	0	6	4.00	41	.854	0

^{†}Denotes player spent time with another team before joining Rangers. Stats reflect time with Rangers only.
^{‡}Traded mid-season. Stats reflect time with Rangers only.

Note:

Pos = Position;GP = Games played; G = Goals; A = Assists; Pts = Points; PIM = Penalty minutes; +/- = Plus/minus; PPG = Power-play goals; SHG = Short-handed goals; GWG = Game-winning goals
Pos = Position;GP = Games played; Min, TOI = Minutes played; W = Wins; L = Losses; T,T/OT = Ties; OTL = Overtime losses; GA = Goals-against; GAA = Goals-against average; SO = Shutouts; SA = Shots against; SV = Shots saved;SV% = Save percentage;

== Draft picks ==
New York's picks at the 1987 NHL entry draft in Detroit, Michigan at the Joe Louis Arena.

Round	#	Player	Position	Nationality	College/Junior/Club team (League)
1	10	Jayson More	D	Canada	New Westminster Bruins (WHL)
2	31	Daniel Lacroix	LW	Canada	Granby Bisons (QMJHL)
3	46	Simon Gagne	RW	Canada	Laval Titan (QMJHL)
4	69	Mike Sullivan	C	United States	Boston University (NCAA)
5	94	Eric O'Borsky	C	United States	Yale University (NCAA)
6	115	Ludek Cajka	D	Czechoslovakia	Dukla Jihlava (Czech Extraliga)
7	136	Clint Thomas	D	United States	Bartlett H.S. (Alaska)
8	157	Chuck Wiegand	RW	United States	Essex Junction H.S. (Vermont)
9	178	Eric Burrill	RW	United States	Tartan H.S. (Massachusetts)
10	199	Dave Porter	F	United States	Northern Michigan University (NCAA)
10	205	Brett Barnett	LW	Canada	Wexford Raiders (OPJHL)
11	220	Lance Marciano	D	United States	Choate Academy (Connecticut)

=== Supplemental Draft ===
New York's picks at the 1987 NHL supplemental draft.

Round	#	Player	Position	Nationality	College/Junior/Club team (League)
2	12	Joe Lockwood	RW	United States	University of Michigan (CCHA)

== See also ==
- 1987–88 NHL season
