= Alain Raymond =

Canadian ice hockey player (born 1965)

- Born: June 24, 1965 (age 60) Rimouski, Quebec, Canada
- Height: 5 ft 11 in (180 cm)
- Weight: 175 lb (79 kg; 12 st 7 lb)
- Position: Goaltender
- Caught: Left
- Played for: Washington Capitals
- National team: Canada
- NHL draft: 215th overall, 1983; Washington Capitals
- Playing career: 1986–1992

Alain Raymond (born June 24, 1965) is a Canadian former professional ice hockey goaltender. He played one game in the National Hockey League with the Washington Capitals during the 1987–88 season. The rest of his career, which lasted from 1986 to 1992, was spent in the minor leagues.

== Playing career ==
Raymond played one game in the National Hockey League with the Washington Capitals during the 1987–88 season, on December 9, 1987, against the Hartford Whalers. He gave up two goals in the two periods that he played.

In his first full IHL season with the Fort Wayne Komets, Raymond won the James Norris Memorial Trophy, awarded to the goaltenders with the fewest goals against in the regular season.

Raymond split most of his time during the 1989–90 season between two clubs. He played 31 games with the ECHL's Hampton Roads Admirals and played another 11 games with their parent club, the AHL's Baltimore Skipjacks. Raymond went 17–12–1 with a 3.60 GAA, earning him named the starting goalie on the East Coast Hockey League's all-star team.

Raymond later became a goaltender coach with the Rimouski Oceanic of the QMJHL.

== Career statistics ==
=== Regular season and playoffs ===
			Regular season									Playoffs
Season	Team	League	GP	W	L	T	MIN	GA	SO	GAA	SV%	GP	W	L	MIN	GA	SO	GAA	SV%
1980–81	Cantons de l'Est Cantonniers	QMAAA	16	7	7	2	960	83	0	5.16	—	—	—	—	—	—	—	—	—
1981–82	Cantons de l'Est Cantonniers	QMAAA	19	13	4	2	1140	97	0	5.14	—	8	6	2	365	21	0	3.45	—
1982–83	Hull Olympiques	QMJHL	17	5	8	0	809	80	0	5.93	.848	—	—	—	—	—	—	—	—
1982–83	Trois-Rivières Draveurs	QMJHL	22	7	11	2	1176	124	0	6.33	.841	2	0	2	120	12	0	6.00	.867
1983–84	Trois-Rivières Draveurs	QMJHL	53	18	25	0	2725	223	2	4.91	.865	—	—	—	—	—	—	—	—
1984–85	Trois-Rivières Draveurs	QMJHL	58	29	26	1	3295	220	2	4.01	.879	7	3	4	438	32	0	4.38	.891
1985–86	Canadian National Team	Intl	46	25	18	3	2571	151	4	3.52	.885	—	—	—	—	—	—	—	—
1986–87	Fort Wayne Komets	IHL	45	23	16	0	2433	134	1	3.30	.893	6	2	3	320	23	0	4.31	—
1987–88	Washington Capitals	NHL	1	0	1	0	40	2	0	3.06	.900	—	—	—	—	—	—	—	—
1987–88	Fort Wayne Komets	IHL	40	20	15	3	2271	142	2	3.75	.874	2	0	1	67	7	0	6.27	—
1988–89	Baltimore Skipjacks	AHL	41	14	22	2	2301	162	0	4.22	.863	—	—	—	—	—	—	—	—
1989–90	Baltimore Skipjacks	AHL	11	4	5	2	612	34	0	3.33	.894	—	—	—	—	—	—	—	—
1989–90	Hampton Roads Admirals	ECHL	31	17	12	1	2048	123	0	3.60	.891	5	2	3	302	24	0	4.77	—
1990–91	Peoria Rivermen	IHL	5	1	3	1	304	22	0	4.34	.835	—	—	—	—	—	—	—	—
1990–91	Nashville Knights	ECHL	43	21	18	3	2508	189	1	4.52	.887	—	—	—	—	—	—	—	—
1991–92	Peoria Rivermen	IHL	6	1	3	2	370	27	0	4.38	—	—	—	—	—	—	—	—	—
IHL totals			96	45	37	6	5378	325	3	3.63	—	8	2	4	387	30	0	4.65	—
NHL totals			1	0	1	0	40	2	0	3.06	.900	—	—	—	—	—	—	—	—

== See also ==
- List of players who played only one game in the NHL
