= Peter Sundström =

Swedish ice hockey player

- Born: 14 December 1961 (age 64) Skellefteå, Sweden
- Height: 6 ft 0 in (183 cm)
- Weight: 181 lb (82 kg; 12 st 13 lb)
- Position: Left wing
- Shot: Left
- Played for: New York Rangers; Washington Capitals; New Jersey Devils
- National team: Sweden
- NHL draft: 50th overall, 1981; New York Rangers
- Playing career: 1978–1995

Medal record

Representing Sweden

Ice hockey

World Championships
Gold medal – first place	1987 Vienna	

World Junior Championships
Gold medal – first place	1981 West Germany	

Olof Peter Walentin Sundström (born 14 December 1961) is a Swedish former professional ice hockey player, and is the twin brother of former National Hockey League player Patrik Sundström. He currently works as a European scout for the Chicago Blackhawks.

== Career ==
Selected by the New York Rangers in the 1981 NHL entry draft, he played parts of three seasons for the Rangers. He sat out a year before signing with the Washington Capitals and played with them for two seasons.

Sundström was traded to the New Jersey Devils prior to the start of the 1989–90 NHL season, and played with his brother Patrik on the Devils that season. He played hockey in Sweden during the next five years before he retired in 1995.

== Career statistics ==
=== Regular season and playoffs ===
			Regular season					Playoffs
Season	Team	League	GP	G	A	Pts	PIM	GP	G	A	Pts	PIM
1978–79	IF Björklöven	SEL	1	0	0	0	0	—	—	—	—	—
1979–80	IF Björklöven	SEL	8	0	0	0	2	—	—	—	—	—
1980–81	IF Björklöven	SEL	29	7	2	9	8	—	—	—	—	—
1981–82	IF Björklöven	SEL	35	10	14	24	18	7	2	1	3	0
1982–83	IF Björklöven	SEL	33	14	11	25	26	3	2	0	2	4
1983–84	New York Rangers	NHL	77	22	22	44	24	5	1	3	4	0
1984–85	New York Rangers	NHL	73	18	26	44	34	3	0	0	0	0
1985–86	New York Rangers	NHL	53	8	15	23	12	1	0	0	0	2
1985–86	New Haven Nighthawks	AHL	8	3	6	9	4	—	—	—	—	—
1986–87	IF Björklöven	SEL	36	22	16	38	44	6	2	5	7	8
1987–88	Washington Capitals	NHL	78	8	17	25	34	14	2	0	2	6
1988–89	Washington Capitals	NHL	35	4	2	6	14	—	—	—	—	—
1989–90	New Jersey Devils	NHL	21	1	2	3	4	—	—	—	—	—
1989–90	Utica Devils	AHL	31	11	28	39	6	5	4	1	5	0
1990–91	Malmö IF	SEL	40	12	19	31	50	2	1	0	1	4
1991–92	Malmö IF	SEL	40	10	17	27	36	10	5	6	11	2
1992–93	Malmö IF	SEL	40	11	15	26	36	6	1	0	1	18
1993–94	Malmö IF	SEL	40	4	14	18	28	11	5	2	7	8
1994–95	Malmö IF	SEL	40	9	13	22	30	9	1	4	5	2
SEL totals			342	99	121	220	278	54	19	18	37	46
NHL totals			335	61	84	145	122	23	3	3	6	8

=== International ===
Year	Team	Event	GP	G	A	Pts	PIM
1981	Sweden	WJC	5	2	3	5	4
1982	Sweden	WC	8	3	1	4	2
1983	Sweden	WC	10	3	3	6	2
1984	Sweden	CC	8	2	2	4	8
1987	Sweden	WC	10	1	1	2	6
1987	Sweden	CC	6	1	0	1	2
Senior totals			42	10	7	17	20
