= Claude Loiselle =

Canadian ice hockey player (born 1963)

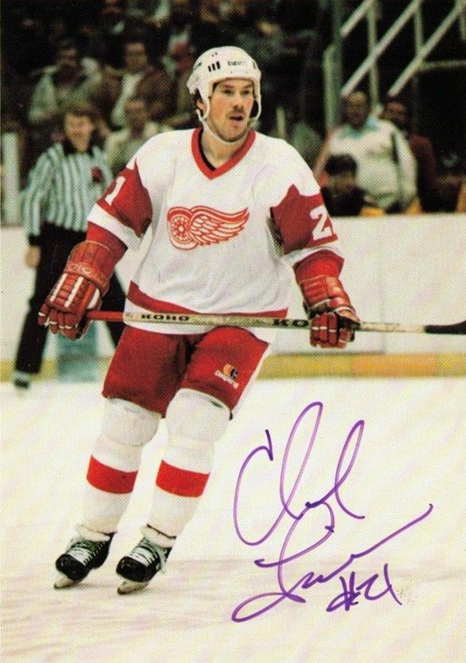
- Born: May 29, 1963 (age 63) Ottawa, Ontario, Canada
- Height: 5 ft 11 in (180 cm)
- Weight: 190 lb (86 kg; 13 st 8 lb)
- Position: Centre
- Shot: Left
- Played for: Detroit Red Wings; New Jersey Devils; Quebec Nordiques; Toronto Maple Leafs; New York Islanders
- NHL draft: 23rd overall, 1981; Detroit Red Wings
- Playing career: 1981–1994

Claude Loiselle (born May 29, 1963) is a Canadian former professional ice hockey forward who played 13 seasons in the National Hockey League (NHL) from 1981 to 1994.

== Playing career ==
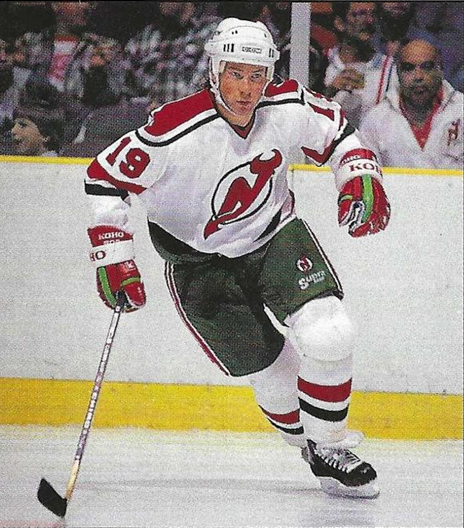
1988 card of Loiselle for New Jersey Devils

As a youth, Loiselle played in the 1975 Quebec International Pee-Wee Hockey Tournament with a minor ice hockey team from East Ottawa.

Loiselle played with the Ontario Hockey League's (OHL) Windsor Spitfires and the Adirondack Red Wings of the American Hockey League (AHL) before embarking on his NHL career. Loiselle started his NHL career with the Detroit Red Wings in 1981–82 after being selected in the second round, 23rd overall in the 1981 NHL entry draft.

He was traded along with Joe Cirella from the New Jersey Devils to the Quebec Nordiques for Walt Poddubny on June 17, 1989.

In 616 career games spent with the Red Wings, Devils, Nordiques, Toronto Maple Leafs and New York Islanders he recorded 92 goals, 117 assists and 1,149 minutes in penalties. He also competed in 41 career NHL playoff games and was a member of two Patrick Division championship-winning teams; New Jersey in 1988 and the Islanders in 1993.

== Management career ==
He retired after the 1993–94 NHL season. Loiselle spent seven years as associate director of hockey operations for the NHL and was involved in salary arbitration, discipline and collective bargaining, while also serving as the liaison on hockey operation matters between the NHL and the AHL. Starting in 2005, he was the assistant general manager for the Tampa Bay Lightning and in 2007 general manager of the Lightning's AHL affiliate, the Norfolk Admirals.

On May 29, 2010, Loiselle agreed to terms on a contract with the Maple Leafs as their assistant general manager, working alongside Brian Burke, the Maple Leafs' then-general manager. He continued to serve as assistant general manager of the Toronto Maple Leafs and vice president of hockey operations of Maple Leafs Sports and Entertainment. On July 22, 2014, the Maple Leafs announced they had fired Loiselle along with most other members of the executive management team following the removal of GM Brian Burke.

On July 31, 2015, Loiselle was hired by the Arizona Coyotes as a hockey operations consultant.

In 2016, the New York Islanders hired Loiselle as Hockey Operations Consultant and later promoted him to Vice President of Hockey Operations.

== Personal life ==
Loiselle was born in Ottawa, Ontario. He started his undergraduate studies while playing for the Islanders in 1992 and earned his law degree from McGill University in 1998, the same year he was admitted to the New York State Bar.

== Career statistics ==
			Regular season					Playoffs
Season	Team	League	GP	G	A	Pts	PIM	GP	G	A	Pts	PIM
1979–80	Gloucester Rangers	CJHL	50	21	38	59	26	—	—	—	—	—
1980–81	Windsor Spitfires	OHL	68	38	56	94	103	11	3	3	6	40
1981–82	Detroit Red Wings	NHL	4	1	0	1	2	—	—	—	—	—
1981–82	Windsor Spitfires	OHL	68	36	73	109	192	9	2	10	12	42
1982–83	Detroit Red Wings	NHL	18	2	0	2	15	—	—	—	—	—
1982–83	Windsor Spitfires	OHL	48	39	49	88	75	3	3	3	6	11
1982–83	Adirondack Red Wings	AHL	6	1	7	8	0	6	2	4	6	0
1983–84	Detroit Red Wings	NHL	28	4	6	10	32	—	—	—	—	—
1983–84	Adirondack Red Wings	AHL	29	13	16	29	59	—	—	—	—	—
1984–85	Detroit Red Wings	NHL	30	8	1	9	45	3	0	2	2	0
1984–85	Adirondack Red Wings	AHL	47	22	29	51	24	—	—	—	—	—
1985–86	Detroit Red Wings	NHL	48	7	15	22	142	—	—	—	—	—
1985–86	Adirondack Red Wings	AHL	21	15	11	26	32	16	5	10	15	38
1986–87	New Jersey Devils	NHL	75	16	24	40	137	—	—	—	—	—
1987–88	New Jersey Devils	NHL	68	17	18	35	118	20	4	6	10	52
1988–89	New Jersey Devils	NHL	74	7	14	21	209	—	—	—	—	—
1989–90	Quebec Nordiques	NHL	72	11	14	25	104	—	—	—	—	—
1990–91	Quebec Nordiques	NHL	59	5	10	15	86	—	—	—	—	—
1990–91	Toronto Maple Leafs	NHL	7	1	1	2	2	—	—	—	—	—
1991–92	Toronto Maple Leafs	NHL	64	6	9	15	102	—	—	—	—	—
1991–92	New York Islanders	NHL	11	1	1	2	13	—	—	—	—	—
1992–93	New York Islanders	NHL	41	5	3	8	90	18	0	3	3	10
1993–94	New York Islanders	NHL	17	1	1	2	49	—	—	—	—	—
AHL totals			103	51	63	114	115	22	7	14	21	38
NHL totals			616	92	117	209	1146	41	4	11	15	62
