= Bobby Gould (ice hockey) =

Canadian ice hockey player (1957–2026)

- Born: September 2, 1957 Petrolia, Ontario, Canada
- Died: October 9, 2026 (aged 69) Sarnia, Ontario, Canada
- Height: 5 ft 11 in (180 cm)
- Weight: 195 lb (88 kg; 13 st 13 lb)
- Position: Right wing
- Shot: Right
- Played for: Atlanta Flames; Calgary Flames; Washington Capitals; Boston Bruins
- NHL draft: 118th overall, 1977; Atlanta Flames
- WHA draft: 70th overall, 1977; Calgary Cowboys
- Playing career: 1979–1991

Robert Alexander Gould (September 2, 1957 – October 9, 2026) was a Canadian professional ice hockey player. He played eleven seasons in the National Hockey League (NHL) between 1980 and 1990 with the Atlanta Flames, Calgary Flames, Washington Capitals, and Boston Bruins.

== College career ==
Gould was drafted by the OHL St. Catharines team in the second round of the 1974 OHL draft, but chose to remain in the Western Jr. B league to attend college. Gould played college hockey for the University of New Hampshire Wildcats from 1975-79, leading the team to the Frozen Four in 1977 and 1979. During his college career he scored 191 points (91 goals and 101 assists). As of the end of the 2025-26 season, Gould ranks fifth in all-time goals and seventh in all-time points for UNH. In 1988 he was inducted into the UNH Athletics Hall of Fame.

== Professional career ==
Gould was drafted by the Atlanta Flames of the National Hockey League in the seventh round, 118th overall, of the 1977 NHL amateur draft. He was also drafted by the Calgary Cowboys of the World Hockey Association in the eighth round, 70th overall, of the 1977 WHA Amateur Draft. Gould never played in the WHA, although he did eventually play in Calgary; after one game for the Atlanta Flames in 1979–80 he relocated to Calgary with the team the following season. He played parts of the next two seasons, 1980–81 and 1981–82, for the Calgary Flames before being traded to the Washington Capitals on November 25, 1981, along with Randy Holt for Pat Ribble and a second round selection from the 1983 NHL entry draft.

After three seasons of bouncing between the minors and the NHL, Gould finally got a chance to play full-time at the NHL level with the Capitals and made the most of it, scoring 18 goals and 31 points in his first 60 games. He continued to play well with three straight seasons with over 20 goals, peaking in 1986–87 with a career-high 23 goals and 50 points.

He is also remembered for a March 20, 1987, fight with Mario Lemieux. Giving up 5 inches and 25 lbs, Gould ended up breaking Lemieux's jaw with a solid right uppercut. Lemieux spent the night at George Washington University Hospital. "The first thing that came to mind when he said, 'Let's go,' was that I could get him off the ice for five minutes," Gould said. "I never thought about hurting him." Lemieux would not fight again in the NHL for another 9 years.

Nearing the end of his career, Gould was traded by the Capitals to the Boston Bruins for defenseman Alain Cote on September 28, 1989. This was Gould's final NHL season, and he helped the Bruins reach the Stanley Cup finals, including advancing past his former team, the Capitals. Gould played and also served as an assistant coach for the Maine Mariners of the American Hockey League in 1990–91 before retiring altogether from playing.

In 697 NHL games, he finished with 145 goals and 159 assists. Gould twice finished third in voting for the NHL's Frank J. Selke Trophy, awarded for the league's top defensive forward (1983 and 1987).

== Personal life and death ==
Following his playing career, Gould continued coaching at various amateur levels near his hometown of Petrolia, Ontario. Gould also worked as a teacher and worked the farm he lived on with his wife and kids.

Gould died in Sarnia, Ontario, on October 9, 2026, aged 69.

== Career statistics ==
=== Regular season and playoffs ===
			Regular season					Playoffs
Season	Team	League	GP	G	A	Pts	PIM	GP	G	A	Pts	PIM
1974–75	Petrolia Jets	WOHL	—	23	32	55	103	—	—	—	—	—
1975–76	University of New Hampshire	ECAC	31	13	14	27	16	—	—	—	—	—
1976–77	University of New Hampshire	ECAC	39	24	25	49	36	—	—	—	—	—
1977–78	University of New Hampshire	ECAC	30	23	34	57	40	—	—	—	—	—
1978–79	University of New Hampshire	ECAC	35	31	28	59	46	—	—	—	—	—
1978–79	Tulsa Oilers	CHL	5	2	0	2	4	—	—	—	—	—
1979–80	Birmingham Bulls	CHL	79	27	33	60	73	4	2	4	6	0
1979–80	Atlanta Flames	NHL	1	0	0	0	0	—	—	—	—	—
1980–81	Birmingham Bulls	CHL	58	25	25	50	43	—	—	—	—	—
1980–81	Fort Worth Texans	CHL	18	8	6	14	6	5	5	2	7	10
1980–81	Calgary Flames	NHL	3	0	0	0	0	11	3	1	4	4
1981–82	Oklahoma City Stars	CHL	1	0	1	1	0	—	—	—	—	—
1981–82	Calgary Flames	NHL	16	3	0	3	4	—	—	—	—	—
1981–82	Washington Capitals	NHL	60	18	13	31	69	—	—	—	—	—
1982–83	Washington Capitals	NHL	80	22	18	40	43	4	5	0	5	4
1983–84	Washington Capitals	NHL	78	21	19	40	74	5	0	2	2	4
1984–85	Washington Capitals	NHL	78	14	19	33	69	5	0	1	1	2
1985–86	Washington Capitals	NHL	79	19	19	38	26	9	4	3	7	11
1986–87	Washington Capitals	NHL	78	23	27	50	74	7	0	3	3	8
1987–88	Washington Capitals	NHL	72	12	14	26	56	14	3	1	4	21
1988–89	Washington Capitals	NHL	75	5	13	18	65	6	0	2	2	0
1989–90	Boston Bruins	NHL	77	8	17	25	92	17	0	0	0	4
1990–91	Maine Mariners	AHL	71	10	15	25	30	2	0	0	0	0
NHL totals			697	145	159	304	572	78	15	13	28	58

== Awards and honors ==
Award	Year
All-ECAC Hockey Second Team	1978–79
