= Mark Kachowski =

Canadian ice hockey player

- Born: February 20, 1965 (age 60) Edmonton, Alberta, Canada
- Height: 5 ft 11 in (180 cm)
- Weight: 200 lb (91 kg; 14 st 4 lb)
- Position: Left wing
- Shot: Left
- Played for: Pittsburgh Penguins
- NHL draft: Undrafted
- Playing career: 1983–1992

Mark Edward Kachowski (born February 20, 1965) is a Canadian former ice hockey player. A left winger, he played three seasons in the National Hockey League (NHL) for the Pittsburgh Penguins from 1987 to 1990. Kachowski was born in Edmonton, Alberta.

== Career statistics ==
=== Regular season and playoffs ===
			Regular season					Playoffs
Season	Team	League	GP	G	A	Pts	PIM	GP	G	A	Pts	PIM
1982–83	Williams Lake Mustangs	PCJHL	—	—	—	—	—	—	—	—	—	—
1983–84	Kamloops Junior Oilers	WHL	57	6	9	15	156	16	4	2	6	29
1983–84	Kamloops Junior Oilers	M-Cup	—	—	—	—	—	4	0	1	1	42
1984–85	Kamloops Blazers	WHL	68	22	15	37	185	14	6	8	14	38
1985–86	Kamloops Blazers	WHL	61	21	31	52	182	16	7	8	15	57
1985–86	Kamloops Blazers	M-Cup	—	—	—	—	—	5	1	5	6	11
1986–87	Flint Spirits	IHL	75	18	13	31	273	6	1	1	2	21
1987–88	Pittsburgh Penguins	NHL	38	5	3	8	126	—	—	—	—	—
1987–88	Muskegon Lumberjacks	IHL	25	3	6	9	72	5	0	2	2	11
1988–89	Pittsburgh Penguins	NHL	12	1	1	2	43	—	—	—	—	—
1988–89	Muskegon Lumberjacks	IHL	57	8	8	16	167	8	1	2	3	17
1989–90	Pittsburgh Penguins	NHL	14	0	1	1	40	—	—	—	—	—
1989–90	Muskegon Lumberjacks	IHL	62	23	8	31	129	12	2	4	6	41
1990–91	Muskegon Lumberjacks	IHL	80	19	21	40	108	5	1	1	2	9
1991–92	Muskegon Lumberjacks	IHL	6	0	0	0	9	4	2	0	2	16
IHL totals			304	71	56	127	758	40	7	10	17	95
NHL totals			64	6	5	11	209	—	—	—	—	—
