= Patrik Sundström =

Swedish ice hockey player

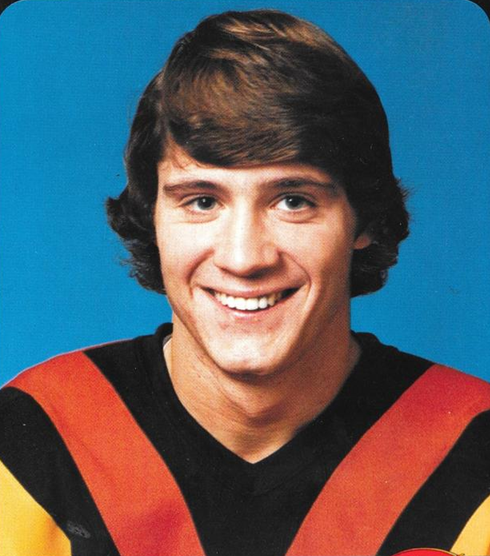
- Sundström in 1982 card
- Born: 14 December 1961 (age 64) Skellefteå, Sweden
- Height: 6 ft 0 in (183 cm)
- Weight: 205 lb (93 kg; 14 st 9 lb)
- Position: Centre
- Shot: Left
- Played for: IF Björklöven; Vancouver Canucks; New Jersey Devils
- National team: Sweden
- NHL draft: 175th overall, 1980; Vancouver Canucks
- Playing career: 1982–1992

Medal record

Representing Sweden

Ice hockey

World Junior Championships
Gold medal – first place	1981 West Germany	
Bronze medal – third place	1980 Finland	

World Championships
Silver medal – second place	1981 Sweden	

Canada Cup
Silver medal – second place	1984 Canada	

Olof Patric Waldemar Sundström (born 14 December 1961) is a Swedish former professional ice hockey player. He played in the National Hockey League (NHL) for 10 seasons.

== Playing career ==
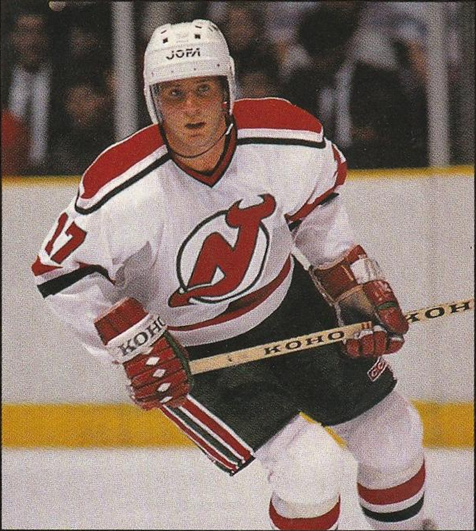
Sundström in 1988 card for New Jersey Devils

Sundström was drafted 175th overall by the Vancouver Canucks in the 1980 NHL entry draft.

One of the best players developed by IF Björklöven in Umeå, with whom he played for three full seasons, in 1982 he headed overseas to play in the NHL with the Vancouver Canucks. Sundström played in Vancouver for five seasons before being traded to the New Jersey Devils on September 15, 1987 for Kirk McLean, Greg Adams and New Jersey's second round choice (Leif Rohlin) in the 1988 NHL entry draft. Sundström would play another five seasons with the Devils.

On April 22, 1988, Sundström set a Stanley Cup playoffs record (since tied by Mario Lemieux) by recording eight points (three goals and five assists) in New Jersey's 10-4 victory over the Washington Capitals in Game 3 of the Patrick Division Final. This broke the previous record of seven points, recorded on three occasions by Wayne Gretzky while with the Edmonton Oilers.

After leaving the NHL in 1992, he returned to Sweden to play the 1992-1993 season for Björklöven and was a contributing factor to them being promoted back to the Swedish Elite League (SEL) in 1993.

Sundström scored a total of 588 points (219 goals, 369 assists) in 679 regular season NHL games and 86 points (41 goals, 45 assists) in 115 games in the SEL.

Sundström represented Sweden at the 1980 and 1982 World Junior Ice Hockey Championships. He also represented Sweden in 31 official "caps" including the 1981, 1982 World Ice Hockey Championships, the 1981 and the 1984 Canada Cups.

At present, he works with youth ice hockey in Umeå.

He is the father of former New Jersey Devils prospect Alexander Sundström, and twin brother of Peter Sundström who also played in the NHL. His father, Elon Sundström, and uncle, Kjell Sundström, both played ice hockey at the highest level in Sweden.

== Career statistics ==
=== Regular season and playoffs ===
			Regular season					Playoffs
Season	Team	League	GP	G	A	Pts	PIM	GP	G	A	Pts	PIM
1978–79	IF Björklöven	SEL	1	0	0	0	0	—	—	—	—	—
1979–80	IF Björklöven	SEL	26	5	7	12	20	3	1	0	1	4
1980–81	IF Björklöven	SEL	36	10	18	28	30	—	—	—	—	—
1981–82	IF Björklöven	SEL	36	22	13	35	38	7	3	4	7	6
1982–83	Vancouver Canucks	NHL	74	23	23	46	30	4	0	0	0	2
1983–84	Vancouver Canucks	NHL	78	38	53	91	37	4	0	1	1	7
1984–85	Vancouver Canucks	NHL	71	25	43	68	46	—	—	—	—	—
1985–86	Vancouver Canucks	NHL	79	18	48	66	28	3	1	0	1	0
1986–87	Vancouver Canucks	NHL	72	29	42	71	40	—	—	—	—	—
1987–88	New Jersey Devils	NHL	78	15	36	51	42	18	7	13	20	14
1988–89	New Jersey Devils	NHL	65	28	41	69	36	—	—	—	—	—
1989–90	New Jersey Devils	NHL	74	27	49	76	34	6	1	3	4	2
1990–91	New Jersey Devils	NHL	71	15	31	46	48	2	0	0	0	0
1991–92	New Jersey Devils	NHL	17	1	3	4	8	—	—	—	—	—
1991–92	Utica Devils	AHL	1	0	0	0	0	—	—	—	—	—
1992–93	IF Björklöven	SWE II	36	16	21	37	46	9	3	5	8	10
1993–94	IF Björklöven	SEL	16	4	7	11	14	—	—	—	—	—
NHL totals			679	219	369	588	349	37	9	17	26	25
SEL totals			115	41	45	86	102	10	4	4	8	10

=== International ===
Year	Team	Event	GP	G	A	Pts	PIM
1980	Sweden	WJC	5	0	1	1	4
1981	Sweden	WJC	5	7	0	7	8
1981	Sweden	WC	7	4	0	4	2
1981	Sweden	CC	5	0	2	2	4
1982	Sweden	WC	10	5	2	7	8
1984	Sweden	CC	8	1	6	7	6
Junior totals			10	7	1	8	12
Senior totals			30	10	10	20	20

== Awards ==
International

- Gold medal – 1981 World Junior Ice Hockey Championships
- Silver medal – 1981 Ice Hockey World Championships
- Silver medal – 1984 Canada Cup
- Bronze medal – 1980 World Junior Ice Hockey Championships
- Best forward – 1981 World Junior Ice Hockey Championships

Sweden

- Golden Puck – 1981–82
- Viking Award – 1983–84, 1988–89

== Records ==
- NHL record for points in a playoff game – 8 (April 22, 1988; the record was tied by Mario Lemieux on April 25, 1989)
- Vancouver Canucks franchise record for points in a regular season game – 7 (February 29, 1984)
- Vancouver Canucks franchise record for assists in a regular season game – 6 (February 29, 1984)

Awards
Preceded by Peter Lindmark	Guldpucken; 1982	Succeeded by Håkan Loob
