= Patrick Division =

Former National Hockey League division

- Conference: Campbell Conference (1974–1981); Wales Conference (1981–1993)
- League: National Hockey League
- Sport: Ice hockey
- Founded: 1974
- Folded: 1993
- Replaced by: 1993–2013 Atlantic Division
- Most titles: Philadelphia Flyers (8)

The National Hockey League's Patrick Division was formed in 1974 as part of the Clarence Campbell Conference. The division moved to the Prince of Wales Conference in 1981. The division existed for 19 seasons until 1993. It was named after Lester Patrick, player and longtime coach of the New York Rangers, who was a developer of ice hockey. It is the forerunner of the original Atlantic Division, which later became the Metropolitan Division in 2013.

== Division lineups ==
=== 1974–1979 ===
1974–79 Patrick Division Teams
- Atlanta Flames
- New York Islanders
- New York Rangers
- Philadelphia Flyers

==== Changes from the 1973–74 season ====
- The Patrick Division is formed as a result of NHL realignment
- The New York Islanders and New York Rangers come from the East Division
- The Atlanta Flames and Philadelphia Flyers come from the West Division

=== 1979–1980 ===
1979–80 Patrick Division Teams
- Atlanta Flames
- New York Islanders
- New York Rangers
- Philadelphia Flyers
- Washington Capitals

==== Changes from the 1978–79 season ====
- The Washington Capitals come from the Norris Division

=== 1980–1981 ===
1980–81 Patrick Division Teams
- Calgary Flames
- New York Islanders
- New York Rangers
- Philadelphia Flyers
- Washington Capitals

==== Changes from the 1979–80 season ====
- The Atlanta Flames move to Calgary, Alberta, to become the Calgary Flames

=== 1981–1982 ===
1981–82 Patrick Division Teams
- New York Islanders
- New York Rangers
- Philadelphia Flyers
- Pittsburgh Penguins
- Washington Capitals

==== Changes from the 1980–81 season ====
- The Patrick Division switches from the Clarence Campbell Conference to the Prince of Wales Conference
- The Calgary Flames move to the Smythe Division
- The Pittsburgh Penguins come from the Norris Division

=== 1982–1993 ===
1982–93 Patrick Division Teams
- New Jersey Devils
- New York Islanders
- New York Rangers
- Philadelphia Flyers
- Pittsburgh Penguins
- Washington Capitals

==== Changes from the 1981–82 season ====
- The Colorado Rockies move to East Rutherford, New Jersey, to become the New Jersey Devils
- The New Jersey Devils come from the Smythe Division

=== After the 1992–93 season ===
The league was reformatted into two conferences with two divisions each:

- Eastern Conference
  - Atlantic Division
  - Northeast Division
- Western Conference
  - Central Division
  - Pacific Division

== Season results ==
^{(#)}	Denotes team that won the Stanley Cup
^{(#)}	Denotes team that lost Stanley Cup Final (and since 1981–82 won the Prince of Wales Trophy)
^{(#)}	Denotes team that qualified for the Stanley Cup playoffs
‡	Denotes team with most points in the regular season (winner of the Presidents' Trophy since 1985–86)

Season	1st	2nd	3rd	4th	5th	6th
1974–75	^{(DC)} Philadelphia (113)^{‡}	^{(4)} NY Rangers (88)	^{(5)} NY Islanders (88)	Atlanta (83)		
1975–76	^{(DC)} Philadelphia (118)	^{(2)} NY Islanders (101)	^{(6)} Atlanta (82)	NY Rangers (67)		
1976–77	^{(DC)} Philadelphia (112)	^{(1)} NY Islanders (106)	^{(6)} Atlanta (80)	NY Rangers (72)		
1977–78	^{(DC)} NY Islanders (111)	^{(1)} Philadelphia (105)	^{(4)} Atlanta (87)	^{(7)} NY Rangers (73)		
1978–79	^{(DC)} NY Islanders (116)^{‡}	^{(1)} Philadelphia (95)	^{(2)} NY Rangers (91)	^{(3)} Atlanta (90)		
1979–80	^{(1)} Philadelphia (116)^{‡}	^{(5)} NY Islanders (91)	^{(8)} NY Rangers (86)	^{(9)} Atlanta (83)	Washington (67)	
1980–81	^{(1)} NY Islanders (110)^{‡}	^{(6)} Philadelphia (97)	^{(7)} Calgary (92)	^{(13)} NY Rangers (74)	Washington (70)	
1981–82	NY Islanders (118)^{‡}	NY Rangers (92)	Philadelphia (87)	Pittsburgh (75)	Washington (65)	
1982–83	Philadelphia (106)	NY Islanders (96)	Washington (94)	NY Rangers (80)	New Jersey (48)	Pittsburgh (45)
1983–84	NY Islanders (104)	Washington (101)	Philadelphia (98)	NY Rangers (93)	New Jersey (41)	Pittsburgh (38)
1984–85	Philadelphia (113)^{‡}	Washington (101)	NY Islanders (86)	NY Rangers (62)	New Jersey (54)	Pittsburgh (53)
1985–86	Philadelphia (110)	Washington (107)	NY Islanders (90)	NY Rangers (78)	Pittsburgh (76)	New Jersey (59)
1986–87	Philadelphia (100)	Washington (86)	NY Islanders (82)	NY Rangers (76)	Pittsburgh (72)	New Jersey (64)
1987–88	NY Islanders (88)	Philadelphia (85)	Washington (85)	New Jersey (82)	NY Rangers (82)	Pittsburgh (81)
1988–89	Washington (92)	Pittsburgh (87)	NY Rangers (82)	Philadelphia (80)	New Jersey (66)	NY Islanders (61)
1989–90	NY Rangers (85)	New Jersey (83)	Washington (78)	NY Islanders (73)	Pittsburgh (72)	Philadelphia (71)
1990–91	Pittsburgh (88)	NY Rangers (85)	Washington (81)	New Jersey (79)	Philadelphia (76)	NY Islanders (60)
1991–92	NY Rangers (105)^{‡}	Washington (98)	Pittsburgh (87)	New Jersey (87)	NY Islanders (79)	Philadelphia (75)
1992–93	Pittsburgh (119)^{‡}	Washington (93)	NY Islanders (87)	New Jersey (87)	Philadelphia (83)	NY Rangers (79)

== Patrick Division titles won by team ==
Team	Wins	Last win
Philadelphia Flyers	8	1987
New York Islanders	6	1988
New York Rangers	2	1992
Pittsburgh Penguins	2	1993
Washington Capitals	1	1989
Atlanta/Calgary Flames	0	—
New Jersey Devils	0	—
