= 1987–88 Quebec Nordiques season =

National Hockey League team season

1987–88 Quebec Nordiques
- Division: 5th Adams
- Conference: 11th Wales
- 1987–88 record: 32–43–5
- Home record: 15–23–2
- Road record: 17–20–3
- Goals for: 271
- Goals against: 306

Team information
- General manager: Maurice Filion
- Coach: Andre Savard; Ron Lapointe
- Captain: Peter Stastny
- Arena: Colisée de Québec

Team leaders
- Goals: Michel Goulet (48)
- Assists: Peter Stastny (65)
- Points: Peter Stastny (111)
- Penalty minutes: Gord Donnelly (301)
- Plus/minus: Gaetan Duchesne (+8)
- Wins: Mario Gosselin (20)
- Goals against average: Mario Brunetta (3.72)

The 1987–88 Quebec Nordiques season was the Nordiques ninth season in the National Hockey League (NHL).

== Offseason ==
Quebec made a huge trade during the 1987 NHL entry draft, as the Nordiques traded away Dale Hunter and Clint Malarchuk to the Washington Capitals for Gaetan Duchesne, Alan Haworth, and the Capitals first round draft pick in the 1987 NHL Entry Draft, in which the Nordiques selected Joe Sakic. Haworth had an injury plagued season in 1986–87, appearing in only 50 games, however, he scored 25 goals and 41 points. In 1985–86, Haworth had a career high 34 goals and 73 points for the Capitals. Duchesne had a career high 52 points with Washington in 1986–87, as he scored 17 goals and had 35 assists. Joe Sakic was the Nordiques second selection in the 1987 NHL entry draft, as he scored 60 goals and 133 points in 72 games with the Swift Current Broncos of the Western Hockey League (WHL), as Quebec selected Bryan Fogarty with their first pick. Fogarty had 70 points in 56 games with the Kingston Canadians of the Ontario Hockey League (OHL).

Head coach Michel Bergeron left the Nordiques to take the head coaching job with the New York Rangers. As compensation, the Nordiques received the New York Rangers first round pick in the 1988 NHL entry draft. Quebec hired former Nordiques player Andre Savard to replace Bergeron. Savard ended his twelve-year playing career by playing his last two seasons with Quebec from 1983 to 1985. He had been the head coach of the Fredericton Express of the AHL.

Late in the pre-season, the Nordiques made a trade with the New York Rangers, when Quebec sent David Shaw and John Ogrodnick to the Rangers for Terry Carkner and Jeff Jackson. Carkner had a solid rookie season with New York in 1986–87, scoring two goals and 15 points in 52 games with the Rangers, while Jackson split the season between the Toronto Maple Leafs and the Rangers, scoring 13 goals and 21 points in 64 games between the two teams.

== Regular season ==
Quebec began the season with a three-game winning streak, and continued their early season success, as they had a 9–5–1 record through their first 15 games. The Nordiques then lost eight of their next nine games, to fall to 10–13–1--a slump which cost head coach Andre Savard his job. He was replaced by assistant coach Ron Lapointe on an interim basis for the remainder of the season. Under Lapointe, the Nordiques would go 6–3–1 in his first ten games to reach the .500 level with a 16–16–2 record, and found themselves in a fight with the Buffalo Sabres and Hartford Whalers for the final two playoff spots in the Adams Division. Quebec would remain in the hunt, as after 72 games, the team had a 32–36–4 record, good for 68 points, and a three-point lead on the Whalers for the final playoff spot. Quebec then went winless in their last eight games, going 0–7–1, as the Nordiques sank to last place in the Adams Division, missing the playoffs for the first time since 1980. Their record was 32–43–5, earning 69 points, which was their worst record since 1979–80, when the Nordiques were 25–44–11, getting 61 points.

On offence, the club was led by Peter Stastny, who recorded 111 points, which was good for a tie for fifth place in the National Hockey League (NHL). Stastny scored 46 goals, his highest total since 1983–84, while adding 65 assists. Michel Goulet once again led the club in goals, as he scored 48 times, while he added 58 assists for 106 points. Anton Stastny was solid once again, getting 27 goals and 72 points, while newcomers Gaetan Duchesne and Alan Haworth each cracked the 20 goal plateau, scoring 24 and 23 goals respectively.

Jeff Brown led the Nordiques from the blueline, scoring 16 goals and 52 points, while Terry Carkner chipped in with 27 points in his first season in Quebec.

In goal, Mario Gosselin appeared in 54 games, winning a team high 20 games, while posting a 3.78 GAA, and recording two shutouts for the team. Rookie Mario Brunetta was the backup, winning 10 games with a 3.72 GAA in 29 games. Another rookie, Ron Tugnutt, appeared in six games, earning two wins with a 3.38 GAA.

=== Final standings ===
Adams Division
	GP	W	L	T	GF	GA	Pts
**Montreal Canadiens**	80	45	22	13	298	238	103
**Boston Bruins**	80	44	30	6	300	251	94
**Buffalo Sabres**	80	37	32	11	283	305	85
**Hartford Whalers**	80	35	38	7	249	267	77
Quebec Nordiques	80	32	43	5	271	306	69

Note: GP = Games played, W = Wins, L = Losses, T = Ties, Pts = Points, GF = Goals for, GA = Goals against
Note: Teams that qualified for the playoffs are highlighted in bold.

=== Record vs. opponents ===
Adams Division record vs. opponents

==== Vs. Wales Conference ====
**Vs. Adams Division**

1987–88 NHL records
Team	**BOS**	**BUF**	**HFD**	**MTL**	**QUE**	**Total**
Boston	—	4–3–1	4–3–1	3–4–1	5–3	**16–13–3**
Buffalo	3–4–1	—	3–4–1	3–3–2	5–2–1	**14–13–5**
Hartford	3–4–1	4–3–1	—	2–4–2	2–6	**11–17–4**
Montreal	4–3–1	3–3–2	4–2−2	—	6–2	**17–10–5**
Quebec	3–5	2–5–1	6–2	2–6	—	**13–18–1**

**Vs. Patrick Division**

1987–88 NHL records
Team	**NJD**	**NYI**	**NYR**	**PHI**	**PIT**	**WSH**	**Total**
Boston	2–1	1–2	1–2	1–2	2–0–1	1–2	**8–9–1**
Buffalo	2–0–1	1–2	3–0	0–3	0–2–1	2–0–1	**8–7–3**
Hartford	1–1–1	1–2	1–2	1–2	1–2	1–2	**6–11–1**
Montreal	1–2	3–0	1–1–1	1–0–2	1–2	1–1–1	**8–6–4**
Quebec	3–0	1–2	1–2	0–2–1	0–3	1–2	**6–11–1**

==== Vs. Campbell Conference ====
**Vs. Norris Division**

1987–88 NHL records
Team	**CHI**	**DET**	**MIN**	**STL**	**TOR**	**Total**
Boston	3–0	1–2	3–0	1–2	2–1	**10–5–0**
Buffalo	2–1	1–2	1–1–1	3–0	3–0	**10–4–1**
Hartford	2–1	2–1	3–0	1–2	3–0	**11–4–0**
Montreal	2–0–1	2–1	1–1–1	2–1	3–0	**10–3–2**
Quebec	2–0–1	3–0	2–1	1–2	3–0	**11–3–1**

**Vs. Smythe Division**

1987–88 NHL records
Team	**CGY**	**EDM**	**LAK**	**VAN**	**WIN**	**Total**
Boston	2–1	1–1–1	2–0–1	2–1	3–0	**10–3–2**
Buffalo	1–2	0–3	2–1	1–1–1	1–1–1	**5–8–2**
Hartford	0–3	1–2	3–0	1–0–2	2–1	**7–6–2**
Montreal	0–2–1	3–0	2–1	2–0–1	3–0	**10–3–2**
Quebec	0–3	1–1–1	1–2	0–3	0–2–1	**2–11–2**

== Schedule and results ==
1987–88 regular season
October

Game	Result	Date	Score	Opponent	Record
1	W	October 8, 1987	5–1	@ Hartford Whalers (1987–88)	1–0–0
2	W	October 10, 1987	6–5 OT	Boston Bruins (1987–88)	2–0–0
3	W	October 12, 1987	5–2	@ Montreal Canadiens (1987–88)	3–0–0
4	T	October 16, 1987	2–2 OT	@ Buffalo Sabres (1987–88)	3–0–1
5	L	October 17, 1987	3–6	Buffalo Sabres (1987–88)	3–1–1
6	L	October 22, 1987	3–5	Minnesota North Stars (1987–88)	3–2–1
7	L	October 24, 1987	5–7	Calgary Flames (1987–88)	3–3–1
8	W	October 27, 1987	5–0	Edmonton Oilers (1987–88)	4–3–1
9	W	October 29, 1987	4–2	@ Boston Bruins (1987–88)	5–3–1
10	L	October 31, 1987	4–5 OT	Pittsburgh Penguins (1987–88)	5–4–1

November

Game	Result	Date	Score	Opponent	Record
11	L	November 1, 1987	1–5	Hartford Whalers (1987–88)	5–5–1
12	W	November 3, 1987	4–3	St. Louis Blues (1987–88)	6–5–1
13	W	November 6, 1987	4–1	@ Washington Capitals (1987–88)	7–5–1
14	W	November 7, 1987	5–3	@ Hartford Whalers (1987–88)	8–5–1
15	W	November 9, 1987	6–4	Boston Bruins (1987–88)	9–5–1
16	L	November 13, 1987	4–6	@ Vancouver Canucks (1987–88)	9–6–1
17	L	November 14, 1987	7–8	@ Los Angeles Kings (1987–88)	9–7–1
18	L	November 18, 1987	1–4	@ Edmonton Oilers (1987–88)	9–8–1
19	L	November 19, 1987	1–9	@ Calgary Flames (1987–88)	9–9–1
20	W	November 23, 1987	4–3 OT	Montreal Canadiens (1987–88)	10–9–1
21	L	November 25, 1987	4–6	@ Pittsburgh Penguins (1987–88)	10–10–1
22	L	November 28, 1987	3–6	Philadelphia Flyers (1987–88)	10–11–1

December

Game	Result	Date	Score	Opponent	Record
23	L	December 1, 1987	1–3	Vancouver Canucks (1987–88)	10–12–1
24	L	December 3, 1987	3–6	@ Buffalo Sabres (1987–88)	10–13–1
25	W	December 5, 1987	3–2	New Jersey Devils (1987–88)	11–13–1
26	L	December 8, 1987	4–5	Hartford Whalers (1987–88)	11–14–1
27	T	December 11, 1987	3–3 OT	@ Winnipeg Jets (1987–88)	11–14–2
28	W	December 12, 1987	5–0	@ Minnesota North Stars (1987–88)	12–14–2
29	L	December 16, 1987	4–5	@ Montreal Canadiens (1987–88)	12–15–2
30	W	December 20, 1987	4–2	Detroit Red Wings (1987–88)	13–15–2
31	L	December 22, 1987	1–2	Washington Capitals (1987–88)	13–16–2
32	W	December 26, 1987	4–2	@ Hartford Whalers (1987–88)	14–16–2
33	W	December 27, 1987	5–3	Hartford Whalers (1987–88)	15–16–2
34	W	December 29, 1987	5–1	Buffalo Sabres (1987–88)	16–16–2
35	L	December 31, 1987	1–6	@ New York Rangers (1987–88)	16–17–2

January

Game	Result	Date	Score	Opponent	Record
36	L	January 2, 1988	1–5	@ Boston Bruins (1987–88)	16–18–2
37	L	January 3, 1988	1–2	@ Buffalo Sabres (1987–88)	16–19–2
38	W	January 6, 1988	6–1	@ Chicago Blackhawks (1987–88)	17–19–2
39	L	January 9, 1988	2–3	Vancouver Canucks (1987–88)	17–20–2
40	W	January 13, 1988	5–3	@ New Jersey Devils (1987–88)	18–20–2
41	L	January 14, 1988	5–8	@ New York Islanders (1987–88)	18–21–2
42	W	January 16, 1988	4–1	Chicago Blackhawks (1987–88)	19–21–2
43	T	January 19, 1988	4–4 OT	Edmonton Oilers (1987–88)	19–21–3
44	W	January 21, 1988	5–4	@ Toronto Maple Leafs (1987–88)	20–21–3
45	L	January 23, 1988	3–5	St. Louis Blues (1987–88)	20–22–3
46	L	January 24, 1988	3–5	Montreal Canadiens (1987–88)	20–23–3
47	W	January 26, 1988	5–3	Los Angeles Kings (1987–88)	21–23–3
48	L	January 28, 1988	0–3	@ Boston Bruins (1987–88)	21–24–3
49	L	January 30, 1988	2–5	@ St. Louis Blues (1987–88)	21–25–3

February

Game	Result	Date	Score	Opponent	Record
50	L	February 2, 1988	3–6	Buffalo Sabres (1987–88)	21–26–3
51	W	February 4, 1988	3–2	New York Rangers (1987–88)	22–26–3
52	L	February 6, 1988	2–3	Boston Bruins (1987–88)	22–27–3
53	T	February 7, 1988	5–5 OT	Chicago Blackhawks (1987–88)	22–27–4
54	L	February 11, 1988	3–5	@ Los Angeles Kings (1987–88)	22–28–4
55	W	February 13, 1988	7–3	@ Minnesota North Stars (1987–88)	23–28–4
56	L	February 14, 1988	2–3	@ Winnipeg Jets (1987–88)	23–29–4
57	L	February 16, 1988	3–7	Winnipeg Jets (1987–88)	23–30–4
58	L	February 20, 1988	3–5	@ Montreal Canadiens (1987–88)	23–31–4
59	W	February 21, 1988	6–5	@ Buffalo Sabres (1987–88)	24–31–4
60	L	February 23, 1988	1–3	Montreal Canadiens (1987–88)	24–32–4
61	W	February 26, 1988	3–2	@ Detroit Red Wings (1987–88)	25–32–4
62	W	February 27, 1988	5–4	Detroit Red Wings (1987–88)	26–32–4
63	L	February 29, 1988	1–2	Montreal Canadiens (1987–88)	26–33–4

March

Game	Result	Date	Score	Opponent	Record
64	W	March 2, 1988	4–3	@ Toronto Maple Leafs (1987–88)	27–33–4
65	L	March 4, 1988	2–6	@ Washington Capitals (1987–88)	27–34–4
66	L	March 6, 1988	0–2	New York Islanders (1987–88)	27–35–4
67	W	March 8, 1988	6–4	Hartford Whalers (1987–88)	28–35–4
68	W	March 10, 1988	4–3	@ New York Islanders (1987–88)	29–35–4
69	L	March 12, 1988	3–4	Boston Bruins (1987–88)	29–36–4
70	W	March 13, 1988	4–1	@ Hartford Whalers (1987–88)	30–36–4
71	W	March 15, 1988	3–2	Toronto Maple Leafs (1987–88)	31–36–4
72	W	March 17, 1988	4–3	@ New Jersey Devils (1987–88)	32–36–4
73	L	March 19, 1988	4–5 OT	Calgary Flames (1987–88)	32–37–4
74	L	March 23, 1988	1–4	@ Montreal Canadiens (1987–88)	32–38–4
75	L	March 26, 1988	2–6	@ Boston Bruins (1987–88)	32–39–4
76	L	March 27, 1988	3–6	Pittsburgh Penguins (1987–88)	32–40–4
77	L	March 29, 1988	1–3	Buffalo Sabres (1987–88)	32–41–4
78	T	March 31, 1988	4–4 OT	@ Philadelphia Flyers (1987–88)	32–41–5

April

Game	Result	Date	Score	Opponent	Record
79	L	April 2, 1988	4–7	Philadelphia Flyers (1987–88)	32–42–5
80	L	April 3, 1988	0–3	@ New York Rangers (1987–88)	32–43–5

Legend: Win (2 points) Loss (0 points) Tie (1 point)

== Player statistics ==
Regular season
Scoring

Player	Pos	GP	G	A	Pts	PIM	+/-	PPG	SHG	GWG
Peter Stastny	C	76	46	65	111	69	2	20	0	2
Michel Goulet	LW	80	48	58	106	56	-31	29	1	4
Anton Stastny	LW	69	27	45	72	14	-9	15	0	4
Alan Haworth	C	72	23	34	57	112	-5	6	0	2
Jeff Brown	D	78	16	36	52	64	-25	9	0	4
Gaetan Duchesne	LW	80	24	23	47	83	8	4	1	2
Lane Lambert	RW	61	13	28	41	98	0	0	0	2
Jason Lafreniere	C	40	10	19	29	4	-1	5	0	1
Jeff Jackson	LW	68	9	18	27	103	5	0	2	3
Terry Carkner	D	63	3	24	27	159	-8	2	0	1
Tommy Albelin	D	60	3	23	26	47	-7	0	0	0
Randy Moller	D	66	3	22	25	169	-11	0	0	2
Alain Cote	LW	76	4	18	22	26	3	0	0	0
Mike Eagles	C/LW	76	10	10	20	74	-18	1	2	2
Paul Gillis	C	80	7	10	17	164	-29	1	0	0
Robert Picard	D	65	3	13	16	103	-1	0	1	1
Marc Fortier	C	27	4	10	14	12	-17	3	0	1
Normand Rochefort	D	46	3	10	13	49	-2	0	1	0
Steven Finn	D	75	3	7	10	198	-4	1	0	0
Gord Donnelly	D	63	4	3	7	301	-16	1	0	0
Mike Hough	LW	17	3	2	5	2	-8	0	0	1
Ken Quinney	RW	15	2	2	4	5	-3	1	0	0
Jean-Marc Richard	D	4	2	1	3	2	-3	1	0	0
Stu Kulak	RW	14	1	1	2	28	-5	0	0	0
Trevor Stienburg	RW	8	0	1	1	24	-1	0	0	0
Ron Tugnutt	G	6	0	1	1	0	0	0	0	0
Mario Brunetta	G	29	0	0	0	16	0	0	0	0
Bobby Dollas	D	9	0	0	0	2	-4	0	0	0
Mario Gosselin	G	54	0	0	0	8	0	0	0	0
Stephane Guerard	D	30	0	0	0	34	-7	0	0	0
David Latta	LW	10	0	0	0	0	-4	0	0	0
Ken McRae	C	1	0	0	0	0	0	0	0	0
Max Middendorf	RW	1	0	0	0	0	0	0	0	0
Mike Natyshak	RW	4	0	0	0	0	-1	0	0	0
Daniel Poudrier	D	6	0	0	0	0	-1	0	0	0

Goaltending

Player	MIN	GP	W	L	T	GA	GAA	SO	SA	SV	SV%
Mario Gosselin	3002	54	20	28	4	189	3.78	2	1422	1233	.867
Mario Brunetta	1550	29	10	12	1	96	3.72	0	778	682	.877
Ron Tugnutt	284	6	2	3	0	16	3.38	0	123	107	.870
Team:	4836	80	32	43	5	301	3.73	2	2323	2022	.870

Note:

Pos = Position;GP = Games played; G = Goals; A = Assists; Pts = Points; PIM = Penalty minutes; +/- = Plus/minus; PPG = Power-play goals; SHG = Short-handed goals; GWG = Game-winning goals
Pos = Position;GP = Games played; Min, TOI = Minutes played; W = Wins; L = Losses; T,T/OT = Ties; OTL = Overtime losses; GA = Goals-against; GAA = Goals-against average; SO = Shutouts; SA = Shots against; SV = Shots saved;SV% = Save percentage;

== Awards ==
- Second NHL All-Star team: Michel Goulet

== Transactions ==
The Nordiques were involved in the following transactions during the 1987–88 season.

=== Trades ===
September 30, 1987	To New York Rangers John Ogrodnick; David Shaw	To Quebec Nordiques Terry Carkner; Jeff Jackson
December 17, 1987	To Winnipeg Jets Stu Kulak	To Quebec Nordiques Bobby Dollas
May 18, 1988	To New York Rangers Head Coach Michel Bergeron	To Quebec Nordiques 1st round pick in 1988 – Daniel Dore

=== Waivers ===
October 5, 1987	To Minnesota North Stars Richard Zemlak
October 5, 1987	To New Jersey Devils Risto Siltanen
October 5, 1987	From New York Rangers Stu Kulak

=== Free agents ===
Player	New Team
Jimmy Mann	Pittsburgh Penguins
Basil McRae	Minnesota North Stars

== Draft picks ==
Quebec's draft picks from the 1987 NHL entry draft which was held at Joe Louis Arena in Detroit, Michigan.

Round	#	Player	Nationality	College/junior/club team (league)
1	9	Bryan Fogarty	Canada	Kingston Canadians (OHL)
1	15	Joe Sakic	Canada	Swift Current Broncos (WHL)
3	51	Jim Sprott	Canada	London Knights (OHL)
4	72	Kip Miller	United States	Michigan State Spartans (NCAA)
5	93	Rob Mendel	United States	Wisconsin Badgers (NCAA)
6	114	Garth Snow	United States	Mount St. Charles Academy (USHS)
7	135	Tim Hanus	United States	Minnetonka High School (USHS)
8	156	Jake Enebak	United States	Northfield High School (USHS)
9	177	Jaroslav Sevcik	Czechoslovakia	ZKL Brno (Czech.)
9	183	Ladislav Tresl	Czechoslovakia	ZKL Brno (Czech.)
10	198	Darren Nauss	Canada	North Battleford North Stars (SJHL)
11	219	Mike Williams	United States	Ferris State Bulldogs (NCAA)
S2	11	Mike Hiltner	United States	University of Alaska Anchorage (WCHA)

== Farm teams ==
- Fredericton Express – AHL

== See also ==
- 1987–88 NHL season
