= 1987–88 Boston Bruins season =

NHL team season

1987–88 Boston Bruins
- Wales Conference champions
- Division: 2nd Adams
- Conference: 2nd Wales
- 1987–88 record: 44–30–6
- Home record: 24–13–3
- Road record: 20–17–3
- Goals for: 300
- Goals against: 251

Team information
- General manager: Harry Sinden
- Coach: Terry O'Reilly
- Captain: Ray Bourque; Rick Middleton
- Alternate captains: Keith Crowder
- Arena: Boston Garden

Team leaders
- Goals: Cam Neely (42)
- Assists: Ray Bourque (64)
- Points: Ray Bourque (81)
- Penalty minutes: Jay Miller (304)
- Wins: Rejean Lemelin (24)
- Goals against average: Andy Moog (2.83)

The 1987–88 Boston Bruins season was the Bruins' 64th season. The season involved participating in the 1988 Stanley Cup Finals.

== Off-season ==
=== NHL draft ===
Boston's draft picks at the 1987 NHL entry draft held at the Joe Louis Arena in Detroit.

Round	#	Player	Nationality	College/junior/club team (league)
1	3	Glen Wesley	Canada	Portland Winter Hawks (WHL)
1	14	Stephane Quintal	Canada	Granby Bisons (QMJHL)
3	56	Todd Lalonde	Canada	Sudbury Wolves (OHL)
4	67	Darwin McPherson	Canada	New Westminster Bruins (WHL)
4	77	Matt DelGuidice	United States	Saint Anselm College (ECAC East)
5	98	Ted Donato	United States	Catholic Memorial School (USHS-MA)
6	119	Matt Glennon	United States	Archbishop Williams High School (USHS-MA)
7	140	Rob Cheevers	United States	Boston College (Hockey East)
8	161	Chris Winnes	United States	Northwood School (USHS-NY)
9	182	Paul Ohman	United States	St. John's School (USHS-MA)
10	203	Casey Jones	United States	Cornell University (ECAC)
11	224	Eric LeMarque	United States	Northern Michigan University (WCHA)
12	245	Sean Gorman	United States	Matignon High School (USHS-MA)
S2	15	Mike Jeffrey	Canada	Northern Michigan University (WCHA)

== Regular season ==
The season will forever be remembered when on the night Phil Esposito's number 7 would retire, captain Ray Bourque went from wearing uniform number 7 to wearing uniform number 77. Bourque would wear that number until the end of his career. This occurred on December 3, 1987. As for the game, the Bruins beat the New York Rangers 4–3, in which Esposito was the General Manager.

=== Final standings ===
Adams Division
	GP	W	L	T	GF	GA	Pts
**Montreal Canadiens**	80	45	22	13	298	238	103
**Boston Bruins**	80	44	30	6	300	251	94
**Buffalo Sabres**	80	37	32	11	283	305	85
**Hartford Whalers**	80	35	38	7	249	267	77
Quebec Nordiques	80	32	43	5	271	306	69

Note: GP = Games played, W = Wins, L = Losses, T = Ties, Pts = Points, GF = Goals for, GA = Goals against
Note: Teams that qualified for the playoffs are highlighted in bold.

=== Record vs. opponents ===
Adams Division record vs. opponents

==== Vs. Wales Conference ====
**Vs. Adams Division**

1987–88 NHL records
Team	**BOS**	**BUF**	**HFD**	**MTL**	**QUE**	**Total**
Boston	—	4–3–1	4–3–1	3–4–1	5–3	**16–13–3**
Buffalo	3–4–1	—	3–4–1	3–3–2	5–2–1	**14–13–5**
Hartford	3–4–1	4–3–1	—	2–4–2	2–6	**11–17–4**
Montreal	4–3–1	3–3–2	4–2−2	—	6–2	**17–10–5**
Quebec	3–5	2–5–1	6–2	2–6	—	**13–18–1**

**Vs. Patrick Division**

1987–88 NHL records
Team	**NJD**	**NYI**	**NYR**	**PHI**	**PIT**	**WSH**	**Total**
Boston	2–1	1–2	1–2	1–2	2–0–1	1–2	**8–9–1**
Buffalo	2–0–1	1–2	3–0	0–3	0–2–1	2–0–1	**8–7–3**
Hartford	1–1–1	1–2	1–2	1–2	1–2	1–2	**6–11–1**
Montreal	1–2	3–0	1–1–1	1–0–2	1–2	1–1–1	**8–6–4**
Quebec	3–0	1–2	1–2	0–2–1	0–3	1–2	**6–11–1**

==== Vs. Campbell Conference ====
**Vs. Norris Division**

1987–88 NHL records
Team	**CHI**	**DET**	**MIN**	**STL**	**TOR**	**Total**
Boston	3–0	1–2	3–0	1–2	2–1	**10–5–0**
Buffalo	2–1	1–2	1–1–1	3–0	3–0	**10–4–1**
Hartford	2–1	2–1	3–0	1–2	3–0	**11–4–0**
Montreal	2–0–1	2–1	1–1–1	2–1	3–0	**10–3–2**
Quebec	2–0–1	3–0	2–1	1–2	3–0	**11–3–1**

**Vs. Smythe Division**

1987–88 NHL records
Team	**CGY**	**EDM**	**LAK**	**VAN**	**WIN**	**Total**
Boston	2–1	1–1–1	2–0–1	2–1	3–0	**10–3–2**
Buffalo	1–2	0–3	2–1	1–1–1	1–1–1	**5–8–2**
Hartford	0–3	1–2	3–0	1–0–2	2–1	**7–6–2**
Montreal	0–2–1	3–0	2–1	2–0–1	3–0	**10–3–2**
Quebec	0–3	1–1–1	1–2	0–3	0–2–1	**2–11–2**

== Schedule and results ==
1987–88 regular season
October

Game	Result	Date	Score	Opponent	Record
1	W	October 8, 1987	4–3	Washington Capitals (1987–88)	1–0–0
2	L	October 10, 1987	5–6 OT	@ Quebec Nordiques (1987–88)	1–1–0
3	W	October 11, 1987	5–2	Hartford Whalers (1987–88)	2–1–0
4	W	October 15, 1987	3–2	@ Los Angeles Kings (1987–88)	3–1–0
5	L	October 17, 1987	3–4	@ Edmonton Oilers (1987–88)	3–2–0
6	W	October 18, 1987	6–5 OT	@ Calgary Flames (1987–88)	4–2–0
7	W	October 21, 1987	5–4	@ Vancouver Canucks (1987–88)	5–2–0
8	L	October 24, 1987	0–4	@ St. Louis Blues (1987–88)	5–3–0
9	L	October 29, 1987	2–4	Quebec Nordiques (1987–88)	5–4–0
10	T	October 31, 1987	3–3 OT	@ Montreal Canadiens (1987–88)	5–4–1

November

Game	Result	Date	Score	Opponent	Record
11	L	November 1, 1987	5–6 OT	New York Islanders (1987–88)	5–5–1
12	T	November 4, 1987	2–2 OT	@ Hartford Whalers (1987–88)	5–5–2
13	L	November 5, 1987	6–7	Toronto Maple Leafs (1987–88)	5–6–2
14	W	November 7, 1987	4–1	Pittsburgh Penguins (1987–88)	6–6–2
15	L	November 9, 1987	4–6	@ Quebec Nordiques (1987–88)	6–7–2
16	W	November 11, 1987	3–2	@ Toronto Maple Leafs (1987–88)	7–7–2
17	W	November 12, 1987	3–2	Montreal Canadiens (1987–88)	8–7–2
18	W	November 14, 1987	4–1	Hartford Whalers (1987–88)	9–7–2
19	W	November 17, 1987	6–3	@ Calgary Flames (1987–88)	10–7–2
20	W	November 18, 1987	4–3	@ Winnipeg Jets (1987–88)	11–7–2
21	W	November 21, 1987	7–5	@ Minnesota North Stars (1987–88)	12–7–2
22	W	November 22, 1987	1–0	@ Detroit Red Wings (1987–88)	13–7–2
23	L	November 25, 1987	1–4	@ Washington Capitals (1987–88)	13–8–2
24	W	November 26, 1987	5–3	Winnipeg Jets (1987–88)	14–8–2
25	L	November 28, 1987	2–3 OT	Detroit Red Wings (1987–88)	14–9–2
26	L	November 30, 1987	4–6	@ Montreal Canadiens (1987–88)	14–10–2

December

Game	Result	Date	Score	Opponent	Record
27	W	December 2, 1987	5–3	@ Hartford Whalers (1987–88)	15–10–2
28	W	December 3, 1987	4–3	New York Rangers (1987–88)	16–10–2
29	W	December 5, 1987	7–3	Chicago Blackhawks (1987–88)	17–10–2
30	L	December 8, 1987	2–5	@ Philadelphia Flyers (1987–88)	17–11–2
31	W	December 10, 1987	4–3	Los Angeles Kings (1987–88)	18–11–2
32	T	December 12, 1987	3–3 OT	Buffalo Sabres (1987–88)	18–11–3
33	W	December 17, 1987	3–2 OT	Vancouver Canucks (1987–88)	19–11–3
34	L	December 19, 1987	5–7	St. Louis Blues (1987–88)	19–12–3
35	W	December 20, 1987	4–2	@ Chicago Blackhawks (1987–88)	20–12–3
36	W	December 22, 1987	9–0	Buffalo Sabres (1987–88)	21–12–3
37	L	December 26, 1987	1–2	@ New York Islanders (1987–88)	21–13–3
38	L	December 27, 1987	1–4	@ New York Rangers (1987–88)	21–14–3
39	T	December 29, 1987	4–4 OT	@ Pittsburgh Penguins (1987–88)	21–14–4
40	W	December 31, 1987	2–0	@ Buffalo Sabres (1987–88)	22–14–4

January

Game	Result	Date	Score	Opponent	Record
41	W	January 2, 1988	5–1	Quebec Nordiques (1987–88)	23–14–4
42	T	January 4, 1988	2–2 OT	Edmonton Oilers (1987–88)	23–14–5
43	W	January 7, 1988	3–2	@ Pittsburgh Penguins (1987–88)	24–14–5
44	W	January 9, 1988	2–1 OT	@ St. Louis Blues (1987–88)	25–14–5
45	L	January 11, 1988	3–4	Hartford Whalers (1987–88)	25–15–5
46	L	January 13, 1988	4–5	@ Montreal Canadiens (1987–88)	25–16–5
47	W	January 14, 1988	3–2	Montreal Canadiens (1987–88)	26–16–5
48	W	January 16, 1988	5–1	Buffalo Sabres (1987–88)	27–16–5
49	L	January 20, 1988	3–5	@ Buffalo Sabres (1987–88)	27–17–5
50	W	January 21, 1988	6–1	Minnesota North Stars (1987–88)	28–17–5
51	L	January 23, 1988	4–6	Philadelphia Flyers (1987–88)	28–18–5
52	W	January 28, 1988	3–0	Quebec Nordiques (1987–88)	29–18–5
53	L	January 30, 1988	2–4	New York Rangers (1987–88)	29–19–5

February

Game	Result	Date	Score	Opponent	Record
54	W	February 1, 1988	5–3	@ Chicago Blackhawks (1987–88)	30–19–5
55	W	February 4, 1988	7–3	Montreal Canadiens (1987–88)	31–19–5
56	W	February 6, 1988	3–2	@ Quebec Nordiques (1987–88)	32–19–5
57	W	February 7, 1988	6–3	New Jersey Devils (1987–88)	33–19–5
58	W	February 12, 1988	7–4	@ Edmonton Oilers (1987–88)	34–19–5
59	L	February 13, 1988	5–6	@ Vancouver Canucks (1987–88)	34–20–5
60	L	February 17, 1988	2–3	@ Montreal Canadiens (1987–88)	34–21–5
61	W	February 21, 1988	4–1	@ New Jersey Devils (1987–88)	35–21–5
62	L	February 23, 1988	2–3	@ Hartford Whalers (1987–88)	35–22–5
63	W	February 25, 1988	5–2	Hartford Whalers (1987–88)	36–22–5
64	W	February 27, 1988	7–4	Minnesota North Stars (1987–88)	37–22–5

March

Game	Result	Date	Score	Opponent	Record
65	W	March 3, 1988	5–3	Toronto Maple Leafs (1987–88)	38–22–5
66	L	March 5, 1988	6–7 OT	New Jersey Devils (1987–88)	38–23–5
67	L	March 6, 1988	0–3	@ Buffalo Sabres (1987–88)	38–24–5
68	L	March 8, 1988	0–2	@ Detroit Red Wings (1987–88)	38–25–5
69	T	March 10, 1988	3–3 OT	Los Angeles Kings (1987–88)	38–25–6
70	W	March 12, 1988	4–3	@ Quebec Nordiques (1987–88)	39–25–6
71	L	March 13, 1988	0–3	Washington Capitals (1987–88)	39–26–6
72	L	March 17, 1988	5–7	Calgary Flames (1987–88)	39–27–6
73	L	March 19, 1988	3–4	Buffalo Sabres (1987–88)	39–28–6
74	W	March 20, 1988	6–2	@ Buffalo Sabres (1987–88)	40–28–6
75	W	March 22, 1988	3–0	@ Philadelphia Flyers (1987–88)	41–28–6
76	W	March 24, 1988	4–3 OT	Winnipeg Jets (1987–88)	42–28–6
77	W	March 26, 1988	6–2	Quebec Nordiques (1987–88)	43–28–6
78	L	March 31, 1988	1–3	Montreal Canadiens (1987–88)	43–29–6

April

Game	Result	Date	Score	Opponent	Record
79	L	April 2, 1988	2–4	@ Hartford Whalers (1987–88)	43–30–6
80	W	April 3, 1988	3–2	New York Islanders (1987–88)	44–30–6

Legend: Win (2 points) Loss (0 points) Tie (1 point)

== Player statistics ==
=== Regular season ===
Scoring

Player	Pos	GP	G	A	Pts	PIM	+/-	PPG	SHG	GWG
Ray Bourque	D	78	17	64	81	72	34	7	1	5
Ken Linseman	C	77	29	45	74	167	36	7	0	5
Steve Kasper	C	79	26	44	70	35	-1	9	3	5
Cam Neely	RW	69	42	27	69	175	30	11	0	3
Geoff Courtnall	LW	62	32	26	58	108	24	8	0	4
Randy Burridge	LW	79	27	28	55	105	0	5	3	3
Bob Sweeney	C/RW	80	22	23	45	73	11	6	0	7
Keith Crowder	RW	68	17	26	43	173	14	6	0	3
Glen Wesley	D	79	7	30	37	69	21	1	2	0
Gord Kluzak	D	66	6	31	37	135	18	0	1	0
Reed Larson	D	62	10	24	34	93	3	5	1	1
Rick Middleton	RW	59	13	19	32	11	3	2	3	1
Michael Thelven	D	67	6	25	31	57	12	1	0	1
Lyndon Byers	RW	53	10	14	24	236	10	0	0	2
Jay Miller	LW	78	7	12	19	304	-5	0	0	1
Bill O'Dwyer	C	77	7	10	17	83	-3	1	0	1
Craig Janney	C	15	7	9	16	0	6	1	0	1
Nevin Markwart	LW	25	1	12	13	85	4	0	0	0
Bob Joyce	LW	15	7	5	12	10	4	2	0	0
Tom McCarthy	LW	7	2	5	7	6	3	1	0	0
Allen Pedersen	D	78	0	6	6	90	6	0	0	0
Willi Plett	RW	65	2	3	5	170	-10	1	0	0
Frank Simonetti	D	30	2	3	5	19	1	0	0	1
Tommy Lehman	C	9	1	3	4	6	0	0	0	0
Doug Keans	G	30	0	2	2	2	0	0	0	0
John Blum	D	19	0	1	1	70	-5	0	0	0
Wade Campbell	D	6	0	1	1	21	1	0	0	0
John Carter	LW	4	0	1	1	2	3	0	0	0
Bruce Shoebottom	D	3	0	1	1	0	-3	0	0	0
Mike Stevens	LW	7	0	1	1	9	0	0	0	0
Paul Beraldo	RW	3	0	0	0	0	-3	0	0	0
Alain Cote	D	2	0	0	0	0	-1	0	0	0
Taylor Hall	LW	7	0	0	0	4	-3	0	0	0
Greg Hawgood	D	1	0	0	0	0	-1	0	0	0
Moe Lemay	LW	2	0	0	0	0	-2	0	0	0
Rejean Lemelin	G	49	0	0	0	2	0	0	0	0
Alan May	RW	3	0	0	0	15	-1	0	0	0
Andy Moog	G	6	0	0	0	0	0	0	0	0
Kraig Nienhuis	LW	1	0	0	0	0	-1	0	0	0
Dave Reid	LW	3	0	0	0	0	0	0	0	0

Goaltending

Player	MIN	GP	W	L	T	GA	GAA	SO	SA	SV	SV%
Rejean Lemelin	2,828	49	24	17	6	138	2.93	3	1,244	1,106	.889
Doug Keans	1,660	30	16	11	0	90	3.25	1	751	661	.880
Andy Moog	360	6	4	2	0	17	2.83	1	181	164	.906
Team:	4,848	80	44	30	6	245	3.03	5	2,176	1,931	.887

=== Playoffs ===
Scoring

Player	Pos	GP	G	A	Pts	PIM	+/-	PPG	SHG	GWG
Ken Linseman	C	23	11	14	25	56	4	4	1	0
Ray Bourque	D	23	3	18	21	26	16	0	0	1
Cam Neely	RW	23	9	8	17	51	1	2	0	2
Craig Janney	C	23	6	10	16	11	-1	4	0	1
Bob Joyce	LW	23	8	6	14	18	-2	3	0	1
Bob Sweeney	C/RW	23	6	8	14	66	9	1	1	1
Glen Wesley	D	23	6	8	14	22	5	4	1	0
Steve Kasper	C	23	7	6	13	10	9	0	1	0
Gord Kluzak	D	23	4	8	12	59	6	0	1	1
Keith Crowder	RW	23	3	9	12	44	0	1	0	0
Randy Burridge	LW	23	2	10	12	16	9	0	0	0
Rick Middleton	RW	19	5	5	10	4	4	0	1	3
Tom McCarthy	LW	13	3	4	7	18	0	0	0	0
Moe Lemay	LW	15	4	2	6	32	1	0	0	0
Michael Thelven	D	21	3	3	6	26	4	1	0	0
Willi Plett	RW	17	2	4	6	74	5	0	0	1
Lyndon Byers	RW	11	1	2	3	62	1	0	0	0
Greg Hawgood	D	3	1	0	1	0	0	0	0	0
Bruce Shoebottom	D	4	1	0	1	42	4	0	0	1
John Blum	D	3	0	1	1	0	2	0	0	0
Greg Johnston	RW	3	0	1	1	2	2	0	0	0
Reed Larson	D	8	0	1	1	6	-2	0	0	0
Rejean Lemelin	G	17	0	1	1	2	0	0	0	0
Nevin Markwart	LW	2	0	0	0	2	1	0	0	0
Jay Miller	LW	12	0	0	0	124	2	0	0	0
Andy Moog	G	7	0	0	0	0	0	0	0	0
Bill O'Dwyer	C	9	0	0	0	0	2	0	0	0
Allen Pedersen	D	21	0	0	0	34	2	0	0	0

Goaltending

Player	MIN	GP	W	L	GA	GAA	SO	SA	SV	SV%
Rejean Lemelin	1027	17	11	6	45	2.63	1	430	385	.895
Andy Moog	354	7	1	4	25	4.24	0	166	141	.849
Team:	1,381	22	12	10	70	3.04	1	596	526	.883

Note:

Pos = Position;GP = Games played; G = Goals; A = Assists; Pts = Points; PIM = Penalty minutes; +/- = Plus/minus; PPG = Power-play goals; SHG = Short-handed goals; GWG = Game-winning goals
Pos = Position;GP = Games played; Min, TOI = Minutes played; W = Wins; L = Losses; T,T/OT = Ties; OTL = Overtime losses; GA = Goals-against; GAA = Goals-against average; SO = Shutouts; SA = Shots against; SV = Shots saved;SV% = Save percentage;

== Playoffs ==
=== Adams Division semifinals ===
Buffalo Sabres vs. Boston Bruins

The Boston Bruins were led by team co-captains Ray Bourque, Rick Middleton and the goaltending duo of Rejean Lemelin and the newly acquired Andy Moog. The Buffalo Sabres returned to the playoffs thanks to added depth provided by rookie Ray Sheppard.

Date	Away	Score	Home	Score
April 6	Buffalo	3	Boston	7
April 7	Buffalo	1	Boston	4
April 9	Boston	2	Buffalo	6
April 10	Boston	5	Buffalo	6
April 12	Buffalo	4	Boston	5
April 14	Boston	5	Buffalo	2

Boston wins best-of-seven series 4–2.

=== Adams Division finals ===
Boston Bruins vs. Montreal Canadiens

The Wales Conference's two best teams, and the NHL's two best defensive teams, met in this series with equal rest time. The Habs had beaten Boston in the Adams Division Semi-finals four years in a row, sweeping the Bruins in three of the past four seasons, and beating them 3–2 in a best-of-five the other year. This time, the Bruins' defence would wear down Montreal, as Ken Linseman, Ray Bourque and Cam Neely provided the offence to finally conquer the Canadiens. It was the first Bruins' playoff series win over the Habs in 44 seasons.

Date	Away	Score	Home	Score
April 18	Boston	1	Montreal	5
April 20	Boston	4	Montreal	3
April 22	Montreal	1	Boston	3
April 24	Montreal	0	Boston	2
April 26	Boston	4	Montreal	1

Boston wins best-of-seven series 4–1.

=== Prince of Wales Conference finals ===
New Jersey Devils vs. Boston Bruins

The Devils would take Boston to the limit, but their offense could not compete with the Bruins, who would make their first appearance in the Stanley Cup Finals since consecutive appearances in 1976–77 and 1977–78.

This series would also have the infamous confrontation between Devils head coach Jim Schoenfeld and referee Don Koharski after Game 3, when, during an argument in the tunnel after the game, Koharski tripped and fell, accusing Schoenfield of pushing him. Schoenfield famously responded, "You tripped and fell you fat pig!" He then yelled, "Have another doughnut! Have another doughnut!" The incident was played repeatedly on ESPN and has become part of NHL lore.

Schonefeld was suspended by NHL president John Ziegler for Game 4, but the Devils received an injunction from a New Jersey court, allowing Schoenfeld to coach the fourth game. In protest, the officials scheduled to work that game in the Meadlowands refused to take the ice, forcing the NHL to scramble for amateur officials to call the contest. The injunction was lifted and Schoenfeld served his suspension during Game 5 in the Boston Garden.

Date	Away	Score	Home	Score	OT
May 2	New Jersey	3	Boston	5	
May 4	New Jersey	3	Boston	2	(OT)
May 6	Boston	6	New Jersey	1	
May 8	Boston	1	New Jersey	3	
May 10	New Jersey	1	Boston	7	
May 12	Boston	3	New Jersey	6	
May 14	New Jersey	2	Boston	6	

Boston wins best-of-seven series 4–3.

=== Stanley Cup Finals ===
Boston Bruins vs. Edmonton Oilers

Date	Away	Score	Home	Score	Notes
May 18	Boston Bruins	1	Edmonton Oilers	2	
May 20	Boston Bruins	2	Edmonton Oilers	4	
May 22	Edmonton Oilers	6	Boston Bruins	3	
May 24	Edmonton Oilers	3	Boston Bruins	3	Game suspended at 16:33 of 2nd due to power failure.
May 26	Boston Bruins	3	Edmonton Oilers	6	

Edmonton wins best-of-seven series 4–0–1.

== Awards and records ==
- James Norris Memorial Trophy: || Ray Bourque
- Ray Bourque, NHL First Team All-Star
- Cam Neely, NHL Second Team All-Star
