= 1987–88 Philadelphia Flyers season =

NHL hockey team season

1987–88 Philadelphia Flyers
- Division: 3rd Patrick
- Conference: 4th Wales
- 1987–88 record: 38–33–9
- Home record: 20–14–6
- Road record: 18–19–3
- Goals for: 292 (12th)
- Goals against: 292 (9th)

Team information
- General manager: Bob Clarke
- Coach: Mike Keenan
- Captain: Dave Poulin
- Alternate captains: Mark Howe; Brad Marsh
- Arena: Spectrum
- Average attendance: 17,405
- Minor league affiliates: Hershey Bears; Flint Spirits

Team leaders
- Goals: Rick Tocchet (31)
- Assists: Brian Propp (49)
- Points: Murray Craven; Brian Propp (70)
- Penalty minutes: Rick Tocchet (299)
- Plus/minus: Kjell Samuelsson (+28)
- Wins: Ron Hextall (30)
- Goals against average: Ron Hextall (3.51)

The 1987–88 Philadelphia Flyers season was the franchise's 21st season in the National Hockey League (NHL). The Flyers lost in the first round of the playoffs to the Washington Capitals in seven games.

== Regular season ==
The season was one of many ups and downs. With Ron Hextall lost to an eight-game suspension to start the year after slashing Kent Nilsson in the Stanley Cup Final, Tim Kerr lost indefinitely with a shoulder problem, and Brad McCrimmon traded to Calgary over a salary dispute, the club limped to a 3–6–2 record in October. Additionally, Dave Brown served a 15-game suspension for cross-checking New York Ranger Tomas Sandstrom in the face on October 26.

The free-fall continued until late November. After blowing a 4–1 lead into a 6–4 loss to the Islanders at home on November 21, the Flyers were at 6–13–3 and last in the division. However, just as quickly, the club rebounded with a 14-game unbeaten streak (12–0–2) from November 25 to December 26 – despite losing out to the Pittsburgh Penguins in the Paul Coffey sweepstakes. The run was highlighted by Hextall becoming the first goaltender to shoot the puck into the opposing team's net on December 8, a game-winning two-man short tally by Murray Craven in Winnipeg on December 13, and a post-Christmas comeback win against the Capitals.

A 6–0–1 run through late February and early March saw Rick Tocchet post three hat tricks in a span of four games (Detroit, at Los Angeles, at Vancouver). On February 23, the club set a still-standing franchise road record with 11 goals in an amazing 11–6 win in Detroit, including a team-record 7 third-period tallies.

After a 7–3 win over the Canucks March 1, the Flyers finished the year in free-fall due to almost daily injuries, going 4–11–2, ending up the lower seed in a second-place tie with Washington. Kerr returned to the lineup finally on March 10, but was unable to find his range before the playoffs began.

=== Season standings ===
Patrick Division
	GP	W	L	T	GF	GA	Pts
**New York Islanders**	80	39	31	10	308	267	88
**Washington Capitals**	80	38	33	9	281	249	85
**Philadelphia Flyers**	80	38	33	9	292	292	85
**New Jersey Devils**	80	38	36	6	295	296	82
New York Rangers	80	36	34	10	300	283	82
Pittsburgh Penguins	80	36	35	9	319	316	81

Note: GP = Games played, W = Wins, L = Losses, T = Ties, Pts = Points, GF = Goals for, GA = Goals against
Note: Teams that qualified for the playoffs are highlighted in bold.

=== Record vs. opponents ===
Patrick Division record vs. opponents

==== Vs. Wales Conference ====
**Vs. Patrick Division**

1987–88 NHL records
Team	**NJD**	**NYI**	**NYR**	**PHI**	**PIT**	**WSH**	**Total**
New Jersey	—	3–4	3–4	5–0–2	6–1	2–5	19–14–2
N.Y. Islanders	4–3	—	2–2–3	3–3–1	2–4–1	4–2–1	15–14–6
N.Y. Rangers	4–3	2–2–3	—	3–3–1	2–3–2	2–5	13–16–6
Philadelphia	0–5–2	3–3–1	3–3–1	—	5–2	2–4–1	13–17–5
Pittsburgh	1–6	4–2–1	3–2–2	2–5	—	5–1–1	15–16–4
Washington	5–2	2–4–1	5–2	4–2–1	1–5–1	—	17–15–3

**Vs. Adams Division**

1987–88 NHL records
Team	**BOS**	**BUF**	**HFD**	**MTL**	**QUE**	**Total**
New Jersey	1–2	0–2–1	1–1–1	2–1	0–3	4–9–2
N.Y. Islanders	2–1	2–1	2–1	0–3	2–1	8–7–0
N.Y. Rangers	2–1	0–3	2–1	1–1–1	2–1	7–7–1
Philadelphia	2–1	3–0	2–1	0–1–2	2–0–1	9–3–3
Pittsburgh	0–2–1	2–0–1	2–1	2–1	3–0	9–4–2
Washington	2–1	0–2–1	2–1	1–1–1	2–1	7–6–2

==== Vs. Campbell Conference ====
**Vs. Norris Division**

1987–88 NHL records
Team	**CHI**	**DET**	**MIN**	**STL**	**TOR**	**Total**
New Jersey	3–0	0–3	3–0	3–0	2–1	11–4–0
N.Y. Islanders	0–1–2	1–2	1–1–1	2–0–1	0–3	4–7–4
N.Y. Rangers	2–0–1	1–1–1	2–1	3–0	2–1	10–3–2
Philadelphia	0–3	2–0–1	2–1	2–1	1–2	7–7–1
Pittsburgh	2–1	1–2	2–1	0–3	2–1	7–8–0
Washington	2–1	0–2–1	2–0–1	0–2–1	1–1–1	5–6–4

**Vs. Smythe Division**

1987–88 NHL records
Team	**CGY**	**EDM**	**LAK**	**VAN**	**WIN**	**Total**
New Jersey	1–2	2–1	1–1–1	0–3	0–2–1	4–9–2
N.Y. Islanders	2–1	2–1	3–0	3–0	2–1	12–3–0
N.Y. Rangers	1–2	1–2	0–3	2–1	2–0–1	6–8–1
Philadelphia	0–3	1–2	3–0	2–1	3–0	9–6–0
Pittsburgh	2–0–1	0–3	1–0–2	1–2	1–2	5–7–3
Washington	1–2	2–1	2–1	3–0	1–2	9–6–0

== Playoffs ==
In their first round playoff series with the Washington Capitals, the Flyers blew a 3–1 series lead as Washington forced a Game 7. They then blew a 3–0 lead in Game 7 as Washington won 5–4, in overtime.

Afterwards, general manager Bobby Clarke fired head coach Mike Keenan citing a lack of enthusiasm from the club to continue playing for him.

== Schedule and results ==
=== Regular season ===
1987–88 regular season
October: 3–6–2, 8 points (home: 1–4–1; road: 2–2–1)

Game	Date	Score	Opponent	Decision	Record	Points	Recap
1	October 8	2–2 OT	Montreal Canadiens	Laforest	0–0–1	1	T
2	October 10	5–4	@ Minnesota North Stars	Laforest	1–0–1	3	W
3	October 11	3–5	Chicago Blackhawks	Laforest	1–1–1	3	L
4	October 15	0–6	New York Islanders	Laforest	1–2–1	3	L
5	October 17	4–3	@ New York Islanders	Young	2–2–1	5	W
6	October 18	3–2	Pittsburgh Penguins	Young	3–2–1	7	W
7	October 22	1–4	Washington Capitals	Young	3–3–1	7	L
8	October 24	3–5	New York Rangers	Laforest	3–4–1	7	L
9	October 26	2–2 OT	@ New York Rangers	Hextall	3–4–2	8	T
10	October 27	0–4	@ New Jersey Devils	Hextall	3–5–2	8	L
11	October 31	4–7	@ Hartford Whalers	Hextall	3–6–2	8	L

November: 5–7–1, 11 points (home: 4–3–1; road: 1–4–0)

Game	Date	Score	Opponent	Decision	Record	Points	Recap
12	November 1	4–1	Los Angeles Kings	Hextall	4–6–2	10	W
13	November 3	1–5	@ Pittsburgh Penguins	Hextall	4–7–2	10	L
14	November 5	3–4	Vancouver Canucks	Hextall	4–8–2	10	L
15	November 7	4–5	@ Montreal Canadiens	Hextall	4–9–2	10	L
16	November 8	3–3 OT	New Jersey Devils	Hextall	4–9–3	11	T
17	November 10	2–5	@ St. Louis Blues	Hextall	4–10–3	11	L
18	November 12	5–2	Pittsburgh Penguins	Hextall	5–10–3	13	W
19	November 14	0–6	Toronto Maple Leafs	Hextall	5–11–3	13	L
20	November 18	3–4	@ New Jersey Devils	Hextall	5–12–3	13	L
21	November 19	7–5	Los Angeles Kings	Young	6–12–3	15	W
22	November 21	4–6	New York Islanders	Young	6–13–3	15	L
23	November 25	5–2	Buffalo Sabres	Hextall	7–13–3	17	W
24	November 28	6–3	@ Quebec Nordiques	Hextall	8–13–3	19	W

December: 10–2–2, 22 points (home: 5–0–1; road: 5–2–1)

Game	Date	Score	Opponent	Decision	Record	Points	Recap
25	December 3	5–2	Hartford Whalers	Hextall	9–13–3	21	W
26	December 6	1–1 OT	New Jersey Devils	Hextall	9–13–4	22	T
27	December 8	5–2	Boston Bruins	Hextall	10–13–4	24	W
28	December 10	5–3	New York Rangers	Hextall	11–13–4	26	W
29	December 11	3–3 OT	@ Detroit Red Wings	Laforest	11–13–5	27	T
30	December 13	4–3	@ Winnipeg Jets	Hextall	12–13–5	29	W
31	December 15	5–2	@ Pittsburgh Penguins	Hextall	13–13–5	31	W
32	December 17	4–3	New York Islanders	Hextall	14–13–5	33	W
33	December 19	5–4	@ New York Islanders	Hextall	15–13–5	35	W
34	December 22	6–4	@ New York Rangers	Hextall	16–13–5	37	W
35	December 23	5–3	Minnesota North Stars	Hextall	17–13–5	39	W
36	December 26	3–2	@ Washington Capitals	Hextall	18–13–5	41	W
37	December 30	0–6	@ Edmonton Oilers	Hextall	18–14–5	41	L
38	December 31	4–5	@ Calgary Flames	Laforest	18–15–5	41	L

January: 8–5–1, 17 points (home: 4–4–0; road: 4–1–1)

Game	Date	Score	Opponent	Decision	Record	Points	Recap
39	January 2	4–1	@ Vancouver Canucks	Hextall	19–15–5	43	W
40	January 5	1–3	Washington Capitals	Hextall	19–16–5	43	L
41	January 7	6–4	St. Louis Blues	Hextall	20–16–5	45	W
42	January 9	3–3 OT	@ Montreal Canadiens	Hextall	20–16–6	46	T
43	January 10	5–7	New Jersey Devils	Laforest	20–17–6	46	L
44	January 14	3–1	Buffalo Sabres	Hextall	21–17–6	48	W
45	January 15	5–4	@ Pittsburgh Penguins	Hextall	22–17–6	50	W
46	January 17	2–1	@ New York Rangers	Hextall	23–17–6	52	W
47	January 21	3–1	Edmonton Oilers	Hextall	24–17–6	54	W
48	January 23	6–4	@ Boston Bruins	Hextall	25–17–6	56	W
49	January 24	3–5	Minnesota North Stars	Hextall	25–18–6	56	L
50	January 28	2–5	New York Rangers	Hextall	25–19–6	56	L
51	January 30	4–3	Winnipeg Jets	Laforest	26–19–6	58	W
52	January 31	0–1 OT	@ Washington Capitals	Hextall	26–20–6	58	L

February: 7–2–1, 15 points (home: 3–1–1; road: 4–1–0)

Game	Date	Score	Opponent	Decision	Record	Points	Recap
53	February 4	6–1	Toronto Maple Leafs	Hextall	27–20–6	60	W
54	February 6	4–2	@ St. Louis Blues	Hextall	28–20–6	62	W
55	February 12	2–3	Calgary Flames	Hextall	28–21–6	62	L
56	February 13	4–7	@ Toronto Maple Leafs	Hextall	28–22–6	62	L
57	February 15	5–4 OT	Hartford Whalers	Hextall	29–22–6	64	W
58	February 18	3–3 OT	New York Islanders	Hextall	29–22–7	65	T
59	February 19	5–4	@ Buffalo Sabres	Hextall	30–22–7	67	W
60	February 21	5–3	Detroit Red Wings	Hextall	31–22–7	69	W
61	February 23	11–6	@ Detroit Red Wings	Laforest	32–22–7	71	W
62	February 27	8–6	@ Los Angeles Kings	Hextall	33–22–7	73	W

March: 4–11–1, 9 points (home: 3–3–1; road: 1–8–0)

Game	Date	Score	Opponent	Decision	Record	Points	Recap
63	March 1	7–3	@ Vancouver Canucks	Hextall	34–22–7	75	W
64	March 3	3–6	@ Calgary Flames	Hextall	34–23–7	75	L
65	March 4	4–7	@ Edmonton Oilers	Laforest	34–24–7	75	L
66	March 6	2–4	@ New Jersey Devils	Hextall	34–25–7	75	L
67	March 10	5–2	Washington Capitals	Hextall	35–25–7	77	W
68	March 12	5–6	New Jersey Devils	Hextall	35–26–7	77	L
69	March 13	4–5 OT	@ Chicago Blackhawks	Hextall	35–27–7	77	L
70	March 15	1–3	@ New York Rangers	Hextall	35–28–7	77	L
71	March 17	3–4 OT	Chicago Blackhawks	Hextall	35–29–7	77	L
72	March 19	0–7	@ Pittsburgh Penguins	Hextall	35–30–7	77	L
73	March 20	4–2	Pittsburgh Penguins	Laforest	36–30–7	79	W
74	March 22	0–3	Boston Bruins	Laforest	36–31–7	79	L
75	March 25	3–5	@ Washington Capitals	Laforest	36–32–7	79	L
76	March 26	6–0	Winnipeg Jets	Laforest	37–32–7	81	W
77	March 29	3–5	@ New York Islanders	Laforest	37–33–7	81	L
78	March 31	4–4 OT	Quebec Nordiques	Hextall	37–33–8	82	T

April: 1–0–1, 3 points (home: 0–0–1; road: 1–0–0)

Game	Date	Score	Opponent	Decision	Record	Points	Recap
79	April 2	7–4	@ Quebec Nordiques	Hextall	38–33–8	84	W
80	April 3	2–2 OT	Washington Capitals	Hextall	38–33–9	85	T

Legend: W Win (2 points) L Loss (0 points) T Tie (1 point)

=== Playoffs ===
1988 Stanley Cup playoffs
Patrick Division semifinals vs. Washington Capitals – Capitals win 4–3

Game	Date	Score	Opponent	Decision	Series	Recap
1	April 6	4–2	@ Washington Capitals	Hextall	Flyers lead 1–0	W
2	April 7	4–5	@ Washington Capitals	Hextall	Series tied 1–1	L
3	April 9	4–3	Washington Capitals	Hextall	Flyers lead 2–1	W
4	April 10	5–4 OT	Washington Capitals	Laforest	Flyers lead 3–1	W
5	April 12	2–5	@ Washington Capitals	Hextall	Flyers lead 3–2	L
6	April 14	2–7	Washington Capitals	Hextall	Series tied 3–3	L
7	April 16	4–5 OT	@ Washington Capitals	Hextall	Capitals win 4–3	L

Legend: W Win L Loss

== Player statistics ==
=== Scoring ===
- Position abbreviations: C = Center; D = Defense; G = Goaltender; LW = Left wing; RW = Right wing
- † = Joined team via a transaction (e.g., trade, waivers, signing) during the season. Stats reflect time with the Flyers only.
- ‡ = Left team via a transaction (e.g., trade, waivers, release) during the season. Stats reflect time with the Flyers only.

No.	Player	Pos	Regular season						Playoffs					
No.	Player	Pos	GP	G	A	Pts	+/-	PIM	GP	G	A	Pts	+/-	PIM
32	Murray Craven	LW	72	30	46	76	25	58	7	2	5	7	1	4
26	Brian Propp	LW	74	27	49	76	8	76	7	4	2	6	2	8
22	Rick Tocchet	RW	65	31	33	64	3	299	5	1	4	5	−1	55
2	Mark Howe	D	75	19	43	62	23	62	7	3	6	9	7	4
25	Peter Zezel	C	69	22	35	57	7	42	7	3	2	5	0	7
19	Scott Mellanby	RW	75	25	26	51	−7	185	7	0	1	1	−6	16
20	Dave Poulin	C	68	19	32	51	17	32	7	2	6	8	5	4
23	Ilkka Sinisalo	RW	68	25	17	42	2	30	7	4	2	6	4	0
9	Pelle Eklund	C	71	10	32	42	−6	12	7	0	3	3	4	0
3	Doug Crossman	D	76	9	29	38	−1	43	7	1	1	2	−9	8
14	Ron Sutter	C	69	8	25	33	−9	146	7	0	1	1	−7	26
28	Kjell Samuelsson	D	74	6	24	30	28	184	7	2	5	7	8	23
24	Derrick Smith	LW	76	16	8	24	−20	104	7	0	0	0	−7	6
5	Kerry Huffman	D	52	6	17	23	−11	34	2	0	0	0	0	0
21	Dave Brown	RW	47	12	5	17	10	114	7	1	0	1	−4	27
44 (Note: Huber wore number 47 in his first three games after being acquired.)	Willie Huber†	D	10	4	9	13	−2	16	5	0	0	0	−3	2
8	Brad Marsh	D	70	3	9	12	−13	57	7	1	0	1	−8	8
18	Lindsay Carson‡	C	36	2	7	9	−4	37	—	—	—	—	—	—
7	Brian Dobbin	RW	21	3	5	8	−1	6	—	—	—	—	—	—
27	Ron Hextall	G	62	1	6	7		104	7	0	2	2		30
6 (Note: Smyth wore number 40 through March 6.)	Greg Smyth	D	48	1	6	7	−2	192	5	0	0	0	1	38
10	Magnus Roupe	LW	33	2	4	6	−6	32	—	—	—	—	—	—
17 (Note: Berube wore number 34 in his first three games.)	Craig Berube	LW	27	3	2	5	1	108	—	—	—	—	—	—
12	Tim Kerr	RW	8	3	2	5	0	12	6	1	3	4	−2	4
18	Paul Lawless†‡	LW	8	0	5	5	0	0	—	—	—	—	—	—
15	J. J. Daigneault	D	28	2	2	4	−8	12	—	—	—	—	—	—
42	Don Nachbaur	C	20	0	4	4	2	61	2	0	0	0	−1	2
36	Gordie Roberts†‡	D	11	1	2	3	7	15	—	—	—	—	—	—
34 (Note: Root wore number 48 in his first game after being acquired.)	Bill Root†	D	24	1	2	3	3	16	2	0	0	0	0	2
36	Al Hill	LW	12	1	0	1	0	10	1	0	1	1	1	4
11	Glen Seabrooke	LW	6	0	1	1	−1	2	—	—	—	—	—	—
40 (Note: Chychrun wore number 6 in his first two games.)	Jeff Chychrun	D	3	0	0	0	−1	4	—	—	—	—	—	—
39	David Fenyves	D	5	0	0	0	−1	0	—	—	—	—	—	—
29	Nick Fotiu	LW	23	0	0	0	−9	40	—	—	—	—	—	—
45	Mark Freer	C	1	0	0	0	−2	0	—	—	—	—	—	—
33	Mark Laforest	G	21	0	0	0		8	2	0	0	0		10
37	Mitch Lamoureux	C	3	0	0	0	−1	0	—	—	—	—	—	—
39	Mike Murray	C	1	0	0	0	0	0	—	—	—	—	—	—
41	John Stevens	D	3	0	0	0	−1	0	—	—	—	—	—	—
44	Mike Stothers‡	D	3	0	0	0	−1	13	—	—	—	—	—	—
30	Wendell Young	G	6	0	0	0		0	—	—	—	—	—	—

=== Goaltending ===
No.	Player	Regular season											Playoffs									
No.	Player	GP	GS	W	L	T	SA	GA	GAA	SV%	SO	TOI	GP	GS	W	L	SA	GA	GAA	SV%	SO	TOI
27	Ron Hextall	62	61	30	22	7	1816	208	3.51	.886	0	3,557	7	7	2	4	196	30	4.75	.847	0	379
33	Mark Laforest	21	14	5	9	2	476	60	3.72	.874	1	969	2	0	1	0	12	1	1.25	.917	0	48
30	Wendell Young	6	5	3	2	0	148	20	3.76	.866	0	319	—	—	—	—	—	—	—	—	—	—

== Awards and records ==
=== Awards ===
Type	Award/honor	Recipient	Ref
League (annual)	Lester Patrick Trophy	Keith Allen	
League (in-season)	NHL All-Star Game selection	Ron Hextall (Note: Hextall was voted to the starting lineup.)	
League (in-season)	NHL All-Star Game selection	Mark Howe	
League (in-season)	NHL All-Star Game selection	Mike Keenan (Coach)	
League (in-season)	NHL All-Star Game selection	Dave Poulin	
League (in-season)	NHL All-Star Game selection	Kjell Samuelsson	
League (in-season)	NHL Player of the Week	Ron Hextall (December 14)	
League (in-season)	NHL Player of the Week	Mark Howe (December 28)	
League (in-season)	NHL Player of the Week	Ron Hextall (January 18)	
League (in-season)	NHL Player of the Week	Rick Tocchet (February 28)	
League (in-season)	NHL Player of the Week	Rick Tocchet (March 10)	
Team	Barry Ashbee Trophy	Mark Howe	
Team	Bobby Clarke Trophy	Ron Hextall	
Team	Class Guy Award	Rick Tocchet	

=== Records ===
Among the team records set during the 1987–88 season was the nine consecutive wins by goaltender Ron Hextall from December 8 to December 26, tying a team record. On February 23, the Flyers scored the fastest five goals in team history, taking five minutes and twenty-nine seconds to do so. On February 27, Rick Tocchet scored four goals to tie the team record. The eight-game road losing streak from March 3 to March 29 is tied for the longest in team history. On March 19, Don Nachbaur took a team record eight penalties. Mark Howe set a single season high for powerplay goals scored by a defenseman (8, later tied). The 208 goals allowed by Hextall is a single season high for a Flyers goaltender. The team’s three road ties is tied for the fewest in franchise history. The 31 goals allowed during their division semifinal series against the Washington Capitals is the most allowed during any playoff series the Flyers have played.

=== Milestones ===
Milestone	Player	Date	Ref
First game	Magnus Roupe	October 8, 1987	
First game	Mike Murray	March 15, 1988	

== Transactions ==
The Flyers were involved in the following transactions from June 1, 1987, the day after the deciding game of the 1987 Stanley Cup Final, through May 26, 1988, the day of the deciding game of the 1988 Stanley Cup Final.

=== Trades ===
Date	Details		Ref
June 13, 1987	To Philadelphia Flyers: Mark Laforest	To Detroit Red Wings: 2nd-round pick in 1987	
June 13, 1987	To Philadelphia Flyers: 5th-round pick in 1989	To Vancouver Canucks: Vancouver's 5th-round pick in 1987	
July 21, 1987	To Philadelphia Flyers: Future considerations	To New York Rangers: Jeff Brubaker	
August 26, 1987	To Philadelphia Flyers: 1st-round pick in 1989; 3rd-round pick in 1988	To Calgary Flames: Brad McCrimmon	
August 31, 1987	To Philadelphia Flyers: Wendell Young; 3rd-round pick in 1990	To Vancouver Canucks: Darren Jensen; Daryl Stanley	
December 4, 1987	To Philadelphia Flyers: 5th-round pick in 1989	To Toronto Maple Leafs: Mike Stothers	
January 22, 1988	To Philadelphia Flyers: Paul Lawless	To Hartford Whalers: Lindsay Carson	
February 9, 1988	To Philadelphia Flyers: Gordie Roberts	To Minnesota North Stars: 4th-round pick in 1988 or 1989 (Note: The Flyers had the choice of which year to send to Minnesota. The Flyers chose the 1989 draft pick.)	
March 1, 1988	To Philadelphia Flyers: Willie Huber	To Vancouver Canucks: Paul Lawless; Vancouver's 5th-round pick in 1989	
March 8, 1988	To Philadelphia Flyers: 4th or 5th-round pick in 1989 (Note: The Flyers would receive St. Louis' 4th-round pick if the Blues advanced past the first round of the playoffs, which they did.)	To St. Louis Blues: Gordie Roberts	

=== Players acquired ===
Date	Player	Former team	Term	Via	Ref
July 21, 1987	Don Biggs	Edmonton Oilers		Free agency	
August 19, 1987	Mark Lofthouse	Los Angeles Kings		Free agency	
October 5, 1987	David Fenyves	Buffalo Sabres		Waiver draft	
October 30, 1987	Nick Fotiu	Calgary Flames	1-year	Free agency	
November 26, 1987	Bill Root	St. Louis Blues		Waivers	
April 20, 1988	Michael Boyce	Merrimack College (NCAA)		Free agency	

=== Players lost ===
Date	Player	New team	Via	Ref
June 1987	Glenn Resch		Retirement	
October 3, 1987	Steve Martinson	Detroit Red Wings	Free agency	
October 5, 1987	Ed Hospodar	Buffalo Sabres	Waiver draft	
October 5, 1987	Tim Tookey	Los Angeles Kings	Waiver draft	
N/A	Jere Gillis	Brunico SG (Serie A)	Free agency	

=== Signings ===
Date	Player	Term	Ref
November 12, 1987	Shaun Sabol		
November 17, 1987	Ron Hextall	multi-year	

== Draft picks ==
=== NHL entry draft ===
Philadelphia's picks at the 1987 NHL entry draft, which was held at Joe Louis Arena in Detroit, on June 13, 1987. The Flyers traded their second-round pick, 41st overall, to the Detroit Red Wings for Mark Laforest on June 13, 1987.

Round	Pick	Player	Position	Nationality	Team (league)	Notes
1	20	Darren Rumble	Defense	Canada	Kitchener Rangers (OHL)	
2	30	Jeff Harding	Right wing	Canada	St. Michael's Buzzers (Toronto)	(Note: The Flyers acquired a second-round pick, 30th overall, from the Quebec Nordiques for a 1986 second-round pick on June 21, 1986.)
3	62	Martin Hostak	Right wing	Czechoslovakia	Sparta Praha (Czech)	
4	83	Tomaz Eriksson	Left wing	Sweden	Djurgardens IF (Elitserien)	
5	104	Bill Gall	Defense	United States	New Hampton School (N.H.)	
6	125	Tony Link	Defense	United States	Dimond High School (Alaska)	
7	146	Marc Strapon	Defense	United States	Hayward High School (Wisconsin)	
8	167	Darryl Ingham	Right wing	Canada	University of Manitoba (CIAU)	
9	188	Bruce MacDonald	Right wing	United States	Loomis Chaffee School (Conn.)	
10	209	Steve Morrow	Defense	United States	Westminster School (Conn.)	
11	230	Darius Rusnak	Center	Czechoslovakia	Slovan Bratislava (Slovakia)	
12	251	Dale Roehl	Goaltender	United States	Minnetonka High School (Minn.)	

=== NHL supplemental draft ===
Philadelphia's picks at the 1987 NHL supplemental draft.

Round	Pick	Player	Position	Nationality	Team (league)
2	21	David Whyte	Left wing	United States	Boston College (HE)

== Farm teams ==
The Flyers were affiliated with the Hershey Bears of the AHL and the Flint Spirits of the IHL. Led by the Louis A. R. Pieri Memorial Award winner as coach of the year (John Paddock), the Eddie Shore Award winner as top defenseman (Dave Fenyves), and the Aldege "Baz" Bastien Memorial Award as top goaltender (Wendell Young), Hershey finished first in their division and swept their way through the playoffs with a 12–0 record to a Calder Cup championship. Young was given the Jack A. Butterfield Trophy as playoff MVP. In their only season as a Flyers affiliate, Flint finished fourth in the playoffs and lost in the finals to the Salt Lake Golden Eagles in six games.
