= 1987–88 Toronto Maple Leafs season =

NHL hockey team season

1987–88 Toronto Maple Leafs
- Division: 4th Norris
- Conference: 9th Campbell
- 1987–88 record: 21–49–10
- Home record: 14–20–6
- Road record: 7–29–4
- Goals for: 273
- Goals against: 345

Team information
- General manager: Gerry McNamara
- Coach: John Brophy
- Captain: Vacant
- Alternate captains: Wendel Clark; Borje Salming; Unknown
- Arena: Maple Leaf Gardens

Team leaders
- Goals: Eddie Olczyk (42)
- Assists: Mark Osborne (37)
- Points: Eddie Olczyk (75)
- Penalty minutes: Al Secord (221)
- Wins: Ken Wregget (12)
- Goals against average: Allan Bester (3.81)

The 1987–88 Toronto Maple Leafs season saw the Maple Leafs finish in fourth place in the Norris Division with a record of 21 wins, 49 losses, and 10 ties for 52 points. Despite posting the second-worst record in the league, they qualified for the Stanley Cup playoffs for the third year in a row on the last day of the season, in part due to playing in an extremely weak Norris Division; the division champion Detroit Red Wings were the only team in the division with a winning record. Their .325 winning percentage is the third-worst in franchise history and one of the lowest ever for a playoff qualifier (Across all major North American sports leagues). For an NHL team, their .325 percentage is the worst mark to qualify for the playoffs for a team that played at least 70 games. They lost to the Red Wings in six games in the Division Semi-finals, including an embarrassing 8–0 defeat in Game 4. On February 7 1988 Gerry McNamara was fired by the Leafs.

== Regular season ==
The Maple Leafs finished last in power-play goals scored (54), power-play opportunities (347) and power-play percentage (15.56%).

=== Final standings ===
Norris Division
	GP	W	L	T	GF	GA	Pts
**Detroit Red Wings**	80	41	28	11	322	269	93
**St. Louis Blues**	80	34	38	8	278	294	76
**Chicago Blackhawks**	80	30	41	9	284	328	69
**Toronto Maple Leafs**	80	21	49	10	273	345	52
Minnesota North Stars	80	19	48	13	242	349	51

Note: GP = Games played, W = Wins, L = Losses, T = Ties, Pts = Points, GF = Goals for, GA = Goals against
Note: Teams that qualified for the playoffs are highlighted in bold.

=== Record vs. opponents ===
Norris Division record vs. opponents

==== Vs. Campbell Conference ====
**Vs. Norris Division**

1987–88 NHL records
Team	**CHI**	**DET**	**MIN**	**STL**	**TOR**	**Total**
Chicago	—	3–5	5–2–1	3–4–1	5–3	**16–14–2**
Detroit	5–3	—	4–3–1	4–1–3	3–3–2	**16–10–6**
Minnesota	2–5–1	3–4–1	—	2–5–1	4–1–3	**11–15–6**
St. Louis	4–3–1	1–4–3	5–2–1	—	6–1–1	**16–10–6**
Toronto	3–5	3–3–2	1–4–3	1–6–1	—	**8–18–6**

**Vs. Smythe Division**

1987–88 NHL records
Team	**CGY**	**EDM**	**LAK**	**VAN**	**WIN**	**Total**
Chicago	0–2–1	2–1	1–2	2–1	1–1–1	**6–7–2**
Detroit	1–1–1	2–1	2–1	2–1	2–0–1	**9–4–2**
Minnesota	0–2–1	0–2–1	0–3	1–2	0–2–1	**1–11–3**
St. Louis	1–2	0–3	1–2	2–1	1–2	**5–10–0**
Toronto	0–3	0–2–1	1–1–1	1–1–1	1–2	**3–9–3**

**Vs. Wales Conference**

**Vs. Adams Division**

1987–88 NHL records
Team	**BOS**	**BUF**	**HFD**	**MTL**	**QUE**	**Total**
Chicago	0–3	1–2	1–2	0–2–1	0–2–1	**2–11–2**
Detroit	2–1	2–1	1–2	1–2	0–3	**6–9–0**
Minnesota	0–3	1–1–1	0–3	1–1–1	1–2	**3–10–2**
St. Louis	2–1	0–3	2–1	1–2	2–1	**7–8–0**
Toronto	1–2	0–3	0–3	0–3	0–3	**1–14–0**

**Vs. Patrick Division**

1987–88 NHL records
Team	**NJD**	**NYI**	**NYR**	**PHI**	**PIT**	**WSH**	**Total**
Chicago	0–3	1–0–2	0–2–1	3–0	1–2	1–2	**6–9–3**
Detroit	3–0	2–1	1–1–1	0–2–1	2–1	2–0–1	**10–5–3**
Minnesota	0–3	1–1–1	1–2	1–2	1–2	0–2–1	**4–12–2**
St. Louis	0–3	0–2–1	0–3	1–2	3–0	2–0–1	**6–10–2**
Toronto	1–2	3–0	1–2	2–1	1–2	1–1–1	**9–8–1**

== Schedule and results ==
1987–88 regular season
October

Game	Result	Date	Score	Opponent	Record
1	W	October 8, 1987	7–5	@ Chicago Blackhawks (1987–88)	1–0–0
2	W	October 10, 1987	5–2	New Jersey Devils (1987–88)	2–0–0
3	L	October 14, 1987	3–4	@ Minnesota North Stars (1987–88)	2–1–0
4	L	October 16, 1987	2–3	@ Detroit Red Wings (1987–88)	2–2–0
5	W	October 17, 1987	7–4	Detroit Red Wings (1987–88)	3–2–0
6	L	October 21, 1987	3–10	Montreal Canadiens (1987–88)	3–3–0
7	L	October 24, 1987	4–7	Minnesota North Stars (1987–88)	3–4–0
8	W	October 28, 1987	5–2	New York Islanders (1987–88)	4–4–0
9	W	October 29, 1987	4–0	@ Pittsburgh Penguins (1987–88)	5–4–0
10	W	October 31, 1987	6–5	Chicago Blackhawks (1987–88)	6–4–0

November

Game	Result	Date	Score	Opponent	Record
11	W	November 4, 1987	7–3	Winnipeg Jets (1987–88)	7–4–0
12	W	November 5, 1987	7–6	@ Boston Bruins (1987–88)	8–4–0
13	L	November 7, 1987	3–4	St. Louis Blues (1987–88)	8–5–0
14	L	November 9, 1987	1–3	@ Montreal Canadiens (1987–88)	8–6–0
15	L	November 11, 1987	2–3	Boston Bruins (1987–88)	8–7–0
16	W	November 14, 1987	6–0	@ Philadelphia Flyers (1987–88)	9–7–0
17	L	November 15, 1987	4–5	@ Buffalo Sabres (1987–88)	9–8–0
18	L	November 18, 1987	3–6	St. Louis Blues (1987–88)	9–9–0
19	T	November 19, 1987	3–3 OT	@ St. Louis Blues (1987–88)	9–9–1
20	T	November 21, 1987	6–6 OT	Los Angeles Kings (1987–88)	9–9–2
21	W	November 24, 1987	4–3	@ New York Islanders (1987–88)	10–9–2
22	L	November 25, 1987	3–5	@ New York Rangers (1987–88)	10–10–2
23	L	November 28, 1987	2–4	Hartford Whalers (1987–88)	10–11–2

December

Game	Result	Date	Score	Opponent	Record
24	L	December 1, 1987	2–3 OT	@ Minnesota North Stars (1987–88)	10–12–2
25	L	December 3, 1987	3–5	@ Calgary Flames (1987–88)	10–13–2
26	L	December 5, 1987	2–5	@ Edmonton Oilers (1987–88)	10–14–2
27	W	December 7, 1987	5–4 OT	Detroit Red Wings (1987–88)	11–14–2
28	W	December 12, 1987	4–3	New York Rangers (1987–88)	12–14–2
29	L	December 13, 1987	1–5	@ Chicago Blackhawks (1987–88)	12–15–2
30	W	December 15, 1987	5–3	Washington Capitals (1987–88)	13–15–2
31	L	December 18, 1987	2–4	@ Washington Capitals (1987–88)	13–16–2
32	L	December 19, 1987	2–6	Chicago Blackhawks (1987–88)	13–17–2
33	T	December 21, 1987	0–0 OT	Minnesota North Stars (1987–88)	13–17–3
34	W	December 23, 1987	5–1	@ St. Louis Blues (1987–88)	14–17–3
35	L	December 26, 1987	2–4	Montreal Canadiens (1987–88)	14–18–3
36	T	December 28, 1987	4–4 OT	Washington Capitals (1987–88)	14–18–4
37	L	December 30, 1987	1–3	@ Hartford Whalers (1987–88)	14–19–4

January

Game	Result	Date	Score	Opponent	Record
38	L	January 2, 1988	4–6	Buffalo Sabres (1987–88)	14–20–4
39	T	January 4, 1988	7–7 OT	Vancouver Canucks (1987–88)	14–20–5
40	T	January 6, 1988	5–5 OT	Minnesota North Stars (1987–88)	14–20–6
41	L	January 8, 1988	3–7	@ Chicago Blackhawks (1987–88)	14–21–6
42	L	January 10, 1988	3–4	@ Winnipeg Jets (1987–88)	14–22–6
43	T	January 13, 1988	3–3 OT	@ Minnesota North Stars (1987–88)	14–22–7
44	L	January 15, 1988	3–7	@ New Jersey Devils (1987–88)	14–23–7
45	L	January 16, 1988	3–4	Pittsburgh Penguins (1987–88)	14–24–7
46	L	January 18, 1988	3–4	@ Detroit Red Wings (1987–88)	14–25–7
47	L	January 21, 1988	4–5	Quebec Nordiques (1987–88)	14–26–7
48	L	January 23, 1988	2–3	Chicago Blackhawks (1987–88)	14–27–7
49	L	January 25, 1988	3–11	Calgary Flames (1987–88)	14–28–7
50	W	January 27, 1988	5–2	Los Angeles Kings (1987–88)	15–28–7
51	T	January 29, 1988	3–3 OT	@ Detroit Red Wings (1987–88)	15–28–8
52	T	January 30, 1988	5–5 OT	Detroit Red Wings (1987–88)	15–28–9

February

Game	Result	Date	Score	Opponent	Record
53	L	February 1, 1988	4–5	St. Louis Blues (1987–88)	15–29–9
54	L	February 4, 1988	1–6	@ Philadelphia Flyers (1987–88)	15–30–9
55	L	February 5, 1988	2–5	@ Buffalo Sabres (1987–88)	15–31–9
56	L	February 7, 1988	2–4	@ Hartford Whalers (1987–88)	15–32–9
57	W	February 11, 1988	4–3	New York Islanders (1987–88)	16–32–9
58	W	February 13, 1988	7–4	Philadelphia Flyers (1987–88)	17–32–9
59	L	February 14, 1988	2–7	New Jersey Devils (1987–88)	17–33–9
60	T	February 17, 1988	4–4 OT	@ Edmonton Oilers (1987–88)	17–33–10
61	W	February 19, 1988	5–0	@ Vancouver Canucks (1987–88)	18–33–10
62	L	February 20, 1988	0–3	@ Los Angeles Kings (1987–88)	18–34–10
63	L	February 22, 1988	2–4	@ Minnesota North Stars (1987–88)	18–35–10
64	W	February 24, 1988	4–2	Minnesota North Stars (1987–88)	19–35–10
65	L	February 27, 1988	2–6	St. Louis Blues (1987–88)	19–36–10

March

Game	Result	Date	Score	Opponent	Record
66	L	March 2, 1988	3–4	Quebec Nordiques (1987–88)	19–37–10
67	L	March 3, 1988	3–5	@ Boston Bruins (1987–88)	19–38–10
68	L	March 5, 1988	1–10	Winnipeg Jets (1987–88)	19–39–10
69	L	March 8, 1988	2–3	@ St. Louis Blues (1987–88)	19–40–10
70	L	March 9, 1988	3–4	@ Chicago Blackhawks (1987–88)	19–41–10
71	W	March 12, 1988	6–4	Chicago Blackhawks (1987–88)	20–41–10
72	L	March 15, 1988	2–3	@ Quebec Nordiques (1987–88)	20–42–10
73	L	March 16, 1988	2–5	@ Pittsburgh Penguins (1987–88)	20–43–10
74	L	March 19, 1988	3–4	New York Rangers (1987–88)	20–44–10
75	L	March 22, 1988	3–5	@ Vancouver Canucks (1987–88)	20–45–10
76	L	March 24, 1988	1–7	@ Calgary Flames (1987–88)	20–46–10
77	L	March 26, 1988	2–3 OT	@ St. Louis Blues (1987–88)	20–47–10
78	L	March 28, 1988	4–6	Edmonton Oilers (1987–88)	20–48–10

April

Game	Result	Date	Score	Opponent	Record
79	L	April 1, 1988	3–7	@ Detroit Red Wings (1987–88)	20–49–10
80	W	April 2, 1988	5–3	Detroit Red Wings (1987–88)	21–49–10

Legend: Win (2 points) Loss (0 points) Tie (1 point)

== Playoffs ==
The Toronto Maple Leafs were defeated 4 games to 2 against the Norris Division winning Detroit Red Wings.

== Player statistics ==
=== Regular season ===
Scoring

Player	Pos	GP	G	A	Pts	PIM	+/-	PPG	SHG	GWG
Eddie Olczyk	C	80	42	33	75	55	-22	14	4	3
Gary Leeman	RW	80	30	31	61	62	-6	6	0	0
Mark Osborne	LW	79	23	37	60	102	-3	4	2	0
Al Iafrate	D	77	22	30	52	80	-21	4	3	4
Tom Fergus	C	63	19	31	50	81	5	5	0	0
Russ Courtnall	RW	65	23	26	49	47	-16	6	3	1
Vincent Damphousse	C	75	12	36	48	40	2	1	0	2
Al Secord	LW	74	15	27	42	221	-21	2	0	0
Miroslav Frycer	RW	38	12	20	32	41	8	1	0	2
Peter Ihnacak	C	68	10	20	30	41	-6	0	0	0
Rick Lanz	D	75	6	22	28	65	-12	3	0	0
Borje Salming	D	66	2	24	26	82	7	1	0	0
Todd Gill	D	65	8	17	25	131	-20	1	0	3
Dale DeGray	D	56	6	18	24	63	4	1	0	1
Wendel Clark	LW/D	28	12	11	23	80	-13	4	0	1
Greg Terrion	LW	59	4	16	20	65	-6	1	0	1
Dan Daoust	C	67	9	8	17	57	-7	0	0	1
Sean McKenna	RW	40	5	5	10	12	-11	0	0	1
Luke Richardson	D	78	4	6	10	90	-25	0	0	0
Ken Yaremchuk	C	16	2	5	7	10	-7	0	0	0
Mike Blaisdell	RW	18	3	2	5	2	-5	0	0	1
Dave Semenko	LW	70	2	3	5	107	-8	0	0	0
Ken Wregget	G	56	0	5	5	40	0	0	0	0
Chris Kotsopoulos	D	21	2	2	4	19	-3	0	0	0
Mike Allison	LW	15	0	3	3	10	0	0	0	0
Allan Bester	G	30	0	3	3	6	0	0	0	0
Brian Curran	D	7	0	1	1	19	3	0	0	0
Marty Dallman	C	2	0	1	1	0	1	0	0	0
Ted Fauss	D	13	0	1	1	4	6	0	0	0
Mike Stothers	D	18	0	1	1	42	-6	0	0	0
Leigh Verstraete	RW	3	0	1	1	9	-2	0	0	0
Wes Jarvis	C	1	0	0	0	0	0	0	0	0
Derek Laxdal	RW	5	0	0	0	6	0	0	0	0
Chris McRae	LW	11	0	0	0	65	0	0	0	0
Jeff Reese	G	5	0	0	0	0	0	0	0	0

Goaltending

Player	MIN	GP	W	L	T	GA	GAA	SO	SA	SV	SV%
Ken Wregget	3000	56	12	35	4	222	4.44	2	1712	1490	.870
Allan Bester	1607	30	8	12	5	102	3.81	2	879	777	.884
Jeff Reese	249	5	1	2	1	17	4.10	0	128	111	.867
Team:	4856	80	21	49	10	341	4.21	4	2719	2378	.875

=== Playoffs ===
Scoring

Player	Pos	GP	G	A	Pts	PIM	PPG	SHG	GWG
Eddie Olczyk	C	6	5	4	9	2	1	1	1
Al Iafrate	D	6	3	4	7	6	2	0	0
Tom Fergus	C	6	2	3	5	2	0	1	0
Todd Gill	D	6	1	3	4	20	1	0	0
Mark Osborne	LW	6	1	3	4	16	0	0	1
Borje Salming	D	6	1	3	4	8	0	0	0
Russ Courtnall	RW	6	2	1	3	0	0	0	0
Mike Blaisdell	RW	6	1	2	3	10	0	0	0
Peter Ihnacak	C	5	0	3	3	4	0	0	0
Gary Leeman	RW	2	2	0	2	2	2	0	0
Greg Terrion	LW	5	0	2	2	4	0	0	0
Ken Yaremchuk	C	6	0	2	2	10	0	0	0
Daniel Marois	RW	3	1	0	1	0	0	0	0
Al Secord	LW	6	1	0	1	16	0	0	0
Vincent Damphousse	C	6	0	1	1	10	0	0	0
Dale DeGray	D	5	0	1	1	16	0	0	0
Allan Bester	G	5	0	0	0	0	0	0	0
Brian Curran	D	6	0	0	0	41	0	0	0
Dan Daoust	C	4	0	0	0	2	0	0	0
Miroslav Frycer	RW	3	0	0	0	6	0	0	0
Terry Johnson	D	3	0	0	0	10	0	0	0
Rick Lanz	D	1	0	0	0	2	0	0	0
Sean McKenna	RW	2	0	0	0	0	0	0	0
Luke Richardson	D	2	0	0	0	0	0	0	0
Ken Wregget	G	2	0	0	0	2	0	0	0

Goaltending

Player	MIN	GP	W	L	GA	GAA	SO	SA	SV	SV%
Allan Bester	253	5	2	3	21	4.98	0	135	114	.844
Ken Wregget	108	2	0	1	11	6.11	0	62	51	.823
Team:	360	6	2	4	32	5.32	0	197	165	.838

Note:

Pos = Position;GP = Games played; G = Goals; A = Assists; Pts = Points; PIM = Penalty minutes; +/- = Plus/minus; PPG = Power-play goals; SHG = Short-handed goals; GWG = Game-winning goals
Pos = Position;GP = Games played; Min, TOI = Minutes played; W = Wins; L = Losses; T,T/OT = Ties; OTL = Overtime losses; GA = Goals-against; GAA = Goals-against average; SO = Shutouts; SA = Shots against; SV = Shots saved;SV% = Save percentage;

== Transactions ==
The Maple Leafs have been involved in the following transactions during the 1987–88 season.

=== Trades ===
September 3, 1987	To Chicago Blackhawks Rick Vaive; Steve Thomas; Bob McGill	To Toronto Maple Leafs Al Secord; Eddie Olczyk
September 8, 1987	To Hartford Whalers Bill Root	To Toronto Maple Leafs Dave Semenko
September 17, 1987	To Calgary Flames 5th round pick in 1988 – Scott Matusovich	To Toronto Maple Leafs Dale DeGray
December 14, 1987	To Los Angeles Kings Mike Allison	To Toronto Maple Leafs Sean McKenna
March 8, 1988	To New York Islanders 6th round pick in 1988 – Pavel Gross	To Toronto Maple Leafs Brian Curran
June 10, 1988	To Detroit Red Wings Miroslav Frycer	To Toronto Maple Leafs Darren Veitch

=== Waivers ===
October 5, 1987	To Buffalo Sabres Kevin Maguire

=== Free agents ===
Player	Former team
Mike Blaisdell	Pittsburgh Penguins
Mark Kirton	Vancouver Canucks

== Draft picks ==
Toronto's draft picks at the 1987 NHL entry draft held at the Joe Louis Arena in Detroit, Michigan. The Maple Leafs attempted to select Grant Paranica in the second round of the 1987 NHL supplemental draft, but the claim was ruled invalid since Paranica entered school after age 20 and therefore did not meet eligibility requirements.

Round	#	Player	Nationality	College/Junior/Club team (League)
1	7	Luke Richardson	Canada	Peterborough Petes (OHL)
2	28	Daniel Marois	Canada	Verdun Junior Canadiens (QMJHL)
3	49	John McIntyre	Canada	Guelph Platers (OHL)
4	71	Joe Sacco	United States	Medford High School (USHS-MA)
5	91	Mike Eastwood	Canada	Pembroke Lumber Kings (CJAHL)
6	112	Damian Rhodes	United States	Richfield High School (USHS-MN)
7	133	Trevor Jobe	Canada	Moose Jaw Warriors (WHL)
8	154	Chris Jensen	United States	Northwood School (USHS-NY)
9	175	Brian Blad	Canada	Belleville Bulls (OHL)
10	196	Ron Bernacci	Canada	Hamilton Steelhawks (OHL)
11	217	Ken Alexander	Canada	Hamilton Steelhawks (OHL)
12	238	Alex Weinrich	United States	North Yarmouth Academy (USHS-ME)

== See also ==
- 1987–88 NHL season
