= 1987–88 Montreal Canadiens season =

NHL hockey team season

1987–88 Montreal Canadiens
- Adams Division champions
- Division: 1st Adams
- Conference: 1st Wales
- 1987–88 record: 45–22–13
- Home record: 26–8–6
- Road record: 19–14–7
- Goals for: 298
- Goals against: 238

Team information
- General manager: Serge Savard
- Coach: Jean Perron
- Captain: Bob Gainey
- Alternate captains: Mats Naslund; Larry Robinson
- Arena: Montreal Forum

Team leaders
- Goals: Stephane Richer (50)
- Assists: Bobby Smith (66)
- Points: Bobby Smith (93)
- Penalty minutes: Chris Nilan (209)
- Plus/minus: Petr Svoboda (+46)
- Wins: Patrick Roy (23)
- Goals against average: Brian Hayward (2.86)

The 1987–88 Montreal Canadiens season was the team's 79th season. The club qualified for the playoffs, defeated the Hartford Whalers in the first round, but were eliminated in the Adams Division finals versus the Boston Bruins four games to one.

== Offseason ==
- Canadiens General Manager Serge Savard was part of the four man committee that would select players and coaches for Team Canada at the 1987 Canada Cup. Canadiens head coach Jean Perron would be selected as one of the assistant coaches for Team Canada.

== Regular season ==
Defensively, the Canadiens were the best team in the league, finishing the regular season with just 238 goals against. They also allowed the fewest power-play goals, with just 64

On April 3, Stephane Richer becomes the sixth player in Montreal history to score 50 goals in a season with two in the season finale against Buffalo.

=== Final standings ===
Adams Division
	GP	W	L	T	GF	GA	Pts
**Montreal Canadiens**	80	45	22	13	298	238	103
**Boston Bruins**	80	44	30	6	300	251	94
**Buffalo Sabres**	80	37	32	11	283	305	85
**Hartford Whalers**	80	35	38	7	249	267	77
Quebec Nordiques	80	32	43	5	271	306	69

Note: GP = Games played, W = Wins, L = Losses, T = Ties, Pts = Points, GF = Goals for, GA = Goals against
Note: Teams that qualified for the playoffs are highlighted in bold.

=== Record vs. opponents ===
Adams Division record vs. opponents

==== Vs. Wales Conference ====
**Vs. Adams Division**

1987–88 NHL records
Team	**BOS**	**BUF**	**HFD**	**MTL**	**QUE**	**Total**
Boston	—	4–3–1	4–3–1	3–4–1	5–3	**16–13–3**
Buffalo	3–4–1	—	3–4–1	3–3–2	5–2–1	**14–13–5**
Hartford	3–4–1	4–3–1	—	2–4–2	2–6	**11–17–4**
Montreal	4–3–1	3–3–2	4–2−2	—	6–2	**17–10–5**
Quebec	3–5	2–5–1	6–2	2–6	—	**13–18–1**

**Vs. Patrick Division**

1987–88 NHL records
Team	**NJD**	**NYI**	**NYR**	**PHI**	**PIT**	**WSH**	**Total**
Boston	2–1	1–2	1–2	1–2	2–0–1	1–2	**8–9–1**
Buffalo	2–0–1	1–2	3–0	0–3	0–2–1	2–0–1	**8–7–3**
Hartford	1–1–1	1–2	1–2	1–2	1–2	1–2	**6–11–1**
Montreal	1–2	3–0	1–1–1	1–0–2	1–2	1–1–1	**8–6–4**
Quebec	3–0	1–2	1–2	0–2–1	0–3	1–2	**6–11–1**

==== Vs. Campbell Conference ====
**Vs. Norris Division**

1987–88 NHL records
Team	**CHI**	**DET**	**MIN**	**STL**	**TOR**	**Total**
Boston	3–0	1–2	3–0	1–2	2–1	**10–5–0**
Buffalo	2–1	1–2	1–1–1	3–0	3–0	**10–4–1**
Hartford	2–1	2–1	3–0	1–2	3–0	**11–4–0**
Montreal	2–0–1	2–1	1–1–1	2–1	3–0	**10–3–2**
Quebec	2–0–1	3–0	2–1	1–2	3–0	**11–3–1**

**Vs. Smythe Division**

1987–88 NHL records
Team	**CGY**	**EDM**	**LAK**	**VAN**	**WIN**	**Total**
Boston	2–1	1–1–1	2–0–1	2–1	3–0	**10–3–2**
Buffalo	1–2	0–3	2–1	1–1–1	1–1–1	**5–8–2**
Hartford	0–3	1–2	3–0	1–0–2	2–1	**7–6–2**
Montreal	0–2–1	3–0	2–1	2–0–1	3–0	**10–3–2**
Quebec	0–3	1–1–1	1–2	0–3	0–2–1	**2–11–2**

== Schedule and results ==
1987–88 regular season
October

Game	Result	Date	Score	Opponent	Record
1	T	October 8, 1987	2–2 OT	@ Philadelphia Flyers	0–0–1
2	W	October 10, 1987	6–3	Buffalo Sabres	1–0–1
3	L	October 12, 1987	2–5	Quebec Nordiques	1–1–1
4	L	October 16, 1987	3–4	@ New Jersey Devils	1–2–1
5	W	October 17, 1987	3–2	Pittsburgh Penguins	2–2–1
6	W	October 19, 1987	5–1	Minnesota North Stars	3–2–1
7	W	October 21, 1987	10–3	@ Toronto Maple Leafs	4–2–1
8	L	October 23, 1987	3–5	@ Buffalo Sabres	4–3–1
9	W	October 24, 1987	3–2	@ Washington Capitals	5–3–1
10	L	October 26, 1987	3–5	Calgary Flames	5–4–1
11	W	October 28, 1987	3–1	Edmonton Oilers	6–4–1
12	W	October 30, 1987	5–4	@ Detroit Red Wings	7–4–1
13	T	October 31, 1987	3–3 OT	Boston Bruins	7–4–2

November

Game	Result	Date	Score	Opponent	Record
14	W	November 2, 1987	6–4	St. Louis Blues	8–4–2
15	T	November 4, 1987	4–4 OT	@ Chicago Blackhawks	8–4–3
16	W	November 7, 1987	5–4	Philadelphia Flyers	9–4–3
17	W	November 9, 1987	3–1	Toronto Maple Leafs	10–4–3
18	T	November 11, 1987	0–0 OT	@ Hartford Whalers	10–4–4
19	L	November 12, 1987	2–3	@ Boston Bruins	10–5–4
20	W	November 14, 1987	3–0	Chicago Blackhawks	11–5–4
21	T	November 16, 1987	3–3 OT	Hartford Whalers	11–5–5
22	W	November 18, 1987	5–2	New York Islanders	12–5–5
23	W	November 21, 1987	2–1	New Jersey Devils	13–5–5
24	L	November 23, 1987	3–4 OT	@ Quebec Nordiques	13–6–5
25	W	November 25, 1987	6–5	@ Hartford Whalers	14–6–5
26	L	November 27, 1987	2–4	@ Minnesota North Stars	14–7–5
27	W	November 28, 1987	7–3	@ Winnipeg Jets	15–7–5
28	W	November 30, 1987	6–4	Boston Bruins	16–7–5

December

Game	Result	Date	Score	Opponent	Record
29	T	December 2, 1987	3–3 OT	Vancouver Canucks	16–7–6
30	W	December 5, 1987	6–4	Los Angeles Kings	17–7–6
31	W	December 8, 1987	3–2	@ New York Islanders	18–7–6
32	T	December 9, 1987	2–2 OT	@ New York Rangers	18–7–7
33	W	December 12, 1987	5–3	Detroit Red Wings	19–7–7
34	W	December 16, 1987	5–4	Quebec Nordiques	20–7–7
35	T	December 18, 1987	2–2 OT	@ Buffalo Sabres	20–7–8
36	L	December 19, 1987	1–2	Buffalo Sabres	20–8–8
37	T	December 23, 1987	2–2 OT	Washington Capitals	20–8–9
38	W	December 26, 1987	4–2	@ Toronto Maple Leafs	21–8–9
39	L	December 28, 1987	3–9	@ Calgary Flames	21–9–9
40	W	December 29, 1987	4–1	@ Vancouver Canucks	22–9–9

January

Game	Result	Date	Score	Opponent	Record
41	L	January 2, 1988	2–5	@ Los Angeles Kings	22–10–9
42	L	January 6, 1988	5–6	Buffalo Sabres	22–11–9
43	T	January 9, 1988	3–3 OT	Philadelphia Flyers	22–11–10
44	W	January 13, 1988	5–4	Boston Bruins	23–11–10
45	L	January 14, 1988	2–3	@ Boston Bruins	23–12–10
46	W	January 16, 1988	4–3	New York Rangers	24–12–10
47	W	January 18, 1988	6–4	Edmonton Oilers	25–12–10
48	L	January 21, 1988	1–4	St. Louis Blues	25–13–10
49	L	January 23, 1988	3–4 OT	Pittsburgh Penguins	25–14–10
50	W	January 24, 1988	5–3	@ Quebec Nordiques	26–14–10
51	W	January 27, 1988	4–1	@ Buffalo Sabres	27–14–10
52	L	January 29, 1988	3–4	@ Washington Capitals	27–15–10
53	W	January 30, 1988	6–2	@ New York Islanders	28–15–10

February

Game	Result	Date	Score	Opponent	Record
54	W	February 1, 1988	5–4	Hartford Whalers	29–15–10
55	W	February 3, 1988	5–2	@ Hartford Whalers	30–15–10
56	L	February 4, 1988	3–7	@ Boston Bruins	30–16–10
57	L	February 6, 1988	4–5	Detroit Red Wings	30–17–10
58	L	February 11, 1988	2–4	@ New Jersey Devils	30–18–10
59	L	February 13, 1988	1–4	Hartford Whalers	30–19–10
60	L	February 15, 1988	1–3	@ New York Rangers	30–20–10
61	W	February 17, 1988	3–2	Boston Bruins	31–20–10
62	W	February 20, 1988	5–3	Quebec Nordiques	32–20–10
63	W	February 23, 1988	3–1	@ Quebec Nordiques	33–20–10
64	W	February 24, 1988	5–4	Vancouver Canucks	34–20–10
65	W	February 27, 1988	6–0	Winnipeg Jets	35–20–10
66	W	February 29, 1988	2–1	@ Quebec Nordiques	36–20–10

March

Game	Result	Date	Score	Opponent	Record
67	W	March 3, 1988	4–2	@ St. Louis Blues	37–20–10
68	W	March 5, 1988	7–6 OT	@ Los Angeles Kings	38–20–10
69	W	March 9, 1988	4–1	@ Edmonton Oilers	39–20–10
70	W	March 12, 1988	5–0	Hartford Whalers	40–20–10
71	T	March 14, 1988	2–2 OT	@ Minnesota North Stars	40–20–11
72	W	March 16, 1988	4–1	@ Winnipeg Jets	41–20–11
73	W	March 19, 1988	3–0	Chicago Blackhawks	42–20–11
74	T	March 21, 1988	3–3 OT	Calgary Flames	42–20–12
75	W	March 23, 1988	4–1	Quebec Nordiques	43–20–12
76	L	March 25, 1988	2–5	@ Pittsburgh Penguins	43–21–12
77	L	March 27, 1988	2–4	@ Hartford Whalers	43–22–12
78	W	March 31, 1988	3–1	@ Boston Bruins	44–22–12

April

Game	Result	Date	Score	Opponent	Record
79	W	April 2, 1988	9–4	Buffalo Sabres	45–22–12
80	T	April 3, 1988	4–4 OT	@ Buffalo Sabres	45–22–13

Legend: Win (2 points) Loss (0 points) Tie (1 point)

== Playoffs ==
=== Adams Division semi-finals ===
Hartford Whalers vs. Montreal Canadiens

The Habs almost squandered a 3–0 series lead. The deep Habs roster was the best team in the Wales Conference during the season, consisting of one 50-goal scorer, five 20–goal scorers and another six with between 10 and 20 goals. Their best assets were goaltenders Patrick Roy and backup Brian Hayward who won 23 and 22 games respectively. The Ron Francis-led Whalers went 2–4–2 against the Canadiens during the season, twice losing by just one goal.

Date	Away	Score	Home	Score	Notes
April 6	Hartford	3	Montreal	4	
April 7	Hartford	3	Montreal	7	
April 9	Montreal	4	Hartford	3	
April 10	Montreal	5	Hartford	7	
April 12	Hartford	5	Montreal	3	
April 14	Montreal	4	Hartford	2	

Montreal wins best-of-seven series 4–2

=== Adams Division finals ===
Boston Bruins vs. Montreal Canadiens

The Wales Conference's two best teams, and the NHL's two best defensive teams, met in this series with equal rest time. The Habs had beaten Boston in the Adams Division semi-finals four years in a row, sweeping the Bruins in three of the past four seasons, and beating them 3–2 in a best-of-five the other year. This time, the Bruins' defence would wear down Montreal, as Ken Linseman, Ray Bourque and Cam Neely provided the offence to finally conquer the Canadiens, this despite the fact that the Habs beat them in Game 1 by a score of 5–1. It was the first Bruins' playoff series win over the Habs since the 1942–43 season.

Date	Away	Score	Home	Score	Notes
April 18	Boston	1	Montreal	5	
April 20	Boston	4	Montreal	3	
April 22	Montreal	1	Boston	3	
April 24	Montreal	0	Boston	2	
April 26	Boston	4	Montreal	1	

Boston wins best-of-seven series 4–1

== Player statistics ==
=== Regular season ===
==== Scoring ====
Player	Pos	GP	G	A	Pts	PIM	+/-	PPG	SHG	GWG
Bobby Smith	C	78	27	66	93	78	13	8	0	4
Mats Naslund	LW	78	24	59	83	14	17	4	0	2
Stephane Richer	RW	72	50	28	78	72	12	16	0	11
Claude Lemieux	RW	78	31	30	61	137	16	6	0	3
Chris Chelios	D	71	20	41	61	172	14	10	1	5
Mike McPhee	LW	77	23	20	43	53	19	0	2	4
Larry Robinson	D	53	6	34	40	30	26	2	0	1
Shayne Corson	LW	71	12	27	39	152	22	2	0	2
Guy Carbonneau	C	80	17	21	38	61	14	0	3	1
Ryan Walter	C/LW	61	13	23	36	39	12	6	0	3
Brian Skrudland	C	79	12	24	36	112	14	0	1	3
Petr Svoboda	D	69	7	22	29	149	46	2	0	1
Kjell Dahlin	RW	48	13	12	25	6	5	2	0	2
Bob Gainey	LW	78	11	11	22	14	8	0	0	1
Sergio Momesso	LW	53	7	14	21	101	9	1	0	0
Craig Ludwig	D	74	4	10	14	69	17	0	0	0
Rick Green	D	59	2	11	13	33	21	1	0	0
Chris Nilan	RW	50	7	5	12	209	-2	0	0	1
Gilles Thibaudeau	C	17	5	6	11	0	6	2	0	1
Mike Lalor	D	66	1	10	11	113	4	0	0	0
John Kordic	RW	60	2	6	8	159	0	0	0	0
Larry Trader	D	30	2	4	6	19	2	1	0	0
Serge Boisvert	RW	5	1	1	2	2	0	0	0	0
Jose Charbonneau	RW	16	0	2	2	6	1	0	0	0
Brian Hayward	G	39	0	2	2	24	0	0	0	0
Patrick Roy	G	45	0	2	2	14	0	0	0	0
Perry Ganchar	RW	1	1	0	1	0	-1	0	0	0
Gaston Gingras	D	2	0	1	1	2	1	0	0	0
Scott Sandelin	D	8	0	1	1	2	0	0	0	0
Vincent Riendeau	G	1	0	0	0	0	0	0	0	0
Mathieu Schneider	D	4	0	0	0	2	-1	0	0	0

==== Goaltending ====
Player	MIN	GP	W	L	T	GA	GAA	SO	SA	SV	SV%
Patrick Roy	2586	45	23	12	9	125	2.90	3	1248	1123	.900
Brian Hayward	2247	39	22	10	4	107	2.86	2	1032	925	.896
Vincent Riendeau	36	1	0	0	0	5	8.33	0	22	17	.773
Team:	4869	80	45	22	13	237	2.92	5	2302	2065	.897

=== Playoffs ===
==== Scoring ====
Player	Pos	GP	G	A	Pts	PIM	PPG	SHG	GWG
Stephane Richer	RW	8	7	5	12	6	1	0	2
Mike McPhee	LW	11	4	3	7	8	0	1	0
Bobby Smith	C	11	3	4	7	8	1	0	0
Mats Naslund	LW	6	0	7	7	2	0	0	0
Gilles Thibaudeau	C	8	3	3	6	2	1	0	0
Kjell Dahlin	RW	11	2	4	6	2	0	0	0
Ryan Walter	C/LW	11	2	4	6	6	2	0	1
Brian Skrudland	C	11	1	5	6	24	0	0	0
Claude Lemieux	RW	11	3	2	5	20	0	0	2
Larry Robinson	D	11	1	4	5	4	0	0	0
Petr Svoboda	D	10	0	5	5	12	0	0	0
Chris Chelios	D	11	3	1	4	29	1	0	0
John Kordic	RW	7	2	2	4	26	0	0	0
Guy Carbonneau	C	11	0	4	4	2	0	0	0
Craig Ludwig	D	11	1	1	2	6	0	0	0
Rick Green	D	11	0	2	2	2	0	0	0
Sergio Momesso	LW	6	0	2	2	16	0	0	0
Shayne Corson	LW	3	1	0	1	12	0	0	0
Serge Boisvert	RW	3	0	1	1	2	0	0	0
Bob Gainey	LW	6	0	1	1	6	0	0	0
Jose Charbonneau	RW	8	0	0	0	4	0	0	0
Steven Fletcher	LW/D	1	0	0	0	5	0	0	0
Brian Hayward	G	4	0	0	0	0	0	0	0
Mike Lalor	D	11	0	0	0	11	0	0	0
Patrick Roy	G	8	0	0	0	0	0	0	0

==== Goaltending ====
Player	MIN	GP	W	L	GA	GAA	SO	SA	SV	SV%
Patrick Roy	430	8	3	4	24	3.35	0	218	194	.890
Brian Hayward	230	4	2	2	9	2.35	0	85	76	.894
Team:	660	11	5	6	33	3.00	0	303	270	.891

Note:

Pos = Position;GP = Games played; G = Goals; A = Assists; Pts = Points; PIM = Penalty minutes; +/- = Plus/minus; PPG = Power-play goals; SHG = Short-handed goals; GWG = Game-winning goals
Pos = Position;GP = Games played; Min, TOI = Minutes played; W = Wins; L = Losses; T,T/OT = Ties; OTL = Overtime losses; GA = Goals-against; GAA = Goals-against average; SO = Shutouts; SA = Shots against; SV = Shots saved;SV% = Save percentage;

== Awards and records ==
- Frank J. Selke Trophy: Guy Carbonneau
- Lady Byng Memorial Trophy: Mats Naslund
- William M. Jennings Trophy: Patrick Roy/Brian Hayward
- Patrick Roy, goaltender, NHL Second Team All-Star

== Draft picks ==
Montreal's draft picks at the 1987 NHL entry draft held at the Joe Louis Arena in Detroit, Michigan.

Round	#	Player	Nationality	College/Junior/Club team (League)
1	17	Andrew Cassels	Canada	Ottawa 67's (OHL)
2	33	John LeClair	United States	Bellows Free Academy (USHS-VT)
2	38	Eric Desjardins	Canada	Granby Bisons (QMJHL)
3	44	Mathieu Schneider	United States	Cornwall Royals (OHL)
3	58	Francois Gravel	Canada	Shawinigan Cataractes (QMJHL)
4	80	Kris Miller	United States	Greenway High School (USHS-MN)
5	101	Steve McCool	United States	The Hill School (USHS-PA)
6	122	Les Kuntar	United States	Nichols School (USHS-NY)
7	143	Robert Kelley	United States	Matignon High School (USHS-MA)
8	164	Will Geist	United States	St. Paul Academy and Summit School (USHS-MN)
9	185	Eric Tremblay	Canada	Drummondville Voltigeurs (QMJHL)
10	206	Barry McKinlay	Canada	University of Illinois at Chicago (CCHA)
11	227	Ed Ronan	United States	Phillips Andover Academy (USHS-MA)
12	248	Bryan Herring	United States	Dubuque Fighting Saints (USHL)
S2	18	Wayne Gagne	Canada	Western Michigan University (CCHA)

== See also ==
- 1987–88 NHL season
