= Mario Brunetta =

Canadian ice hockey player

- Born: January 25, 1967 (age 59) Quebec City, Quebec, Canada
- Height: 6 ft 3 in (191 cm)
- Weight: 180 lb (82 kg; 12 st 12 lb)
- Position: Goaltender
- Caught: Left
- Played for: Quebec Nordiques; HC Asiago; HC Devils Milano; HC Varese; Eisbären Berlin; Västra Frölunda HC
- National team: Italy
- NHL draft: 162nd overall, 1985; Quebec Nordiques
- Playing career: 1987–2003

Mario Brunetta (born January 25, 1967) is a Canadian-born Italian former professional ice hockey goaltender. He played 40 games in the National Hockey League with the Quebec Nordiques between 1987 and 1989. The rest of his career, which lasted from 1987 to 2003, was mainly spent in Europe. Internationally Brunetta played for the Italian national team in several tournaments, including the 1998 Winter Olympics and three World Championships.

== Playing career ==
Brunetta was born in Quebec City, Quebec. As a youth, he played in the 1979 and 1980 Quebec International Pee-Wee Hockey Tournaments with a minor ice hockey team from Quebec City.

Brunetta was drafted 162nd overall by the Quebec Nordiques during the 1985 NHL entry draft. Following three years in the Quebec Major Junior Hockey League he was promoted to the Fredericton Express of the AHL. He had a 4-1 start with the Express and was promoted to the Nordiques where he played 29 games that season. During the next two seasons he spent the majority of his time in the AHL and was eventually released. He pursued a career in Europe, playing for teams in Italy, Germany and Sweden.

== Career statistics ==
=== Regular season and playoffs ===
| | | | Regular season | | | | | | | | | Playoffs |
| Season | Team | League | GP | W | L | T | MIN | GA | SO | GAA | SV% | GP | W | L | MIN | GA | SO | GAA | SV% |
|---|---|---|---|---|---|---|---|---|---|---|---|---|---|---|---|---|---|---|---|
| 1982–83 | Sainte-Foy Gouverneurs | QMAAA | 22 | 17 | 4 | 1 | 1316 | 64 | 0 | 2.91 | .902 | 5 | 4 | 1 | 312 | 19 | 0 | 3.65 | — |
| 1983–84 | Sainte-Foy Gouverneurs | QMAAA | 39 | 11 | 23 | 4 | 2169 | 162 | 0 | 4.48 | — | 11 | 8 | 3 | 720 | 45 | 0 | 3.75 | — |
| 1984–85 | Quebec Remparts | QMJHL | 45 | 20 | 21 | 1 | 2255 | 192 | 0 | 5.11 | .857 | 2 | 0 | 2 | 120 | 13 | 0 | 6.50 | .809 |
| 1985–86 | Laval Titan | QMJHL | 63 | 30 | 25 | 1 | 3383 | 279 | 0 | 4.95 | .861 | 14 | 9 | 5 | 834 | 60 | 0 | 4.32 | .884 |
| 1986–87 | Laval Titan | QMJHL | 59 | 27 | 25 | 4 | 3469 | 261 | 1 | 4.51 | .857 | 14 | 8 | 6 | 820 | 63 | 0 | 4.61 | .873 |
| 1987–88 | Quebec Nordiques | NHL | 29 | 10 | 12 | 1 | 1543 | 96 | 0 | 3.73 | .876 | — | — | — | — | — | — | — | — |
| 1987–88 | Fredericton Express | AHL | 5 | 4 | 1 | 0 | 300 | 24 | 0 | 4.80 | .849 | — | — | — | — | — | — | — | — |
| 1988–89 | Quebec Nordiques | NHL | 5 | 1 | 3 | 0 | 227 | 19 | 0 | 5.04 | .836 | — | — | — | — | — | — | — | — |
| 1988–89 | Halifax Citadels | AHL | 36 | 14 | 14 | 5 | 1898 | 124 | 0 | 3.92 | .878 | 3 | 0 | 2 | 142 | 12 | 0 | 5.07 | — |
| 1989–90 | Quebec Nordiques | NHL | 6 | 1 | 2 | 0 | 192 | 13 | 0 | 4.08 | .869 | — | — | — | — | — | — | — | — |
| 1989–90 | Halifax Citadels | AHL | 24 | 8 | 14 | 2 | 1444 | 99 | 0 | 4.11 | .869 | — | — | — | — | — | — | — | — |
| 1990–91 | HC Asiago | ITA | 42 | — | — | — | 2446 | 160 | 3 | 3.92 | — | — | — | — | — | — | — | — | — |
| 1991–92 | HC Asiago | ITA | 29 | — | — | — | 1746 | 116 | 1 | 3.98 | — | 11 | — | — | 668 | 43 | 1 | 3.86 | — |
| 1992–93 | HC Asiago | ITA | 22 | — | — | — | 1320 | 94 | — | 4.27 | — | — | — | — | — | — | — | — | — |
| 1993–94 | HC Devils Milano | ITA | 29 | — | — | — | 1551 | 81 | — | 3.13 | — | — | — | — | — | — | — | — | — |
| 1994–95 | HC Devils Milano | ITA | 30 | — | — | — | — | — | — | 4.21 | .872 | 2 | — | — | — | — | — | 4.20 | .873 |
| 1995–96 | HC Varese | ITA | 40 | — | — | — | 1555 | 69 | — | 2.66 | .914 | 8 | — | — | — | — | — | 2.66 | .908 |
| 1996–97 | Eisbären Berlin | DEL | 46 | — | — | — | 2729 | 144 | 0 | 3.17 | .882 | 8 | — | — | 493 | 24 | 1 | 2.92 | .891 |
| 1997–98 | Eisbären Berlin | DEL | 40 | — | — | — | 2277 | 101 | 2 | 2.66 | .906 | 10 | 7 | 3 | 607 | 29 | 1 | 3.00 | .911 |
| 1998–99 | Eisbären Berlin | DEL | 25 | — | — | — | 1296 | 77 | 0 | 3.56 | .886 | — | — | — | — | — | — | — | — |
| 1999–00 | Västra Frölunda HC | SWE | 28 | — | — | — | 1620 | 71 | 3 | 2.63 | .904 | — | — | — | — | — | — | — | — |
| 2000–01 | ERC Ingolstadt | GER-2 | 37 | — | — | — | 2230 | 71 | 6 | 1.91 | — | 12 | — | — | 720 | 16 | 4 | 1.33 | — |
| 2001–02 | ERC Ingolstadt | GER-2 | 49 | — | — | — | 2961 | 82 | 1 | 1.67 | — | 11 | — | — | 691 | 17 | 0 | 1.48 | — |
| 2002–03 | Quebec Aces | QSPHL | 10 | — | — | — | — | — | — | 4.53 | .891 | — | — | — | — | — | — | — | — |
| 2002–03 | Levis Canonniers | QSCHL | 7 | — | — | — | — | — | — | 4.51 | .857 | — | — | — | — | — | — | — | — |
| NHL totals | | | 40 | 12 | 17 | 1 | 1961 | 128 | 0 | 3.92 | .871 | — | — | — | — | — | — | — | — |

=== International ===
| Year | Team | Event | GP | W | L | T | MIN | GA | SO | GAA | SV% |
|---|---|---|---|---|---|---|---|---|---|---|---|
| 1995 | Italy | WC | 4 | 1 | 2 | 1 | 167 | 13 | 0 | 4.67 | .899 |
| 1998 | Italy | OLY | 1 | 0 | 1 | 0 | 23 | 4 | 0 | 10.17 | .500 |
| 1998 | Italy | WC | 1 | 0 | 1 | 0 | 60 | 5 | 0 | 5.00 | .868 |
| 2002 | Italy | WC | 3 | — | — | — | 100 | 9 | 0 | 5.40 | .836 |
| Senior totals | | | 9 | — | — | — | 350 | 31 | 0 | 5.31 | — |
