= Terry Carkner =

Canadian ice hockey player and coach

- Born: March 7, 1966 (age 60) Smiths Falls, Ontario, Canada
- Height: 6 ft 3 in (191 cm)
- Weight: 210 lb (95 kg; 15 st 0 lb)
- Position: Defence
- Shot: Left
- Played for: New York Rangers; Quebec Nordiques; Philadelphia Flyers; Detroit Red Wings; Florida Panthers
- National team: Canada
- NHL draft: 14th overall, 1984; New York Rangers
- Playing career: 1986–1999

Terry Kenneth Carkner (born March 7, 1966) is a Canadian former professional ice hockey defenceman who played 13 seasons in the National Hockey League (NHL) with the New York Rangers, Quebec Nordiques, Philadelphia Flyers, Detroit Red Wings and Florida Panthers. He was selected fourteenth overall in the 1984 NHL entry draft. Carkner was born in Smiths Falls, Ontario, but grew up in Winchester, Ontario. Carkner was a fearless, tough defensive defenseman. He got over 100 penalty minutes 8 times in his NHL career.

Carkner was the head coach of the club ice hockey team for Villanova University, the Icecats, for the 2004–05 season. The Villanova team is a member of the ACHA (American Collegiate Hockey Association) Division 1 and the ECHA (Eastern Collegiate Hockey Association). He is currently (09–10) an assistant coach for the Great Valley Ice Hockey Varsity Team.

Carkner is an honorary member of the Nordmont (Pennsylvania) Sport & Social Club.

== Playing career ==
Carkner played major-junior for the Peterborough Petes, an Ontario Hockey League team based in Peterborough, Ontario. He played 184 games for that club, amassing 130 points (0.71 points per game) and 322 penalty minutes. He would also play for team Canada in the 1986 World Junior Hockey Championships, where he won a silver medal.

In the 1984 NHL entry draft, Carkner was chosen 14th overall by the New York Rangers. In that draft, the NHL Central Scouting bureau ranked him as the 17th best prospect, while the Hockey News ranked him 11th.

He would play one season with the Rangers, sharing time between them and the New Haven Nighthawks, their AHL affiliate. Before the start of the 1987–88 season, he was traded to the Quebec Nordiques with Jeff Jackson for John Ogrodnick and David Shaw.

Carkner would play the entire 1987–88 season for Quebec, getting 27 points and 159 penalty minutes in 63 games. Once again, before the start of the next season, he was traded to the Philadelphia Flyers for Greg Smyth and a draft pick.

With the Flyers, Carkner would play 5 seasons, getting 376 games, 132 points (0.35 points per game), and 867 penalty minutes. In 1989, the Flyers named him an alternate captain. He was later traded to the Detroit Red Wings for Yves Racine and a draft pick. After playing two years in Detroit, he signed as a free agent for the Florida Panthers on a two-year, 1.2 million dollar deal. He would finish his NHL career in Florida after four seasons with the Panthers.

In total, Carkner played 858 games in the NHL, amassing 230 points (0,27 points per game) and 1588 penalty minutes.

== Personal ==
Carkner's father, Robert Carkner, was a major junior hockey player in his youth. He is a third cousin of former NHL defenceman Matt Carkner. He is also active with the hockey club ShinnyUSA.(Rink 4)

== Career statistics ==
=== Regular season and playoffs ===
			Regular season					Playoffs
Season	Team	League	GP	G	A	Pts	PIM	GP	G	A	Pts	PIM
1980–81	Winchester Hawks	EOJHL	2	0	0	0	0	—	—	—	—	—
1981–82	Smith Falls Settlers	NDJHL	—	—	—	—	—	—	—	—	—	—
1982–83	Brockville Braves	CJHL	47	8	32	40	94	—	—	—	—	—
1983–84	Peterborough Petes	OHL	66	4	21	25	91	8	0	6	6	13
1984–85	Peterborough Petes	OHL	64	14	47	61	125	17	2	10	12	11
1985–86	Peterborough Petes	OHL	54	12	32	44	106	16	1	7	8	17
1986–87	New York Rangers	NHL	52	2	13	15	118	1	0	0	0	0
1986–87	New Haven Nighthawks	AHL	12	2	6	8	56	3	1	0	1	0
1987–88	Quebec Nordiques	NHL	63	3	24	27	159	—	—	—	—	—
1988–89	Philadelphia Flyers	NHL	78	11	32	43	149	19	1	5	6	28
1989–90	Philadelphia Flyers	NHL	63	4	18	22	169	—	—	—	—	—
1990–91	Philadelphia Flyers	NHL	79	7	25	32	204	—	—	—	—	—
1991–92	Philadelphia Flyers	NHL	73	4	12	16	195	—	—	—	—	—
1992–93	Philadelphia Flyers	NHL	83	3	16	19	150	—	—	—	—	—
1993–94	Detroit Red Wings	NHL	68	1	6	7	130	7	0	0	0	4
1994–95	Detroit Red Wings	NHL	20	1	2	3	21	—	—	—	—	—
1995–96	Florida Panthers	NHL	73	3	10	13	80	22	0	4	4	10
1996–97	Florida Panthers	NHL	70	0	14	14	96	5	0	0	0	6
1997–98	Florida Panthers	NHL	74	1	7	8	63	—	—	—	—	—
1998–99	Florida Panthers	NHL	62	2	9	11	54	—	—	—	—	—
NHL totals			858	42	188	230	1588	54	1	9	10	48

=== International ===
Year	Team	Event	Result	GP	G	A	Pts	PIM
1986	Canada	WJC	2nd place, silver medalist(s)	7	0	4	4	0
1993	Canada	WC	4th	8	0	0	0	0
Junior totals				7	0	4	4	0
Senior totals				8	0	0	0	0

== Awards and honours ==
Award	Year
OHL
Second All Star Team	1985
First All Star Team	1986
Max Kaminsky Trophy	1986

Awards and achievements
Preceded by Dave Gagner	New York Rangers first-round draft pick 1984	Succeeded by Ulf Dahlén
