= Trevor Stienburg =

Canadian ice hockey player

- Born: May 13, 1966 (age 59) Kingston, Ontario, Canada
- Height: 6 ft 1 in (185 cm)
- Weight: 200 lb (91 kg; 14 st 4 lb)
- Position: Right wing
- Shot: Right
- Played for: Quebec Nordiques
- NHL draft: 15th overall, 1984; Quebec Nordiques
- Playing career: 1985–1994

Trevor Malcolm Stienburg (born May 13, 1966) is a Canadian former professional ice hockey right winger. He was drafted in the first round, 15th overall, by the Quebec Nordiques in the 1984 NHL entry draft. He played seventy-one regular-season games and one playoff game in the National Hockey League, all with the Nordiques.

He went on to coach the Saint Mary's Huskies who play in the Atlantic University Hockey Conference in Canada for 23 years, stepping down in June of 2020. He coached the team to AUS titles in 2002 and 2009 and to a University Cup title in Thunder Bay, Ontario on March 28, 2010. He was named the U Sports Coach of the Year three times, including back to back in 1998-99 and 1999-2000. He remains the only coach ever to achieve this feat.

Since retiring from coaching, Stienburg has joined the Seattle Kraken as an amateur scout.

Stienburg was born in Kingston, Ontario.

== Career statistics ==
			Regular season					Playoffs
Season	Team	League	GP	G	A	Pts	PIM	GP	G	A	Pts	PIM
1982–83	Brockville Braves	CJHL	48	39	30	69	182	—	—	—	—	—
1983–84	Guelph Platers	OHL	65	33	18	51	104	—	—	—	—	—
1984–85	Guelph Platers	OHL	18	7	12	19	38	—	—	—	—	—
1984–85	London Knights	OHL	22	9	11	20	45	8	1	3	4	22
1984–85	Fredericton Express	AHL	—	—	—	—	—	2	0	0	0	0
1985–86	London Knights	OHL	31	12	18	30	88	5	0	0	0	20
1985–86	Quebec Nordiques	NHL	2	1	0	1	0	1	0	0	0	0
1986–87	Fredericton Express	AHL	48	14	12	26	123	—	—	—	—	—
1986–87	Quebec Nordiques	NHL	6	1	0	1	12	—	—	—	—	—
1987–88	Fredericton Express	AHL	55	12	24	36	279	13	3	3	6	115
1987–88	Quebec Nordiques	NHL	8	0	1	1	24	—	—	—	—	—
1988–89	Quebec Nordiques	NHL	55	6	3	9	130	—	—	—	—	—
1989–90	Halifax Citadels	AHL	11	3	3	6	36	—	—	—	—	—
1990–91	Halifax Citadels	AHL	41	16	7	23	190	—	—	—	—	—
1991–92	New Haven Nighthawks	AHL	66	17	22	39	201	1	0	0	0	2
1992–93	Springfield Indians	AHL	65	14	20	34	244	10	0	0	0	31
1993–94	Springfield Indians	AHL	47	4	10	14	134	—	—	—	—	—
NHL totals			71	8	4	12	166	1	0	0	0	0
AHL totals			333	80	98	178	1207	26	3	3	6	148

Preceded by Kirk Muller	Jack Ferguson Award; 1983	Succeeded by Dave Moylan
Preceded by David Shaw	Quebec Nordiques first-round draft pick 1984	Succeeded by David Latta
