= Adams Division =

National Hockey League division (1974–1993)

- Conference: Wales Conference
- League: National Hockey League
- Sport: Ice hockey
- Founded: 1974
- Folded: 1993
- Replaced by: Northeast Division
- Most titles: Boston Bruins (9)

The National Hockey League's Adams Division was formed in 1974 as part of the Prince of Wales Conference. The division existed for 19 seasons until 1993. It was named after Charles Francis Adams, the founder of the Boston Bruins. It is the forerunner of the NHL's Northeast Division, which later became the Atlantic Division.

== Division lineups ==
=== 1974–1976 ===
1974–76 Adams Division Teams
- Boston Bruins
- Buffalo Sabres
- California Golden Seals
- Toronto Maple Leafs

==== Changes from the 1973–74 season ====
- The Adams Division is formed as a result of NHL realignment
- The Boston Bruins, Buffalo Sabres, and Toronto Maple Leafs come from the East Division
- The California Golden Seals come from the West Division

=== 1976–1978 ===
1976–78 Adams Division Teams
- Boston Bruins
- Buffalo Sabres
- Cleveland Barons
- Toronto Maple Leafs

==== Changes from the 1975–76 season ====
- The California Golden Seals moved to Richfield, Ohio, to become the Cleveland Barons

=== 1978–1979 ===
1978–79 Adams Division Teams
- Boston Bruins
- Buffalo Sabres
- Minnesota North Stars
- Toronto Maple Leafs

==== Changes from the 1977–78 season ====
- The Cleveland Barons merge with the Minnesota North Stars. The merged franchise continues as the Minnesota North Stars, but leaves the Smythe Division to assume the Barons' place in the Adams Division to prevent the Adams from dropping to only three teams.

=== 1979–1981 ===
1979–81 Adams Division Teams
- Boston Bruins
- Buffalo Sabres
- Minnesota North Stars
- Quebec Nordiques
- Toronto Maple Leafs

==== Changes from the 1978–79 season ====
- The Quebec Nordiques are granted entry into the NHL from the World Hockey Association (WHA)

=== 1981–1992 ===
1981–92 Adams Division Teams
- Boston Bruins
- Buffalo Sabres
- Hartford Whalers
- Montreal Canadiens
- Quebec Nordiques

==== Changes from the 1980–81 season ====
- The Minnesota North Stars and Toronto Maple Leafs move to the Norris Division
- The Hartford Whalers and Montreal Canadiens come from the Norris Division

=== 1992–1993 ===
1992–93 Adams Division Teams
- Boston Bruins
- Buffalo Sabres
- Hartford Whalers
- Montreal Canadiens
- Ottawa Senators
- Quebec Nordiques

==== Changes from the 1991–92 season ====
- The Ottawa Senators are added as an expansion team

=== After the 1992–93 season ===
The league was reformatted into two conferences with two divisions each:

- Eastern Conference
  - Atlantic Division
  - Northeast Division
- Western Conference
  - Central Division
  - Pacific Division

== Season results ==
^{(#)}	Denotes team that won the Stanley Cup
^{(#)}	Denotes team that lost Stanley Cup Final (and since 1981–82 won the Prince of Wales Trophy)
^{(#)}	Denotes team that qualified for the Stanley Cup playoffs
‡	Denotes team with most points in the regular season (winner of the Presidents' Trophy since 1985–86)

Season	1st	2nd	3rd	4th	5th	6th
1974–75	^{(DC)} Buffalo (113)	^{(2)} Boston (94)	^{(8)} Toronto (78)	California (51)		
1975–76	^{(DC)} Boston (113)	^{(1)} Buffalo (105)	^{(4)} Toronto (83)	California (65)		
1976–77	^{(DC)} Boston (106)	^{(2)} Buffalo (104)	^{(5)} Toronto (81)	Cleveland (63)		
1977–78	^{(DC)} Boston (113)	^{(2)} Buffalo (105)	^{(3)} Toronto (92)	Cleveland (57)		
1978–79	^{(DC)} Boston (100)	^{(4)} Buffalo (88)	^{(6)} Toronto (81)	Minnesota (68)		
1979–80	^{(2)} Buffalo (110)	^{(4)} Boston (105)	^{(6)} Minnesota (88)	^{(11)} Toronto (75)	Quebec (61)	
1980–81	^{(5)} Buffalo (99)	^{(8)} Boston (87)	^{(9)} Minnesota (87)	^{(11)} Quebec (78)	^{(16)} Toronto (71)	
1981–82	Montreal (109)	Boston (96)	Buffalo (93)	Quebec (82)	Hartford (60)	
1982–83	Boston (110)^{‡}	Montreal (98)	Buffalo (89)	Quebec (80)	Hartford (45)	
1983–84	Boston (104)	Buffalo (103)	Quebec (94)	Montreal (75)	Hartford (66)	
1984–85	Montreal (94)	Quebec (91)	Buffalo (90)	Boston (82)	Hartford (69)	
1985–86	Quebec (92)	Montreal (87)	Boston (86)	Hartford (84)	Buffalo (80)	
1986–87	Hartford (93)	Montreal (92)	Boston (85)	Quebec (72)	Buffalo (64)	
1987–88	Montreal (103)	Boston (94)	Buffalo (85)	Hartford (77)	Quebec (69)	
1988–89	Montreal (115)	Boston (88)	Buffalo (83)	Hartford (79)	Quebec (61)	
1989–90	Boston (101)^{‡}	Buffalo (98)	Montreal (93)	Hartford (85)	Quebec (31)	
1990–91	Boston (100)	Montreal (89)	Buffalo (81)	Hartford (73)	Quebec (46)	
1991–92	Montreal (93)	Boston (84)	Buffalo (74)	Hartford (65)	Quebec (52)	
1992–93	Boston (109)	Quebec (104)	Montreal (102)	Buffalo (86)	Hartford (58)	Ottawa (24)

== Adams Division titles won by team ==
Team	Wins	Last win
Boston Bruins	9	1993
Montreal Canadiens	5	1992
Buffalo Sabres	3	1981
Hartford Whalers	1	1987
Quebec Nordiques	1	1986
California Golden Seals/Cleveland Barons	0	—
Minnesota North Stars	0	—
Ottawa Senators	0	—
Toronto Maple Leafs	0	—
