= 1990 Stanley Cup Final =

1990 ice hockey championship series

	1	2	3	4	5	Total
Edmonton Oilers	3***	7	1	5	4	4
Boston Bruins	2***	2	2	1	1	1
- * – Denotes overtime period(s)
- Location(s): Boston: Boston Garden (1, 2, 5); Edmonton: Northlands Coliseum (3, 4)
- Coaches: Edmonton: John Muckler; Boston: Mike Milbury
- Captains: Edmonton: Mark Messier; Boston: Ray Bourque
- Referees: Don Koharski (1, 4); Andy Van Hellemond (3, 5); Kerry Fraser (2)
- Dates: May 15–24, 1990
- MVP: Bill Ranford (Oilers)
- Series-winning goal: Craig Simpson (9:31, second)
- Hall of Famers: Oilers: Glenn Anderson (2008); Grant Fuhr (2003; did not play); Jari Kurri (2001); Kevin Lowe (2020); Mark Messier (2007); Bruins: Ray Bourque (2004); Cam Neely (2005); Officials: Ray Scapinello (2008); Andy Van Hellemond (1999)
- Networks: Canada: (English): CBC (French): SRC; United States: (National): SportsChannel America (Boston area): NESN (1–2, 5), WSBK (3–4)
- Announcers: (CBC) Bob Cole and Harry Neale (SRC) Richard Garneau and Gilles Tremblay (SportsChannel America) Jiggs McDonald and Bill Clement (NESN) Fred Cusick, Derek Sanderson, and Dave Shea (WSBK) Fred Cusick and Derek Sanderson

The 1990 Stanley Cup Final was the championship series of the National Hockey League's (NHL) 1989–90 season, and the culmination of the 1990 Stanley Cup playoffs. It was contested by the Edmonton Oilers and the Boston Bruins. This was a rematch of the 1988 Finals, albeit with the notable absence of Wayne Gretzky who was traded from Edmonton to the Los Angeles Kings during the 1988 off-season. The Oilers once again defeated the Bruins, this time in five games, to win the Stanley Cup.

For the Oilers, it was their fifth Cup win in seven years, and the team's only championship after trading Gretzky. This was the last of eight consecutive Finals contested by a team from Alberta and nine by a team from Western Canada (the Oilers appeared in six, the Calgary Flames in two, the Vancouver Canucks in one).

This was the last appearance in the Finals for the Bruins until 2011, where they would go on to end their 39-year Stanley Cup drought.

== Paths to the Finals ==
Boston defeated the Hartford Whalers 4–3, the Montreal Canadiens 4–1 and the Washington Capitals 4–0 to advance to the Final.

Edmonton defeated the Winnipeg Jets 4–3, the Los Angeles Kings 4–0 and the Chicago Blackhawks 4–2.

== Game summaries ==
Though the Oilers ultimately won the series in five games, it was the Bruins who dominated play during the early part of the series. The Bruins had more chances to win the opener, and at one point had a 15-4 shot advantage in game two before the Oilers came back.

=== Game one ===
May 15	Edmonton Oilers	3–2	3OT	Boston Bruins	Boston Garden	Recap

In Game 1, Petr Klima scored at 15:13 of the third overtime period to give the Oilers a 3–2 win; this game remains the longest in Stanley Cup Final history (see Longest NHL overtime games), edging both Brett Hull's Cup-winner in 1999 and Igor Larionov's game-winner in 2002 by less than 30 seconds.

Scoring summary
Period	Team	Goal	Assist(s)	Time	Score
1st	EDM	Adam Graves (4)	Joe Murphy (7) and Craig Simpson (12)	09:46	1–0 EDM
2nd	EDM	Glenn Anderson (7)	Mark Messier (18) and Reijo Ruotsalainen (10)	13:00	2–0 EDM
3rd	BOS	Ray Bourque (3)	Cam Neely (13) and Greg Hawgood (2)	03:43	2–1 EDM
3rd	BOS	Ray Bourque (4)	Cam Neely (14) and Greg Hawgood (3)	18:31	2–2
OT	None				
2OT	None				
3OT	EDM	Petr Klima (5)	Jari Kurri (11) and Craig MacTavish (5)	15:13	3–2 EDM
Penalty summary
Period	Team	Player	Penalty	Time	PIM
1st	EDM	Glenn Anderson	Cross-checking	03:05	2:00
1st	BOS	Cam Neely	Interference	04:41	2:00
1st	EDM	Mark Messier	Tripping	12:24	2:00
1st	BOS	John Carter	Roughing	15:53	2:00
2nd	EDM	Esa Tikkanen	Holding	09:44	2:00
2nd	EDM	Charlie Huddy	Hooking	14:38	2:00
3rd	None				
OT	None				
2OT	None				
3OT	BOS	Cam Neely	Roughing	02:41	2:00
3OT	EDM	Steve Smith	Roughing	02:41	2:00
3OT	BOS	Andy Moog	Slashing	13:48	2:00
3OT	BOS	Esa Tikkanen	Slashing	13:48	2:00

Shots by period
Team	1	2	3	OT	2OT	3OT	Total
Edmonton	6	4	6	7	5	3	31
Boston	10	6	15	6	7	8	52

=== Game two ===
May 18	Edmonton Oilers	7–2	Boston Bruins	Boston Garden	Recap

Scoring summary
Period	Team	Goal	Assist(s)	Time	Score
1st	EDM	Adam Graves (5)	Joe Murphy (8) and Randy Gregg (6)	08:38	1–0 EDM
1st	EDM	Jari Kurri (8) – pp	Esa Tikkanen (10)	10:53	2–0 EDM
1st	BOS	Ray Bourque (5)	Cam Neely (15)	19:07	2–1 EDM
2nd	BOS	Greg Hawgood (1) – pp	Ray Bourque (11) and Randy Burridge (10)	02:56	2–2
2nd	EDM	Jari Kurri (9)	Esa Tikkanen (11)	04:21	3–2 EDM
2nd	EDM	Craig Simpson (13)	Jari Kurri (12)	15:28	4–2 EDM
2nd	EDM	Esa Tikkanen (11)	Jari Kurri (13)	17:10	5–2 EDM
2nd	EDM	Joe Murphy (5)	Steve Smith (9)	19:12	6–2 EDM
3rd	EDM	Jari Kurri (10) – pp	Reijo Ruotsalainen (11) and Mark Lamb (9)	07:27	7–2 EDM
Penalty summary
Period	Team	Player	Penalty	Time	PIM
1st	EDM	Mark Messier	Roughing	00:49	2:00
1st	EDM	Glenn Anderson	Tripping	04:45	2:00
1st	BOS	John Carter	High-sticking – major	06:20	5:00
1st	BOS	John Carter	Game misconduct	06:20	10:00
1st	EDM	Steve Smith	Hooking	06:45	2:00
1st	BOS	Don Sweeney	Elbowing	12:55	2:00
1st	EDM	Kelly Buchberger	Unsportmanslike conduct	12:55	2:00
1st	EDM	Mark Lamb	Tripping	14:56	2:00
2nd	EDM	Esa Tikkanen	Holding	01:14	2:00
2nd	BOS	Cam Neely	Roughing	02:27	2:00
2nd	EDM	Steve Smith	Roughing	02:27	2:00
2nd	BOS	Greg Hawgood	Roughing	11:00	2:00
2nd	EDM	Esa Tikkanen	Roughing	11:00	2:00
2nd	EDM	Bill Ranford	Delay of game	11:14	2:00
2nd	BOS	Rejean Lemelin	Throwing stick	19:00	Penalty shot
3rd	BOS	Bob Sweeney	Holding	05:30	2:00
3rd	BOS	Greg Johnston	Roughing – double minor	12:50	4:00
3rd	EDM	Joe Murphy	Roughing	12:50	2:00
3rd	EDM	Joe Murphy	Unsportsmanlike conduct	12:50	2:00

Shots by period
Team	1	2	3	Total
Edmonton	2	9	11	22
Boston	10	12	5	27

=== Game three ===
May 20	Boston Bruins	2–1	Edmonton Oilers	Northlands Coliseum	Recap

Scoring summary
Period	Team	Goal	Assist(s)	Time	Score
1st	BOS	John Byce (2)	Cam Neely (16)	00:10	1–0 BOS
1st	BOS	Greg Johnston (1)	Randy Burridge (11) and Bob Sweeney (2)	15:04	2–0 BOS
2nd	None				
3rd	EDM	Esa Tikkanen (12) – pp	Jari Kurri (14) and Steve Smith (10)	05:54	2–1 BOS
Penalty summary
Period	Team	Player	Penalty	Time	PIM
1st	BOS	Don Sweeney	Holding	03:16	2:00
1st	EDM	Martin Gelinas	Hooking	06:32	2:00
1st	EDM	Craig MacTavish	Tripping	06:20	2:00
1st	EDM	Jari Kurri	Interference	17:17	2:00
2nd	EDM	Craig Simpson	Interference	12:28	2:00
2nd	BOS	Allen Pedersen	Holding	15:37	2:00
3rd	BOS	Don Sweeney	Holding	01:30	2:00
3rd	BOS	Garry Galley	Holding	05:32	2:00
3rd	BOS	Ray Bourque	Holding	06:01	2:00
3rd	EDM	Steve Smith	Interference	06:23	2:00

Shots by period
Team	1	2	3	Total
Boston	13	7	2	22
Edmonton	11	4	14	29

=== Game four ===
May 22	Boston Bruins	1–5	Edmonton Oilers	Northlands Coliseum	Recap

Scoring summary
Period	Team	Goal	Assist(s)	Time	Score
1st	EDM	Glenn Anderson (8) – pp	Craig Simpson (13) and Mark Lamb (10)	02:13	1–0 EDM
1st	EDM	Glenn Anderson (9)	Mark Messier (19) and Craig Simpson (14)	16:27	2–0 EDM
2nd	EDM	Craig Simpson (14)	Mark Messier (20) and Glenn Anderson (10)	01:00	3–0 EDM
2nd	EDM	Esa Tikkanen (13)	Jari Kurri (15) and Craig MacTavish (6)	19:15	4–0 EDM
3rd	BOS	John Carter (6)	Unassisted	15:02	4–1 EDM
3rd	EDM	Craig Simpson (15)	Glenn Anderson (11) and Mark Messier (21)	18:36	5–1 EDM
Penalty summary
Period	Team	Player	Penalty	Time	PIM
1st	BOS	Bobby Carpenter	Interference	00:24	2:00
1st	BOS	Cam Neely	Roughing	03:16	2:00
1st	EDM	Craig Muni	Roughing	03:16	2:00
1st	EDM	Mark Messier	Boarding	13:33	2:00
1st	BOS	John Carter	Unsportsmanlike conduct	16:11	2:00
1st	EDM	Reijo Ruotsalainen	Unsportsmanlike conduct	16:11	2:00
1st	EDM	Greg Hawgood	Slashing	18:52	2:00
2nd	BOS	Glen Wesley	Hooking	06:20	2:00
2nd	EDM	Craig Simpson	Tripping	12:39	2:00
2nd	EDM	Glenn Anderson	Roughing	19:50	2:00
3rd	EDM	Craig Simpson	Interference	05:04	2:00
3rd	BOS	Randy Burridge	Slashing	12:14	2:00
3rd	BOS	Cam Neely	High-sticking	15:14	2:00
3rd	BOS	Bob Sweeney	Fighting – major	17:06	5:00
3rd	EDM	Steve Smith	Fighting – major	17:06	5:00

Shots by period
Team	1	2	3	Total
Boston	7	11	7	25
Edmonton	12	10	11	33

=== Game five ===
May 24	Edmonton Oilers	4–1	Boston Bruins	Boston Garden	Recap

In Game 5 at the Boston Garden on May 24, the Oilers won 4–1, the first time they had ever clinched the Cup on the road. Edmonton won all three Finals games played at Boston Garden - in each their previous Finals wins, the Oilers only won one game away from Northlands Coliseum. Craig Simpson scored the game-winning goal. Oilers goaltender Bill Ranford, originally the backup who took over from Grant Fuhr for the remainder of the regular season and the entire playoffs, was awarded the Conn Smythe Trophy as playoff MVP. Game 5 was the last Stanley Cup Final game ever played at the Boston Garden.

Mark Messier won his first Stanley Cup as a team captain, and his fifth overall. He won his sixth Stanley Cup as the captain with the New York Rangers four years later, and scored the Cup-winning goal, making him the only player to captain two different Cup-winning teams.

Bruins defenseman Ray Bourque did not reach the Stanley Cup Final again until the Colorado Avalanche won in 2001. As for the Bruins, they would not return to the Stanley Cup Final until their championship season of 2011. The Oilers did not reach the Finals again until 2006, losing in seven games.

Scoring summary
Period	Team	Goal	Assist(s)	Time	Score
1st	None				
2nd	EDM	Glenn Anderson (10)	Unassisted	01:17	1–0 EDM
2nd	EDM	Craig Simpson (16)	Glenn Anderson (12)	09:31	2–0 EDM
3rd	EDM	Steve Smith (5)	Mark Messier (22) and Craig Simpson (15)	06:09	3–0 EDM
3rd	EDM	Joe Murphy (6)	Mark Lamb (11) and Martin Gelinas (3)	14:53	4–0 EDM
3rd	BOS	Lyndon Byers (1)	Don Sweeney (5) and Ray Bourque (12)	16:30	4–1 EDM
Penalty summary
Period	Team	Player	Penalty	Time	PIM
1st	BOS	Ray Bourque	Cross-checking	02:56	2:00
1st	EDM	Esa Tikkanen	Holding	04:32	2:00
1st	BOS	Garry Galley	Holding	04:45	2:00
2nd	None				
3rd	EDM	Charlie Huddy	Hooking	07:09	2:00
3rd	BOS	Ray Bourque	Holding	11:46	2:00

Shots by period
Team	1	2	3	Total
Edmonton	10	5	7	22
Boston	10	10	10	30

== Team rosters ==
Years indicated in boldface under the "Finals appearance" column signify that the player won the Stanley Cup in the given year.

=== Boston Bruins ===
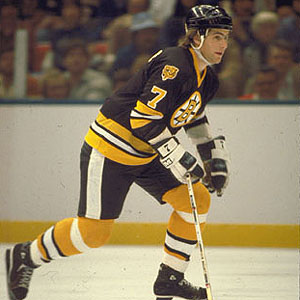
Ray Bourque (pictured in 1981) captained the Bruins to their second Final appearance in the past three years.

#	Nat	Player	Position	Hand	Age	Acquired	Place of birth	Finals appearance
43	(United States)	Bob Beers	D	R	23	1985	Pittsburgh, Pennsylvania	first
77	(Canada)	Ray Bourque – **C**	D	L	29	1979	Saint-Laurent, Quebec	second (1988)
25	(United States)	Andy Brickley	LW	L	28	1988–89	Melrose, Massachusetts	first
12	(Canada)	Randy Burridge	LW	L	24	1985	Fort Erie, Ontario	second (1988)
42	(United States)	John Byce	C	L	22	1985	Madison, Wisconsin	first
34	(Canada)	Lyndon Byers	RW	R	26	1982	Nipawin, Saskatchewan	second (1988)
11	(United States)	Bobby Carpenter	C	L	26	1988–89	Beverly, Massachusetts	first
31	(United States)	John Carter	LW	L	27	1985–86	Winchester, Massachusetts	first
27	(United States)	Dave Christian	RW	R	31	1989–90	Warroad, Minnesota	first
14	(Canada)	Robert Cimetta	W	L	20	1988	Toronto, Ontario	first (did not play)
37	(Canada)	Lou Crawford	LW	L	27	1989–90	Belleville, Ontario	first (did not play)
16	(Canada)	Peter Douris	RW	R	24	1989–90	Toronto, Ontario	first
28	(Canada)	Garry Galley	D	L	27	1988–89	Greenfield Park, Quebec	first
18	(Canada)	Bobby Gould	RW	R	32	1989–90	Petrolia, Ontario	first
38	(Canada)	Greg Hawgood	D	L	21	1986	Edmonton, Alberta	second (1988)
23	(United States)	Craig Janney – **A**	C	L	22	1986	Hartford, Connecticut	second (1988)
39	(Canada)	Greg Johnston	RW	R	25	1983	Barrie, Ontario	second (1988)
1	(Canada)	Rejean Lemelin	G	L	35	1987–88	Quebec City, Quebec	third (1986, 1988)
35	(Canada)	Andy Moog	G	L	30	1987–88	Penticton, British Columbia	sixth (1983, **1984**, **1985**, **1987**, 1988)
8	(Canada)	Cam Neely – **A**	RW	R	24	1986–87	Comox, British Columbia	second (1988)
10	(United States)	Billy O'Dwyer	C	L	30	1987–88	Boston, Massachusetts	second (1988, did not play)
41	(Canada)	Allen Pedersen	D	L	25	1983	Fort Saskatchewan, Alberta	second (1988)
19	(Canada)	Dave Poulin	C	L	31	1989–90	Timmins, Ontario	third (1985, 1987)
36	(Canada)	Brian Propp	LW	L	31	1989–90	Lanigan, Saskatchewan	fourth (1980, 1985, 1987)
20	(United States)	Bob Sweeney	C	R	26	1982	Concord, Massachusetts	second (1988)
32	(Canada)	Don Sweeney	D	L	23	1984	St. Stephen, New Brunswick	first
26	(Canada)	Glen Wesley	D	L	21	1987	Red Deer, Alberta	second (1988)
30	(Canada)	Jim Wiemer	D	L	29	1989–90	Sudbury, Ontario	second (**1988**)

=== Edmonton Oilers ===
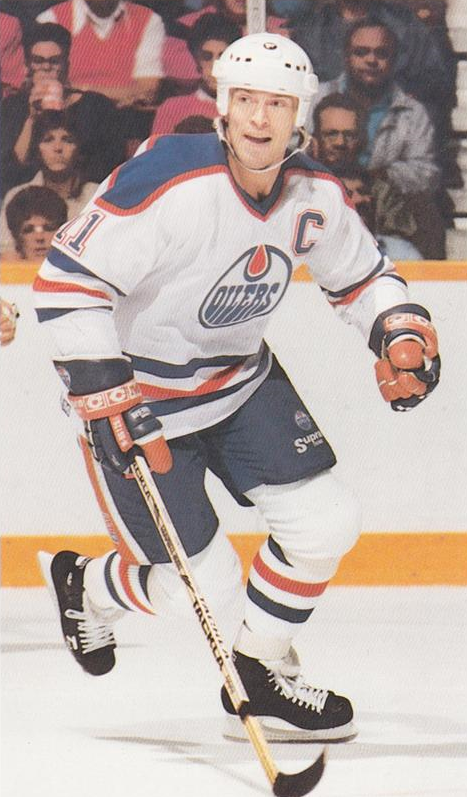
Mark Messier captained the Oilers to the Stanley Cup Final

#	Nat	Player	Position	Hand	Age	Acquired	Place of birth	Finals appearance
9	(Canada)	Glenn Anderson	RW	L	29	1979	Vancouver, British Columbia	sixth (1983, **1984**, **1985**, **1987**, **1988**)
6	(Canada)	Jeff Beukeboom	D	R	25	1983	Ajax, Ontario	third (**1987**, **1988**, did not play)
32	(Canada)	Dave Brown	RW	R	27	1988–89	Saskatoon, Saskatchewan	third (1985, 1987, did not play)
16	(Canada)	Kelly Buchberger	RW	L	23	1985	Langenburg, Saskatchewan	second (**1987**)
31	(Canada)	Grant Fuhr	G	R	27	1981	Spruce Grove, Alberta	sixth (1983, **1984**, **1985**, **1987**, **1988**, did not play: injured)
20	(Canada)	Martin Gelinas	LW	L	19	1988–89	Shawinigan, Quebec	first
12	(Canada)	Adam Graves	LW	L	22	1989–90	Toronto, Ontario	first
21	(Canada)	Randy Gregg	D	L	34	1981–82	Edmonton, Alberta	sixth (1983, **1984**, **1985**, **1987**, **1988**)
22	(Canada)	Charlie Huddy	D	L	30	1980–81	Oshawa, Ontario	sixth (1983, **1984**, **1985**, **1987**, **1988**)
85	(Czechoslovakia)	Petr Klima	LW	R	25	1989–90	Chomutov, Czechoslovakia	first
17	(Finland)	Jari Kurri – **A**	RW	R	30	1980	Helsinki, Finland	sixth (1983, **1984**, **1985**, **1987**, **1988**)
7	(Canada)	Mark Lamb	C	L	25	1987–88	Ponteix, Saskatchewan	first
4	(Canada)	Kevin Lowe – **A**	D	L	31	1979	Lachute, Quebec	sixth (1983, **1984**, **1985**, **1987**, **1988**)
14	(Canada)	Craig MacTavish	C	L	31	1985–86	London, Ontario	third (**1987**, **1988**)
11	(Canada)	Mark Messier – **C**	C	L	29	1979	Edmonton, Alberta	sixth (1983, **1984**, **1985**, **1987**, **1988**)
28	(Canada)	Craig Muni	D	L	27	1986–87	Toronto, Ontario	third (**1987**, **1988**)
8	(Canada)	Joe Murphy	RW	L	22	1989–90	London, Ontario	first
30	(Canada)	Bill Ranford	G	L	23	1987–88	Brandon, Manitoba	second (**1988**)
33	(Canada)	Pokey Reddick	G	L	25	1989–90	Halifax, Nova Scotia	first (did not play)
26	(Finland)	Reijo Ruotsalainen	D	R	30	1989–90	Oulu, Finland	second (**1987**)
19	(Soviet Union)	Anatoli Semenov	C	L	28	1989	Moscow, Soviet Union	first (did not play)
18	(Canada)	Craig Simpson	LW	R	23	1987–88	London, Ontario	second (**1988**)
25	(Canada)	Geoff Smith	D	L	21	1987	Edmonton, Alberta	first (did not play)
5	(Canada)	Steve Smith	D	L	27	1981	Glasgow, United Kingdom	third (**1987**, **1988**)
10	(Finland)	Esa Tikkanen	LW	L	25	1983	Helsinki, Finland	fourth (**1985**, **1987**, **1988**)

== Stanley Cup engraving ==
The 1990 Stanley Cup was presented to Oilers captain Mark Messier by NHL President John Ziegler following the Oilers 4–1 win over the Bruins in game five.

The following Oilers players and staff had their names engraved on the Stanley Cup

1989–90 Edmonton Oilers

=== Players ===
Centres

- 7 Mark Lamb
- 8 Joe Murphy
- 11 Mark Messier (Captain)
- 14 Craig MacTavish

Wingers

- 9 Glenn Anderson
- 10 Esa Tikkanen
- 12 Adam Graves
- 16 Kelly Buchberger
- 17 Jari Kurri (A)
- 18 Craig Simpson
- 20 Martin Gelinas
- 32 Dave Brown
- 85 Petr Klima

Defencemen

- 4 Kevin Lowe (A)
- 5 Steve Smith
- 6 Jeff Beukeboom
- 21 Randy Gregg
- 22 Charlie Huddy
- 25 Geoff Smith
- 26 Reijo Ruotsalainen
- 28 Craig Muni

Goaltenders

- 30 Bill Ranford
- 31 Grant Fuhr
- 33 Pokey Reddick

=== Coaching and administrative staff ===
- Peter Pocklington (Owner), Glen Sather (President/General Manager)
- John Muckler (Head Coach), Ted Green (Co-Coach)
- Bruce MacGregor (Asst. General Manager), Ron Low (Asst. Coach)
- Barry Fraser (Director of Player Personnel/Chief Scout), Bill Tuele (Director of Public Relations)
- Werner Baum (Controller), Dr. Gordon Cameron (Chief of Medical Staff), Dr. David Reid (Team Physician)
- Ken Lowe (Athletic Tainer-Therapist), Barrie Stafford (Trainer), Stuart Poirier (Massage Therapist)
- Lyle Kulchisky (Ass't Trainer), John Blackwell (Director of Hockey Operations, AHL)
- Garnet Bailey (Scout), Ed Chadwick (Scout), Lorne Davis (Scout)
- Harry Howell (Scout), Albert Reeves (Scout), Matti Vaisanen (Scout)

=== Stanley Cup engravings ===
- Garnet "Ace" Bailey won seven Stanley Cups. His name was engraved on the Stanley Cup five times. He was engraved as Garnet Bailey in 1972, G. Bailey in 1970, 1985, 1987, and Ace Bailey in 1990. His name was left off the Stanley Cup, but he was awarded Stanley Cup rings in 1984, 1988.
- #29 Vladimir Ruzicka (C/LW) joined Edmonton from Europe in January. Ruzicka played 25 games, but did not dress in the playoffs.
- #19 Anatoli Semenov (RW) joined Edmonton from Europe in May. Semenov played two games in the Conference Final.

Neither player qualified for engravement on the Cup, but both players received Stanley Cup rings. Ruzicka was also included on the team winning picture.

- Grant Fuhr only played 21 games during the regular season due to injuries. Although he would miss the rest of the regular season and the entire playoffs, he qualified to be on the Cup by dressing for over 40 regular season games.

=== Members of all five Edmonton Oilers championships ===
- Glenn Anderson, Grant Fuhr, Randy Gregg, Charlie Huddy, Jari Kurri, Kevin Lowe, Mark Messier (seven Players), Peter Pocklington, Glen Sather, John Mucker, Ted Green, Barry Fraser, Barry Stafford, Lyle Kulchisky (seven non-players)
- Nine non-players were part of all five championships, but not all engraved each year: Garnet 'Ace' Bailey, Ed Chadwick, Lorne Davis, Matti Vaisanen, Gordon Cameron, Bill Tuele, John Backwell, Werner Baum, and Bob Freedman

=== Members of all five Edmonton Oilers championships and New York Rangers championship (1994) ===
- Glenn Anderson, Kevin Lowe, and Mark Messier.

== Broadcasting ==
In Canada, the series was televised on the CBC.

In the United States, the series aired nationally on SportsChannel America. However, SportsChannel America's national coverage was blacked out in the Boston area due to the local rights to Bruins games in that TV market. NESN televised games one, two, and five in the Boston area while WSBK had games three and four. Had the series been extended, game six would've aired on WSBK, while game 7 would've aired on NESN.

== See also ==
- 1989–90 NHL season
- List of Stanley Cup champions
- 1989–90 Boston Bruins season
- 1989–90 Edmonton Oilers season

Preceded by Calgary Flames; 1989	Edmonton Oilers; Stanley Cup champions 1990	Succeeded by Pittsburgh Penguins; 1991
