= 1988 Stanley Cup Final =

1988 ice hockey championship series

	1	2	3	4	Total
Edmonton Oilers	2	4	6	6	4
Boston Bruins	1	2	3	3	0
- Location(s): Edmonton: Northlands Coliseum (1, 2, 4) (Note: Game four was abandoned due to a power failure at the Boston Garden with the score tied 3–3; it was subsequently replayed in Edmonton); Boston: Boston Garden) (3, 4)
- Coaches: Edmonton: Glen Sather; Boston: Terry O'Reilly
- Captains: Edmonton: Wayne Gretzky; Boston: Ray Bourque, Rick Middleton
- Referees: Denis Morel (1, 4) (Note: Morel refereed the original game 4 in Boston); Andy Van Hellemond (3, 4) (Note: Van Hellemond refereed the replayed game 4 in Edmonton); Don Koharski (2)
- Dates: May 18–26, 1988
- MVP: Wayne Gretzky (Oilers)
- Series-winning goal: Wayne Gretzky (9:44, second)
- Hall of Famers: Oilers: Glenn Anderson (2008); Grant Fuhr (2003); Wayne Gretzky (1999); Jari Kurri (2001); Kevin Lowe (2020); Mark Messier (2007); Bruins: Ray Bourque (2004); Cam Neely (2005); Coaches: Glen Sather (1997); Officials: Ray Scapinello (2008); Andy Van Hellemond (1999)
- Networks: Canada: (English): Global/Canwest (1–2), CBC (3–4) (Note: CBC aired both the original and replayed game fours.) (French): SRC; United States: (National): ESPN (Boston area): WSBK (1–2, 4), (Note: Both NESN and WSBK simulcasted the original game four in Boston, and WSBK only aired the replayed game four in Edmonton.) NESN (3–4)
- Announcers: (Global/Canwest) Dan Kelly and John Davidson (CBC) Bob Cole and Harry Neale (SRC) Richard Garneau and Gilles Tremblay (ESPN) Mike Emrick, Bill Clement (1–4), (Note: Clement did not work during the replayed game four in Edmonton due to an illness.) and Mickey Redmond (WSBK/NESN) Fred Cusick, Derek Sanderson, and Dave Shea (NESN only)

The 1988 Stanley Cup Final was the championship series of the National Hockey League's (NHL) 1987–88 season, and the culmination of the 1988 Stanley Cup playoffs. It was contested between the Edmonton Oilers and Boston Bruins. The Oilers swept the Bruins to once again repeat as Stanley Cup champions. It was the Oilers’ fourth championship in franchise history.

This was the seventh of nine consecutive Finals contested by a team from Western Canada, sixth of eight by a team from Alberta (the Oilers appeared in six of them, the Calgary Flames in two, and the Vancouver Canucks in one), and the last of five consecutive Finals to end with the Cup presentation on Alberta ice (the Oilers won four such Cups, the Montreal Canadiens the other). The series is remembered for the power failure that occurred during game four at Boston Garden, which caused that game to be suspended. The league decided to replay game four at Northlands Coliseum in Edmonton, at the site, date and time that was originally scheduled for a possible game five. Game four is also the final time that Wayne Gretzky appeared in an Edmonton Oilers uniform as he was traded to Los Angeles just prior to the next season, and the last Stanley Cup he would win as a player.

== Paths to the Finals ==
The Oilers cruised into the Finals with relative ease, losing only two games in the process. They beat the Winnipeg Jets in five games, swept the Calgary Flames, and then beat the Detroit Red Wings in five to win the Clarence S. Campbell Bowl for the fifth time in six years.

The Bruins, meanwhile, had a much harder road. It took them six games to knock off the Buffalo Sabres, then beat their longtime rivals the Montreal Canadiens in five games, and then needed the full seven games to beat the New Jersey Devils to claim the Prince of Wales Trophy.

== Game summaries ==
The Finals pitted the Oilers' offensive juggernaut against the Bruins' more balanced team. The Oilers showed their defensive prowess, surrendering just nine goals in the four completed games. Ray Bourque was physical in defending against Gretzky, but that would not ground the "Great One" on his way to claiming his second Conn Smythe Trophy and setting playoff records with 31 assists in just 18 games, and 13 points in the Finals series.

=== Game one ===
May 18	Boston Bruins	1–2	Edmonton Oilers	Northlands Coliseum	Recap

Scoring summary
Period	Team	Goal	Assist(s)	Time	Score
1st	None				
2nd	EDM	Wayne Gretzky (10) – pp	Steve Smith (8) and Jari Kurri (14)	01:56	1–0 EDM
2nd	BOS	Cam Neely (8)	Craig Janney (9) and Gord Kluzak (8)	13:15	1–1
3rd	EDM	Keith Acton (2)	Steve Smith (9) and Kevin McClelland (2)	01:15	2–1 EDM
Penalty summary
Period	Team	Player	Penalty	Time	PIM
1st	BOS	Cam Neely	Tripping	01:01	2:00
1st	EDM	Esa Tikkanen	Holding	02:10	2:00
1st	EDM	Bench	Too many men on the ice	04:20	2:00
1st	BOS	Allen Pedersen	Holding	09:17	2:00
1st	BOS	Willi Plett	Cross-checking	12:17	2:00
1st	EDM	Craig Simpson	Cross-checking	12:17	2:00
1st	BOS	Ken Linseman	High-sticking	14:13	2:00
1st	EDM	Jari Kurri	Roughing – double minor	14:13	4:00
2nd	BOS	Bench	Too many men on the ice	01:08	2:00
2nd	EDM	Esa Tikkanen	Elbowing	04:29	2:00
2nd	BOS	Willi Plett	Holding	16:08	2:00
3rd	EDM	Esa Tikkanen	Tripping	02:26	2:00
3rd	EDM	Randy Gregg	High-sticking	06:21	2:00

Shots by period
Team	1	2	3	Total
Boston	5	4	5	14
Edmonton	6	8	8	22

=== Game two ===
May 20	Boston Bruins	2–4	Edmonton Oilers	Northlands Coliseum	Recap

Scoring summary
Period	Team	Goal	Assist(s)	Time	Score
1st	EDM	Glenn Anderson (7) – pp	Wayne Gretzky (22) and Esa Tikkanen (15)	15:57	1–0 EDM
1st	EDM	Mark Messier (11) – pp	Wayne Gretzky (23) and Jari Kurri (15)	19:30	2–0 EDM
2nd	None				
3rd	BOS	Bob Joyce (8)	Craig Janney (10) and Cam Neely (8)	00:35	2–1 EDM
3rd	BOS	Ken Linseman (10)	Moe Lemay (2) and Keith Crowder (9)	03:16	2–2
3rd	EDM	Wayne Gretzky (11)	Esa Tikkanen (16)	11:21	3–2 EDM
3rd	EDM	Jari Kurri (14) – en	Mike Krushelnyski (5)	19:53	4–2 EDM
Penalty summary
Period	Team	Player	Penalty	Time	PIM
1st	BOS	Michael Thelven	High-sticking	00:43	2:00
1st	BOS	Jay Miller	Fighting – major	03:09	5:00
1st	EDM	Kevin McClelland	Fighting – major	03:09	5:00
1st	BOS	Moe Lemay	Slashing	03:57	2:00
1st	EDM	Randy Gregg	Hooking	05:59	2:00
1st	EDM	Craig Simpson	Elbowing	10:20	2:00
1st	BOS	Keith Crowder	Roughing	10:23	2:00
1st	BOS	Gord Kluzak	High-sticking	14:28	2:00
1st	BOS	Ray Bourque	High-sticking	15:48	2:00
1st	BOS	Rejean Lemelin	Delay of game	18:41	2:00
1st	BOS	Randy Burridge	High-sticking	19:06	2:00
2nd	EDM	Kevin McClelland	Holding	02:05	2:00
2nd	BOS	Keith Crowder	Roughing	06:15	2:00
2nd	EDM	Mike Krushelnyski	Roughing	06:15	2:00
2nd	BOS	Jay Miller	Roughing	10:57	2:00
2nd	BOS	Jay Miller	Misconduct	10:57	10:00
2nd	EDM	Kevin McClelland	Roughing	10:57	2:00
2nd	BOS	Kevin McClelland	Misconduct	10:57	10:00
2nd	BOS	Keith Crowder	Cross-checking	15:22	2:00
2nd	BOS	Ken Linseman	Slashing	16:53	2:00
3rd	BOS	Gord Kluzak	Roughing	19:21	2:00
3rd	EDM	Esa Tikkanen	Roughing	19:21	2:00

Shots by period
Team	1	2	3	Total
Boston	5	2	5	12
Edmonton	13	8	11	32

=== Game three ===
May 22	Edmonton Oilers	6–3	Boston Bruins	Boston Garden	Recap

Scoring summary
Period	Team	Goal	Assist(s)	Time	Score
1st	BOS	Randy Burridge (2)	Bob Sweeney (7)	02:46	1–0 BOS
1st	EDM	Kevin McClelland (2)	Wayne Gretzky (24) and Mike Krushelnyski (6)	16:18	1–1
2nd	EDM	Esa Tikkanen (5) – pp	Wayne Gretzky (25) and Glenn Anderson (14)	10:25	2–1 EDM
2nd	EDM	Glenn Anderson (8)	Craig Simpson (6)	12:57	3–1 EDM
3rd	EDM	Esa Tikkanen (6)	Wayne Gretzky (26) and Randy Gregg (6)	01:32	4–1 EDM
3rd	BOS	Moe Lemay (4)	Ken Linseman (13) and Ray Bourque (16)	04:19	4–2 EDM
3rd	EDM	Craig Simpson (11)	Glenn Anderson (15) and Mark Messier (22)	10:28	5–2 EDM
3rd	BOS	Cam Neely (9) – pp	Bob Joyce (6) and Glen Wesley (7)	14:02	5–3 EDM
3rd	EDM	Esa Tikkanen (7) – en	Wayne Gretzky (27) and Glenn Anderson (16)	19:40	6–3 EDM
Penalty summary
Period	Team	Player	Penalty	Time	PIM
1st	BOS	Michael Thelven	Holding	05:31	2:00
1st	EDM	Kevin McClelland	Tripping	08:45	2:00
1st	BOS	Cam Neely	Boarding	09:59	2:00
2nd	BOS	Allen Pedersen	Slashing	04:56	2:00
2nd	EDM	Kevin McClelland	Roughing	04:56	2:00
2nd	BOS	Jay Miller	Roughing	08:41	2:00
2nd	BOS	Jay Miller	Fighting – major	08:41	5:00
2nd	EDM	Kevin McClelland	Fighting – major	08:41	5:00
2nd	EDM	Esa Tikkanen	Holding	14:42	2:00
2nd	EDM	Craig Simpson	Holding	18:25	2:00
3rd	EDM	Marty McSorley	Hooking	13:51	2:00
3rd	EDM	Bench	Too many men on the ice	15:42	2:00

Shots by period
Team	1	2	3	Total
Edmonton	11	6	8	25
Boston	10	8	10	28

=== Game four (suspended) ===
Glenn Anderson set a new record for quickest goal from the start of a Finals game when he scored ten seconds into the contest. That record was tied two years later in the third game of the 1990 Finals by John Byce who, in a twist, was playing for the Bruins against the Oilers. Fog interfered with the game, requiring stoppages during the second period so that all 40+ players could skate around the ice to clear it away. The Oilers' Craig Simpson scored with 3:23 left in the second period, tying the game at 3–3, then the arena suffered a power failure before the ensuing face-off. The teams were sent to their dressing room until – after a very long delay and no change in the situation – NHL President John Ziegler Jr. announced that the game was suspended. Despite the game being suspended and replayed, Anderson's record is official.

Game four was subsequently rescheduled and moved to Edmonton, which was originally set to be the site of a game five if necessary. The Oilers won that game, sweeping the series and winning their fourth Stanley Cup in five years. The NHL announced that, in the event that the Bruins had managed to win game four, game five would have been played on the original date for game six in Boston, Edmonton would have hosted the rescheduled game six, and then game seven would have been played in Boston as the makeup game.

May 24	Boston Bruins	3–3	Edmonton Oilers	Boston Garden	Recap

Scoring summary
Period	Team	Goal	Assist(s)	Time	Score
1st	EDM	Glenn Anderson (9)	Mark Messier (23) and Craig Muni (3)	00:10	1–0 EDM
1st	EDM	Esa Tikkanen (8) – pp	Wayne Gretzky (28)	15:33	2–0 EDM
1st	BOS	Greg Hawgood (1)	Rick Middleton (5) and Bob Sweeney (8)	16:56	2–1 EDM
2nd	BOS	Glen Wesley (5) – sh	Unassisted	06:12	2–2
2nd	BOS	Glen Wesley (6) – pp	Ken Linseman (14)	07:37	3–2 BOS
2nd	EDM	Craig Simpson (12) – pp	Steve Smith (10) and Wayne Gretzky (29)	16:37	3–3
3rd	None (game suspended at 16:37)				

=== Game four ===
May 26	Boston Bruins	3–6	Edmonton Oilers	Northlands Coliseum	Recap

In the new Game 4, Boston had the lead on two goals in the first nine minutes but were held without a goal for over thirty minutes as Edmonton rode a three-goal second period to a 6–3 victory to win the Cup.

Scoring summary
Period	Team	Goal	Assist(s)	Time	Score
1st	BOS	Steve Kasper (6)	Randy Burridge (10) and Ray Bourque (17)	00:43	1–0 BOS
1st	EDM	Normand Lacombe (3)	Craig Muni (4) and Kevin Lowe (1)	06:07	1–1
1st	BOS	Ken Linseman (11) – pp	Ray Bourque (18)	9:44	2–1 BOS
1st	EDM	Esa Tikkanen (9) – pp	Jari Kurri (16) and Wayne Gretzky (30)	15:03	2–2
2nd	EDM	Mike Krushelnyski (4)	Kevin McClelland (3) and Kevin Lowe (2)	06:38	3–2 EDM
2nd	EDM	Wayne Gretzky (12) – pp	Esa Tikkanen (17) and Steve Smith (11)	09:44	4–2 EDM
2nd	EDM	Craig Simpson (13)	Wayne Gretzky (31) and Randy Gregg (7)	19:58	5–2 EDM
3rd	EDM	Esa Tikkanen (9)	Jari Kurri (17) and Randy Gregg (8)	01:21	6–2 EDM
3rd	BOS	Steve Kasper (7)	Greg Johnston (1) and Glen Wesley (8)	06:35	6–3 EDM
Penalty summary
Period	Team	Player	Penalty	Time	PIM
1st	BOS	Ray Bourque	High-sticking	03:55	2:00
1st	EDM	Esa Tikkanen	Hooking	08:30	2:00
1st	EDM	Mark Messier	Slashing	09:16	2:00
1st	BOS	Keith Crowder	Hooking	13:29	2:00
2nd	EDM	Craig Simpson	Unsportsmanlike conduct	00:52	2:00
2nd	BOS	Reed Larson	Tripping	03:31	2:00
2nd	BOS	Moe Lemay	Roughing	07:08	2:00
2nd	EDM	Normand Lacombe	Roughing	07:08	2:00
2nd	EDM	Michael Thelven	Holding	08:00	2:00
2nd	BOS	Bench	Too many men on the ice	10:42	2:00
2nd	EDM	Glenn Anderson	Hooking	11:55	2:00
3rd	EDM	Mike Krushelnyski	Holding	12:09	2:00
3rd	BOS	Ken Linseman	High-sticking	14:38	2:00
3rd	EDM	Esa Tikkanen	High-sticking – double minor	14:38	4:00
3rd	EDM	Mike Krushelnyski	Roughing	18:48	2:00

Shots by period
Team	1	2	3	Total
Boston	8	6	5	19
Edmonton	8	10	8	26

== Team rosters ==
Years indicated in boldface under the "Finals appearance" column signify that the player won the Stanley Cup in the given year.

=== Boston Bruins ===
#	Nat	Player	Position	Hand	Age	Acquired	Place of birth	Finals appearance
33	(United States)	John Blum	D	R	28	1983–84	Detroit, Michigan	first (did not play)
77	(Canada)	Ray Bourque – **C**	D	L	27	1979	Saint-Laurent, Quebec	first
12	(Canada)	Randy Burridge	LW	L	22	1985	Fort Erie, Ontario	first
34	(Canada)	Lyndon Byers	RW	R	24	1982	Nipawin, Saskatchewan	first
18	(Canada)	Keith Crowder – **A**	RW	R	29	1979	Windsor, Ontario	first
40	(Canada)	Greg Hawgood	D	L	19	1986	Edmonton, Alberta	first
23	(United States)	Craig Janney	C	L	20	1986	Hartford, Connecticut	first
39	(Canada)	Greg Johnston	RW	R	23	1983	Barrie, Ontario	first
27	(Canada)	Bob Joyce	LW	L	21	1987–88	Saint John, New Brunswick	first
11	(Canada)	Steve Kasper	C	L	26	1980	Saint-Lambert, Quebec	first
6	(Canada)	Gord Kluzak	D	L	24	1982	Climax, Saskatchewan	first
28	(United States)	Reed Larson	D	R	31	1985–86	Minneapolis, Minnesota	first
37	(Canada)	Moe Lemay	LW	L	26	1987–88	Saskatoon, Saskatchewan	second (**1987**)
1	(Canada)	Rejean Lemelin	G	L	33	1987–88	Quebec City, Quebec	second (1986)
13	(Canada)	Ken Linseman	C	L	29	1984–85	Kingston, Ontario	fourth (1980, 1983, **1984**)
17	(Canada)	Nevin Markwart	LW	L	23	1983	Toronto, Ontario	first
19	(Canada)	Tom McCarthy	LW	L	27	1986–87	Toronto, Ontario	second (1981)
16	(Canada)	Rick Middleton – **C**	C	L	34	1976–77	Toronto, Ontario	third (1977, 1978)
29	(United States)	Jay Miller	LW	L	27	1985–86	Wellesley, Massachusetts	first
35	(Canada)	Andy Moog	G	L	28	1987–88	Penticton, British Columbia	fifth (1983, **1984**, **1985**, **1987**)
8	(Canada)	Cam Neely	RW	R	22	1986–87	Comox, British Columbia	first
10	(United States)	Billy O'Dwyer	C	L	28	1987–88	South Boston, Massachusetts	first
41	(Canada)	Allen Pedersen	D	L	23	1983	Fort Saskatchewan, Alberta	first
25	(Canada)	Willi Plett	RW	R	32	1987–88	Asunción, Paraguay	first
40	(Canada)	Bruce Shoebottom	D	L	24	1987–88	Windsor, Ontario	first (did not play)
42	(United States)	Bob Sweeney	C	R	24	1982	Concord, Massachusetts	first
22	(Sweden)	Michael Thelven	D	R	27	1980	Stockholm, Sweden	first
26	(Canada)	Glen Wesley	D	L	19	1987	Red Deer, Alberta	first

=== Edmonton Oilers ===
#	Nat	Player	Position	Hand	Age	Acquired	Place of birth	Finals appearance
23	(Canada)	Keith Acton	C	L	30	1987–88	Stouffville, Ontario	first
9	(Canada)	Glenn Anderson	RW	L	27	1979	Vancouver, British Columbia	fifth (1983, **1984**, **1985**, **1987**)
6	(Canada)	Jeff Beukeboom	D	R	23	1983	Ajax, Ontario	second (**1987**)
15	(Canada)	Geoff Courtnall	LW	L	25	1987–88	Victoria, British Columbia	first
31	(Canada)	Grant Fuhr	G	R	25	1981	Spruce Grove, Alberta	fifth (1983, **1984**, **1985**, **1987**)
21	(Canada)	Randy Gregg	D	L	32	1981–82	Edmonton, Alberta	fifth (1983, **1984**, **1985**, **1987**)
99	(Canada)	Wayne Gretzky – **C**	C	L	27	1979–80	Brantford, Ontario	fifth (1983, **1984**, **1985**, **1987**)
12	(Canada)	Dave Hannan	C	L	26	1987–88	Onaping Falls, Ontario	first
22	(Canada)	Charlie Huddy	D	L	28	1980–81	Oshawa, Ontario	fifth (1983, **1984**, **1985**, **1987**)
26	(Canada)	Mike Krushelnyski	C	L	28	1984–85	Montreal, Quebec	third (**1985**, **1987**)
17	(Finland)	Jari Kurri	RW	R	28	1980	Helsinki, Finland	fifth (1983, **1984**, **1985**, **1987**)
19	(Canada)	Normand Lacombe	RW	R	23	1987–88	Montreal, Quebec	first
4	(Canada)	Kevin Lowe – **A**	D	L	29	1979	Lachute, Quebec	fifth (1983, **1984**, **1985**, **1987**)
14	(Canada)	Craig MacTavish	C	L	29	1985–86	London, Ontario	second (**1987**)
24	(Canada)	Kevin McClelland	RW	R	25	1983–84	Oshawa, Ontario	fourth (**1984**, **1985**, **1987**)
33	(Canada)	Marty McSorley	D	R	25	1985–86	Hamilton, Ontario	second **(1987**)
11	(Canada)	Mark Messier – **A**	LW	L	27	1979	Edmonton, Alberta	fifth (1983, **1984**, **1985**, **1987**)
28	(Canada)	Craig Muni	D	L	25	1986–87	Toronto, Ontario	second (**1987**)
30	(Canada)	Bill Ranford	G	L	21	1987–88	Brandon, Manitoba	first
18	(Canada)	Craig Simpson	LW	R	21	1987–88	London, Ontario	first
5	(Canada)	Steve Smith	D	L	25	1981	Glasgow, Scotland	second (**1987**)
10	(Finland)	Esa Tikkanen	LW	L	23	1983	Helsinki, Finland	third (**1985**, **1987**)
32	(Canada)	Jim Wiemer	D	L	27	1986–87	Sudbury, Ontario	first (did not play)

== Stanley Cup engraving ==
The 1988 Stanley Cup was presented to Oilers captain Wayne Gretzky by NHL President John Ziegler following the Oilers 6–3 win over the Bruins in game four.

The following Oilers players and staff had their names engraved on the Stanley Cup

1987–88 Edmonton Oilers

=== Players ===
Centers

Wingers

- 9 Glenn Anderson
- 10 Esa Tikkanen
- 15 Geoff Courtnall
- 17 Jari Kurri
- 18 Craig Simpson
- 19 Normand Lacombe
- 24 Kevin McClelland

Defencemen

- 4 Kevin Lowe (A)
- 5 Steve Smith
- 6 Jeff Beukeboom
- 21 Randy Gregg
- 22 Charlie Huddy
- 28 Craig Muni
- 33 Marty McSorley †

Goaltenders

- 31 Grant Fuhr
- 30 Bill Ranford
- * Played both centre and wing.
- † Played wing in the regular season.

=== Coaching and administrative staff ===
- Peter Pocklington (Owner)
- Glen Sather (President/General Manager/Head Coach)
- John Muckler (Co-Coach), Edward Ted Green (Asst. Coach)
- Bruce MacGregor (Asst. General Manager)
- Barry Fraser (Director of Player Personnel/Chief Scout), Bill Tuele (Director of Public Relations)
- Dr. Gordon Cameron (Team Physician), Peter Millar (Athletic Therapist), Juergen Merz (Massage Therapist)
- Barrie Stafford (Trainer), Lyle Kulchisky (Asst. Trainer)

=== Stanley Cup engraving ===
- #29 Daryl Reaugh (G) – joined the team after Andy Moog left in September to play for Team Canada, and at the 1988 Olympics. Reaugh would play 6 games (dressed for 60). After the Olympics, Moog was traded to Boston Bruins for minor leaguer goalie Bill Ranford. Reaugh was sent to the minors, being recalled during the conference finals. His name was left off because he was playing in the minors after the trade deadline. Reaugh was included on the team picture.
- #20 Steve Dykstra (D) – played 42 NHL games in the 1987–88 season. Dykstra joined Edmonton in a trade from the Buffalo Sabres, playing in 15 of the Oilers' last 21 games, but not in the playoffs. He was left off because he did not play all 42 games with Edmonton.
- #32 Jim Wiemer (D) – played 12 regular-season games and two games in the Conference Finals. He was left off the Stanley Cup because he did not play in the finals
- This would mark the final time Wayne Gretzky would win the Stanley Cup. In 1991, Gretzky would win the Grey Cup as Co-Owner, of the Toronto Argonauts. He became the 7th person to get his name on both the Stanley Cup and Grey Cup. (See Joe Miller, Lionel Conacher, Carl Voss, Leo Dandurand, Harold Ballard & Norman Kwong who also won both the Grey Cup and Stanley Cup.)

Team picture on the ice, after winning a championship

- After the Oilers won the 1988 Stanley Cup, Wayne Gretzky (in what ended up being his last game with the Oilers) requested a picture on the ice with all the players, and all non-playing members, including management, coaches, trainers, scouts, locker room assistants. The team honoured his request, and it has remained a tradition followed by each Stanley Cup-winning team. The team picture tradition after winning a championship then became a tradition followed by most hockey championship teams at all levels around the world.

Gretzky wanted every member of the Oilers to be included on the team picture. However, when the cup was engraved all five scouts were left off: Garnet Bailey, Ed Chadwick, Lorne Davis, Matti Vaisanen (on the Cup in 1985, 1987, 1990), Bob Freeman (part time, not on the Cup). The Oilers also left three players off the Stanley Cup: Daryl Reaugh, Steve Dykstra, Jim Weimer. Bill Tuele (Public Relations Director) had his name added to the cup for the first time. He has rings with the Oilers in 1984, 1985, 1987, but his name was not put on the Stanley Cup those seasons.

== Broadcasting ==
In the United States, this was the final year under ESPN's national three-year deal. Under the U.S. TV contracts that would take effect beginning next season, SportsChannel America would take over as the NHL's American television partner.

ESPN's coverage of the 1988 Cup Finals was blacked out locally in the Boston area due to WSBK and NESN's local rights to Bruins games.

In Canada, this was the second and final year that the English-language rights to the Cup Finals was split between the Global-Canwest consortium and the CBC. Global aired games one and two. The CBC aired game three, then both the original and replayed game fours. CBC had the rights to game 5 of the Stanley Cup Final, and Canwest/Global also had the rights to games 6 & 7 of the Stanley Cup Final between Edmonton Oilers and Boston Bruins (both CBC and Canwest/Global had the rights of Game 7, using separate production facilities and separate on-air talent), which were not necessary.

== See also ==
- 1987–88 NHL season
- List of Stanley Cup champions

== Footnotes ==
Preceded by Edmonton Oilers; 1987	Edmonton Oilers; Stanley Cup champions 1988	Succeeded by Calgary Flames; 1989
