= 1987 Stanley Cup Final =

1987 ice hockey championship series

	1	2	3	4	5	6	7	Total
Edmonton Oilers	4	3*	3	4	3	2	3	4
Philadelphia Flyers	2	2*	5	1	4	3	1	3
- * – Denotes overtime period(s)
- Location(s): Edmonton: Northlands Coliseum (1, 2, 5, 7); Philadelphia: Spectrum (3, 4, 6)
- Coaches: Edmonton: Glen Sather; Philadelphia: Mike Keenan
- Captains: Edmonton: Wayne Gretzky; Philadelphia: Dave Poulin
- Referees: Dave Newell (1, 6); Andy Van Hellemond (2, 4, 7); Don Koharski (3, 5)
- Dates: May 17–31, 1987
- MVP: Ron Hextall (Flyers)
- Series-winning goal: Jari Kurri (14:59, second)
- Hall of Famers: Oilers: Glenn Anderson (2008); Paul Coffey (2004); Grant Fuhr (2003); Wayne Gretzky (1999); Jari Kurri (2001); Kevin Lowe (2020); Mark Messier (2007); Flyers: Mark Howe (2011); Coaches: Glen Sather (1997); Officials: Andy Van Hellemond (1999)
- Networks: Canada: (English): CBC (1–2, 6–7), Global/Canwest (3–5, 7) (French): SRC; United States: (National): ESPN (Philadelphia area): WGBS (1–2, 5, 7), PRISM (3–4, 6)
- Announcers: (CBC) Bob Cole and Harry Neale (Global/Canwest) Dan Kelly and John Davidson (SRC) Richard Garneau and Gilles Tremblay (ESPN) Mike Emrick and Bill Clement (WGBS/PRISM) Gene Hart and Bobby Taylor

The 1987 Stanley Cup Final was the championship series of the National Hockey League's (NHL) 1986–87 season, and the culmination of the 1987 Stanley Cup playoffs. It was contested between the Edmonton Oilers and the Philadelphia Flyers in a rematch of the 1985 Final. Despite blowing a 3–1 series lead, the Oilers defeated the Flyers in seven games – the first seven-game Final since 1971 – for their third Stanley Cup victory.

This was the sixth of nine consecutive Finals contested by a team from Western Canada, the fifth of eight consecutive Finals contested by a team from Alberta (the Oilers appeared in six, the Calgary Flames in two), and the fourth of five consecutive Finals to end with the Cup presentation on Alberta ice (the Oilers won four times, the Montreal Canadiens once). Game 7 of this series was played on May 31, which at the time was the latest finishing date for an NHL season. The record would be broken five years later when that series ended on June 1.

== Paths to the Final ==
For the third straight year, the Edmonton Oilers and Philadelphia Flyers finished the regular season with the two best records in the NHL. (In 1984–85, the Flyers were first in NHL standings and the Oilers second; in both 1985–86 and 1986–87, the positions were reversed.) While the Oilers' success came from their vaunted offense, the Flyers relied on grit, defensive play, and solid goaltending from Vezina Trophy winner Ron Hextall.

The Oilers cruised into the Final with relative ease, losing only two games in the process. They beat the Los Angeles Kings in five games, swept the Winnipeg Jets, and then beat the Detroit Red Wings in five to win the Clarence S. Campbell Bowl for the fourth time in five years. The Flyers, meanwhile, had a much harder road. It took them six games to knock off the New York Rangers, went the full seven against the New York Islanders, and then beat Montreal, the reigning champion, in six to claim their second Prince of Wales Trophy in three years.

== Game summaries ==
The Oilers and Flyers met in the Final for the second time in three years. This time, Edmonton was the regular-season champion with 50 wins and 106 points, and Philadelphia was second with 46 wins and 100 points.

This was a rematch of the 1985 Stanley Cup Final, where the Oilers beat the Flyers in five games. Unlike the 1985 Final, this series went to seven games. Edmonton took the first two games at home, then split in Philadelphia. However, the Flyers won the next two games, one in Edmonton and one back in Philadelphia by one goal, to force a deciding seventh game. Edmonton won game seven to earn its third Stanley Cup in four seasons.

During the Stanley Cup presentation, Oilers captain Wayne Gretzky would give the Cup to Steve Smith, who one year earlier scored on his own net a goal that led to their downfall against the Calgary Flames, their in-province rivals, in the Smythe Division Final. Ron Hextall would receive the Conn Smythe Trophy for his efforts.

For the first time in the Final, both starting goalies, Hextall and Grant Fuhr, wore the full fiberglass cage mask which is now required across almost all levels of competitive hockey. Fuhr wore the original face-hugging fiberglass mask in his three previous Final appearances before switching to the full cage in the 1985–86 season. Patrick Roy was the second goalie to wear the full cage in the Final when he backstopped the Montreal Canadiens to victory vs. the Calgary Flames the previous year; the first was Gilles Meloche of the Minnesota North Stars in 1981.

Many people consider this to be one of the greatest Stanley Cup Finals of all time.

=== Game one ===
May 17	Philadelphia Flyers	2–4	Edmonton Oilers	Northlands Coliseum

With the game tied at 1–1 after 40 minutes of play, the Oilers won thanks to third-period goals by Glenn Anderson, Paul Coffey, and Jari Kurri. Gretzky registered a goal and an assist in the onslaught as part of a 4–2 win. The Flyers outshot Edmonton 31–26.

Scoring summary
Period	Team	Goal	Assist(s)	Time	Score
1st	EDM	Wayne Gretzky (4)	Jari Kurri (7) and Kevin Lowe (4)	15:06	1–0 EDM
2nd	PHI	Brian Propp (9)	Rick Tocchet (7) and Pelle Eklund (14)	15:06	1–1
3rd	EDM	Glenn Anderson (11)	Mark Messier (14)	00:48	2–1 EDM
3rd	EDM	Paul Coffey (2)	Wayne Gretzky (21) and Dave Hunter (3)	07:09	3–1 EDM
3rd	EDM	Jari Kurri (11)	Mark Messier (15) and Paul Coffey (5)	09:11	4–1 EDM
3rd	PHI	Rick Tocchet (9)	Brad Marsh (3) and Pelle Eklund (15)	10:18	4–2 EDM
Penalty summary
Period	Team	Player	Penalty	Time	PIM
1st	PHI	Bench (served by Don Nachbaur)	Too many men on the ice	04:21	2:00
1st	EDM	Kelly Buchberger	Fighting – major	17:42	5:00
1st	PHI	Dave Brown	Fighting – major	17:42	5:00
2nd	EDM	Mike Krushelnyski	Interference	03:57	2:00
2nd	PHI	Brad McCrimmon	Interference	17:56	2:00
3rd	EDM	Kevin Lowe	Slashing	13:21	2:00
3rd	PHI	Rick Tocchet	Slashing	13:21	2:00

Shots by period
Team	1	2	3	Total
Philadelphia	10	10	11	31
Edmonton	10	8	8	26

=== Game two ===
May 20	Philadelphia Flyers	2–3	OT	Edmonton Oilers	Northlands Coliseum

This time, the Flyers led 2–1 after two periods. Despite matching the Oilers line for line and speed for speed, Edmonton burned Philly with a third-period goal, then on the game-winner by Kurri, who took advantage of some disorganized defensive play by the Flyers in overtime to score the game-winning goal with a wide-open chance in a 3–2 overtime victory.

Scoring summary
Period	Team	Goal	Assist(s)	Time	Score
1st	None				
2nd	EDM	Wayne Gretzky (5) – pp	Jari Kurri (8) and Paul Coffey (6)	00:45	1–0 EDM
2nd	PHI	Derrick Smith (6)	Scott Mellanby (4) and Ron Sutter (4)	13:20	1–1
2nd	PHI	Brian Propp (10)	Rick Tocchet (8) and Brad McCrimmon (5)	16:23	2–1 PHI
3rd	EDM	Glenn Anderson (12)	Randy Gregg (5)	11:40	2–2
3rd	EDM	Jari Kurri (12)	Paul Coffey (7) and Wayne Gretzky (22)	06:50	3–2 EDM
Penalty summary
Period	Team	Player	Penalty	Time	PIM
1st	PHI	Dave Brown	Holding	02:38	2:00
1st	EDM	Paul Coffey	Holding	08:38	2:00
1st	PHI	Derrick Smith	Cross-checking	16:58	2:00
1st	PHI	Bench (served by Lindsay Carson)	Too many men on the ice	19:52	2:00
1st	PHI	Brad McCrimmon	Holding	20:00	2:00
2nd	EDM	Craig MacTavish	Interference	02:59	2:00
2nd	EDM	Steve Smith	Roughing	06:21	2:00
2nd	PHI	Kjell Samuelsson	Slashing	06:21	2:00
2nd	EDM	Paul Coffey	Roughing	09:08	2:00
2nd	PHI	Scott Mellanby	Roughing	09:08	2:00
2nd	EDM	Steve Smith	Holding	10:37	2:00
2nd	EDM	Marty McSorley	Roughing	19:25	2:00
2nd	PHI	Rick Tocchet	Roughing	19:25	2:00
3rd	PHI	Doug Crossman	Holding	12:17	2:00
3rd	EDM	Jari Kurri	Holding	16:30	2:00
OT	EDM	Glenn Anderson	Slashing	03:16	2:00
OT	PHI	Murray Craven	Holding	03:16	2:00

Shots by period
Team	1	2	3	OT	Total
Philadelphia	15	12	5	2	34
Edmonton	9	7	15	3	34

=== Game three ===
May 22	Edmonton Oilers	3–5	Philadelphia Flyers	Spectrum

Looking to take a commanding 3–0 series lead, Edmonton came out firing, taking a 2–0 lead after one period on goals by Mark Messier and Coffey, then stretching it to 3–0 on Anderson's fluke breakaway goal 1:49 into the second.

With their backs against the wall, the Flyers began a comeback on second-period goals by Murray Craven and Peter Zezel. Early in the third, tallies 17 seconds apart by Scott Mellanby and Brad McCrimmon tied the game, then put the Flyers ahead 4–3. For the remainder of the period, the Flyers gamely kept the Oilers' potent offense at bay until Brian Propp's empty-net goal sealed a 5–3 win.

Until this point, no team had ever rebounded from a 3–0 deficit to win a game in the Final, and the Flyers won their first-ever playoff game after yielding a game's first three goals.

Scoring summary
Period	Team	Goal	Assist(s)	Time	Score
1st	EDM	Mark Messier (11) – sh	Craig MacTavish (8)	04:14	1–0 EDM
1st	EDM	Paul Coffey (3)	Wayne Gretzky (23) and Jari Kurri (9)	19:51	2–0 EDM
2nd	EDM	Glenn Anderson (13) – pp	Mark Messier (16) and Paul Coffey (8)	01:49	3–0 EDM
2nd	PHI	Murray Craven (2) – pp	Rick Tocchet (9) and Ron Sutter (5)	09:04	3–1 EDM
2nd	PHI	Peter Zezel (3) – pp	Unassisted	15:20	3–2 EDM
3rd	PHI	Scott Mellanby (5)	Mark Howe (10) and Ron Sutter (6)	04:37	3–3
3rd	PHI	Brad McCrimmon (2)	Scott Mellanby (5) and Ron Sutter (7)	04:54	4–3 PHI
3rd	PHI	Brian Propp (11) – en	Kjell Samuelsson (4) and Peter Zezel (10)	19:26	5–3 PHI
Penalty summary
1st	EDM	Dave Hunter	Roughing	02:36	2:00
1st	PHI	Daryl Stanley	Slashing	09:47	2:00
1st	EDM	Mike Krushelnyski	Holding	14:04	2:00
1st	PHI	Derrick Smith	Roughing	17:36	2:00
2nd	PHI	Ron Hextall	Interference	01:12	2:00
2nd	EDM	Bench (served by Esa Tikkanen)	Too many men on the ice	07:58	2:00
2nd	EDM	Reijo Ruotsalainen	Holding	11:23	2:00
2nd	EDM	Esa Tikkanen	Slashing	14:54	2:00
2nd	PHI	Ron Sutter	High-sticking	17:49	2:00
3rd	EDM	Marty McSorley	Roughing	19:59	2:00
3rd	PHI	Dave Brown	Roughing	19:59	2:00
3rd	PHI	Ron Sutter	Slashing	19:59	2:00

Shots by period
Team	1	2	3	Total
Edmonton	8	10	10	28
Philadelphia	11	14	11	36

=== Game four ===
May 24	Edmonton Oilers	4–1	Philadelphia Flyers	Spectrum

The momentum from game three did not carry over for Philadelphia. Gretzky notched three assists as the Oilers won, 4–1, and took a three games to one series lead. In a relatively sedate affair, the most shocking event came when Flyers goaltender Ron Hextall viciously chopped his stick across the back of the legs of Edmonton's Kent Nilsson in the third period when trailing 4–1. Hextall was apparently incensed that Anderson and other Oilers had cruised through the goal crease untouched and unpenalized during the game, and took out his frustration on the last Oiler he happened to see skate by. Hextall's actions caused Nilsson no injury, but Hextall would be suspended for the first eight games of the 1987–88 season.

Scoring summary
Period	Team	Goal	Assist(s)	Time	Score
1st	EDM	Jari Kurri (13)	Wayne Gretzky (24)	05:53	1–0 EDM
1st	EDM	Kevin Lowe (1) – sh	Wayne Gretzky (25)	18:44	2–0 EDM
2nd	PHI	Brad McCrimmon (3) – pp	Wayne Gretzky (26)	08:17	2–1 EDM
2nd	EDM	Randy Gregg (3) – pp	Pelle Eklund (16) and Brian Propp (12)	12:31	3–1 EDM
3rd	EDM	Mike Krushelnyski (3)	Unassisted	04:17	4–1 EDM
Penalty summary
Period	Team	Player	Penalty	Time	PIM
1st	EDM	Esa Tikkanen	Roughing	01:16	2:00
1st	PHI	Derrick Smith	Roughing	01:16	2:00
1st	EDM	Kevin Lowe	High-sticking	03:32	2:00
1st	PHI	Brad McCrimmon	Hooking	09:35	2:00
1st	EDM	Craig MacTavish	Holding	12:42	2:00
1st	EDM	Mark Messier	Cross-checking	17:28	2:00
2nd	EDM	Wayne Gretzky	Hooking	06:34	2:00
2nd	PHI	Kjell Samuelsson	Interference	10:38	2:00
2nd	PHI	Peter Zezel	Tripping	13:59	2:00
2nd	EDM	Paul Coffey	Roughing	19:45	2:00
2nd	PHI	Rick Tocchet	Roughing	19:45	2:00
3rd	EDM	Glenn Anderson	Cross-checking	01:01	2:00
3rd	PHI	Ron Hextall	Misconduct	04:31	10:00
3rd	EDM	Charlie Huddy	Misconduct	07:39	10:00
3rd	PHI	Rick Tocchet	Misconduct	07:39	10:00
3rd	PHI	Ron Hextall	Slashing – major	08:50	5:00

Shots by period
Team	1	2	3	Total
Edmonton	8	10	11	29
Philadelphia	8	11	9	28

=== Game five ===
May 26	Philadelphia Flyers	4–3	Edmonton Oilers	Northlands Coliseum

Edmonton's newspapers had published plans for a future victory parade that day, and the Oilers tried to make those plans come to fruition when they beat Hextall for two quick first-period goals. Although the Flyers got one back and trailed 2–1 after one period, Hextall let Edmonton's third goal of the game, a tip-in by Marty McSorley with nearly two minutes gone in the second slip between his arm and body; time was growing short.

Facing the end of their season, the Flyers clawed back and tied the game 3–3 on goals by Doug Crossman and Pelle Eklund. With almost six minutes played in the third, Propp fed Rick Tocchet in the slot for the go-ahead score. Hextall and the Flyers' defence clamped down on the Oilers the rest of the way and the series came back to Philadelphia.

Scoring summary
Period	Team	Goal	Assist(s)	Time	Score
1st	EDM	Jari Kurri (14) – pp	Randy Gregg (6) and Mike Krushelnyski (4)	02:58	1–0 EDM
1st	EDM	Marty McSorley (3)	Wayne Gretzky (27)	06:35	2–0 EDM
1st	PHI	Rick Tocchet (10)	Brian Propp (13) and Pelle Eklund (17)	19:10	2–1 EDM
2nd	EDM	Marty McSorley (4)	Charlie Huddy (6) and Jaroslav Pouzar (1)	01:32	3–1 EDM
2nd	PHI	Doug Crossman (4)	Brian Propp (14) and Pelle Eklund (18)	08:08	3–2 EDM
2nd	PHI	Pelle Eklund (7)	Brian Propp (15) and Rick Tocchet (10)	12:40	3–3
3rd	PHI	Rick Tocchet (11)	Brian Propp (16)	05:26	4–3 PHI
Penalty summary
1st	EDM	Paul Coffey	Roughing	02:23	2:00
1st	PHI	Rick Tocchet	Roughing	02:23	2:00
1st	PHI	Dave Brown	Holding	02:49	2:00
1st	PHI	Kjell Samuelsson	Holding	10:52	2:00
1st	EDM	Jaroslav Pouzar	Hooking	15:10	2:00
2nd	EDM	Mark Messier	Tripping	12:10	2:00
2nd	EDM	Mike Krushelnyski	Roughing	12:48	2:00
2nd	PHI	Ron Sutter	Roughing	12:48	2:00
2nd	EDM	Jari Kurri	Slashing	18:39	2:00
2nd	PHI	Derrick Smith	Slashing	18:39	2:00
3rd	EDM	Reijo Ruotsalainen	Roughing	06:11	2:00
3rd	PHI	Derrick Smith	Roughing	06:11	2:00

Shots by period
Team	1	2	3	Total
Philadelphia	16	6	13	35
Edmonton	16	10	8	34

=== Game six ===
May 28	Edmonton Oilers	2–3	Philadelphia Flyers	Spectrum

With a chance to close out the series without the pressure of home ice, Edmonton took a 2–0 lead against a hesitant Flyers club on a disputed goal by Kevin Lowe and a stuffer by checking winger Kevin McClelland. The Oilers took control of the game in all aspects, outshooting Philly 15–5 in the opening 20 minutes. The Flyers had little chance until Lindsay Carson managed to thread a puck through Grant Fuhr's pads a little more than seven minutes into the second period. The Oilers kept the pressure on, and carried play into the third period. However, Anderson's careless high-sticking penalty with eight minutes left in regulation led to Propp's electric game-tying goal, snapping a shot high into the left corner of the net.

Eighty-four seconds later, little-used Flyer defenceman J. J. Daigneault stepped up to a dying puck inside the Oilers' blue line, and cranked the puck just inside the right post to give the Flyers a 3–2 advantage. Daigneault's goal stirred the Spectrum crowd to a frenzy providing what has been called the loudest moment in that arena's history, and the game is often nicknamed "The Night the Spectrum Shook". The only threat to that lead came with ten seconds left, when Mark Messier picked off Hextall's attempted clear, broke in, and took one shot into Hextall's pads and a second over the top of the net. Mark Howe knocked down a last-ditch Oiler effort at the buzzer, and the Final headed to a seventh game for the first time since 1971.

Scoring summary
Period	Team	Goal	Assist(s)	Time	Score
1st	EDM	Kevin Lowe (2) – sh	Wayne Gretzky (28) and Jari Kurri (10)	05:02	1–0 EDM
1st	EDM	Kevin McClelland (2)	Craig MacTavish (9) and Craig Muni (2)	15:16	2–0 EDM
2nd	PHI	Lindsay Carson (3)	Dave Brown (2) and Brad Marsh (4)	07:12	2–1 EDM
3rd	PHI	Brian Propp (12) – pp	Pelle Eklund (19) and Doug Crossman (13)	13:04	2–2
3rd	PHI	J. J. Daigneault (1)	Unassisted	14:28	3–2 PHI
Penalty summary
Period	Team	Player	Penalty	Time	PIM
1st	EDM	Marty McSorley	High-sticking	02:15	2:00
1st	PHI	Rick Tocchet	Roughing	02:15	2:00
1st	EDM	Dave Hunter	Holding	03:22	2:00
1st	EDM	Paul Coffey	High-sticking	06:04	2:00
1st	PHI	Dave Poulin	Roughing	06:04	2:00
1st	EDM	Kevin McClelland	Roughing – double minor	08:45	4:00
1st	PHI	Rick Tocchet	Roughing	08:45	2:00
1st	EDM	Glenn Anderson	Roughing	12:39	2:00
1st	PHI	Kjell Samuelsson	Roughing	12:39	2:00
1st	PHI	Dave Poulin	Interference	13:09	2:00
1st	PHI	Dave Poulin	High-sticking	15:19	2:00
1st	EDM	Glenn Anderson	Roughing	20:00	2:00
1st	PHI	Kjell Samuelsson	Roughing	20:00	2:00
2nd	EDM	Paul Coffey	Tripping	01:41	2:00
2nd	EDM	Glenn Anderson	High-sticking	09:06	2:00
2nd	EDM	Glenn Anderson	Roughing	09:06	2:00
2nd	PHI	Brad McCrimmon	High-sticking	09:06	2:00
2nd	PHI	Brad McCrimmon	Unsportsmanlike conduct	09:06	2:00
2nd	PHI	Doug Crossman	Tripping	09:48	2:00
2nd	EDM	Marty McSorley	Holding	15:12	2:00
3rd	EDM	Mark Messier	Hooking	00:09	2:00
3rd	EDM	Glenn Anderson	High-sticking	12:21	2:00

Shots by period
Team	1	2	3	Total
Edmonton	15	9	8	32
Philadelphia	5	8	10	23

=== Game seven ===
May 31	Philadelphia Flyers	1–3	Edmonton Oilers	Northlands Coliseum

Two unusual occurrences marked the opening of the game, which marked the first game 7 since 1971: the Flyers were awarded a two-man advantage one minute into the contest, and scored the first goal of the game for the first time in the Final. Craven banked a shot off Fuhr's skate only 1:41 into the game for a 1–0 Philadelphia lead. The Oilers came back six minutes later when Messier finished off a 3-on-1 with a backhander to tie the game. Kurri delivered a huge blow to Flyers victory hopes when he beat Hextall with quick wrist shot off a Gretzky pass at 14:59 into the second period, giving the Oilers a one-goal cushion. Edmonton dominated the second and third periods of the game, controlling the flow with their speed, maintaining puck possession such that they allowed the Flyers only 6 shots on goal in the middle 20 minutes and a mere 2 shots in the third, while scoring one goal each in the second (on 13 shots) and third (on 12 shots) periods, including an insurance goal on Anderson's 30-footer up the middle with 2:24 left in the game.

Philadelphia's Hextall, who had 40 saves in game seven, was awarded the Conn Smythe Trophy as the playoffs MVP despite Edmonton's victory. His feat was the fourth time a Conn Smythe winner came from a losing team. He was preceded by Roger Crozier, goaltender with the Detroit Red Wings in 1966, St. Louis Blues goalie Glenn Hall in 1968, and Flyers right wing Reggie Leach in 1976. Jean-Sebastien Giguere, also a goalie, would later become the 2003 playoff MVP with the Final-losing Mighty Ducks of Anaheim. In 2024, Connor McDavid would be awarded the Conn Smythe Trophy after falling to the Florida Panthers with the Oilers.

This is the most recent game seven in the Final to have a lead change, and the most recent to have a game-tying goal until 2024. All nine games seven played since then (1994, 2001, 2003, 2004, 2006, 2009, 2011, 2019, and 2024) had neither, aside from the aforementioned 2024 Final which had a game-tying goal. This was also the last time that the champs would skate off with the Cup after winning the trophy. When the Oilers repeated the next year, they started the tradition in which everyone gathered around with the Cup in a team photo.

Scoring summary
Period	Team	Goal	Assist(s)	Time	Score
1st	PHI	Murray Craven (3) – pp	Pelle Eklund (20) and Doug Crossman (14)	01:41	1–0 PHI
1st	EDM	Mark Messier (12)	Kent Nilsson (13) and Glenn Anderson (13)	07:45	1–1
2nd	EDM	Jari Kurri (15)	Wayne Gretzky (29)	14:59	2–1 EDM
3rd	EDM	Glenn Anderson (14)	Charlie Huddy (7)	17:36	3–1 EDM
Penalty summary
Period	Team	Player	Penalty	Time	PIM
1st	EDM	Mark Messier	Cross-checking	00:34	2:00
1st	EDM	Paul Coffey	Holding	01:13	2:00
1st	PHI	Dave Poulin	Hooking	04:22	2:00
2nd	PHI	Ilkka Sinisalo	Hooking	03:39	2:00
2nd	PHI	Brad Marsh	Holding	12:15	2:00
2nd	EDM	Steve Smith	Roughing	15:27	2:00
2nd	PHI	Scott Mellanby	Roughing	15:27	2:00
2nd	EDM	Mark Messier	Charging	16:02	2:00
3rd	EDM	Craig MacTavish	Roughing	04:31	2:00
3rd	EDM	Marty McSorley	Roughing	04:31	2:00
3rd	PHI	Rick Tocchet	Roughing	04:31	2:00
3rd	PHI	Ron Hextall	Roughing	04:31	2:00
3rd	EDM	Esa Tikkanen	Roughing	14:16	2:00
3rd	PHI	Doug Crossman	Holding	14:16	2:00

Shots by period
Team	1	2	3	Total
Philadelphia	12	6	2	20
Edmonton	18	13	12	43

== Broadcasting ==
In the United States, the series aired nationally on ESPN. However, ESPN's national coverage was blacked out in the Philadelphia area due to the local rights to Flyers games in that TV market. WGBS aired four games at the Northlands Coliseum while PRISM televised three games at the Spectrum.

In Canada, this was the first of two consecutive years that the English-language rights to the Cup Final was split between the Global-Canwest consortium and the CBC. The CBC exclusively aired games one, two and six, while Global exclusively televised games three, four, and five. Game seven was then broadcast simultaneously by both networks, with each broadcaster using its own separate production facilities and on-air talent.

== Team rosters ==
=== Edmonton Oilers ===
#	Nat	Player	Position	Hand	Age	Acquired	Place of birth	Finals appearance
9	(Canada)	Glenn Anderson	RW	L	26	1979	Vancouver, British Columbia	fourth (1983, 1984, 1985)
6	(Canada)	Jeff Beukeboom	D	R	22	1983	Ajax, Ontario	first (did not play)
16	(Canada)	Kelly Buchberger	RW	L	20	1985	Langenburg, Saskatchewan	first
7	(Canada)	Paul Coffey	D	L	25	1980	Weston, Ontario	fourth (1983, 1984, 1985)
31	(Canada)	Grant Fuhr	G	R	24	1981	Spruce Grove, Alberta	fourth (1983, 1984, 1985)
21	(Canada)	Randy Gregg	D	L	31	1981–82	Edmonton, Alberta	fourth (1983, 1984, 1985)
99	(Canada)	Wayne Gretzky – C	C	L	26	1979–80	Brantford, Ontario	fourth (1983, 1984, 1985)
22	(Canada)	Charlie Huddy	D	L	27	1980–81	Oshawa, Ontario	fourth (1983, 1984, 1985)
12	(Canada)	Dave Hunter	LW	L	29	1979–80	Petrolia, Ontario	fourth (1983, 1984, 1985)
26	(Canada)	Mike Krushelnyski	C	L	27	1984–85	Montreal, Quebec	second (1985)
17	(Finland)	Jari Kurri	RW	R	27	1980	Helsinki, Finland	fourth (1983, 1984, 1985)
18	(Canada)	Moe Lemay	LW	L	25	1986–87	Saskatoon, Saskatchewan	first
4	(Canada)	Kevin Lowe – A	D	L	28	1979	Lachute, Quebec	fourth (1983, 1984, 1985)
14	(Canada)	Craig MacTavish	C	L	28	1985–86	London, Ontario	first
24	(Canada)	Kevin McClelland	RW	R	24	1983–84	Oshawa, Ontario	third (1984, 1985)
33	(Canada)	Marty McSorley	RW	R	24	1985–86	Hamilton, Ontario	first
11	(Canada)	Mark Messier – A	LW	L	26	1979	Edmonton, Alberta	fourth (1983, 1984, 1985)
35	(Canada)	Andy Moog	G	L	27	1980	Penticton, British Columbia	fourth (1983, 1984, 1985)
28	(Canada)	Craig Muni	D	L	24	1986–87	Toronto, Ontario	first
15	(Sweden)	Kent Nilsson	C	L	30	1986–87	Nynashamn, Sweden	first
20	(Czechoslovakia)	Jaroslav Pouzar	LW	L	35	1986–87	Cakov, Czechoslovakia	fourth (1983, 1984, 1985)
29	(Finland)	Reijo Ruotsalainen	D	R	27	1986–87	Oulu, Finland	first
5	(Canada)	Steve Smith	D	L	24	1981	Glasgow, Scotland	first
10	(Finland)	Esa Tikkanen	LW	L	22	1983	Helsinki, Finland	second (1985)

=== Philadelphia Flyers ===
#	Nat	Player	Position	Hand	Age	Acquired	Place of birth	Finals appearance
34	(Canada)	Craig Berube	LW	L	21	1985–86	Calahoo, Alberta	first (did not play)
21	(Canada)	Dave Brown	RW	R	24	1982	Saskatoon, Saskatchewan	second (1985)
18	(Canada)	Lindsay Carson	LW	L	26	1979	Oxbow, Saskatchewan	second (1985)
32	(Canada)	Murray Craven	LW	L	22	1984–85	Medicine Hat, Alberta	second (1985)
3	(Canada)	Doug Crossman	D	L	26	1983–84	Peterborough, Ontario	second (1985)
15	(Canada)	J. J. Daigneault	D	L	21	1986–87	Montreal, Quebec	first
9	(Sweden)	Pelle Eklund	LW	L	24	1983	Solna, Sweden	first
27	(Canada)	Ron Hextall	G	L	23	1982	Brandon, Manitoba	first
36	(Canada)	Al Hill	C	L	32	1984–85	Nanaimo, British Columbia	second (1980, did not play)
17	(United States)	Ed Hospodar	D	L	28	1984–85	Bowling Green, Ohio	second (1985, did not play: suspended)
2	(United States)	Mark Howe – A	D	L	32	1982–83	Detroit, Michigan	second (1985)
12	(Canada)	Tim Kerr	RW	R	27	1980–81	Windsor, Ontario	second (1985, did not play: injured)
8	(Canada)	Brad Marsh – A	D	L	29	1981–82	London, Ontario	second (1985)
10	(Canada)	Brad McCrimmon	D	L	28	1982–83	Dodsland, Saskatchewan	second (1985)
19	(Canada)	Scott Mellanby	RW	R	20	1984	Montreal, Quebec	first
42	(Canada)	Don Nachbaur	C	L	28	1984–85	Kitimat, British Columbia	second (1983)
20	(Canada)	Dave Poulin – C	C	L	28	1982–83	Timmins, Ontario	second (1985)
26	(Canada)	Brian Propp	LW	L	28	1979	Lanigan, Saskatchewan	third (1980, 1985)
33	(Canada)	Chico Resch	G	L	38	1985–86	Moose Jaw, Saskatchewan	second (1980)
28	(Sweden)	Kjell Samuelsson	D	R	28	1986–87	Tingsryd, Sweden	first
23	(Finland)	Ilkka Sinisalo	RW	L	28	1981–82	Valkeakoski, Finland	second (1985)
24	(Canada)	Derrick Smith	LW	L	22	1983	Scarborough, Ontario	second (1985)
29	(Canada)	Daryl Stanley	D	L	24	1981–82	Winnipeg, Manitoba	first
14	(Canada)	Ron Sutter	C	R	23	1982	Viking, Alberta	second (1985)
22	(Canada)	Rick Tocchet	RW	R	23	1983	Scarborough, Ontario	second (1985)
37	(Canada)	Tim Tookey	C	L	26	1985–86	Edmonton, Alberta	first
25	(Canada)	Peter Zezel	C	L	22	1983	Scarborough, Ontario	second (1985)

== Stanley Cup engraving ==
The 1987 Stanley Cup was presented to Oilers captain Wayne Gretzky by NHL President John Ziegler following the Oilers 3–1 win over the Flyers in game seven.

The following Oilers players and staff had their names engraved on the Stanley Cup

1986–87 Edmonton Oilers

=== Players ===
Centers

Wingers

- 9 Glenn Anderson
- 10 Esa Tikkanen
- 12 Dave Hunter
- 16 Kelly Buchberger
- 17 Jari Kurri
- 18 Moe Lemay
- 20 Jaroslav Pouzar
- 24 Kevin McClelland
- 33 Marty McSorley

Defencemen

- 4 Kevin Lowe (A)
- 5 Steve Smith
- 6 Jeff Beukeboom †
- 7 Paul Coffey
- 21 Randy Gregg
- 22 Charlie Huddy
- 28 Craig Muni
- 29 Reijo Ruotsalainen

Goaltenders

- 31 Grant Fuhr
- 35 Andy Moog
- * Played both centre and wing.
- † Did not play or dress in the Final.

=== Coaching and administrative staff ===
- Peter Pocklington (Owner)
- Glen Sather (President/General Manager/Head Coach)
- Bruce MacGregor (Asst. General Manager)
- John Muckler (Co-Coach), Edward Ted Green (Asst. Coach)
- Ron Low (Ass't Coach), Barry Fraser (Director of Player Personnel/Chief Scout)
- Garnet "Ace" Bailey (Scout), Ed Chadwick (Scout), Lorne Davis (Scout), Matti Valsanen (Scout)
- Peter Millar (Athletic Therapist), Juergen Merz (Message Therapist), Dr. Gordon Cameron (Team Physician)
- Barrie Stafford (Trainer), Lyle Kulchisky (Asst. Trainer)

=== Stanley Cup engraving ===
- #8 Wayne Van Dorp (LW) – played three regular season games, and three games in the Conference Finals This was not enough to qualify for his name being engraved on the Stanley Cup.

== See also ==
- 1986–87 NHL season
- List of Stanley Cup champions

== Notes ==
Preceded by Montreal Canadiens; 1986	Edmonton Oilers; Stanley Cup champions 1987	Succeeded by Edmonton Oilers; 1988
