= Glen Wesley =

Canadian ice hockey player (born 1968)

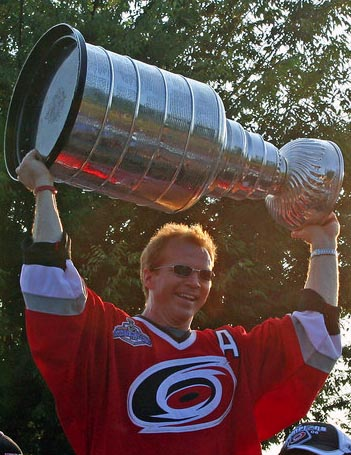
- Wesley with the Carolina Hurricanes in 2006
- Born: October 2, 1968 (age 58) Red Deer, Alberta, Canada
- Height: 6 ft 1 in (185 cm)
- Weight: 207 lb (94 kg; 14 st 11 lb)
- Position: Defence
- Shot: Left
- Played for: Boston Bruins; Hartford Whalers; Carolina Hurricanes; Toronto Maple Leafs
- National team: Canada
- NHL draft: 3rd overall, 1987; Boston Bruins
- Playing career: 1987–2008
Medal record
Representing Canada
World Championships
Silver medal – second place	1996 Vienna

Glen Edwin Wesley (born October 2, 1968) is a Canadian former ice hockey defenceman who played 20 seasons in the National Hockey League (NHL) for the Boston Bruins, Hartford Whalers, Carolina Hurricanes, and Toronto Maple Leafs.

After excelling for the Portland Winter Hawks of the Western Hockey League, Wesley was drafted as the third overall pick by the Boston Bruins in 1987. He immediately made the team and recorded 37 points while making the NHL All-Rookie Team. With Boston, he reached the Stanley Cup Final twice in 1988 and 1990, losing each time. He recorded two 50-point seasons with the team before being traded for multiple first-round draft picks to the Hartford Whalers prior to the 1994–95 season. Wesley ultimately would play all but seven games of the next fourteen years with the team in Hartford and Carolina and reach the Stanley Cup Final in 2002 and 2006, with the latter seeing him win for his first championship after 169 playoff games, the most for active players without a championship. He retired after the 2007–08 season, having played over 1,500 combined regular season and playoff games. Wesley saw his number two jersey retired by the Hurricanes in 2009, making him the second Hurricane to receive the honor.

After his playing career ended, he worked with the Hurricanes as their director of player development from 2008 to 2018. Currently, he serves as a development coach with the St. Louis Blues, who hired him in 2018.

== Playing career ==
Wesley was drafted third overall by the Boston Bruins in the 1987 NHL entry draft from the Portland Winter Hawks, appearing in 202 regular season games over 3+ seasons, scoring 49 goals and 175 assists for 224 points.

Wesley began his NHL career with the Boston Bruins, whom he played for from 1987 to 1994. He earned a berth on the 1988 All-Rookie team. He reached the Stanley Cup Final twice with the Bruins, in 1988 and 1990, though the Bruins lost both series to the Edmonton Oilers. As a rookie in the 1988 Final, Wesley scored two goals in game four, a contest which would eventually be suspended and replayed due to power failure at Boston Garden. His dramatic last-minute goal in game five of the 1990 playoffs against Montreal would help the Bruins reach the Final for the second time in three years.

Prior to the start of the 1994–95 season, Wesley was traded to the Hartford Whalers for their first-round draft picks in 1995, 1996, and 1997. With the picks, the Bruins drafted Kyle McLaren (1995), Johnathan Aitken (1996) and Sergei Samsonov (1997), the latter of whom was Wesley's teammate in his final year in the NHL.

Wesley moved with the Whalers to Carolina in 1997 and quickly became a leader. In the 2001–02 season, he reached the Stanley Cup Final for a third time, although the Hurricanes lost to the Detroit Red Wings in five games. In March 2003, nearing the trade deadline as a soon to be unrestricted free agent with the Hurricanes out of contention, he was traded from Carolina to Toronto for a second-round pick, joining the Maple Leafs prior to the Stanley Cup playoffs. In his seventh game with the team, a blocked shot resulted in him breaking his foot, although the full extent of his injury wasn't known to the public at the time. He returned two games into the playoffs but not fully at 100 percent as the Maple Leafs lost in the first round in seven games. He re-signed with the Hurricanes at the end of the season. In the 2005–06 season, Wesley got his fourth trip to the Stanley Cup Final, which would see him matched against the Edmonton Oilers for the third time. The Hurricanes prevailed in game seven to give Wesley his first championship. With the victory, he ended one of the longest streaks for active players who had not yet won a Stanley Cup, having played 169 playoff games before winning his first Stanley Cup. Wesley played two more seasons with the Hurricanes before retiring, leaving him as the only player to have played in each of the Hurricanes' first 10 seasons since the team relocated to North Carolina.

On June 5, 2008, Wesley announced his retirement after his 20th NHL season, and his 10th with the Carolina Hurricanes. He remains in the Hurricanes organization as Director of Defensemen Development. The Hurricanes retired Wesley's No. 2 jersey February 17, 2009, against the Boston Bruins, who Wesley began his NHL career with. Wesley was the only player to don #2 with the Hurricanes, as the number was previously retired by the Hartford Whalers in honor of Rick Ley. When the franchise relocated, Wesley changed his number from #20 to #2, marking the distinction of the number being retired by the same franchise for two different players in two different cities.

== International play ==
Wesley represented Canada twice in his playing career. In 1987, he played in the World Junior Ice Hockey Championships alongside future NHL stars Theoren Fleury, Mike Keane, Brendan Shanahan, and Pierre Turgeon. Infamously, the final game saw the Canadians get involved in a brawl (later dubbed the "Punch-up in Piestany") with the Soviet team (who was trailing 2–4 in a game Canada needed to win to potentially win the gold) that saw both teams disqualified.

In 1996, he represented Canada for the 1996 Men's Ice Hockey World Championships, where Canada finished second.

== Personal life ==
Wesley and his wife, Barb, have three children, Amanda, Josh and Matthew. His son Josh was drafted by the Carolina Hurricanes in the 2014 NHL entry draft and was playing for the AHL's Utica Comets as of April 2021.

Wesley lived in Danvers, Massachusetts in the early 1990s while a member of the Bruins and Avon, Connecticut from 1994 until 1997 before settling in Cary, North Carolina.

Wesley, a resident of the United States since he played junior hockey, became an American citizen in 2005. As part of his day with the Stanley Cup, Wesley took the trophy to Camp Lejeune.

== Awards and achievements ==
- Named Western Hockey League Western Conference Defenceman of the Year 1985–86 and 1986–87
- WHL West First All-Star Team – 1986 & 1987
- Named to the NHL All-Rookie Team in 1988.
- Played in NHL All-Star Game (1989)
- Member of Stanley Cup champion Carolina Hurricanes in 2006.
- Had his number 2 retired by the Carolina Hurricanes on February 17, 2009.
- In 2023 he would be named one of the top 100 Bruins players of all time.

== Career statistics ==
=== Regular season and playoffs ===
			Regular season					Playoffs
Season	Team	League	GP	G	A	Pts	PIM	GP	G	A	Pts	PIM
1983–84	Red Deer Rustlers	AJHL	57	9	20	29	40	—	—	—	—	—
1983–84	Portland Winter Hawks	WHL	3	1	2	3	0	—	—	—	—	—
1984–85	Portland Winter Hawks	WHL	67	16	52	68	76	6	1	6	7	8
1985–86	Portland Winter Hawks	WHL	69	16	75	91	96	15	3	11	14	29
1985–86	Portland Winter Hawks	MC	—	—	—	—	—	4	0	2	2	4
1986–87	Portland Winter Hawks	WHL	63	16	46	62	72	20	8	18	26	27
1987–88	Boston Bruins	NHL	79	7	30	37	69	23	6	8	14	22
1988–89	Boston Bruins	NHL	77	19	35	54	61	10	0	2	2	4
1989–90	Boston Bruins	NHL	78	9	27	36	48	21	2	6	8	36
1990–91	Boston Bruins	NHL	80	11	32	43	78	19	2	9	11	19
1991–92	Boston Bruins	NHL	78	9	37	46	54	15	2	4	6	15
1992–93	Boston Bruins	NHL	64	8	25	33	47	4	0	0	0	0
1993–94	Boston Bruins	NHL	81	14	44	58	64	13	3	3	6	12
1994–95	Hartford Whalers	NHL	48	2	14	16	50	—	—	—	—	—
1995–96	Hartford Whalers	NHL	68	8	16	24	88	—	—	—	—	—
1996–97	Hartford Whalers	NHL	68	8	26	32	40	—	—	—	—	—
1997–98	Carolina Hurricanes	NHL	82	6	19	25	36	—	—	—	—	—
1998–99	Carolina Hurricanes	NHL	74	7	17	24	44	6	0	1	1	2
1999–2000	Carolina Hurricanes	NHL	78	7	15	22	38	—	—	—	—	—
2000–01	Carolina Hurricanes	NHL	71	5	16	21	42	6	0	0	0	0
2001–02	Carolina Hurricanes	NHL	77	5	13	18	56	22	0	2	2	12
2002–03	Carolina Hurricanes	NHL	63	1	7	8	40	—	—	—	—	—
2002–03	Toronto Maple Leafs	NHL	7	0	3	3	4	5	0	1	1	2
2003–04	Carolina Hurricanes	NHL	74	0	6	6	32	—	—	—	—	—
2005–06	Carolina Hurricanes	NHL	64	2	8	10	46	25	0	2	2	16
2006–07	Carolina Hurricanes	NHL	68	1	12	13	56	—	—	—	—	—
2007–08	Carolina Hurricanes	NHL	78	1	7	8	52	—	—	—	—	—
NHL totals			1,457	128	409	537	1,045	169	15	38	53	141

=== International ===
Year	Team	Event	Result	GP	G	A	Pts	PIM
1987	Canada	WJC	DQ	6	2	1	3	4
1996	Canada	WC	2nd place, silver medalist(s)	8	0	1	1	4
Junior totals				6	2	1	3	4
Senior totals				8	0	1	1	4

== See also ==
- List of NHL players with 1,000 games played

Preceded by Craig Janney	Boston Bruins first-round draft pick 1987	Succeeded by Stephane Quintal
