= Craig Janney =

American ice hockey player (born 1967)

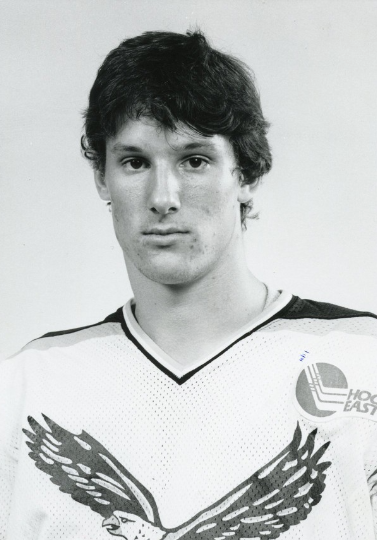
- Janney in 1987
- Born: September 26, 1967 (age 58) Hartford, Connecticut, U.S.
- Height: 6 ft 1 in (185 cm)
- Weight: 200 lb (91 kg; 14 st 4 lb)
- Position: Center
- Shot: Left
- Played for: Boston Bruins; St. Louis Blues; San Jose Sharks; Winnipeg Jets; Phoenix Coyotes; Tampa Bay Lightning; New York Islanders
- National team: United States
- NHL draft: 13th overall, 1986; Boston Bruins
- Playing career: 1987–1999

Craig Harlan Janney (born September 26, 1967) is an American former professional ice hockey center who played twelve seasons in the National Hockey League (NHL) from 1987–88 until 1998–99, when blood clots ended his career prematurely.

== Playing career ==
Known as an excellent puck-distributing center, Janney averaged nearly one point per game in his NHL career. Janney was drafted in the first round, 13th overall by the Boston Bruins in the 1986 NHL entry draft, and also played in the 1987 World Ice Hockey Championships, 1991 Canada Cup and the 1994 World Ice Hockey Championships for Team USA.

Prior to his NHL career, Janney attended Enfield High School in Enfield, Connecticut before attending Deerfield Academy. Janney played for the Boston College Eagles during his collegiate years, and he also played on the 1988 U.S. Olympic Team that finished seventh at the Calgary Olympic Games, where he had six points in five Olympic contests. He is a member of the Varsity Club Hall of Fame, having been inducted in 2009.

Janney played in just 15 games in his rookie season for Boston but he was a healthy presence for the team during their run in the 1988 Stanley Cup playoffs that saw him play in 23 games and record six goals with 10 assists as the Bruins lost in the Stanley Cup Final. Janney was second in assists for the 1990 Stanley Cup playoffs with 19 (second only to Rick Middleton for one postseason and not matched since) as the Bruins once again reached (and lost) the Stanley Cup Final. On February 7, 1992, the Boston Bruins traded Janney with Stephane Quintal to the St. Louis Blues for Adam Oates. In the 1992-93 season, Janney had 24 goals and a career-high 82 assists for a total of 106 points to become the fifth Blues player to record 100 points in a season. In March 1994, the St. Louis Blues signed restricted free agent Petr Nedvěd, who was in a contract dispute with the Vancouver Canucks. An arbitrator awarded the Canucks a second-round draft pick along with Janney. Janney refused to play for Vancouver due to being unwilling to leave St. Louis or his family. As such, the Canucks (who had demanded Brendan Shanahan in the first place) traded Janney back to the Blues for Jeff Brown, Bret Hedican and Nathan LaFayette. In the middle of the 1994-95 season, Janney saw his playing time decrease and he left the team on February 18. On March 6, he was traded to the San Jose Sharks for Jeff Norton and a conditional draft pick. He recorded 82 points in 98 games with the Sharks while later expressing his fond memories of playing in San Jose. One year later, Janney was traded to the Winnipeg Jets for Darren Turcotte and a second-round draft pick. Janney joined the team when it relocated to become the Phoenix Coyotes, before being traded to the Tampa Bay Lightning on June 11, 1998, along for the rights to Louie DeBrusk and a fifth round pick in 1998. Janney suffered a blood clot in his right leg on March 23, 1999 that saw him committed to the hospital. He would recover from the clot but never played hockey again. When he retired, he was 23rd in playoff assists with 86.

In 2004, Craig Janney was honored as having "The Softest Hands in Hockey" by the NHL Alumni Board. On February 13, 2007 Janney was named the interim head coach of the Lubbock Cotton Kings of the CHL. He would finish the season, but the Lubbock Cotton Kings would cease operations at the end of the 2007 season.

Recently, Janney has been appearing on NESN for Hockey East coverage. He currently resides in Scottsdale, Arizona with his wife, former model Kim Janney and daughter Barrette Janney.

Janney is a 1996 inductee of the Enfield Athletic Hall of Fame.

== Career statistics ==
=== Regular season and playoffs ===
			Regular season					Playoffs
Season	Team	League	GP	G	A	Pts	PIM	GP	G	A	Pts	PIM
1984–85	Deerfield Academy	HS-Prep	17	35	33	68	6	—	—	—	—	—
1985–86	Boston College	HE	34	13	14	27	8	—	—	—	—	—
1986–87	Boston College	HE	37	28	55	83	6	—	—	—	—	—
1987–88	United States	Intl	52	26	44	70	6	—	—	—	—	—
1987–88	Boston Bruins	NHL	15	7	9	16	0	23	6	10	16	11
1988–89	Boston Bruins	NHL	62	16	46	62	12	10	4	9	13	21
1989–90	Boston Bruins	NHL	55	24	38	62	4	18	3	19	22	2
1990–91	Boston Bruins	NHL	77	26	66	92	8	18	4	18	22	11
1991–92	Boston Bruins	NHL	53	12	39	51	20	—	—	—	—	—
1991–92	St. Louis Blues	NHL	25	6	30	36	2	6	0	6	6	0
1992–93	St. Louis Blues	NHL	84	24	82	106	12	11	2	9	11	0
1993–94	St. Louis Blues	NHL	69	16	68	84	24	4	1	3	4	0
1994–95	St. Louis Blues	NHL	8	2	5	7	0	—	—	—	—	—
1994–95	San Jose Sharks	NHL	27	5	15	20	10	11	3	4	7	4
1995–96	San Jose Sharks	NHL	71	13	49	62	26	—	—	—	—	—
1995–96	Winnipeg Jets	NHL	13	7	13	20	0	6	1	2	3	0
1996–97	Phoenix Coyotes	NHL	77	15	38	53	26	7	0	3	3	4
1997–98	Phoenix Coyotes	NHL	68	10	43	53	12	6	0	3	3	0
1998–99	Tampa Bay Lightning	NHL	38	4	18	22	10	—	—	—	—	—
1998–99	New York Islanders	NHL	18	1	4	5	4	—	—	—	—	—
NHL totals			760	188	563	751	170	120	24	86	110	53

=== International ===
Year	Team	Event	GP	G	A	Pts	PIM
1985	United States	WJC	7	4	2	6	0
1986	United States	WJC	3	1	1	2	2
1987	United States	WC	10	1	0	1	0
1988	United States	OG	6	3	1	4	2
1991	United States	CC	8	4	2	6	0
1994	United States	WC	7	2	5	7	0
Junior totals			10	5	3	8	2
Senior totals			31	10	8	18	2

== Awards and honors ==
Award	Year
All-Hockey East First Team	1986–87
AHCA East First-Team All-American	1986–87
Hockey East All-Tournament Team	1987
Named One of Top 100 Best Bruins Players of all Time	2024

Sporting positions
Preceded by Dave Pasin	Boston Bruins first-round draft pick 1986	Succeeded by Glen Wesley
Awards and achievements
Preceded by Scott Harlow	Hockey East Scoring Champion; 1986–87	Succeeded by David Capuano
