= NHL on Global =

Coverage of the 1987 and 1988 Stanley Cup playoffs in Canada

- Also known as: Stanley Cup '87; Stanley Cup '88; NHL Friday
- Genre: Sports
- Created by: Global Television Network; Carling O'Keefe
- Directed by: Henry Pasila
- Presented by: Dave Hodge
- Starring: John Davidson; Dan Kelly; Jim Robson; Jim Tatti
- Country of origin: Canada
- Original language: English
- No. of seasons: 2

Production
- Executive producer: Doug Bonar
- Producer: John Shannon
- Running time: 150 minutes or until the game ends

Original release
- Network: Global
- Release: April 24, 1987 – May 20, 1988

Related
- NHL on CTV

NHL on Global is the de facto name of a television program that broadcast National Hockey League games on the Global Television Network. The program aired during the 1987 and 1988 Stanley Cup playoffs under the titles Stanley Cup '87 and Stanley Cup '88 respectively.

== Background ==
=== About CTV's NHL coverage ===
For the 1984–85 and 1985–86 seasons, CTV aired regular season games on Friday nights (and some Sunday afternoons) as well as partial coverage of the playoffs and Stanley Cup Final. While Molson continued to present Hockey Night in Canada on Saturday nights on CBC, rival brewery Carling O'Keefe began airing Friday Night Hockey on CTV. This marked the first time since 1974–75 that CBC was not the lone over-the-air network broadcaster of the National Hockey League in Canada. CTV's 1965-75 NHL package consisted of Wednesday night games produced by the McLaren advertising agency, which also produced CBC's Saturday night Hockey Night in Canada telecasts.

The deal with CTV was arranged by the Quebec Nordiques (who were owned by Carling O'Keefe) and all 14 U.S.-based NHL clubs, who sought to break Molson's monopoly on NHL broadcasting in Canada. All of the CTV's regular-season telecasts originated from Quebec City or the United States, as Molson shut them out of the other six Canadian buildings (as Carling did to them in Québec City).

The deal ended following the 1985–86 season. CTV's limited access to Canadian-based teams (other than Québec, whose English-speaking fan base was quite small) translated into poor ratings. on the venture.

=== Stanley Cup '87 and Stanley Cup '88 ===
Despite CTV pulling the plug on their two-year-long venture with the NHL, Carling O'Keefe retained their rights (two years were remaining on the contract with or without CTV).

Things became problematic when the 1987 Stanley Cup playoffs opened with Carling O'Keefe still without a network of some sort. The problems arguably peaked when the Montréal-Québec second-round playoff series opened without Molson being allowed to broadcast from Quebec City, leaving Games 3 and 4 off of English-language television altogether. This led to a hastily arranged syndicated package on a chain of stations that would one day form the basis of the Global Television Network. The deal between Carling O'Keefe and the Canwest/Global consortium (with a few CBC and CTV affiliates sprinkled in for good measure) came just in time for game six of this series on April 30.

It must be stressed that Global, technically, didn't become a national network until 1997. During the 1980s, Global consisted of a single station in Toronto with numerous rebroadcast transmitters throughout Ontario, CanWest was a chain of independent stations in Western Canada (and at the time a part-owner of Global), and the two often combined to carry syndicated programming, such as this NHL package and the Canadian Football Network, which would also begin in 1987. These NHL broadcasts were aired under the names Stanley Cup '87 and Stanley Cup '88, before a merger between Carling O'Keefe and Molson (the presenters of Hockey Night in Canada on CBC as previously mentioned) put an end to the competition.

In 1987, coverage also included all five games of the Campbell Conference final between the Edmonton Oilers and Detroit Red Wings, and Games 3–5 of the 1987 Stanley Cup Final between the Oilers and Philadelphia Flyers.

In 1988, coverage included select regular season games on Friday nights and Sunday afternoons from January 31 to the end of the regular season, the Smythe Division final between the Edmonton Oilers and Calgary Flames (which Global carried nationally, except for the Edmonton and Calgary markets, where the CBC retained exclusive rights), game five of the Norris Division final between the Detroit Red Wings and St. Louis Blues, the Campbell Conference final between the Oilers and Red Wings, and the first two games of the Final between the Oilers and Boston Bruins. They also had the rights to games six and seven of the Final, which were not necessary.

Unlike the split CTV/CBC coverage of 1984–85 and 1985–86, the Canwest-Global telecasts were network exclusive, except for game seven of the Stanley Cup Final if it was necessary. When CBC and Global televised game seven of the 1987 Stanley Cup Final, they used separate production facilities and separate on-air talent.

== Commentators ==
- Dan Kelly: lead play-by-play
- John Davidson: lead colour commentator
- Mickey Redmond: fill-in colour commentator
- Dave Hodge: host
- Jim Robson: fill-in play-by-play (called the 1988 Smythe Division final between the Calgary Flames and Edmonton Oilers with John Davidson due to Kelly had commitments to St. Louis Blues regional broadcasts.)
- Jim Tatti: ice level reporter/host

== See also ==
- Allarcom Limited (provided facilities)
- Global Television Network
