= Geoff Smith (ice hockey) =

Canadian ice hockey player

- Born: March 7, 1969 (age 57) Edmonton, Alberta, Canada
- Height: 6 ft 2 in (188 cm)
- Weight: 200 lb (91 kg; 14 st 4 lb)
- Position: Defence
- Shot: Left
- Played for: Edmonton Oilers; Florida Panthers; New York Rangers
- National team: Canada
- NHL draft: 63rd overall, 1987; Edmonton Oilers
- Playing career: 1987–1999

Geoff Arthur Smith (born March 7, 1969) is a Canadian former professional ice hockey player who played in the National Hockey League from 1989 to 1999.

== Playing career ==
Geoff Smith was drafted in the third round, 63rd overall, in the 1987 NHL entry draft by the Edmonton Oilers. He won the Stanley Cup as a rookie with Edmonton in the 1989–90 season. Part way through the 1993–94 NHL season Geoff Smith was traded to the Florida Panthers. Smith remained in the Panthers' organization until he became a New York Ranger in 1997–98. He retired following his second season with the Rangers.

== Coaching career ==
Smith was an assistant coach with the Western Hockey League's Kamloops Blazers. He was also head coach of the Kamloops Storm of the KIJHL in 2011–12. He stepped down as head coach due to work commitments. He later returned to coach two seasons of midget hockey with the Thompson Blazers from 2016-2018.

== Personal ==
Smith is married with two children. He owns a 20-acre farm outside Kamloops, British Columbia where he breeds and sells thoroughbreds.

== Career statistics ==
=== Regular season and playoffs ===
			Regular season					Playoffs
Season	Team	League	GP	G	A	Pts	PIM	GP	G	A	Pts	PIM
1985–86	Edmonton Maple Leafs	AMHL	41	9	21	30	58	—	—	—	—	—
1986–87	St. Albert Saints	AJHL	57	7	28	35	101	—	—	—	—	—
1987–88	University of North Dakota	WCHA	42	4	12	16	34	—	—	—	—	—
1988–89	University of North Dakota	WCHA	9	0	1	1	14	—	—	—	—	—
1988–89	Kamloops Blazers	WHL	32	4	31	35	29	6	1	3	4	12
1989–90	Edmonton Oilers	NHL	74	4	11	15	52	3	0	0	0	0
1990–91	Edmonton Oilers	NHL	59	1	12	13	55	4	0	0	0	0
1991–92	Edmonton Oilers	NHL	74	2	16	18	43	5	0	1	1	6
1992–93	Edmonton Oilers	NHL	78	4	14	18	30	—	—	—	—	—
1993–94	Edmonton Oilers	NHL	21	0	3	3	12	—	—	—	—	—
1993–94	Florida Panthers	NHL	56	1	5	6	38	—	—	—	—	—
1994–95	Florida Panthers	NHL	47	2	4	6	22	—	—	—	—	—
1995–96	Florida Panthers	NHL	31	3	7	10	20	1	0	0	0	2
1996–97	Florida Panthers	NHL	3	0	0	0	2	—	—	—	—	—
1996–97	Carolina Monarchs	AHL	27	3	4	7	20	—	—	—	—	—
1997–98	Hartford Wolf Pack	AHL	59	1	12	13	34	—	—	—	—	—
1997–98	New York Rangers	NHL	15	1	1	2	6	—	—	—	—	—
1998–99	Hartford Wolf Pack	AHL	9	1	4	5	10	—	—	—	—	—
1998–99	New York Rangers	NHL	4	0	0	0	2	—	—	—	—	—
1998–99	Cincinnati Cyclones	IHL	31	3	3	6	20	—	—	—	—	—
1998–99	Worcester IceCats	AHL	25	1	3	4	16	4	0	0	0	4
NHL totals			462	18	73	91	282	13	0	1	1	8

=== International ===
Year	Team	Event	Result	GP	G	A	Pts	PIM
1989	Canada	WJC	4th	7	0	1	1	4
1993	Canada	WC	4th	8	0	0	0	4
Junior totals				7	0	1	1	4
Senior totals				8	0	0	0	4

== Awards and honours ==
Award	Year
WHL
West Second All-Star Team	1987–88
NHL
All-Rookie Team	1990
Stanley Cup (Edmonton Oilers)	1990
