= Glenn Anderson =

Canadian ice hockey player (born 1960)

- Hockey Hall of Fame, 2008
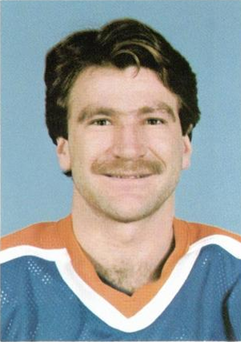
- Anderson with the Edmonton Oilers c. 1984
- Born: October 2, 1960 (age 66) Vancouver, British Columbia, Canada
- Height: 6 ft 1 in (185 cm)
- Weight: 190 lb (86 kg; 13 st 8 lb)
- Position: Right wing
- Shot: Left
- Played for: Edmonton Oilers; Toronto Maple Leafs; New York Rangers; Augsburger Panther; Lukko; St. Louis Blues; HC La Chaux-de-Fonds
- National team: Canada
- NHL draft: 69th overall, 1979; Edmonton Oilers
- Playing career: 1980–1997
Medal record
Representing Canada
Men's ice hockey
Canada Cup
Gold medal – first place	1984 Canada
Gold medal – first place	1987 Canada
World Championships
Silver medal – second place	1989 Sweden

Glenn Chris Anderson (born October 2, 1960) is a Canadian former professional ice hockey player who played 16 seasons in the National Hockey League (NHL) for the Edmonton Oilers, Toronto Maple Leafs, New York Rangers and St. Louis Blues. Anderson was known for performing especially well in important games, which garnered him the reputation of a "money" player. His five playoff overtime goals rank third in NHL history, while his 17 playoff game-winning goals put him fifth all-time. During the playoffs, Anderson accumulated 93 goals, 121 assists, and 214 points, the fourth, ninth, and fourth most in NHL history. Anderson is also first all-time in regular season game-winning goals in Oilers history with 72.

At a young age, Anderson admired the European aspects of the game. He was known to have a liking for participating in international tournaments, more so than his NHL contemporaries. When he was drafted by the Oilers in 1979, he chose to play for Team Canada at the 1980 Winter Olympics instead of immediately joining the Oilers. Anderson won gold at the 1984 and the 1987 Canada Cup and he was a silver medalist at the 1989 Ice Hockey World Championships. During his NHL career, Anderson was part of six Stanley Cup-winning teams (winning his first five as a member of the Oilers and his last as a member of the Rangers), and he was a participant at four All-Star Games. He is one of only seven Oilers players to have won all five Cups in franchise history. In 1996 he played for Team Canada in the Spengler Cup Tournament, often referred to as the Stanley Cup of Europe. Despite having the flu with a high fever, Anderson rallied as soon as his skates were laced and was voted unanimously as the MVP of the tournament. They hoisted the Cup for Canada and took the lounging photo on the ice surrounding the Spengler Cup which was Anderson's idea when the Oilers won their first cup and has since become a tradition. Anderson was inducted into the Hockey Hall of Fame on November 10, 2008, and his jersey number, 9, was retired by the Oilers on January 18, 2009. On December 11, 2023, Anderson was named head coach and general manager of the Powell River Kings of the BCHL.

== Background ==
Anderson was born on October 2, 1960, in Vancouver, and raised in Burnaby, British Columbia. His father, Magnus, was a Norwegian immigrant and his mother, Anne, was of Ukrainian origin. He has two brothers (Allan and David) and a sister (Pam). As a young child, Anderson did not enjoy the game of ice hockey. His first-ever goal was in his own net. By the age of 12 he felt he had a gift and honed his skills as his love of the game increased with his joy of powerful skating. As a youth, he and teammate Ken Berry played in the 1972 Quebec International Pee-Wee Hockey Tournament with a minor ice hockey team from Burnaby.

Growing up, Anderson's hockey idol was his favourite player, Alexander Yakushev of the Soviet team, whom he had watched during the 1972 Summit Series. Anderson eventually produced the one hour acclaimed documentary "To Russia With Love", released in September 2012, about the way Russia changed the Canadian ice hockey game.

== Playing career ==
=== Early career ===
Anderson began his junior hockey career with the Bellingham Blazers of the British Columbia Junior Hockey League (BCJHL) during the 1977–78 season. In 64 games, Anderson recorded 62 goals, 69 assists, and 131 points, the third-most goals and eighth-most points in the league. To top off his lone season in the BCJHL, he was named to the league's Second All-Star Team.

In 1978–79, Anderson was recruited to play for the hockey team of the University of Denver in the National Collegiate Athletic Association (NCAA) by Marshall Johnston, the university team's head coach. Anderson played in 41 games and led the team in points with 55.

In the 1979 NHL entry draft, Anderson was drafted 69th overall by the Edmonton Oilers of the National Hockey League (NHL). He opted to play for Team Canada during the 1980 Winter Olympics in Lake Placid. Father David Bauer, in charge of the national team program, accepted Anderson. Father Bauer's influence on Anderson was significant as he would cite him as a major reason for his later success. The team toured the world playing different opponents in preparation for the Olympics. The practice Anderson received during this time helped "greatly improve" his skills. Anderson scored four points in six games during the tournament.

=== Edmonton Oilers (1980–1991) ===
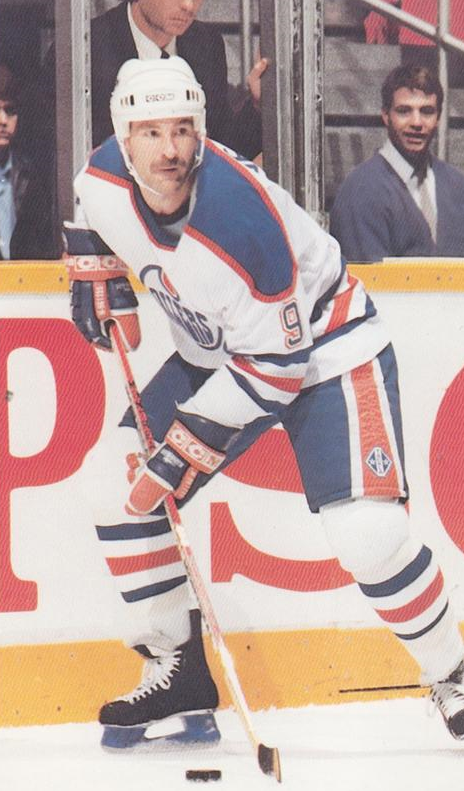
Glenn Anderson in 1989.

The Canadian National Team program was discontinued in the fall of 1980. Facing a choice of whether to rejoin the University of Denver or to join the Oilers, Anderson chose the latter. Making his professional debut with the Oilers, Anderson recorded 30 goals, 23 assists, and 53 points in 58 games in his first season. The Oilers made the playoffs that year and defeated the Montreal Canadiens in the preliminary round, three games to none. This was deemed a huge upset since the Canadiens had finished eleven spots higher than the Oilers in the overall standings. The Oilers moved on to the quarter-finals where they were defeated in six games by the eventual Stanley Cup champions, New York Islanders. During the playoff run, Anderson scored 12 points in 9 games, establishing himself as a "fierce" playoff performer. Anderson's sophomore season saw him record career highs in both assists and points with 67 and 105, respectively. His team jumped from fourth place to first place in the Smythe Division. In the playoffs, the Oilers were the victims of one of the biggest upsets in hockey history.

In the following season, Anderson tallied 48 goals and 56 assists for a total of 104 points to help the Oilers remain atop their division. In the playoffs, the Oilers managed to advance to the Stanley Cup Final for the first time in franchise history. Anderson and his team were matched up against the Islanders who were looking for a fourth consecutive Stanley Cup victory. During the Final, Anderson had several noted run-ins with Islanders goaltender Billy Smith. During game one, a slash on Anderson's knee earned Smith a two-minute slashing penalty. In game four, when the two crashed into each other, Smith's dive resulted in referee Andy Van Hellemond handing a five-minute penalty to Anderson. The season ended in disappointment for the Oilers as they were defeated in four games in a best of seven series. Anderson's team would cite the loss as a valuable lesson in their quest for their first Stanley Cup.

The Oilers again repeated as division champions in 1983–84. Anderson set a career high in goals with 54 and he made his first All-Star Game appearance. In the playoffs, the Oilers made their second consecutive Finals appearance. Once again, Anderson and his team faced the Islanders who were now looking to become the second team in NHL history to win five consecutive Stanley Cups. This time though, the Oilers emerged victorious in five games. This marked the end of the Islanders' dynasty and the beginning of the Oilers' dynasty. Anderson scored 17 points in the playoffs.

At the beginning of the 1984–85 season, Anderson signed an eight-year contract with the Oilers. Anderson recorded 42 goals and 81 points and once more his team was the division champions. Anderson was also selected to play in the All-Star Game. For the third straight season, the Oilers reached the Finals. The Oilers defeated their opponent, the Philadelphia Flyers, in five games. Anderson set a career-high in assists with 16 during the playoff run. The 1985–86 season saw Anderson score 54 goals, and 48 assists, adding up to 102 points. This was the second time Anderson had reached the 50-goal plateau in his career and the third time he had reached the 100-point plateau. He was also selected to play in his third consecutive All-Star Game. For the fifth consecutive season, the Oilers sat atop the Smythe Division. However, the Oilers were eliminated in the division finals by the Calgary Flames on an own goal by defenceman Steve Smith. The loss did not seem to faze Anderson and his team, as they won their third Cup the next season by beating the Flyers once again, but this time in seven games. Anderson set career highs in goals (14), points (27) and PIM (59) during the playoff run.

The Oilers failed to win the division title in 1987–88 for the first time since the 1981–82 season, as they finished runner-up to the Calgary Flames. Anderson scored 88 points during the season and he was selected to play in the All-Star Game. During the 1988 playoffs, Anderson's friend, George Varvis, died after having a heart attack in Anderson's pool. His friend's death inspired his on-ice production. He scored 9 goals and 16 assists for a total of 25 points to help the Oilers win their fourth Cup. His 16 assists tied a career-high. After being eliminated from the playoffs, Anderson chose to play for Team Canada at the World Championships in Sweden.

Looking to rebound after a disappointing season, Anderson and his team made a surprise appearance in the Finals. The Oilers defeated their opponents, the Boston Bruins, in five games to win their fifth Stanley Cup. Anderson scored 22 points and became one of only seven players to be a part of the entire Oilers dynasty. Wanting to rebuild the team with a younger core, the Oilers were involved in a blockbuster trade before the start of the 1991–92 season with the Toronto Maple Leafs that included seven players. Anderson, along with Grant Fuhr and Craig Berube, were sent to Toronto in exchange for Scott Thornton, Vincent Damphousse, Luke Richardson, Peter Ing and future considerations.

During his time with the Oilers, Anderson scored 417 goals, 489 assists, and 906 points, ranking him third, fourth, and fourth most respectively in franchise history. His 183 playoff points are fourth all-time in franchise history and his 126 powerplay goals are the most in franchise history.

=== Late career (1991–1997) ===
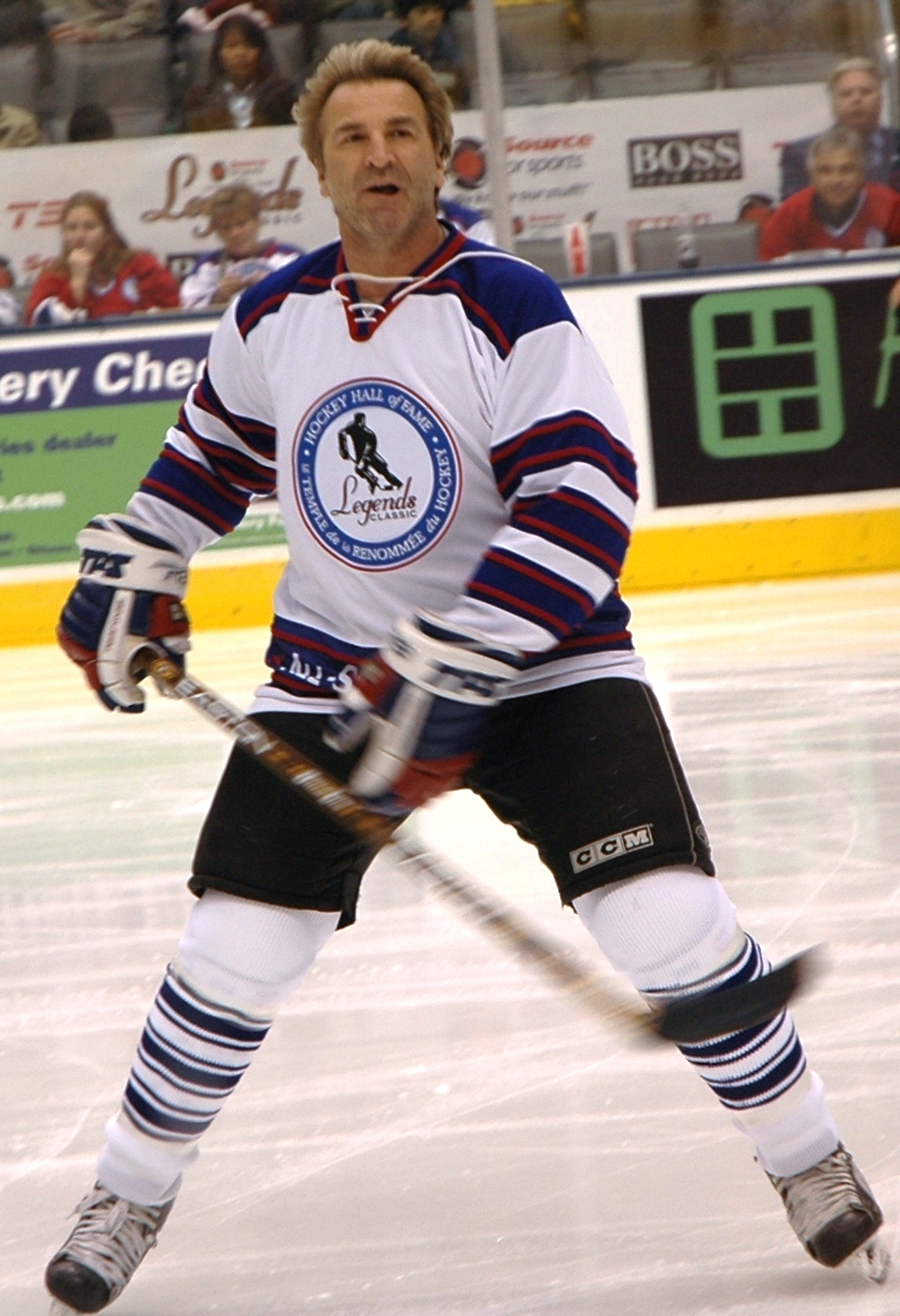
Anderson in 2008

Anderson spent two seasons and part of another with the Maple Leafs. He recorded consecutive 20-goal seasons and he reached the career milestone of 1000 points with them. During the Maple Leafs playoff run in 1992–93, Anderson recorded 18 points in 21 games, including an overtime goal in Game 5 of the Western Conference Finals against the Kings, which gave the Leafs a 3–2 series lead but turned out to be their last win of the season.

In 1993–94, Anderson played 73 games with the Maple Leafs before being traded to the New York Rangers for Mike Gartner. In New York, Anderson was reunited with many of his former teammates from his days in Edmonton. The Rangers featured six former Oilers, including future Hall of Famer and Anderson's long-time friend and linemate Mark Messier. The Rangers qualified for the playoffs and were able to advance to the Finals. Matched up against the Vancouver Canucks, the Rangers defeated them in seven games. This was the Rangers' first Stanley Cup victory since 1940. After being held scoreless in the previous rounds, Anderson scored three playoff goals in the Finals, two of them being game-winners. This would be Anderson's sixth Stanley Cup victory.

Due to the 1994–95 NHL lock-out, Anderson went to Europe to play hockey. He played with the Augsburger Panther of the Deutsche Eishockey Liga in Germany and the Lukko Rauma of the SM-liiga in Finland, as well as the Canadian National Team. After the lock-out was resolved, Anderson signed as a free agent with the St. Louis Blues and played 42 regular season and playoff games combined. At the end of the season, Anderson did not re-sign with the Blues. After playing part of the next season with Augsburger and the National Team again, Anderson signed with the Canucks as a free agent. His reasons for joining the team were because of former Oiler teammate Esa Tikkanen already playing there and a desire to finish his career in his hometown. However, Anderson never played for the Canucks as the Oilers picked him up on re-entry waivers. Anderson expressed his disappointment at these turn of events, as he wanted to play in Vancouver instead. He spent 17 games with the Oilers, before being put on waivers that same season. The Blues claimed him and he spent his last days in the NHL with them. The 1996–97 season saw Anderson return to Europe and play with HC La Chaux-de-Fonds of the National League A in Switzerland and with Bolzano HC of the Alpenliga in Italy.

== International career ==
Anderson was known to have a liking for participating in international competitions. His first test at the international stage was during the 1980 Winter Olympics in Lake Placid, New York. Canada finished sixth in the tournament while Anderson scored four points in six games. Later on, Anderson credited the practice he received in preparation for the Olympics as a key to his future success in the NHL.

Anderson was chosen to participate in the 1984 Canada Cup. The roster included eight of Anderson's teammates from the Edmonton Oilers. Canada advanced to the finals and defeated Sweden 2–0 in a best of three series to win the Cup. Anderson scored five points during the tournament. The 1987 Canada Cup also saw Anderson participate. Once more, Canada reached the finals, but this time they were up against the Soviet Union. The finals required all three games as Canada defeated the Soviet Union. The first two games needed overtime and all three had a final score of 6–5. Anderson recorded three points during the tournament.

In 1989, Anderson played at the Ice Hockey World Championships for the first time. With four points in six games, Anderson helped Canada win the silver medal, as the Soviets took home the gold. Three years later, Anderson made his second and final appearance at the World Ice Hockey Championships, this time in Czechoslovakia. Canada was eliminated by Finland in the quarterfinals by a score of 4–3. Anderson registered three points during the tournament.

Wanting to participate in the Olympics again, Anderson did what he could to play at the 1994 Winter Olympics in Lillehammer, Norway. He negotiated a clause with his team, the Toronto Maple Leafs, to grant him the right to play for Team Canada. The league instituted a new policy, later stating, that only players with less than one year of National Hockey League experience could join the Olympics and therefore Anderson was told on his way to Norway, that he would not play in the NHL if he chose to play in the Olympics. He did not get on the plane. The league's decision caused outrage in Canada. Canada won silver as they lost the gold medal game to Sweden. The NHL released its players for the following games in Nagano.

== Playing style ==
"He was the kind of player who, the bigger the game, the better he performed"

— Former Oilers coach and general manager Glen Sather on Anderson's knack for scoring timely goals in important games.

Anderson was noted for his aggressive "to the net" playing style, typifying the NHL power forward in the early 1980s. He credits coach Clare Drake's drills during his time with the Olympic team for his love of driving the net. He also liked to stay behind the net and pass to his teammates in front of the goal for scoring chances. Noted as a "money" player, Anderson was able to elevate his game in high-pressure situations. He scored five playoff overtime goals and 17 playoff game-winning goals, good for third and fifth all-time in NHL history. During the playoffs, Anderson accumulated 93 goals, 121 assists, and 214 points, the fourth, ninth and fourth most in NHL history. In addition, his 72 regular season game-winning goals with the Oilers put him first all-time in franchise history.

Anderson was inducted into the Hockey Hall of Fame on November 10, 2008, in the players category. His jersey number 9 was retired on January 18, 2009, by the Oilers, before a game against the Phoenix Coyotes. The date for Anderson's number retirement was specifically selected because his former Oilers teammates, Wayne Gretzky and Grant Fuhr, were serving as the Coyotes' head coach and goaltending coach respectively at the time.

Anderson resides in Manhattan, New York with his wife Susan, and their daughter, Autumn. He is retired but teaches and runs fantasy camps, which give fans a chance to play hockey alongside him. Anderson also appears as a commentator and analyst for many programs as well as the New York Rangers.

Anderson was a participant in season one of Battle of the Blades. Anderson and his partner, Isabelle Brasseur, were the second pair to be eliminated from the competition. For their efforts, Brasseur's charity, the Heart and Stroke Foundation of Canada, and Anderson's charity, the Cross Cancer Institute, each received a $12,500 donation. Anderson or “Andy” as his hockey team brothers call him, did not shave the toe pick down on the figure skates as most of the hockey players had done and he tripped on it trying to be authentic despite never having skated on figure skates.

== Career statistics ==
=== Regular season and playoffs ===
			Regular season					Playoffs
Season	Team	League	GP	G	A	Pts	PIM	GP	G	A	Pts	PIM
1977–78	Bellingham Blazers	BCJHL	64	62	69	131	46	—	—	—	—	—
1977–78	New Westminster Bruins	WCHL	1	0	1	1	2	—	—	—	—	—
1978–79	University of Denver	WCHA	41	26	29	55	58	—	—	—	—	—
1979–80	Canada	Intl	49	21	21	42	46	—	—	—	—	—
1979–80	Seattle Breakers	WHL	7	5	5	10	4	2	0	1	1	0
1980–81	Edmonton Oilers	NHL	58	30	23	53	24	9	5	7	12	12
1981–82	Edmonton Oilers	NHL	80	38	67	105	71	5	2	5	7	8
1982–83	Edmonton Oilers	NHL	72	48	56	104	70	16	10	10	20	32
1983–84	Edmonton Oilers	NHL	80	54	45	99	65	19	6	11	17	33
1984–85	Edmonton Oilers	NHL	80	42	39	81	69	18	10	16	26	38
1985–86	Edmonton Oilers	NHL	72	54	48	102	90	10	8	3	11	14
1986–87	Edmonton Oilers	NHL	80	35	38	73	65	21	14	13	27	59
1987–88	Edmonton Oilers	NHL	80	38	50	88	58	19	9	16	25	49
1988–89	Edmonton Oilers	NHL	79	16	48	64	93	7	1	2	3	8
1989–90	Edmonton Oilers	NHL	73	34	38	72	107	22	10	12	22	20
1990–91	Edmonton Oilers	NHL	74	24	31	55	59	18	6	7	13	41
1991–92	Toronto Maple Leafs	NHL	72	24	33	57	100	—	—	—	—	—
1992–93	Toronto Maple Leafs	NHL	76	22	43	65	117	21	7	11	18	31
1993–94	Toronto Maple Leafs	NHL	73	17	18	35	50	—	—	—	—	—
1993–94	New York Rangers	NHL	12	4	2	6	12	23	3	3	6	42
1994–95	Augsburger Panther	DEL	5	6	2	8	10	—	—	—	—	—
1994–95	Lukko	SM-I	4	1	1	2	0	—	—	—	—	—
1994–95	Canada	Intl	26	11	8	19	40	—	—	—	—	—
1994–95	St. Louis Blues	NHL	36	12	14	26	37	6	1	1	2	49
1995–96	Augsburger Panther	DEL	9	5	3	8	48	—	—	—	—	—
1995–96	Canada	Intl	11	4	4	8	39	—	—	—	—	—
1995–96	Edmonton Oilers	NHL	17	4	6	10	27	—	—	—	—	—
1995–96	St. Louis Blues	NHL	15	2	2	4	6	11	1	4	5	6
1996–97	HC La Chaux–de–Fonds	NDA	23	14	35	49	43	—	—	—	—	—
1996–97	Bolzano HC	AL	6	9	14	23	0	—	—	—	—	—
NHL totals			1,129	498	601	1,099	1,120	225	93	121	214	442

=== International ===
Year	Team	Event	GP	G	A	Pts	PIM
1980	Canada	OLY	6	2	2	4	4
1984	Canada	CC	8	1	4	5	16
1987	Canada	CC	7	2	1	3	4
1989	Canada	WC	6	2	2	4	4
1992	Canada	WC	6	2	1	3	16
Senior totals			33	9	10	19	44

1996 Spengler Cup in Davos, Switzerland

== Awards ==
BCJHL

Award	Year(s)
Second all-star team	1978

NHL

Award	Year(s)
All-Star Game	1984, 1985, 1986, 1988
Stanley Cup	1984, 1985, 1987, 1988, 1990 (Edmonton) 1994 (NY Rangers)
