= Allen Pedersen =

Canadian ice hockey player (born 1965)

- Born: January 13, 1965 (age 61) Fort Saskatchewan, Alberta, Canada
- Height: 6 ft 5 in (196 cm)
- Weight: 205 lb (93 kg; 14 st 9 lb)
- Played for: Boston Bruins; Minnesota North Stars; Hartford Whalers
- NHL draft: 102nd overall, 1983; Boston Bruins
- Playing career: 1985–1995

Allen Bentley Pedersen (born January 13, 1965) is a Canadian former professional ice hockey player who played 428 regular season games in the National Hockey League with the Boston Bruins, Minnesota North Stars, and Hartford Whalers.

Pedersen was a dependable, shot blocking, stay-at-home defencemen. He scored a total of 5 goals and 36 assists during his NHL career. He scored 0 points in 64 playoff games, the most games without a point in an NHL playoff career. He still holds the record for the most consecutive games played without scoring a goal - 273 (November 12, 1986, to February 4, 1990).

Pederson is now hockey director at the Monument Ice Arena in Monument, Colorado.

== Career statistics ==
			Regular season					Playoffs
Season	Team	League	GP	G	A	Pts	PIM	GP	G	A	Pts	PIM
1982–83	Medicine Hat Tigers	WHL	63	3	10	13	49	5	0	0	0	7
1983–84	Medicine Hat Tigers	WHL	44	0	11	11	47	14	0	2	2	24
1984–85	Medicine Hat Tigers	WHL	72	6	16	22	66	10	0	0	0	9
1985–86	Moncton Golden Flames	AHL	59	1	8	9	39	3	0	0	0	0
1986–87	Boston Bruins	NHL	79	1	11	12	71	4	0	0	0	4
1987–88	Boston Bruins	NHL	78	0	6	6	90	21	0	0	0	34
1988–89	Boston Bruins	NHL	51	0	6	6	69	10	0	0	0	2
1989–90	Boston Bruins	NHL	68	1	2	3	71	21	0	0	0	41
1990–91	Boston Bruins	NHL	57	2	6	8	107	8	0	0	0	10
1990–91	Maine Mariners	AHL	15	0	6	6	18	2	0	1	1	2
1991–92	Minnesota North Stars	NHL	29	0	1	1	10	—	—	—	—	—
1992–93	Hartford Whalers	NHL	59	1	4	5	60	—	—	—	—	—
1993–94	Hartford Whalers	NHL	7	0	0	0	9	—	—	—	—	—
1993–94	Springfield Indians	AHL	45	2	4	6	28	3	0	1	1	6
1994–95	Atlanta Knights	IHL	71	0	5	5	61	5	0	0	0	2
NHL totals			428	5	36	41	487	64	0	0	0	91
