= Moe Lemay =

Canadian ice hockey player (1962–2024)

- Born: February 18, 1962 Saskatoon, Saskatchewan, Canada
- Died: October 18, 2024 (aged 62)
- Height: 5 ft 11 in (180 cm)
- Weight: 185 lb (84 kg; 13 st 3 lb)
- Position: Left wing
- Shot: Left
- Played for: Vancouver Canucks; Edmonton Oilers; Boston Bruins; Winnipeg Jets
- NHL draft: 105th overall, 1981; Vancouver Canucks
- Playing career: 1982–2000

Maurice Lemay (February 18, 1962 – October 18, 2024) was a Canadian professional ice hockey player who played 317 games in the National Hockey League. He played for the Vancouver Canucks, Edmonton Oilers, Boston Bruins and Winnipeg Jets. Lemay won the Stanley Cup with Edmonton in 1987. He moved to Europe in 1989 and spent several years playing in the 2nd Bundesliga, the second-tier league in Germany, before retiring in 2000.

Lemay was born in Saskatoon, Saskatchewan. As a youth, he played in the 1975 Quebec International Pee-Wee Hockey Tournament with a minor ice hockey team from South Ottawa. He died on October 18, 2024, at the age of 62.

== Career statistics ==
=== Regular season and playoffs ===
			Regular season					Playoffs
Season	Team	League	GP	G	A	Pts	PIM	GP	G	A	Pts	PIM
1978–79	Ottawa Junior Canadiens	Midget	80	54	82	136	55	—	—	—	—	—
1979–80	Ottawa 67s	OMJHL	62	16	23	39	20	10	2	3	5	19
1980–81	Ottawa 67s	OHL	63	32	45	77	102	7	3	5	8	17
1981–82	Ottawa 67s	OHL	62	68	70	138	48	17	9	19	28	18
1981–82	Vancouver Canucks	NHL	5	1	2	3	0	—	—	—	—	—
1982–83	Vancouver Canucks	NHL	44	11	9	20	41	—	—	—	—	—
1982–83	Fredericton Express	AHL	26	7	8	15	6	9	0	2	2	10
1983–84	Vancouver Canucks	NHL	56	12	18	30	38	4	0	0	0	12
1983–84	Fredericton Express	AHL	23	9	7	16	22	—	—	—	—	—
1984–85	Vancouver Canucks	NHL	74	21	31	52	68	—	—	—	—	—
1985–86	Vancouver Canucks	NHL	48	16	15	31	92	—	—	—	—	—
1986–87	Vancouver Canucks	NHL	52	9	17	26	128	—	—	—	—	—
1986–87	Edmonton Oilers	NHL	10	1	2	3	36	9	2	1	3	11
1987–88	Edmonton Oilers	NHL	4	0	0	0	2	—	—	—	—	—
1987–88	Nova Scotia Oilers	AHL	39	14	25	39	89	—	—	—	—	—
1987–88	Boston Bruins	NHL	2	0	0	0	0	15	4	2	6	32
1987–88	Maine Mariners	AHL	11	5	6	11	14	3	2	1	3	22
1988–89	Boston Bruins	NHL	12	0	0	0	23	—	—	—	—	—
1988–89	Maine Mariners	AHL	13	6	2	8	32	—	—	—	—	—
1988–89	Winnipeg Jets	NHL	10	1	0	1	14	—	—	—	—	—
1988–89	Moncton Hawks	AHL	16	9	11	20	21	10	3	6	9	25
1989–90	Zürcher SC	NLA	15	10	12	22	18	—	—	—	—	—
1989–90	EC KAC	AUT	19	9	5	14	26	—	—	—	—	—
1989–90	Canadian National Team	Intl	4	0	3	3	0	—	—	—	—	—
1990–91	ECD Sauerland	GER-2	47	42	73	115	74	—	—	—	—	—
1991–92	ECD Sauerland	GER-2	37	30	47	77	72	8	5	11	16	9
1992–93	EC Hannover	GER-2	48	38	48	86	82	—	—	—	—	—
1993–94	EC Hannover	GER-2	30	14	15	29	95	—	—	—	—	—
1994–95	ETC Timmendorfer Strand	GER-2	17	14	20	34	47	—	—	—	—	—
1995–96	EC Bad Nauheim	GER-2	22	11	12	23	36	—	—	—	—	—
1996–97	Wedemark Scorpions	DEL	38	8	9	17	60	6	0	2	2	35
1997–98	EC Bad Nauheim	GER-2	29	14	26	40	36	—	—	—	—	—
1997–98	Braunlager EHC/Harz	GER-2	15	15	18	33	30	4	1	3	4	8
1998–99	Braunlager EHC/Harz	GER-2	54	19	27	46	98	4	1	2	3	8
1999–00	Hamburg Crocodiles	GER-2	14	0	2	2	16	—	—	—	—	—
GER-2 totals			313	197	288	485	586	16	7	16	23	25
NHL totals			317	72	94	166	442	28	6	3	9	55

=== International ===
Year	Team	Event	GP	G	A	Pts	PIM
1982	Canada	WJC	7	2	0	2	4
Junior totals			7	2	0	2	4
