= Greg Johnston (ice hockey) =

Canadian ice hockey player

- Born: January 14, 1965 (age 61) Barrie, Ontario, Canada
- Height: 6 ft 1 in (185 cm)
- Weight: 200 lb (91 kg; 14 st 4 lb)
- Position: Right wing
- Shot: Right
- Played for: Boston Bruins; Toronto Maple Leafs; Iserlohn Roosters; Kassel Huskies; Berlin Capitals; MODO Hockey Ornskoldsvik; Munich Barons
- NHL draft: 42nd overall, 1983; Boston Bruins
- Playing career: 1985–2002

Gregory Nelson Johnston (born January 14, 1965) is a Canadian former professional ice hockey defenceman.

== Early life ==
Johnston was born in Barrie, Ontario. As a youth, he played in the 1977 Quebec International Pee-Wee Hockey Tournament with a minor ice hockey team from Barrie.

== Career ==
Johnston played 187 games in the NHL, most of them for the Boston Bruins, but also a few for the Toronto Maple Leafs. He has also played in the AHL for various teams, and in Europe for various teams in Germany's DEL and Sweden's Elitserien.

== Career statistics ==
			Regular season					Playoffs
Season	Team	League	GP	G	A	Pts	PIM	GP	G	A	Pts	PIM
1981–82	Barrie Colts	COJHL	9	3	3	6	10	—	—	—	—	—
1982–83	Toronto Marlboros	OHL	58	18	19	37	58	4	1	0	1	4
1983–84	Toronto Marlboros	OHL	57	38	35	73	67	9	4	2	6	13
1983–84	Boston Bruins	NHL	15	2	1	3	2	—	—	—	—	—
1984–85	Toronto Marlboros	OHL	42	22	28	50	55	5	1	3	4	4
1984–85	Hershey Bears	AHL	3	1	0	1	0	—	—	—	—	—
1984–85	Boston Bruins	NHL	6	0	0	0	0	—	—	—	—	—
1985–86	Boston Bruins	NHL	20	0	2	2	0	—	—	—	—	—
1985–86	Moncton Golden Flames	AHL	60	19	26	45	56	10	4	6	10	4
1986–87	Boston Bruins	NHL	76	12	15	27	79	4	0	0	0	0
1987–88	Boston Bruins	NHL	—	—	—	—	—	3	0	1	1	2
1987–88	Maine Mariners	AHL	75	21	32	53	106	10	6	4	10	23
1988–89	Boston Bruins	NHL	57	11	9	20	32	10	1	0	1	6
1988–89	Maine Mariners	AHL	15	5	7	12	31	—	—	—	—	—
1989–90	Boston Bruins	NHL	9	1	1	2	6	5	1	0	1	4
1989–90	Maine Marines	AHL	52	16	26	42	45	—	—	—	—	—
1990–91	Toronto Maple Leafs	NHL	1	0	0	0	0	—	—	—	—	—
1990–91	Newmarket Saints	AHL	73	32	50	82	54	—	—	—	—	—
1991–92	Toronto Maple Leafs	NHL	3	0	1	1	5	—	—	—	—	—
1991–92	St. John's Maple Leafs	AHL	63	28	45	73	33	16	8	6	14	10
1992–93	ECD Sauerland	Germany2	47	49	59	108	70	—	—	—	—	—
1993–94	ECD Sauerland	Germany2	51	40	60	100	74	—	—	—	—	—
1994–95	Kassel Huskies	DEL	42	17	27	44	26	9	4	6	10	6
1995–96	Kassel Huskies	DEL	49	16	23	39	75	8	0	5	5	12
1996–97	Kassel Huskies	DEL	49	19	22	41	98	10	8	4	12	14
1997–98	Kassel Huskies	DEL	43	7	30	37	69	1	0	0	0	6
1997–98	Kassel Huskies	Euro HL	6	2	2	4	6	—	—	—	—	—
1998–99	Kassel Huskies	DEL	52	11	16	27	28	—	—	—	—	—
1999–00	Berlin Capitals	DEL	56	19	21	40	68	7	1	4	5	14
2000–01	Berlin Capitals	DEL	60	18	26	44	52	5	1	1	2	2
2001–02	Modo Hockey	SHL	13	2	3	5	22	—	—	—	—	—
2001–02	Munich Barons	DEL	38	6	6	12	41	6	0	1	1	8
2011–12	Orillia Tundras	ACH	21	6	10	16	10	4	2	1	3	2
NHL totals			187	26	29	55	124	22	2	1	3	12
