= Don Koharski =

Canadian-American professional ice hockey referee

- Born: December 2, 1955 (age 70); Dartmouth, Nova Scotia
- Occupation: Former NHL referee Currently brand ambassador for Castle Building Centres

Don Koharski (born December 2, 1955) is a retired professional ice hockey referee in the National Hockey League. He resides in Tampa, Florida, with his wife, with whom he has two sons. Starting with the 1994–95 NHL season, he wore uniform number 12, and, since the 1987–88 NHL season, he wore a helmet while refereeing NHL games.

Koharski is a rules analyst on NHL on TNT, and Director of Officiating for the National Lacrosse League.

== Officiating career ==
Koharski began his officiating career in the World Hockey Association in 1975, as a 19-year-old linesman. (He is the final player or official from the WHA to be involved in professional hockey in an on-ice capacity.) In 1976, he was signed by the American Hockey League while working with a local dairy farm, for which he was milking cows. He began his NHL career in 1977 as a linesman, before moving to the referee role in 1980.

Entering the 2005–06 season, Koharski had officiated over 1,400 regular season games, 235 playoff games, thirteen Stanley Cup Finals, two All-Star Games, two Canada Cups, and the 2004 World Cup. He was the league's second-most senior official, behind only referee Kerry Fraser. On April 8, 2006, Koharski reached the 1,500-regular-season-game milestone when he officiated a game between the Pittsburgh Penguins and the Tampa Bay Lightning.

During the NHL player lockout of 2004–05, Koharski officiated a charity game between former players from the United Hockey League, as part of their All-Star Game festivities.

On March 24, 2009, it was announced that Koharski would retire as an NHL referee at the end of the 2008–09 NHL season; however, he will stay on with the NHL in a supervisory or instructional position. Koharski worked his last game on April 9, 2009 between the Washington Capitals and the Tampa Bay Lightning.

In total, Koharski officiated 1,719 regular-season games and 248 playoff games.

=== "The doughnut incident" ===
On May 6, 1988, Koharski got into an infamous shouting match with New Jersey Devils Head Coach Jim Schoenfeld, after Game Three of the Wales (now Eastern) Conference Finals (which the Devils lost to the Boston Bruins, 6-1). Walking off the ice, Koharski apparently stumbled when his skate blade gave out. The referee then accused Schoenfeld of bumping him, which the coach denied:

Koharski: "Oh, you're gone now! You're gone. You won't coach another..."

Schoenfeld: "You fell and you know it. You know you fell. I didn't touch you."

Koharski: "You're gone. You're gone. And I hope it's on tape."

Schoenfeld: "Good, 'cause you fell, you fat pig. Have another doughnut! Have another doughnut!"

The next day, NHL Vice President Bryan O'Neill announced, just hours before Game Four was to be played at Meadowlands Arena, that Schoenfeld was suspended for at least one game pending further investigation. The Devils, however, got in touch with Bergen County Judge James F. Madden to issue an injunction to allow Schoenfeld back in the coach's box, just before the game was scheduled to start. Showing solidarity with Koharski, though, referee Dave Newell and linesmen Ray Scapinello and Gord Broseker refused to work the game, as did backup referee Denis Morel. A sellout crowd was forced to wait over an hour until replacement officials could be found. (Paul McInnis, a manager of a skating rink in Yonkers, New York, took over as referee, with Vin Godelski and Jim Sullivan as linesmen.)

New Jersey won Game Four, 3-1. After a proper hearing was held for Coach Schoenfeld, he was indeed suspended for Game Five (in which Devils' GM Lou Lamoriello made his NHL coaching debut). The Bruins would go on to win the series in seven games, then be swept by the Edmonton Oilers in the Stanley Cup Final.

== Personal life ==
Koharski's son Jamie and brother Terry also worked as referees in various leagues, including the USHL, ECHL and AHL. Jamie retired in 2016 after a 12-season career in the AHL and now serves as an officiating development coach for the ECHL and USA Hockey's Officiating Development Program, while Terry retired from the AHL in 2023. In 2020, Jamie's wife, Liz Sylvia Koharski, became the 17th woman to have her name engraved on the Stanley Cup, due to her role with the Tampa Bay Lightning as an administrative staffer.
