= Barry Fraser =

Canadian former ice hockey executive (1940–2022)

- Born: February 10, 1940; Kirkland Lake, Ontario, Canada
- Died: December 4, 2022 (aged 82); Edmonton, Alberta, Canada
- Occupation: Director of Scouting
- Years active: 1979–2000
- Employer: Edmonton Oilers
- Known for: Scout of the Edmonton Oilers
- Partner: Mariette Carrier-Fraser (divorced)
- Children: Brenda Fraser & Lori Fraser
- Awards: 5 Stanley Cup Wins

Barry Fraser (February 10, 1940 – December 4, 2022) was a Canadian ice hockey executive who was the Director of Scouting for the Edmonton Oilers of the National Hockey League from 1979 to 2000.

== Career ==
Born in Kirkland Lake, Ontario, Fraser attempted a professional hockey career as a player, but his career was cut short, due to knee injuries. He decided to pursue his dreams of being in the National Hockey League as a scout.

Fraser was credited with building the foundation that led to the Oilers' dynasty of 1983–1990. He was present when drafting big-name players, such as Grant Fuhr, Kevin Lowe, Mark Messier, Glenn Anderson, Paul Coffey, and many more, as well as when the Oilers purchased Wayne Gretzky from the Indianapolis Racers. In 1983, the Edmonton Oilers went to the Stanley Cup for the first time. They did not win but proved Fraser a legitimate drafting scout. His name is on the Stanley Cup 5 times with Edmonton in 1984, 1985, 1987, 1988 and 1990.

== Personal life and death ==
After retiring, he resided in Cabo San Lucas, Mexico. He died in Edmonton, Alberta on December 4, 2022, at the age of 82.
