= Derek Laxdal =

Canadian ice hockey player and coach

- Born: February 21, 1966 (age 60) Stonewall, Manitoba, Canada
- Height: 6 ft 2 in (188 cm)
- Weight: 220 lb (100 kg; 15 st 10 lb)
- Position: Right wing
- Shot: Right
- Played for: Toronto Maple Leafs; New York Islanders; Ilves; Humberside Hawks; Nottingham Panthers; Sheffield Steelers
- Current AHL coach: Coachella Valley Firebirds
- Coached for: Idaho Steelheads; Edmonton Oil Kings; Texas Stars; Oshawa Generals
- NHL draft: 151st overall, 1984; Toronto Maple Leafs
- Playing career: 1984–2001

Derek Laxdal (born February 21, 1966) is a Canadian ice hockey coach and former professional right winger.

On July 5, 2024, he became head coach of the Coachella Valley Firebirds of the American Hockey League, following two seasons with the Ontario Hockey League Oshawa Generals. In his last season with the Generals, they were OHL finalists, leading the Eastern Division in the regular season, and losing to Memorial Cup runner ups, the London Knights. His return to the head coaching role came after three seasons as assistant coach of the NHL Dallas Stars.

== Playing career ==
Born and raised in Stonewall, Manitoba, Laxdal was drafted in the eighth round, 151st overall, by the Toronto Maple Leafs in the 1984 NHL entry draft. He completed his second season in the WHL, having joined the 1983 Memorial Cup champion Portland Winter Hawks in his rookie season (which was also spent in the AJHL with the Red Deer Rebels), and then with Brandon Wheat Kings in his home province. He played 67 games in the National Hockey League: 51 over four seasons with the Maple Leafs, and 16 more over two seasons with the New York Islanders. He played in one career Stanley Cup playoff game in 1990, where he recorded two assists. He is the only NHL player to record two points with only one career postseason game played. In an almost 20-year career, he scored points at every level, including a successful four-year stint in the UK between 1995/96 and 1998/99, where he played for the Humberside Hawks (British League), Nottingham Panthers and Sheffield Steelers (Ice Hockey Superleague). He also played in the 1986 World Junior Ice Hockey Championships for Canada, where Canada were silver medalists.

== Coaching career ==
From December 10, 2019, until May 20, 2022, Laxdal was an assistant coach with the Dallas Stars of the National Hockey League. From 2014 to 2019, he was the head coach of the American Hockey League affiliate of the Dallas Stars, the Texas Stars. Previously, he served as head coach of the WHL Edmonton Oil Kings (2010–2014), the ECHL Idaho Steelheads (2005–2010), and in the former Central Hockey League, the Wichita Thunder (2002–2005). In 2007, he was the ECHL John Brophy Coach of the Year, leading the Steelheads to the Kelly Cup championship in the 2006–07 season. He led the Edmonton Oil Kings to WHL titles in 2012 and 2014, winning the 2014 Memorial Cup with the Oil Kings. He was the first coach in the history of the WHL to have three 50-win seasons in a row. Before playing in the UK, he was an assistant playing coach in Roanoke, and in Odessa in his final playing years.

== Career statistics ==
=== Regular season and playoffs ===
			Regular season					Playoffs
Season	Team	League	GP	G	A	Pts	PIM	GP	G	A	Pts	PIM
1982–83	Portland Winter Hawks	WHL	39	4	9	13	27	14	0	2	2	2
1983–84	Brandon Wheat Kings	WHL	70	23	20	43	86	12	0	4	4	10
1984–85	Brandon Wheat Kings	WHL	69	61	41	102	74	—	—	—	—	—
1984–85	Toronto Maple Leafs	NHL	3	0	0	0	6	—	—	—	—	—
1984–85	St. Catharines Saints	AHL	5	3	2	5	2	—	—	—	—	—
1985–86	Brandon Wheat Kings	WHL	42	34	35	69	62	—	—	—	—	—
1985–86	New Westminster Bruins	WHL	18	9	6	15	14	—	—	—	—	—
1985–86	St. Catharines Saints	AHL	7	0	1	1	15	—	—	—	—	—
1986–87	Toronto Maple Leafs	NHL	2	0	0	0	7	—	—	—	—	—
1986–87	Newmarket Saints	AHL	78	24	20	44	69	—	—	—	—	—
1987–88	Toronto Maple Leafs	NHL	5	0	0	0	6	—	—	—	—	—
1987–88	Newmarket Saints	AHL	67	18	25	43	81	—	—	—	—	—
1988–89	Toronto Maple Leafs	NHL	41	9	6	15	65	—	—	—	—	—
1988–89	Newmarket Saints	AHL	34	22	22	44	53	2	0	2	2	5
1989–90	Newmarket Saints	AHL	23	7	8	15	52	—	—	—	—	—
1989–90	New York Islanders	NHL	12	3	1	4	4	1	0	2	2	2
1989–90	Springfield Indians	AHL	28	13	12	25	42	13	8	6	14	47
1990–91	New York Islanders	NHL	4	0	0	0	0	—	—	—	—	—
1990–91	Capital District Islanders	AHL	65	14	25	39	75	—	—	—	—	—
1991–92	Capital District Islanders	AHL	49	7	7	14	61	4	1	1	2	10
1993–94	Ilves	SM-l	17	6	5	11	20	3	1	0	1	4
1994–95	Roanoke Express	ECHL	66	32	24	56	144	8	2	4	6	25
1995–96	Humberside Hawks	BHL	33	29	29	58	163	7	9	4	13	16
1996–97	Nottingham Panthers	BISL	31	14	14	28	54	8	1	3	4	27
1997–98	Nottingham Panthers	BISL	44	24	23	47	103	6	1	3	4	10
1998–99	Sheffield Steelers	BISL	29	9	13	22	32	—	—	—	—	—
1999–00	Sheffield Steelers	BISL	18	3	3	6	20	—	—	—	—	—
1999–00	Odessa Jackalopes	WPHL	46	28	25	53	53	2	0	4	4	4
2000–01	Odessa Jackalopes	WPHL	65	21	23	44	103	11	5	3	8	31
AHL totals			356	108	122	230	450	31	10	10	20	86
NHL totals			67	12	7	19	88	1	0	2	2	2
