= Cam Neely =

Canadian ice hockey player (born 1965)

- Hockey Hall of Fame, 2005
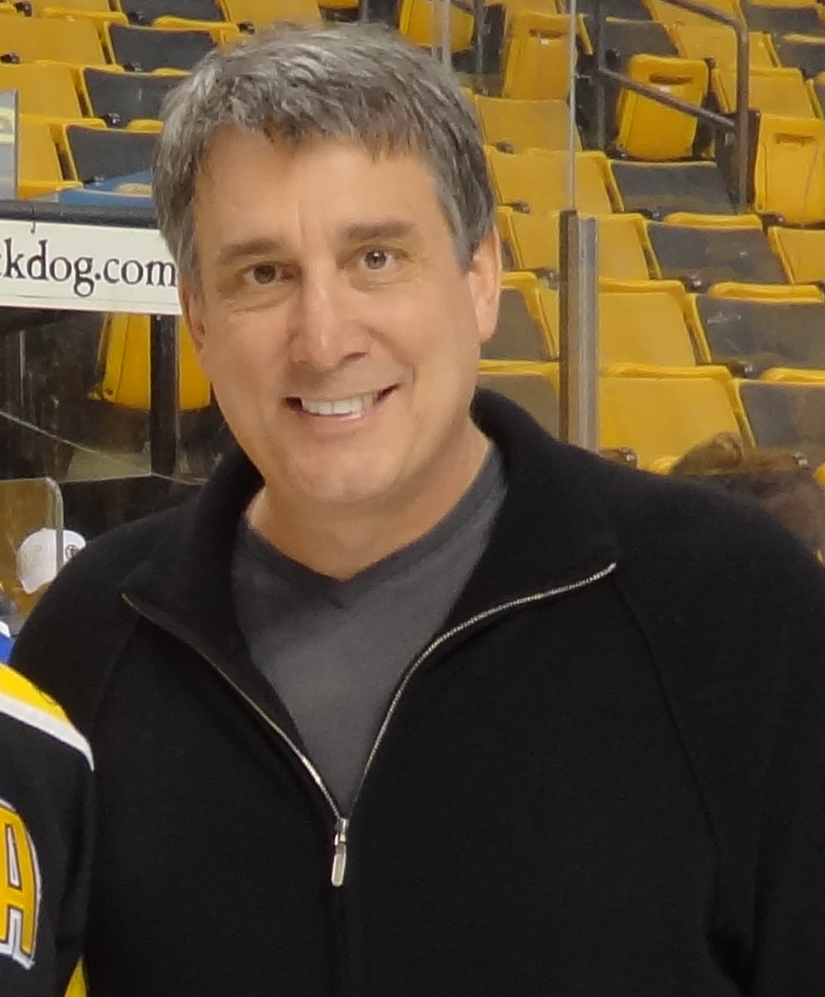
- Neely in 2013
- Born: June 6, 1965 (age 61) Comox, British Columbia, Canada
- Height: 6 ft 1 in (185 cm)
- Weight: 218 lb (99 kg; 15 st 8 lb)
- Position: Right wing
- Shot: Right
- Played for: Vancouver Canucks; Boston Bruins
- NHL draft: 9th overall, 1983; Vancouver Canucks
- Playing career: 1983–1996

Cameron Michael Neely (born June 6, 1965) is a Canadian professional ice hockey executive and former player. He played right winger for 13 seasons in the National Hockey League (NHL) for the Vancouver Canucks and Boston Bruins.

Neely excelled in junior hockey play with the Portland Winter Hawks of the Western Hockey League, which saw him with the Memorial Cup in 1983 with a hat-trick in the championship game. He was selected as the ninth overall pick of the 1983 NHL draft by the Vancouver Canucks. While he immediately made the major league roster that season, he was utilized more on the third line, recording 104 points in 201 games. He was traded to the Boston Bruins in June 1986 for Barry Pederson and a draft pick and immediately made waves for the Bruins in his first season, recording 72 points in 75 games with his first of five consecutive 30-goal seasons. With a hard accurate shot and willingness to engage in physicality with his frame and fists, he was named to the NHL All-Star Game in the next four seasons, which saw him record a 50-goal season in the 1989–90 and 1990–91 seasons.

In the 1991 Stanley Cup playoffs, he suffered devastating injuries to his knee that saw him play 22 combined games over the next two seasons. He returned in the 1993–94 season and scored 50 goals in his 44th game of play that saw him named to the NHL Second All-Star Team for the fourth time and awarded the Bill Masterton Memorial Trophy for his perseverance. In his final two seasons, he recorded 20-goal seasons while playing in 40 games each before retiring due to a degenerative hip condition in 1996 at the age of 31. In 726 games, Neely recorded 395 goals and 299 assists while recording 89 points in 93 playoff games. The Bruins retired his jersey in 2004, and he was inducted into the Hockey Hall of Fame in 2005.

After his playing days ended, he was appointed vice president of the Bruins in 2007 and was promoted to team president in 2010; he was awarded the Lester Patrick Trophy for his contributions to hockey in the United States. Neely won the Stanley Cup when the Bruins won the Stanley Cup Final.

== Early life ==
Cameron Michael Neely was born on June 6, 1965, in Comox, British Columbia, Canada to his parents Michael and Marlene Neely. His father, served in the Royal Canadian Air Force, which led to family relocations during his early years, including a period living in Moose Jaw, Saskatchewan. His family eventually settled in Maple Ridge, British Columbia, where Neely spent most of his childhood and started to get involved in hockey along with avidly watching the Toronto Maple Leafs with his father.

Neely began playing for the Ridge Meadows Minor Hockey program from 1976 to 1981. Along with hockey Neely also played for Ridge Meadows baseball team alongside Larry Walker, from ages 11 to 16.

== Playing career ==
Neely played hockey with the Ridge Meadows Hockey Association for the majority of his minor career, scoring 141 points in 64 games in the 1981-82 season. He was subsequently named to the Maple Ridge honourable people list. He then joined the Portland Winter Hawks of the Western Hockey League. He led the team to the Memorial Cup Championship, becoming the first US-based team to claim the Cup. Neely quickly emerged as a top prospect for the upcoming 1983 NHL entry draft, as he scored 56 goals and 120 points in 72 games. He was then drafted by the Vancouver Canucks ninth overall in the 1983 entry draft. Neely debuted with the Canucks during the 1983–84 season, he scored his first goal in his third game against the Toronto Maple Leafs on October 9, 1983. He finished his rookie season with in 56 appearances, recording 16 goals and 15 assists for 31 points. In his second season, he has his first 20 goal season scoring 39 total points. He then played his final season for Vancouver in the 1985–86 seaosn, which saw a slight dip in scoring with 14 goals and 20 assists in 73 games.

=== Boston Bruins ===
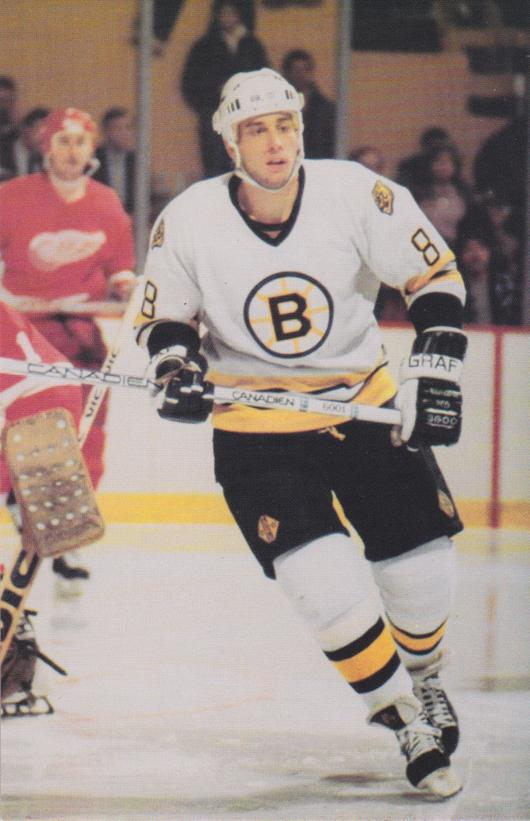
Cam Neely in 1986.

In the 1986 offseason, Neely would be involved in a trade from Vancouver. The departure of Thomas Gradin to the Boston Bruins left the team wanting to sign centre Barry Pederson from the Bruins. Pederson was free to sign with a team, but free agency rules at the time stated that any team signing what would be considered a restricted free agent in the modern sense would have to give compensation to the team who lost their player. Vancouver, as led by general manager Jack Gordon, believed that Pederson would pair well with Patrik Sundström and team head coachTom Watt was not impressed with Neely's defence, seeing him more as a "bash-and-crash forward", while Neely later retorted by stating that he didn't get much ice time to really show his abilities off when behind players such as Stan Smyl and Tony Tanti. With the choice of "either two first-round draft picks or a single pick along with a player off the Canucks’ roster", the Canucks went with the latter choice in trading Neely and a 1987 NHL entry draft first round draft pick (which Boston later used to select Glen Wesley) for Pederson on Neely's 21st birthday of June 6, 1986.

Almost immediately, it became apparent that the Bruins had received the better of the deal. Neely stated that "I was surprised at the trade. I really didn't know what to expect once I got to Boston and had no idea that my career would turn out the way it did for those ten years. From Day One in training camp, I just wanted to get the opportunity to play. The coaches said, 'Let's see what he can do.' As time went by, I got more and more confidence. I never really thought I'd be a 50-goal scorer, but I was given a chance to contribute offensively, not just physically."

In his first full season following the trade, Neely's 36 goals led the club, and his 72 points more than doubled his previous year's performance. In the same season, he also spent 143 minutes in the penalty box. Neely reflected in a 2008 interview the conversation he had with head coach Mike Milbury about his play:

Mike Milbury said, 'I want you to think about what you're doing by putting yourself into the penalty box. If you're going to fight, make sure it's on your terms and not just because someone is challenging you.' He was trying to make me understand who I was going in the box with. He'd say, 'I don't want to take away from you dropping your gloves, but, I don't want you to think about not doing it. I just want you to think about how your reaction affects both their team and our team.' So it got me to thinking a little more about my role. Then, I began going with my instincts more and what felt right at that moment.

Neely's success stemmed largely from his hard, accurate shot, quick release, and his willingness to engage in the more physical aspects of the game. At 6 ft 1 in and 215 lb, Neely was as devastating with his body checks and fists as he was with his goal scoring exploits. He became the archetype of the power forward and earned the nickname "Bam-Bam Cam".

During the 1987–88 season, Neely further showcased his scoring ability when he scored 40+ goals for the first time as he helped the Bruins make it all the way to the Stanley Cup finals where they lost to the Edmonton Oilers. At the end of the season he was named to the Second NHL All-Star team for the first time. Neely then followed this with a 75-point season in 74 games during the 1988–89 season. In the following year, Neely had his best statistical season when he scored 55 goals and 37 assists for 92 points in 76 games while the Bruins returned to the Stanley Cup Final, where they were once again defeated by Edmonton. Neely was then named to the Second NHL All-Star team for a second time.

During the 1990–91 season, Neely had both his second straight 90-point season and once again scored 50+ plus goals. On May 5, 1991, during game 3 of the Prince of Wales Conference Finals, Neely was checked by Ulf Samuelsson, and injured on the play, and was hit again to the knee in game 6. Compounding the situation was that Neely developed myositis ossificans in the injured area. The injury kept him out of all but 22 games of the next two seasons, and he would only play a total of 162 NHL games for the remainder of his career after the hit because of knee trouble. Neely would end up getting revenge on Samuelsson during a game on March 27, 1993 where Neely started “manhandling” Samuelsson and ended up throwing him around like a rag doll.

After only playing a handful of games, the previous two seasons Neely made a comeback for the ages during the 1993–94 season. Limited to 49 games, Neely picked up goals at a prodigious rate, recording seven goals in six games of the opening month of October and 23 in 21 games before the end of 1993 and 46 by the time of March. On March 7, 1994, in his 44th game played (and 66th for the Bruins), he scored two goals with an assist to reach 50 goals for the season. While he did not record an official 50 goals in 50 games (as he did not record his 50th goal in the 50th game of the season), he is the last player to score 50 goals in their first 50 games played in a season. He recorded three assists in his next five games but had his season end after getting entangled with Ken Daneyko against New Jersey on March 19 that saw him twist his knee and tear his right knee ligament. At the end of the year for his intense efforts to come back time and again from his devastating injuries were recognized with his winning of the Masterton Trophy. He was also named to the Second NHL All-Star Team for a fourth and final time.

In one memorable incident in March 1994, the tip of Neely's right pinky finger was cut off through his glove, requiring 10–15 stitches to repair. After sustaining the injury early in the second period, Neely received the stitches and returned to the game later that period. Neely scored an assist, but the Bruins ultimately lost the game against the Devils 2–1. For the rest of his career, he was regularly listed as a healthy scratch in alternate games in order to rest his ailing knee, but it would be a degenerative hip condition that forced Neely to retire after the 1995–96 season at the age of 31.

== Post-playing career ==
Neely with Bruins owner Jermey Jacobs

In November 1998, Neely attempted a comeback after being out of hockey for two years. Neely said this in a 2008 interview about it:

I wish that my lungs felt as good as my hip. If I last four days (of practice) in a row and my hip's barking at me, then that's all she wrote. I know how I felt when I had to retire and I know how I'm feeling now. It's not really how I want to feel. It was fun while I was out there but each day I skated, the pain just kind of lingered a lot longer than I would have liked. I was feeling really good and had started getting some different treatment. I practiced a few times with the Bruins but after some really hard practices, realized there was just no way I could continue.

On September 25, 2007, Neely was appointed vice president of the Boston Bruins. On June 16, 2010, he was promoted to team president. Also in 2010 Neely was awarded the Lester Patrick Trophy for his contributions to hockey in the United States. The 2011 Stanley Cup Final saw the Bruins encounter the Canucks. On June 15, the Bruins played in a Game 7 in a Stanley Cup Final for the first time in franchise history, which saw them prevail 4–0 to win their first championship since 1972 and give Neely his first Stanley Cup ring. He currently is still team president of the Bruins.

He sat on the board of directors of Whistler Blackcomb Holdings Inc., which was created by an IPO by Intrawest Corp. on November 1, 2010. Within that board, he was a member of the Corporate Governance and Nominating Committee. In 2024, Neely was appointed to the advisory board of Frequency Exchange, a company focused on financial technology innovations. On June 24, 2026, Neely appeared on The Tonight Show Starting Jimmy Fallon where he teamed up with Denis Leary to face Tracee Ellis Ross and Jimmy Fallon in the game Password.

Neely also played in the Alumni Game of the 2016 Winter Classic at Gillette Stadium against the Montreal Canadiens Alumni on a Bruins Alumni team including Bourque, Mark Recchi and Terry O'Reilly and coached by, among others, Mike Milbury, Lyndon Byers and Don Cherry.

== Legacy ==
In totality, Neely scored 395 goals with 299 assists for a total of 694 points in 726 games. Only Gretzky, Mario Lemieux, and Brett Hull scored a better goals per game average over the course of an NHL season than Neely did with his 50-goals-in-49-games in the 1993–94 season (despite missing 35 games that season). Neely reached the fifty-goal mark three times, played in five All-Star games, and was named the league's Second Team All-Star at right wing in 1988, 1990, 1991, and 1994. His 0.54 goals per game career average is 10th best all-time for players with at least 700 games played in NHL history.

On January 12, 2004, the Bruins retired Neely's number eight jersey with a formal ceremony. He was the tenth Bruins player to receive the honor.

Neely was inducted into the Hockey Hall of Fame in 2005 and reflected on the matter, stating:

To be honest, I never concerned myself too much with the Hall of Fame, just like I never concerned myself with numbers when I played. I just tried to do my best and work hard. Whether I played well or not was another story.

Neely retired as the all-time goals leader in Stanley Cup playoffs (55) for the Bruins until he was passed by Brad Marchand on April 27, 2024. He ranks eleventh in playoff points for Boston with 87. In 2024 Neely was named to the Boston Bruins All-Centennial Team.

== Personal life ==
Neely was born in Comox, British Columbia and grew up in Maple Ridge, British Columbia. Both of his parents died of cancer. Neely remains active in the Cam Neely Foundation which is run in conjunction with Tufts Medical Center, where patients and their families avail themselves of accommodation at the "Neely House" while undergoing cancer treatments. Since it inception Neely House has provided 36,000 nights of lodging. After his mother died of cancer in 1987 and his father in 1993, he founded the charity in 1995 and that same year asked Denis Leary if he was interested in orchestrating a Boston-based comedy benefit show, which has become the annual Comics Come Home event. All proceeds directly fund the foundation's programs, The event has since raised $17 million. Neely who is a golfer also hosts his own charity golf tournament which has been running since 1995. As of 2025, his foundation has raised over $34 million in donations, directing these funds to sustain operations and expand services that have benefited thousands of families.

Neely has been married to his wife Paulina Neely since 1996 and has two children, a son Jack who was born in 1998, and a daughter Ava who was born in 2000; they reside in Massachusetts. One of Neely's childhood friends is former Major League Baseball (MLB) Hall of Fame right fielder Larry Walker, who himself dreamed of an NHL career as a goaltender. Neely and Walker constantly played against one another to sharpen their skills.

Neely is close friends with actor and activist Michael J. Fox, dating back to the time when Neely was playing for the Canucks. Fox spoke at Neely's number retirement ceremony and was a guest at Neely's Hockey Hall of Fame induction. In June 2025, Fox and Neely collaborated in a video parodying Back to the Future to promote new uniforms for the Bruins.

== Acting career ==
Neely has appeared on Denis Leary's series Rescue Me, playing a hockey-playing firefighter who wreaks havoc during an NYPD vs. FDNY game. He made a cameo in the eighth-season opening episode of Cheers, titled "The Improbable Dream", as a bar patron.

Neely and Lyndon Byers had a cameo for Boston-based band Extreme in their video for the song "Hole Hearted" where they are seen playing a guitar alongside the band. Most famously, Neely portrayed the character of Sea Bass in the Farrelly brothers films Dumb and Dumber, Me, Myself & Irene, and Dumb and Dumber To. He had a small role as himself in the second film of the Mighty Ducks trilogy, D2: The Mighty Ducks. He had a small role as SOC #2 in the 1983 film The Outsiders.

== Career statistics ==
			Regular season					Playoffs
Season	Team	League	GP	G	A	Pts	PIM	GP	G	A	Pts	PIM
1981–82	Ridge Meadows Lightning	Midget	64	73	68	141	134	—	—	—	—	—
1982–83	Portland Winter Hawks	WHL	72	56	64	120	130	14	9	11	20	17
1983–84	Portland Winter Hawks	WHL	19	8	18	26	29	—	—	—	—	—
1983–84	Vancouver Canucks	NHL	56	16	15	31	57	4	2	0	2	2
1984–85	Vancouver Canucks	NHL	72	21	18	39	137	—	—	—	—	—
1985–86	Vancouver Canucks	NHL	73	14	20	34	126	3	0	0	0	6
1986–87	Boston Bruins	NHL	75	36	36	72	143	4	5	1	6	8
1987–88	Boston Bruins	NHL	69	42	27	69	175	23	9	8	17	51
1988–89	Boston Bruins	NHL	74	37	38	75	190	10	7	2	9	8
1989–90	Boston Bruins	NHL	76	55	37	92	117	21	12	16	28	51
1990–91	Boston Bruins	NHL	69	51	40	91	98	19	16	4	20	36
1991–92	Boston Bruins	NHL	9	9	3	12	16	—	—	—	—	—
1992–93	Boston Bruins	NHL	13	11	7	18	25	4	4	1	5	4
1993–94	Boston Bruins	NHL	49	50	24	74	54	—	—	—	—	—
1994–95	Boston Bruins	NHL	42	27	14	41	72	5	2	0	2	2
1995–96	Boston Bruins	NHL	49	26	20	46	31	—	—	—	—	—
NHL totals			726	395	299	694	1,241	93	57	32	89	168

== Awards, honors and achievements ==
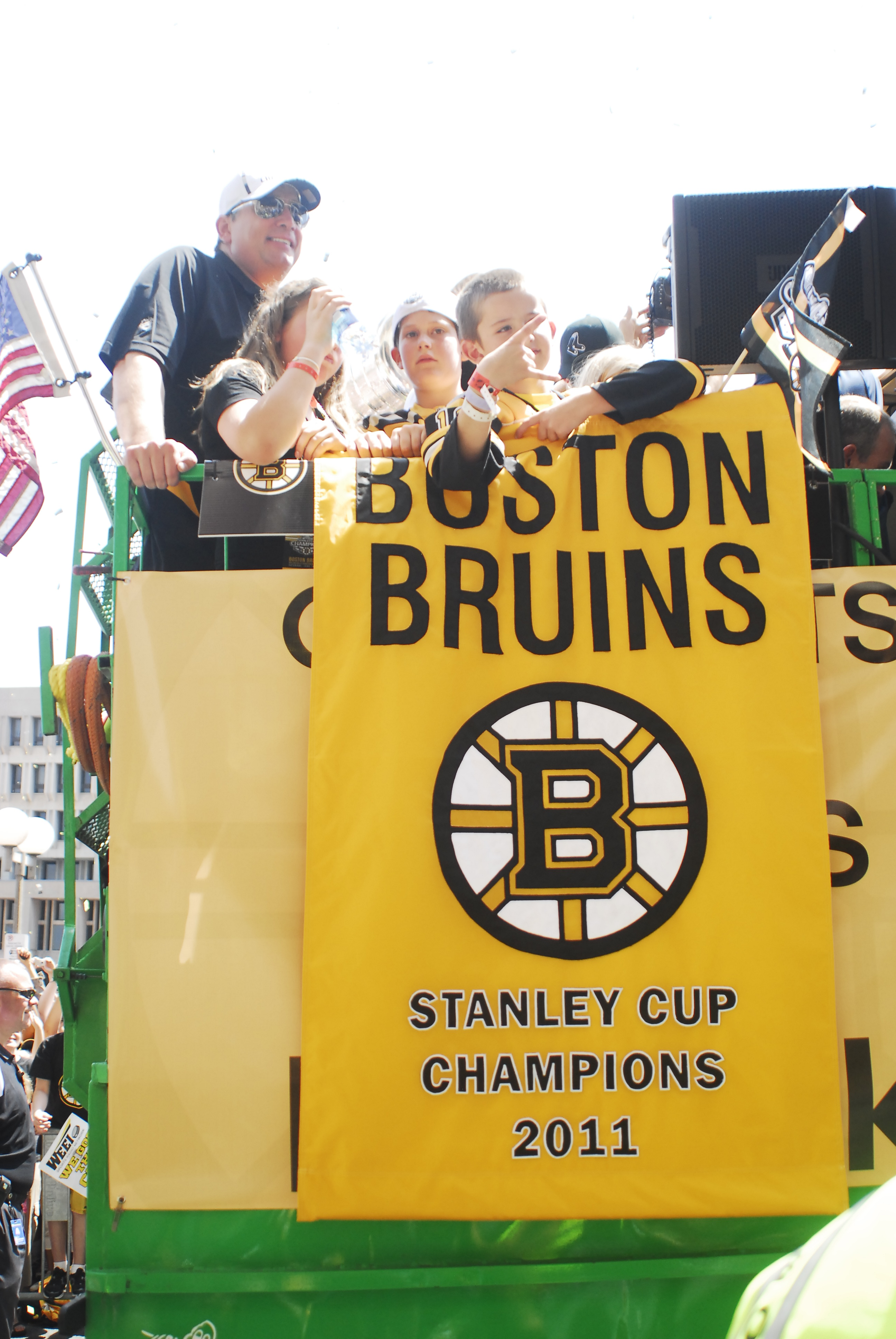
Neely (top left) at the Bruins 2011 Stanley Cup Parade

- CHL Memorial Cup champion — 1983.
- Won the Seventh Player Award — 1987, 1994
- NHL All-Star Game — 1988, 1989, 1990, 1991, 1996
- Bruins Three Stars Awards — 1988, 1989, 1990, 1991, 1994, 1995
- Won the Elizabeth C. Dufresne Trophy — 1988, 1991, 1995
- Named to the NHL Second All-Star team — 1988, 1990, 1991, 1994
- Won the Bill Masterton Memorial Trophy — 1994
- Inducted into the British Columbia Hockey Hall of Fame — 1999
- Inducted into the British Columbia Sports Hall of Fame — 2000
- His #8 jersey number was retired by the Boston Bruins on January 12, 2004.
- In 2004 Neely received the Hockey Legacy Award from The Sports Museum at TD Garden.
- Inducted into the Hockey Hall of Fame in 2005.
- Won the Lester Patrick Trophy — 2010
- Stanley Cup champion — 2011 (As Boston Bruins President)
- Inducted into the Portland Winterhawks Hall of Fame (2023).
- His #21 jersey number was retired by the Portland Winterhawks on March 18, 2023.
- Named One of the Top 100 Best Bruins Players of all Time.
- Named to the Boston Bruins All-Centennial Team

== See also ==
- 50 goals in 50 games
- Hockey Hall of Fame
- Power forward (ice hockey)

Awards and achievements
Preceded by Michel Petit	Vancouver Canucks first-round draft pick 1983	Succeeded by J. J. Daigneault
Preceded by Mario Lemieux	Bill Masterton Trophy winner 1994	Succeeded by Pat LaFontaine

Sporting positions
Preceded by Harry Sinden	President of the Boston Bruins; 2006 – Present	Succeeded by Incumbent
