= Gordie Walker =

Canadian ice hockey player (born 1965)

- Born: August 12, 1965 (age 60) Castlegar, British Columbia, Canada
- Height: 6 ft 0 in (183 cm)
- Weight: 175 lb (79 kg; 12 st 7 lb)
- Position: Right wing
- Shot: Left
- Played for: New York Rangers; Los Angeles Kings
- National team: Canada
- NHL draft: 53rd overall, 1983; New York Rangers
- Playing career: 1985–1991

Gord Walker (born August 12, 1965) is a Canadian former professional ice hockey player. He played 31 games in the National Hockey League with the New York Rangers and Los Angeles Kings between 1987 and 1989. The rest of his career, which lasted from 1985 to 1991, was spent in the minor leagues. He was selected by the New York Rangers in the third round (53rd overall) of the 1983 NHL entry draft.

== Minor hockey career ==
Walker spent the majority of his playing career in the minor leagues and was a member of the 1983 Memorial Cup champion Portland Winter Hawks.

== Family ==
Gord's son Luke, also played hockey, and was a member of the American national junior team that won gold at the 2010 World Junior Championships. Luke was drafted by Colorado in the fifth round of the 2010 NHL entry draft, but did not play in the NHL.

== Career statistics ==
=== Regular season and playoffs ===
			Regular season					Playoffs
Season	Team	League	GP	G	A	Pts	PIM	GP	G	A	Pts	PIM
1980–81	Castlegar Rebels	KIJHL	—	—	—	—	—	—	—	—	—	—
1981–82	Drumheller Miners	AJHL	60	35	44	79	98	—	—	—	—	—
1982–83	Portland Winter Hawks	WHL	66	24	30	54	95	14	5	8	13	12
1982–83	Portland Winter Hawks	M-Cup	—	—	—	—	—	4	0	2	2	2
1983–84	Portland Winter Hawks	WHL	58	28	41	69	65	14	8	11	19	18
1984–85	Kamloops Blazers	WHL	66	67	67	134	76	15	13	14	27	34
1985–86	New Haven Nighthawks	AHL	46	11	28	39	66	—	—	—	—	—
1986–87	New York Rangers	NHL	1	1	0	1	4	—	—	—	—	—
1986–87	New Haven Nighthawks	AHL	59	24	20	44	58	7	3	2	5	0
1987–88	New York Rangers	NHL	18	1	4	5	17	—	—	—	—	—
1987–88	New Haven Nighthawks	AHL	14	10	9	19	17	—	—	—	—	—
1987–88	Colorado Rangers	IHL	16	4	9	13	4	—	—	—	—	—
1988–89	Los Angeles Kings	NHL	11	1	0	1	2	—	—	—	—	—
1988–89	New Haven Nighthawks	AHL	60	21	25	46	50	17	7	8	15	23
1989–90	Los Angeles Kings	NHL	1	0	0	0	0	—	—	—	—	—
1989–90	New Haven Nighthawks	AHL	24	14	7	21	8	—	—	—	—	—
1990–91	San Diego Gulls	IHL	22	3	7	10	24	—	—	—	—	—
1990–91	Canadian National Team	Intl	13	1	3	4	8	—	—	—	—	—
AHL totals			203	80	89	169	199	24	10	10	20	23
NHL totals			31	3	4	7	23	—	—	—	—	—

== Awards ==
- WHL West First All-Star Team – 1985
