= Luke Walker (ice hockey) =

American ice hockey player

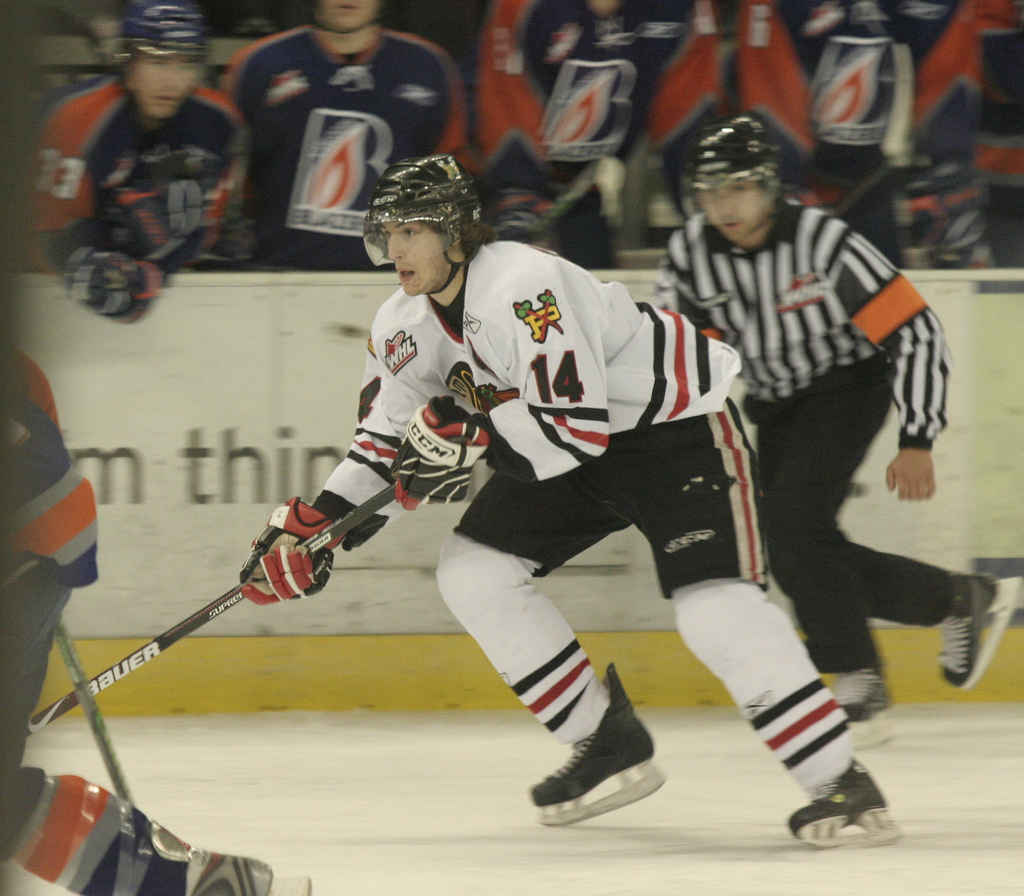
- Walker with the Portland Winterhawks in 2009
- Born: February 19, 1990 (age 36) New Haven, Connecticut, U.S.
- Height: 6 ft 2 in (188 cm)
- Weight: 195 lb (88 kg; 13 st 13 lb)
- Position: Right wing
- Shot: Right
- Played for: Lake Erie Monsters; KHL Medveščak Zagreb; Graz 99ers EC KAC
- NHL draft: 139th overall, 2010; Colorado Avalanche
- Playing career: 2010–2018

Luke Walker (born February 19, 1990) is an American former professional ice hockey forward, who played in the American Hockey League (AHL) with the Lake Erie Monsters.

== Playing career ==
=== Junior ===
Walker is the son of former New York Rangers and Los Angeles Kings forward Gordie Walker, and was born in New Haven, Connecticut, when his father was a member of the New Haven Nighthawks of the American Hockey League.

A native of Castlegar, British Columbia, Canada, Walker attended provincial B.C team, Okanagan Hockey Academy, scoring 50 goals in 52 games before joining the Portland Winterhawks of the Western Hockey League as a training camp invitee for the 2007–08 season.

In his three years with the Winterhawks, Luke scored 130 points in 202 games, improving his points totals in each year. In his final season with Portland in 2009–10, Walker scored a career high 57 points in 61 games, despite missing time due after surgically implanting a plate in his chin after he was hit in the face by a puck on December 8, 2009. He returned to help Portland progress to the second round of the postseason by scoring 10 points in 13 games.

After passing through the draft the two previous years, on June 26, 2010, Luke was chosen by the Colorado Avalanche in the fifth round, 109th overall, of the 2010 NHL entry draft.

=== Professional ===
Walker attended his first Avalanche NHL training camp for the 2010–11 season and after impressing through camp, with eligibility to play in the AHL with affiliate the Lake Erie Monsters, he was signed by Colorado to a three-year entry-level contract on September 28, 2010. Walker remained a constant with the Monsters throughout his entry-level contract with the Avalanche. In his final season with the Monsters, Walker's season was affected by concussion reducing him to 47 games, however still increasing his scoring rate.

On June 24, 2013, with his rights still owned by the Avalanche, Walker signed his first European contract, agreeing to a one-year deal with newly promoted Kontinental Hockey League club, KHL Medveščak Zagreb. On the lower lines of Zagreb and in a checking role, Walker endured a trying season in contributing with just 1 goal in 36 games for the 2013–14 season.

Walker expectedly left Zagreb at season's end and on July 31, 2014, agreed to a one-year contract with Austrian club, Graz 99ers of the EBEL. In the 2014–15 season, Walker quickly adapted to the Austrian league and reached a professional high 19 goals and 31 points in 55 games. After originally re-signing for another season with Graz and after competing in pre-season, Walker and Graz mutually opted to terminate his contract on September 9, 2015. Three days later on September 12, Walker remained in Austria to sign a one-year contract with fellow EBEL club, EC KAC.

== International play ==
Medal record

Representing United States

Men's ice hockey

World Junior Championship
Gold medal – first place	2010 Saskatchewan	

On January 5, 2010, Walker won a Gold Medal as a member of the United States men's national junior ice hockey team that won the 2010 World Junior Ice Hockey Championships. In the gold medal game, Team USA defeated the pre-tournament favorites and host country Canada 6–5 in overtime to win their second gold medal, thus ending Canada's bid for a record-breaking sixth consecutive gold medal.

== Career statistics ==
=== Regular season and playoffs ===
			Regular season					Playoffs
Season	Team	League	GP	G	A	Pts	PIM	GP	G	A	Pts	PIM
2007–08	Portland Winterhawks	WHL	70	9	12	21	84	—	—	—	—	—
2008–09	Portland Winterhawks	WHL	71	29	23	52	84	—	—	—	—	—
2009–10	Portland Winterhawks	WHL	61	27	30	57	103	13	6	4	10	17
2010–11	Lake Erie Monsters	AHL	75	10	8	18	40	5	1	1	2	0
2011–12	Lake Erie Monsters	AHL	61	9	18	27	26	—	—	—	—	—
2012–13	Lake Erie Monsters	AHL	47	12	13	25	51	—	—	—	—	—
2013–14	KHL Medveščak Zagreb	KHL	36	1	2	3	20	1	0	0	0	0
2014–15	Graz 99ers	EBEL	51	19	12	31	28	—	—	—	—	—
2015–16	EC KAC	EBEL	36	3	8	11	17	3	1	0	1	0
2016–17	Terrace River Kings	CIHL	14	12	12	24	17	5	3	4	7	0
2017–18	Terrace River Kings	CIHL	9	11	5	16	17	4	1	4	5	0
AHL totals			183	31	39	70	117	5	1	1	2	0

=== International ===
Year	Team	Event	Result	GP	G	A	Pts	PIM
2010	United States	WJC	1st place, gold medalist(s)	7	0	0	0	6
Junior totals				7	0	0	0	6
