= Mike Vernon (ice hockey) =

Canadian professional ice hockey goaltender (born 1963)

- Hockey Hall of Fame, 2023
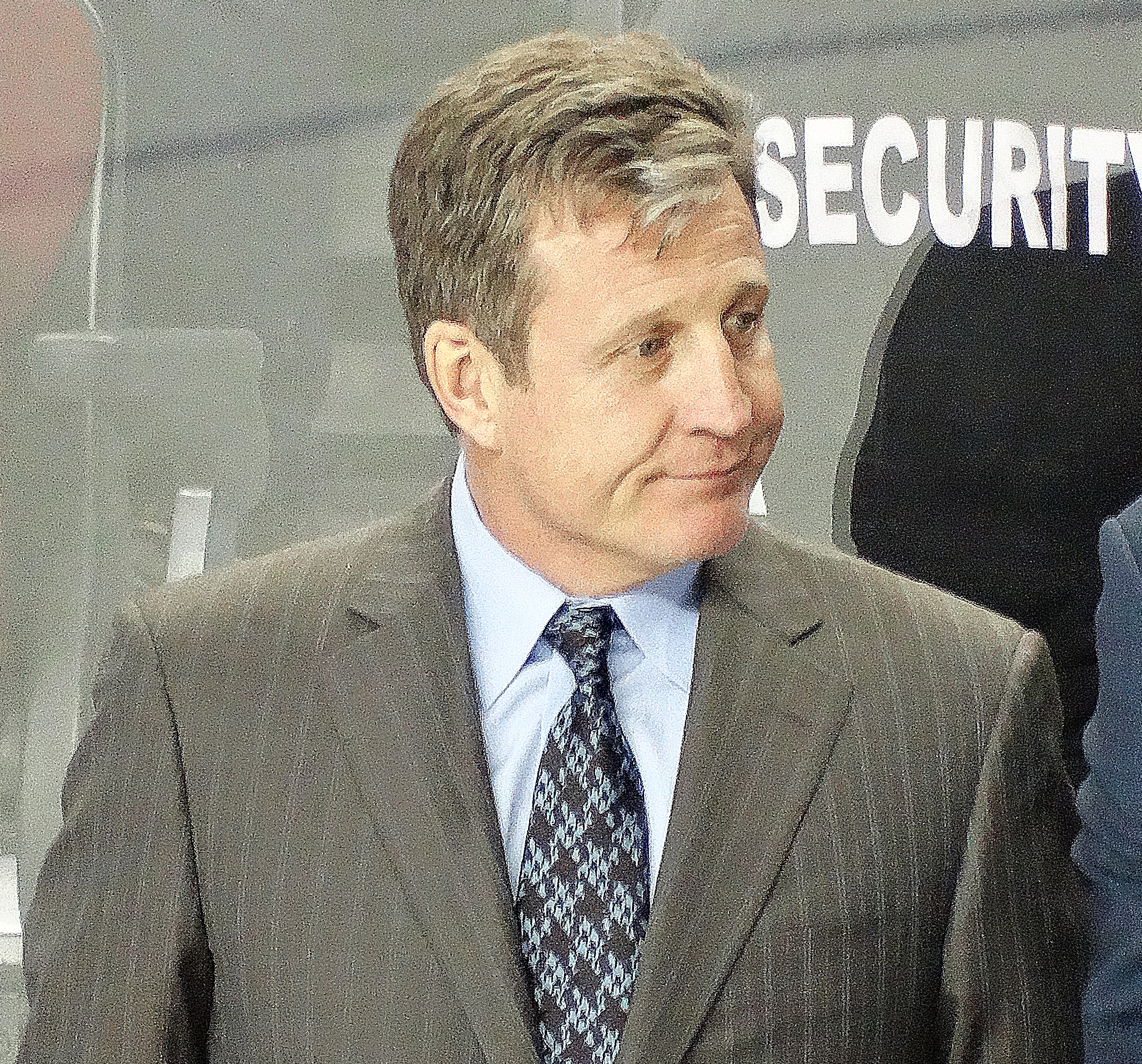
- Vernon in 2014
- Born: February 24, 1963 (age 63) Calgary, Alberta, Canada
- Height: 5 ft 9 in (175 cm)
- Weight: 167 lb (76 kg; 11 st 13 lb)
- Position: Goaltender
- Caught: Left
- Played for: Calgary Flames; Detroit Red Wings; San Jose Sharks; Florida Panthers
- National team: Canada
- NHL draft: 56th overall, 1981; Calgary Flames
- Playing career: 1982–2002
Medal record
Men's ice hockey
Representing Canada
World Junior Championships
| Bronze medal – third place | 1983 Soviet Union | Ice hockey |
World Championships
| Silver medal – second place | 1991 Finland | Ice hockey |

Michael Vernon (born February 24, 1963) is a Canadian former professional ice hockey player. As a goaltender, he played 19 seasons in the National Hockey League (NHL) for the Calgary Flames, Detroit Red Wings, San Jose Sharks and Florida Panthers.

A winner of over 300 NHL games, he is a two-time Stanley Cup champion, with the Flames in 1989 and the Red Wings in 1997. He appeared in five NHL All-Star Games, was named a second team All-Star in 1989, shared the William M. Jennings Trophy in 1996 with Chris Osgood, and was named the winner of the Conn Smythe Trophy as most valuable player of the 1997 Stanley Cup Playoffs.

Vernon was a standout goaltender in junior for the Calgary Wranglers of the Western Hockey League (WHL). He was named both goaltender of the year and most valuable player in 1982 and 1983. He was loaned to the Portland Winterhawks for the 1983 Memorial Cup and was named the top goaltender of the tournament in leading Portland to the championship.

Selected by the Flames in the third round, 56th overall, in the 1981 NHL entry draft, Vernon began his professional career in 1982 and ended it 20 years later, also in Calgary. The Flames retired his number 30 in 2007, he was inducted into the Alberta Sports Hall of Fame in 2010 and he was inducted into the Hockey Hall of Fame in 2023. Vernon represented Canada internationally on two occasions, winning a bronze medal at the 1983 World Junior Championship and silver at the 1991 World Championship.

== Playing career ==
=== Junior ===
Vernon began playing hockey at South Calgary Community Association outdoor rinks as a goaltender at the age of six. A native of Calgary, Vernon played his junior hockey in his hometown. First for the Calgary Canucks of the Alberta Junior Hockey League in 1979–80, and then the Calgary Wranglers of the Western Hockey League (WHL). He appeared in 59 games in his first WHL season, 1980–81, posting a 33–17–1 record before leading the team to the WHL finals where the Wranglers lost the best-of-seven championship to the Victoria Cougars, four games to three. Vernon attracted the attention of the Calgary Flames, who selected him with their third-round pick, 56th overall, at the 1981 NHL entry draft, on June 10, 1981.

Vernon returned to the Wranglers for the 1981–82 season where he posted a 22–14–3 record with three shutouts. He was named a WHL all-star at goal, and was the recipient of the WHL Top Goaltender Award and named WHL most valuable player. Though the Wranglers were eliminated in the playoffs, junior rules of the time allowed the league champion to add an extra goaltender on loan for the Memorial Cup tournament. Vernon accepted an invitation to join the Portland Winter Hawks for the 1983 tournament where the team finished third in the three-team event (all teams had two wins and two losses). Vernon made his professional debut following the tournament, appearing in one playoff game for the Central Hockey League's Oklahoma City Stars.

Vernon spent a third season with the Wranglers in 1982–83, however injuries during the season to Reggie Lemelin and Don Edwards forced the Flames to recall him to the NHL. Vernon made his NHL debut on December 12, 1982, against the Detroit Red Wings. A poor effort by the Flames resulted in Vernon surrendering six goals in the first two periods before being pulled in a 7–3 loss. Vernon appeared in one additional game, also a loss, before returning to the WHL where he repeated as the WHL's top goaltender and most valuable player. Vernon also played with the Canadian team at the 1982 World Junior Championship, winning two games in three appearances and helping Canada win the bronze medal.

Vernon again joined the Winter Hawks, for the 1983 Memorial Cup, but not without controversy. The WHL champion Lethbridge Broncos first requested he join their team for the tournament, but he was unwilling to play under the team's coach and refused. The Broncos were upset by Vernon's refusal, calling it "garbage" that he was allowed to join the rival Winter Hawks, who were hosting the tournament, after turning them down. Winning all three games he started, Vernon led Portland to the championship. He was named recipient of the Hap Emms Memorial Trophy as the most valuable goaltender of the tournament while the Winter Hawks became the first American team to win the Memorial Cup.

=== Calgary Flames ===
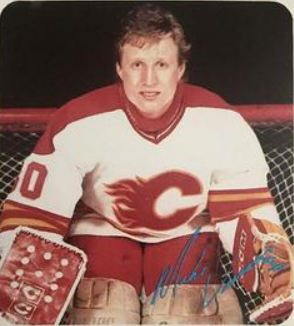
Vernon with the Calgary Flames in 1986

Turning professional in 1982–83, Vernon spent most of the season with the CHL's Colorado Flames where he was named to the league's second all-star team after posting a 30–13–2 record in 46 games. He returned to the Flames in 1983-84 but had a loss so he returned to the CHL. Considered at that point to be Calgary's goaltender of the future, he moved up to the Moncton Golden Flames of the American Hockey League (AHL) for 1984–85. The season was a disappointment for Vernon as he struggled throughout the year. He won only 10 of 41 starts and posted a goals against average (GAA) of 3.94. Vernon began the 1985–86 season as the fourth goaltender on the Flames' depth chart behind Lemelin, Marc D'Amour and Rick Kosti. He split the first half of the season between Moncton in the AHL and the Salt Lake Golden Eagles of the International Hockey League (IHL).

In the midst of what was ultimately a franchise record losing streak, wishing to rest Lemelin and facing a minor injury to backup Marc D'Amour, the Flames brought Vernon up to play an exhibition game against Soviet club Dynamo Moscow during the 1986 Super Series. Vernon was outstanding in goal, leading the Flames to a 4–3 victory. Following a 9–1 loss to the Hartford Whalers that was Calgary's 11th consecutive defeat, Vernon was given his first regular season start on January 9, 1986, against the Vancouver Canucks. He led the team to a 5–4 overtime victory to end the streak. It was also Vernon's first NHL win. He recorded his first career shutout, also against Vancouver, on February 26 in a 4–0 win during a stretch where Vernon went two months without losing a game in which he started.

Three of Vernon's nine regular season wins came against the Winnipeg Jets, Calgary's first round opponent in the 1986 Stanley Cup playoffs. Though he had only 21-games of NHL experience, Vernon was named the starter for the series. He led the Flames to a three-game sweep of Winnipeg, followed by seven-game series victories over the Oilers and St. Louis Blues to lead the Flames into the Stanley Cup Final where the Flames ultimately fell to the Montreal Canadiens and their rookie goaltender Patrick Roy in five games.

Vernon solidified his position as the Flames' starting goaltender in 1986–87, finishing third in the NHL with 30 wins. His 39 wins the following season was second in the league, one behind Grant Fuhr. He played in the 1988 All-Star Game, his first of four consecutive appearances in the event, and helped the Flames win the Presidents' Trophy as the NHL's top team in the regular season. The Flames were upset by the Oilers in the playoffs, however.

"There's no question I feel really happy winning it. (But) if you look down our lineup, there are so many guys that could have won. When you look back at the Vancouver series, Mike Vernon stood on his head for us in overtime. If it weren't for him, we wouldn't be here today."

— Al MacInnis, after being named Conn Smythe Trophy winner as the most valuable player of the 1989 playoffs.

The 1988–89 season was one of Vernon's finest. He led all NHL goaltenders in wins with 37 and was second with a 2.65 GAA. He was named to the second All-Star team and helped Calgary post the best record in the League. He finished second to Roy in voting for the Vezina Trophy as the league's top goaltender. The Flames entered the 1989 playoffs as heavy favourites to defeat Vancouver in the opening round, but the Canucks forced Calgary to a seventh and deciding game in the series. The game went to overtime, during which Vernon was forced to make a spectacular glove save on a Stan Smyl breakaway. That save came to be a defining moment of Vernon's career, and was later called "the save that won the Cup". The Flames defeated Vancouver when Joel Otto scored the winner, then went on to defeat the Los Angeles Kings, Chicago Blackhawks and Montreal Canadiens to win Calgary's first Stanley Cup championship.

Vernon remained among the NHL leaders in wins the following seasons, finishing sixth in 1989–90 with 23 and second in 1990–91 with 31. He was voted to the starting lineup for both the 1990 and 1991 All-Star Games via fan balloting. He served as the backup goaltender for Team Canada at the 1991 World Championship, and though he lost both games he appeared in, Vernon and the Canadians won the silver medal. Despite his success with the Flames, Vernon was often criticized for letting in weak goals, and was routinely booed by the fans in Calgary when he did so. Some fans chose to direct insults towards his family in the stands, causing his parents to stop attending games. Discussing his relationship with Flames fans later in his career, Vernon said, "You've got to have a pretty thick skin to play goal. Fans at hockey games get very emotional. They're very passionate. They don't enjoy watching their team give up goals."

Vernon also battled through recurring back problems that occasionally forced him out of the lineup. Playing through it all, Vernon became the 38th goaltender in league history to win 200 games, reaching the milestone on November 14, 1992, against the Tampa Bay Lightning. He played in his fifth All-Star Game in 1992–93, and was named to play his sixth the following season but had to withdraw due to a knee injury. After nearly ten seasons with Vernon as Calgary's starting goaltender, the Flames felt it was time to hand the starting goaltender duties to Trevor Kidd. On June 29, 1994, they traded Vernon to the Detroit Red Wings in exchange for defenceman Steve Chiasson. The Red Wings had been pursuing a deal for Vernon since the previous season.

=== Detroit Red Wings ===
Detroit anticipated the veteran Vernon would help develop their young goaltender Chris Osgood. As Detroit's top goaltender in 1994–95, Vernon posted a 19–6–4 record and helped the Red Wings win the Presidents' Trophy. The Red Wings reached the 1995 Stanley Cup Final – their first appearance in the championship series since 1966 – but were swept in four games by the New Jersey Devils. Vernon and the Red Wings struggled to agree on a new contract following the season. Their dispute went to arbitration after Vernon and his agent accepted an offer of a two-year, US$5.45 million contract that the team claimed to have withdrawn. The arbitrator sided with the Red Wings, making Vernon an unrestricted free agent. The two sides ultimately agreed on a two-year contract, of which the financial terms were not released.

While Osgood began to establish his position as the Red Wings' starter in 1995–96, Vernon won 21 games against only 7 regulation losses as the Red Wings set an NHL record with 62 victories in the regular season. They shared the William M. Jennings Trophy as the goaltending duo on the team with the fewest goals against. Both goalies shared goaltending duties during the 1996–97 season, and he became the 13th player in NHL history to win 300 games. He reached the milestone on March 26, 1997, against the Colorado Avalanche in a game in which he also fought Colorado goaltender Patrick Roy.

Head coach Scotty Bowman turned to the veteran Vernon as the team's starter in the 1997 playoffs after Osgood struggled late in the regular season. He recorded a 16–4 record with a 1.76 GAA in the post-season, and was named the Conn Smythe Trophy winner as the most valuable player of the playoffs as Detroit won its first Stanley Cup championship in 42 years. Placed in a position where the Red Wings had to trade a goaltender due to the waiver draft, Detroit chose to trade Vernon to the San Jose Sharks in exchange for two draft picks on August 18, 1997.

=== San Jose Sharks ===
With the Sharks, Vernon formed a tandem with veteran Kelly Hrudey and delivered a solid performance for the team. Vernon played two full seasons with the Sharks, winning 30 games in 1997–98 and leading the team to the playoffs in both 1998 and 1999. However, in his second season, Vernon became expendable thanks to the play of Steve Shields and the need to make a spot for rookie Evgeni Nabokov. On December 30, 1999, Vernon was traded to the Florida Panthers (along with a draft pick) in exchange for Radek Dvořák. Vernon, who was quite content with the Sharks, was caught off guard by the trade: “(Head Coach Darryl Sutter) told me to get ready to play the second half of the season. I was well rested and ready to play,” Vernon said. “I was completely thrown for a loop because I felt like we finally had all the pieces to challenge for the Stanley Cup. I was very disappointed.”

=== Florida Panthers ===
The opening for Vernon in South Florida was created when goaltender Trevor Kidd dislocated his shoulder a couple of weeks before the trade. Vernon appeared in 34 games with the Panthers, winning 18, and led them to the playoffs for the first time in three seasons. Despite his success, when it came time for the Panthers to protect a goaltender in the 2000 NHL Expansion Draft Panthers general manager Bryan Murray went with Trevor Kidd, who was ten years younger than Vernon. Much like he had in Calgary years before, Trevor Kidd pushed Vernon out of the picture. Vernon was claimed by the Minnesota Wild but was immediately traded to the Calgary Flames in exchange for Dan Cavanaugh and an eighth round selection in the 2000 NHL entry draft. Vernon, who left Calgary on acrimonious terms six years before, was shocked to hear he was returning to the Flames. "Oh my God, you're joking," Vernon said. "I'm going where? You have got to be kidding me."

=== Return to Calgary ===
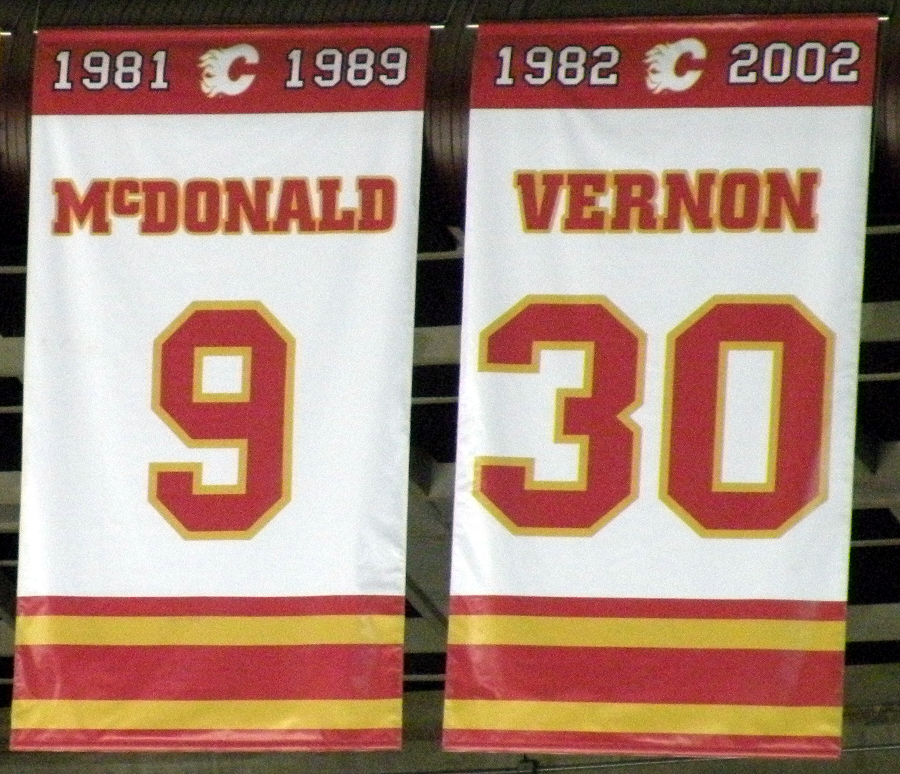
Vernon's retired number banner hangs alongside Lanny McDonald's in the Scotiabank Saddledome's rafters.

Returning to the franchise he began his career with, the 37-year-old Vernon was expected to split goaltending duties with Fred Brathwaite. He played in 41 games in 2000–01, winning 12 games, losing 23 and posting a 3.23 GAA. He appeared in 18 games in 2001–02, and though his GAA improved to 2.76, he won only two. Vernon left the game following the season, announcing his retirement on September 13, 2002. He retired seventh all-time in regular season wins with 385, fourth among goalies in playoff appearances at 138 and fifth in playoff wins with 77. He played in four Stanley Cup Final, winning two Stanley Cups.

Vernon held virtually every Flames franchise goaltending record upon his retirement. His regular season records—games played (526), wins (262) and minutes played (29,650)—were all subsequently broken by Miikka Kiprusoff, but he remains the team leader in playoff games played (81) and wins (43). The Flames honoured Vernon on February 6, 2007, retiring his #30 jersey. He was the second player in franchise history to have his number retired, after Lanny McDonald. Vernon was inducted into the Alberta Sports Hall of Fame in 2010. Vernon returned to the ice 2011 to play in the alumni game at the Heritage Classic outdoor game.

Hockey Hall of Fame goaltender Glenn Hall considered Vernon one of the best goaltenders of his era: "I always thought Grant Fuhr was the best goalie of his time. But I always thought Vernie was very close." Vernon said that playing against the likes of Fuhr and Patrick Roy led him to improve at his position. He was a stand-up goaltender early in his career, but learned to adopt aspects of the butterfly style after watching them play. Standing only 5 feet 9 inches (1.75 m) tall, he relied on speed and reflexes to be a successful goaltender in the NHL.

== Personal life ==
Vernon was born February 24, 1963, in Calgary. His father Martin worked in construction and was president of the South Calgary community hockey organization where young Mike played his youth hockey. Vernon attended Central Memorial High School and Henry Wise Wood Senior High School. He was always a goaltender, often joining his father for practices by age four and always focusing on the goaltenders. He considered his mother Lorraine his first coach and claimed his introduction to goaltending came from his family: "I had three brothers and when it came time to play hockey, they always said the same thing: 'Get Mikey, he'll play net.'"

Vernon and his wife Jane were married three days after his 1994 trade to Detroit. The couple have four children: daughter Amelia and three sons, Matthew, John and William. Matthew is currently a goalie with HC TWK Innsbruck of the ICE Hockey League in Austria. The couple live in Calgary, but maintain a home in Invermere, British Columbia. Following his hockey career, Vernon has become involved in real estate development in the Windermere region near Invermere. He was also an investor in the Bear Mountain resort near Victoria, British Columbia.

== Career statistics ==
=== Regular season and playoffs ===
| | | | Regular season | | | | | | | | | Playoffs |
| Season | Team | League | GP | W | L | T | MIN | GA | SO | GAA | SV% | GP | W | L | MIN | GA | SO | GAA | SV% |
|---|---|---|---|---|---|---|---|---|---|---|---|---|---|---|---|---|---|---|---|
| 1979–80 | Calgary Canucks | AJHL | 31 | 21 | 7 | 0 | 1796 | 88 | 0 | 2.95 | — | 7 | 3 | 4 | 399 | 22 | 0 | 3.30 | — |
| 1980–81 | Calgary Wranglers | WHL | 59 | 33 | 17 | 1 | 3154 | 198 | 1 | 3.77 | .880 | 22 | 14 | 8 | 1271 | 82 | 1 | 3.87 | — |
| 1981–82 | Calgary Wranglers | WHL | 42 | 22 | 14 | 2 | 2329 | 143 | 3 | 3.68 | .887 | 9 | 5 | 4 | 527 | 30 | 0 | 3.42 | — |
| 1981–82 | Portland Winter Hawks | MC | — | — | — | — | — | — | — | — | — | 3 | 1 | 2 | 171 | 16 | 0 | 5.61 | .868 |
| 1981–82 | Oklahoma City Stars | CHL | — | — | — | — | — | — | — | — | — | 1 | 0 | 1 | 70 | 4 | 0 | 3.43 | — |
| 1982–83 | Calgary Wranglers | WHL | 50 | 29 | 18 | 2 | 2856 | 155 | 3 | 3.26 | — | 16 | 9 | 7 | 925 | 60 | 0 | 3.89 | — |
| 1982–83 | Calgary Flames | NHL | 2 | 0 | 2 | 0 | 100 | 11 | 0 | 6.60 | .761 | — | — | — | — | — | — | — | — |
| 1982–83 | Portland Winter Hawks | MC | — | — | — | — | — | — | — | — | — | 3 | 3 | 0 | 180 | 14 | 0 | 4.67 | — |
| 1983–84 | Colorado Flames | CHL | 46 | 30 | 13 | 2 | 2648 | 148 | 1 | 3.35 | — | 6 | 2 | 4 | 347 | 21 | 0 | 3.63 | — |
| 1983–84 | Calgary Flames | NHL | 1 | 0 | 1 | 0 | 11 | 4 | 0 | 21.82 | .333 | — | — | — | — | — | — | — | — |
| 1984–85 | Moncton Golden Flames | AHL | 41 | 10 | 20 | 4 | 2050 | 134 | 0 | 3.92 | .874 | — | — | — | — | — | — | — | — |
| 1985–86 | Salt Lake Golden Eagles | IHL | 10 | 6 | 4 | 0 | 600 | 34 | 1 | 3.39 | — | — | — | — | — | — | — | — | — |
| 1985–86 | Moncton Golden Flames | AHL | 6 | 3 | 1 | 2 | 374 | 21 | 0 | 3.37 | .883 | — | — | — | — | — | — | — | — |
| 1985–86 | Calgary Flames | NHL | 18 | 9 | 3 | 3 | 921 | 52 | 1 | 3.39 | .875 | 21 | 12 | 9 | 1229 | 60 | 0 | 2.93 | .897 |
| 1986–87 | Calgary Flames | NHL | 54 | 30 | 21 | 1 | 2956 | 178 | 1 | 3.61 | .883 | 5 | 2 | 3 | 263 | 16 | 0 | 3.65 | .882 |
| 1987–88 | Calgary Flames | NHL | 64 | 39 | 16 | 7 | 3565 | 210 | 1 | 3.53 | .877 | 9 | 4 | 4 | 515 | 34 | 0 | 3.96 | .838 |
| 1988–89 | Calgary Flames | NHL | 52 | 37 | 6 | 5 | 2938 | 130 | 0 | 2.65 | .897 | 22 | 16 | 5 | 1381 | 52 | 3 | 2.26 | .905 |
| 1989–90 | Calgary Flames | NHL | 47 | 23 | 14 | 9 | 2795 | 146 | 0 | 3.13 | .870 | 6 | 2 | 3 | 342 | 19 | 0 | 3.33 | .873 |
| 1990–91 | Calgary Flames | NHL | 54 | 31 | 19 | 3 | 3121 | 172 | 1 | 3.31 | .878 | 7 | 3 | 4 | 427 | 21 | 0 | 2.95 | .897 |
| 1991–92 | Calgary Flames | NHL | 63 | 24 | 30 | 9 | 3684 | 217 | 0 | 3.58 | .883 | — | — | — | — | — | — | — | — |
| 1992–93 | Calgary Flames | NHL | 64 | 29 | 26 | 9 | 3732 | 203 | 2 | 3.26 | .887 | 4 | 1 | 1 | 150 | 15 | 0 | 6.00 | .815 |
| 1993–94 | Calgary Flames | NHL | 48 | 26 | 17 | 5 | 2798 | 131 | 3 | 2.81 | .892 | 7 | 3 | 4 | 466 | 23 | 0 | 2.96 | .895 |
| 1994–95 | Detroit Red Wings | NHL | 30 | 19 | 6 | 4 | 1807 | 76 | 1 | 2.52 | .893 | 18 | 12 | 6 | 1063 | 41 | 1 | 2.31 | .889 |
| 1995–96 | Detroit Red Wings | NHL | 32 | 21 | 7 | 2 | 1855 | 70 | 1 | 2.26 | .903 | 4 | 2 | 2 | 243 | 11 | 0 | 2.72 | .864 |
| 1996–97 | Detroit Red Wings | NHL | 33 | 13 | 11 | 8 | 1952 | 79 | 0 | 2.43 | .899 | 20 | 16 | 4 | 1229 | 36 | 1 | 1.76 | .927 |
| 1997–98 | San Jose Sharks | NHL | 62 | 30 | 22 | 8 | 3564 | 146 | 5 | 2.46 | .896 | 6 | 2 | 4 | 348 | 14 | 1 | 2.41 | .899 |
| 1998–99 | San Jose Sharks | NHL | 49 | 16 | 22 | 10 | 2831 | 107 | 4 | 2.27 | .911 | 5 | 2 | 3 | 321 | 13 | 0 | 2.43 | .924 |
| 1999–00 | San Jose Sharks | NHL | 15 | 6 | 5 | 1 | 772 | 32 | 0 | 2.49 | .911 | — | — | — | — | — | — | — | — |
| 1999–00 | Florida Panthers | NHL | 34 | 18 | 13 | 2 | 2019 | 83 | 1 | 2.47 | .919 | 4 | 0 | 4 | 237 | 12 | 0 | 3.04 | .912 |
| 2000–01 | Calgary Flames | NHL | 41 | 12 | 23 | 5 | 2246 | 121 | 3 | 3.23 | .883 | — | — | — | — | — | — | — | — |
| 2001–02 | Calgary Flames | NHL | 18 | 2 | 9 | 1 | 825 | 38 | 1 | 2.76 | .899 | — | — | — | — | — | — | — | — |
| NHL totals | | | 781 | 385 | 273 | 92 | 44,449 | 2,206 | 27 | 2.98 | .889 | 138 | 77 | 56 | 8,211 | 367 | 6 | 2.68 | .896 |

=== International ===
| Year | Team | Event | GP | W | L | T | MIN | GA | SO | GAA |
|---|---|---|---|---|---|---|---|---|---|---|
| 1983 | Canada | WJC | 4 | 2 | 0 | 0 | 180 | 10 | 1 | 3.33 |
| 1991 | Canada | WC | 2 | 0 | 2 | 0 | 74 | 6 | 0 | 4.91 |
| Senior totals | | | 2 | 0 | 2 | 0 | 74 | 6 | 0 | 4.91 |

== Awards and honours ==
| Award | Year |
Junior
| WHL Most Valuable Player | 1982, 1983 |
| WHL Top Goaltender Award | 1982, 1983 |
| WHL first All-Star team | 1982, 1983 |
| Hap Emms Memorial Trophy | 1983 |
CHL
| Second-team All-Star | 1984 |
NHL
| Second-team All-Star | 1989 |
| William M. Jennings Trophy | 1996 |
| Conn Smythe Trophy | 1997 |
| Stanley Cup champion | 1989, 1997 |
| Played in NHL All-Star Game | 1988, 1989, 1990, 1991, 1993 |
Calgary Flames
| Molson Cup | 1992 |

== See also ==
- Red Wings–Avalanche brawl

| Preceded by Joe Sakic | Winner of the Conn Smythe Trophy; 1997 | Succeeded by Steve Yzerman |
| Preceded by Ed Belfour | Winner of the Jennings Trophy; 1996 (with Chris Osgood) | Succeeded by Martin Brodeur, Mike Dunham |
