= Taylor Hall (ice hockey, born 1964) =

Canadian ice hockey player

- Born: February 20, 1964 (age 62) Regina, Saskatchewan, Canada
- Height: 5 ft 11 in (180 cm)
- Weight: 190 lb (86 kg; 13 st 8 lb)
- Position: Left wing
- Shot: Left
- Played for: Vancouver Canucks; Boston Bruins
- NHL draft: 116th overall, 1982; Vancouver Canucks
- Playing career: 1983–1996

Taylor Hall (born February 20, 1964) is a Canadian former professional ice hockey player who spent parts of five seasons in the National Hockey League with the Vancouver Canucks and Boston Bruins. Hall played 41 games across five seasons in the NHL, with the rest of his career coming in the minor leagues and in Europe. After retiring in 1996 he took up coaching and later became general manager for several clubs, with his longest tenure coming with the Tulsa Oilers of the Central Hockey League and later ECHL, from 2008 until 2019.

Hall is not related to the current player of the same name.

== Playing career ==
Hall played his junior hockey with the Regina Pats of the Western Hockey League, and was selected 116th overall in the 1982 NHL entry draft by the Vancouver Canucks. By the 1983–84 season he was dominating the WHL and finished the year with 63 goals and 142 points, good for fourth in the league. He also made his NHL debut, appearing in four games for the Canucks and scoring his first NHL goal.

Considered one of Vancouver's top young prospects, Hall cracked the Canucks' roster out of training camp for the 1984–85 campaign and got off to a great start with five points in his first seven games. However, in an October 23, 1984 game against the New York Islanders, Hall crashed heavily into a goalpost and blew out his left knee. The injury ended his season, and his career never really regained the momentum it had previously.

Hall returned for the 1985–86 season, but spent most of the year in the minors. When recalled to Vancouver, he performed well with 5 goals and 10 points in 19 games. However, by the 1986–87 season he had fallen down the team's depth chart, appearing in just four games, and he was released at the end of the season.

For the 1987–88 season, Hall signed with the Boston Bruins and turned in a strong 74-point effort for the Maine Mariners of the American Hockey League, earning him a 7-game callup to Boston. However, it would be his final taste of NHL hockey, as he would spend most of the next season in Italy. After bouncing between Europe and the International Hockey League for a few seasons, he signed with the Tulsa Oilers of the Central Hockey League, where he spent four solid seasons before retiring in 1996.

During his career, Hall appeared in 41 NHL games, recording 7 goals and 9 assists for 16 points along with 29 penalty minutes. Following his playing career Hall moved into coaching, and has coached several franchises in the CHL and WPHL. He is currently serving as the General Manager of his last professional club as a player, the Tulsa Oilers.

== Career statistics ==
=== Regular season and playoffs ===
| | | | Regular season | | | | | Playoffs |
| Season | Team | League | GP | G | A | Pts | PIM | GP | G | A | Pts | PIM |
|---|---|---|---|---|---|---|---|---|---|---|---|---|
| 1980–81 | Regina Pat Canadiens Midget AAA | SMHL | 63 | 93 | 71 | 164 | 94 | — | — | — | — | — |
| 1980–81 | Regina Blues | SJHL | 13 | 5 | 3 | 8 | 2 | — | — | — | — | — |
| 1981–82 | Regina Pats | WHL | 48 | 14 | 15 | 29 | 43 | 11 | 2 | 3 | 5 | 44 |
| 1982–83 | Regina Pats | WHL | 72 | 37 | 57 | 94 | 78 | 5 | 0 | 3 | 3 | 12 |
| 1983–84 | Regina Pats | WHL | 69 | 63 | 79 | 142 | 42 | 23 | 21 | 20 | 41 | 26 |
| 1983–84 | Vancouver Canucks | NHL | 4 | 1 | 0 | 1 | 0 | — | — | — | — | — |
| 1984–85 | Vancouver Canucks | NHL | 7 | 1 | 4 | 5 | 19 | — | — | — | — | — |
| 1985–86 | Vancouver Canucks | NHL | 19 | 5 | 5 | 10 | 6 | — | — | — | — | — |
| 1985–86 | Fredericton Express | AHL | 45 | 21 | 14 | 35 | 28 | 1 | 0 | 0 | 0 | 0 |
| 1986–87 | Vancouver Canucks | NHL | 4 | 0 | 0 | 0 | 0 | — | — | — | — | — |
| 1986–87 | Fredericton Express | AHL | 36 | 21 | 20 | 41 | 23 | — | — | — | — | — |
| 1987–88 | Boston Bruins | NHL | 7 | 0 | 0 | 0 | 4 | — | — | — | — | — |
| 1987–88 | Maine Mariners | AHL | 71 | 33 | 41 | 74 | 58 | 10 | 1 | 4 | 5 | 21 |
| 1988–89 | Maine Mariners | AHL | 8 | 0 | 1 | 1 | 7 | — | — | — | — | — |
| 1988–89 | Newmarket Saints | AHL | 9 | 5 | 5 | 10 | 14 | — | — | — | — | — |
| 1988–89 | Asiago | ITA | 26 | 25 | 21 | 46 | 60 | — | — | — | — | — |
| 1989–90 | New Haven Nighthawks | AHL | 51 | 14 | 23 | 37 | 10 | — | — | — | — | — |
| 1989–90 | Canadian National Team | Intl | 4 | 4 | 2 | 6 | 0 | — | — | — | — | — |
| 1990–91 | San Diego Gulls | IHL | 44 | 13 | 16 | 29 | 28 | — | — | — | — | — |
| 1991–92 | Furuset | NOR | 29 | 13 | 16 | 29 | 22 | — | — | — | — | — |
| 1992–93 | Tulsa Oilers | CHL | 58 | 35 | 45 | 80 | 64 | 9 | 3 | 5 | 8 | 16 |
| 1993–94 | Tulsa Oilers | CHL | 64 | 33 | 26 | 59 | 95 | 11 | 3 | 5 | 8 | 14 |
| 1994–95 | Tulsa Oilers | CHL | 58 | 29 | 39 | 68 | 33 | 7 | 2 | 3 | 5 | 17 |
| 1995–96 | Tulsa Oilers | CHL | 63 | 27 | 35 | 62 | 52 | 6 | 1 | 1 | 2 | 14 |
| NHL totals | | | 41 | 7 | 9 | 16 | 29 | — | — | — | — | — |

== Awards ==
- WHL East First All-Star Team – 1984
