= Grant Sasser =

American ice hockey player (born 1964)

- Born: February 13, 1964 (age 62) Portland, Oregon, U.S.
- Height: 5 ft 10 in (178 cm)
- Weight: 180 lb (82 kg; 12 st 12 lb)
- Position: Center
- Shot: Right
- Played for: Pittsburgh Penguins
- NHL draft: 94th overall, 1982; Pittsburgh Penguins
- Playing career: 1984–1985

Grant Sasser (born February 13, 1964) is an American former professional ice hockey player. He played three games in the National Hockey League with the Pittsburgh Penguins during the 1983–84 season. Sasser was the first Oregon native to participate in an NHL game. Sasser played junior hockey for the hometown Portland Winterhawks.

== Career statistics ==
=== Regular season and playoffs ===
			Regular season					Playoffs
Season	Team	League	GP	G	A	Pts	PIM	GP	G	A	Pts	PIM
1980–81	Fort Saskatchewan Traders	AJHL	54	33	49	82	49	—	—	—	—	—
1981–82	Portland Winterhawks	WHL	49	19	23	42	32	15	5	6	11	13
1981–82	Portland Winterhawks	M-Cup	—	—	—	—	—	4	0	1	1	0
1982–83	Portland Winterhawks	WHL	70	54	65	119	39	14	12	15	27	4
1982–83	Portland Winterhawks	M-Cup	—	—	—	—	—	4	3	4	7	0
1983–84	Pittsburgh Penguins	NHL	3	0	0	0	0	—	—	—	—	—
1983–84	Portland Winterhawks	WHL	66	44	69	113	24	14	5	8	13	2
1984–85	Baltimore Skipjacks	AHL	60	5	7	12	12	—	—	—	—	—
1984–85	Muskegon Lumberjacks	IHL	10	1	4	5	18	—	—	—	—	—
NHL totals			3	0	0	0	0	—	—	—	—	—

== Awards ==
- WHL West Second All-Star Team – 1984
