= Gary Yaremchuk =

Canadian ice hockey player

- Born: August 15, 1961 (age 63); Edmonton, Alberta, Canada
- Height: 6 ft 0 in (183 cm)
- Weight: 185 lb (84 kg; 13 st 3 lb)
- Position: Centre
- Shot: Left
- Played for: Toronto Maple Leafs; Jokerit; Kärpät; KooKoo; EV Zug; Amiens; HC Gherdëina; Durham Wasps
- NHL draft: 24th overall, 1981; Toronto Maple Leafs
- Playing career: 1981–1994

Gary Yaremchuk (born August 15, 1961) is a Canadian former professional ice hockey player. He played 34 games in the National Hockey League (NHL) with the Toronto Maple Leafs between 1981 and 1985, though mostly played in the American Hockey League at that time. He moved to Europe in 1986 and played in different countries there until he retired in 1994. His brother, Ken Yaremchuk, also played in the NHL.

== Career statistics ==
=== Regular season and playoffs ===
			Regular season					Playoffs
Season	Team	League	GP	G	A	Pts	PIM	GP	G	A	Pts	PIM
1978–79	Fort Saskatchewan Traders	AJHL	13	5	16	21	9	—	—	—	—	—
1979–80	Fort Saskatchewan Traders	AJHL	27	27	44	71	61	—	—	—	—	—
1979–80	Portland Winter Hawks	WHL	41	21	34	55	23	6	1	4	5	2
1980–81	Portland Winter Hawks	WHL	72	56	79	135	121	9	5	6	11	0
1981–82	Toronto Maple Leafs	NHL	18	0	3	3	10	—	—	—	—	—
1981–82	Cincinnati Tigers	CHL	53	21	35	56	101	4	0	2	2	4
1982–83	Toronto Maple Leafs	NHL	3	0	0	0	2	—	—	—	—	—
1982–83	St. Catharines Saints	AHL	61	17	28	45	72	—	—	—	—	—
1983–84	Toronto Maple Leafs	NHL	1	0	0	0	0	—	—	—	—	—
1983–84	St. Catharines Saints	AHL	73	24	37	61	84	7	5	1	6	2
1984–85	Toronto Maple Leafs	NHL	12	1	1	1	16	—	—	—	—	—
1984–85	St. Catharines Saints	AHL	66	17	47	64	75	—	—	—	—	—
1985–86	Adirondack Red Wings	AHL	60	12	32	44	90	1	1	0	1	0
1986–87	Jokerit	FIN	20	7	21	28	116	—	—	—	—	—
1987–88	Kärpät	FIN	36	16	27	43	92	—	—	—	—	—
1988–89	KooKoo	FIN	44	12	27	39	50	—	—	—	—	—
1988–89	EHC Uzwil	NLB	—	—	—	—	—	—	—	—	—	—
1989–90	KooKoo	FIN	42	16	19	35	81	—	—	—	—	—
1990–91	EC Ratingen	GER-2	2	1	8	9	8	—	—	—	—	—
1990–91	EV Zug	NLA	6	2	3	5	8	1	1	0	1	0
1991–92	Amiens	FRA	30	25	39	64	82	—	—	—	—	—
1992–93	HC Gherdëina	ITA	16	9	19	28	8	2	0	2	2	6
1992–93	HC Gherdëina	ALP	21	9	21	30	69	—	—	—	—	—
1993–94	Durham Wasps	BHL	40	53	93	143	57	—	—	—	—	—
AHL totals			260	70	144	214	321	8	6	1	7	2
NHL totals			34	1	4	5	28	—	—	—	—	—
