= Jeff Rohlicek =

American ice hockey player (born 1966)

- Born: January 27, 1966 (age 60) Park Ridge, Illinois, U.S.
- Height: 6 ft 1 in (185 cm)
- Weight: 190 lb (86 kg; 13 st 8 lb)
- Position: Center
- Shot: Left
- Played for: Vancouver Canucks
- NHL draft: 31st overall, 1984; Vancouver Canucks
- Playing career: 1986–1998

Jeffrey Rohlicek (born January 27, 1966) is an American former professional ice hockey center who played nine games in the National Hockey League for the Vancouver Canucks.

== Biography ==
Rohlicek was born in Park Ridge, Illinois. As a youth, he played in the 1979 Quebec International Pee-Wee Hockey Tournament with the Chicago Hawks minor ice hockey team.

In the 1985 World Juniors in Finland, Rohlicek had 2 assists, helping the US to a 6th-place finish, as Canada won its 2nd Gold Medal.

He scored the Cup-winning goal for the Springfield Indians in overtime in the deciding game of the 1990 Calder Cup championship finals.

He currently lives in Canada.

== Career statistics ==
=== Regular season and playoffs ===
			Regular season					Playoffs
Season	Team	League	GP	G	A	Pts	PIM	GP	G	A	Pts	PIM
1981–82	Chicago Jets	MNHL	35	57	73	130	—	—	—	—	—	—
1982–83	Maine West High School	HS-IL	25	60	60	120	—	—	—	—	—	—
1982–83	Chicago Jets	CJHL	36	54	71	125	—	—	—	—	—	—
1983–84	Portland Winterhawks	WHL	71	44	53	97	22	14	13	8	21	10
1984–85	Portland Winterhawks	WHL	16	5	13	18	2	—	—	—	—	—
1984–85	Kelowna Wings	WHL	49	34	39	73	24	6	3	6	9	2
1985–86	Spokane Chiefs	WHL	57	50	52	102	39	9	6	2	8	16
1986–87	Fredericton Express	AHL	70	19	37	56	22	—	—	—	—	—
1987–88	Fredericton Express	AHL	65	26	31	57	50	9	1	4	5	4
1987–88	Vancouver Canucks	NHL	7	0	0	0	4	—	—	—	—	—
1988–89	Milwaukee Admirals	IHL	78	47	63	110	106	11	6	6	12	8
1988–89	Vancouver Canucks	NHL	2	0	0	0	4	—	—	—	—	—
1989–90	Milwaukee Admirals	IHL	53	22	26	48	37	—	—	—	—	—
1989–90	Springfield Indians	AHL	12	1	2	3	4	7	3	2	5	6
1990–91	Phoenix Roadrunners	IHL	74	29	31	60	67	10	7	6	13	12
1990–91	New Haven Nighthawks	AHL	4	1	1	2	6	—	—	—	—	—
1991–92	Phoenix Roadrunners	IHL	23	5	11	16	32	—	—	—	—	—
1991–92	Indianapolis Ice	IHL	59	25	32	57	28	—	—	—	—	—
1992–93	Toledo Storm	ECHL	8	5	8	13	14	—	—	—	—	—
1992–93	Milwaukee Admirals	IHL	11	1	1	2	8	—	—	—	—	—
1992–93	Adirondack Red Wings	AHL	29	6	16	22	20	11	4	5	9	10
1993–94	Nashville Knights	ECHL	4	1	1	2	24	2	1	0	1	2
1993–94	Toledo Storm	ECHL	57	28	54	82	36	—	—	—	—	—
1994–95	Chicago Wolves	IHL	18	4	4	8	13	—	—	—	—	—
1994–95	Fort Wayne Komets	IHL	22	9	14	23	8	4	1	2	3	4
1995–96	Fort Wayne Komets	IHL	38	8	12	20	34	—	—	—	—	—
1996–97	Mississippi Sea Wolves	ECHL	69	34	56	90	34	3	1	3	4	4
1997–98	Mississippi Sea Wolves	ECHL	29	7	15	22	30	—	—	—	—	—
NHL totals			9	0	0	0	8	—	—	—	—	—
AHL totals			180	53	87	140	102	27	8	11	19	20
IHL totals			376	150	194	344	333	25	14	14	28	24
NHL totals			9	0	0	0	8	—	—	—	—	—

=== International ===
Year	Team	Event	GP	G	A	Pts	PIM
1985	United States	WJC	7	0	2	2	2
Junior totals			7	0	2	2	2

== Awards ==
- WHL West Second All-Star Team – 1984 & 1985
