= Ken Yaremchuk =

Canadian ice hockey player

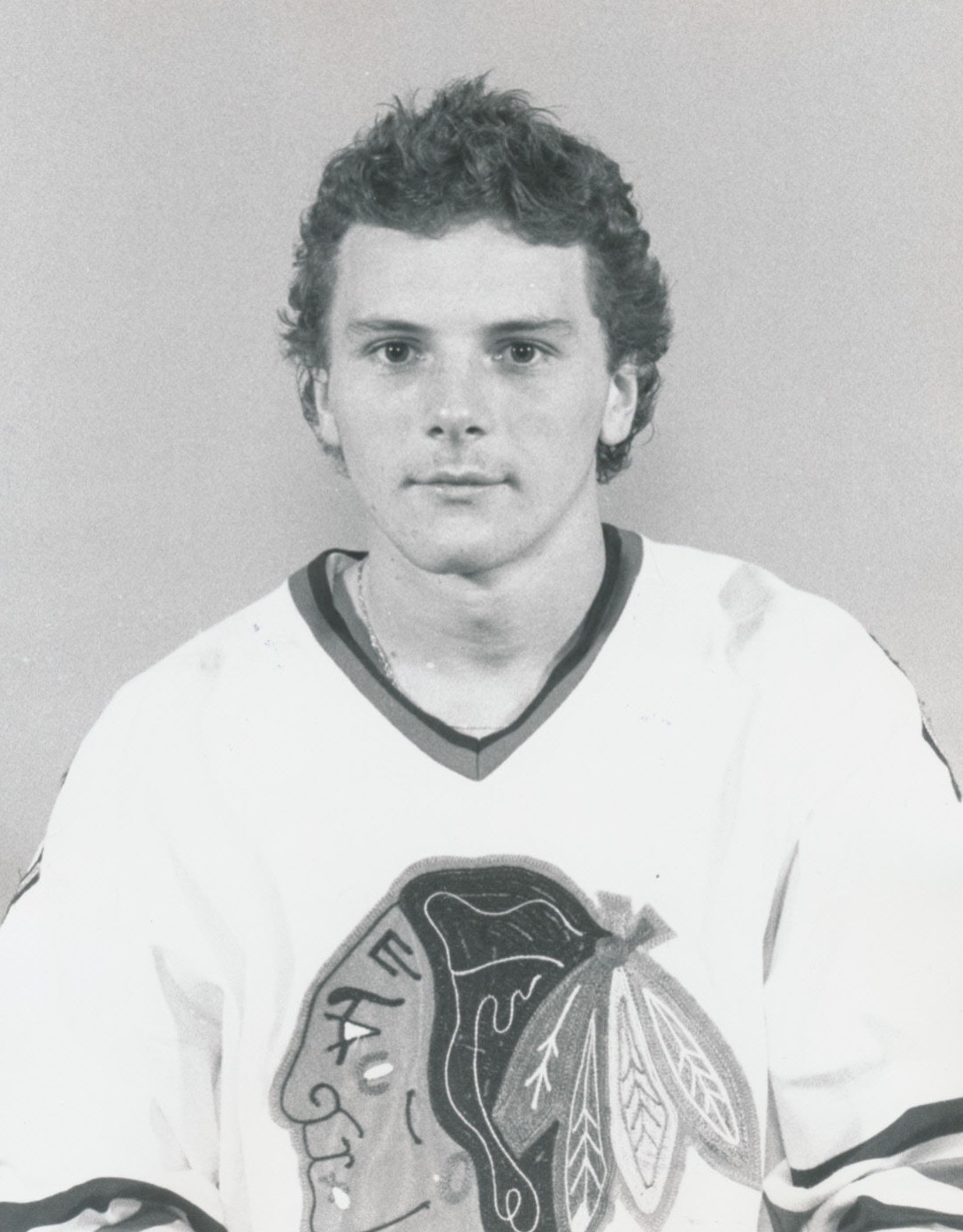
- Born: January 1, 1964 (age 62) Edmonton, Alberta, Canada
- Height: 5 ft 11 in (180 cm)
- Weight: 183 lb (83 kg; 13 st 1 lb)
- Position: Centre
- Shot: Right
- Played for: Chicago Blackhawks; Toronto Maple Leafs; HC Asiago; EV Zug; HC Davos; Rapperswil-Jona Lakers
- National team: Canada
- NHL draft: 7th overall, 1982; Chicago Black Hawks
- Playing career: 1983–1999

Ken Yaremchuk (born January 1, 1964) is a Canadian former professional ice hockey player who played 235 games in the National Hockey League. He played with the Toronto Maple Leafs and Chicago Black Hawks. He also competed in the men's tournament at the 1988 Winter Olympics.

Ken is the brother of Gary Yaremchuk. He has a distant relative named Tyler Yaremchuk, who is a sports media content creator.

== Career statistics ==
=== Regular season and playoffs ===
			Regular season					Playoffs
Season	Team	League	GP	G	A	Pts	PIM	GP	G	A	Pts	PIM
1979–80	Fort Saskatchewan Traders	AJHL	59	40	72	112	39	—	—	—	—	—
1979–80	Portland Winterhawks	WHL	—	—	—	—	—	2	1	0	1	0
1980–81	Portland Winterhawks	WHL	72	35	72	107	105	9	2	8	10	24
1981–82	Portland Winterhawks	WHL	72	58	99	157	181	15	10	21	31	12
1982–83	Portland Winterhawks	WHL	66	51	109	160	76	14	11	15	26	12
1983–84	Chicago Black Hawks	NHL	47	6	7	13	19	1	0	0	0	0
1984–85	Milwaukee Admirals	IHL	7	4	6	10	9	—	—	—	—	—
1984–85	Chicago Black Hawks	NHL	63	10	16	26	16	15	5	5	10	37
1985–86	Chicago Black Hawks	NHL	78	14	20	34	43	3	1	1	2	2
1986–87	Newmarket Saints	AHL	14	2	4	6	21	—	—	—	—	—
1986–87	Toronto Maple Leafs	NHL	20	3	8	11	16	6	0	0	0	0
1987–88	Canada	Intl	46	18	21	39	65	—	—	—	—	—
1987–88	Toronto Maple Leafs	NHL	16	2	5	7	10	6	0	2	2	10
1988–89	Newmarket Saints	AHL	55	25	33	58	145	5	7	7	14	12
1988–89	Toronto Maple Leafs	NHL	11	1	0	1	2	—	—	—	—	—
1989–90	HC Asiago	ITA	40	42	82	124	40	—	—	—	—	—
1990–91	EV Zug	NDA	22	14	14	28	49	3	1	1	2	20
1991–92	EV Zug	NDA	31	16	22	38	35	5	4	3	7	30
1991–92	Canada	Intl	3	0	0	0	0	—	—	—	—	—
1992–93	EV Zug	NDA	36	27	33	60	61	5	0	1	1	18
1992–93	Canada	Intl	2	0	5	5	0	—	—	—	—	—
1993–94	EV Zug	NDA	36	17	37	54	17	2	1	0	1	0
1994–95	EV Zug	NDA	36	26	37	63	55	12	5	12	17	24
1995–96	EV Zug	NDA	26	16	30	46	69	6	1	4	5	6
1996–97	HC Davos	NDA	46	31	38	69	60	5	2	2	4	16
1997–98	HC Davos	NDA	39	20	22	42	76	18	11	14	25	34
1998–99	Rapperswil–Jona Lakers	NDA	45	14	20	34	103	4	0	1	1	10
NHL totals			235	36	56	92	106	31	6	8	14	49
NDA totals			317	181	253	434	525	60	25	38	63	158

=== International ===
Year	Team	Event	GP	G	A	Pts	PIM
1988	Canada	OG	8	3	3	6	2
Senior totals			8	3	3	6	2

== Awards, honors and achievements ==
- WHL First All-Star Team – 1982
- WHL Second All-Star Team – 1983
- CHL Memorial Cup champion — 1983.
- Inducted into the Portland Winterhawks Hall of Fame (2023).
- His #15 Jersey was retired by the Portland Winterhawks on March 7, 2026.

== Personal ==
Yaremchuk has several sons. Nolan (Forward) and Austin (Defence) both play for Grant MacEwan College.

Preceded by Tony Tanti	Chicago Blackhawks first-round draft pick 1982	Succeeded by Bruce Cassidy
