= Norm Schmidt =

Canadian ice hockey defenceman

- Born: 24 January 1963 (age 63) Sault Ste. Marie, Ontario, Canada
- Height: 5 ft 11 in (180 cm)
- Weight: 190 lb (86 kg; 13 st 8 lb)
- Position: Defence
- Shot: Right
- Played for: Pittsburgh Penguins
- NHL draft: 70th overall, 1981; Pittsburgh Penguins
- Playing career: 1983–1988

Norm Schmidt (born January 24, 1963) is a Canadian former professional ice hockey defenceman who played 125 games in the National Hockey League for the Pittsburgh Penguins between 1983 and 1987.

Schmidt was born in Sault Ste. Marie, Ontario. As a youth, he played in the 1976 Quebec International Pee-Wee Hockey Tournament with a minor ice hockey team from Sault Ste. Marie.

== Career statistics ==
=== Regular season and playoffs ===
			Regular season					Playoffs
Season	Team	League	GP	G	A	Pts	PIM	GP	G	A	Pts	PIM
1979–80	Soo Thunderbirds	IJBHL	18	8	16	24	—	—	—	—	—	—
1979–80	Sault Ste. Marie Greyhounds	OMJHL	6	0	0	0	5	—	—	—	—	—
1980–81	Oshawa Generals	OHL	65	12	25	37	73	11	2	5	7	25
1981–82	Oshawa Generals	OHL	67	13	48	61	172	12	6	10	16	45
1982–83	Oshawa Generals	OHL	61	21	49	70	114	17	4	16	20	47
1982–83	Oshawa Generals	M-Cup	—	—	—	—	—	5	4	1	5	10
1983–84	Pittsburgh Penguins	NHL	34	6	12	18	12	—	—	—	—	—
1983–84	Baltimore Skipjacks	AHL	43	4	12	16	31	—	—	—	—	—
1984–85	Baltimore Skipjacks	AHL	33	0	22	22	31	—	—	—	—	—
1985–86	Pittsburgh Penguins	NHL	66	15	14	29	57	—	—	—	—	—
1986–87	Pittsburgh Penguins	NHL	20	1	5	6	4	—	—	—	—	—
1986–87	Baltimore Skipjacks	AHL	36	4	7	11	25	—	—	—	—	—
1987–88	Pittsburgh Penguins	NHL	5	1	2	3	0	—	—	—	—	—
NHL totals			125	23	33	56	73	—	—	—	—	—
