= Randy Heath =

Canadian ice hockey player

- Born: November 11, 1964 (age 61) Vancouver, British Columbia, Canada
- Height: 5 ft 9 in (175 cm)
- Weight: 160 lb (73 kg; 11 st 6 lb)
- Position: Left wing
- Shot: Left
- Played for: New York Rangers; Skellefteå HC; VIK Västerås HK
- NHL draft: 33rd overall, 1983; New York Rangers
- Playing career: 1984–1989

Randy T. Heath (born November 11, 1964) is a Canadian former professional ice hockey player. He played 13 games in the National Hockey League for the New York Rangers during the 1984–85 and 1985–86 seasons, and scored two goals and four assists for six points. He also played three seasons in Sweden, and retired in 1989.

== Career statistics ==
=== Regular season and playoffs ===
| | | | Regular season | | | | | Playoffs |
| Season | Team | League | GP | G | A | Pts | PIM | GP | G | A | Pts | PIM |
|---|---|---|---|---|---|---|---|---|---|---|---|---|
| 1980–81 | Vancouver Junior Canucks | BCJHL | 50 | 35 | 35 | 70 | 30 | — | — | — | — | — |
| 1980–81 | Portland Winter Hawks | WHL | 2 | 1 | 0 | 1 | 0 | — | — | — | — | — |
| 1981–82 | Portland Winter Hawks | WHL | 65 | 52 | 47 | 99 | 65 | 15 | 13 | 19 | 32 | 4 |
| 1981–82 | Portland Winter Hawks | M-Cup | — | — | — | — | — | 4 | 2 | 3 | 5 | 2 |
| 1982–83 | Portland Winter Hawks | WHL | 72 | 82 | 69 | 151 | 52 | 14 | 6 | 12 | 18 | 12 |
| 1982–83 | Portland Winter Hawks | M-Cup | — | — | — | — | — | 4 | 5 | 6 | 11 | 2 |
| 1983–84 | Portland Winter Hawks | WHL | 60 | 44 | 46 | 90 | 107 | 14 | 9 | 12 | 21 | 10 |
| 1984–85 | New York Rangers | NHL | 12 | 2 | 3 | 5 | 15 | — | — | — | — | — |
| 1984–85 | New Haven Nighthawks | AHL | 60 | 23 | 26 | 49 | 29 | — | — | — | — | — |
| 1985–86 | New York Rangers | NHL | 1 | 0 | 1 | 1 | 0 | — | — | — | — | — |
| 1985–86 | New Haven Nighthawks | AHL | 77 | 36 | 38 | 74 | 53 | 5 | 3 | 2 | 5 | 7 |
| 1986–87 | Skellefteå AIK | SWE | 36 | 12 | 14 | 26 | 40 | — | — | — | — | — |
| 1987–88 | IK Viking | SWE-2 | 31 | 26 | 25 | 51 | 50 | — | — | — | — | — |
| 1988–89 | Västerås IK | SWE | 22 | 5 | 10 | 15 | 14 | — | — | — | — | — |
| 1988–89 | Västerås IK | SWE-2 | 14 | 3 | 1 | 4 | 4 | — | — | — | — | — |
| NHL totals | | | 13 | 2 | 4 | 6 | 15 | — | — | — | — | — |

=== International ===
| Year | Team | Event | GP | G | A | Pts | PIM |
|---|---|---|---|---|---|---|---|
| 1984 | Canada | WJC | 7 | 3 | 6 | 9 | 12 |
| Junior totals | | | 7 | 3 | 6 | 9 | 12 |

== Awards ==
- WHL First All-Star Team – 1983
- WHL West First All-Star Team – 1984
