= 1983 Memorial Cup =

Canadian junior men's ice hockey championship

Tournament details
- Venue(s): Memorial Coliseum; Portland, Oregon
- Dates: May 7–14, 1983
- Teams: 4
- Host team: Portland Winter Hawks (WHL)

Final positions
- Champions: Portland Winter Hawks (WHL) (1st title)

Tournament statistics
- Games played: 8

The Memorial Cup trophy

The 1983 Memorial Cup was held May 7–14 at the Memorial Coliseum in Portland, Oregon. It was the 65th annual Memorial Cup competition and determined the major junior ice hockey champion of the Canadian Hockey League (CHL). Participating teams were the host team Portland Winter Hawks along with the Oshawa Generals, Verdun Juniors and Lethbridge Broncos who had won the Ontario Hockey League (OHL), Quebec Major Junior Hockey League (QMJHL) and Western Hockey League (WHL) championships respectively. Portland won their first Memorial Cup, defeating Oshawa in the final game.

1983 was the first time the Memorial Cup tournament featured four teams; it had previously involved three teams playing in a neutral host city since the round robin tournament format was adopted in 1972. The Winter Hawks were the first team to host the tournament, and the first to both participate and win the title despite failing to capture their league championship; they were eliminated by Lethbridge in the WHL finals. The Winter Hawks were the first American team to win the Memorial Cup.

== Teams ==
QMJHL Team OHL Team WHL Team Host Team

=== Lethbridge Broncos ===
The Lethbridge Broncos represented the Western Hockey League at the 1983 Memorial Cup. During the 1982–83 season, the Broncos finished in fifth place in the East Division, as they finished with a 38-31-3 record, earning 79 points. The Broncos scored 284 goals during the regular season, which ranked them last in the entire league. Lethbridge allowed 271 goals, which ranked them with the second fewest goals against in the WHL. In the first round of the post-season, the Broncos swept the Winnipeg Warriors in three games, advancing to the East Division semi-finals. In the Divisional semi-finals, the Broncos upset the top ranked team in the league, the Saskatoon Blades, winning the series four games to two. In the East Division finals, Lethbridge upset the favoured Calgary Wranglers four games to two, setting up a final series with the West Division winning Portland Winter Hawks. In the Ed Chynoweth Cup finals, the Broncos easily defeated the Winter Hawks, winning the series four games to one, to win the WHL championship and earn a berth into the 1983 Memorial Cup.

The Broncos offense was led by Ivan Krook, who scored 34 goals and a team high 88 points in 72 games. Krook added 12 goals and 24 points in 20 post-season games. Ron Sutter was second in team scoring during the regular season, scoring 35 goals and 83 points in 58 games, after he was returned to Lethbridge following beginning the season with the Philadelphia Flyers of the National Hockey League. Sutter followed up with 22 goals and 41 points in 20 playoff games, leading the club in post-season scoring. Rich Sutter, the twin brother of Ron, scored a team high 37 goals and 67 points in 64 games with the Broncos after beginning his season with the Pittsburgh Penguins of the NHL. In the post-season, Rich scored 14 goals and 23 points in 17 games. On defense, the Broncos were led by Bob Rouse, who was acquired by the Broncos from the Nanaimo Islanders in an early season trade. In 42 games with Lethbridge, Rouse scored eight goals and 38 points to lead the defense in scoring. In goal, the Broncos were led by Ken Wregget, who posted a 26-17-1 record with a 3.49 GAA and a .893 save percentage in 48 games.

The 1983 Memorial Cup was the first appearance at the tournament by the Lethbridge Broncos in team history.

=== Oshawa Generals ===
The Oshawa Generals represented the Ontario Hockey League at the 1983 Memorial Cup. The Generals finished the 1982–83 season in third place in the Leyden Division, earning a record of 45-22-3, while getting 93 points. Oshawa had the third best offense in the OHL, scoring 380 goals, while the club allowed a league low 255 goals. The Generals opened the post-season with a series win over the Belleville Bulls. The second round was a match-up against the Peterborough Petes in the Leyden Division semi-finals, as the Generals swept the Petes in four games. In the Leyden Division finals, the Generals defeated the first place Ottawa 67's four games to one, earning a berth into the J. Ross Robertson Cup finals against the Sault Ste. Marie Greyhounds. In the championship round, the Generals swept the Greyhounds in four games to clinch the OHL championship and earn a berth into the 1983 Memorial Cup.

The Generals offense was led by Dave Gans, who scored 41 goals and a team high 105 points in 64 games after beginning the season with the Los Angeles Kings of the National Hockey League. In 17 post-season games, Gans scored 14 goals and 38 points. John MacLean led the Generals with 47 goals, while adding 51 assists for 98 points in 66 games. MacLean followed up with 18 goals and 38 points in 17 post-season games, and emerged as a top prospect for the upcoming 1983 NHL entry draft. Don Biggs scored 22 goals and 75 points in 70 games with the Generals. Dave Andreychuk, who spent most of the season with the Buffalo Sabres, was assigned to the Generals late in the regular season. The Generals defense was led by Norm Schmidt, who scored 21 goals and 70 points in 61 games. Fellow defenseman Joe Cirella returned to Oshawa after beginning the season with the New Jersey Devils. In 55 games with the Generals, Cirella scored 13 goals and 68 points. Dale DeGray scored 20 goals and 50 points from the blueline during the regular season. In goal, the Generals were led by Peter Sidorkiewicz, who posted a 36-20-3 record and a 3.61 GAA in 60 games. Sidoriewicz and his backup, Jeff Hogg, shared the Dave Pinkney Trophy, which is awarded to the club with the fewest goals against.

The 1983 Memorial Cup was the Generals eighth appearance in club history and first since losing to the Edmonton Oil Kings at the 1966 Memorial Cup. The Generals won the Memorial Cup in 1939, 1940 and 1944.

=== Portland Winter Hawks ===
The Portland Winter Hawks represented the Western Hockey League as the host team at the 1983 Memorial Cup. The Winter Hawks finished the 1982–83 season with the best record in the West Division, as they club had a record of 50-22-0, earning 100 points. Portland had the highest scoring offense in the WHL, scoring 495 goals. The club allowed 387 goals, which ranked them ninth in the league. The Winter Hawks opened the post-season by sweeping the Seattle Breakers in the West Division semi-finals in four games. In the West Division finals, Portland defeated the Victoria Cougars four games to one, advancing to the Ed Chynoweth Cup finals. In the final round, the Winter Hawks were upset by the Lethbridge Broncos in five games. Despite the loss, Portland advanced to the Memorial Cup as the host team of the tournament.

The Winter Hawks offense was led by Ken Yaremchuk, who scored 55 goals and a team high 160 points in 66 games. Yaremchuk's 160 points ranked him fifth in WHL scoring. Randy Heath scored a league-high 82 goals, while earning 69 assists, to finish the season with 151 points in 72 games. Heath ranked just behind Yaremchuk in WHL scoring, as he finished in sixth place. Cam Neely emerged as a top prospect for the upcoming 1983 NHL entry draft, as he scored 56 goals and 120 points in 72 games. Grant Sasser scored 54 goals and 119 points in 70 games, as Portland had four 50+ goal scorers on the club. Alife Turcotte, who was acquired by Portland in a trade with the Nanaimo Islanders, scored 26 goals and 77 points in 39 games. In 14 playoff games, Turcotte scored 14 goals and a team high 32 points. Brad Duggan led the Winter Hawks defense, as in 72 games, he scored 16 goals and 100 points. Jim Playfair and John Kordic provided toughness on the blue line. In goal, Bruno Campese emerged as the starter in the post-season. In 35 regular season games, Campese earned a 21-9-0 record with a 5.47 GAA and a .864 save percentage.

The 1983 Memorial Cup was the second appearance by the club in team history. At the previous Memorial Cup in 1982, the Winter Hawks finished in third place.

=== Verdun Juniors ===
The Verdun Juniors represented the Quebec Major Junior Hockey League at the 1983 Memorial Cup. The Juniors finished the regular season in second place in the Lebel Division, as their record was 50-19-1, earning 101 points. During the regular season, the Juniors were the highest scoring club in the league, as Verdun scored 486 goals. The club allowed 303 goals, which ranked them second in the QMJHL. In the QMJHL quarter-finals, the Juniors swept the Trois-Rivières Draveurs in four games. In the QMJHL semi-finals, the Juniors defeated the Shawinigan Cataractes four games to two, advancing to the President's Cup. In the championship round, Verdun defeated the Longueuil Chevaliers four games to one to win the QMJHL championship and earn a berth into the 1983 Memorial Cup.

The Juniors offense was led by Pat LaFontaine, who led the QMJHL in scoring. LaFontaine scored 104 goals and 234 points in 70 games, winning the Jean Beliveau Trophy awarded to the highest scorer in the league. In 15 post-season games, LaFontaine scored 11 goals and 35 points, earning the Guy Lafleur Trophy, awarded to the Playoff MVP. LaFontaine also was awarded the Frank J. Selke Memorial Trophy, awarded to the Most Sportsmanlike Player in the QMJHL; the Michel Bergeron Trophy, awarded to the Offensive Rookie of the Year in the league; the Mike Bossy Trophy, awarded to the Best Pro Prospect in the league; and the Michel Briere Memorial Trophy, awarded to the MVP of the QMJHL. Lafontaine emerged as a top prospect for the upcoming 1983 NHL entry draft. Jean-Maurice Cool scored 65 goals and 149 points in 70 games, finishing second in team scoring and sixth in league scoring. Late in the season, the Juniors acquired Gerard Gallant from the Saint-Jean Castors. In 29 games with the Juniors, Gallant scored 26 goals and 75 points. In 15 playoff games, Gallant scored a team high 14 points, and recorded 33 points. On defense, Bill Campbell scored 35 goals and 99 points in 67 games. In goal, Gilles Heroux saw the bulk of playing time, earning a 39-18-1 record with a 4.41 GAA in 59 games. Backup Michel Campeau took over starting duties in the post-season.

The 1983 Memorial Cup was the first time in club history that the club took part in the tournament.

== Tournament ==
Since the adoption of the round robin tournament format in 1972, the Memorial Cup tournament had been held in a pre-selected, and often neutral, host city. Beginning in 1983, the Canadian Amateur Hockey Association chose to make the tournament a four team affair with a host team guaranteed to participate. The Portland Winter Hawks, who won the WHL championship in 1981–82, were chosen before the season to host the 1983 tournament. It was the first time Memorial Cup games were held outside of Canada, though Winter Hawks General Manager Brian Shaw had proposed the tournament return to its original east vs. west format.

Portland nearly won the WHL's President's Cup again in 1983, but lost in the finals to the Lethbridge Broncos who earned a trip to the tournament as the WHL champions. The Oshawa Generals won the J. Ross Robertson Cup as OHL champions by defeating the Sault Ste. Marie Greyhounds while the Verdun Juniors defeated the Trois-Rivières Draveurs to win the QMJHL's President's Cup.

The tournament was held as a single round-robin format, with the top team earning a place in the final, and the second and third place teams playing a semi-final. Oshawa opened the tournament with an 8–2 victory over Lethbridge on the strength of three goals in six minutes in the third period. In the second game, Portland held a 7–2 lead over Verdun after two periods, but surrendered four goals in the third, managing to hold on for a 7–6 victory. Verdun then defeated Lethbridge 4–3, eliminating the Broncos from the playoff round. Portland routed Oshawa 10–5 before losing to the Broncos in a game that had no impact on either team's future in the tournament. Oshawa defeated Verdun 5–1 in the final game of the round robin.

While all three teams had 2–1 records, the Generals and Juniors met again in the semi-finals, while the Winter Hawks advanced to the final on the basis of most goals scored. Verdun emerged from the first period with a 4–1 lead but were unable to hold off the Oshawa attack, falling 7–5 in the semi-final. The final was never in doubt, as the hometown Winter Hawks defeated Oshawa 8–3 on the strength of three goals by Cam Neely. In doing so, they became the first American team to win Canada's national junior championship.

The tournament was success at the gate. The championship game drew 9,527 fans for a tournament total of 54,090; second only to the 1977 Memorial Cup held in Vancouver.

=== Round-robin standings ===
Pos	Team	Pld	W	L	GF	GA	
1	Portland Winter Hawks (WHL Host)	3	2	1	20	20	Advanced directly to the championship game
2	Oshawa Generals (OHL)	3	2	1	18	13	Advanced to the semifinal game
3	Verdun Juniors (QMJHL)	3	1	2	11	15	Advanced to the semifinal game
4	Lethbridge Broncos (WHL)	3	1	2	14	15	

=== Scores ===
Round-robin

- May 7 – Oshawa 8–2 Lethbridge
- May 7 – Portland 7–6 Verdun
- May 8 – Verdun 4–3 Lethbridge
- May 8 – Portland 10–5 Oshawa
- May 9 – Lethbridge 9–3 Portland
- May 10 – Oshawa 5–1 Verdun

Semi-final

- May 12 – Oshawa 7–5 Verdun

Final

- May 14 – Portland 8–3 Oshawa

== Players ==
Goaltender Mike Vernon was the subject of controversy during the tournament. While he was a player for the Calgary Wranglers, he joined the Winter Hawks for the Memorial Cup tournament via a rule that allowed each team to add an extra goaltender from their league. Vernon turned down Lethbridge before agreeing to play with Portland, a decision that infuriated the Broncos who had lost their starting goaltender, Ken Wregget, to injury.

Several players from the Winter Hawks went on to play in the National Hockey League (NHL). Cam Neely played 13 seasons and was elected to the Hockey Hall of Fame in 2005. Vernon won the Stanley Cup with both the Calgary Flames and Detroit Red Wings during his career, and was inducted into the Hockey Hall of Fame in 2023. Oshawa's John MacLean won the Cup with the New Jersey Devils. The Sutter twins, Rich and Ron played for the Broncos, as did Mark Tinordi and Gerald Diduck. Also from Lethbridge, both Wregget and Troy Loney won the Stanley Cup with the Pittsburgh Penguins.

=== Winning roster ===
1982-83 Portland Winter Hawks
Goaltenders: – Bruno Campese; – Grey Hollomay; – Mike Vernon; – Ian Wood	Defencemen: – Brian Curran; – Brad Duggan; – Kelly Hubbard; – John Kordic; – Jim Playfair; – Bryan Walker	Wingers: – Randy Heath; – Derek Laxdal; – Tim Lorenz; – Cam Neely; – Richard Kromm; – Gord Walker	Centres: – Curt Brandolini; – Ray Ferraro; – Ray Podloski; – Grant Sasser; – Alfie Turcotte; – Ken Yaremchuk; Coach: Ken Hodge; General Manager: Brian C. Shaw

== Award winners ==
- Stafford Smythe Memorial Trophy (MVP): Alfie Turcotte, Portland
- George Parsons Trophy (Sportsmanship): David Gans, Oshawa
- Hap Emms Memorial Trophy (Goaltender): Mike Vernon, Portland

All-star team

- Goal: Peter Sidorkiewicz, Oshawa
- Defence: Joe Cirella, Oshawa; Jerome Carrier, Verdun
- Centre: Ken Yaremchuk, Portland
- Left wing: Randy Heath, Portland
- Right wing: John MacLean, Oshawa
