= Portland Winterhawks =

Western Hockey League team in Portland, Oregon

- City: Portland, Oregon
- League: Western Hockey League
- Conference: Western
- Division: U.S.
- Founded: 1950
- Home arena: Veterans Memorial Coliseum
- Colors: Biscuit black, buzzer red, squall gray, celly gold, ice white
- General manager: Mike Johnston
- Head coach: Kyle Gustafson
- Website: chl.ca/whl-winterhawks/

Franchise history
- 1950–1976: Edmonton Oil Kings
- 1976–2009: Portland Winter Hawks
- 2009–present: Portland Winterhawks

Championships
- Regular season titles: 4 (1979–80, 1997–98, 2012–13, 2019–20)
- Playoff championships: Ed Chynoweth Cup; 3 (1982, 1998, 2013); Memorial Cup; 2 (1983, 1998); Conference Championships; 5 (2010–11, 2011–12, 2012–13, 2013–14, 2023–24)

Current uniform

The Portland Winterhawks are a junior ice hockey team based in Portland, Oregon. Founded in 1950 as the Edmonton Oil Kings, the team relocated to Portland in 1976 and was known as the Winter Hawks until 2009. The team plays in the U.S. Division of the Western Hockey League (WHL), one of three constituent leagues of the Canadian Hockey League (CHL). The Winterhawks have made a record 13 appearances in the WHL championship series—including a record-tying four straight from 2011 to 2014—winning the Ed Chynoweth Cup three times and the Memorial Cup twice. They were the first American-based team to participate in and win either championship. The team plays its home games at Veterans Memorial Coliseum.

== History ==
The franchise was founded in 1950 as the Edmonton Oil Kings. Under Bill Hunter's leadership, the Oil Kings were a founding franchise of the Western Canada Junior Hockey League in 1966. Despite winning two league titles in the early 1970s, the arrival of Hunter's Edmonton Oilers in the World Hockey Association precipitated the relocation of the franchise. In the spring of 1976, it was announced that the franchise, owned by Brian Shaw, would move to Portland, making it the league's first American team and leading the league to simplify its name to the Western Hockey League. The success of the team would lead to the establishment of several more teams in the Northwest United States over the ensuing decades.

In their first season in Portland, the club would lose 7–2 to a travelling Russian club in an exhibition match watched by more than 5,000 fans. Overall, the team carried over its success from its early days in Edmonton—in their first eleven seasons in Portland, the Winterhawks failed to make the playoffs only once, and advanced to the league final five times, winning their first Ed Chynoweth Cup in 1982 and the Memorial Cup in 1983. In 1982, the Winterhawks became the first American team to win the WHL championship and also the first to compete for the Memorial Cup. In 1983, despite losing the WHL championship series, the Winterhawks participated in the Memorial Cup by virtue of hosting the tournament—the first American team to do so. Brian Shaw had advocated for the participation of a fourth team as tournament host, and after the Winterhawks—led by star rookie Cam Neely and goaltender Mike Vernon—won the tournament, the CHL opted to continue with the new format going forward.

The Winterhawks hosted the tournament again in 1986, awarded the tournament when it became clear that the original host of New Westminster would be unable to host due to also hosting the 1986 World Expo. In 1998, the Winterhawks, led by Brenden Morrow and Marián Hossa, earned their way back to the Memorial Cup—hosted by the rival Spokane Chiefs—with an Ed Chynoweth Cup championship; they won their second Memorial Cup title with a 4–3 overtime win in the final over the Guelph Storm.

The Winterhawks advanced to four consecutive WHL championship series from 2011 to 2014, just the second team to do so after the New Westminster Bruins won four consecutive titles from 1975 to 1978. From 2012 to 2014, the Winterhawks met the revived Edmonton Oil Kings in each league final. The Winterhawks won one of the finals, in 2013, to advance to the team's fifth Memorial Cup tournament, where it lost the final to the Halifax Mooseheads.

On November 28, 2012, the WHL announced sanctions against the Winterhawks for a series of player benefits violations over the four previous seasons. As punishment for the violations, WHL Commissioner Ron Robison suspended the team from participation in the first five rounds of the 2013 WHL Bantam Draft, and the team forfeited their first-round picks from the 2014 to 2017 drafts and was fined $200,000. The WHL also suspended General Manager and Head Coach Mike Johnston for the remainder of the 2012–13 season, including the 2013 WHL playoffs.

In the midst of the COVID-19 pandemic in May 2020, the franchise filed for Chapter 15 bankruptcy. Although the Winterhawks were financially stable, owner Bill Gallacher used the team as security against an unpaid loan; Gallacher ultimately had to sell the franchise in order to repay debts. The WHL Board of Governors approved Winterhawks Sports Group (WSG) as the new owners of the franchise, effective January 1, 2021. Along with the Winterhawks franchise, WSG also acquired the operations of the Winterhawks Skating Center in Beaverton, Oregon, and the Winterhawks Junior Hockey programs. Prior to the start of the 2021–22 WHL season, the team announced that it would be returning to the Veterans Memorial Coliseum full-time after previously dividing games between the Coliseum and Moda Center since 1995.

The 2023–24 season saw the Winterhawks advance to their first championship final in ten seasons, where they were defeated by the Moose Jaw Warriors in four consecutive games.

== Uniforms, logos, and mascot ==
The Winterhawks logo from 1976 to 2021, adopted from the Chicago Blackhawks.

The team was known as the Winter Hawks until May 2009, when it issued a press release stating that, "the space...has announced its retirement", and that the team was renaming itself the Winterhawks.

Upon moving to Portland in 1976, the Winter Hawks accepted a donation of old jerseys from the National Hockey League's Chicago Black Hawks, and they kept the design for nearly half of a century. Amid pressure for sports teams to abandon Native American caricatures, new ownership opted to rebrand the Winterhawks in 2021. The team unveiled its new look on July 14, 2021, featuring new colors and a new hawk logo.

The Winterhawks' also retired their Tom-A-Hawk bird mascot in 2019.

== Championships ==
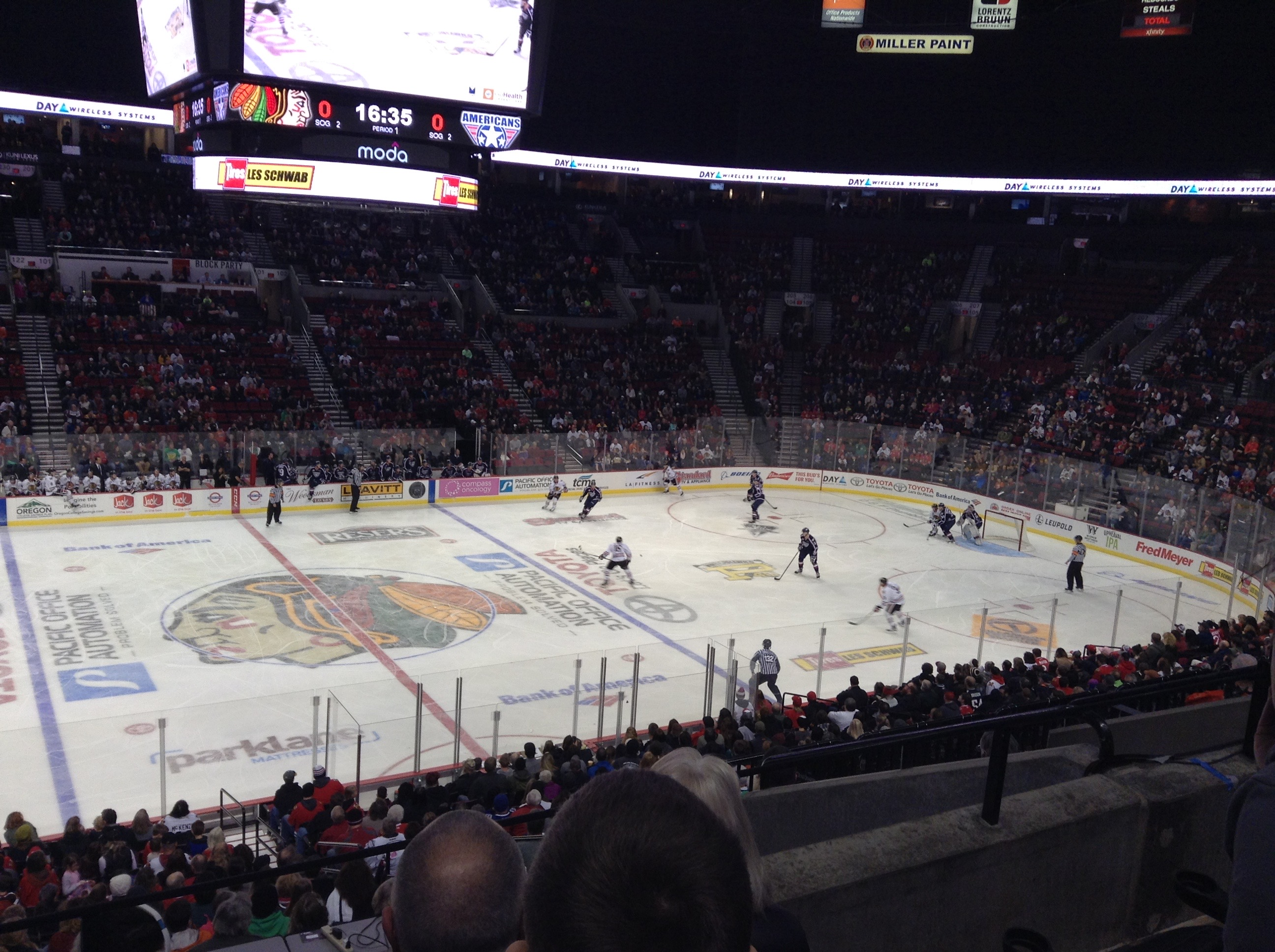
The Winterhawks hosting the Tri-City Americans on January 24, 2016.

- Memorial Cup (2): 1982–83, 1997–98
- Ed Chynoweth Cup (3): 1981–82, 1997–98, 2012–13
- Scotty Munro Memorial Trophy (4): 1979–80, 1997–98, 2012–13, 2019–20
- Conference Champions (5): 2010–11, 2011–12, 2012–13, 2013–14, 2023–24
- Division Playoff Champions (8): 1978–79, 1981–82, 1982–83, 1986–87, 1988–89, 1992–93, 1997–98, 2000–01
- Regular Season Division Champions (15): 1977–78, 1978–79, 1979–80, 1981–82, 1982–83, 1988–89, 1992–93, 1996–97, 1997–98, 2001–02, 2010–11, 2012–13, 2013–14, 2019–20, 2023–24

=== Memorial Cup finals history ===
The Winterhawks have advanced to three Memorial Cup finals.

- 1983: Win, 8–3 vs Oshawa Generals
- 1998: Win, 4–3 (OT) vs Guelph Storm
- 2013: Loss, 4–6 vs Halifax Mooseheads

=== WHL Championship history ===
Winterhawks appearances in the Western Hockey League Championship series:

- 1978–79: Loss, 2–4 vs Brandon Wheat Kings
- 1981–82: Win, 4–1 vs Regina Pats
- 1982-83: Loss, 1–4 vs Lethbridge Broncos
- 1986-87: Loss, 3–4 vs Medicine Hat Tigers
- 1988–89: Loss, 0–4 vs Swift Current Broncos
- 1992–93: Loss, 3–4 vs Swift Current Broncos
- 1997–98: Win, 4–0 vs Brandon Wheat Kings
- 2000–01: Loss, 1–4 vs Red Deer Rebels
- 2010–11: Loss, 1–4 vs Kootenay Ice
- 2011–12: Loss, 3–4 vs Edmonton Oil Kings
- 2012–13: Win, 4–2 vs Edmonton Oil Kings
- 2013–14: Loss, 3–4 vs Edmonton Oil Kings
- 2023–24: Loss, 0–4 vs Moose Jaw Warriors

== Season-by-season record ==
Note: GP = Games played, W = Wins, L = Losses, T = Ties, OTL = Overtime losses, Pts = Points, GF = Goals for, GA = Goals against

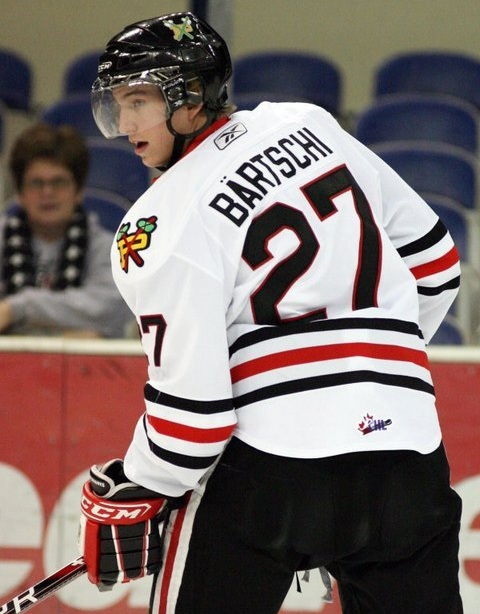
Sven Baertschi played for the Winterhawks from 2010 to 2012.

Season	GP	W	L	T	OTL	GF	GA	Points	Finish	Playoffs
1976–77	72	36	29	7	-	359	294	79	3rd West	Lost semifinal
1977–78	72	41	20	11	-	361	296	93	1st West	Eliminated in West Division round robin
1978–79	72	49	10	13	-	432	265	111	1st West	Lost final
1979–80	72	53	18	1	-	398	293	107	1st West	Eliminated in West Division round robin
1980–81	72	56	15	1	-	443	266	113	2nd West	Lost West Division final
1981–82	72	46	24	2	-	380	323	94	1st West	Won Championship
1982–83	72	50	22	0	-	495	387	100	1st West	Lost final; Won Memorial Cup
1983–84	72	33	39	0	-	430	449	66	3rd West	Lost West Division final
1984–85	72	27	44	1	-	365	442	55	4th West	Lost West Division semifinal
1985–86	72	47	24	1	-	438	348	95	2nd West	Lost West Division final
1986–87	72	47	23	2	-	439	355	96	2nd West	Lost final
1987–88	72	24	45	3	-	328	449	51	6th West	Did not qualify
1988–89	72	40	28	4	-	408	395	84	1st West	Lost final
1989–90	72	24	45	3	-	322	426	51	5th West	Did not qualify
1990–91	72	17	53	2	-	298	450	36	5th West	Did not qualify
1991–92	72	31	37	4	-	314	342	66	5th West	Lost West Division quarterfinal
1992–93	72	45	24	3	-	343	275	93	1st West	Lost final
1993–94	72	49	22	1	-	392	260	99	2nd West	Lost West Division final
1994–95	72	23	43	6	-	240	308	52	6th West	Lost West Division semifinal
1995–96	72	30	39	3	-	283	301	63	6th West	Lost West Division quarterfinal
1996–97	72	46	21	5	-	300	196	97	1st West	Lost West Division quarterfinal
1997–98	72	53	14	5	-	342	203	111	1st West	Won Championship and Memorial Cup
1998–99	72	23	36	13	-	215	278	59	5th West	Lost West Division quarterfinal
1999–00	72	16	49	7	0	173	296	39	7th West	Did not qualify
2000–01	72	37	27	5	3	254	237	82	2nd West	Lost final
2001–02	72	36	25	5	6	269	243	83	1st U.S.	Lost Western Conference quarterfinal
2002–03	72	19	40	8	5	192	243	51	3rd U.S.	Lost Western Conference quarterfinal
2003–04	72	34	29	6	3	199	206	77	2nd U.S.	Lost Western Conference quarterfinal
2004–05	72	35	27	5	5	204	198	80	2nd U.S.	Lost Western Conference quarterfinal
2005–06	72	32	32	3	5	204	258	72	3rd U.S.	Lost Western Conference semifinal
2006–07	72	17	52	1	2	146	316	37	5th U.S.	Did not qualify
2007–08	72	11	58	2	1	132	318	25	5th U.S.	Did not qualify
2008–09	72	19	48	3	2	176	288	43	5th U.S.	Did not qualify
Season	GP	W	L	T	OTL	GF	GA	Points	Finish	Playoffs
2009–10	72	44	25	2	1	266	241	91	4th U.S.	Lost Western Conference semifinal
2010–11	72	50	19	0	3	303	227	103	1st U.S.	Lost final
2011–12	72	49	19	3	1	328	229	102	2nd U.S.	Lost final
2012–13	72	57	12	1	2	334	169	117	1st U.S.	Won Championship; Lost Memorial Cup final
2013–14	72	54	13	2	3	338	207	113	1st U.S.	Lost final
2014–15	72	43	23	2	4	287	237	92	2nd U.S.	Lost Western Conference final
2015–16	72	34	31	6	1	228	227	75	3rd U.S.	Lost Western Conference quarterfinal
2016–17	72	40	28	1	3	278	256	84	4th U.S.	Lost Western Conference semifinal
2017–18	72	44	22	1	5	274	214	94	2nd U.S.	Lost Western Conference semifinal
2018–19	68	40	22	3	3	258	210	86	3rd U.S.	Lost Western Conference quarterfinal
2019–20	63	45	11	3	4	270	164	97	1st U.S.	Playoffs cancelled due to COVID-19 pandemic
2020–21	24	13	8	3	0	96	72	29	2nd U.S.	No playoffs held due to COVID-19 pandemic
2021–22	68	47	16	3	2	298	192	99	2nd U.S.	Lost Western Conference semifinal
2022–23	68	40	20	5	3	244	218	88	2nd U.S.	Lost Western Conference semifinal
2023–24	68	48	15	4	1	330	204	101	1st U.S.	Lost final
2024–25	68	36	28	3	1	261	269	76	3rd U.S.	Lost Western Conference final
2025–26	68	30	30	7	1	235	264	68	4th U.S.	Lost Western Conference quarterfinal

== Players ==
=== Hall of Famers ===
Four former Portland Winter Hawks alumni are inductees to the Hockey Hall of Fame: Mark Messier, Cam Neely, Marian Hossa, and Mike Vernon.

This is a list of former players inducted into the Portland Winter Hawks franchise Hall of Fame.

Portland Winter Hawks franchise Hall of Fame inductees
Hall of Fame players
Ken Hodge; Todd Robinson; Jim Benning	Dennis Holland; Cam Neely; Braydon Coburn	Brent Peterson; Glen Wesley	Andrew Ference; Grant Sasser	Marian Hossa; Randy Heath	Brenden Morrow; Ken Yaremchuk

=== Retired numbers ===
Portland Winterhawks retired numbers
No.	Player	Position	Career	No. retirement
15	Ken Yaremchuk	Centre	1979–1983	March 7, 2026
21	Cam Neely	RW	1982–1984	March 18, 2023

=== NHL alumni ===
List of Portland Winterhawks alumni who have graduated to play in the National Hockey League.

- Rodrigo Abols
- Jim Agnew
- Marek Alscher
- Dave Archibald
- Dave Babych
- Wayne Babych
- Sven Baertschi
- Jozef Balej
- Jeff Bandura
- Dave Barr
- Ryan Bast
- Kieffer Bellows
- Brian Benning
- Jim Benning
- Oliver Bjorkstrand
- James Black
- Joachim Blichfeld
- Lonny Bohonos
- Keith Brown
- Luca Cagnoni
- Dennis Cholowski
- Nick Cicek
- Braydon Coburn
- Ed Cooper
- Craig Cunningham
- Brian Curran
- Tony Currie
- Byron Dafoe
- Nate Danielson
- Matt Davidson
- Adam Deadmarsh
- Chase De Leo
- Jim Dobson
- Brandon Dubinsky
- Matt Dumba
- Brent Fedyk
- Andrew Ference
- Ray Ferraro
- Jeff Finley
- Colin Forbes
- Michael Funk
- Joaquin Gage
- Paul Gaustad
- Rob Geale
- Cody Glass
- Josh Green
- Jannik Hansen
- Randy Heath
- Adin Hill
- Joel Hofer
- Marcel Hossa
- Marian Hossa
- Dave Hoyda
- Cale Hulse
- Jamie Huscroft
- Randy Ireland
- Brad Isbister
- Seth Jarvis
- Ryan Johansen
- Henri Jokiharju
- Caleb Jones
- Seth Jones
- Jakub Klepis
- Rob Klinkhammer
- Steve Konowalchuk
- John Kordic
- Tyson Kozak
- Richard Kromm
- Jason LaBarbera
- Scott Langkow
- James Latos
- Derek Laxdal
- Doug Lecuyer
- Taylor Leier
- Brendan Leipsic
- Jamie Linden
- John Ludvig
- David Mackey
- Clint Malarchuk
- Darrell May
- Jason McBain
- Frazer McLaren
- Cody McLeod
- Mark Messier
- Brendan Mikkelson
- Roy Mitchell
- Brenden Morrow
- Joe Morrow
- Paul Mulvey
- Brantt Myhres
- Cam Neely
- Scott Nichol
- Nino Niederreiter
- Gary Nylund
- Josh Olson
- Perry Pelensky
- Nic Petan
- Brent Peterson
- Jim Playfair
- Larry Playfair
- Andrej Podkonicky
- Ray Podloski
- Derrick Pouliot
- Nolan Pratt
- Ty Rattie
- Richie Regehr
- Florent Robidoux
- Jeff Rohlicek
- Grant Sasser
- Michael Sauer
- Luca Sbisa
- Dave Scatchard
- Colton Sceviour
- Jeff Sharples
- Brandon Smith
- Ryan Stewart
- Joey Tetarenko
- Mike Toal
- Tim Tookey
- Alfie Turcotte
- Dominic Turgeon
- Perry Turnbull
- Randy Turnbull
- Nick Vachon
- Mike Vernon
- Terry Virtue
- Mickey Volcan
- Gord Walker
- Matt Walker
- Blake Wesley
- Glen Wesley
- Jason Wiemer
- Dan Woodley
- Tyler Wotherspoon
- Gary Yaremchuk
- Ken Yaremchuk
- Brad Zavisha
- Richard Zednik

=== First-round draft picks ===
Winterhawks players chosen in the first round of the NHL entry draft:

- 1978: Wayne Babych, 3rd overall, St. Louis
- 1978: Brent Peterson, 12th overall, Detroit
- 1978: Larry Playfair, 13th overall, Buffalo
- 1979: Perry Turnbull, 2nd overall, St. Louis
- 1979: Keith Brown, 7th overall, Chicago
- 1980: Dave Babych, 2nd overall, Winnipeg
- 1981: Jim Benning, 6th overall, Toronto
- 1982: Gary Nylund, 3rd overall, Toronto
- 1982: Ken Yaremchuk, 7th overall, Chicago
- 1982: Jim Playfair, 20th overall, Edmonton
- 1983: Cam Neely, 9th overall, Vancouver
- 1983: Alfie Turcotte, 17th overall, Montreal
- 1986: Dan Woodley, 7th overall, Vancouver
- 1987: Glen Wesley, 3rd overall, Boston
- 1987: Dave Archibald, 6th overall, Minnesota
- 1993: Adam Deadmarsh, 14th overall, Quebec
- 1994: Jason Wiemer, 8th overall, Tampa Bay
- 1997: Brenden Morrow, 25th overall, Dallas
- 1997: Marian Hossa, 12th overall, Ottawa
- 2000: Marcel Hossa, 16th overall, Montreal
- 2002: Jakub Klepis, 16th overall, Ottawa
- 2003: Braydon Coburn, 8th overall, Atlanta
- 2010: Ryan Johansen, 4th overall, Columbus
- 2010: Nino Niederreiter, 5th overall, NY Islanders
- 2011: Sven Baertschi, 13th overall, Calgary
- 2011: Joe Morrow, 23rd overall, Pittsburgh
- 2012: Derrick Pouliot, 8th overall, Pittsburgh
- 2013: Seth Jones, 4th overall, Nashville
- 2017: Cody Glass, 6th overall, Vegas
- 2017: Henri Jokiharju, 29th overall, Chicago
- 2020: Seth Jarvis, 13th overall, Carolina

== Team records ==
During the 2012–13 season, Winterhawks captain Troy Rutkowski established the new team record for most regular games played for the Winterhawks. His career total of 351 games surpassed the previous mark of 328 games set by Kevin Haupt in the 1998–99 season.

Career records
Statistic	Player	Total	Career
Most goals	Dennis Holland	179	1985–1989
Most assists	Todd Robinson	325	1994–1999
Most points	Todd Robinson	470	1994–1999
Most points, defenceman	Brandon Smith	232	1989–1994
Most games played	Troy Rutkowski	351	2008–2013
Most wins (goalie)	Mac Carruth	117	2009–2013
Most shutouts (goalie)	Mac Carruth	11	2009–2013
