= 1983–84 WHL season =

Junior ice hockey season

- League: Western Hockey League
- Sport: Ice hockey
- Teams: 14

Regular season
- Scotty Munro Memorial Trophy: Kamloops Junior Oilers (1)
- Season MVP: Ray Ferraro (Brandon Wheat Kings)
- Top scorer: Ray Ferraro (Brandon Wheat Kings)

Playoffs
- Finals champions: Kamloops Junior Oilers (1)
- Runners-up: Regina Pats

WHL seasons
- 1982–83 1984–85

1983–84 CHL season
- League: Canadian Hockey League
- Sport: Ice hockey
- Teams: 40

OHL

QMJHL

WHL

Memorial Cup
- Finals champions: Ottawa 67's (OHL) (1st title)
- Runners-up: Kitchener Rangers (OHL)

The 1983–84 WHL season was the 18th season of the Western Hockey League (WHL). The Kamloops Junior Oilers won both the Scotty Munro Memorial Trophy for best regular season record and the President's Cup as playoff champions—defeating the Regina Pats in the championship series—both for the first time in club history.

The season was the first for the second incarnation of the New Westminster Bruins after the Nanaimo Islanders relocated from Vancouver Island prior to the season. The season saw Ray Ferraro set a league record with a 108-goal season for the Brandon Wheat Kings.

== Team changes ==
- The Nanaimo Islanders are relocated to New Westminster, British Columbia, becoming the New Westminster Bruins.

== Regular season ==
=== Final standings ===
East Division
| Pos | Team | Pld | W | L | T | GF | GA | Pts |
|---|---|---|---|---|---|---|---|---|
| 1 | x – Regina Pats | 72 | 48 | 23 | 1 | 426 | 284 | 97 |
| 2 | x – Medicine Hat Tigers | 72 | 45 | 26 | 1 | 404 | 288 | 91 |
| 3 | x – Brandon Wheat Kings | 72 | 44 | 26 | 2 | 463 | 346 | 90 |
| 4 | x – Lethbridge Broncos | 72 | 44 | 28 | 0 | 271 | 256 | 88 |
| 5 | x – Prince Albert Raiders | 72 | 41 | 29 | 2 | 411 | 357 | 84 |
| 6 | x – Calgary Wranglers | 72 | 36 | 36 | 0 | 353 | 345 | 72 |
| 7 | Saskatoon Blades | 72 | 36 | 36 | 0 | 347 | 350 | 72 |
| 8 | Winnipeg Warriors | 72 | 9 | 63 | 0 | 239 | 580 | 18 |

x – qualified for playoffs

West Division
| Pos | Team | Pld | W | L | T | GF | GA | Pts |
|---|---|---|---|---|---|---|---|---|
| 1 | x – Kamloops Junior Oilers | 72 | 50 | 22 | 0 | 467 | 332 | 100 |
| 2 | x – New Westminster Bruins | 72 | 34 | 36 | 2 | 304 | 348 | 70 |
| 3 | x – Portland Winter Hawks | 72 | 33 | 39 | 0 | 430 | 449 | 66 |
| 4 | x – Seattle Breakers | 72 | 32 | 39 | 1 | 350 | 379 | 65 |
| 5 | Victoria Cougars | 72 | 32 | 40 | 0 | 340 | 338 | 64 |
| 6 | Kelowna Wings | 72 | 15 | 56 | 1 | 295 | 448 | 31 |

x – qualified for playoffs

=== Scoring leaders ===
Note: GP = Games played; G = Goals; A = Assists; Pts = Points; PIM = Penalties in minutes

| Player | Team | GP | G | A | Pts | PIM |
|---|---|---|---|---|---|---|
| Ray Ferraro | Brandon Wheat Kings | 72 | 108 | 84 | 192 | 84 |
| Dan Hodgson | Prince Albert Raiders | 66 | 62 | 119 | 181 | 65 |
| Dale Derkatch | Regina Pats | 62 | 72 | 87 | 159 | 92 |
| Taylor Hall | Regina Pats | 69 | 63 | 79 | 142 | 42 |
| Cam Plante | Brandon Wheat Kings | 72 | 22 | 118 | 140 | 96 |
| Dean Evason | Kamloops Junior Oilers | 57 | 49 | 88 | 137 | 89 |
| Cliff Ronning | New Westminster Bruins | 71 | 69 | 67 | 136 | 10 |
| Mark Lamb | Medicine Hat Tigers | 72 | 59 | 77 | 136 | 30 |
| Fabian Joseph | Victoria Cougars | 72 | 52 | 75 | 127 | 27 |
| Dave Pasin | Prince Albert Raiders | 71 | 68 | 54 | 122 | 68 |

== 1984 WHL Playoffs ==
=== Qualification playoff ===
- Calgary defeated Saskatoon 8–7 in overtime to claim the sixth-place tiebreaker.

=== First round ===
- Regina defeated Calgary 4 games to 0
- Medicine Hat defeated Prince Albert 4 games to 1
- Brandon defeated Lethbridge 4 games to 1

=== East division round-robin ===
- Medicine Hat (4–0) advanced directly to the division final.
- Regina (2–2) and Brandon (0–4) played in the division semifinal

=== Division semi-finals ===
- Medicine Hat earned a bye
- Regina defeated Brandon 2 games to 1
- Kamloops defeated Seattle 5 games to 0
- Portland defeated New Westminster 5 games to 4

=== Division finals ===
- Regina defeated Medicine Hat 4 games to 1
- Kamloops defeated Portland 5 games to 0

=== WHL Championship ===
- Kamloops defeated Regina 4 games to 3

== WHL awards ==
Most Valuable Player: Ray Ferraro, Brandon Wheat Kings
Scholastic Player of the Year – Daryl K. (Doc) Seaman Trophy: Ken Baumgartner, Prince Albert Raiders
Top scorer – Bob Clarke Trophy: Ray Ferraro, Brandon Wheat Kings
Most Sportsmanlike Player: Mark Lamb, Medicine Hat Tigers
Top defenseman – Bill Hunter Trophy: Bob Rouse, Lethbridge Broncos
Rookie of the Year – Jim Piggott Memorial Trophy: Cliff Ronning, New Westminster Bruins
Top goaltender – Del Wilson Trophy: Ken Wregget, Lethbridge Broncos
Coach of the Year – Dunc McCallum Memorial Trophy: Terry Simpson, Prince Albert Raiders
Regular-season champions – Scotty Munro Memorial Trophy: Kamloops Junior Oilers

== All-Star teams ==
East Division
| | First Team | | Second team | |
|---|---|---|---|---|
| Goal | Ken Wregget | Lethbridge Broncos | Ron Hextall | Brandon Wheat Kings |
| Defense | Bob Rouse | Lethbridge Broncos | John Miner | Regina Pats |
| Defense | Cam Plante | Brandon Wheat Kings | Emanuel Viveiros | Prince Albert Raiders |
| Center | Ray Ferraro | Brandon Wheat Kings | Dan Hodgson | Prince Albert Raiders |
| Left wing | Mark Lamb | Medicine Hat Tigers | Murray Craven (tied) | Medicine Hat Tigers |
| Left wing | - | - | Doug Trapp (tied) | Regina Pats |
| Right wing | Taylor Hall | Regina Pats | Dave Pasin | Prince Albert Raiders |
West Division
| | First Team | | Second team | |
| Goal | Pokey Reddick | New Westminster Bruins | Daryl Reaugh | Kamloops Junior Oilers |
| Defense | Doug Bodger | Kamloops Junior Oilers | Gord Mark | Kamloops Junior Oilers |
| Defense | Gary Stewart | Seattle Breakers | Eric Thurston | Victoria Cougars |
| Center | Dean Evason | Kamloops Junior Oilers | Cliff Ronning | New Westminster Bruins |
| Left wing | Randy Heath | Portland Winter Hawks | Mike Nottingham (tied) | Kamloops Junior Oilers |
| Left wing | - | - | Jeff Rohlicek (tied) | Portland Winter Hawks |
| Right wing | Alan Kerr | Seattle Breakers | Grant Sasser | Portland Winter Hawks |

== See also ==
- 1984 Memorial Cup
- 1984 NHL entry draft
- 1983 in sports
- 1984 in sports

== Notes ==
| Preceded by 1982–83 WHL season | WHL seasons | Succeeded by 1984–85 WHL season |
