= 40th National Hockey League All-Star Game =

Professional ice hockey exhibition game

40th NHL All-Star Game
	1	2	3	Total
Wales	2	1	2	5
Campbell	2	3	4	9
- Date: February 7, 1989
- Arena: Northlands Coliseum
- City: Edmonton
- MVP: Wayne Gretzky (Los Angeles)
- Attendance: 17,503

The 40th National Hockey League All-Star Game was held at Northlands Coliseum in Edmonton, home to the Edmonton Oilers, on February 7, 1989.

== The return of Wayne Gretzky ==
The previous year saw the then-unthinkable trade of Wayne Gretzky to the Los Angeles Kings, a move that shocked many Canadians, but allowed the NHL to expand into new American markets. As Gretzky was a no-brainer to be a starter due to the fan-balloting process, the game was highly touted as Gretzky's return to Edmonton (despite the Kings having faced the Oilers in Edmonton earlier in the season). To this extent, even Campbell conference coach Glen Sather reserved Gretzky's old stall in the Oilers' dressing room, and he played on the line with then-current linemate Luc Robitaille and former linemate Jari Kurri. Gretzky was warmly welcomed in Edmonton, and for his part, scored a goal and two assists and earning the ceremonial car as the game's MVP (which he promptly gave to friend and former linemate Dave Semenko).

Gretzky himself arrived in Edmonton a week early, with wife Janet and seven-week-old daughter Paulina to test drive two snowmobiles that he had bought before being traded. In comparison, Mario Lemieux, who was perennially being compared to Gretzky, had only a single assist and was a -4 in plus/minus ranking. What was interesting, however, was that Lemieux, who was on pace to shatter Gretzky's record of 215 points, was the star in the previous year's game and would be the star in next year's game.

== Uniforms ==
Following Rendez-Vous '87, the NHL had removed the conference names from its All-Star uniforms for the 1988 All-Star Game. The league made further changes to the uniforms this year, changing the primary color of the dark jersey from orange to black, with the contrasting shoulder and sleeve stripe in white, while the white jersey's shoulders were changed to black, and the separating stripe on both uniforms was widened and changed to orange. Orange stripes were placed above and below the band of stars at the waistline, which was reduced from six stars on each side to five. The stars were also removed from the sleeves, although the All-Star shield and individual game patch continued to be used on the shoulders. The numerals were colored orange with a contrasting outline. The corresponding pants would remain the same, while the stripes on the socks were altered to correspond to the stripe and star patterns on the respective jerseys.

The uniforms would continue to be used through 1993, with the exception of the 1992 game, which featured throwback uniforms.

== Team rosters ==
	Campbell Conference	Wales Conference
Head coach	(Canada) Glen Sather (Edmonton Oilers)	(Canada) Terry O'Reilly (Boston Bruins)
Honorary captain	(Canada) Bruce MacGregor	(Canada) Norm Ullman
Lineup	Starting lineup: (Canada) 4 - D Kevin Lowe (Edmonton Oilers), Alternate; (Finland) 17 - RW Jari Kurri (Edmonton Oilers); (Canada) 22 - LW Luc Robitaille (Los Angeles Kings); (Canada) 28 - D Steve Duchesne (Los Angeles Kings); (Canada) 31 - G Grant Fuhr (Edmonton Oilers); (Canada) 99 - C Wayne Gretzky (Los Angeles Kings), Captain; Reserves: (Canada) (United States) 2 - D Dave Ellett (Winnipeg Jets); (Canada) 3 - D Dave Manson (Chicago Blackhawks); (United States) 7 - RW Joe Mullen (Calgary Flames); (Canada) 9 - C Bernie Nicholls (Los Angeles Kings); (Canada) 10 - RW Gary Leeman (Toronto Maple Leafs); (Canada) 11 - C Mark Messier (Edmonton Oilers, Alternate); (United States) 12 - C Jimmy Carson (Edmonton Oilers); (United States) 16 - RW Brett Hull (St. Louis Blues); (Canada) 19 - C Steve Yzerman (Detroit Red Wings); (Canada) 20 - RW Dino Ciccarelli (Minnesota North Stars); (United States) 21 - D Gary Suter (Calgary Flames); (Canada) 23 - D Paul Reinhart (Vancouver Canucks); (Canada) 25 - C Joe Nieuwendyk (Calgary Flames); (Canada) 30 - G Mike Vernon (Calgary Flames)	Starting lineup: (Canada) 7 - D Paul Coffey (Pittsburgh Penguins); (Canada) 8 - LW Cam Neely (Boston Bruins); (Canada) 30 - G Sean Burke (New Jersey Devils); (Canada) 66 - C Mario Lemieux (Pittsburgh Penguins), Alternate; (Canada) 77 - D Ray Bourque (Boston Bruins), Alternate; (Canada) 44 - RW Rob Brown (Pittsburgh Penguins); Reserves: (Canada) 1 - G Reggie Lemelin (Boston Bruins); (Canada) 3 - D Scott Stevens (Washington Capitals); (United States) 6 - D Phil Housley (Buffalo Sabres); (Canada) 11 - RW Kevin Dineen (Hartford Whalers); (Canada) 14 - RW John MacLean (New Jersey Devils); (Canada) 15 - C Bobby Smith (Montreal Canadiens); (United States) 16 - C Pat LaFontaine (New York Islanders); (Canada) 17 - C Mike Ridley (Washington Capitals); (United States) 18 - LW Brian Mullen (New York Rangers); (Canada) 19 - D Larry Robinson (Montreal Canadiens), Captain; (Canada) 22 - RW Rick Tocchet (Philadelphia Flyers); (Canada) 25 - D Glen Wesley (Boston Bruins); (Canada) 35 - LW Mike McPhee (Montreal Canadiens); (Canada) 75 - C Walt Poddubny (Quebec Nordiques)

== Game summary ==
	Campbell Conference	Wales Conference
Final score	9	5
Scoring summary	Kurri (Gretzky, Robitaille) 1:07 first; Gretzky (Duchesne) 4:33 first; Mullen (Messier, Nieuwendyk) 7:57 second; Yzerman (Duchesne, Ciccarelli) 17:21 second; Leeman (Carson) 17:35 second; Mullen (Manson) 6:53 third (GWG); Robitaille (Kurri, Gretzky) 12:18 third; Carson (Leeman, Hull) 14:35 third; Messier (Nieuwendyk, Mullen) 17:14 third	Neely (Lemieux, Stevens) 9:47 first (PPG); Poddubny (Ridley, Robinson) 10:38 first; Wesley (LaFontaine, Mullen) 3:16 second; Poddubny (Tocchet, Robinson) 4:40 third; Ridley (Bourque, Tocchet) 9:35 third
Penalties	Messier, holding 9:35 first	Bourque, tripping 13:44 first
Shots on goal	14–9–15–38	13–10–14–37
Win/loss	W - Mike Vernon	L - Reggie Lemelin

- Referee: Ron Hoggarth
- Linesmen: Ron Asselstine, Wayne Bonney
- TV: CBC, SRC, SCA

== See also ==
- 1988–89 NHL season

== Notes ==
- Mats Naslund named to Wales team, but did not play
- Denis Savard named to Campbell team, but did not play
- Pre-game entertainment featured a performance by the Ukrainian Shumka Dancers
