= 44th National Hockey League All-Star Game =

Professional ice hockey exhibition game

44th NHL All-Star Game
	1	2	3	Total
Campbell	0	2	4	6
Wales	6	6	4	16
- Date: February 6, 1993
- Arena: Montreal Forum
- City: Montreal
- MVP: Mike Gartner (NY Rangers)
- Attendance: 17,137

The 44th National Hockey League All-Star Game was the last NHL All-Star Game to take place at the Montreal Forum on February 6, 1993. Before the start of the Game, there was a tribute to Mario Lemieux, who was in attendance but could not play due to his treatments for Hodgkin's Disease. The Tampa Bay Lightning sent their first representatives to an All-Star Game. Mike Gartner would take Mark Messier's place in the All-Star lineup and ended up becoming the fourth player in All-Star history to score four goals in one game, earning All-Star MVP honours. The final score was Wales Conference 16, Campbell Conference 6.

== Super Skills Competition ==
The Campbell Conference would win their first Skills Competition since the 1990 Skills Competition after going through a penalty shot tie-breaker. Ray Bourque matched his four hits on four shots in the Accuracy Shooting event, while Mike Gartner established a new record in the Fastest Skater event at 13.510 seconds. Al Iafrate won the Hardest Shot event slapping the puck at 105.2 mph, which held the record as Hardest Shot for 16 years until it was broken in 2009 by Zdeno Chara, who shot 105.4 mph, which he improved to 105.9 mph in 2011 and again to 108.8 mph in 2012.

=== Uniforms ===
Following the use of throwback uniforms in the 1992 All-Star Game, the NHL reverted to the design introduced in 1989, with one change. The numerals were changed from orange on both jerseys to the reverse of the background color - black outlined in orange on white, and white outlined in orange on black. In addition, the Stanley Cup Centennial patch was worn on the upper left chest.

=== Individual event winners ===
- Fastest Skater - Mike Gartner, (New York Rangers) - 13.510 seconds
- Accuracy Shooting - Ray Bourque, (Boston Bruins) - 4 hits, 4 shots
- Hardest Shot - Al Iafrate, (Washington Capitals) - 105.2 mph
- Goaltenders Competition - Jon Casey, (Minnesota North Stars) - 5 GA, 30 shots

== The Game ==
=== Summary ===
	Wales Conference	Campbell Conference
Final score	16	6
Scoring summary	Gartner (Lowe, Oates) 3:15 first; Gartner (Oates) 3:37 first; Bondra (Oates, Gartner) 4:24 first; Mogilny (Bourque) 11:40 first (PPG); Turgeon (Recchi) 13:05 first; Gartner (Oates, Bondra) 13:22 first; Tocchet (K. Stevens, Recchi) 0:19 second (GWG); Gartner (Turgeon) 3:33 second; Tocchet (S. Stevens) 4:57 second; Recchi (Marsh) 9:25 second; K. Stevens (Recchi) 14:50 second; Turgeon (Sakic, Jagr) 17:56 second; LaFontaine (Muller, Mogilny) 8:07 third; Jagr (Sakic, Turgeon) 9:08 third; Marsh (K. Stevens, Recchi) 12:52 third; Turgeon (Sakic, S. Stevens) 15:51 third	Roenick (Selanne) 5:52 second; Kisio (Roenick, Modano) 10:15 second; Gilmour (Coffey) 13:51 third; Selanne (Manson, Kurri) 17:03 third; Bure (Kisio) 18:44 third; Bure (unassisted) 19:31 third
Penalties	none	Manson, tripping 11:12 first
Shots on goal	22–15–12–49	11–16–14–41
Win/loss	W - Peter Sidorkiewicz	L - Mike Vernon

- Referee: Dan Marouelli
- Linesmen: Ryan Bozak, Kevin Collins

== Rosters ==
	Wales Conference	Campbell Conference
Head coach	(Canada) Scotty Bowman (Pittsburgh Penguins)	(Canada) Mike Keenan (Chicago Blackhawks)
Honorary captain	(Canada) Henri Richard	(Canada) Frank Mahovlich
Lineup	Starting Lineup: (Canada) 4 - D Kevin Lowe (New York Rangers), Alternate; (Canada) 22 - RW Rick Tocchet (Pittsburgh Penguins); (United States) 25 - LW Kevin Stevens (Pittsburgh Penguins); (Canada) 33 - G Patrick Roy (Montreal Canadiens); (Czech Republic) 68 - RW Jaromir Jagr (Pittsburgh Penguins); (Canada) 77 - D Ray Bourque (Boston Bruins), Captain; Commissioner's Selection: (Canada) 14 - D Brad Marsh (Ottawa Senators); Reserves: (Canada) 1 - G Craig Billington (New Jersey Devils); (Canada) 3 - D Zarley Zalapski (Hartford Whalers); (Canada) 5 - D Scott Stevens (New Jersey Devils); (Canada) 7 - C Pierre Turgeon (New York Islanders); (Canada) 8 - RW Mark Recchi (Philadelphia Flyers; (Canada) 9 - C Kirk Muller (Montreal Canadiens); (Canada) 11 - RW Mike Gartner (New York Rangers), Alternate; (Canada) 12 - C Adam Oates (Boston Bruins); (United States) 16 - C Pat LaFontaine (Buffalo Sabres); (Slovakia) 18 - LW Peter Bondra (Washington Capitals); (Canada) 19 - C Joe Sakic (Quebec Nordiques); (Canada) 28 - D Steve Duchesne (Quebec Nordiques); (Canada) 31 - G Peter Sidorkiewicz (Ottawa Senators); (United States) 34 - D Al Iafrate (Washington Capitals); (Russia) 89 - LW Alexander Mogilny (Buffalo Sabres)	Starting Lineup: (Canada) 00 - G Ed Belfour (Chicago Blackhawks); (United States) 7 - D Chris Chelios (Chicago Blackhawks), Alternate; (Russia) 12 - LW Pavel Bure (Vancouver Canucks); (United States) 16 - RW Brett Hull (St. Louis Blues); (Canada) 19 - C Steve Yzerman (Detroit Red Wings); (Canada) 77 - D Paul Coffey (Detroit Red Wings), Alternate; Commissioner's Selection: (Canada) 8 - D Randy Carlyle (Winnipeg Jets); Reserves: (Canada) 3 - D Steve Chiasson (Detroit Red Wings); (Canada) 5 - D Garth Butcher (St. Louis Blues); (United States) 6 - D Phil Housley (Winnipeg Jets); (United States) 9 - C Mike Modano (Minnesota North Stars); (Canada) 10 - LW Gary Roberts (Calgary Flames); (Canada) 11 - C Kelly Kisio (San Jose Sharks); (Finland) 13 - RW Teemu Selanne (Winnipeg Jets); (Canada) 14 - C Brian Bradley (Tampa Bay Lightning); (Finland) 17 - RW Jari Kurri (Los Angeles Kings); (Canada) 20 - LW Luc Robitaille (Los Angeles Kings); (Canada) 24 - D Dave Manson (Edmonton Oilers); (United States) 27 - C Jeremy Roenick (Chicago Blackhawks); (Canada) 30 - G Mike Vernon (Calgary Flames); (United States) 35 - G Jon Casey (Minnesota North Stars); (Canada) 93 - C Doug Gilmour (Toronto Maple Leafs); (Canada) 99 - C Wayne Gretzky (Los Angeles Kings), Captain

== See also ==
- 1992–93 NHL season

== Notes ==
- ^+ Casey won in a penalty shot tie-breaker with Mike Vernon and Ed Belfour, each of whom also had 5 GA in the Breakaway Relay and Rapid Fire events.
- ^1 Brian Leetch was voted as a starter, but was not able to play due to injury. His teammate Kevin Lowe was his replacement in the starting lineup.
- ^2 Mario Lemieux was voted as a starter, but was not able to play due to treatments for Hodgkin's Disease. Rick Tocchet was his replacement in the starting lineup.
- ^3 Mark Messier was selected to the All-Star Game, but did not play. Mike Gartner was named as his replacement.
- ^4 Jeff Brown was selected to the All-Star Game, but did not play. Garth Butcher was named as his replacement.

The Game set several All-Star Game records:

Team records:

- Most goals, both teams, one game: 22 (has since been broken)
- Most goals, one team, one game: 16 - Wales Conference
- Most shots, both teams, one game: 90 - Wales 49, Campbell 41 (has since been broken)
- Most shots, one team, one game: 49 - Wales Conference (has since been broken)
- Fastest three goals, both teams: 1:08 - All by Wales Conference - Mike Gartner at 3:15 and 3:37 of the first period, Peter Bondra at 4:23
- Fastest four goals, both teams: 3:40 - Pierre Turgeon (Wales) at 15:51 of the third period, Teemu Selanne (Campbell) at 17:03, Pavel Bure (Campbell) at 18:44 and 19:31 (has since been broken)
- Fastest three goals, one team (See "Fastest three goals, both teams" above)

Individual records:

- Most goals, one game: 4 - Mike Gartner, Wales; Equalled mark set by Wayne Gretzky, Mario Lemieux, and Vincent Damphousse
- Most assists, one period: 4 - Adam Oates, Wales, first period
- Most points, one period: 4 - Mike Gartner, Wales (3G, 1A in first period), Adam Oates, Wales (4A in first period)
