= 35th National Hockey League All-Star Game =

Professional ice hockey exhibition game

35th NHL All-Star Game
| | 1 | 2 | 3 | Total |
|---|---|---|---|---|
| Campbell | 1 | 2 | 6 | 9 |
| Wales | 2 | 0 | 1 | 3 |
- Date: February 8, 1983
- Arena: Nassau Veterans Memorial Coliseum
- City: Uniondale
- MVP: Wayne Gretzky (Edmonton)
- Attendance: 15,230

The 35th National Hockey League All-Star Game was held on February 8, 1983, at the Nassau Veterans Memorial Coliseum in Uniondale, New York, home to the New York Islanders. In the game, Edmonton Oilers' centre Wayne Gretzky set an All-Star Game record by scoring all of his four goals in the third period. Gretzky's four goal performance was instrumental in winning his first All-Star M.V.P. honor. Wayne Gretzky's Edmonton Oilers' linemate Mark Messier assisted on three of the four goals in the third period to set an All-Star Game record for most assists in a period.

== Uniforms ==
Following the overload of stars on the 1982 All-Star uniforms, the NHL opted to simplify the designs for 1983. The number of stars on the jersey were reduced to six on the front and back of the waistline, above a contrasting stripe, and three on each sleeve, below the numbers. The sleeves also featured a contrasting stripe panel running from the collar down to the cuff, similar to the stripe used by the Toronto Maple Leafs at the time. The NHL shield continued to be worn on the right shoulder, while the All-Star shield (introduced in 1981) made its uniform debut here on the left shoulder. The NHL also placed the conference names on the uniform for the first time, with the home Wales Conference team wearing white jerseys with orange trim, and the visiting Campbell team wearing orange jerseys with black trim. The player names and numerals were rendered in a block-shadow font similar to the style used by the New York Rangers.

== Game summary ==
| | Campbell Conference | Wales Conference |
| Final score | 9 | 3 |
| Head coach | (Canada) Roger Neilson (Vancouver Canucks) | (Canada) Al Arbour (New York Islanders) |
|---|---|---|
| Lineup | Starting Lineup: (Canada) 7 - D Paul Coffey (Edmonton Oilers); (Canada) 9 - RW Lanny McDonald (Calgary Flames); (Canada) 20 - LW Al Secord (Chicago Black Hawks); (Canada) 24 - D Doug Wilson (Chicago Black Hawks); (Canada) 30 - G Murray Bannerman (Chicago Black Hawks); (Canada) 99 - C Wayne Gretzky (Edmonton Oilers); Reserves: (Canada) 3 - D Willie Huber (Detroit Red Wings); (Canada) 4 - D Craig Hartsburg (Minnesota North Stars); (Canada) 6 - D Bob Murray (Chicago Black Hawks); (United States) 8 - C Neal Broten (Minnesota North Stars); (Canada) 10 - LW Brian Sutter (St. Louis Blues); (Canada) 11 - LW Mark Messier (Edmonton Oilers); (Canada) 12 - LW Tom McCarthy (Minnesota North Stars); (Canada) 16 - C Marcel Dionne (Los Angeles Kings); (Finland) 17 - LW Jari Kurri (Edmonton Oilers); (Canada) 18 - C Denis Savard (Chicago Black Hawks); (Canada) 19 - RW Dino Ciccarelli (Minnesota North Stars); (Canada) 22 - RW Rick Vaive (Toronto Maple Leafs); (Canada) 31 - G John Garrett (Vancouver Canucks); (Canada) 44 - D Dave Babych (Winnipeg Jets) | Starting Lineup: (Canada) 1 - G Pete Peeters (Boston Bruins); (Canada) 5 - D Denis Potvin (New York Islanders); (United States) 6 - D Rod Langway (Washington Capitals); (Canada) 16 - LW Michel Goulet (Quebec Nordiques); (Czechoslovakia) 18 - RW Marian Stastny (Quebec Nordiques); (Czechoslovakia) 26 - C Peter Stastny (Quebec Nordiques); Reserves: (United States) 2 - D Mark Howe (Philadelphia Flyers); (United States) 4 - D Mike Ramsey (Buffalo Sabres); (Canada) 7 - D Ray Bourque (Boston Bruins); (Canada) 8 - C Ron Francis (Hartford Whalers); (Canada) 10 - C Barry Pederson (Boston Bruins); (Canada) 11 - LW Ryan Walter (Montreal Canadiens); (Canada) 12 - LW Don Maloney (New York Rangers); (Canada) 17 - RW Rick Kehoe (Pittsburgh Penguins); (Canada) 19 - LW Bryan Trottier (New York Islanders); (Canada) 20 - RW Hector Marini (New Jersey Devils); (Canada) 22 - RW Mike Bossy (New York Islanders); (Canada) 27 - C Darryl Sittler (Philadelphia Flyers); (United States) 28 - D Dave Langevin (New York Islanders); (Sweden) 31 - G Pelle Lindbergh (Philadelphia Flyers) |
| Scoring summary | Babych (McDonald, Sutter) 11:37 1st PP; Ciccarelli (Broten, Secord) 3:01 2nd; McCarthy (Ciccarelli, Murray) 14:51 2nd; Gretzky (Kurri, Coffey) 6:20 3rd; McDonald (Sutter, Dionne) 7:29 3rd; Gretzky (Messier, Kurri) 10:31 3rd; Gretzky (Wilson, Messier) 15:32 3rd; Vaive 17:15 3rd; Gretzky (Messier) 19:18 3rd | Goulet (P. Stastny) 3:41 1st; Bourque 19:01 1st; Maloney (Marini) 14:04 3rd |
| Penalties | Sutter (Hooking) 6:26 1st | Langevin (Hooking) 10:58 1st; Ramsey (Holding) 3:33 3rd |
| Shots | 5-12-15 (32) | 10-16-8 (34) |
| Win/loss | W - John Garrett | L - Pelle Lindbergh |

- Referee: Bob Myers
- Linesmen: Ryan Bozak, Leon Stickle
- TV: CBC, SRC, USA Network

== Notes ==
John Garrett was involved in one of the oddest scenarios in the history of the NHL All-Star Game. Replacing an injured Richard Brodeur, the Vancouver Canucks only representative at the 1983 All-Star game that year, John Garrett was voted the game's MVP before the end of the game. After Wayne Gretzky scored four times in the last ten minutes, a re-vote was held and Gretzky was named the All-Star Game MVP.

- ^1 Vancouver goaltender Richard Brodeur was named to the Campbell team, but did not play due to an ear injury. John Garrett took his place.
