= List of NHL career playoff points leaders =

As of completion of the 2026 Stanley Cup playoffs – the 123rd rendition of the postseason tournament for the Stanley Cup as played by teams of the National Hockey League (NHL) – 110 different ice hockey players have scored at least 100 postseason points in their NHL career. Only 413 players have scored 50 points for a postseason career in NHL history.

Wayne Gretzky, the record holder for playoff goals and playoff assists, holds the record for most playoff points for a player in NHL history with 382, having done so in 208 games for an average of 1.837 points per postseason game, which is also a record he holds.

== 100 point playoff scorers ==
Active player, in NHL, is highlighted

(Table updated as of the end of the 2025–26 season)

- Includes statistics from May 24 suspended game in 1988 Stanley Cup Final (EDM at BOS) as well as statistics from 2020 Stanley Cup Qualifiers

Rank	National team	Player	Team(s) (Note: Teams included for a player only for when they recorded a playoff point for that team. For example, Mark Messier played professionally for the Edmonton Oilers, New York Rangers, and the Vancouver Canucks, but as he did not record a playoff point for Vancouver, they are not listed in his category.)	HHOF	GP	G	A	Points	PPG	SHG	Ref.
1	(Canada)	Wayne Gretzky	EDM, LAK, STL, NYR	1999	208	122	260	382	35	12	
2	(Canada)	Mark Messier	EDM, NYR	2007	236	109	186	295	24	14	
3	(Finland)	Jari Kurri	EDM, LAK, NYR, ANA, COL	2001	200	106	127	233	25	10	
4	(Canada)	Glenn Anderson	EDM, TOR, NYR, STL	2008	225	93	121	214	22	1	
5	(Canada)	Sidney Crosby	PIT	Still active	186	72	134	206	22	0	
6	(Czech Republic)	Jaromir Jagr	PIT, WSH, NYR, PHI, BOS, FLA	Still active (ELH)	208	78	123	201	24	2	
7	(Canada)	Paul Coffey	EDM, PIT, LAK, DET, PHI, CAR	2004	194	59	137	196	21	6	
8	(Canada) (United States)	Brett Hull	CGY, STL, DAL, DET	2009	202	103	87	190	38	4	
9	(Canada)	Joe Sakic	QUE, COL	2012	172	84	104	188	27	4	
10	(Canada)	Doug Gilmour	STL, CGY, TOR, NJD, BUF, MTL	2011	182	60	128	188	20	2	
11	(Canada)	Steve Yzerman	DET	2009	196	70	115	185	27	3	
12	(Russia)	Evgeni Malkin	PIT	Still active	183	69	114	183	29	1	
13	(Sweden)	Nicklas Lidström	DET	2015	263	54	129	183	30	3	
14	(Canada)	Bryan Trottier	NYI, PIT	1997	221	71	111	182	18	4	
15	(Canada)	Ray Bourque	BOS, COL	2004	214	41	139	180	15	0	
16	(Russia)	Nikita Kucherov	TBL	Still active	159	54	123	177	19	0	
17	(Canada)	Jean Beliveau	MTL	1972	162	79	97	176	26	0	
18	(Russia)	Sergei Fedorov	DET, WSH	2015	183	52	124	176	15	5	
19	(Canada)	Denis Savard	CHI, MTL	2000	169	66	109	175	24	2	
20	(Canada)	Mario Lemieux	PIT	1997	107	76	96	172	29	7	
21	(Sweden)	Peter Forsberg	QUE, COL, PHI, NSH	2014	151	64	107	171	16	2	
22	(Canada)	Denis Potvin	NYI	1991	185	56	109	165	28	2	
23	(Canada)	Mike Bossy	NYI	1991	129	85	75	160	35	0	
24	(Canada)	Gordie Howe	DET, HFD	1972	157	68	92	160	15	4	
25	(Canada)	Bobby Smith	MNS, MTL	—	184	64	96	160	24	0	
26	(Canada)	Al MacInnis	CGY, STL	2007	177	39	121	160	26	0	
27	(Canada)	Claude Lemieux	MTL, NJD, COL, PHX, DAL, SJS	—	234	80	78	158	21	0	
28	(Canada)	Brad Marchand	BOS, FLA	Still active	180	66	92	158	18	3	
29	(Canada)	Connor McDavid	EDM	Still active	102	45	111	156	14	2	
30	(Canada)	Adam Oates	DET, STL, BOS, WSH, PHI, ANA	2012	163	42	114	156	17	2	
31	(Canada)	Larry Murphy	LAK, WSH, MNS, PIT, TOR, DET	2004	215	37	115	152	20	3	
32	(Germany)	Leon Draisaitl	EDM	Still active	102	55	96	151	23	1	
33	(Canada) (Slovakia)	Stan Mikita	CHI	1983	155	59	91	150	18	2	
34	(Slovakia)	Marian Hossa	OTT, ATL, PIT, DET, CHI	2020	205	52	97	149	18	3	
35	(Canada)	Brian Propp	PHI, BOS, MNS	—	160	64	84	148	27	3	
36	(Russia)	Alexander Ovechkin	WSH	Still active	161	77	70	147	31	0	
37	(Canada)	Mark Recchi	PIT, MTL, PHI, CAR, BOS	2017	189	61	86	147	22	0	
38	(United States)	Mike Modano	MNS, DAL, DET	2014	176	58	88	146	24	2	
39	(United States)	Chris Chelios	MTL, CHI, DET	2013	266	31	113	144	14	3	
40	(Canada)	Larry Robinson	MTL, LAK	1995	227	28	116	144	7	0	
41	(United States)	Joe Pavelski	SJS, DAL	Eligible 2027	201	74	69	143	30	0	
42	(Canada)	Ron Francis	HFD, PIT, CAR, TOR	2007	171	46	97	143	15	0	
43	(Canada)	Corey Perry	ANA, DAL, MTL, TBL, EDM	Still active	237	64	77	141	24	1	
44	(Canada)	Nathan MacKinnon	COL	Still active	108	62	78	140	20	0	
45	(Canada)	Jacques Lemaire	MTL	1984	145	61	78	139	19	1	
46	(United States)	Patrick Kane	CHI, NYR	Still active	143	53	85	138	8	1	
47	(Canada)	Phil Esposito	CHI, BOS, NYR	1984	130	61	76	137	22	0	
48	(Canada)	Brendan Shanahan	NJD, STL, DET, NYR	2013	184	60	74	134	19	1	
49	(Canada)	Guy Lafleur	MTL, NYR	1988	128	58	76	134	15	0	
50	(Canada)	Joe Thornton	BOS, SJS, TOR, FLA	2025	187	32	102	134	11	0	
51	(Finland)	Esa Tikkanen	EDM, NYR, STL, VAN, WSH	—	186	72	60	132	19	3	
52	(Canada)	Steve Larmer	CHI, NYR	—	140	56	75	131	21	3	
53	(Finland)	Mikko Rantanen	COL, DAL	Still active	105	44	86	130	14	0	
54	(Canada)	Bobby Hull	CHI, HFD	1983	119	62	67	129	24	2	
55	(Canada)	Henri Richard	MTL	1979	180	49	80	129	6	0	
56	(Canada)	Patrice Bergeron	BOS	Eligible 2026	170	50	78	128	17	3	
57	(Czech Republic)	David Krejčí	BOS	—	160	43	85	128	13	0	
58	(Canada)	Patrick Marleau	SJS, TOR, PIT	—	195	72	55	127	24	4	
59	(Canada)	Yvan Cournoyer	MTL	1982	147	64	63	127	20	0	
60	(Canada)	Luc Robitaille	LAK, PIT, NYR, DET	2009	159	58	69	127	15	0	
61	(Canada)	Maurice Richard	MTL	1961	132	82	44	126	16	0	
62	(Czech Republic)	Patrik Eliáš	NJD	—	162	45	80	125	21	2	
63	(Canada)	Brad Park	NYR, BOS, DET	1988	161	35	90	125	13	1	
64	(United States)	Jeremy Roenick	CHI, PHX, PHI, SJS	2024	154	53	69	122	17	2	
65	(Canada)	Brian Bellows	MNS, MTL, TBL, ANA, WSH	—	143	51	71	122	23	2	
66	(Canada)	Chris Pronger	STL, EDM, ANA, PHI	2015	173	26	95	121	13	0	
67	(Sweden)	Henrik Zetterberg	DET	—	137	57	63	120	21	2	
68	(Canada)	Ken Linseman	PHI, EDM, BOS	—	113	43	77	120	9	2	
69	(Canada)	Ryan Getzlaf	ANA	—	125	37	83	120	15	2	
70	(Sweden)	Victor Hedman	TBL	Still active	170	23	97	120	10	0	
71	(Canada)	Jonathan Toews	CHI	Eligible 2029	137	45	74	119	19	3	
72	(Canada)	Bobby Clarke	PHI	1987	136	42	77	119	15	3	
73	(Canada)	Dino Ciccarelli	MNS, WSH, DET	2010	141	73	45	118	34	0	
74	(Canada)	Bernie Geoffrion	MTL, NYR	1972	132	58	60	118	20	0	
75	(Canada)	Frank Mahovlich	TOR, DET, MTL	1981	137	51	67	118	12	1	
76	(Canada)	Dale Hunter	QUE, WSH, COL	—	186	42	76	118	13	2	
77	(Canada)	Scott Stevens	WSH, STL, NJD	2007	233	26	92	118	12	0	
78	(Russia)	Sergei Zubov	NYR, PIT, DAL	2019	164	24	93	117	13	1	
79	(Canada)	Joe Nieuwendyk	CGY, DAL, NJD, TOR	2011	158	66	50	116	23	0	
80	(Canada)	Daniel Brière	PHX, BUF, PHI, MTL	—	124	53	63	116	21	0	
81	(Canada)	John Tonelli	NYI, CGY, LAK	—	172	40	75	115	5	0	
82	(Canada)	Bernie Nicholls	LAK, NYR, EDM, NJD, CHI, SJS	—	118	42	72	114	16	1	
83	(Sweden)	Nicklas Bäckström	WSH	Still active (SHL)	139	38	76	114	10	0	
84	(Russia)	Pavel Datsyuk	DET	2024	157	42	71	113	15	0	
85	(Canada)	Rick Tocchet	PHI, PIT, BOS, PHX	—	145	52	60	112	16	1	
86	(Canada)	Rod Brind'Amour	STL, PHI, CAR	—	159	51	60	111	17	4	
87	(Canada)	Dickie Moore	MTL, TOR, STL	1974	135	46	64	110	18	0	
88	(United States)	Craig Janney	BOS, STL, SJS, WIN, PHX	—	120	24	86	110	10	0	
89	(Canada)	Geoff Courtnall	BOS, EDM, WSH, VAN, STL	—	156	39	70	109	12	2	
90	(Canada)	Bill Barber	PHI	1990	129	53	55	108	9	5	
91	(Canada)	Rick MacLeish	PHI, PIT, DET	—	114	54	53	107	21	0	
92	(Canada)	Steve Thomas	TOR, CHI, NYI, NJD, ANA, DET	—	174	54	53	107	16	0	
93	(United States)	Joe Mullen	STL, CGY, PIT	2000	143	60	46	106	14	2	
94	(United States)	Kevin Stevens	PIT	—	103	46	60	106	20	0	
95	(Canada)	Brad Richards	TBL, DAL, NYR, CHI, DET	—	146	37	68	105	15	0	
96	(Czechoslovakia) (Slovakia) (Canada)	Peter Stastny	QUE, NJD, STL	1998	93	33	72	105	13	1	
97	(Canada)	Vincent Damphousse	TOR, EDM, MTL, SJS	—	140	41	63	104	13	4	
98	(Canada)	Alex Delvecchio	DET	1977	121	35	69	104	13	0	
99	(Czech Republic)	Ondřej Palát	TBL, NJD	Still active	155	51	52	103	11	1	
100	(Canada)	Johnny Bucyk	DET, BOS	1981	124	41	62	103	16	0	
101	(Canada)	Gilbert Perreault	BUF	1990	90	33	70	103	10	0	
102	(Canada)	Justin Williams	PHI, CAR, LAK, WSH	—	162	41	61	102	6	1	
103	(Canada)	Steven Stamkos	TBL	Still active	128	50	51	101	20	0	
104	(Canada)	Logan Couture	SJS	—	116	48	53	101	16	1	
105	(Canada)	Bernie Federko	STL	2002	91	35	66	101	13	0	
106	(United States)	Scott Gomez	NJD, NYR, MTL, SJS	—	149	29	72	101	7	0	
107	(Sweden)	Daniel Alfredsson	OTT, DET	2022	124	51	49	100	25	3	
108	(Canada)	Rick Middleton	NYR, BOS	—	114	45	55	100	9	3	
109	(Russia)	Alexei Kovalev	NYR, PIT, MTL	—	123	45	55	100	10	1	
110	(United States)	Brian Rafalski	NJD, DET	—	165	29	71	100	17	0	

== Point average leaders ==
As of the 2026 Stanley Cup playoffs, 41 players have averaged a point per playoff game.

Active player, in NHL, is highlighted
Player inducted into HHOF is highlighted

Minimum: 50 points

Rank	Player	Postseason tenure	PTS/G
1	Wayne Gretzky	1979–1999	1.837
2	Mario Lemieux	1984–2006	1.607
3	Barry Pederson	1980–1992	1.529
4	Connor McDavid	2015–2026	1.529
5	Leon Draisaitl	2014–2026	1.480
6	Nathan MacKinnon	2013–2026	1.296
7	Mark Messier	1979–2004	1.250
8	Bobby Orr	1966–1979	1.243
9	Mike Bossy	1977–1987	1.240
10	Mikko Rantanen	2015–2026	1.238
11	Jari Kurri	1980–1998	1.165
12	Gilbert Perreault	1970–1987	1.144
13	Peter Forsberg	1994–2011	1.132
14	Peter Šťastný	1980–1995	1.129
15	Nikita Kucherov	2013–2026	1.113
16	Bernie Federko	1976–1090	1.110
17	Sidney Crosby	2005–2026	1.108
18	Pavel Bure	1991–2003	1.094
19	Joe Sakic	1988–2009	1.093
20	Jean Béliveau	1950–1971	1.086
21	Evan Bouchard	2018–2026	1.086
22	Bobby Hull	1957–1980	1.084
23	Eric Lindros	1992–2007	1.075
24	Toe Blake	1934–1948	1.069
25	Ken Linseman	1978–1992	1.062
26	Phil Esposito	1963–1981	1.054
27	Jack Eichel	2015–2026	1.048
28	Guy Lafleur	1971–1991	1.047
29	Denis Savard	1980–1997	1.036
30	Doug Gilmour	1983–2003	1.033
31	Kevin Stevens	1987–2002	1.029
32	Theoren Fleury	1988–2003	1.026
33	Brian Leetch	1987–2006	1.021
34	Dale Hawerchuk	1981–1997	1.021
35	Gordie Howe	1946–1980	1.019
36	Craig Simpson	1985–1995	1.015
37	Paul Coffey	1980–2001	1.010
38	Evgeni Malkin	2006–2026	1.000
39	Jake Guentzel	2016–2026	1.000
40	Mitch Marner	2016–2026	1.000
41	Cale Makar	2019–2026	1.000
