= Gary Suter =

American ice hockey player (born 1964)

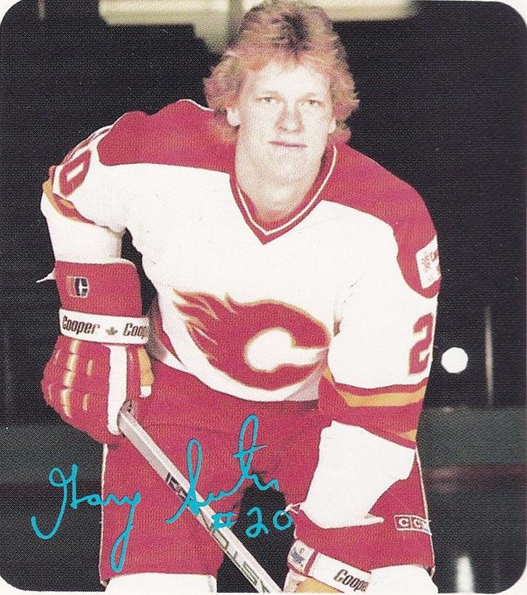
- Suter with the Calgary Flames in 1986
- Born: June 24, 1964 (age 62) Madison, Wisconsin, U.S.
- Height: 6 ft 0 in (183 cm)
- Weight: 205 lb (93 kg; 14 st 9 lb)
- Position: Defense
- Shot: Left
- Played for: Calgary Flames; Chicago Blackhawks; San Jose Sharks
- National team: United States
- NHL draft: 180th overall, 1984; Calgary Flames
- Playing career: 1985–2002

Gary Lee Suter (born June 24, 1964) is an American former professional ice hockey player. As a defenseman, he played over 1,000 games in the National Hockey League (NHL) between 1985 and 2002. He was a ninth round selection of the Calgary Flames, 180th overall, at the 1984 NHL entry draft and played with Calgary for nine years. He won the Calder Memorial Trophy as the NHL's top rookie in 1986, played in four All-Star Games and was a member of Calgary's Stanley Cup championship team in 1989. He was traded to the Chicago Blackhawks in 1994, then to the San Jose Sharks in 1998, with whom he finished his career.

Suter represented the United States internationally on numerous occasions. He appeared in two World Championships and two Canada Cup tournaments. He was a member of the American team that won the inaugural World Cup of Hockey in 1996 and was a two-time Olympian, winning a silver medal in 2002. Suter is an honored member of the United States Hockey Hall of Fame, inducted in 2011.

== Early life ==
Suter was born on June 24, 1964, in Madison, Wisconsin. He is the youngest of five children, all of whom were heavily involved in sports. Gary followed his three elder brothers, John, Bob and Steve into hockey, while his sister was a figure skater. Their father Marlow was a senior player in the 1950s, and helped found and coach the Madison Capitols minor hockey system that all four boys played with in their youth. Gary idolized his brother Bob, who was a member of the American "Miracle on Ice" team that won the gold medal at the 1980 Winter Olympics.

After playing his junior and senior seasons of high school hockey with the Culver Military Academy, Suter joined the Dubuque Fighting Saints program in the United States Hockey League (USHL). He appeared in 18 games with the Fighting Saints in the 1981–82 season, scoring 3 goals and 7 points. He was eligible for the 1982 NHL entry draft, but listed at five feet, nine inches tall by the Central Scouting Bureau, was considered too small for the NHL and went undrafted. Suter established himself as one of the first star players in the USHL's junior era, improving to 39 points in 41 games in 1982–83 and leading Dubuque to the Clark Cup championship. The team's captain, he also led Dubuque to a national junior championship. He was again passed over by the NHL in the 1983 Draft, but accepted a full scholarship to play at the University of Wisconsin–Madison.

Suter was the third member of his family to play defense for the Wisconsin Badgers, following brothers John and Bob. He appeared in 34 games in 1983–84, scoring 22 points. Ian McKenzie, coordinator of scouting for the Calgary Flames, noticed Suter's play at Wisconsin and that he had added over two inches of height, which Central Scouting had failed to update in its record on him. The Flames picked Suter with their ninth round selection, 180th overall, in the 1984 Draft. Suter, who had been working in a beer factory, was initially disappointed at his selection. He was in his last year of draft eligibility and was hoping to follow other college players who signed lucrative contracts as free agents after going unselected. Following his sophomore season of 1984–85, in which he recorded 51 points in 39 games for Wisconsin, Suter left Wisconsin to turn professional.

== Playing career ==
=== Calgary Flames ===
The departure of Kari Eloranta prior to the 1985–86 NHL season created an opening on the Flames' defense. Suter excelled in training camp and not only earned a spot on the team, he was quickly recognized by head coach Bob Johnson as the team's best overall defenseman. He scored his first two goals in his second NHL game, a 9–2 victory over the Los Angeles Kings, and by mid-season was among the NHL's rookie scoring leaders. He was one of two first-year players (along with Wendel Clark) to play in the 1986 All-Star Game, while his offensive production and ability to play in all situations made him a top contender for the Calder Memorial Trophy. Suter finished the season with 18 goals, and his 68 points tied Al MacInnis for the team lead for scoring among defensemen. He added ten points in ten playoff games, but was knocked out of the post-season in the Smythe Division Final against the Edmonton Oilers after suffering stretched knee ligaments following a hit by Mark Messier. Suter watched as the Flames reached, and ultimately lost, the 1986 Stanley Cup Final to the Montreal Canadiens. Following the season, he was named to the All-Rookie Team on defense and was voted the winner of the Calder Trophy. Suter was the third American-born player to win the award, given to the NHL's top rookie.

The knee injury hampered Suter throughout much of the 1986–87 season; he attempted to play through it, but ultimately missed 12 games. Nonetheless, he still scored 49 points in 68 games played. Healthy for 1987–88, he tallied 70 assists and 91 points which were the highest single season totals he would record in his career. He played in his second All-Star Game, was named a second team All-Star and was a finalist for the James Norris Memorial Trophy as the NHL's top defenseman. Suter appeared in his third All-Star Game in 1988–89, but missed 16 games after undergoing an emergency appendectomy. He had 62 points in 63 games. As had happened in 1986, Suter was injured in the early stages of a deep post-season run by the Flames. He missed most of the 1989 Stanley Cup playoffs after suffering a broken jaw in Calgary's opening round series against the Vancouver Canucks. He watched as the team won the Stanley Cup in six games over Montreal.

Suter reached the 70-point mark in the next two seasons, finishing with 76 in 1989–90 and 70 in 1990–91. His latter campaign earned him his fourth All-Star Game appearance. Suter also played much of the season while awaiting trial after he was arrested following a June 1990 scuffle with police as they tried to arrest fellow NHL player Chris Chelios. The issue was resolved in February 1991 when he agreed to a plea bargain on reduced charges and paid an $8,250 fine. A knee injury caused Suter to miss ten games in 1991–92, but he reached two milestones during the season. He scored his 100th career goal on February 25, 1992, against the Buffalo Sabres, and played in his 500th game on March 12 against the Philadelphia Flyers.

A career-high 23 goals led Suter's 81-point campaign in 1992–93, but he again struggled with a pair of knee injuries that caused him to miss three months of the 1993–94 season and limited him to 25 games for the Flames. His tenure with Calgary ended on March 10, 1994, when the team included him in a six-player trade. The Flames sent Suter (along with Paul Ranheim and Ted Drury) to the Hartford Whalers in exchange for James Patrick, Zarley Zalapski and Michael Nylander. The move surprised Suter: "Calgary's meant a great deal to me. You always hear how trades are part of the game and that you don't have any control over them. When it happens, it's a shock. It just blows me away."

=== Chicago Blackhawks ===
Suter's tenure with the Whalers lasted only one day, as Hartford immediately traded him to the Chicago Blackhawks (along with Randy Cunneyworth and a draft pick) in exchange for František Kučera and Jocelyn Lemieux. Suter appeared in 16 regular season games with the Blackhawks, finishing the season with 41 games played and 18 points combined between Calgary and Chicago. He quickly established a place alongside Chris Chelios as the team's top defensive pair. In his first full season in Chicago, Suter was looked upon to serve as a team leader and played a key role with the team's power play. He appeared in all 48 games of the lockout-shortened 1994–95 season, scoring 37 points, but missed several playoff games after suffering a broken hand against the Vancouver Canucks.

With 67 points in 1995–96, Suter was named to an All-Star team for the fifth time, but a knee injury prevented him from participating in the contest. The 1996–97 season was one of frustration for Suter, as he battled a season-long slump that saw him go 26 games without scoring goal at one point early in the season, then 21 games without a point late. He finished with 28 points, compared to an average of 69 in his previous nine campaigns.

In the final year of his contract with Chicago, Suter improved to 42 points in 1997–98. Prior to the Olympic break, Suter received a four-game suspension for cross-checking the Anaheim Mighty Ducks' Paul Kariya, as Kariya celebrated a goal. While Kariya was initially expected to recover in time for the Olympics, the injury (his fourth concussion in three years) ultimately sidelined him from the competition, as well as the remaining three months of NHL play. Following Suter's return from suspension, NHL Senior Vice President Brian Burke was reported by Ducks head coach Pierre Pagé to have said he would have given Suter a longer ban if the extent of Kariya's injuries were immediately known.

When attempts to negotiate a new deal during the season failed, the team publicly shopped Suter's playing rights around the NHL late in the season but failed to complete a trade. Chicago's best contract offer was a two-year proposal that would have paid Suter $1.85 million per season. Unable to reach terms following the season, the Blackhawks quietly traded his negotiating rights to the San Jose Sharks in exchange for a ninth-round pick a few days before he would have become an unrestricted free agent. He subsequently signed a three-year, $10 million contract with San Jose.

=== San Jose Sharks ===
Suter played only one game for the Sharks in the 1998–99 season, missing virtually the entire campaign after a microbe in his triceps caused an infection that required three surgeries to alleviate. During treatment, doctors also discovered a hole in his heart that required another surgery to correct. At age 35, Suter said he never contemplated retirement due to the ailments as he wanted to repay the Sharks for their support of him. He agreed to defer a portion of his salary that year to allow San Jose to sign a replacement player. Suter returned for the 1999–2000 season healthy and played over 20 minutes per game as San Jose's most experienced defenseman.

Reaching a career milestone, Suter played in his 1,000th NHL game on October 25, 2000, scoring a goal in a 3–1 victory over the Columbus Blue Jackets. He said the achievement meant a lot to him given both the ailments he overcame and that he was dismissed by critics as unlikely to play in the NHL when he was drafted in 1984. Suter finished the regular season with 34 points, but missed nearly the entire playoffs after suffering a concussion in the Sharks' first playoff game.

Signing a new one-year contract, Suter returned to San Jose for a final season in 2001–02 in which he scored 33 points, including his 200th career goal, against the Philadelphia Flyers on January 2, 2002. He announced his retirement as a player following the season.

=== International ===
Suter made his international debut with the American national junior team at the 1984 World Junior Ice Hockey Championships where he recorded a goal and an assist in seven games. He was playing college hockey with Wisconsin when he made his debut with the senior team at the 1985 World Championship. One of his team's top players in the tournament, he was named co-MVP of Team USA. Suter played in a second World Championship in 1992.

Suter's international career was marred by three controversial incidents. The first came during the 1987 Canada Cup, when he was the target of international criticism following a violent confrontation with Andrei Lomakin in a game against the Soviet Union. Following a physical battle, Lomakin speared Suter in the neck, and Suter retaliated with a "baseball swing" that broke his stick across Lomakin's face, causing a gash that required 20 stitches to close. Suter was given a six-game suspension from international competition by the International Ice Hockey Federation (IIHF), while the NHL assessed a four-game ban of its own.

Suter was again vilified during the 1991 Canada Cup, after he knocked Canada's Wayne Gretzky out of the tournament with a check into the boards from behind in the first game of the best-of-three final. Gretzky forgave Suter for the hit, noting he was usually a clean player. In the second game, Suter was responsible for two turnovers that led to goals, including what proved to be the championship-winning marker in a 4–2 victory for Canada.

Suter would avenge this loss five years later, as he was a member of the American team that defeated Canada to win the inaugural World Cup of Hockey (which succeeded the Canada Cup) in 1996.

The third incident occurred during an NHL game shortly before the 1998 Winter Olympics, the first Olympics where the NHL took a break to allow its players to participate, while Suter was a member of the Chicago Blackhawks. In a game against the Mighty Ducks of Anaheim, he cross-checked star Anaheim forward Paul Kariya in the head as Kariya celebrated a goal. The hit gave Kariya a concussion and prevented him from participating in the Olympic tournament, whom he had just been named to Team Canada as their youngest player. There was wide speculation in the media that Suter's hit was an intentional effort by Team USA to keep Kariya from playing for Canada at the Olympics; Canada general manager Bobby Clarke called the hit a "cheap shot" and publicly echoed the sentiment that Suter wanted to eliminate Kariya from Olympic play. The NHL gave Suter a four-game suspension that carried through the Olympic tournament, but the IIHF allowed him to play, a decision that incensed Canadian officials and resulted in Suter receiving a death threat from an angry Canadian fan. Many Japanese fans were disappointed having been eager to see Kariya play in the Olympics due to his Japanese-Canadian ancestry; Team USA's status as the villains during the Olympic tournament was cemented by some American players vandalizing their rooms in the Olympic village after their 4-1 elimination in the quarterfinals to the Czech Republic. While Kariya was initially expected to recover in time for the Olympics, the injury (his fourth concussion in three years) ultimately sidelined him from the competition, as well as the remaining three months of NHL play. Following Suter's return from suspension, NHL Senior Vice President Brian Burke was reported by Ducks head coach Pierre Pagé to have said he would have given Suter a longer ban if the extent of Kariya's injuries were immediately known. Later in the season, prior to a game between the Blackhawks and Maple Leafs in April 1998, Suter received a death threat, presumably for his actions against Kariya, forcing the NHL to position added security at the Blackhawks bench for the contest.

At age 38 and in the final season of his playing career, Suter appeared in his second Olympics, playing in the 2002 tournament in Salt Lake City. He recorded one assist in six games, as the Americans made it to gold medal game where they loss 5-2 to the Canadians (including Paul Kariya). Suter's silver medal came 22 years after his brother Bob's gold in 1980. In recognition of his career and achievements, Suter was inducted into the United States Hockey Hall of Fame in 2011.

== Off the ice ==
Suter returned to Wisconsin following his playing career, settling in the rural community of Minocqua where he and his wife Cathy raised their family. They have two sons, Jake and Jared, both of whom also play hockey. Jake was a defenseman for the UMass Lowell River Hawks. In addition to his sons, several of Suter's nephews are also defensemen. Among them is Bob's son Ryan, who also plays in the NHL and is an Olympian, and whom Gary considered unretiring to play with when the younger Suter was drafted by the Nashville Predators in 2003. Instead, he turned to coaching, working with the Madison Capitols program, as well as assisting with the Lakeland Union High School T-Birds in Minocqua. Gary is one of several members of the Suter family who operate a youth hockey camp in Madison that was held for the 17th year in 2012.

== Career statistics ==
=== Regular season and playoffs ===
			Regular season					Playoffs
Season	Team	League	GP	G	A	Pts	PIM	GP	G	A	Pts	PIM
1981–82	Dubuque Fighting Saints	USHL	18	3	4	7	32	—	—	—	—	—
1982–83	Dubuque Fighting Saints	USHL	41	9	30	39	112	—	—	—	—	—
1983–84	University of Wisconsin	WCHA	35	4	18	22	32	—	—	—	—	—
1984–85	University of Wisconsin	WCHA	39	12	39	51	110	—	—	—	—	—
1985–86	Calgary Flames	NHL	80	18	50	68	141	10	2	8	10	8
1986–87	Calgary Flames	NHL	68	9	39	48	70	6	0	3	3	10
1987–88	Calgary Flames	NHL	75	21	70	91	124	9	1	9	10	6
1988–89	Calgary Flames	NHL	63	13	49	62	78	5	0	3	3	10
1989–90	Calgary Flames	NHL	76	16	60	76	97	6	0	1	1	14
1990–91	Calgary Flames	NHL	79	12	58	70	102	7	1	6	7	12
1991–92	Calgary Flames	NHL	70	12	43	55	128	—	—	—	—	—
1992–93	Calgary Flames	NHL	81	23	58	81	112	6	2	3	5	8
1993–94	Calgary Flames	NHL	25	4	9	13	20	—	—	—	—	—
1993–94	Chicago Blackhawks	NHL	16	2	3	5	18	6	3	2	5	6
1994–95	Chicago Blackhawks	NHL	48	10	27	37	42	12	2	5	7	10
1995–96	Chicago Blackhawks	NHL	82	20	47	67	80	10	3	3	6	8
1996–97	Chicago Blackhawks	NHL	82	7	21	28	70	6	1	4	5	8
1997–98	Chicago Blackhawks	NHL	73	14	28	42	74	—	—	—	—	—
1998–99	San Jose Sharks	NHL	1	0	0	0	0	—	—	—	—	—
1999–00	San Jose Sharks	NHL	76	6	28	34	52	12	2	5	7	12
2000–01	San Jose Sharks	NHL	68	10	24	34	84	1	0	0	0	0
2001–02	San Jose Sharks	NHL	82	6	27	33	57	12	0	4	4	8
NHL totals			1,145	203	641	844	1,349	108	17	56	73	120

=== International ===
Year	Team	Comp	GP	G	A	Pts	PIM
1984	United States	WJC	7	1	1	2	12
1985	United States	WC	10	1	2	3	22
1987	United States	CC	5	0	3	3	9
1991	United States	CC	8	1	3	4	4
1992	United States	WC	6	0	1	1	6
1996	United States	WCH	6	0	2	2	6
1998	United States	Oly	4	0	0	0	2
2002	United States	Oly	6	0	1	1	4
Junior totals			7	1	1	2	12
Senior totals			45	2	12	14	53

== Awards and honors ==
Medal record

Men's ice hockey

Representing the United States

Olympic Games
Silver medal – second place	2002 Salt Lake City	Team competition

Award	Year
National Hockey League
Calder Memorial Trophy; Rookie of the year	1985–86
NHL All-Rookie Team	1985–86
5× NHL All-Star Game selection	1986, 1988; 1989, 1991; 1996
Second team All-Star	1987–88
Stanley Cup champion	1988–89

Preceded by Mario Lemieux	Winner of the Calder Trophy; 1986	Succeeded by Luc Robitaille
