= Dave Toycen =

World Vision Canada president and CEO

Dave Toycen CM OOnt
- Born: March 28, 1947 (age 78); Eau Claire, Wisconsin

David (Dave) Laverne Toycen, CM OOnt (born March 28, 1947) was president and chief executive officer of World Vision Canada who was involved with World Vision for over forty years.

He was made a member of the Order of Ontario in 2010. He is one of the 2016 inductees into Legends Row: Mississauga Walk of Fame.
