= Legends Row: Mississauga Walk of Fame =

Legends Row: Mississauga Walk of Fame is the City of Mississauga's walk of fame.

== Inductees ==
- Billy Talent, inducted in 2015
- Johnny Bower, inducted in 2013
- Don Cherry, inducted in 2014
- Gary Clipperton, inducted in 2017
- Paul Coffey, inducted in 2016
- Chuck Ealey, inducted in 2015
- Orey Fidani (1929 — 2000), inducted in 2016
- Robert Gillespie, inducted in 2015
- Sandy Hawley, inducted in 2014
- Paul Henderson, inducted in 2013
- George Hunter (1921–2013), inducted in 2014
- Tommy Hunter, inducted in 2013
- Dr. Ruth Hussey (1915—1984), inducted in 2017
- Chuck Jackson, inducted in 2013
- Iggy Kaneff, inducted in 2015
- Elliott Kerr, inducted in 2014
- Silken Laumann, inducted in 2013
- Ron Lenyk (1947 - 2015), inducted in 2015
- Hazel McCallion, inducted in 2017
- Bruce McLaughlin (1926–2012), inducted in 2013
- Wilson McTavish, inducted in 2017
- Laurie Pallett, inducted in 2014
- Lata Pata, inducted in 2013
- Oscar Peterson (1925 - 2007), inducted in 2013
- Fran Rider, inducted in 2015
- Dr. Colin Saldanha, inducted in 2016
- Robert J. Sawyer, inducted in 2017
- Harold G. Shipp (1926–2014), inducted in 2014
- George Stroumboulopoulos, inducted in 2015
- Dave Toycen, inducted in 2016
- Triumph, inducted in 2013
- John Tuzo Wilson (1908 — 1993), inducted in 2016
- Dr. Joseph Wong (1954 - 2014), inducted in 2013
- John Wood (1950—2013), inducted in 2017
