= Paul Coffey =

Canadian ice hockey player (born 1961)

- Hockey Hall of Fame, 2004
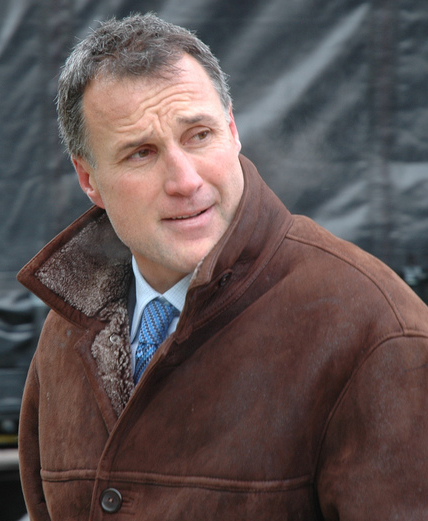
- Coffey in 2007
- Born: June 1, 1961 (age 65) Weston, Ontario, Canada
- Height: 6 ft 0 in (183 cm)
- Weight: 205 lb (93 kg; 14 st 9 lb)
- Position: Defence
- Shot: Left
- Played for: Edmonton Oilers; Pittsburgh Penguins; Los Angeles Kings; Detroit Red Wings; Hartford Whalers; Philadelphia Flyers; Chicago Blackhawks; Carolina Hurricanes; Boston Bruins
- National team: Canada
- NHL draft: 6th overall, 1980; Edmonton Oilers
- Playing career: 1980–2001
- Website: paulcoffey.ca

Paul Patrick Coffey (born June 1, 1961) is a Canadian former professional ice hockey defenceman who played for nine teams over 21 seasons in the National Hockey League (NHL) from 1980 to 2000. Coffey ranks second all-time among NHL defencemen in goals, assists, and points, behind only Ray Bourque. He won the James Norris Memorial Trophy as the NHL's best defenceman three times and was voted to eight end-of-season All-Star teams (four first-team and four second-team). He holds the record for the most goals by a defenceman in one season, 48 in 1985–86, and is the only defenceman to have scored 40 goals more than once, also doing it in 1983–84. He is also one of two defencemen to score 100 points in a season more than once, as he did it five times; Bobby Orr did it six times. Coffey holds or shares 33 NHL records in the regular season and playoffs.

During his NHL career, he played for the Edmonton Oilers, Pittsburgh Penguins, Los Angeles Kings, Detroit Red Wings, Hartford Whalers, Philadelphia Flyers, Carolina Hurricanes, Chicago Blackhawks, and Boston Bruins. He is a four-time Stanley Cup champion, winning three times with Edmonton and a fourth with Pittsburgh.

Coffey was born in Weston, Ontario, and grew up in Malton, Ontario. The city of Mississauga renamed Malton Arena to Paul Coffey Arena and Wildwood Park to Paul Coffey Park in a ceremony on September 23, 2016. In 2017, Coffey was named one of the 100 Greatest NHL Players in history.

== Playing career ==
=== Minor league hockey ===
In his youth, Coffey played in the 1974 Quebec International Pee-Wee Hockey Tournament with a minor ice hockey team from Mississauga.

=== Edmonton Oilers ===
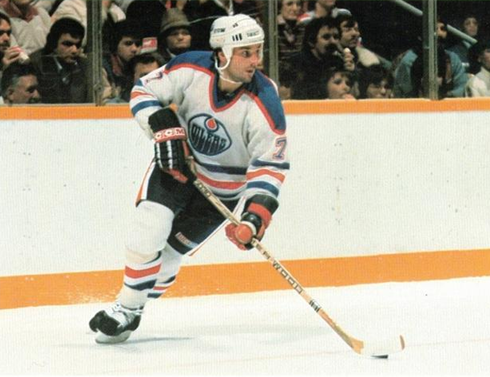
Coffey with the Edmonton Oilers c. 1984

Coffey was drafted sixth overall by the Edmonton Oilers in the 1980 NHL entry draft. In the 1981–82 season he scored 89 points and was named a second-team NHL All-Star. In the Oilers' first Stanley Cup-winning season, 1983–84, he became only the second defenceman in NHL history to score 40 goals in a season, and added 86 assists to finish second in point scoring. He won his first James Norris Memorial Trophy in 1984–85 while posting 37 goals and 121 points. On December 26, 1984, in a game against the Calgary Flames, Coffey became the last defenceman in the 20th century to score four goals in one game. Coffey went on to post a historic post-season in the 1985 playoffs, setting records for most goals (12), assists (25), and points (37) in one playoff year by a defenceman on the way to another Stanley Cup. In the 1985–86 season, where he was awarded his second Norris Trophy, Coffey scored 48 goals, which broke Bobby Orr's record for regular season goals by a defenceman (46 goals in 1974–75), and Coffey's 138 regular season points was second only to Orr (139 points in 1970–71) among defencemen.

Coffey helped Edmonton to a third Cup in 1986–87, but the deciding game seven of that year's Stanley Cup Final against the Philadelphia Flyers would be his last in an Oiler uniform. Coffey had two years remaining on a contract that paid him a reported $320,000 a year, but held out at the beginning of the 1987–88 season, wanting the contract renegotiated to pay him $800,000 a year. Team owner Peter Pocklington refused to do so, and offended Coffey by suggesting he lacked courage when playing; Coffey vowed never to put on an Edmonton uniform again and demanded a trade. On November 24, 1987, the Oilers traded Coffey, along with Dave Hunter and Wayne Van Dorp, to the Pittsburgh Penguins for Craig Simpson, Dave Hannan, Moe Mantha, and Chris Joseph.

=== Pittsburgh Penguins ===
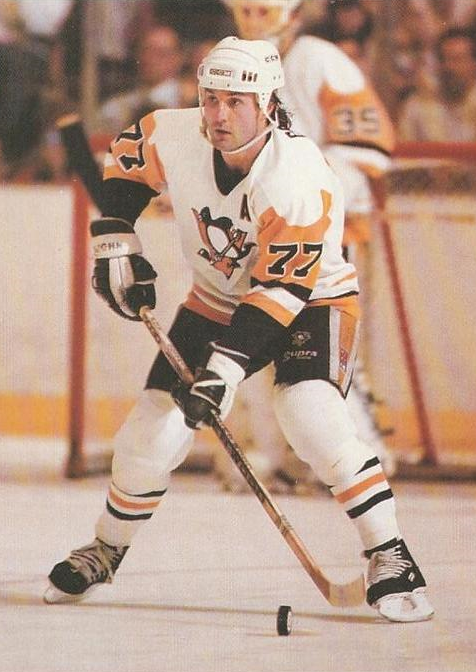
Coffey with the Penguins in 1989

As the Penguins' Rod Buskas was already wearing uniform number 7, Coffey agreed to change his uniform number from 7 to 77. Coffey would wear 77 for most of the rest of his career until his final season in Boston, where he wore 74. Coffey played four and a half seasons with Pittsburgh. On December 22, 1990, Coffey became the second defenceman after Denis Potvin to record 1,000 points, doing so in a record-breaking 770 games. In 1990–91, Coffey helped Pittsburgh to win their first Stanley Cup, which was also his fourth Cup, defeating the Minnesota North Stars in six games. During the 1991-92 season, the Penguins were coached by Scotty Bowman, who had stepped in after head coach Bob Johnson took a leave of absence for cancer treatment. Coffey passed Denis Potvin to become the career leader in goals, assists, and points by a defenceman, with Coffey leading these categories until the final season of his career. After 54 games, with Pittsburgh struggling despite being the defending Cup champions, Coffey's large salary made him expendable so he was traded to the Los Angeles Kings. In Los Angeles, he was reunited with former Oilers teammates Wayne Gretzky and Jari Kurri for parts of two seasons.

=== Detroit Red Wings ===
Having played just 10 games with the Kings in the 1992-93 season, he was traded to the Detroit Red Wings, where he played for three and a half seasons. Coffey was reunited with Scotty Bowman, who became the head coach of the Red Wings for 1993-94. In the lock-out shortened 1994–95 NHL season, Coffey led his team in scoring for the only time in his entire career and was awarded the Norris Trophy for the third time, as the Red Wings won the Presidents' Trophy for their first-place regular season finish. In the 1995 playoffs, he led all defencemen in scoring while helping Detroit to the Stanley Cup Finals. The Red Wings, however, were swept by the New Jersey Devils in four games. Coffey would then help the Red Wings to 62 regular season wins the following year as they clinched their second consecutive Presidents' Trophy, but they were upset by the Colorado Avalanche in the Western Conference Finals. During Game 1 of that series, Coffey scored two goals but also accidentally scored on his own net after Colorado's Stephane Yelle attempted to pass the puck into the slot, but it instead ended up on Coffey's stick.

=== Hartford Whalers and Philadelphia Flyers ===
After a falling-out with Red Wings head coach Scotty Bowman, Coffey was traded to the Hartford Whalers at the start of the 1996–97 season as part of a package to acquire Brendan Shanahan – a move that Coffey was unhappy with since the Whalers were a non-contending team. Coffey only played 20 games for the Whalers before engineering a trade to the Philadelphia Flyers. He played for the Flyers for a season and a half. In the 1997 Stanley Cup playoffs, Coffey's experience helped the Flyers get past the Pittsburgh Penguins (playing against old teammate Mario Lemieux) and New York Rangers (featuring former Oilers teammates Wayne Gretzky and Mark Messier) to reach 1997 Stanley Cup Final, which was also Coffey's seventh appearance in the Finals. In the Finals series against his former team, Detroit, Coffey was on the ice for six of Detroit's goals and was in the penalty box for a seventh when the Flyers conceded a power-play goal, having no points and being minus-2 and minus-3 in the first two games. Bowman had directed Detroit's players to specifically go after Coffey as a pressure point in the Flyers roster; a hit from Darren McCarty in game two left Coffey sidelined for the rest of the series with a concussion.

=== Chicago Blackhawks, Carolina Hurricanes and Boston Bruins ===
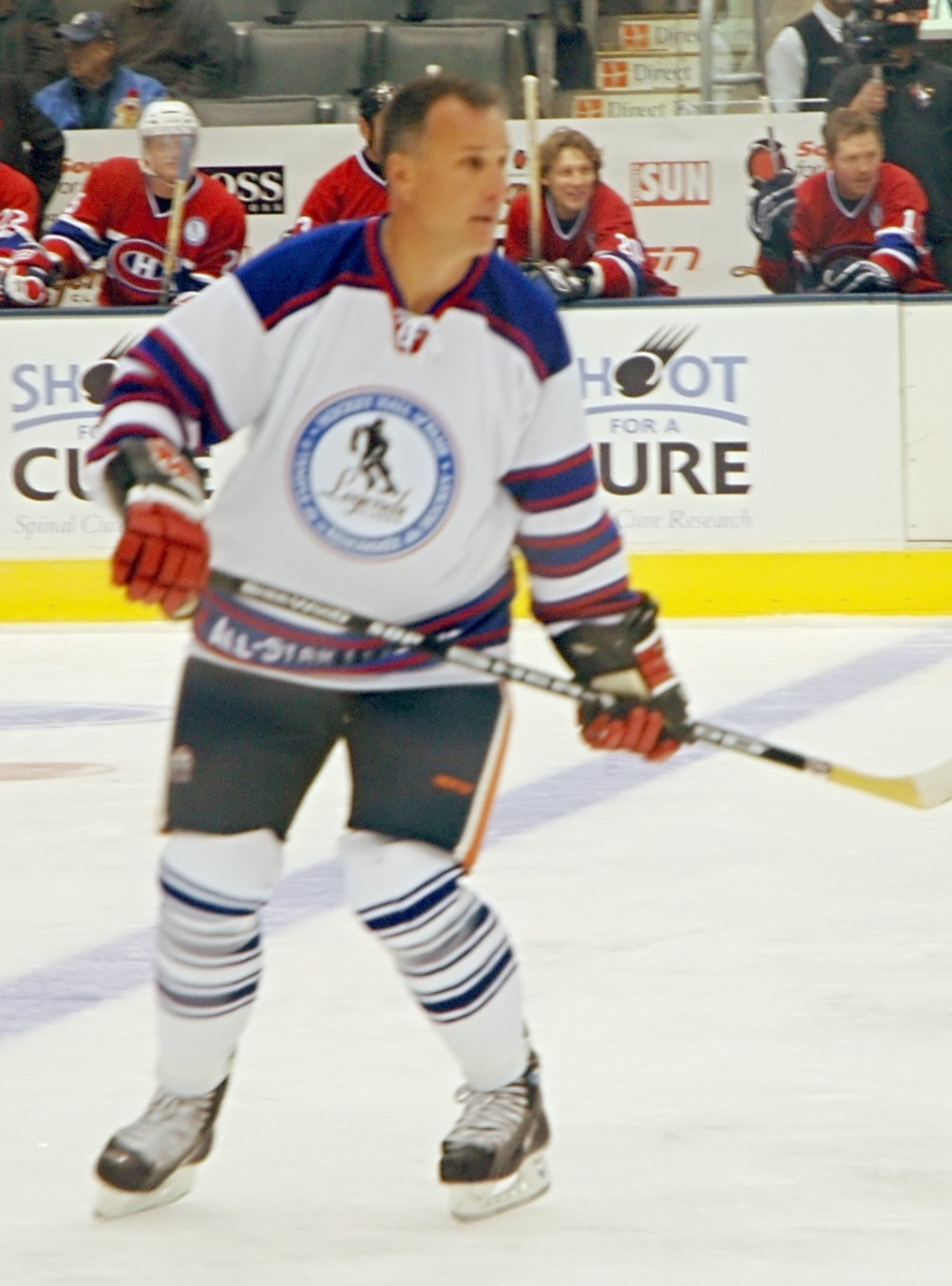
Coffey in 2009.

After 10 games with the Chicago Blackhawks, where he only picked up 4 assists and had a -6 rating, Coffey was traded to the Carolina Hurricanes (the relocated Hartford Whalers, whom Coffey had briefly played for in the 1996–97) for the rest of the 1998-99 season, where he played one and a half seasons. He had a slow start in the 1999-2000 season but finished strong with one of his best seasons in years.

As a free agent in the off-season of 2000, Coffey signed a two-year $4 million contract with the Boston Bruins, intending to fill the void left by Ray Bourque, who had been traded away to the Colorado Avalanche in spring 2000. This was also the last free agent acquisition by Harry Sinden, who relinquished his title as Bruins general manager early in the 2000-01 season. While Coffey wore number 77 since leaving the Edmonton Oilers, he wore 74 since Bourque had long worn 77 with the Bruins. Coffey missed 9 games due to injury and only appeared in 18 games, where he was unable to make defensive stops without being penalized, while also only getting four assists and failed to improve the Bruins' powerplay. After playing what would be his final NHL game at the Atlanta Thrashers on December 4, 2000, Coffey was waived by the Bruins. After his stint with the Bruins was finished, Coffey reported turned down two offers to return to the NHL. That season, Bourque passed his career goal, assist, and point records, and Bourque and Coffey both retired after the 2000–01 season.

Coffey finished his NHL career with 396 goals, 1135 assists, and 1531 points, and remains second only to Bourque in all-time career scoring by a defenceman. Coffey, however, averaged more points per game than did Bourque, having played 203 fewer games but lagging by only 48 points.

Coffey was traded seven times during his NHL career, with four of the teams that traded Coffey away ending up reaching the Stanley Cup Finals in that season or the subsequent season (Edmonton in 1988, Pittsburgh in 1992, Los Angeles in 1993, Detroit in 1997). Philadelphia did reach the 1997 Stanley Cup Finals in the same season that they acquired Coffey in a trade. Coffey was voted into the Hockey Hall of Fame in 2004, his first year of eligibility, and the Edmonton Oilers retired his uniform number 7 in 2005.

== Post-playing career ==
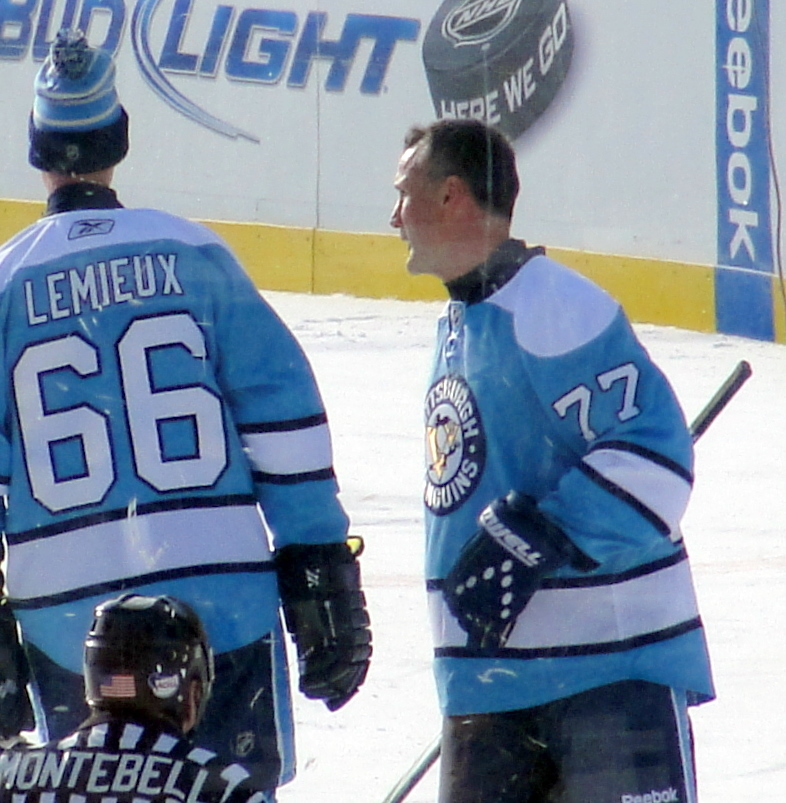
Coffey skated with former Pittsburgh Penguins teammate Mario Lemieux in the NHL Legends Game, December 31, 2010.

While coaching a game for the Toronto Marlboros midget 'AAA' team in February 2014, Coffey was assessed a gross misconduct penalty for a "discriminatory slur". The Greater Toronto Hockey League investigated the misconduct penalty and Coffey was handed a three-game suspension. Coffey is a co-owner of the OJHL's Pickering Panthers.

On November 12, 2023, Coffey returned to the Edmonton Oilers as the assistant coach. For the next two seasons, the Oilers would make the Stanley Cup Final, losing both times to the Florida Panthers. Prior to the beginning of the 2025–26 season, the Oilers announced that Coffey would be stepping back from coaching to resume his duties as an adviser for the team. Coffey returned to his coaching job in February 2026 during the Olympic break, following continued struggles by the team.

== Personal life ==
Coffey was the owner of a car dealership in Bolton, Ontario. Coffey and his wife have three children.

== Awards ==
- Named to the OHA second All-Star team – 1980
- Won the James Norris Memorial Trophy – 1985, 1986, 1995
- Named to the NHL first All-Star team – 1985, 1986, 1989, 1995
- Named to the NHL second All-Star team – 1982, 1983, 1984, 1990
- Played in the NHL All-Star Game – 1982, 1983, 1984, 1985, 1986, 1988, 1989, 1990, 1991, 1992, 1993, 1994, 1996, 1997
- 4-time Stanley Cup champion – 1984, 1985, 1987 (with Edmonton), 1991 (with Pittsburgh)
- Named to the Canada Cup All-Star team – 1984
- Inducted into the Hockey Hall of Fame in 2004
- In 1998, he was ranked number 28 on The Hockey News' list of the 100 Greatest Hockey Players
- As of 2024 14th all-time in career points (was 9th when he retired in 2000, but was passed by Mario Lemieux later in the 2000–01 season, Joe Sakic on January 1, 2007, Jaromír Jágr on October 12, 2007, Mark Recchi on March 29, 2011, and Joe Thornton)
- Was inducted into the Penguins Hall of Fame on November 15, 2007
- Was awarded the Order of Sport, marking his induction into Canada's Sports Hall of Fame – 2015

He is one of the 2016 inductees into Legends Row: Mississauga Walk of Fame.

== NHL records ==
- Most goals by a defenceman regular season and playoffs combined – 455

=== Regular season ===
- Most goals in one season by a defenceman – 48 in 1985–86
- Most shorthanded goals in one season by a defenceman – 9 in 1985–86
- Most assists in one game by a defenceman – 6 on March 14, 1986
- Most points in one game by a defenceman – 8 on March 14, 1986 (2 goals, 6 assists; shared with Tom Bladon 4 goals, 4 assists)
- Most seasons leading the league in scoring by a defenceman – 8
- Fastest defenceman in NHL history to score 1,000 points – 770 games
- Fastest defenceman to score 100 points (59 games) in a single season (shared with Bobby Orr)
- Longest point-scoring streak by a defenceman – 28 games in 1985–86 (point totals during streak 16 goals and 39 assists for 55 points)
- Most 40-goal seasons by a defenceman career – 2
- Most 50-assist seasons by a defenceman career – 14
- Most 60-assist seasons by a defenceman career – 11
- Most 70-assist seasons by a defenceman career – 6 (shared with Bobby Orr)
- Most 80-point seasons by a defenceman career – 8
- Highest goals per game average by a defenceman in one season – 0.608
- Highest career assist per game average by a defenceman – 0.806 (minimum 750 games)
- Highest career points per game average by a defenceman – 1.087 (minimum 750 games)
- Only defenceman in NHL history to be selected first-team All-Star playing for three different teams
- Most PIM by a 1,000-point defenceman – 1,802
- Most different teams played on by a 1,000-point scorer – 9 (tied with Jaromír Jágr)

=== Playoffs ===
- Most career goals by a defenceman in NHL playoff history – 59
- Most career points by a defenceman in NHL playoff history – 196
- Most goals by a defenceman, one playoff year – 12 in 1985
- Most assists by a defenceman, one playoff year – 25 in 1985 (broken by Evan Bouchard in 2024)
- Most points by a defenceman, one playoff year – 37 in 1985
- Most points by a defenceman, one playoff series – 11 in 1985
- Most assists by a defenceman, five-game series – 8 in 1985
- Most assists in one period – 3 in 1985
- Most career short-handed goals by a defenceman in NHL playoff history – 6
- Most short-handed goals by a defenceman, one playoff year – 2 in 1983 and 1996
- Highest Plus/Minus by a defenceman, one playoff year – +26 in 1985
- Highest goals per game average in one playoff year by a defenceman – 0.667 in 1985 (minimum 10 playoff games)
- Highest assists per game average in one playoff year by a defenceman – 1.389 in 1985 (minimum 5 playoff games)
- Highest points per game average in one playoff year by a defenceman – 2.056 in 1985
- Highest career goals per game average in playoffs by a defenceman – 0.304 (minimum 75 games)
- Highest career assists per game average in playoffs by a defenceman – 0.706 (minimum 100 games)
- Highest career points per game average in playoffs by a defenceman – 1.010 (minimum 100 games)

== Career statistics ==
=== Regular season and playoffs ===
Figures in boldface italics are NHL records for defencemen.

			Regular season					Playoffs
Season	Team	League	GP	G	A	Pts	PIM	GP	G	A	Pts	PIM
1977–78	North York Rangers	OPJHL	50	14	33	47	64	—	—	—	—	—
1977–78	Kingston Canadians	OMJHL	8	2	2	4	11	5	0	0	0	0
1978–79	Sault Ste. Marie Greyhounds	OMJHL	68	17	72	89	103	—	—	—	—	—
1979–80	Sault Ste. Marie Greyhounds	OMJHL	23	10	21	31	63	—	—	—	—	—
1979–80	Kitchener Rangers	OMJHL	52	19	52	71	130	—	—	—	—	—
1980–81	Edmonton Oilers	NHL	74	9	23	32	130	9	4	3	7	22
1981–82	Edmonton Oilers	NHL	80	29	60	89	106	5	1	1	2	6
1982–83	Edmonton Oilers	NHL	80	29	67	96	87	16	7	7	14	14
1983–84	Edmonton Oilers	NHL	80	40	86	126	104	19	8	14	22	21
1984–85	Edmonton Oilers	NHL	80	37	84	121	97	18	**12**	25	**37**	44
1985–86	Edmonton Oilers	NHL	79	**48**	90	138	120	10	1	9	10	30
1986–87	Edmonton Oilers	NHL	59	17	50	67	49	17	3	8	11	30
1987–88	Pittsburgh Penguins	NHL	46	15	52	67	93	—	—	—	—	—
1988–89	Pittsburgh Penguins	NHL	75	30	83	113	195	11	2	13	15	31
1989–90	Pittsburgh Penguins	NHL	80	29	74	103	95	—	—	—	—	—
1990–91	Pittsburgh Penguins	NHL	76	24	69	93	128	12	2	9	11	6
1991–92	Pittsburgh Penguins	NHL	54	10	54	64	62	—	—	—	—	—
1991–92	Los Angeles Kings	NHL	10	1	4	5	25	6	4	3	7	2
1992–93	Los Angeles Kings	NHL	50	8	49	57	50	—	—	—	—	—
1992–93	Detroit Red Wings	NHL	30	4	26	30	27	7	2	9	11	2
1993–94	Detroit Red Wings	NHL	80	14	63	77	106	7	1	6	7	8
1994–95	Detroit Red Wings	NHL	45	14	44	58	72	18	6	12	18	10
1995–96	Detroit Red Wings	NHL	76	14	60	74	90	17	5	9	14	30
1996–97	Hartford Whalers	NHL	20	3	5	8	18	—	—	—	—	—
1996–97	Philadelphia Flyers	NHL	37	6	20	26	20	17	1	8	9	6
1997–98	Philadelphia Flyers	NHL	57	2	27	29	30	—	—	—	—	—
1998–99	Chicago Blackhawks	NHL	10	0	4	4	0	—	—	—	—	—
1998–99	Carolina Hurricanes	NHL	44	2	8	10	25	5	0	1	1	2
1999–2000	Carolina Hurricanes	NHL	69	11	29	40	40	—	—	—	—	—
2000–01	Boston Bruins	NHL	18	0	4	4	30	—	—	—	—	—
NHL totals			1,409	396	1,135	1,531	1,802	194	59	137	196	264

=== International ===
Medal record

Representing Canada

Ice hockey

Canada Cup
Gold medal – first place	1991 Canada	
Gold medal – first place	1987 Canada	
Gold medal – first place	1984 Canada	

World Cup
Silver medal – second place	1996 Canada	

Year	Team	Event		GP	G	A	Pts	PIM
1984	Canada	CC	1st place, gold medalist(s)	8	3	8	11	4
1987	Canada	CC	1st place, gold medalist(s)	9	2	4	6	0
1990	Canada	WC	4th	10	1	6	7	10
1991	Canada	CC	1st place, gold medalist(s)	8	1	6	7	8
1996	Canada	WCH	2nd place, silver medalist(s)	8	0	7	7	12
Senior totals				43	7	31	38	34

== See also ==
- Hockey Hall of Fame
- James Norris Memorial Trophy
- List of NHL statistical leaders
- List of NHL players with 1,000 points
- List of NHL players with 1,000 games played

Preceded by Kevin Lowe	Edmonton Oilers first-round draft pick 1980	Succeeded by Grant Fuhr
Preceded by Rod Langway; Ray Bourque	Winner of the Norris Trophy; 1985, 1986; 1995	Succeeded by Ray Bourque; Chris Chelios
