= Al Iafrate =

American ice hockey player (born 1966)

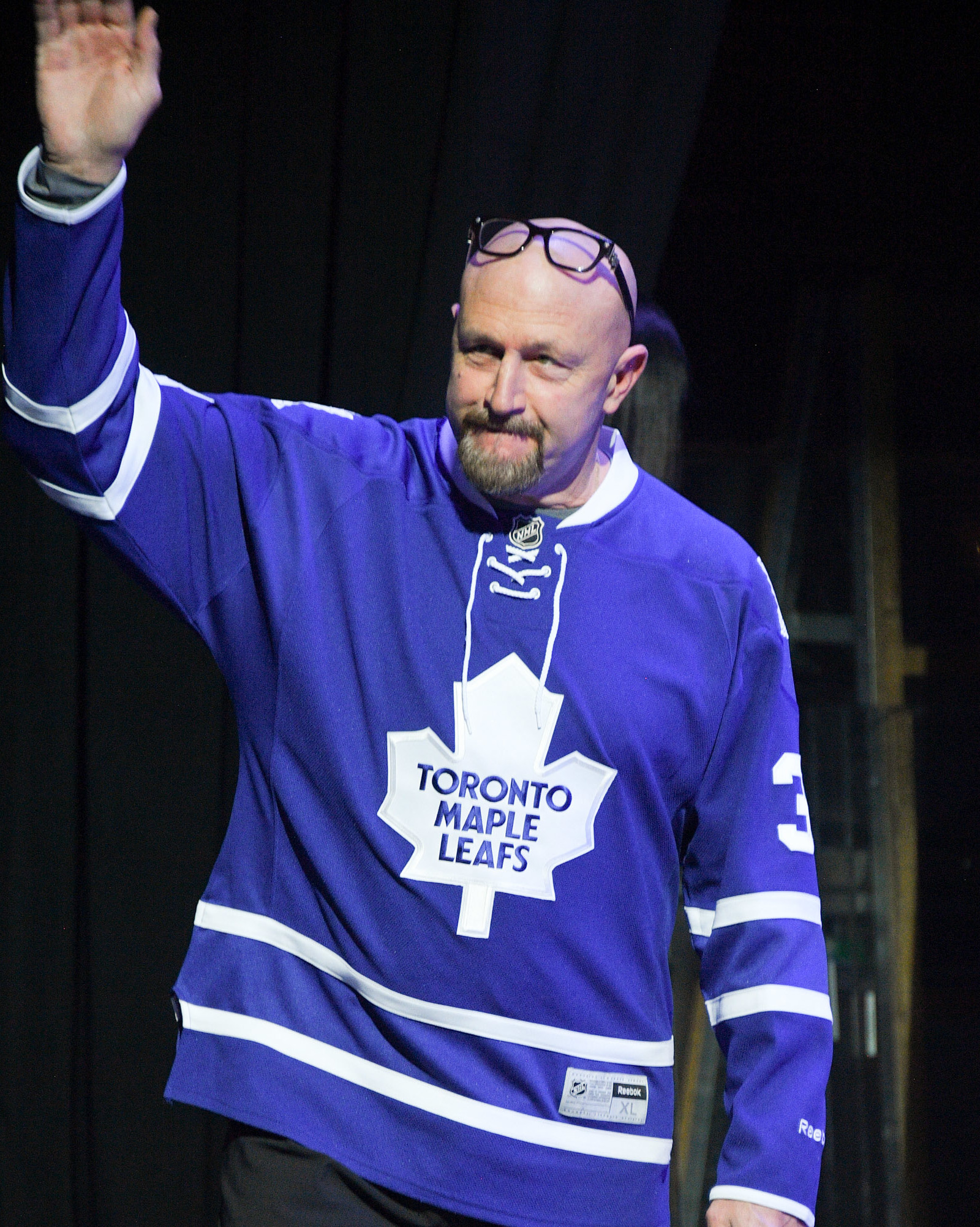
- Iafrate in 2018
- Born: March 21, 1966 (age 60) Dearborn, Michigan, U.S.
- Height: 6 ft 3 in (191 cm)
- Weight: 240 lb (109 kg; 17 st 2 lb)
- Position: Defense
- Shot: Left
- Played for: Toronto Maple Leafs; Washington Capitals; Boston Bruins; San Jose Sharks
- National team: United States
- NHL draft: 4th overall, 1984; Toronto Maple Leafs
- Playing career: 1984–1998

Albert Anthony Iafrate (/ˌaɪ.əˈfreɪtiː/ EYE-ə-FRAY-tee; born March 21, 1966) is an American former professional ice hockey defenseman who played in the National Hockey League between 1984 and 1998. He was born in Dearborn, Michigan, and grew up in Livonia, Michigan.

Iafrate had one of the hardest slapshots in hockey history. He set a record for velocity during the NHL Skills Competition of 1993, a record which stood for 16 years, at 105.2 miles per hour (169.3 km/h). The record was broken in 2009 by Zdeno Chára of the Boston Bruins with a slapshot at 105.4 mph in Montreal.

Internationally, Iafrate has represented the United States at the 1984 Winter Olympics and 1998 IIHF World Championship.

== Playing career ==
=== Amateur ===
As a youth, Iafrate played in the 1979 Quebec International Pee-Wee Hockey Tournament with a minor ice hockey team from Detroit.

Iafrate was selected fourth overall by the Toronto Maple Leafs in the 1984 NHL entry draft after a standout career with the Windsor Compuware Spitfires and a short but distinguished stay with the Belleville Bulls of the Ontario Hockey League (OHL). Iafrate played for Team USA in the 1984 Winter Olympics at Sarajevo, Yugoslavia. During the summer of 1984 Iafrate was driving a car with teammate Mike Vellucci when it crashed and flipped multiple times. Vellucci was thrown from the car and broke his back, missing the entire 1984–85 season, while Iafrate broke some ribs.

=== Toronto Maple Leafs ===
Iafrate began his NHL career with the Toronto Maple Leafs in 1984 and played 68 games as a rookie blue liner putting up 21 points for the struggling club. His breakthrough came during his fourth season in the league when his heavy slapshot helped him score 22 goals and 52 points and Iafrate skated in his first All-Star Game. Injuries limited him to 65 games and 33 points the following year but he was back on track in 1989–90 putting up 21 goals and 63 points making a return trip to the All-Star Game representing the Maple Leafs. Iafrate failed to build on his career-best campaign and got off to a slow start in 1990–91 and eventually grew tired of the fishbowl pressures of playing in Toronto and personal issues with teammate Gary Leeman so he requested a trade out of town. After 41 games in Toronto, Iafrate was dealt to the Washington Capitals in exchange for Peter Zezel and Bob Rouse. Toronto General Manager Floyd Smith was aware of what he had given up in the deal: "This year he hasn't played like an All-Star, and he'd be the first to admit that, but he certainly has the ability."

=== Washington Capitals ===
With the Capitals, Iafrate joined an offensively potent defensive core featuring Kevin Hatcher and Calle Johansson and began to flourish. He posted 17 goals his first full season in Washington then set career-highs the next year with 25 goals and 66 points and garnered league-wide attention at the All-Star game when he unleashed a 105.2-mile-per-hour slapshot in the Skills Competition. At the trade deadline in 1993–94, Iafrate was dealt to the Boston Bruins in a trade that landed Joé Juneau in Washington. The Capitals, who for years were built from the defense out, sacrificed Iafrate in an effort to beef up their offense. General Manager David Poile, at the time of the trade told The Washington Post "Al is more a victim of us wanting to go after an offensive player."

=== Boston Bruins ===
With the Bruins, Iafrate fit in instantly and put up 13 points in 12 games to finish the season then added four more in the post season. Unfortunately for Iafrate, those would be the last games he played in Boston because back and knee injuries caused him to miss the entire 1994–95 and 1995–96 seasons. After two years on the sidelines and a lost court battle over his 1995–96 salary, the Bruins decided to move on and dealt Iafrate to the San Jose Sharks in exchange for the Sharks captain Jeff Odgers and a fifth-round draft pick.

=== San Jose Sharks ===
For the Sharks acquiring Iafrate—and his battered knees—represented a roll of the dice with no guarantee he'd be able to return or play at the level he previously had. Sharks General Manager Dean Lombardi acknowledged the risk: "We figured with this kind of player it was worth taking a chance." The gamble, unfortunately, didn't pay off and Iafrate was severely limited by his litany of knee injuries and only managed to suit up for 59 games over the next two seasons for the Sharks.

=== Carolina Hurricanes ===
In the summer of 1998, Iafrate inked an incentive-laden deal with the Carolina Hurricanes. The contract had a base-salary of $300,000 but could be worth as much as $3 million should he be able to play to his previous level. However, before he even went to training camp Iafrate determined his health was still not where it needed to be and announced his retirement from the NHL at age 32. "We share Al's disappointment in having to announce his retirement," Carolina General Manager Jim Rutherford said at the time. "We knew when we signed him that his health may prove to be a question mark."

=== Comeback attempt ===
In the summer of 2001, at age 35, Iafrate contemplated a comeback and contacted Rutherford about joining the Hurricanes on a try-out basis. His former agent, Rick Curran, told the Raleigh News & Observer about his plans: "He has been considering the possibility of coming in and trying to play again and testing his knee to see if it can withstand playing professional hockey again." Ultimately, it never came to be and Iafrate walked away from professional hockey for good.

Iafrate played 799 career NHL games over twelve NHL seasons, scoring 152 goals and 311 assists for 463 points. He also compiled 1301 penalty minutes. His best season statistically was the 1992–93 season, when he scored 25 goals and 41 assists with the Washington Capitals. His career season also included a hat trick, the first for a Capitals defenseman in a Stanley Cup playoffs game, on April 29, 1993.

Iafrate dealt with numerous injuries throughout his career, including a torn anterior cruciate ligament in a knee, sciatic nerve damage in his back, and a ruptured appendix. Because of injuries, Iafrate missed all of the 1994–95 and 1995–96 seasons, and played only 59 NHL games after his return, retiring after the 1997–98 season at age 32. Iafrate attempted comebacks during the 1998–99 and 2001–02 seasons, although these comebacks ended during training camp.

Iafrate was previously involved with the research and development department with Warrior Hockey.

== Awards ==
Selected to four NHL All-Star Games: 1988, 1990, 1993, 1994

Named to the NHL second All-Star team in 1992–93.

NHL Playoffs Most Goals by Defenseman (6): 1992–93

== Career statistics ==
=== Regular season and playoffs ===
| | | | Regular season | | | | | Playoffs |
| Season | Team | League | GP | G | A | Pts | PIM | GP | G | A | Pts | PIM |
|---|---|---|---|---|---|---|---|---|---|---|---|---|
| 1982–83 | Detroit Compuware Ambassadors | MNHL | 66 | 30 | 45 | 75 | 90 | — | — | — | — | — |
| 1983–84 | United States | Intl | 55 | 4 | 17 | 21 | 26 | — | — | — | — | — |
| 1983–84 | Belleville Bulls | OHL | 10 | 2 | 4 | 6 | 2 | 3 | 0 | 1 | 1 | 5 |
| 1984–85 | Toronto Maple Leafs | NHL | 68 | 5 | 16 | 21 | 51 | — | — | — | — | — |
| 1985–86 | Toronto Maple Leafs | NHL | 65 | 8 | 25 | 33 | 40 | 10 | 0 | 3 | 3 | 4 |
| 1986–87 | Toronto Maple Leafs | NHL | 80 | 9 | 21 | 30 | 55 | 13 | 1 | 3 | 4 | 11 |
| 1987–88 | Toronto Maple Leafs | NHL | 77 | 22 | 30 | 52 | 80 | 6 | 3 | 4 | 7 | 6 |
| 1988–89 | Toronto Maple Leafs | NHL | 65 | 13 | 20 | 33 | 72 | — | — | — | — | — |
| 1989–90 | Toronto Maple Leafs | NHL | 75 | 21 | 42 | 63 | 135 | — | — | — | — | — |
| 1990–91 | Toronto Maple Leafs | NHL | 42 | 3 | 15 | 18 | 113 | — | — | — | — | — |
| 1990–91 | Washington Capitals | NHL | 30 | 6 | 8 | 14 | 124 | 10 | 1 | 3 | 4 | 22 |
| 1991–92 | Washington Capitals | NHL | 78 | 17 | 34 | 51 | 180 | 7 | 4 | 2 | 6 | 14 |
| 1992–93 | Washington Capitals | NHL | 81 | 25 | 41 | 66 | 169 | 6 | 6 | 0 | 6 | 4 |
| 1993–94 | Washington Capitals | NHL | 67 | 10 | 35 | 45 | 143 | — | — | — | — | — |
| 1993–94 | Boston Bruins | NHL | 12 | 5 | 8 | 13 | 20 | 13 | 3 | 1 | 4 | 6 |
| 1996–97 | San Jose Sharks | NHL | 38 | 6 | 9 | 15 | 91 | — | — | — | — | — |
| 1997–98 | San Jose Sharks | NHL | 21 | 2 | 7 | 9 | 28 | 6 | 1 | 0 | 1 | 10 |
| NHL totals | | | 799 | 152 | 311 | 463 | 1,301 | 71 | 19 | 16 | 35 | 77 |

=== International ===
| Year | Team | Event | GP | G | A | Pts | PIM |
|---|---|---|---|---|---|---|---|
| 1984 | United States | OG | 6 | 0 | 0 | 0 | 2 |
| 1998 | United States | WC | 4 | 0 | 2 | 2 | 6 |
| Senior totals | | | 10 | 0 | 2 | 2 | 8 |

| Preceded by Russ Courtnall | Toronto Maple Leafs first-round draft pick 1984 | Succeeded by Wendel Clark |
