= Wayne Bonney =

Canadian ice hockey official

Wayne Bonney (born May 27, 1953, in Ottawa, Ontario) is a retired National Hockey League linesman. His NHL career started in 1979 after a brilliant career with the WHA, and ended in 2004. During his career (in which he wore a helmet from the mid-1980s until his retirement), he officiated 2,470 regular season games (both WHA and NHL), 134 playoff games, five Stanley Cup finals, the 1996 World Cup of Hockey, and one All-Star game. From the 1994-95 NHL season until his retirement, he wore uniform number 94. He also became the first NHL official to wear a visor. On November 3, 1990, Bonney worked two games in one day. He worked a matinee game between the Chicago Blackhawks and the Philadelphia Flyers at The Spectrum in Philadelphia, later that day he worked the game between the Buffalo Sabres and the Boston Bruins at the Boston Garden, when Gerard Gauthier the linesman who was scheduled to work the game was ill and could not make it.
