= Jari Kurri =

Finnish ice hockey player (born 1960)

- Hockey Hall of Fame, 2001
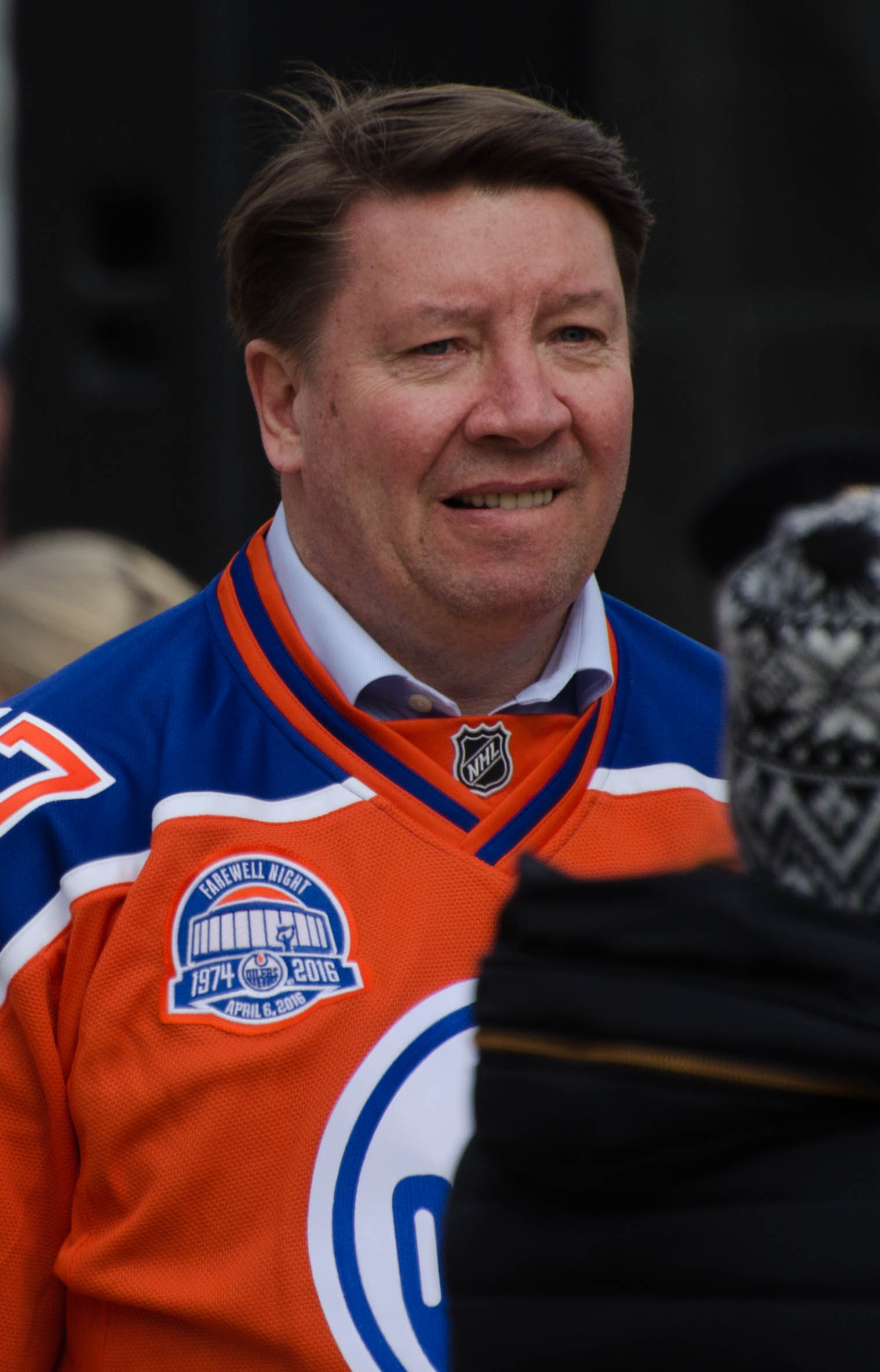
- Kurri in 2016
- Born: 18 May 1960 (age 66) Helsinki, Finland
- Height: 6 ft 1 in (185 cm)
- Weight: 195 lb (88 kg; 13 st 13 lb)
- Position: Right wing
- Shot: Right
- Played for: Jokerit; Edmonton Oilers; Devils Milano; Los Angeles Kings; New York Rangers; Mighty Ducks of Anaheim; Colorado Avalanche
- National team: Finland
- NHL draft: 69th overall, 1980; Edmonton Oilers
- Playing career: 1977–1998
Medal record
Representing Finland
Men's ice hockey
Olympic Games
| Bronze medal – third place | 1998 Nagano | Team |
Canada Cup
| Bronze medal – third place | 1991 Canada |
World Championships
| Silver medal – second place | 1994 Italy |
European Championship
| Bronze medal – third place | 1991 Finland |
World Junior Championships
| Silver medal – second place | 1980 Finland |
IIHF European Junior Championships
| Gold medal – first place | 1978 Finland |

Jari Pekka Kurri (Finnish pronunciation: [ˈjɑri ˈpekːɑ ˈkurːi]; born 18 May 1960) is a Finnish former professional ice hockey player. Beginning in 1980, he played right wing for five National Hockey League (NHL) teams: the Edmonton Oilers, the Los Angeles Kings, the New York Rangers, the Mighty Ducks of Anaheim, and the Colorado Avalanche. Prior to his NHL career, Kurri excelled for Jokerit in the SM-liiga, and he rose from playing in the Finnish junior ice hockey team to the country's national hockey team in two years. He was drafted in the fourth round of the 1980 NHL draft by the Oilers and immediately played for the team that year.

Kurri played 17 seasons in the NHL, along with one season in Serie A for Devils Milano. Armed with a quick release for his shot, Kurri recorded a 30-goal season in each of his first ten seasons in the NHL, which included being the NHL goal scoring leader in the 1985–86 season. Kurri led all skaters in goals in the Stanley Cup playoffs on four occasions, including tying the all-time postseason record with 19 in 1985. While he never won the Frank J. Selke Trophy for his defensive skill, he won the Lady Byng Memorial Trophy for his sportsmanship in 1985. He won the Stanley Cup five times, all with the Oilers, as one of just seven players to be part of all five Cup-winning teams with Edmonton. He was the 18th player in NHL history and first Finnish player to score 500 goals, doing so in 1992, and he became the eighth player to score 600 goals, doing so in his final season in 1997.

Kurri's No. 17 jersey was retired by the Edmonton Oilers and Jokerit. Internationally, Kurri played on the Finland men's national ice hockey team, winning a bronze medal at the 1998 Winter Olympics. He was inducted into the IIHF Hall of Fame in 2000 and the Hockey Hall of Fame in 2001. After his playing career ended, Kurri served as the general manager of the Finnish national team from 2003 to 2014 before becoming GM of Jokerit in 2013; he became owner in 2019 before selling the team in 2022. In 2017, Kurri was named one of the 100 Greatest NHL Players in history.

== Playing career ==
=== Early years (1977–1980) ===
Kurri began his pro career with Jokerit in the Finnish SM-liiga. After an eleven-point rookie season for Jokerit in the 1977–78 season, Kurri scored 30 and 39 points the next two years, playing all 33 games in each season.

In March 1979, Kurri played for the Finnish national team in Edmonton, versus the World Hockey Association-leading Edmonton Oilers. As related by Kurri, he was not initially aiming to play in the NHL, noting that the dream for someone growing up in Finland was playing for the national team. He noted in a 2022 interview:

When we won the European junior championship, we heard there were scouts watching us play. That’s the first time I’d ever heard that people were following us. Matti Vaisanen explained to me (before the draft), that this might be happening. Don Baizley was my agent, based in Winnipeg, and he told me the [Winnipeg] Jets were interested, too, and might even draft me in the early rounds. But somehow there was a rumor over here (North America) that I’d signed a contract with the national federation to play at home until 1982, that I had a contract with the Finnish federation for two more years. I didn’t. It was not true. Matti Vaisanen knew that; maybe Winnipeg didn’t.

=== Edmonton Oilers (1980–1990) ===
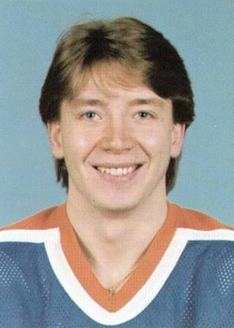
1984 headshot of Kurri with the Edmonton Oilers

After his third professional season, Kurri was eligible for the 1980 NHL entry draft, although most teams believed that he still had to fulfill his mandatory military service. Barry Fraser, director of scouting for the Edmonton Oilers, elected to go with Kurri as one of his picks, with the team selecting him with the 69th overall pick. Kurri remains regarded as one of the greatest "steals" in NHL draft history. When Kurri joined the Oilers, he was accompanied by fellow Finnish players Risto Siltanen and Matti Hagman, which made him feel more comfortable in playing in the league beyond terming it as a "one-year experiment". Oilers coach Glen Sather paired Kurri and Hagman early in the year before eventually putting Kurri with Wayne Gretzky on the same line. Kurri and Gretzky became one of the most prolific scoring duos ever to play in the NHL. Despite not always playing on the same line, Gretzky assisted on 364 of Kurri's 601 career goals, while Kurri had an assist on 196 Gretzky goals.

Kurri played in 75 games as a rookie in the 1980–81 season. He recorded his first assist in his first NHL game on 10 October against the Quebec Nordiques. Eight days later against the New York Islanders, Kurri recorded his first-ever goal off Ron Low in the 5–5 tie. On 26 November, he had his first hat trick, doing so against the Chicago Black Hawks with Tony Esposito as goaltender in Edmonton. Kurri went through a dry spell of seventeen games without a goal but credited Gretzky as encouraging him to not worry. In total, Kurri recorded 32 goals and 43 assists for a 75-point season. The Oilers reached the Stanley Cup playoffs in every season that Kurri played with them. In his first playoff game on 8 April, he scored two goals and recorded an assist in the 6–3 victory over the Montreal Canadiens; in total, he had 12 points in nine games. In his sophomore season with the Oilers, he scored 32 goals and recorded his first 50-assist season with 54. Kurri played in all 80 games of the 1982–83 season, scoring 45 goals and 59 assists for his first 100-point season, finishing with 104. He was named to the All-Star Game while receiving votes for the Byng and Selke Trophies for the first time in his career. Kurri reached his first Stanley Cup Final that year, doing so with eight goals and 15 assists for 23 points (with Kurri scoring a goal in each of the first three games of the Final) as the Oilers lost to the New York Islanders.

The 1983–84 season saw Kurri achieve his first 50-goal season. One particular highlight saw him score five goals in the 19 November game against the New Jersey Devils (with Glenn Resch and later Ron Low as goaltender) at home in Edmonton. He scored 52 goals and recorded 61 assists for 113 points in 64 total games. He finished 3rd in the Selke and Byng Trophy voting and was named to the NHL All-Star team on the Second Team. In the Stanley Cup playoffs that year, Kurri started it with his first postseason hat trick in game one of the first round against Winnipeg. He scored two goals with an assist in the 7–4 win in game seven of the second round matchup against Calgary to start a five-game streak where Kurri recorded a goal; in the four-game sweep of the Minnesota North Stars, he scored five goals with three assists as the Oilers faced the Islanders in the Stanley Cup Final once again. Kurri was held in check in the first two games but recorded an assist in game three and two in game four before scoring a goal in the decisive game five to go along with two assists that saw the Oilers win their first Stanley Cup. Kurri's 14 goals in the postseason led all skaters.

The Oilers repeated as champions the following season, and Kurri had his peak in goals (71) and assists (64) for 135 total points in 73 total games. He missed three of the first 50 games that season, which saw him narrowly miss out on scoring 50 goals in 50 games, as Kurri got his 50th goal in the 53rd game of the season. He led the league in even-strength goals with 54 and game-winning goals with 13. He was named a First Team All-Star and won the Lady Byng Memorial Trophy for his sportsmanship. In the 1985 Stanley Cup playoffs, Kurri excelled on a historical level. Kurri had a goal in three of the first six playoff games before starting his run of goals with game four of the second-round matchup against Winnipeg, where he recorded a hat trick in the 8–3 victory to send the Oilers to the third round. Against the Chicago Blackhawks, Kurri logged two goals in game one before logging a hat trick in game two as the Oilers won each time. He was held scoreless in the subsequent losses in game three and 4 before exploding in game five for three goals in a 10–5 victory before sending the Oilers to the Stanley Cup Final with a four-goal night in the 8–2 victory of game six. He set thtrr records with the hat trick: most hat tricks in a single postseason (4), most goals in a single postseason series (12), and most hat tricks in a single postseason series (3). In the buildup to the Stanley Cup Final against the Philadelphia Flyers, Kurri was labeled as one "may be the most underrated player in hockey." He was held in check for the first two games before recording an assist to start game three and recording two assists in game four. In the decisive game five, he scored the opening goal before recording three assists in the eventual 8–3 victory. Kurri tied the record for most goals in a postseason set by Reggie Leach in the 1976 Stanley Cup playoffs (Leach played in sixteen games, whereas Kurri played in eighteen). All four records that Kurri reached that year still stand as of 2026.

Kurri led all players in goals for the 1985–86 season with 68 and was named to the Second All-Star team. He had his longest streak of games with a goal during the season, recording a goal in ten straight games from 29 January to 19 February. He was limited to just two goals in the playoffs with ten assists as the Oilers were shocked in the second round by the Calgary Flames. Kurri recorded his fourth and final 50-goal season with 54 in 79 games to earn a First Team All-Star selection. In the playoffs that year, Kurri had his second and last career four-goal game in the playoffs in game two of the first round series against the Los Angeles Kings. In the Stanley Cup Final against the Flyers, he recorded a point in all seven games, which included goals in four of the first five games. In game seven, he scored the goal that gave the Oilers a 2–1 lead that they would not relinquish, giving him credit for the game-winning goal, his 5th of the postseason; his 15 goals led all skaters. He played in all 80 games of the 1987–88 season but recorded just 96 points, the only time from 1982 to 1989 that he did not have a 100-point season. He was however named to the All-Star Game. In the last playoffs with Gretzky and Kurri together as teammates in Edmonton in 1988, Kurri led all skaters in postseason goals for the fourth and final time with 14 goals to go along with 17 assists. Gretzky was traded after the Final to the Los Angeles Kings. In the eight years that Gretzky and Kurri played together in Edmonton, they scored the same amount of playoff goals with 79 each.

Kurri responded by recording his final 100-point season in the 1988–89 season with 102 on 44 goals and 58 assists in 76 games; at the time, only nine other players in NHL history had record six 100-point seasons for a career. In what became his final season with the Oilers in the 1989–90 season, he scored 33 goals with 60 assists; in total, following Gretzky's trade, Kurri recorded 195 points in 154 games. In 22 games of the Stanley Cup playoffs, he had ten goals and 15 assists. In game two on 18 May of the Stanley Cup Final versus the Boston Bruins, Kurri tied the NHL record for most points in a Stanley Cup Final game with five, doing so on three goals and two assists; no player has recorded five points in a Stanley Cup Final game since Kurri did so. The Oilers won the Final in four games for their fifth and final championship in a six-year span. Kurri became the first player with 90 Stanley Cup playoff goals in NHL history and held the postseason record until he was passed by Gretzky the following year.

During his career in Edmonton, he was nicknamed the "Finnish Flash" (a title since bestowed on Teemu Selänne). Kurri was "by far our most complete player", according to Oilers' director of personnel Barry Fraser. Although Kurri never won the Selke Trophy, he was regarded as one of the best defensive forwards in the NHL. Kurri was one of only seven players to win the Cup five times with Edmonton, serving alongside Glenn Anderson, Grant Fuhr, Randy Gregg, Charlie Huddy, Kevin Lowe, and Mark Messier. In the timespan of 1980 to 1990, Kurri was second for all skaters playing in that same period with 474 and was fourth in points (1,043).

=== Later career (1990–1998) ===
After the Final ended, Kurri moved back to his native Finland and prepared for a change. He elected to sign with the Devils Milano of the Italian Serie A on a two-year contract that paid him $1 million. Kurri had 27 goals and 48 assists in 30 games. He also used the time to play for Finland in the World Championships, where he scored 12 points in ten games and made the international All-Star team.

After a season in Italy, Kurri stated his desire to be traded to the Los Angeles Kings to reunite with Gretzky as a teammate. On 30 May 1991, his rights were traded to the Philadelphia Flyers alongside Dave Brown and Corey Foster for Craig Fisher, Scott Mellanby, and Craig Berube. Philadelphia then traded him alongside Jeff Chychrun to the Kings for Steve Duchesne, Steve Kasper, and a 1991 fourth-round draft pick; as negotiated prior to the trade, Kurri and the team agreed to a four-year contract for $3.75 million, which Kurri accepted (reportedly, the Detroit Red Wings offered more money but Kurri went with Los Angeles). He made an impression in his first game as a King, scoring three goals on opening night versus the Winnipeg Jets. He recorded just 23 goals and 37 assists while recording a plus-minus of -24. In the 1992–93 season, with Gretzky missing a significant portion of the season due to a back injury, Kurri (once described as a player with strengths that matched the "strengths of a center") was tasked with playing the center position that saw him take faceoffs for a good chunk of the year. On 17 October 1992, he scored his 500th career goal, scoring on an empty net late in a victory against the Boston Bruins at The Forum. He had 27 goals and 60 assists in 82 games. The Kings, with a rejuvenated Gretzky, made a run all the way to the Stanley Cup Final, where Kurri collected 17 points in 24 games as the Kings lost to the Montreal Canadiens in five games. He had his final 30-goal season in the 1993–94 season (his eleventh) but had a -24 plus-minus rating.

During the 1994–95 NHL lockout, Kurri represented Jokerit, the team for which he played before his NHL career. He had ten goals and nine assists in 20 games while playing alongside Teemu Selänne. The team won the 1994 IIHF European Cup with a 4–2 victory over the Russian club HC Lada Togliatti. Kurri played in 38 NHL games that year and scored ten goals with 19 assists. Late in the 1995–96 season on 14 March 1996, with the Kings looking to cut payroll, the team traded Kurri alongside Marty McSorley and Shane Churla to the New York Rangers for Ray Ferraro, Ian Laperriere, Nathan LaFayette, and Mattias Norstrom. Kurri went on to post one goal and four assists in 14 games. In the playoffs, he notched eight points in 11 playoff games with the Rangers.

After his short period with the Rangers, Kurri signed with the Mighty Ducks of Anaheim on 14 August 1996 as a free agent on a one-year contract (with a second-year option) for $1.5 million. While Kurri played in all 82 games of that season for Anaheim, he recorded just 13 goals with 22 assists while being a -13. In the playoff run that year, he had a goal in game two of the second-round matchup against Detroit for his 106th and final postseason goal.

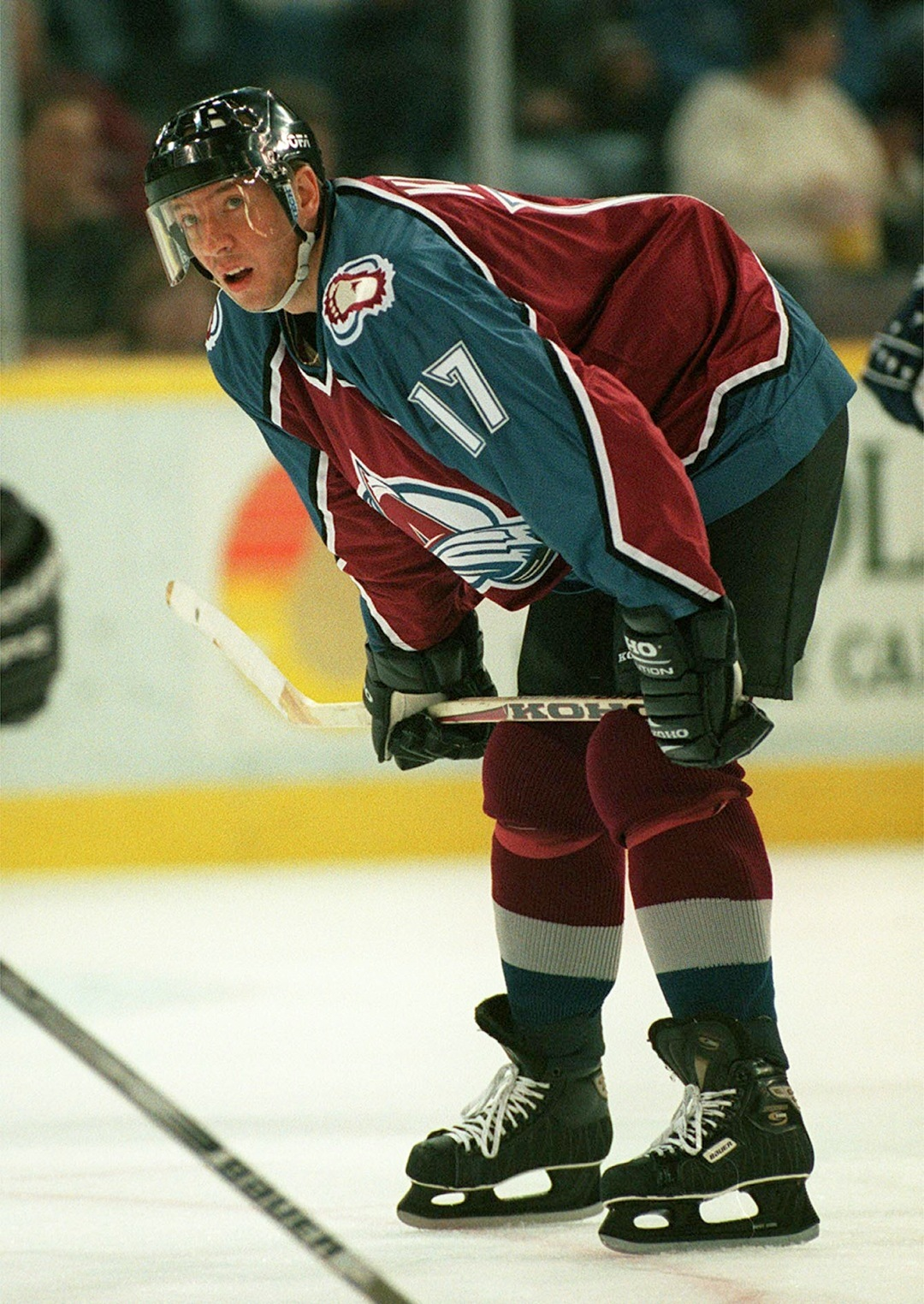
Kurri with the Avalanche in 1997

After his single season with the Mighty Ducks, Kurri was signed by the Colorado Avalanche (who had won the Stanley Cup Final a year earlier) on a one-year contract for $1.2 million in July 1997. Previously noted for playing the angles and signed to deliver defensive help on a team stacked with star scorers such as Joe Sakic, Kurri had just two goals by December. Kurri's highlight of the season was his 600th NHL career goal, which came on 23 December at McNichols Sports Arena off Los Angeles Kings goaltender Stephane Fiset at 3:21 of the first period. By the midpoint of the season, Kurri stated this would be his final season. He was named to the 1998 National Hockey League All-Star Game as a Commissioner Selection for his eighth and final All-Star selection. He played 70 games for the Avalanche and scored five goals with 17 assists with a plus-minus of 6. In the first-round matchup against the Edmonton Oilers, Kurri played 37 combined minutes with no points as the Avalanche lost the series in four games. Kurri retired as only the seventh player to play in 200 Stanley Cup playoff games.

== Legacy ==
Kurri finished his career as the highest-scoring European-born-and-trained player in NHL history, with 601 goals, 797 assists, and 1,398 points; Stan Mikita, who was born in Slovakia, but raised in Canada, retired 18 seasons before Kurri with 926 assists and 1,467 points. Jaromír Jágr set the new mark for European-born players, passing Kurri (who he labeled as his idol) and Mikita in 2006. Since the plus-minus was first recorded in the 1950s, Kurri is the all-time leader in the category for postseason play, having recorded a plus-minus of +102.

He is 22nd all-time in goals with 601 (at the time he retired, only eight other players had 600 goals). Teemu Selänne, who grew up with a picture of Kurri and Gretzky on his bedroom wall at home, passed him for the most goals by a Finnish player in 2010 and passed him in points in 2012. His 797 assists as a Finnish player is still a record for all Finnish players. Kurri finished with 233 points (106 goals, 127 assists) in the Stanley Cup playoffs, third most in NHL history. Kurri, alongside Gretzky and Mark Messier, is one of three players to record 100 goals and 100 assists each in the Stanley Cup playoffs.

He is the fourth leading point-scorer in Oilers history, with 1,043 points in 754 games, behind Gretzky, Connor McDavid, and Leon Draisaitl. On 6 October 2001, Kurri had his No. 17 retired by the Oilers in a ceremony at Skyreach Centre prior to the game versus the Phoenix Coyotes. He also has had his jersey number retired by the Finnish national team and Jokerit.

The Jari Kurri Trophy is given to the most valuable player in the SM-liiga playoffs. In 2000, he was named along with longtime linemate Gretzky to the IIHF Hall of Fame. The Hockey News ranked Kurri as among the top 50 players of the century. Referred to as "Mr. Hockey" in his native county, he was the first Finnish-born player inducted into the Hockey Hall of Fame in 2001. He was named among the 100 Greatest NHL Players in 2017.

== International play ==
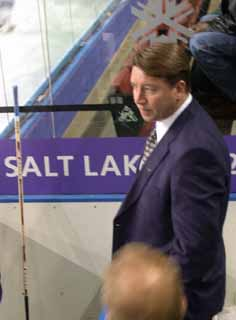
Jari Kurri looks on as the Finnish national team plays at the 2002 Winter Olympics.

Kurri also had a lengthy international career for the Finnish national team. Kurri debuted during 1980 Winter Olympics when Finland played in the Olympic ice hockey tournament. Since NHL players were unable to participate in the Olympic Games and World Championships, Kurri's national team appearances were limited after he started his NHL career. Kurri was part of the Finnish national team during 1981 Canada Cup. Finland lost four games and had a 4–4 tie with the United States. After the Oilers were eliminated in the 1982 NHL playoffs, Kurri was able to join the Finnish national team in 1982 World Championships. The tournament was held in Finland. Kurri formed Finland's top line along with SM-liiga players Reijo Leppänen of TPS and Kari Jalonen of Kärpät. The lineup led the Finnish team in points and played well during the tournament but Finland was not able to advance to the medal round. Kurri was part of the Finnish team at the 1987 Canada Cup and the 1989 World Championships, but Finland was unable to gain success in those tournaments, ranking 6th of 6 and 5th of 8, in those respective tournaments. In 1991, Kurri represented Finland at the 1991 World Championships held again in Finland. Finland ranked 5th of 8 teams. Later that year, at the 1991 Canada Cup, Finland lost 3–7 to the United States in the semi-finals. At the 1994 World Championships, Kurri managed to get his first international medal when Finland earned silver after losing 1–2 in a shootout against Canada.

At the 1998 Winter Olympics, Kurri faced Gretzky on ice for the last time, when Finland and Canada played for the Olympic bronze medal in Nagano. Finland was the underdog against Canada, but Finland won the game 3–2. Kurri scored the first goal of the game, which turned out to be his last goal for the Finnish national team.

== After retirement ==
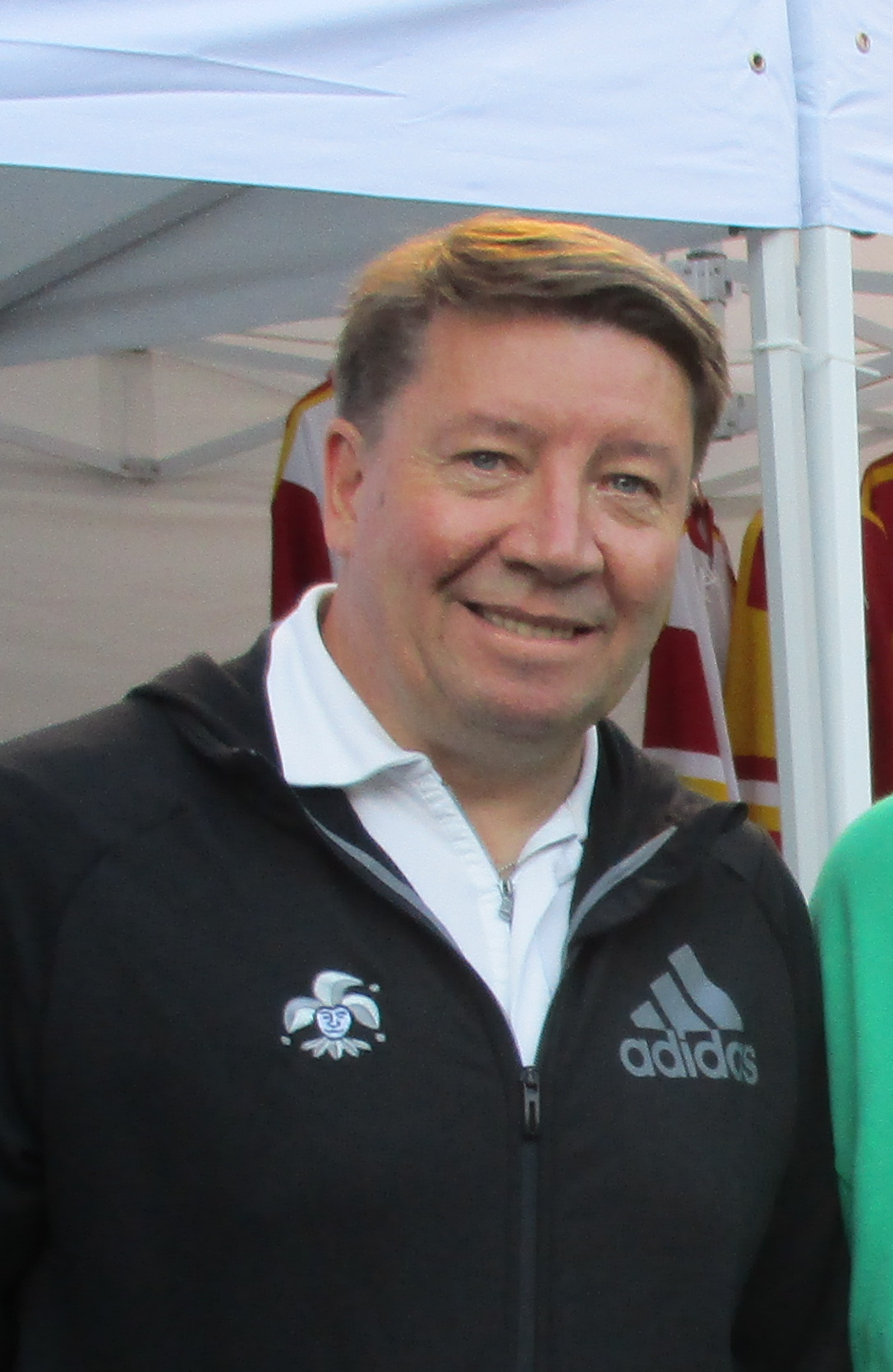
Jokerit’s general manager Jari Kurri

Kurri was the general manager of the Jokerit in 2013. In 2014, under new Russian ownership, they joined the Kontinental Hockey League in a controversial move. In the summer of 2019, Hjallis Harkimo sold the Jokerit to Kurri. In 2022, with the team facing bankruptcy and backlash from fans due to their inability to play in 2022 after departing the KHL, Kurri sold his share of the team and is no longer part of its ownership. When the team returned in 2023 to play in the Mestis and unveiled the championship banners and honored jerseys of legends, Kurri did not attend the ceremony, which saw fans display a banner reading "Jari Kurri - persona non grata". In 2024, he was awarded the Borje Salming Courage Award by the NHL Alumni Association (as given to a European NHL Alumni member), the second recipient to win the award, with Association executive director Glenn Healy stating, “Kurri's legacy is one of excellence and community spirit, mirroring the values Börje Salming cherished so much. Awarding him the Börje Salming Courage Award is a testament to his enduring influence in Finland and the dedicated path he's walked both on and off the ice."

== Personal life ==
Kurri is married to former Miss Finland, Vanessa Kurri, nee Forsman; they wed in 2004 and have three daughters: Odessa (born 2002), Alissa (born 2005), and Isla (2012), and one son, Paulus (born 2007). Kurri also has twin boys (Joonas and Ville) from his first marriage to Tiina Kurri. Former linemate Wayne Gretzky is the godfather of Kurri's children from his first marriage.

Kurri is the godfather of Sami Lepistö.

== Career statistics ==
=== Regular season and playoffs ===
Bold indicates led league
Bold italics indicate NHL record

| | | | Regular season | | | | | Playoffs |
| Season | Team | League | GP | G | A | Pts | PIM | GP | G | A | Pts | PIM |
|---|---|---|---|---|---|---|---|---|---|---|---|---|
| 1977–78 | Jokerit | FIN U20 | 5 | 5 | 4 | 9 | 2 | 1 | 1 | 0 | 1 | 2 |
| 1977–78 | Jokerit | SM-l | 29 | 2 | 9 | 11 | 12 | — | — | — | — | — |
| 1978–79 | Jokerit | FIN U20 | 2 | 1 | 1 | 2 | 2 | — | — | — | — | — |
| 1978–79 | Jokerit | SM-l | 33 | 16 | 14 | 30 | 12 | — | — | — | — | — |
| 1979–80 | Jokerit | SM-l | 33 | 23 | 16 | 39 | 22 | — | — | — | — | — |
| 1980–81 | Edmonton Oilers | NHL | 75 | 32 | 43 | 75 | 40 | 9 | 5 | 7 | 12 | 4 |
| 1981–82 | Edmonton Oilers | NHL | 71 | 32 | 54 | 86 | 32 | 5 | 2 | 5 | 7 | 10 |
| 1982–83 | Edmonton Oilers | NHL | 80 | 45 | 59 | 104 | 22 | 16 | 8 | 15 | 23 | 8 |
| 1983–84 | Edmonton Oilers | NHL | 64 | 52 | 61 | 113 | 14 | 19 | **14** | 14 | 28 | 13 |
| 1984–85 | Edmonton Oilers | NHL | 73 | 71 | 64 | 135 | 30 | 18 | **19** | 12 | 31 | 6 |
| 1985–86 | Edmonton Oilers | NHL | 78 | **68** | 63 | 131 | 22 | 10 | 2 | 10 | 12 | 4 |
| 1986–87 | Edmonton Oilers | NHL | 79 | 54 | 54 | 108 | 41 | 21 | **15** | 10 | 25 | 20 |
| 1987–88 | Edmonton Oilers | NHL | 80 | 43 | 53 | 96 | 30 | 19 | **14** | 17 | 31 | 12 |
| 1988–89 | Edmonton Oilers | NHL | 76 | 44 | 58 | 102 | 69 | 7 | 3 | 5 | 8 | 6 |
| 1989–90 | Edmonton Oilers | NHL | 78 | 33 | 60 | 93 | 48 | 22 | 10 | 15 | 25 | 18 |
| 1990–91 | Devils Milano | ITA | 30 | 27 | 48 | 75 | 6 | 10 | 10 | 12 | 22 | 2 |
| 1991–92 | Los Angeles Kings | NHL | 73 | 23 | 37 | 60 | 24 | 4 | 1 | 2 | 3 | 4 |
| 1992–93 | Los Angeles Kings | NHL | 82 | 27 | 60 | 87 | 38 | 24 | 9 | 8 | 17 | 12 |
| 1993–94 | Los Angeles Kings | NHL | 81 | 31 | 46 | 77 | 48 | — | — | — | — | — |
| 1994–95 | Jokerit | SM-l | 20 | 10 | 9 | 19 | 10 | — | — | — | — | — |
| 1994–95 | Los Angeles Kings | NHL | 38 | 10 | 19 | 29 | 24 | — | — | — | — | — |
| 1995–96 | Los Angeles Kings | NHL | 57 | 17 | 23 | 40 | 37 | — | — | — | — | — |
| 1995–96 | New York Rangers | NHL | 14 | 1 | 4 | 5 | 2 | 11 | 3 | 5 | 8 | 2 |
| 1996–97 | Mighty Ducks of Anaheim | NHL | 82 | 13 | 22 | 35 | 12 | 11 | 1 | 2 | 3 | 4 |
| 1997–98 | Colorado Avalanche | NHL | 70 | 5 | 17 | 22 | 12 | 4 | 0 | 0 | 0 | 0 |
| SM-liiga totals | | | 115 | 51 | 48 | 99 | 56 | — | — | — | — | — |
| NHL totals | | | 1,251 | 601 | 797 | 1,398 | 545 | 200 | 106 | 127 | 233 | 123 |

=== International ===
| Year | Team | Event | GP | G | A | Pts | PIM |
|---|---|---|---|---|---|---|---|
| 1978 | Finland | EJC | 4 | 6 | 2 | 8 | 4 |
| 1979 | Finland | WJC | 6 | 2 | 3 | 5 | 2 |
| 1980 | Finland | WJC | 5 | 4 | 7 | 11 | 0 |
| 1980 | Finland | OLY | 7 | 2 | 1 | 3 | 6 |
| 1981 | Finland | CC | 5 | 0 | 1 | 1 | 0 |
| 1982 | Finland | WC | 7 | 4 | 3 | 7 | 2 |
| 1987 | Finland | CC | 5 | 1 | 1 | 2 | 4 |
| 1989 | Finland | WC | 7 | 5 | 4 | 9 | 4 |
| 1991 | Finland | WC | 10 | 6 | 6 | 12 | 2 |
| 1991 | Finland | CC | 6 | 2 | 0 | 2 | 7 |
| 1994 | Finland | WC | 8 | 4 | 6 | 10 | 2 |
| 1996 | Finland | WCH | 4 | 1 | 0 | 1 | 0 |
| 1998 | Finland | OLY | 6 | 1 | 4 | 5 | 2 |
| Junior totals | | | 15 | 12 | 12 | 24 | 6 |
| Senior totals | | | 65 | 26 | 26 | 52 | 29 |

== Achievements ==
NHL

| Award | Year(s) |
|---|---|
| NHL All-Star Game | 1983, 1985, 1986, 1987, 1988, 1989, 1990, 1993, 1998 |
| Stanley Cup champion | 1984, 1985, 1987, 1988, 1990 |
| NHL First All-Star Team | 1985, 1987 |
| NHL Second All-Star Team | 1984, 1986, 1989 |
| Lady Byng Memorial Trophy | 1985 |
| NHL goal scoring leader | 1986 |
| Edmonton Oilers #17 jersey retired | 2001 |
| Hockey Hall of Fame | 2001 |

SM-Liiga

| Award | Year(s) |
|---|---|
| President's trophy | 1994–95 |
| Kanada-malja Runner-up | 1994–95 |
| Helsingin Jokerit #17 jersey retired | 2007 |

International

| Award | Year(s) |
|---|---|
| EJC All-Star Team | 1978 |
| EJC Best Forward | 1978 |
| WC, All-Star Team | 1991, 1994 |
| Italian Serie A League Bronze | 1990–91 |
| IIHF Hall of Fame | 2000 |
| IOC Athletes' Commission | 2002–2006 |

== See also ==
- 50 goals in 50 games
- List of members of the Hockey Hall of Fame
- Hockey Hall of Fame
- List of NHL statistical leaders
- List of NHL players with 1000 points
- List of NHL players with 500 goals

| Preceded by Wayne Gretzky | Maurice Richard Trophy; 1986 | Succeeded by Wayne Gretzky |
| Preceded by Mike Bossy | Winner of the Lady Byng Trophy; 1985 | Succeeded by Mike Bossy |
