= Ron Hoggarth =

Canadian ice hockey referee

Ron Hoggarth (born April 12, 1948 in Barrie, Ontario) is a Canadian retired National Hockey League referee. His career started in 1971 and ended in 1994. He officiated in 1,190 regular season games, 150 Stanley Cup playoff games and three All-Star games. On October 15, 1989, Hoggarth refereed the game in which Wayne Gretzky became the NHL's all-time leading point scorer. In a game that Hoggarth officiated on January 26, 1992, he charged Kevin Stevens, Jaromír Jágr and Mario Lemieux with Game Misconduct Penalties and threw all out of the game with less than 1 minute remaining, resulting in Lemieux calling the NHL a "Garage League".
