= 39th National Hockey League All-Star Game =

Professional ice hockey exhibition game

39th NHL All-Star Game
	1	2	3	OT	Total
Wales	1	3	1	1	6
Campbell	2	1	2	0	5
- Date: February 9, 1988
- Arena: St. Louis Arena
- City: St. Louis
- MVP: Mario Lemieux (Pittsburgh)
- Attendance: 17,878

The 39th National Hockey League All-Star Game was held in the St. Louis Arena in St. Louis, home to the St. Louis Blues, on February 9, 1988.

== Lemieux makes his mark ==
Pittsburgh Penguins' centremen Mario Lemieux recorded six points (3–3–6) and scored the game-winner in overtime to lead the Wales Conference to a thrilling 6–5 victory. Lemieux's six points broke the previous record for most points in an All-Star Game, which was previously held by six players (four points). Montreal Canadiens' leftwinger Mats Naslund earned an assist on all three of Lemieux's goals and added two more to set an All-Star Game record with five assists.

== Uniforms ==
The NHL returned to the All-Star uniform design worn before Rendez-vous '87 but replaced the conference names on the front with the NHL shield. A patch featuring the logo of the All-Star Game replaced the smaller NHL shield on the left shoulder. In addition, the block shadow typeface for the names and numerals was replaced with simple black letters and numbers, except for on the black sleeve sections of the orange jersey worn by the Wales team, where the numbers were white instead.

== Team rosters ==
	Campbell Conference	Wales Conference
Head coach	(Canada) Glen Sather (Edmonton Oilers)	(Canada) Mike Keenan (Philadelphia Flyers)
Honorary captain	(Canada) Bob Plager	(Canada) Al Arbour
Lineup	Starting lineup: (Canada) 2 - D Al MacInnis (Calgary Flames); (Canada) 4 - D Kevin Lowe (Edmonton Oilers); (Finland) 17 - RW Jari Kurri (Edmonton Oilers); (Canada) 20 - LW Luc Robitaille (Los Angeles Kings); (Canada) 31 - G Grant Fuhr (Edmonton Oilers); (Canada) 99 - C Wayne Gretzky (Edmonton Oilers), Captain; Reserves: (Canada) 3 - D Brad McCrimmon (Calgary Flames); (Canada) 5 - D Rob Ramage (St. Louis Blues); (Canada) 8 - C Greg Adams (Vancouver Canucks); (Canada) 9 - LW Glenn Anderson (Edmonton Oilers); (Canada) 10 - C Dale Hawerchuk (Winnipeg Jets, Alternate); (Canada) 11 - LW Mark Messier (Edmonton Oilers, Alternate); (Canada) 18 - C Denis Savard (Chicago Blackhawks); (Canada) 19 - C Steve Yzerman (Detroit Red Wings); (United States) 21 - D Gary Suter (Calgary Flames); (Canada) 23 - RW Brian Bellows (Minnesota North Stars); (Canada) 24 - LW Bob Probert (Detroit Red Wings); (Canada) 25 - C Joe Nieuwendyk (Calgary Flames); (Canada) 30 - G Mike Vernon (Calgary Flames); (United States) 33 - D Al Iafrate (Toronto Maple Leafs)	Starting lineup: (Canada) 7 - D Paul Coffey (Pittsburgh Penguins); (Canada) 11 - RW Kevin Dineen (Hartford Whalers); (Canada) 16 - LW Michel Goulet (Quebec Nordiques); (Canada) 27 - G Ron Hextall (Philadelphia Flyers); (Canada) 66 - C Mario Lemieux (Pittsburgh Penguins); (Canada) 77 - D Ray Bourque (Boston Bruins); Reserves: (United States) 2 - D Mark Howe (Philadelphia Flyers, Alternate); (Canada) 5 - D Denis Potvin (New York Islanders, Alternate); (Canada) 8 - RW Cam Neely (Boston Bruins); (Canada) 9 - C Kirk Muller (New Jersey Devils); (Canada) 12 - RW Mike Gartner (Washington Capitals); (United States) 15 - C Pat LaFontaine (New York Islanders); (Canada) 19 - D Larry Robinson (Montreal Canadiens), Captain; (Canada) 20 - C Dave Poulin (Philadelphia Flyers); (Finland) 21 - C Christian Ruuttu (Buffalo Sabres); (Sweden) 25 - LW Mats Naslund (Montreal Canadiens); (Czechoslovakia) 26 - C Peter Stastny (Quebec Nordiques); (Sweden) 28 - RW Tomas Sandstrom (New York Rangers); (Sweden) 29 - D Kjell Samuelsson (Philadelphia Flyers); (Canada) 33 - G Patrick Roy (Montreal Canadiens)

== Game summary ==
	Campbell Conference	Wales Conference
Final score	5	6 (OT)
First period
Scoring	Hawerchuk (Bellows, Nieuwendyk) 3:25; Gretzky (Probert) 18:46	Sandstrom (Lemieux, Naslund) 14:45
Penalties		Potvin, holding 10:11
Second period
Scoring	Robitaille (Savard, Lowe) 15:09	Gartner (Lemieux) 4:28; Stastny (Lemieux, Naslund) 10:08 (PPG); Lemieux (Naslund) 11:34
Penalties	McCrimmon, tripping 8:47	LaFontaine, tripping 7:27
Third period
Scoring	Savard (Robitaille, Anderson) 5:19; Robitaille (Anderson, Savard) 16:28	Lemieux (Naslund, Dineen) 8:07
Penalties	Bellows, hooking 2:53	
First overtime
Scoring		Lemieux (Naslund, Dineen) 1:08 (GWG)
Shots on goal	14–6–10–0–30	9–13–12–1–35
Win/loss	L - Mike Vernon	W - Patrick Roy

- Referee: Denis Morel
- Linesmen: Kevin Collins, Randy Mitton
- TV: CBC, SRC, ESPN

== See also ==
- 1987–88 NHL season

== Notes ==
- ^1Bob Plager's brother, Barclay Plager, was also named honorary captain, but he died three days before the All-Star Game from a brain hemorrhage due to a brain tumour, on February 6. A moment of silence in his honor occurred before the start of the game.
- ^2Doug Wilson was unable to start the game and was replaced by Al MacInnis in the starting lineup.
