= Ryan Bozak =

Canadian ice hockey official

Ryan Bozak (born January 3, 1947, in Swift Current, Saskatchewan) is a retired National Hockey League linesman. His career started in 1972 and ended in 1994. During his career, he officiated 1,528 regular season games and two All-Star games. Ryan is the son of Billy Bozak, who was trainer of the San Diego Gulls and eventually the Winnipeg Jets.

== General references ==
- The National Hockey League Official Guide & Record Book 1993-94 ISBN 1-880141-43-4
