= 1988 Stanley Cup playoffs =

Ice hockey playoffs

Tournament details
- Dates: April 6–May 26, 1988
- Teams: 16
- Defending champions: Edmonton Oilers

Final positions
- Champions: Edmonton Oilers
- Runners-up: Boston Bruins

Tournament statistics
- Scoring leader(s): Wayne Gretzky (Oilers) (43 points)

Awards
- MVP: Wayne Gretzky (Oilers)

The 1988 Stanley Cup playoffs, the playoff tournament of the National Hockey League (NHL), began on April 6, after the conclusion of the 1987–88 NHL season. It concluded on May 26, with the defending champion Edmonton Oilers defeating the Boston Bruins to win their second straight Stanley Cup and fourth in five years.

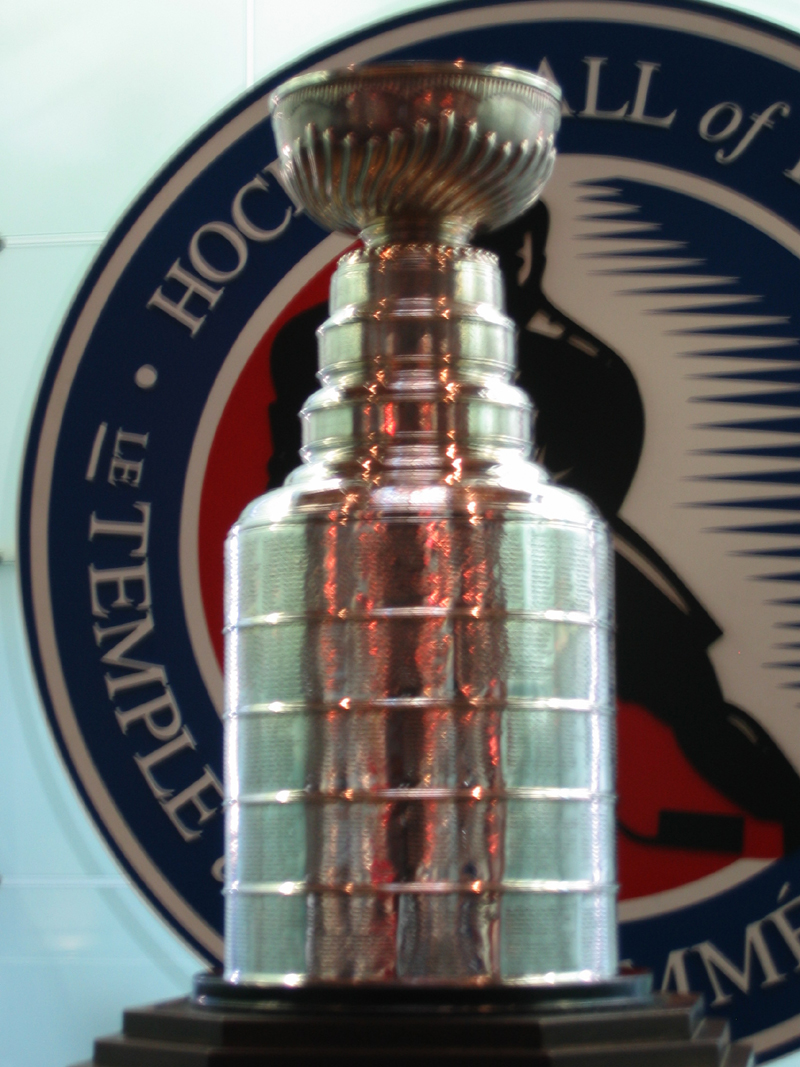
The Stanley Cup

The Presidents' Trophy winning Calgary Flames had home ice advantage during the playoffs thanks in part to Edmonton's struggles without Wayne Gretzky, who missed 16 games due to injury. The Oilers, who had won the Cup in three of the previous four seasons, were still thought to have a good chance at repeating with Gretzky's return. The clash between the Flames and Oilers in the Smythe Division Final was highly anticipated.

The New Jersey Devils made the playoffs for the first time since their move from Denver, winning in overtime at Chicago Stadium on the season's final day to edge the New York Rangers for the Patrick Division's fourth spot. This was only the second time they made the playoffs including their Colorado and Kansas City days.

The 1988 playoffs most notable moment was the cancellation of game four of the finals in Boston after fog issues, a result of high heat and the subsequent building power outage resulted in the game being canceled outright with the result not counting, yet the league retained player stats from the game. The series would move directly on to Edmonton. Gretzky would go on to set NHL playoff records with 31 assists in 18 games and 13 points in the Stanley Cup Finals. Since the expansion of each playoff round to a best-of-seven games in 1987, Edmonton holds the record for needing the fewest playoff games (18) to win the Stanley Cup and most consecutive home wins in one playoff year (11).

== Playoff seeds ==
The top four teams in each division qualified for the playoffs, as follows:

=== Prince of Wales Conference ===
==== Adams Division ====
1. Montreal Canadiens, Adams Division champions, Prince of Wales Conference regular season champions – 103 points
2. Boston Bruins – 94 points
3. Buffalo Sabres – 85 points
4. Hartford Whalers – 77 points

==== Patrick Division ====
1. New York Islanders, Patrick Division champions – 88 points
2. Washington Capitals – 85 points (38 wins, 9 points head-to-head vs. Philadelphia)
3. Philadelphia Flyers – 85 points (38 wins, 5 points head-to-head vs. Washington)
4. New Jersey Devils – 82 points (38 wins)

=== Clarence Campbell Conference ===
==== Norris Division ====
1. Detroit Red Wings, Norris Division champions – 93 points
2. St. Louis Blues – 76 points
3. Chicago Blackhawks – 69 points
4. Toronto Maple Leafs – 52 points (the lowest point total for any playoff qualifier, minimum 70 games played)

==== Smythe Division ====
1. Calgary Flames, Smythe Division champions, Clarence Campbell Conference regular season champions, Presidents' Trophy winners – 105 points
2. Edmonton Oilers – 99 points
3. Winnipeg Jets – 77 points
4. Los Angeles Kings – 68 points

== Playoff bracket ==
In the division semifinals, the fourth seeded team in each division played against the division winner from their division. The other series matched the second and third place teams from the divisions. The two winning teams from each division's semifinals then met in the division finals. The two division winners of each conference then played in the conference finals. The two conference winners then advanced to the Stanley Cup Finals.

In each round, teams competed in a best-of-seven series following a 2–2–1–1–1 format (scores in the bracket indicate the number of games won in each best-of-seven series). Home ice advantage was awarded to the team that had the better regular season record, and played at home for games one and two (and games five and seven, if necessary); the other team then played at home for games three and four (and game six, if necessary).

An exception to the 2–2–1–1–1 format was made during this year's Stanley Cup Finals after a power outage forced the cancellation of the original game four (see below).

Division semifinals	Division finals
A1	Montreal	4
A4	Hartford	2
A1	Montreal	1
A2	Boston	4
A2	Boston	4
A3	Buffalo	2
Prince of Wales Conference
P1	NY Islanders	2
P4	New Jersey	4
P4	New Jersey	4
P2	Washington	3
P2	Washington	4
P3	Philadelphia	3
N1	Detroit	4
N4	Toronto	2
N1	Detroit	4
N2	St. Louis	1
N2	St. Louis	4
N3	Chicago	1
Clarence Campbell Conference
S1	Calgary	4
S4	Los Angeles	1
S1	Calgary	0
S2	Edmonton	4
S2	Edmonton	4
S3	Winnipeg	1

Conference finals
A2	Boston	4
P4	New Jersey	3
N1	Detroit	1
S2	Edmonton	4

Stanley Cup Finals
A2	Boston	0
S2	Edmonton	4

== Division semifinals ==
=== Prince of Wales Conference ===
==== (A1) Montreal Canadiens vs. (A4) Hartford Whalers ====
This was the third playoff series between these two teams. Montreal won both previous meetings, including their most recent meeting in seven games in the 1986 Adams Division Finals. Montreal was the best team in the Wales Conference during the regular season.

April 6	Hartford Whalers	3–4	Montreal Canadiens	Montreal Forum	Recap
Randy Ladouceur (1) – 07:59		First period	No scoring
No scoring		Second period	02:54 – Shayne Corson (1); 04:48 – Bobby Smith (1)
Dave Babych (1) – 00:56; Ron Francis (1) – pp – 03:10		Third period	05:43 – pp – Chris Chelios (1); 09:50 – Stephane Richer (1)
Mike Liut 22 saves / 24 shots Richard Brodeur 9 saves / 11 shots		Goalie stats	Patrick Roy 21 saves / 24 shots

April 7	Hartford Whalers	3–7	Montreal Canadiens	Montreal Forum	Recap
Lindsay Carson (1) – 09:47; Kevin Dineen (1) – 14:15		First period	05:30 – Brian Skrudland (1); 13:37 – Chris Chelios (2)
Scot Kleinendorst (1) – 12:52		Second period	02:39 – Gilles Thibaudeau (1); 10:59 – Claude Lemieux (1)
No scoring		Third period	09:05 – Bobby Smith (2); 10:55 – Gilles Thibaudeau (2); 11:43 – Kjell Dahlin (1)
Richard Brodeur 21 saves / 28 shots		Goalie stats	Patrick Roy 28 saves / 31 shots

April 9	Montreal Canadiens	4–3	Hartford Whalers	Hartford Civic Center	Recap
Stephane Richer (2) – pp – 09:21		First period	02:06 – Stew Gavin (1)
Craig Ludwig (1) – 08:33; Mike McPhee (1) – 09:32; Ryan Walter (1) – pp – 13:52		Second period	06:31 – pp – Sylvain Cote (1)
No scoring		Third period	06:34 – pp – Carey Wilson (1)
Patrick Roy 30 saves / 33 shots		Goalie stats	Mike Liut 23 saves / 27 shots

April 10	Montreal Canadiens	5–7	Hartford Whalers	Hartford Civic Center	Recap
Stephane Richer (3) – 03:22		First period	04:17 – Dean Evason (1); 08:29 – Dave Babych (2)
Stephane Richer (4) – 13:17		Second period	No scoring
Bobby Smith (3) – pp – 04:06; Ryan Walter (2) – pp – 05:02; Gilles Thibaudeau (3) – pp – 19:30		Third period	00:59 – Dave Babych (3); 11:20 – Kevin Dineen (2); 14:23 – Stew Gavin (2); 17:05 – pp – Kevin Dineen (3); 17:54 – Scott Young (1)
Patrick Roy 36 saves / 43 shots		Goalie stats	Mike Liut 26 saves / 31 shots

April 12	Hartford Whalers	3–1	Montreal Canadiens	Montreal Forum	Recap
Kevin Dineen (4) – 10:01		First period	No scoring
Carey Wilson (2) – 05:40		Second period	06:11 – Mike McPhee (2)
Ron Francis (2) – en – 19:44		Third period	No scoring
Richard Brodeur 22 saves / 23 shots		Goalie stats	Brian Hayward 26 saves / 28 shots

April 14	Montreal Canadiens	2–1	Hartford Whalers	Hartford Civic Center	Recap
Stephane Richer (5) – 09:15; Stephane Richer (6) – 17:59		First period	No scoring
No scoring		Second period	18:57 – pp – Ray Ferraro (1)
No scoring		Third period	No scoring
Brian Hayward 19 saves / 20 shots		Goalie stats	Richard Brodeur 23 saves / 25 shots

Montreal won series 4–2

==== (A2) Boston Bruins vs (A3) Buffalo Sabres ====
This was the third playoff series between these two teams. Boston won both prior meetings. They last met in the 1983 Adams Division Finals, in which Boston won in seven games.

April 6	Buffalo Sabres	3–7	Boston Bruins	Boston Garden	Recap
Phil Housley (1) – pp – 11:16		First period	09:27 – pp – Glen Wesley (1)
Pierre Turgeon (1) – pp – 14:43		Second period	03:16 – Ray Bourque (1); 11:38 – sh – Steve Kasper (1); 12:35 – sh – Gord Kluzak (1)
Pierre Turgeon (2) – pp – 16:14		Third period	03:27 – Tom McCarthy (1); 03:55 – Bob Sweeney (1); 08:45 – Michael Thelven (1)
Tom Barrasso 22 saves / 28 shots Daren Puppa 3 saves / 4 shots		Goalie stats	Rejean Lemelin 21 saves / 24 shots

April 7	Buffalo Sabres	1–4	Boston Bruins	Boston Garden	Recap
No scoring		First period	12:19 – pp – Ken Linseman (1)
No scoring		Second period	02:13 – Bruce Shoebottom (1)
Mike Foligno (1) – 04:16		Third period	05:35 – pp – Glen Wesley (1); 09:38 – pp – Craig Janney (1)
Tom Barrasso 33 saves / 37 shots		Goalie stats	Rejean Lemelin 25 saves / 26 shots

April 9	Boston Bruins	2–6	Buffalo Sabres	Buffalo Memorial Auditorium	Recap
Craig Janney (2) – 14:48		First period	09:16 – pp – John Tucker (1)
Glen Wesley (1) – pp – 10:58		Second period	06:15 – Mike Foligno (2); 17:37 – John Tucker (2); 18:39 – John Tucker (3)
No scoring		Third period	09:14 – pp – John Tucker (4); 14:01 – Mike Foligno (3)
Andy Moog 24 saves / 30 shots		Goalie stats	Tom Barrasso 22 saves / 24 shots

April 10	Boston Bruins	5–6	OT	Buffalo Sabres	Buffalo Memorial Auditorium	Recap
Bob Joyce (1) – 07:33		First period		02:29 – pp – Pierre Turgeon (3)
Keith Crowder (1) – 03:36		Second period		16:33 – Dave Andreychuk (1)
Rick Middleton (1) – 11:58; Cam Neely (1) – 13:48; Cam Neely (2) – 18:27		Third period		00:16 – pp – John Tucker (5); 07:33 – Pierre Turgeon (4); 14:01 – Phil Housley (2)
No scoring		First overtime period		05:32 – pp – John Tucker (6)
Rejean Lemelin 31 saves / 37 shots		Goalie stats		Daren Puppa 26 saves / 31 shots

April 12	Buffalo Sabres	4–5	Boston Bruins	Boston Garden	Recap
No scoring		First period	01:58 – Steve Kasper (2); 12:28 – sh – Rick Middleton (2)
Christian Ruuttu (1) – pp – 00:54; Dave Andreychuk (2) – pp – 06:42		Second period	No scoring
John Tucker (7) – 11:13; Ray Sheppard (1) – pp – 16:58		Third period	01:10 – Ken Linseman (2); 06:05 – Tom McCarthy (2); 14:16 – Rick Middleton (3)
Daren Puppa 27 saves / 32 shots		Goalie stats	Rejean Lemelin 18 saves / 22 shots

April 14	Boston Bruins	5–2	Buffalo Sabres	Buffalo Memorial Auditorium	Recap
Bob Sweeney (2) – 06:28; Bob Joyce (2) – pp – 13:13; Willi Plett (1) – 13:40		First period	No scoring
Ken Linseman (3) – 12:19		Second period	00:44 – Mikael Andersson (1)
Ken Linseman (4) – en – 19:26		Third period	11:31 – Christian Ruuttu (2)
Andy Moog 22 saves / 24 shots		Goalie stats	Tom Barrasso 26 saves / 30 shots

Boston won series 4–2

==== (P1) New York Islanders vs. (P4) New Jersey Devils ====
This was the first and to date only playoff series between these two teams. This was the first time that a team representing the state of New Jersey qualified for the Stanley Cup playoffs. This was the first ever playoff series victory for the Scouts/Rockies/Devils franchise. This would be the last playoff series until the 2019 Eastern Conference First Round that the Islanders held home-ice advantage.

April 6	New Jersey Devils	3–4	OT	New York Islanders	Nassau Coliseum	Recap
No scoring		First period		05:44 – pp – Mikko Mäkelä (1)
Craig Wolanin (1) – 07:49		Second period		01:09 – pp – Denis Potvin (1)
David Maley (1) – 12:05; John MacLean (1) – pp – 18:04		Third period		06:58 – pp – Pat LaFontaine (1)
No scoring		First overtime period		06:11 – Pat LaFontaine (2)
Sean Burke 29 saves / 33 shots		Goalie stats		Kelly Hrudey 28 saves / 31 shots

April 7	New Jersey Devils	3–2	New York Islanders	Nassau Coliseum	Recap
No scoring		First period	No scoring
John MacLean (2) – 09:22; Claude Loiselle (1) – sh – 16:17		Second period	06:25 – Tomas Jonsson (1)
Mark Johnson (1) – pp – 05:56		Third period	04:19 – pp – Gerald Diduck (1)
Bob Sauve 24 saves / 26 shots		Goalie stats	Kelly Hrudey 13 saves / 16 shots

April 9	New York Islanders	0–3	New Jersey Devils	Brendan Byrne Arena	Recap
No scoring		First period	No scoring
No scoring		Second period	06:21 – Ken Daneyko (1); 18:33 – Mark Johnson (2)
No scoring		Third period	04:28 – Mark Johnson (3)
Kelly Hrudey 14 saves / 17 shots		Goalie stats	Sean Burke 31 saves / 31 shots

April 10	New York Islanders	5–4	OT	New Jersey Devils	Brendan Byrne Arena	Recap
No scoring		First period		07:52 – pp – Bruce Driver (1); 12:40 – pp – John MacLean (3)
Alan Kerr (1) – 18:49		Second period		16:50 – Doug Brown (1)
Brent Sutter (1) – 11:30; Brad Lauer (1) – 14:53; Pat LaFontaine (3) – 18:30		Third period		19:48 – John MacLean (4)
Brent Sutter (2) – sh – 15:07		First overtime period		No scoring
Kelly Hrudey 24 saves / 28 shots		Goalie stats		Sean Burke 33 saves / 38 shots

April 12	New Jersey Devils	4–2	New York Islanders	Nassau Coliseum	Recap
Bruce Driver (2) – pp – 05:40		First period	08:10 – Pat LaFontaine (4)
Craig Wolanin (2) – pp – 03:26; Pat Conacher (1) – sh – 13:12; Aaron Broten (1) – 17:40		Second period	13:44 – pp – Tomas Jonsson (2)
No scoring		Third period	No scoring
Sean Burke 33 saves / 35 shots		Goalie stats	Kelly Hrudey 26 saves / 30 shots

April 14	New York Islanders	5–6	New Jersey Devils	Brendan Byrne Arena	Recap
No scoring		First period	08:41 – sh – Doug Brown (2); 19:54 – pp – Pat Verbeek (1)
Brad Lauer (2) – 04:03		Second period	02:16 – pp – Mark Johnson (4); 06:22 – pp – Bruce Driver (3); 12:23 – Patrik Sundstrom (1)
Dale Henry (1) – sh – 07:38; Steve Konroyd (1) – sh – 08:46; Brad Lauer (3) – 10:04; Randy Wood (1) – 12:40		Third period	06:18 – pp – Patrik Sundstrom (2)
Kelly Hrudey 26 saves / 32 shots		Goalie stats	Sean Burke 22 saves / 27 shots

New Jersey won series 4–2

==== (P2) Washington Capitals vs. (P3) Philadelphia Flyers ====
This was the second playoff series between these two teams. Washington won the only previous meeting in a three-game sweep in the 1984 Patrick Division Semifinals.

Washington overcame a 3–1 series deficit to advance to the Patrick Division Finals for the third time in five years. Game seven ended when Dale Hunter scored at 5:57 of the first overtime period to complete the Capitals' comeback.

April 6	Philadelphia Flyers	4–2	Washington Capitals	Capital Centre	Recap
Peter Zezel (1) – 05:17		First period	No scoring
Peter Zezel (2) – 05:11		Second period	12:05 – pp – Michal Pivonka (1)
Dave Poulin (1) – pp – 09:21; Murray Craven (1) – en – 19:42		Third period	05:27 – pp – Dale Hunter (1)
Ron Hextall 35 saves / 37 shots		Goalie stats	Pete Peeters 27 saves / 30 shots

April 7	Philadelphia Flyers	4–5	Washington Capitals	Capital Centre	Recap
Mark Howe (1) – 05:32; Dave Brown (1) – 07:59		First period	00:47 – Kevin Hatcher (1); 18:36 – Bobby Gould (1)
Peter Zezel (3) – 10:49		Second period	11:10 – Stephen Leach (1); 18:06 – sh – Peter Sundstrom (1)
Brian Propp (1) – 15:55		Third period	06:12 – Kelly Miller (1)
Ron Hextall 23 saves / 28 shots		Goalie stats	Pete Peeters 31 saves / 35 shots

April 9	Washington Capitals	3–4	Philadelphia Flyers	Spectrum	Recap
Dale Hunter (2) – 11:49; Bengt-Ake Gustafsson (1) – pp – 16:30		First period	00:40 – Brian Propp (2)
Kevin Hatcher (2) – 14:10		Second period	03:08 – pp – Ilkka Sinisalo (1); 12:12 – Dave Poulin (2); 15:26 – Kjell Samuelsson (1)
No scoring		Third period	No scoring
Pete Peeters 25 saves / 29 shots		Goalie stats	Ron Hextall 14 saves / 17 shots

April 10	Washington Capitals	4–5	OT	Philadelphia Flyers	Spectrum	Recap
Michal Pivonka (2) – 13:06; Bengt-Ake Gustafsson (2) – 18:36		First period		09:04 – Ilkka Sinisalo (2)
No scoring		Second period		No scoring
Mike Gartner (1) – 00:55; Dale Hunter (3) – 03:04		Third period		10:53 – Mark Howe (2); 15:08 – Brian Propp (3); 19:07 – Kjell Samuelsson (2)
No scoring		First overtime period		01:18 – Murray Craven (2)
Clint Malarchuk 25 saves / 30 shots		Goalie stats		Ron Hextall 18 saves / 22 shots Mark Laforest 4 saves / 4 shots

April 12	Philadelphia Flyers	2–5	Washington Capitals	Capital Centre	Recap
Ilkka Sinisalo (3) – 14:09		First period	10:50 – Mike Ridley (1); 11:26 – Bengt-Ake Gustafsson (3)
Doug Crossman (1) – pp – 10:48		Second period	05:19 – Kevin Hatcher (3); 09:00 – sh – Bobby Gould (2); 17:10 – Michal Pivonka (3)
No scoring		Third period	No scoring
Ron Hextall 20 saves / 24 shots Mark Laforest 7 saves / 8 shots		Goalie stats	Pete Peeters 31 saves / 33 shots

April 14	Washington Capitals	7–2	Philadelphia Flyers	Spectrum	Recap
Mike Ridley (2) – pp – 05:12		First period	No scoring
Dave Christian (1) – 00:25; Bengt-Ake Gustafsson (4) – pp – 02:39; Kevin Hatcher (4) – pp – 03:17; Michal Pivonka (4) – pp – 16:10		Second period	12:44 – Ilkka Sinisalo (4); 17:17 – pp – Rick Tocchet (1)
Bobby Gould (3) – sh – 02:37; Kelly Miller (2) – 10:02		Third period	No scoring
Pete Peeters 24 saves / 26 shots		Goalie stats	Ron Hextall 21 saves / 28 shots

April 16	Philadelphia Flyers	4–5	OT	Washington Capitals	Capital Centre	Recap
Tim Kerr (1) – pp – 17:36		First period		No scoring
Brian Propp (4) – 01:35; Mark Howe (3) – 02:59		Second period		06:42 – Garry Galley (1); 08:02 – Kelly Miller (3); 17:54 – Kevin Hatcher (5)
Brad Marsh (1) – 06:21		Third period		05:19 – pp – Dale Hunter (4)
No scoring		First overtime period		05:57 – Dale Hunter (5)
Ron Hextall 35 saves / 40 shots		Goalie stats		Pete Peeters 29 saves / 33 shots

Washington won series 4–3

=== Clarence Campbell Conference ===
==== (N1) Detroit Red Wings vs. (N4) Toronto Maple Leafs ====
This was the 22nd playoff series between these two teams. Toronto led 11–10 in previous playoff meetings. This was a rematch of the previous year's Norris Division Finals, which Detroit won in seven games.

Game six in Maple Leaf Gardens was future Hall of Famer Borje Salming's final playoff game in the NHL.

April 6	Toronto Maple Leafs	6–2	Detroit Red Wings	Joe Louis Arena	Recap
Gary Leeman (1) – pp – 04:38; Borje Salming (1) – 14:31		First period	No scoring
No scoring		Second period	06:52 – Adam Oates (1)
Mark Osborne (1) – 07:35; Eddie Olczyk (1) – 10:04; Gary Leeman (2) – pp – 16:43; Al Iafrate (1) – 17:41		Third period	08:35 – pp – Lee Norwood (1)
Allan Bester 25 saves / 27 shots		Goalie stats	Glen Hanlon 18 saves / 24 shots

April 7	Toronto Maple Leafs	2–6	Detroit Red Wings	Joe Louis Arena	Recap
Russ Courtnall (1) – 05:43; Eddie Olczyk (2) – 07:54		First period	03:57 – pp – Gerard Gallant (1); 04:22 – Petr Klima (1); 07:31 – Petr Klima (2); 10:22 – Doug Halward (1)
No scoring		Second period	17:39 – pp – Petr Kilma (3)
No scoring		Third period	05:43 – James Nill (1)
Allan Bester 6 saves / 9 shots Ken Wregget 21 saves / 24 shots		Goalie stats	Glen Hanlon 21 saves / 23 shots

April 9	Detroit Red Wings	6–3	Toronto Maple Leafs	Maple Leaf Gardens	Recap
Bob Probert (1) – 01:44; James Nill (2) – sh – 05:16		First period	17:29 – Mike Blaisdell (1)
Adam Oates (2) – pp – 03:57; Petr Klima (4) – 15:30; James Nill (3) – 16:52; Petr Kilma (5) – sh – 19:36		Second period	05:16 – Russ Courtnall (2)
No scoring		Third period	02:25 – Al Secord (1)
Greg Stefan 32 saves / 35 shots		Goalie stats	Allan Bester 29 saves / 35 shots

April 10	Detroit Red Wings	8–0	Toronto Maple Leafs	Maple Leaf Gardens	Recap
Adam Oates (3) – pp – 09:33; Dave Barr (1) – pp – 14:59		First period	No scoring
Gerard Gallant (2) – 12:06; John Chabot (1) – 15:15; James Nill (4) – 17:11		Second period	No scoring
Bob Probert (2) – 03:16; James Nill (5) – 04:42; Brent Ashton (1) – 05:08		Third period	No scoring
Glen Hanlon 21 saves / 21 shots		Goalie stats	Ken Wregget 30 saves / 38 shots

April 12	Toronto Maple Leafs	6–5	OT	Detroit Red Wings	Joe Louis Arena	Recap
Eddie Olczyk (3) – sh – 03:44; Daniel Marois (1) – 12:28		First period		04:31 – Mel Bridgman (1); 07:53 – Adam Oates (4)
Al Iafrate (2) – pp – 05:30; Eddie Olczyk (4) – pp – 09:57; Tom Fergus (1) – 19:59		Second period		11:29 – pp – Adam Oates (5); 12:04 – Petr Klima (6)
No scoring		Third period		03:19 – pp – John Chabot (2)
Eddie Olczyk (5) – 00:34		First overtime period		No scoring
Allan Bester 31 saves / 36 shots		Goalie stats		Greg Stefan 13 saves / 16 shots Glen Hanlon 4 saves / 7 shots

April 14	Detroit Red Wings	5–3	Toronto Maple Leafs	Maple Leaf Gardens	Recap
Mel Bridgman (2) – 06:16; Bob Probert (3) – pp – 09:34		First period	03:39 – pp – Al Iafrate (3)
Dave Barr (2) – pp – 14:29		Second period	No scoring
Shawn Burr (1) – 00:40; Darren Veitch (1) – pp – 07:27		Third period	06:37 – sh – Tom Fergus (2); 15:59 – pp – Todd Gill (1)
Greg Stefan 20 saves / 22 shots Sam St. Laurent 6 saves / 7 shots		Goalie stats	Allan Bester 23 saves / 28 shots

Detroit won series 4–2

==== (N2) St. Louis Blues vs. (N3) Chicago Blackhawks ====
This was the fifth playoff series between the Blackhawks and Blues. Chicago won all four previous meetings, including their most recent meeting 3–1 in the 1983 Norris Division Semifinals.

April 6	Chicago Blackhawks	1–4	St. Louis Blues	St. Louis Arena	Recap
No scoring		First period	12:52 – pp – Gino Cavallini (1)
No scoring		Second period	16:32 – pp – Brett Hull (1)
Troy Murray (1) – pp – 16:45		Third period	03:00 – Gordie Roberts (1); 07:04 – pp – Brett Hull (2)
Darren Pang 20 saves / 24 shots		Goalie stats	Greg Millen 25 saves / 26 shots

April 7	Chicago Blackhawks	2–3	St. Louis Blues	St. Louis Arena	Recap
Dirk Graham (1) – 14:09		First period	13:34 – pp – Greg Paslawski (1); 19:27 – Doug Gilmour (1)
Rick Vaive (1) – pp – 10:42		Second period	No scoring
No scoring		Third period	03:09 – Brett Hull (3)
Bob Mason 28 saves / 31 shots		Goalie stats	Greg Millen 21 saves / 23 shots

April 9	St. Louis Blues	3–6	Chicago Blackhawks	Chicago Stadium	Recap
No scoring		First period	04:51 – pp – Rick Vaive (2); 05:16 – Steve Thomas (1); 16:13 – Denis Savard (1)
Bernie Federko (1) – pp – 00:17; Gaston Gingras (1) – 13:48		Second period	04:15 – Denis Savard (2); 16:39 – pp – Bob Murray (1)
Paul Cavallini (1) – sh – 18:12		Third period	07:24 – Denis Savard (3)
Greg Millen 23 saves / 29 shots		Goalie stats	Darren Pang 42 saves / 45 shots

April 10	St. Louis Blues	6–5	Chicago Blackhawks	Chicago Stadium	Recap
Tony Hrkac (1) – 02:47		First period	04:51 – pp – Steve Larmer (1); 06:39 – Everett Sanipass (1)
Brett Hull (4) – 11:08; Doug Gilmour (2) – pp – 14:13; Tony Hrkac (2) – pp – 19:55		Second period	07:21 – pp – Rick Vaive (3); 16:48 – Everett Sanipass (2)
Tony Hrkac (3) – 05:54; Tony Hrkac (4) – sh – 15:15		Third period	01:11 – pp – Rick Vaive (4)
Greg Millen 29 saves / 34 shots		Goalie stats	Darren Pang 29 saves / 35 shots

April 12	Chicago Blackhawks	3–5	St. Louis Blues	St. Louis Arena	Recap
Denis Savard (4) – sh – 09:52		First period	07:54 – pp – Brian Benning (1); 11:22 – pp – Tony Hrkac (5); 17:06 – pp – Brett Hull (5)
Rick Vaive (5) – 13:27; Rick Vaive (6) – pp – 14:36		Second period	No scoring
No scoring		Third period	00:15 – Brett Hull (6); 08:13 – Gino Cavallini (2)
Darren Pang 21 saves / 26 shots		Goalie stats	Greg Millen 18 saves / 21 shots

St. Louis won series 4–1

==== (S1) Calgary Flames vs. (S4) Los Angeles Kings ====
This was the third playoff series between these two teams, but the first since the Flames relocated from Atlanta. Los Angeles won both previous meetings, including their most recent meeting 2–1 in the 1977 Preliminary Round.

April 6	Los Angeles Kings	2–9	Calgary Flames	Olympic Saddledome	Recap
No scoring		First period	06:00 – Lanny McDonald (1); 08:07 – Al MacInnis (1); 09:36 – Joel Otto (1); 14:42 – pp – Hakan Loob (1)
Jimmy Carson (1) – 07:21; Dave Taylor (1) – pp – 14:49		Second period	02:54 – Joel Otto (2); 10:37 – Joe Mullen (1)
No scoring		Third period	10:07 – pp – Joe Nieuwendyk (1); 13:19 – Gary Roberts (1); 15:02 – Hakan Loob (2)
Roland Melanson 41 saves / 50 shots		Goalie stats	Mike Vernon 15 saves / 17 shots

April 7	Los Angeles Kings	4–6	Calgary Flames	Olympic Saddledome	Recap
Dave Taylor (2) – pp – 15:13		First period	05:06 – pp – Paul Reinhart (1); 09:49 – Joe Mullen (2)
Jimmy Carson (2) – 15:34; Chris Kontos (1) – 19:17		Second period	03:24 – pp – Joel Otto (3); 04:45 – Tim Hunter (1)
Paul Fenton (1) – 16:47		Third period	09:33 – pp – John Tonelli (1); 19:26 – sh – en – Gary Suter (1)
Glenn Healy 29 saves / 34 shots		Goalie stats	Mike Vernon 23 saves / 27 shots

April 9	Calgary Flames	2–5	Los Angeles Kings	The Forum	Recap
Colin Patterson (1) – sh – 13:58		First period	12:42 – Jimmy Carson (3)
No scoring		Second period	04:38 – pp – Bernie Nicholls (1); 15:15 – pp – Luc Robitaille (1)
Dana Murzyn (1) – 07:31		Third period	00:46 – Bobby Carpenter (1); 14:08 – pp – Jimmy Carson (4)
Mike Vernon 21 saves / 26 shots		Goalie stats	Glenn Healy 28 saves / 30 shots

April 10	Calgary Flames	7–3	Los Angeles Kings	The Forum	Recap
Hakan Loob (3) – sh – 01:29; Brad McCrimmon (1) – pp – 04:56; Gary Roberts (2) – 10:50		First period	12:13 – Dave Taylor (3); 13:10 – pp – Luc Robitaille (2)
Tim Hunter (2) – 14:35; Hakan Loob (4) – 16:05		Second period	08:12 – pp – Steve Duchesne (1)
Lanny McDonald (2) – 00:19; Hakan Loob (5) – 08:41		Third period	No scoring
Mike Vernon 22 saves / 25 shots		Goalie stats	Glenn Healy 27 saves / 34 shots

April 12	Los Angeles Kings	4–6	Calgary Flames	Olympic Saddledome	Recap
Jay Wells (1) – 11:06		First period	04:01 – pp – Hakan Loob (6); 18:22 – pp – Al MacInnis (2)
Bernie Nicholls (2) – 02:45		Second period	03:38 – Paul Reinhart (2)
Paul Fenton (2) – pp – 16:10; Jimmy Carson (5) – 18:18		Third period	01:57 – Hakan Loob (7); 02:32 – Tim Hunter (3); 09:03 – Ric Nattress (1)
Glenn Healy 23 saves / 29 shots		Goalie stats	Mike Vernon 26 saves / 30 shots

Calgary won series 4–1

==== (S2) Edmonton Oilers vs. (S3) Winnipeg Jets ====
This was the fifth playoff series between the Jets and Oilers. Edmonton won all four previous meetings. This was a rematch of the previous year's Smythe Division Finals, which Edmonton won in a four-game sweep. In Game 3, the Jets snapped a 16-game playoff losing streak to the Oilers.

April 6	Winnipeg Jets	4–7	Edmonton Oilers	Northlands Coliseum	Recap
Dale Hawerchuk (1) – pp – 06:29		First period	17:56 – Mark Messier (1)
Steve Rooney (1) – 19:12		Second period	No scoring
Ray Neufeld (1) – 01:55; Doug Smail (1) – 18:33		Third period	00:27 – pp – Glenn Anderson (1); 04:09 – Jari Kurri (1); 06:10 – Glenn Anderson (2); 06:20 – Craig Simpson (1); 13:39 – pp – Charlie Huddy (1); 14:47 – Glenn Anderson (3)
Daniel Berthiaume 26 saves / 33 shots		Goalie stats	Grant Fuhr 22 saves / 26 shots

April 7	Winnipeg Jets	2–3	Edmonton Oilers	Northlands Coliseum	Recap
No scoring		First period	05:26 – pp – Esa Tikkanen (1)
Peter Taglianetti (1) – 02:23; Paul MacLean (1) – pp – 14:44		Second period	12:49 – Kevin McClelland (1)
No scoring		Third period	18:55 – Craig Simpson (2)
Daniel Berthiaume 30 saves / 33 shots		Goalie stats	Grant Fuhr 21 saves / 23 shots

April 9	Edmonton Oilers	4–6	Winnipeg Jets	Winnipeg Arena	Recap
No scoring		First period	07:30 – Fredrik Olausson (1); 09:44 – pp – Thomas Steen (1); 18:00 – sh – Andrew McBain (1)
Normand Lacombe (1) – 04:28; Craig Simpson (3) – 07:26; Mark Messier (2) – sh – 08:46; Mike Krushelnyski (1) – 13:58		Second period	09:54 – pp – Ray Neufeld (2); 13:22 – sh – Randy Gilhen (1)
No scoring		Third period	19:23 – en – Laurie Boschman (1)
Grant Fuhr 28 saves / 33 shots		Goalie stats	Daniel Berthiaume 27 saves / 31 shots

April 10	Edmonton Oilers	5–3	Winnipeg Jets	Winnipeg Arena	Recap
No scoring		First period	09:16 – pp – Dave Ellett (1); 13:23 – Andrew McBain (2)
Craig Simpson (4) – 07:18; Jari Kurri (2) – pp – 18:44; Charlie Huddy (2) – pp – 19:22		Second period	01:52 – pp – Paul MacLean (2)
Normand Lacombe (2) – 06:47; Jari Kurri (3) – pp – 16:38		Third period	No scoring
Grant Fuhr 32 saves / 35 shots		Goalie stats	Daniel Berthiaume 25 saves / 30 shots

April 12	Winnipeg Jets	2–6	Edmonton Oilers	Northlands Coliseum	Recap
No scoring		First period	09:07 – pp – Mark Messier (3); 17:37 – pp – Esa Tikkanen (2)
Dale Hawerchuk (2) – pp – 18:04; Dale Hawerchuk (3) – 18:28		Second period	09:36 – pp – Jari Kurri (4); 11:59 – pp – Mark Messier (4); 15:43 – Wayne Gretzky (1)
No scoring		Third period	18:39 – Jari Kurri (5)
Daniel Berthiaume 21 saves / 27 shots		Goalie stats	Grant Fuhr 23 saves / 25 shots

Edmonton won series 4–1

== Division finals ==
=== Prince of Wales Conference ===
==== (A1) Montreal Canadiens vs. (A2) Boston Bruins ====
This was the 23rd playoff series between these two teams. Montreal led 20–2 in previous playoff series meetings. This was the fifth year in a row that these team met in the playoffs. Montreal had defeated Boston in the Division Semifinals the four previous seasons.

This was Boston's first playoff series victory against Montreal since the 1943 Stanley Cup Semifinals. Boston had lost the previous 18 playoff series between these two teams, an NHL record for most consecutive playoff series defeats to one team. This was the first of three consecutive series between these two teams that ended in five games (with the winner of all three series making it to the Stanley Cup Finals).

April 18	Boston Bruins	2–5	Montreal Canadiens	Montreal Forum	Recap
No scoring		First period	03:33 – Kjell Dahlin (2); 08:52 – sh – Mike McPhee ()
Bob Joyce (3) – 16:47		Second period	05:17 – Claude Lemieux (2); 15:43 – Claude Lemieux (3)
Randy Burridge (1) – 07:05		Third period	14:39 – Stephane Richer (7)
Andy Moog 24 saves / 29 shots		Goalie stats	Brian Hayward 20 saves / 22 shots

April 20	Boston Bruins	4–3	Montreal Canadiens	Montreal Forum	Recap
No scoring		First period	No scoring
Bob Sweeney (3) – 03:50; Ray Bourque (2) – 09:07		Second period	No scoring
Moe Lemay (1) – 01:32; Cam Neely (3) – 09:45		Third period	09:01 – Mike McPhee (4); 12:56 – John Kordic (1); 18:07 – Larry Robinson (1)
Rejean Lemelin 27 saves / 30 shots		Goalie stats	Brian Hayward 10 saves / 14 shots Patrick Roy 0 saves / 0 shots

April 22	Montreal Canadiens	1–3	Boston Bruins	Boston Garden	Recap
No scoring		First period	04:07 – Moe Lemay (2)
No scoring		Second period	19:13 – sh – Bob Sweeney (4)
Chris Chelios (3) – 16:18		Third period	01:46 – Gord Kluzak (2)
Patrick Roy 32 saves / 35 shots		Goalie stats	Rejean Lemelin 22 saves / 23 shots

April 24	Montreal Canadiens	0–2	Boston Bruins	Boston Garden	Recap
No scoring		First period	No scoring
No scoring		Second period	11:25 – Rick Middleton (4)
No scoring		Third period	19:40 – en – Gord Kluzak (3)
Patrick Roy 22 saves / 23 shots		Goalie stats	Rejean Lemelin 22 saves / 22 shots

April 26	Boston Bruins	4–1	Montreal Canadiens	Montreal Forum	Recap
Steve Kasper (3) – 10:20; Cam Neely (4) – 14:09		First period	No scoring
Steve Kasper (4) – 10:02		Second period	14:35 – John Kordic (2)
Cam Neely (5) – 04:06		Third period	No scoring
Rejean Lemelin 28 saves / 29 shots		Goalie stats	Patrick Roy 24 saves / 28 shots

Boston won series 4–1

==== (P2) Washington Capitals vs. (P4) New Jersey Devils ====
This was the first playoff series between these two teams.

Patrik Sundstrom's eight-point effort in game three (3 goals, 5 assists) set a new Stanley Cup playoff record for most points in a single game.

In game seven, the Capitals rallied from a 2–0 deficit with two goals in the second period, but John MacLean scored the game-winning goal for the Devils with 6:11 left in the third period to send them to the conference finals for the first time in franchise history.

April 18	New Jersey Devils	1–3	Washington Capitals	Capital Centre	Recap
No scoring		First period	07:18 – Mike Ridley (3)
No scoring		Second period	03:29 – pp – Larry Murphy (1); 16:48 – Scott Stevens (1)
Tom Kurvers (1) – 09:49		Third period	No scoring
Sean Burke 28 saves / 31 shots		Goalie stats	Pete Peeters 33 saves / 34 shots

April 20	New Jersey Devils	5–2	Washington Capitals	Capital Centre	Recap
Aaron Broten (2) – pp – 09:37		First period	13:15 – Mike Ridley (4)
Aaron Broten (3) – 03:02; Aaron Broten (4) – pp – 05:23; Pat Verbeek (2) – 18:14		Second period	17:45 – pp – Larry Robinson (2)
Patrik Sundstrom (3) – pp – 12:49		Third period	No scoring
Sean Burke 28 saves / 30 shots		Goalie stats	Pete Peeters 25 saves / 30 shots

April 22	Washington Capitals	4–10	New Jersey Devils	Brendan Byrne Arena	Recap
Dave Christian (2) – pp – 18:22		First period	10:37 – pp – Mark Johnson (5); 15:07 – pp – Mark Johnson (6)
Larry Murphy (3) – 06:51; Mike Gartner (2) – 09:50; Larry Murphy (4) – 13:57		Second period	00:57 – Patrik Sundstrom (4); 02:01 – sh – Claude Loiselle (2); 11:39 – Anders Carlsson (1); 15:33 – Doug Brown (3); 19:45 – Patrik Sundstrom (5)
No scoring		Third period	02:59 – Mark Johnson (7); 09:47 – pp – Mark Johnson (8); 14:14 – Patrik Sundstrom (6)
Clint Malarchuk 14 saves / 21 shots Pete Peeters 7 saves / 10 shots		Goalie stats	Sean Burke 28 saves / 32 shots

April 24	Washington Capitals	4–1	New Jersey Devils	Brendan Byrne Arena	Recap
Dave Christian (3) – 03:55; Peter Sundstrom (2) – 11:02		First period	03:12 – pp – Tom Kurvers (2)
Dave Christian (4) – 09:11		Second period	No scoring
Dale Hunter (6) – pp – 08:45		Third period	No scoring
Pete Peeters 11 saves / 12 shots Clint Malarchuk 13 saves / 13 shots		Goalie stats	Sean Burke 27 saves / 31 shots

April 26	New Jersey Devils	3–1	Washington Capitals	Capital Centre	Recap
Kirk Muller (1) – 16:36		First period	No scoring
Tom Kurvers (3) – pp – 06:54		Second period	No scoring
Kirk Muller (2) – 13:26		Third period	10:24 – Mike Ridley (5)
Bob Sauve 28 saves / 29 shots		Goalie stats	Clint Malarchuk 28 saves / 31 shots

April 28	Washington Capitals	7–2	New Jersey Devils	Brendan Byrne Arena	Recap
Mike Ridley (6) – 06:40; Dale Hunter (7) – pp – 13:07; Stephen Leach (2) – 17:03		First period	00:18 – Claude Loiselle (3)
Yvon Corriveau (1) – 10:43; Dave Christian (5) – 17:48		Second period	No scoring
Kelly Miller (4) – sh – 05:25; Mike Gartner (3) – pp – 18:32		Third period	07:21 – David Maley (2)
Pete Peeters 25 saves / 27 shots		Goalie stats	Sean Burke 13 saves / 18 shots Bob Sauve 11 saves / 13 shots

April 30	New Jersey Devils	3–2	Washington Capitals	Capital Centre	Recap
Kirk Muller (3) – 00:14; Claude Loiselle (4) – 12:01		First period	No scoring
No scoring		Second period	15:21 – Grant Ledyard (1); 19:54 – Garry Galley (2)
John MacLean (5) – 13:49		Third period	No scoring
Sean Burke 30 saves / 32 shots		Goalie stats	Pete Peeters 23 saves / 26 shots

New Jersey won series 4–3

=== Clarence Campbell Conference ===
==== (N1) Detroit Red Wings vs. (N2) St. Louis Blues ====
This was the second playoff series meeting between these two teams. St. Louis won the only previous meeting 3–1 in the 1984 Norris Division Semifinals.

Detroit defeated St Louis in five games. Tim Higgins scored with 2:25 left in the third period of the series-clinching game five to send Detroit to the conference finals.

April 19	St. Louis Blues	4–5	Detroit Red Wings	Joe Louis Arena	Recap
Mark Hunter (1) – pp – 10:54; Brett Hull (7) – pp – 13::47		First period	01:48 – James Nill (6); 02:31 – Shawn Burr (2)
No scoring		Second period	08:34 – Steve Chiasson (1)
Mark Hunter (2) – 03:01; Gino Cavallini (3) – 13:32		Third period	06:08 – Shawn Burr (3); 07:46 – Gerard Gallant (3)
Greg Millen 17 saves / 22 shots		Goalie stats	Greg Stefan 15 saves / 19 shots

April 21	St. Louis Blues	0–6	Detroit Red Wings	Joe Louis Arena	Recap
No scoring		First period	07:00 – Petr Klima (7); 10:17 – pp – Steve Chiasson (2); 15:45 – Gerard Gallant (4)
No scoring		Second period	19:41 Petr Klima (8)
No scoring		Third period	10:24 – pp – Petr Klima (9); 18:52 – Brent Ashton (2)
Greg Millen 12 saves / 18 shots		Goalie stats	Greg Stefan 19 saves / 19 shots

April 23	Detroit Red Wings	3–6	St. Louis Blues	St. Louis Arena	Recap
Adam Oates (6) – 04:12; Bob Probert (4) – 17:58		First period	00:26 – Gino Cavallini (4)
No scoring		Second period	01:03 – Tony McKegney (1); 12:19 – pp – Tony Hrkac (6); 14:19 – Tony McKegney (2)
Dave Barr (3) – 19:33		Third period	07:12 – Doug Gilmour (3); 10:33 – pp – Gino Cavallini (5)
Greg Stefan 29 saves / 35 shots		Goalie stats	Greg Millen 25 saves / 28 shots

April 25	Detroit Red Wings	3–1	St. Louis Blues	St. Louis Arena	Recap
Gerard Gallant (5) – 14:33; Petr Klima (10) – 17:21		First period	No scoring
No scoring		Second period	19:40 – pp – Tony McKegney (3)
Gerard Gallant (6) – 09:53		Third period	No scoring
Glen Hanlon 27 saves / 28 shots		Goalie stats	Greg Millen 17 saves / 20 shots

April 27	St. Louis Blues	3–4	Detroit Red Wings	Joe Louis Arena	Recap
No scoring		First period	17:22 – pp – Lee Norwood (2)
Herb Raglan (1) – 01:29; Bernie Federko (2) – pp – 07:02		Second period	11:18 – pp – Bob Probert (5)
Steve Bozek (1) – 04:04		Third period	05:42 – John Chabot (3); 17:35 – Tim Higgins (1)
Greg Millen 27 saves / 31 shots		Goalie stats	Greg Stefan 13 saves / 16 shots

Detroit won series 4–1

==== (S1) Calgary Flames vs. (S2) Edmonton Oilers ====
This was the fourth playoff series meeting between these two teams. Edmonton won two of the previous three meetings. Calgary won the most recent meeting in seven games in the 1986 Smythe Division Finals.

In the Battle of Alberta the Oilers would claim the first sweep of the playoffs. In game two Wayne Gretzky scored the overtime winning goal short-handed. With the loss, the Flames became the first Presidents' Trophy winning team to swept in a playoff series.

April 19	Edmonton Oilers	3–1	Calgary Flames	Olympic Saddledome	Recap
Mark Messier (5) – pp – 11:49		First period	13:59 – pp – Brad McCrimmon (2)
No scoring		Second period	No scoring
Jari Kurri (6) – 13:23; Wayne Gretzky (2) – 16:18		Third period	No scoring
Grant Fuhr 26 saves / 27 shots		Goalie stats	Mike Vernon 16 saves / 19 shots

April 21	Edmonton Oilers	5–4	OT	Calgary Flames	Olympic Saddledome	Recap
Mark Messier (6) – pp – 13:49		First period		07:23 – Lanny McDonald (3); 11:26 – pp – Al MacInnis (3)
Charlie Huddy (3) – 11:20; Wayne Gretzky (3) – pp – 13:18		Second period		03:56 – pp – Rob Ramage (1)
Jari Kurri (7) – 16:01		Third period		04:03 – Tim Hunter (4)
Wayne Gretzky (4) – sh – 07:54		First overtime period		No scoring
Grant Fuhr 30 saves / 34 shots		Goalie stats		Mike Vernon 30 saves / 35 shots

April 23	Calgary Flames	2–4	Edmonton Oilers	Northlands Coliseum	Recap
Hakan Loob (8) – sh – 03:11		First period	09:23 – pp – Steve Smith (1)
No scoring		Second period	08:54 – Charlie Huddy (4); 17:10 – pp – Glenn Anderson (4)
Joe Nieuwendyk (2) – 06:46		Third period	09:04 – Jari Kurri (8)
Mike Vernon 18 saves / 22 shots		Goalie stats	Grant Fuhr 21 saves / 23 shots

April 25	Calgary Flames	4–6	Edmonton Oilers	Northlands Coliseum	Recap
No scoring		First period	09:27 – pp – Mark Messier (7); 15:31 – Craig Simpson (5)
Craig Coxe (1) – 10:39; Dana Murzyn (2) – 12:45; Joe Nieuwendyk (3) – 15:35		Second period	04:31 – Wayne Gretzky (5); 06:39 – Esa Tikkanen (3); 14:23 – Dave Hannan (1)
John Tonelli (2) – pp – 16:09		Third period	10:40 – Glenn Anderson (5)
Rick Wamsley 6 saves / 8 shots Mike Vernon 5 saves / 9 shots		Goalie stats	Grant Fuhr 26 saves / 30 shots

Edmonton won series 4–0

== Conference finals ==
=== Prince of Wales Conference final ===
==== (A2) Boston Bruins vs. (P4) New Jersey Devils ====
This was the first playoff meeting between these two teams.

This series featured the infamous confrontation between Devils coach Jim Schoenfeld and referee Don Koharski after Game 3, when, during an argument in the tunnel after the game, Koharski tripped and fell, accusing Schoenfield of pushing him. Schoenfield famously responded, "Good, 'cause you fell you fat pig!" Then, he yelled "Have another doughnut! Have another doughnut!" The incident has since become part of NHL lore.

Schoenfeld was suspended by NHL president John Ziegler for Game 4, but the Devils received an injunction from the New Jersey Supreme Court, allowing Schoenfeld to coach the fourth game. In protest, the officials scheduled to work that game in the Meadlowands refused to take the ice, forcing the NHL to scramble for amateur officials to call the game. The injunction was lifted, the league conducted a proper hearing, Schoenfeld served his suspension during Game 5 in the Boston Garden, and the League officials returned to work.

May 2	New Jersey Devils	3–5	Boston Bruins	Boston Garden	Recap
No scoring		First period	08:48 – Glen Wesley (1)
Tom Kurvers (4) – 11:26; Jack O'Callahan (1) – 13:45		Second period	02:38 – Steve Kasper (5); 09:40 – pp – Craig Janney (3)
Tom Kurvers (5) – pp – 02:48		Third period	05:56 – Ray Bourque (3); 16:05 – Ken Linseman (5)
Bob Sauve 25 saves / 30 shots		Goalie stats	Rejean Lemelin 25 saves / 28 shots

May 4	New Jersey Devils	3–2	OT	Boston Bruins	Boston Garden	Recap
Pat Verbeek (3) – pp – 11:38; Aaron Broten (5) – pp – 16:20		First period		04:38 – pp – Keith Crowder (2)
No scoring		Second period		No scoring
No scoring		Third period		16:36 – pp – Bob Joyce (4)
Doug Brown (4) – 17:46		First overtime period		No scoring
Sean Burke 39 saves / 41 shots		Goalie stats		Rejean Lemelin 30 saves / 33 shots

May 6	Boston Bruins	6–1	New Jersey Devils	Brendan Byrne Arena	Recap
No scoring		First period	No scoring
Ken Linseman (6) – pp – 01:05; Bob Joyce (5) – pp – 02:03; Lyndon Byers (1) – 02:18; Gord Kluzak (4) – 10:52; Ken Linseman (7) – 17:05		Second period	14:58 – pp – Brendan Shanahan (1)
Tom McCarthy (3) – 13:05		Third period	No scoring
Rejean Lemelin 23 saves / 24 shots		Goalie stats	Sean Burke 8 saves / 11 shots Bob Sauve 17 saves / 20 shots

May 8	Boston Bruins	1–3	New Jersey Devils	Brendan Byrne Arena	Recap
No scoring		First period	10:47 – David Maley (3); 11:32 – Pat Verbeek (4)
Cam Neely (6) – pp – 12:31		Second period	No scoring
No scoring		Third period	04:04 – Tom Kurvers (6)
Rejean Lemelin 15 saves / 18 shots		Goalie stats	Sean Burke 33 saves / 34 shots

May 10	New Jersey Devils	1–7	Boston Bruins	Boston Garden	Recap
Brendan Shanahan (2) – 18:05		First period	12:12 – pp – Michael Thelven (2); 17:24 – pp – Craig Janney (4)
No scoring		Second period	06:15 – Keith Crowder (3); 08:41 – Bob Joyce (6)
No scoring		Third period	03:28 – Bob Joyce (7); 09:05 – pp – Ken Linseman (8); 09:29 – Bob Sweeney (5)
Sean Burke 24 saves / 31 shots		Goalie stats	Rejean Lemelin 24 saves / 25 shots

May 12	Boston Bruins	3–6	New Jersey Devils	Brendan Byrne Arena	Recap
Willi Plett (2) – 01:57		First period	15:40 – Mark Johnson (9); 18:15 – Mark Johnson (10)
Bob Sweeney (6) – pp – 07:24; Michael Thelven (3) – 14:17		Second period	11:03 – Doug Brown (5); 17:12 – John MacLean (6)
No scoring		Third period	02:45 – Pat Conacher (2); 17:30 – pp – Patrik Sundstrom (7)
Rejean Lemelin 8 saves / 13 shots Andy Moog 14 saves / 15 shots		Goalie stats	Sean Burke 26 saves / 29 shots

May 14	New Jersey Devils	2–6	Boston Bruins	Boston Garden	Recap
No scoring		First period	08:59 – pp – Craig Janney (5); 11:59 – Moe Lemay (3)
John MacLean (7) – 15:28		Second period	02:57 – Rick Middleton (5)
Kirk Muller (4) – 03:41		Third period	12:05 – Craig Janney (6); 13:19 – Cam Neely (7); 19:36 – sh – en – Ken Linseman (9)
Sean Burke 25 saves / 30 shots		Goalie stats	Rejean Lemelin 17 saves / 19 shots

Boston won series 4–3

=== Clarence Campbell Conference final ===
==== (S2) Edmonton Oilers vs. (N1) Detroit Red Wings ====
This was the second playoff meeting between these two teams and was a rematch of the previous year's Clarence Campbell Conference Final which Edmonton won in five games.

May 3	Detroit Red Wings	1–4	Edmonton Oilers	Northlands Coliseum	Recap
No scoring		First period	07:30 – pp – Jari Kurri (9)
Brent Ashton (3) – 14:17		Second period	01:11 – Randy Gregg (1); 15:54 – pp – Craig Simpson (6)
No scoring		Third period	02:07 – Esa Tikkanen (1)
Greg Stefan 28 saves / 32 shots		Goalie stats	Grant Fuhr 15 saves / 16 shots

May 5	Detroit Red Wings	3–5	Edmonton Oilers	Northlands Coliseum	Recap
John Chabot (4) – 02:03		First period	No scoring
Mel Bridgman (3) – 15:20; Brent Ashton (4) – pp – 17:41		Second period	05:24 – pp – Mark Messier (8)
No scoring		Third period	00:48 – Mark Messier (9); 01:18 – Jari Kurri (10); 05:01 – pp – Craig Simpson (7); 19:41 – en – Wayne Gretzky (6)
Glen Hanlon 10 saves / 14 shots Greg Stefan 9 saves / 9 shots		Goalie stats	Grant Fuhr 25 saves / 28 shots

May 7	Edmonton Oilers	2–5	Detroit Red Wings	Joe Louis Arena	Recap
Wayne Gretzky (7) – pp – 04:47		First period	11:57 – pp – Brent Ashton (5)
No scoring		Second period	16:32 – Brent Ashton (6); 19:44 – pp – Bob Probert (6)
Wayne Gretzky (8) – pp – 01:10		Third period	17:37 – Dave Barr (4); 18:33 – Mel Bridgman (4)
Grant Fuhr 26 saves / 31 shots		Goalie stats	Glen Hanlon 23 saves / 25 shots

May 9	Edmonton Oilers	4–3	OT	Detroit Red Wings	Joe Louis Arena	Recap
Craig Simpson (8) – 15:22		First period		19:21 – pp – Adam Oates (7)
Jari Kurri (11) – 00:23; Glenn Anderson (6) – pp – 04:03		Second period		10:25 – pp – Bob Probert (7)
No scoring		Third period		13:13 – pp – Bob Probert (8)
Jari Kurri (12) – 11:02		First overtime period		No scoring
Grant Fuhr 20 saves / 23 shots		Goalie stats		Glen Hanlon 24 saves / 28 shots

May 11	Detroit Red Wings	4–8	Edmonton Oilers	Northlands Coliseum	Recap
Brent Ashton (7) – sh – 04:19		First period	00:47 – Craig Simpson (9); 08:08 – Craig Simpson (10)
Dave Barr (5) – 00:41		Second period	05:55 – Mark Messier (10); 14:36 – Mike Krushelnyski (2); 15:00 – Keith Acton (1); 18:02 – pp – Jari Kurri (13)
Adam Oates (8) – 01:33; Steve Yzerman (1) – 04:13		Third period	14:49 – Mike Krushelnyski (3); 19:08 – en – Wayne Gretzky (9)
Greg Stefan 25 saves / 32 shots		Goalie stats	Grant Fuhr 20 saves / 24 shots

Edmonton won series 4–1

== Stanley Cup Final ==
This was the first Final meeting between these two teams.

The original Game 4 is well known for the high heat resulting in fog that interfered with the game and a subsequent power outage that caused the game to be canceled at 16:37 of the second period. The game results didn't count, but players were able to retain their stats counting towards their playoff records, as per NHL rules. The series moved on to Edmonton, thus allowing the Oilers to win the Cup at home at Northlands Coliseum and complete the four game sweep.

May 18	Boston Bruins	1–2	Edmonton Oilers	Northlands Coliseum	Recap
No scoring		First period	No scoring
Cam Neely (8) – 13:15		Second period	01:56 – pp – Wayne Gretzky (10)
No scoring		Third period	01:15 – Keith Acton (2)
Andy Moog 20 saves / 22 shots		Goalie stats	Grant Fuhr 13 saves / 14 shots

May 20	Boston Bruins	2–4	Edmonton Oilers	Northlands Coliseum	Recap
No scoring		First period	15:57 – pp – Glenn Anderson (7); 19:30 – pp – Mark Messier (11)
No scoring		Second period	No scoring
Bob Joyce (8) – 00:35; Ken Linseman (10) – 03:16		Third period	11:21 – Wayne Gretzky (11); 19:53 – en – Jari Kurri (14)
Rejean Lemelin 28 saves / 31 shots		Goalie stats	Grant Fuhr 10 saves / 12 shots

May 22	Edmonton Oilers	6–3	Boston Bruins	Boston Garden	Recap
Kevin McClelland (2) – 16:18		First period	02:46 – Randy Burridge (2)
Esa Tikkanen (5) – pp – 10:25; Glenn Anderson (9) – 12:57		Second period	No scoring
Esa Tikkanen (6) – 01:32; Craig Simpson (11) – 10:28; Esa Tikkanen (7) – en – 19:40		Third period	04:19 – Moe Lemay (4); 14:02 – pp – Cam Neely (9)
Grant Fuhr 25 saves / 28 shots		Goalie stats	Rejean Lemelin 19 saves / 24 shots

May 24	Edmonton Oilers	3–3	Boston Bruins	Boston Garden	Recap
Glenn Anderson (9) – 00:10; Esa Tikkanen (8) – pp – 15:33		First period	16:56 – Greg Hawgood (1)
Craig Simpson (12) – pp – 16:37		Second period	06:12 – sh – Glen Wesley (5); 07:37 – pp – Glen Wesley (6)
No period		Third period	No period
Grant Fuhr 18 saves / 21 shots		Goalie stats	Andy Moog 16 saves / 19 shots

May 26	Boston Bruins	3–6	Edmonton Oilers	Northlands Coliseum	Recap
Steve Kasper (6) – 00:43; Ken Linseman (11) – pp – 09:44		First period	06:07 – Normand Lacombe (3); 15:03 – pp – Esa Tikkanen (9)
No scoring		Second period	06:38 – Mike Krushelnyski (4); 09:44 – pp – Wayne Gretzky (12); 19:58 – Craig Simpson (13)
Steve Kasper (7) – 06:35		Third period	01:21 – Esa Tikkanen (10)
Andy Moog 20 saves / 26 shots		Goalie stats	Grant Fuhr 16 saves / 19 shots

Edmonton won series 4–0

== Player statistics ==
=== Skaters ===
These are the top ten skaters based on points.

Player	Team	GP	G	A	Pts	+/–	PIM
Wayne Gretzky	Edmonton Oilers	19	12	31	43	+9	16
Mark Messier	Edmonton Oilers	19	11	23	34	+9	29
Jari Kurri	Edmonton Oilers	19	14	17	31	+15	12
Esa Tikkanen	Edmonton Oilers	19	10	17	27	+2	72
Ken Linseman	Boston Bruins	23	11	14	25	+4	56
Glenn Anderson	Edmonton Oilers	19	9	16	25	+5	49
Bob Probert	Detroit Red Wings	16	8	13	21	+8	51
Ray Bourque	Boston Bruins	23	3	18	21	+16	26
Adam Oates	Detroit Red Wings	16	8	12	20	-2	6
Patrik Sundstrom	New Jersey Devils	18	7	13	20	+7	14

=== Goaltenders ===
This is a combined table of the top five goaltenders based on goals against average and the top five goaltenders based on save percentage, with at least 420 minutes played. The table is sorted by GAA, and the criteria for inclusion are bolded.

Player	Team	GP	W	L	SA	GA	GAA	SV%	SO	TOI
Rejean Lemelin	Boston Bruins	17	11	6	428	45	**2.64**	**.895**	1	1024:27
Grant Fuhr	Edmonton Oilers	19	16	2	470	55	**2.91**	**.883**	0	1135:37
Glen Hanlon	Detroit Red Wings	8	4	3	170	22	**3.07**	.871	1	430:37
Pete Peeters	Washington Capitals	12	7	5	325	34	**3.12**	**.895**	0	652:49
Patrick Roy	Montreal Canadiens	8	3	4	217	24	**3.36**	**.889**	0	428:57

== See also ==
- List of Stanley Cup champions

Preceded by 1987 Stanley Cup playoffs	Stanley Cup playoffs	Succeeded by 1989 Stanley Cup playoffs
