= Craig Wolanin =

American ice hockey player

- Born: July 27, 1967 (age 59) Grosse Pointe, Michigan, U.S.
- Height: 6 ft 3 in (191 cm)
- Weight: 205 lb (93 kg; 14 st 9 lb)
- Position: Defense
- Shot: Left
- Played for: New Jersey Devils; Quebec Nordiques; Colorado Avalanche; Tampa Bay Lightning; Toronto Maple Leafs
- National team: United States
- NHL draft: 3rd overall, 1985; New Jersey Devils
- Playing career: 1985–1999

Craig William Wolanin (born July 27, 1967) is an American former professional ice hockey defenseman who played 13 seasons in the National Hockey League from 1985 until 1998.

== Early career ==
Wolanin is a native of Grosse Pointe, Michigan. As a youth, he played in the 1980 Quebec International Pee-Wee Hockey Tournament with the Detroit Paddock minor ice hockey team.

Wolanin played one season for the Compuware program recording eight goals, 42 assists and 86 penalty minutes, while helping the Compuware team win the Michigan AAA state hockey championship. Seeking competition and looking to improve his draft stock, Wolanin elected to play for the Kitchener Rangers of the Ontario Hockey League. Wolanin recorded five goals, 16 assists and 95 penalty minutes. Despite not being an offensive player, his defensive prowess made him a sought after prospect leading into the 1985 NHL entry draft.

== Playing career ==
=== New Jersey Devils ===
Wolanin was selected third overall by the New Jersey Devils in the 1985 NHL entry draft. Wolanin made his NHL debut on October 10, 1985, against the Philadelphia Flyers. Upon making his NHL debut at 18 years and 2 months in the 1985-86 season, Wolanin became the youngest player in the history of the Scouts/Rockies/Devils franchise. Wolanin played 44 games during his rookie season, recording two goals, 16 assists and 74 penalty minutes.

Wolanin established himself as a mainstay on the Devils blueline in his second season, recording four goals, six assists and 109 penalty minutes. The following season, he paired with Ken Daneyko for most of the season. During the 1988 Stanley Cup playoffs, Wolanin scored the first playoff goal for the Devils franchise in game one of the Wales Conference Quarterfinals.

Wolanin battled injuries and consistency during his final full season with the Devils. After spending a portion of the 1988–89 season on injury reserve, Wolanin was a healthy scratch for seven of the Devils' first eight games of the 1989–90 season. In search of playing time, Wolanin was assigned to the Devils affiliate, the Utica Devils. Wolanin requested a trade from the Devils, which was fulfilled on March 6, 1990, when Wolanin and future considerations (Randy Velischek) were traded to the Quebec Nordiques in exchange for Peter Stastny.

=== Quebec Nordiques/Colorado Avalanche ===
While Wolanin embraced a full-time role on the Nordiques blueline, the team was a perennial doormat in the standings. Wolanin established himself as an anchor on the Nordiques defense, and became known for his defensive prowess and ability of clearing opposing players from the front of the net. Wolanin played in a career-high 80 games during the 1990–91 season, earning an invitation to play for the United States national team at the 1991 IIHF World Championship at the end of the season. Wolanin missed significant time throughout the rest of his tenure with the Nordiques, battling various injuries.

The Nordiques moved to Denver prior to the start of the 1995–96 season, becoming the Colorado Avalanche. Wolanin's lone season in Colorado was his best statistical season, with seven goals and 20 assists in 75 games. The Avalanche went on to win the Stanley Cup that season, but Wolanin played just seven games during the team's championship run. Wolanin turned the puck over in the Avalanche's end in game three of the team's Western Conference semifinal series against the Chicago Blackhawks, which led to Sergei Krivokrasov's overtime goal to put the Hawks up two games to one. Following that game, Wolanin's gaffe led to an argument between Patrick Roy and head coach Marc Crawford, who opted to sit him for the rest of the playoffs. Wolanin still qualified to have his name engraved on the Stanley Cup, as he played in 75 of the team's games that season.

=== Later career ===
Wolanin was traded by the Avalanche to the Tampa Bay Lightning on June 21, 1996, in exchange for the Lightning's second-round draft pick in 1998 (Ramzi Abid). Wolanin's tenure with the Lightning lasted 15 games, as he struggled with consistency and injuries throughout the course of the season. The Lightning traded Wolanin to the Toronto Maple Leafs on February 1, 1997, in exchange for the Maple Leafs' third-round pick in 1998 (Alex Henry). Wolanin played a total of 33 games over two seasons with the Maple Leafs, missing the majority of the 1997–98 season due to a knee injury. He attempted a comeback for the 1998–99 season, but with no interest from NHL teams, he skated with the International Hockey League's Detroit Vipers for 16 games, recording five assists before announcing his retirement from professional ice hockey.

== Personal life ==
Wolanin met his wife, while playing for the Nordiques. The couple have three children; a son, Christian, who plays for the Colorado Avalanche, and two daughters. The family resides in Rochester, Michigan. On June 26, 2025 Wolanin was inducted into the National Polish-American Sports Hall of Fame located in Troy, Michigan; Class of 2025.

== Career statistics ==
=== Regular season and playoffs ===
			Regular season					Playoffs
Season	Team	League	GP	G	A	Pts	PIM	GP	G	A	Pts	PIM
1983–84	Detroit Compuware Ambassadors	MNHL	69	8	42	50	86	—	—	—	—	—
1984–85	Kitchener Rangers	OHL	60	5	16	21	95	4	1	1	2	2
1985–86	New Jersey Devils	NHL	44	2	16	18	74	—	—	—	—	—
1986–87	New Jersey Devils	NHL	68	4	6	10	109	—	—	—	—	—
1987–88	New Jersey Devils	NHL	78	6	25	31	170	18	2	5	7	51
1988–89	New Jersey Devils	NHL	56	3	8	11	69	—	—	—	—	—
1989–90	Utica Devils	AHL	6	2	4	6	2	—	—	—	—	—
1989–90	New Jersey Devils	NHL	37	1	7	8	47	—	—	—	—	—
1989–90	Quebec Nordiques	NHL	13	0	3	3	10	—	—	—	—	—
1990–91	Quebec Nordiques	NHL	80	5	13	18	89	—	—	—	—	—
1991–92	Quebec Nordiques	NHL	69	2	11	13	80	—	—	—	—	—
1992–93	Quebec Nordiques	NHL	24	1	4	5	49	4	0	0	0	4
1993–94	Quebec Nordiques	NHL	63	6	10	16	80	—	—	—	—	—
1994–95	Quebec Nordiques	NHL	40	3	6	9	40	6	1	1	2	4
1995–96	Colorado Avalanche	NHL	75	7	20	27	50	7	1	0	1	8
1996–97	Tampa Bay Lightning	NHL	15	0	0	0	8	—	—	—	—	—
1996–97	Toronto Maple Leafs	NHL	23	0	4	4	13	—	—	—	—	—
1997–98	Toronto Maple Leafs	NHL	10	0	0	0	6	—	—	—	—	—
1998–99	Detroit Vipers	IHL	16	0	5	5	21	11	0	0	0	12
NHL totals			695	40	133	173	894	35	4	6	10	67

=== International ===
Year	Team	Event	Result	GP	G	A	Pts	PIM
1987	United States	WJC	4th	9	0	0	0	32
1991	United States	CC	2nd	8	0	2	2	2
1991	United States	WC	4th	10	2	2	4	22
1994	United States	WC	4th	8	2	1	3	4
Junior totals				9	0	0	0	32
Senior totals				26	4	5	9	28

Awards and achievements
Preceded by Kirk Muller	New Jersey Devils first-round draft pick 1985	Succeeded by Neil Brady
