= Réjean Lemelin =

Canadian ice hockey player and coach

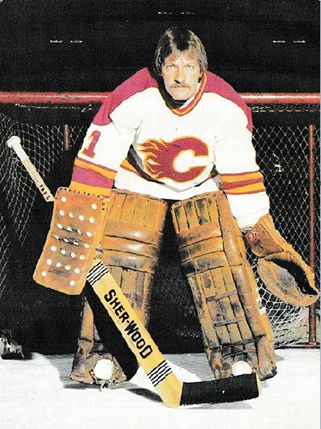
- Lemelin with the Calgary Flames in 1980
- Born: November 19, 1954 (age 71) Quebec City, Quebec, Canada
- Height: 5 ft 11 in (180 cm)
- Weight: 170 lb (77 kg; 12 st 2 lb)
- Position: Goaltender
- Caught: Left
- Played for: Atlanta Flames; Calgary Flames; Boston Bruins
- National team: Canada
- NHL draft: 125th overall, 1974; Philadelphia Flyers
- WHA draft: 209th overall, 1974; Chicago Cougars
- Playing career: 1974–1992
Medal record
Representing Canada
Men's ice hockey
Canada Cup
Gold medal – first place	1984 Canada	Ice hockey

Réjean M. "Reggie" Lemelin (born November 19, 1954) is a Canadian former professional ice hockey goaltender and coach. Lemelin played in the National Hockey League (NHL) for the Atlanta Flames, Calgary Flames and Boston Bruins. He is perhaps best known for leading the Bruins over the Montreal Canadiens for the first time since 1943, a span of 45 years and 18 series, in the 1988 playoffs. After his playing career, Lemelin spent 13 years as a goaltending coach for the Philadelphia Flyers, who had originally drafted him into the NHL.

== Playing career ==
As a youth, Lemelin played in the 1965, 1966 and 1967 Quebec International Pee-Wee Hockey Tournaments with a minor ice hockey team from Orsainville, Quebec City.

After playing two seasons in the QMJHL with the Sherbrooke Beavers, Lemelin joined the North American Hockey League's Philadelphia Firebirds. He was drafted by the Philadelphia Flyers in the seventh round, 125th overall, in the 1974 NHL amateur draft, and was also selected by the Chicago Cougars in the 1974 WHA Amateur Draft; however, he never played in the WHA, due to an argument with management. His NHL debut came with the Atlanta Flames during the 1978–79 season.

Lemelin remained with the Flames through their move to Calgary, where he enjoyed the most success of his career. He split goaltending duties with Pat Riggin and then Don Edwards, earning the starting job in 1983. In 1984, he played 2 games for Canada in the 1984 Canada Cup, going 1-1. After losing his starting job in Calgary to Mike Vernon, he joined the Boston Bruins for the 1987–88 season, and would be instrumental in the Bruins overcoming the Canadiens for the first time since 1943 in the 1988 playoffs. Lemelin went 4-0, with a .952 save percentage, stopping 99 of 104 shots, and 1 shutout against the Habs after starting game 2 over Andy Moog, who had lost the series opener 5-2. The Bruins would make it to the Stanley Cup Finals that year, losing in a sweep to the Edmonton Oilers. The following season, he and Moog would win the NHL's William M. Jennings Trophy (for fewest team goals allowed).

After battling numerous injuries, Lemelin retired during the 1992–93 season, with his final game on December 29, 1992 in Winnipeg against the Jets. In his NHL career, he appeared in 507 games and had only two losing seasons.

After 13 seasons as the goaltending coach for the Philadelphia Flyers, Lemelin was replaced on June 25, 2009, by Jeff Reese. As of 2010, he was active in Boston area charity hockey games, playing as a goaltender with the Boston Bruins Alumni exhibition team.

== Personal life ==
Lemelin married his wife, Rona, in July 1976. They have two children together, Brian and Stephanie.

== Awards ==
- Won gold in the 1984 Canada Cup as a member of Team Canada.
- Selected to 40th National Hockey League All-Star Game (1988–89 season)
- William M. Jennings Trophy (fewest goals allowed in NHL): 1989–90 season (w/Andy Moog)
- Named One of the Top 100 Best Bruins Players of all Time.

== Career statistics ==
=== Regular season and playoffs ===
Bold indicates led league

			Regular season									Playoffs
Season	Team	League	GP	W	L	T	MIN	GA	SO	GAA	SV%	GP	W	L	MIN	GA	SO	GAA	SV%
1972–73	Sherbrooke Castors	QMJHL	28	—	—	—	1,660	146	0	5.28	.874	2	—	—	120	12	0	6.00	.836
1973–74	Sherbrooke Castors	QMJHL	35	—	—	—	2,060	158	0	4.60	.866	1	—	—	60	3	0	3.00	.927
1974–75	Philadelphia Firebirds	NAHL	43	21	16	2	2,277	131	3	3.45	—	—	—	—	—	—	—	—	—
1975–76	Richmond Robins	AHL	3	—	—	—	402	30	0	4.48	—	—	—	—	—	—	—	—	—
1975–76	Philadelphia Firebirds	NAHL	29	—	—	—	1,601	97	1	3.63	—	3	—	—	171	15	0	5.26	—
1976–77	Springfield Indians	AHL	3	2	1	0	180	10	0	3.33	.895	—	—	—	—	—	—	—	—
1976–77	Philadelphia Firebirds	NAHL	51	26	19	1	2,763	170	1	3.61	—	3	—	—	191	14	0	4.40	—
1977–78	Philadelphia Firebirds	AHL	60	31	21	7	3,585	177	4	2.96	—	2	0	2	119	12	0	6.05	—
1978–79	Atlanta Flames	NHL	18	8	8	1	994	55	0	3.32	.881	1	0	0	20	0	0	0.00	1.000
1978–79	Philadelphia Firebirds	AHL	13	3	9	1	780	36	0	2.77	—	—	—	—	—	—	—	—	—
1979–80	Atlanta Flames	NHL	3	0	2	0	150	15	0	6.00	.776	—	—	—	—	—	—	—	—
1979–80	Birmingham Bulls	CHL	38	13	21	2	2,188	137	0	3.76	.884	2	0	1	79	5	0	3.80	—
1980–81	Calgary Flames	NHL	29	14	6	7	1,629	88	2	3.24	.902	6	3	3	366	22	0	3.61	.897
1980–81	Birmingham Bulls	CHL	13	3	8	2	757	56	0	4.44	.864	—	—	—	—	—	—	—	—
1981–82	Calgary Flames	NHL	34	10	15	6	1,866	135	0	4.34	.873	—	—	—	—	—	—	—	—
1982–83	Calgary Flames	NHL	39	16	12	8	2,211	133	0	3.61	.888	7	3	3	237	27	0	4.95	.852
1983–84	Calgary Flames	NHL	51	21	12	**9**	2,568	150	0	3.50	.893	8	4	4	448	32	0	4.29	.890
1984–85	Calgary Flames	NHL	56	30	12	**10**	3,176	183	1	3.46	.888	4	1	3	248	15	1	3.63	.883
1985–86	Calgary Flames	NHL	60	29	24	4	3,369	229	1	4.08	.872	3	0	1	109	7	0	3.85	.854
1986–87	Calgary Flames	NHL	34	16	9	1	1,735	94	2	3.25	.886	2	0	1	101	6	0	3.56	.872
1987–88	Boston Bruins	NHL	49	24	17	6	2,822	138	3	2.93	.889	17	11	6	1,024	45	**1**	2.64	.895
1988–89	Boston Bruins	NHL	40	19	15	6	2,392	120	0	3.01	.887	4	1	3	252	16	0	3.82	.857
1989–90	Boston Bruins	NHL	43	22	15	2	2,310	108	2	2.80	.892	3	0	1	135	13	0	5.79	.772
1990–91	Boston Bruins	NHL	33	17	10	3	1,829	111	1	3.64	.868	2	0	0	32	0	0	0.00	1.000
1991–92	Boston Bruins	NHL	8	5	1	0	407	23	0	3.39	.890	2	0	0	54	3	0	3.33	.870
1992–93	Boston Bruins	NHL	10	5	4	0	542	31	0	3.43	.862	—	—	—	—	—	—	—	—
NHL totals			507	236	162	63	28,000	1613	12	3.46	.884	59	23	25	3,116	186	2	3.58	.881

Preceded by Patrick Roy and Brian Hayward	Winner of the William M. Jennings Trophy; 1989–90 (with Andy Moog)	Succeeded by Ed Belfour
