= Grant Fuhr =

Canadian ice hockey player (born 1962)

- Hockey Hall of Fame, 2003
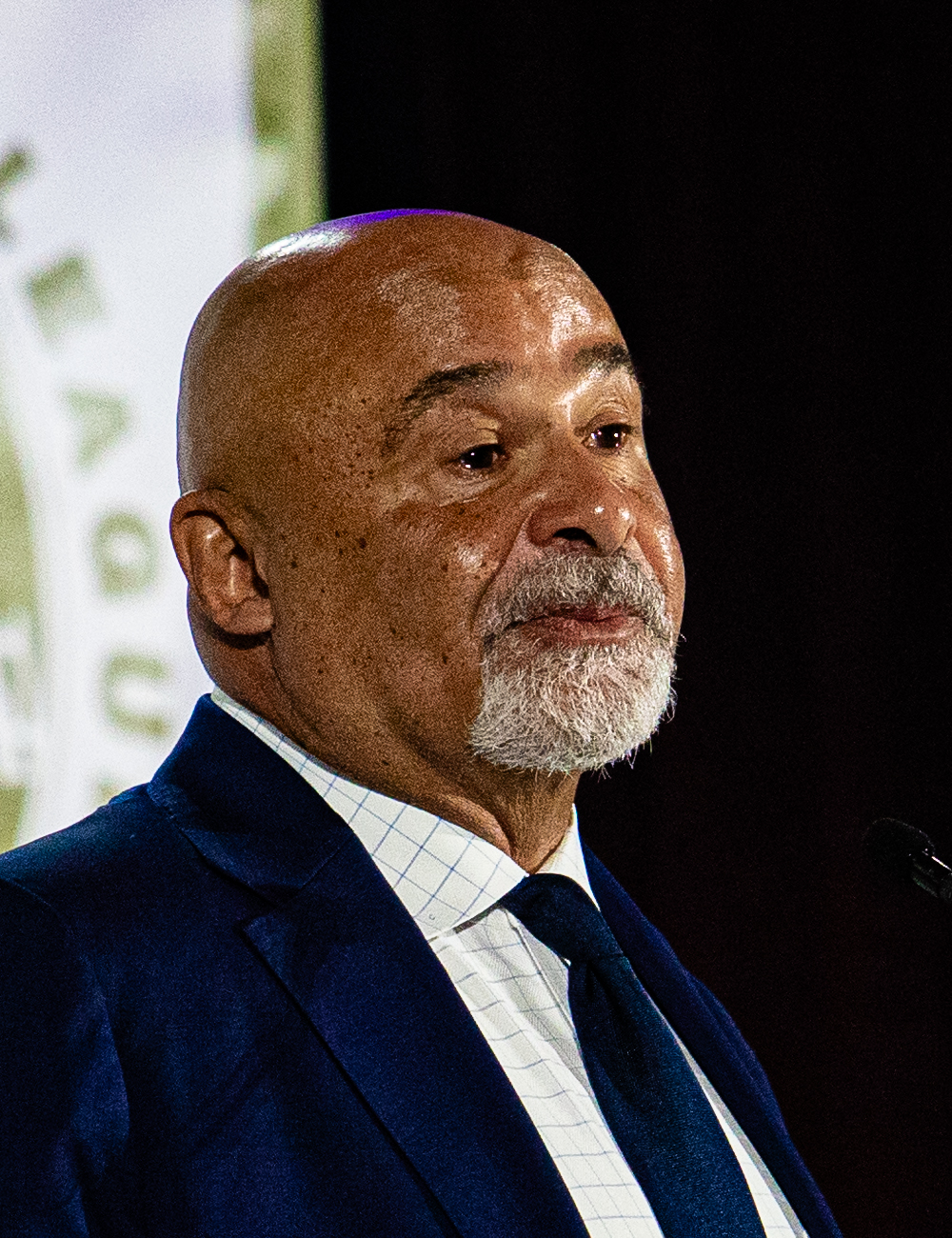
- Fuhr in 2025
- Born: September 28, 1962 (age 64) Spruce Grove, Alberta, Canada
- Height: 5 ft 10 in (178 cm)
- Weight: 201 lb (91 kg; 14 st 5 lb)
- Position: Goaltender
- Caught: Right
- Played for: Edmonton Oilers; Toronto Maple Leafs; Buffalo Sabres; Los Angeles Kings; St. Louis Blues; Calgary Flames
- National team: Canada
- NHL draft: 8th overall, 1981; Edmonton Oilers
- Playing career: 1981–2000
Medal record
Representing Canada
Men's ice hockey
Canada Cup
Gold medal – first place	1984 Canada
Gold medal – first place	1987 Canada
World Championships
Silver medal – second place	1989 Sweden

Grant Scott Fuhr (fyoo-er; born September 28, 1962) is a Canadian former professional ice hockey goaltender. He played 19 seasons as a goaltender in the National Hockey League (NHL), 10 of them for the Edmonton Oilers, with whom he won five Stanley Cup championships in 14 postseason campaigns. He also won the Canada Cup two times with Canada, his first as the backup goaltender for the team in 1984, and his second as the starting goaltender in 1987 as well as finishing second in the World Championships in 1989. Fuhr is widely regarded as one of the best goaltenders of his era. He was elected to the Hockey Hall of Fame in 2003. In 2017, he was named by the league as one of the "100 Greatest NHL Players".

Fuhr holds select NHL and franchise records among goaltenders; he ranks as the leader in most games played by a goaltender in a single season (79) and most assists and points by a goaltender in regular season and playoffs combined (61). His rookie season saw him go on an undefeated streak of 23 straight games without a loss. In his first eight seasons as a goaltender, Fuhr won 211 games as the starting goaltender for four Stanley Cup championships while winning the Vezina Trophy in the 1987–88 season (which saw him play a then-record 75 games) and being selected to the NHL All-Star Game six times. Injuries limited Fuhr in the 1989–90 season to where he missed the entire playoff run that saw the Oilers win the Cup for the fifth time. Amidst personal issues, Fuhr was traded in 1991 to the Toronto Maple Leafs, where he spent the following two seasons before being traded to the Buffalo Sabres midway through the 1992–93 season. He shared the William M. Jennings Trophy for allowing the fewest number of goals in the 1993–94 season. He spent the following six seasons with three further teams, most notably with the St. Louis Blues, where he played a record 79 games as goaltender in the 1995–96 season. He concluded his career in the 1999–2000 season with the Calgary Flames, where he became the sixth goaltender to win 400 games. Fuhr had only three seasons where he posted more losses than wins.

A trailblazing player for his generation with fearless athleticism, Fuhr was the first Black ice hockey player to win the Stanley Cup and the first inducted into the Hockey Hall of Fame. After retiring, Fuhr served as a goaltending coach for the Calgary Flames from 2000 to 2002 and Arizona Coyotes from 2004 to 2010.

== Early life ==
Fuhr was born on September 28, 1962, in Spruce Grove, Alberta, west of Edmonton to a Black Canadian and a First Nation-Canadian from the Enoch Cree Nation; he never knew his birth parents. Less than three weeks after he was born, he was adopted by Betty Wheeler and Robert Fuhr and he grew up in Spruce Grove.

In the mid-1970s, Fuhr played for the Enoch Tomahawks hockey team. Fuhr's mother came from Enoch Cree Nation.

In 1979, at the age of 16, Fuhr joined the Victoria Cougars of the Western Hockey League (WHL). After two outstanding seasons in Victoria, which included the league championship and a trip to the Memorial Cup in 1981, Fuhr was drafted eighth overall by the Edmonton Oilers in the 1981 NHL entry draft, on June 10, 1981.

== Playing career ==
=== Edmonton Oilers (1981–1991) ===
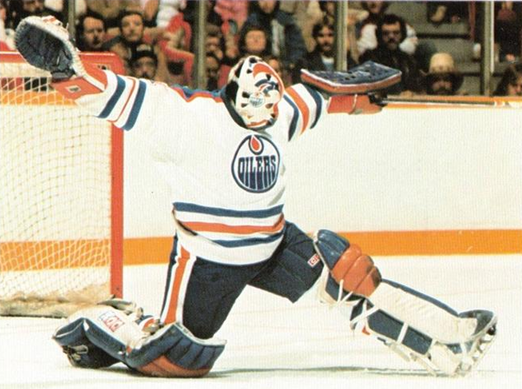
Fuhr with the Edmonton Oilers c. 1984

Fuhr was selected as the eighth overall pick of the 1981 NHL entry draft by the Edmonton Oilers. It was noted years later that although the Oilers had drafted Andy Moog at goaltender, the Oilers were attracted by Fuhr's .907 save percentage for the Victoria Cougars in a high-scoring era. Reportedly, the Oilers briefly considered drafting James Patrick, who was still on the board at No. 8 but went with Fuhr. In his first season with the Oilers, Fuhr lost his debut game on October 14 against the Winnipeg Jets before going on an unprecedented run that saw him win or tie in his next 23 games, which became a new record for a rookie goaltender. In 48 games (with one appearance in relief), Fuhr went 28–5–14. He was tabbed to start the first round of the 1982 Stanley Cup playoffs, which saw the Oilers upset by the Los Angeles Kings where he gave up 26 goals in five games (six coming in the "Miracle on Manchester" game where the Oilers gave up six unanswered goals).

Fuhr played ten seasons for the Oilers, where he teamed up first with Andy Moog from 1981 through 1987, then Bill Ranford from 1988 through 1991 to form one of the most formidable goaltending tandems in history, winning the Stanley Cup four times in five seasons (1983–84 through 1987–88); Fuhr was quoted in an interview as being appreciative of having Moog and Ranford as partners because it made him play better.

Moog was given the starting job in the 1983 Stanley Cup playoffs and helped lead the Oilers to their first Stanley Cup Final, though they were swept by the New York Islanders, who captured their fourth straight Stanley Cup. The next year general manager and head coach Glen Sather chose to go with Fuhr in the Stanley Cup playoffs. The Oilers advanced all the way to the Stanley Cup Final to set up a rematch with the Islanders. In Game 3, Fuhr suffered an injury when he collided with Pat LaFontaine. Moog stepped in and played the next two games that the Oilers won to win the Final; Fuhr became the first Black player to have his name engraved on the Stanley Cup. After that, Fuhr remained the number one goaltender.

In the 1986 Stanley Cup playoffs, the Oilers were engaged in a tight battle with the Calgary Flames in the second round. In Game 7, late in the third period, teammate Steve Smith accidentally sent a pass that bounced off Fuhr's skate for an own goal that gave Calgary the lead that they would not relinquish as the Flames eliminated the Oilers to de-throne them as defending champions.

In February of 1987, Fuhr played in goal for the NHL All-Stars in both games of the Rendez-Vous '87 series against the Soviet National Team. In August 1987, Fuhr backstopped Canada at the Canada Cup, which saw him play all nine games for the victorious squad. Fuhr became part of history with the 1987–88 season, as he played in 75 games and went 40–24–9 with a GAA of 3.43 to set a new record for most games played a goaltender in one season. He won his only Vezina Trophy as the NHL's top goaltender and finished second in voting for the Hart Memorial Trophy as league MVP, behind Mario Lemieux and ahead of teammate Wayne Gretzky. In the playoffs, he went 16–2 as the Oilers won the Stanley Cup once again. As an Oiler he had played in six All-Star games, by playing in the National Hockey League All-Star Game in 1982, 1984, 1985, 1986, 1988, and 1989.

From February 14 to March 25, 1986, Fuhr won ten straight games for the Oilers to set a new franchise record that would not be eclipsed until 2024. He also played for the NHL All-Star team in the two-game series against the Soviet Union national ice hockey team in Rendez-vous '87 as the starting goaltender. Fuhr's playoff success fed into his reputation as the supreme clutch goaltender of his era, and there was a period from 1987 through at least 1989 where Fuhr was often called "the best goaltender in the world". On January 28, 1989, Fuhr attained his 200th career win with a 7–6 road win over the Los Angeles Kings at the Great Western Forum. In the 1989 offseason, Fuhr had reached an endorsement deal with Pepsi to wear the logo on his pads. The NHL soon enacted a new policy that would require all manufacturers to pay the league a select fee before any identifiable logos could be worn by players. Fuhr briefly retired from the Oilers on June 8, 1989, citing only that he had felt a "lack of respect" from teammates. Fuhr's agent Rich Winter stated that another factor was the refusal of the Oilers to sign papers allowing to continue his endorsement obligations. Two months later, on August 24, 1989, the two sides made up and Fuhr returned to the team.

In the 1989–90 season, Fuhr played in just 21 games due to various injuries, which started in September 1989 when he felt pain in his abdomen that led to him having to undergo emergency appendectomy surgery that led to speculation he might be sidelined for two months. While Bill Ranford served as goaltender for the Oilers to start the season, Fuhr did return to action after over a month, which saw him play two games with the AHL Cape Breton Oilers team before returning to play for Edmonton on October 29, where he took the loss against Montreal after giving up five goals. He played most of the games in November before suffering an injury in the December 16 game against the St. Louis Blues that saw his left shoulder require reconstructive surgery that knocked him out until March. He played in four games in March but re-injured his shoulder. While Fuhr was healthy enough to play by May, but the Oilers, as goaltended by Ranford, won the Stanley Cup once again.

In the 1990 offseason, Fuhr's problem with substance abuse came to the forefront of the team and soon the media. Sather confronted Fuhr several times about any potential problems but Fuhr had denied having a problem and had tested negative for cocaine three times. In the summer, he was treated for cocaine abuse at a counseling centre in St. Petersburg, Florida for two weeks. On September 1, the Edmonton Journal reported that Fuhr admitted to lying to Sather, who confirmed Fuhr's treatment for cocaine abuse. Fuhr stated that he had abused a "substance" since 1983 on a period of every few weeks. Details of Fuhr's drug use were supplied by his ex-wife, Corrine, who told the press in Edmonton that she often found cocaine hidden in his clothing and that she fielded numerous threatening telephone calls from drug dealers who had not been paid. That same day saw the announcement by the NHL that they began an investigation on Fuhr after receiving the information and set a hearing for September 26.

On September 27, 1990, Fuhr was suspended by NHL President John Ziegler for one year, calling Fuhr's conduct “dishonorable and against the welfare of the league.” He provided grounds for reinstatement as early as February 1991 provided that Fuhr met certain conduct requirements. The suspension was later reduced to the first 59 games of the 1990–91 season. After missing 59 games and entering a two-week rehab program, the suspension was lifted by the league on February 18, 1991.

In the second game Fuhr played in the American Hockey League prior to returning to the NHL, he heard chants from the New Haven Nighthawks crowd taunting with such phrases as “Grant does it up the nose, doo dah, doo dah" while one fan held up a plastic bag with white powder behind him when he was on the bench. Returning to the Oilers in February, he recorded a shutout against the New Jersey Devils; he ultimately went 6–4–3 with one shutout. Prior to Game 1 of the 1991 Stanley Cup playoffs, Fuhr was tabbed by Oilers head coach John Muckler to start against the Calgary Flames over Ranford and allowed just one goal in the 3–1 win; Fuhr ultimately started 16 of the 18 postseason games as the Oilers lost to the Minnesota North Stars in the Conference Finals.

=== Post-Oilers career (1991–2000) ===
On September 19, 1991, Fuhr was traded to the Toronto Maple Leafs in a seven-player deal. The 1991–92 season saw him set a career and league high for losses with 33 in a 25–33–5 campaign that saw him lead the league in goals allowed with 230. After a season and a half in Toronto, with the emergence of Felix Potvin, Grant was traded again, this time to the Buffalo Sabres, on February 2, 1993.

In Buffalo, he played a role in the Sabres' dramatic first-round playoff victory over the Boston Bruins, helped instill a winning attitude in the organization, and mentored a still relatively inexperienced Dominik Hašek. Focusing on conditioning, Fuhr then had a successful 1993–94 season with the Sabres, initially sharing goaltending duties with Hašek. Fuhr and Hašek were awarded the William M. Jennings Trophy for the fewest goals allowed that year. Hasek was tabbed to start the Stanley Cup playoffs by head coach John Muckler, a move that did not please Fuhr, who later stated during the 1994–95 NHL lockout that he wanted out of Buffalo. Hašek became the Sabres' full-time starting goaltender after Fuhr suffered multiple injuries.

In May 1993, while a member of the Sabres, Fuhr was denied membership in the neighbouring Transit Valley Country Club. At the time, rumours floated that the denial was based on race, as several of Fuhr's white teammates had been granted membership. Club officials denied they rejected Fuhr based on his race; rather, his application contained "incorrect and incomplete" information. Various acts of vandalism at the club occurred after news of Fuhr's rejection surfaced, including an incident where vandals burned a swastika onto one of the greens. In light of the negative publicity, the club reversed its position and offered Fuhr not only membership but an apology as well. Fuhr rejected the membership and joined the nearby Lancaster Country Club. The club also temporarily suspended its membership committee and had an anti-bias policy written into its by-laws.

Fuhr played in just 17 games of the 1994–95 season. With Hašek now ensconced in the Sabres net, Fuhr was dealt to the Los Angeles Kings on February 14, 1995, reuniting him with Gretzky. His time in Los Angeles proved dismal, as he went 1–7–3 in his starts.

During the summer Grant signed as an unrestricted free agent with the St. Louis Blues on July 14, 1995, just a few months before the 1995–96 season. Although he began the season out of shape and was considered to be past his prime, his career saw a resurgence as he played 79 games that season, including 76 consecutively, both NHL records. On November 30, 1995, Fuhr earned his 300th career win versus the Winnipeg Jets with a 4–1 road win at the Winnipeg Arena in Winnipeg; he became the 11th goaltender to achieve the mark, doing so in his 581st game as a starter. Fuhr and Gretzky became teammates for the third time when the Blues acquired Gretzky in a trade with the Kings on February 27, 1996. The 1996 playoff run for Fuhr ended prematurely in Game 2 of the first round as the result an injury that occurred when a cross-check of Maple Leafs forward Nick Kypreos by Chris Pronger saw Fuhr's leg twisted in the resulting collision that saw Fuhr tear his right ACL. While the Blues (as goaltended by Jon Casey) won the first round matchup, they were eliminated by Detroit in the next round. Amidst fears that the injury would end his career, Fuhr returned to play 73 games in the 1996–97 season, going 33–27–11 with a 2.72 GAA. In February 1999, Fuhr had his second operation on his right knee in the span of a year to repair cartilage damage. He returned in March and started all but one of the subsequent playoff run that saw the Blues lose in the second round. After the Blues made a deal to acquire Roman Turek as their new number-one goaltender on June 19, 1999, Fuhr was traded to the Calgary Flames on September 5, 1999. His 108 wins as a Blues goaltender were third most in team history (behind only Mike Liut and Curtis Joseph) at the time of the trade.

He spent one season there being a mentor for Calgary's young goaltenders, including Fred Brathwaite, and on October 22, 1999, he earned his 400th career win against the Florida Panthers with a 3–2 road win in overtime, becoming the sixth goaltender to achieve the mark (doing so on his 799th start). Ailing knees led to him missing 25 games. On April 5, 2000, following a 6–5 loss to St. Louis, which statistically eliminated the Flames from playoff contention that postseason, Fuhr announced that he would retire after the 1999–2000 season. He signed a deal for $200,000 in the offseason in a move meant to protect one of the team's goalies in the expansion draft. Fuhr attempted to make a comeback plan in August, but his plans proved to be short-lived. Fuhr would officially retire as a player from the National Hockey League on September 6, 2000, and he subsequently became an assistant coach with the Flames.

== International play ==
Fuhr was named to the 1984 Canada Cup team but saw limited action during the tournament due to an injury. Fuhr was again selected to represent Canada in the 1987 Canada Cup. It was here that he cemented his reputation as one of the best goaltenders in the game. Playing against a tough Soviet Union squad, Fuhr turned away shot after shot during the three-game final. After the Edmonton Oilers were eliminated by the Los Angeles Kings in the 1st round of the 1989 Stanley Cup Playoffs, Grant also played for Team Canada at the 1989 World Championships where he won a silver medal.

== Post-playing career ==
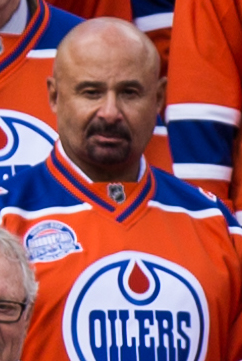
Grant Fuhr during the Farewell of Rexall Place (2016)

Fuhr was hired to be the Phoenix Coyotes goaltending coach on July 22, 2004. Fuhr held the position until the end of the 2008–09 season when he was replaced by Sean Burke. He held a similar post with the Calgary Flames in the 2000–2001 and 2001–2002 seasons.

In 2015, Fuhr collaborated on his biography with Bruce Dowbiggin, Grant Fuhr: The Story of a Hockey Legend.

In 2022, Fuhr began doing radio and television broadcasting for the Coachella Valley Firebirds, the American Hockey League affiliate of the Seattle Kraken, and joined the 3ICE 3-on-3 professional ice hockey summer league as a coach.

== Personal life ==
Fuhr married Lisa Cavanaugh in the Cayman Islands on September 14, 2014. He has four children from previous marriages and a step-daughter.

Fuhr was a regular competitor at the American Century Championship, an annual competition to determine the best golfers among American sports and entertainment celebrities. The tournament is played at Edgewood Tahoe Golf Course along the edge of Lake Tahoe.

== Career statistics ==
=== Regular season and playoffs ===
Bold indicates led league

			Regular season									Playoffs
Season	Team	League	GP	W	L	T	MIN	GA	SO	GAA	SV%	GP	W	L	MIN	GA	SO	GAA	SV%
1979–80	Victoria Cougars	WHL	43	30	12	0	2488	130	3	3.14	.911	8	5	3	465	22	0	2.84	—
1980–81	Victoria Cougars	WHL	59	48	9	1	3448	160	4	2.78	.908	15	12	3	899	45	1	3.00	—
1980–81	Victoria Cougars	M-Cup	—	—	—	—	—	—	—	—	—	4	1	3	239	18	0	4.52	—
1981–82	Edmonton Oilers	NHL	48	28	5	**14**	2847	157	0	3.31	.899	5	2	3	309	26	0	5.05	.852
1982–83	Edmonton Oilers	NHL	32	13	12	5	1803	129	0	4.29	.868	1	0	0	11	0	0	0.00	1.000
1982–83	Moncton Alpines	AHL	10	4	5	1	604	40	0	3.97	—	—	—	—	—	—	—	—	—
1983–84	Edmonton Oilers	NHL	45	**30**	10	4	2625	171	1	3.91	.883	16	11	4	882	44	1	3.00	.910
1984–85	Edmonton Oilers	NHL	46	26	8	7	2559	165	1	3.87	.884	**18**	**15**	3	**1057**	55	0	3.12	.895
1985–86	Edmonton Oilers	NHL	40	29	8	0	2184	143	0	3.93	.890	9	5	4	540	28	0	3.12	.897
1986–87	Edmonton Oilers	NHL	44	22	13	3	2388	137	0	3.44	.881	19	14	5	1143	47	0	2.47	.908
1987–88	Edmonton Oilers	NHL	**75**	40	24	**9**	**4304**	**246**	**4**	3.43	.881	**19**	**16**	2	**1136**	55	0	2.91	.883
1988–89	Edmonton Oilers	NHL	59	23	26	6	3341	213	1	3.83	.875	7	3	4	417	24	1	3.45	.894
1989–90	Edmonton Oilers	NHL	21	9	7	3	1081	70	1	3.89	.868	—	—	—	—	—	—	—	—
1989–90	Cape Breton Oilers	AHL	2	2	0	0	120	6	0	3.00	.919	—	—	—	—	—	—	—	—
1990–91	Edmonton Oilers	NHL	13	6	4	3	778	39	1	3.01	.897	18	8	7	1019	51	0	3.00	.895
1990–91	Cape Breton Oilers	AHL	4	2	2	0	240	17	0	4.25	.870	—	—	—	—	—	—	—	—
1991–92	Toronto Maple Leafs	NHL	66	25	**33**	5	3774	**230**	2	3.66	.881	—	—	—	—	—	—	—	—
1992–93	Toronto Maple Leafs	NHL	29	13	9	4	1665	87	1	3.14	.895	—	—	—	—	—	—	—	—
1992–93	Buffalo Sabres	NHL	29	11	15	2	1694	98	0	3.47	.891	8	3	4	474	27	1	3.42	.875
1993–94	Buffalo Sabres	NHL	32	13	12	3	1726	106	2	3.68	.883	—	—	—	—	—	—	—	—
1993–94	Rochester Americans	AHL	5	3	0	2	310	10	0	1.94	.935	—	—	—	—	—	—	—	—
1994–95	Buffalo Sabres	NHL	3	1	2	0	180	12	0	4.00	.859	—	—	—	—	—	—	—	—
1994–95	Los Angeles Kings	NHL	14	1	7	3	698	47	0	4.04	.876	—	—	—	—	—	—	—	—
1995–96	St. Louis Blues	NHL	**79**	30	28	16	4365	209	3	2.87	.903	2	1	0	69	1	0	0.87	.978
1996–97	St. Louis Blues	NHL	73	33	27	11	4261	193	3	2.72	.901	6	2	4	357	13	2	2.18	.929
1997–98	St. Louis Blues	NHL	58	29	21	6	3274	138	3	2.53	.883	10	6	4	615	28	0	2.73	.906
1998–99	St. Louis Blues	NHL	39	16	11	8	2193	89	2	2.44	.892	13	6	6	780	31	1	2.35	.898
1999–2000	Calgary Flames	NHL	23	5	13	2	1205	77	0	3.83	.856	—	—	—	—	—	—	—	—
1999–2000	Saint John Flames	AHL	2	0	2	0	99	10	0	6.05	.839	—	—	—	—	—	—	—	—
NHL totals			868	403	295	114	48,945	2,756	25	3.38	.887	150	92	50	8,808	430	6	2.93	.898

=== International ===
Year	Team	Event	GP	W	L	T	MIN	GA	SO	GAA
1984	Canada	CC	2	1	0	1	120	6	0	3.00
1987	Canada	CC	9	6	1	2	575	32	0	3.34
1989	Canada	WC	5	1	3	1	298	18	1	3.62
Senior totals			16	8	4	4	993	56	1	3.38

== Awards and honours ==
- President's Cup champion (1981)
- WHL First All-Star Team (1980, 1981)
- NHL All-Star Game selection (1982, 1984, 1985, 1986, 1988, 1989)
- Canada Cup All-Star Team (1987)
- First All-Star Team (1988)
- Vezina Trophy (1988)
- Second All-Star Team (1982)
- Stanley Cup champion (1984, 1985, 1987, 1988, 1990)
- William M. Jennings Trophy (Shared with Dominik Hašek) (1994)
- In 1998, he was ranked number 70 on The Hockey News' list of the 100 Greatest Hockey Players.
- His no. 31 was retired by the Edmonton Oilers on October 9, 2003.
- Inducted into the Hockey Hall of Fame in 2003.
- Inducted into the Alberta Sports Hall of Fame in 2004.
- Named one of the 100 Greatest NHL Players in 2017.

== Legacy ==
In his autobiography, Fuhr summarized his theory of goaltending as such:

The minute you think about what you’re doing as a goalie, you’re lost. Playing goalie, you can’t think the game, you have to play the game.

Fuhr was inducted into the Hockey Hall of Fame on November 2, 2003.

Teammate Wayne Gretzky has said on many occasions that he believes Fuhr is the greatest goaltender in NHL history, stating as such as for the 2003 DVD "Ultimate Gretzky".

In 2022, The Athletic named Fuhr as the 71st best player of modern NHL history.

== Records ==
- Holds NHL record for most assists and points by a goaltender in regular season and playoffs combined – 61
- Holds NHL record for longest undefeated streak by a goaltender in his first NHL season – 23 in 1981–82
- Holds NHL record for most assists in a single season by a goaltender – 14 in 1983–84
- Holds NHL record for most games played by a goaltender in a single season – 79 in 1995–96
- Holds NHL record for most consecutive appearances in a single season by a goaltender – 76 in 1996

== See also ==
- List of black NHL players
- List of NHL goaltenders with 300 wins

Preceded by Paul Coffey	Edmonton Oilers first-round draft pick 1981	Succeeded by Jim Playfair
Preceded by Ron Hextall	Winner of the Vezina Trophy; 1988	Succeeded by Patrick Roy
Preceded by Ed Belfour	Winner of the William M. Jennings Trophy; 1994; With: Dominik Hašek	Succeeded by Ed Belfour
