= Brian Hayward =

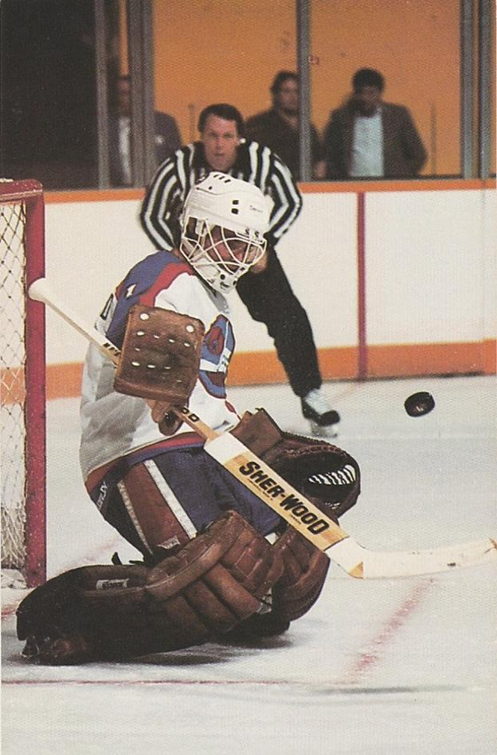
- Born: June 25, 1960 (age 66) Georgetown, Ontario, Canada
- Height: 5 ft 10 in (178 cm)
- Weight: 175 lb (79 kg; 12 st 7 lb)
- Position: Goaltender
- Caught: Left
- Played for: Winnipeg Jets; Montreal Canadiens; Minnesota North Stars; San Jose Sharks
- NHL draft: Undrafted
- Playing career: 1982–1993

Brian George Hayward (born June 25, 1960) is a Canadian former professional ice hockey goaltender who is a color commentator for Anaheim Ducks broadcasts on Prime Video and KCOP-TV.

== Playing career ==
Hayward played college hockey at Cornell University from 1978–1982. In his senior season he was named first-team All-Ivy, All-ECAC and was an All-American. He set a school record with 2,225 saves and had a career won-lost record of 42-27-2.

Undrafted, Hayward signed a free agent contract with the Winnipeg Jets and moved between the Jets and their AHL affiliate for several years before becoming a regular NHL player. In 1984–85 he won a career high 33 games, setting a franchise record. He was traded to the Montreal Canadiens on August 19, 1986, for Steve Penney and Swedish prospect Jan Ingman before the 1986–87 season, and he then played with Patrick Roy. For three consecutive seasons they shared the William M. Jennings Trophy, awarded to the team that allows the fewest goals during the regular season. In 1990 he was traded to the Minnesota North Stars where he played for one season. In 1991, he was acquired by the San Jose Sharks in the Dispersal Draft and he was in net for the Sharks when they won their first NHL regular season game, against the Calgary Flames. He retired from playing in 1993.

== Broadcasting career ==
He is the television color commentator for the Anaheim Ducks, a role he served since the team's inception. On December 9, 2024, he celebrated his 2,000th game in that role, when the Ducks faced the Montreal Canadiens. He also occasionally works as a reporter or color commentator for CBC's Hockey Night in Canada. Hayward has also called games for ABC, NBC, ESPN, ESPN2, and NHL International. While at ESPN, he served as color commentator for the 2004 World Cup of Hockey and as a roving reporter during the 1998 playoffs, where he interviewed President Bill Clinton during a game in Washington, D.C. While with NBC, he called games at the 2006 Winter Olympics in Torino, Italy. He also co-hosts Ducks Live, after every Ducks game.

In the 2012 playoffs, Hayward joined the NBCSN as an "Inside-the-Glass" reporter.

== Personal life ==
Hayward currently resides in Anaheim Hills, California with his wife Angela and daughter Courtney.

== Awards and honors ==
Award	Year
All-ECAC Hockey First Team	1981–82
AHCA East All-American	1981–82
William M. Jennings Award (shared with Patrick Roy)	1986–87 1987–88 1988–89

== Career statistics ==
=== Regular season and playoffs ===
			Regular season									Playoffs
Season	Team	League	GP	W	L	T	MIN	GA	SO	GAA	SV%	GP	W	L	MIN	GA	SO	GAA	SV%
1976–77	Markham Waxers	OPJHL	26	—	—	—	1558	107	0	4.11	—	—	—	—	—	—	—	—	—
1977–78	Guelph Platers	OPJHL	—	—	—	—	—	—	—	—	—	—	—	—	—	—	—	—	—
1978–79	Cornell Big Red	ECAC	25	18	6	0	1469	95	0	3.88	—	3	2	1	179	14	0	4.66	—
1979–80	Cornell Big Red	ECAC	12	2	7	0	508	52	0	6.02	—	—	—	—	—	—	—	—	—
1980–81	Cornell Big Red	ECAC	19	11	4	1	967	58	1	3.54	—	4	2	1	181	18	0	4.50	—
1981–82	Cornell Big Red	ECAC	22	11	10	1	1249	66	0	3.17	—	—	—	—	—	—	—	—	—
1982–83	Winnipeg Jets	NHL	24	10	12	2	1440	89	1	3.71	.887	3	0	3	160	14	0	5.25	.831
1982–83	Sherbrooke Jets	AHL	22	6	11	3	1208	89	1	4.42	—	—	—	—	—	—	—	—	—
1983–84	Winnipeg Jets	NHL	28	7	18	2	1530	124	0	4.86	.856	—	—	—	—	—	—	—	—
1983–84	Sherbrooke Jets	AHL	15	4	8	0	781	69	0	5.30	—	—	—	—	—	—	—	—	—
1984–85	Winnipeg Jets	NHL	61	33	17	7	3436	220	0	3.84	.879	6	2	4	309	23	0	4.47	.853
1985–86	Winnipeg Jets	NHL	52	13	28	5	2721	217	0	4.79	.842	2	0	1	68	6	0	5.29	.806
1985–86	Sherbrooke Jets	AHL	3	2	0	1	185	5	0	1.62	—	—	—	—	—	—	—	—	—
1986–87	Montreal Canadiens	NHL	37	19	13	4	2178	102	1	2.81	.894	13	6	5	708	32	0	2.71	.896
1987–88	Montreal Canadiens	NHL	39	22	10	4	2246	107	2	2.86	.896	4	2	2	230	9	0	2.35	.893
1988–89	Montreal Canadiens	NHL	36	20	13	3	2091	101	1	2.90	.887	2	1	1	124	7	0	3.38	.870
1989–90	Montreal Canadiens	NHL	29	10	12	6	1674	94	1	3.37	.878	1	0	0	33	2	0	3.69	.889
1990–91	Minnesota North Stars	NHL	26	6	15	3	1473	77	2	3.14	.886	6	0	2	171	11	0	3.86	.853
1990–91	Kalamazoo Wings	IHL	2	2	0	0	120	5	0	2.50	—	—	—	—	—	—	—	—	—
1991–92	San Jose Sharks	NHL	7	1	4	0	305	25	0	4.92	.859	—	—	—	—	—	—	—	—
1991–92	Kansas City Blades	IHL	2	1	1	0	119	3	1	1.51	—	—	—	—	—	—	—	—	—
1992–93	San Jose Sharks	NHL	18	2	14	1	930	86	0	5.55	.846	—	—	—	—	—	—	—	—
NHL totals			357	143	156	37	20,023	1242	8	3.72	.873	37	11	18	1802	104	0	3.46	.872

"Hayward's stats". The Goaltender Home Page.

Awards and achievements
Preceded by Bob Froese, Darren Jensen	Winner of the William M. Jennings Trophy; 1987–1989 (with Patrick Roy)	Succeeded by Andy Moog, Réjean Lemelin
