= Andy Moog =

Canadian ice hockey player (born 1960)

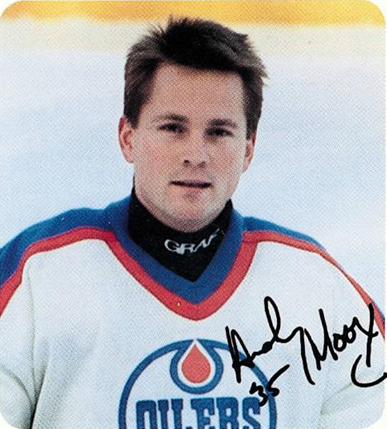
- Moog with the Edmonton Oilers in 1986
- Born: February 18, 1960 (age 66) Penticton, British Columbia, Canada
- Height: 5 ft 8 in (173 cm)
- Weight: 170 lb (77 kg; 12 st 2 lb)
- Position: Goaltender
- Caught: Left
- Played for: Edmonton Oilers; Boston Bruins; Dallas Stars; Montreal Canadiens
- National team: Canada
- NHL draft: 132nd overall, 1980; Edmonton Oilers
- Playing career: 1980–1998

Donald Andrew Moog (/moʊɡ/; born February 18, 1960) is a Canadian former professional ice hockey goaltender. Moog played in the National Hockey League (NHL) for the Edmonton Oilers, Boston Bruins, Dallas Stars and Montreal Canadiens, and also for the Canadian national team. Moog is a three-time Stanley Cup champion: 1984, 1985 and 1987. He earned the William M. Jennings Trophy in the 1989–90 NHL season for fewest total goals against the team during the regular season, sharing the trophy with his goaltending partner, Réjean Lemelin.

Moog spent the 2009–10 season as an assistant coach for the Dallas Stars.

== Playing career ==
=== Junior ===
After playing minor hockey in Penticton, Andy Moog advanced to the junior ranks, first in the B.C. Junior Hockey League, and then on to the Billings Bighorns of the Western Hockey League (WHL), where he was named a WHL all star in 1979–80. Moog's talents caught the eye of the NHL's Edmonton Oilers, who made Moog their sixth pick – 132nd overall – in the 1980 NHL entry draft.

=== Edmonton Oilers ===
Moog was drafted by the Edmonton Oilers on June 11, 1980, and spent most of the season in the minors, until injuries to goaltenders Ron Low and Eddie Mio forced him into action late in the season. That year he was spectacular in a three-game first round sweep of the Montreal Canadiens. The following year, Moog was expected to share goaltending duties with Low, but then a 19-year-old Grant Fuhr surprisingly made the team straight out of training camp. Moog was once again relegated to the minors, appearing in only eight NHL games that season.

In 1982–83, Oilers general manager and coach Glen Sather decided to go with the young duo of Moog and Fuhr and traded Low. Moog who played 50 games in the regular season gathering a impressive 33-8-7 record was given the starting job in the playoffs, and helped lead the Oilers to their first Stanley Cup Finals, though they were swept by the New York Islanders, who captured their fourth straight Stanley Cup. The next year Moog played in a back up role only playing in 38 games but would once again boast a winning record but Sather chose to go with Fuhr in the 1984 playoffs. However Fuhr was injured in the third game of the Stanley Cup Final in a rematch against the Islanders. Moog stepped in and led the Oilers to a series win. Moog would win a second Stanley Cup in a back up role the following 1984-85 season.

During the 1985-86 and 1986-87 seasons Moog and Fuhr continued to nearly evenly split the goaltending duties, with Moog playing just 1 game more than Fuhr in 1986 and 2 more than his teammate in 1987. Moog played well both seasons, boasting a heavy winning record both years. However, when it came to the postseason, Fuhr was the one to get the nod as the Oilers won the Stanley Cup once again in 1987. After demanding a trade, Moog walked out on the Oilers in 1987 to play for Team Canada at the Calgary Winter Olympics. There, Moog and Sean Burke played four games each, with Canada finishing fourth. Overall Moog played 31 career games for Team Canada. Glen Sather offered to trade Moog to the Pittsburgh Penguins for Steve Guenette and a first round draft pick, but Penguins owner Edward J. DeBartolo, Sr. told his general manager, Eddie Johnston, that he could not trade a first round draft pick.

=== Boston Bruins ===
At the trading deadline of the 1987–88 season, Moog was dealt to the Boston Bruins for Bill Ranford, Geoff Courtnall, and a 2nd Round Draft pick (39th Overall) in the 1988 NHL entry draft (RW - Petro Koivunen (1970 - )) on March 8, 1988, shortly after the 1988 Winter Olympics in Calgary. The Bruins implemented a goalie tandem, with Moog and Réjean Lemelin sharing starting duties. Lemelin was in goal for most of the action during the team's run to the Stanley Cup Final in 1988, as Boston was swept by the Oilers in four games — Edmonton's fourth Cup title in five years. Moog was in goal for the series' final game. During the 1989-90 season the duo would have a dominant season resulting in winning the William M. Jennings Trophy for allowing the fewest number of goals. Despite Lemelin initially starting in net during the 1990 playoffs, after the Bruins had won the Presidents' Trophy for having the best regular season record in the NHL, Moog eventually took over the starting position. After a few games and performing heroics, Moog's team went all of the way to the 1990 Stanley Cup Final.

A highlight for Moog in the 1990 NHL playoffs was the first round against the Hartford Whalers. With Hartford leading two games to one and leading in game four by a 5–2 score entering the third period, Moog replaced Lemelin in goal and shut out the Whalers for the remainder of the game. The Bruins rallied for a comeback by scoring four goals in the third period. In the 1990 Stanley Cup Finals, the Bruins lost in five games to Moog's old team, Edmonton, who were backstopped by Ranford.

In both the 1991 and 1992 Stanley Cup playoffs, the Bruins defeated the Canadiens in the second round to make it to the Prince of Wales Conference Final. Moog soon gained a reputation as the Bruins' biggest "Hab-killer", shutting out the Canadiens as part of a sweep in the 1992 postseason. However, the Bruins lost both series to the Pittsburgh Penguins who were led by Mario Lemieux. In 1991, Boston took the first two games of the series, but Pittsburgh went on to win the next four games and the series, followed by a Penguins win of the Stanley Cup. Again in 1992, Boston was no match for Pittsburgh and was swept in four games during the Conference Final.

In the 1992–93 season, Moog did not start well, partly because of a poor relationship with new head coach Brian Sutter, and partly because of the death of his father in January 1993. After the rough start, things improved and Moog backstopped his team to the Adams Division title and the second-best record overall, behind Pittsburgh. Moog boasted a career best 37 wins and finished the season strong being the runner-up for the William Jennings Trophy. The 1993 playoffs, however, were a disaster. Boston was unexpectedly swept by the Buffalo Sabres, three of the four losses coming in overtime. In the final game of the series Moog gave up the overtime goal to the Sabres' Brad May.

As of 2019, Moog ranks third on the Bruins' list of playoff wins by a goaltender with 36, behind Tuukka Rask at 50 and Gerry Cheevers who has 53.

During the middle and latter years of his career, Moog served as vice-president of the National Hockey League Players' Association. This position made him a spokesman for the players, both during the 1992 NHL players strike and the 1994–95 NHL lockout.

Moog's Bruins mask was voted one of the scariest goalie masks by The Hockey News.

=== Dallas Stars ===
Moog was traded to the Minnesota North Stars for goaltender Jon Casey on June 25, 1993, who relocated to Dallas as the Dallas Stars for the 1993–94 season. He led them to a winning record to return the Stars to the playoffs, where they reached the second round. In the 1996–97 NHL season, Moog had a 2.15 GAA the lowest of his career along with a 28–13–5 record he helped Dallas to the Central Division title, but they were upset in the first round in seven games by the underdog Edmonton Oilers. During his time with the Stars, Moog often shared the workload of regular season games with Darcy Wakaluk and later Artūrs Irbe.

On March 18, 1994 in a game vs the Washington Capitals Moog became just the 10th goalie in NHL history to win 300 games.

=== Montreal Canadiens and retirement ===
With the Stars bringing in Ed Belfour on July 2, 1997, Moog signed as a free agent with the Montreal Canadiens on July 17, 1997, for the 1997–98 NHL season. While Moog had helped eliminate Montreal from the playoffs five times (once with the Oilers in 1980, and four times with the Bruins in 1988, 1990, 1991, and 1992), he led the Habs to their first playoff series win since 1993. In the summer of 1998, Moog was offered a contract to play for the Vancouver Canucks, but he chose to retire on June 22, 1998, and instead became the team's goaltending coach.

Moog was selected to play in the National Hockey League All-Star Game four times over his career, twice with the Oilers (1985 and 1986), and once each with the Bruins (1991), and Stars (1997). In his two All-Star appearances as an Oiler, both he and Fuhr were selected to the team.

== Post-playing career ==
Following his playing career, Moog briefly served as a goalie consultant for the Atlanta Thrashers in 1999 before taking a job closer to his hometown with the Vancouver Canucks where he spent 3 seasons.

in 1998 Moog purchased the Fort Worth (WPHL/CHL) expansion franchise. He became the team's president and managing general partner in June 1998 he held the position till 2002, and retained his minority ownership of franchise into 2003-04 season.

Moog served as a goaltending consultant for the gold medal winning Team Canada at the 2002 Winter Olympics. He also served as the goaltending coach for Team Canada at the 2002 IHHF World Championships.

He was honored as a member of the British Columbia hockey hall of fame in 2000. As well as the British Columbia sports hall of fame in 2003.

On August 19, 2005, Team Canada once again appointed Moog as goaltending consultant for the 2006 Winter Olympics team.

Moog served as the Dallas stars player development executive in 2006 but left at the end of the season. Then on September 12, 2009, Moog was named assistant coach of the Dallas Stars. His contract expired July 1, 2010, and he was not offered an extension.

Moog also worked as an on-air analyst for Fox Sports Southwest during Dallas Stars games.

In 2016, Moog Joined the Portland Winterhawks of the Western Hockey League (WHL) as their goaltending coach and remained in that position for seven seasons until he announced his retirement on July 19, 2023, at the age of 63 for health reasons.

== Personal life ==
Moog's parents are Shirley and Don Moog, the latter an amateur goaltender who played for the Penticton Vees when they won the 1955 IIHF World Ice Hockey Championship. Moog’s family house is on the list of Canadas historic places.

Moog has been married to his wife Karla since 1980, they have 3 daughters together.

In the early 1990s, Moog helped fund Moog & Friends Hospice in Penticton.

Vaughn Hockey president Mike Vaughn revealed in November 2023 that Moog had been diagnosed with cancer.

== Awards and achievements ==
- WHL Second All-Star Team – 1979–90
- CHL All star — 1981-82
- Stanley Cup champion – 1983–84, 1984–85, 1986–87
- NHL All-Star Game – 1984–85, 1985–86, 1990–91, 1996–97
- William M. Jennings Trophy – 1989–90 (shared with Réjean Lemelin)
- Bruins Three Stars award – 1989–90, 1991–92
- Named one of the top 100 best Bruins players of all time

Moog is the second-fastest goaltender to reach the 300 win mark, doing so in his 543rd game. He is second only to Jacques Plante (526). He was the fifth goaltender to attain 360 and 370 wins. Moog also has the highest winning percentage of any goaltender not in the Hockey Hall of Fame (.580), tied with Chris Osgood.

== Career statistics ==
=== Regular season and playoffs ===
			Regular season									Playoffs
Season	Team	League	GP	W	L	T	MIN	GA	SO	GAA	SV%	GP	W	L	MIN	GA	SO	GAA	SV%
1976–77	Kamloops Braves	BCJHL	44	18	26	0	2735	173	1	3.81	—	—	—	—	—	—	—	—	—
1977–78	Penticton Vees	BCJHL	38	19	19	0	2280	194	0	5.11	—	—	—	—	—	—	—	—	—
1978–79	Billings Bighorns	WHL	26	13	5	4	1306	90	4	4.13	—	5	1	3	229	21	0	5.50	—
1979–80	Billings Bighorns	WHL	46	23	14	1	2435	149	1	3.67	—	3	2	1	190	10	0	3.16	—
1980–81	Edmonton Oilers	NHL	7	3	3	0	313	20	0	3.83	.882	9	5	4	526	32	0	3.65	.881
1980–81	Wichita Wind	CHL	29	14	13	1	1602	89	0	3.67	—	—	—	—	—	—	—	—	—
1981–82	Edmonton Oilers	NHL	8	3	5	0	399	32	0	4.81	.842	—	—	—	—	—	—	—	—
1981–82	Wichita Wind	CHL	40	23	13	3	2391	119	1	2.99	—	7	3	4	434	23	0	3.18	—
1982–83	Edmonton Oilers	NHL	50	33	8	7	2833	167	1	3.54	.891	16	11	5	949	48	0	3.03	.896
1983–84	Edmonton Oilers	NHL	38	27	8	1	2112	139	1	3.77	.882	7	4	0	263	12	0	2.74	.891
1984–85	Edmonton Oilers	NHL	39	22	9	3	2019	111	1	3.30	.894	2	0	0	20	0	0	0.00	1.000
1985–86	Edmonton Oilers	NHL	47	27	9	7	2664	164	1	3.69	.889	1	1	0	60	1	0	1.00	.963
1986–87	Edmonton Oilers	NHL	46	28	11	3	2461	144	0	3.51	.882	2	2	0	120	8	0	4.00	.784
1987–88	Canada	Intl	27	10	7	5	1438	86	0	3.58	—	—	—	—	—	—	—	—	—
1987–88	Boston Bruins	NHL	6	4	2	0	359	17	1	2.84	.906	7	1	4	354	25	0	4.23	.849
1988–89	Boston Bruins	NHL	41	18	14	8	2482	133	1	3.22	.877	6	4	2	359	14	0	2.34	.897
1989–90	Boston Bruins	NHL	46	24	10	7	2536	122	3	2.89	.893	20	13	7	1195	44	2	2.21	.909
1990–91	Boston Bruins	NHL	51	25	13	9	2844	136	4	2.87	.896	19	10	9	1133	60	0	3.18	.895
1991–92	Boston Bruins	NHL	62	28	22	9	3640	196	1	3.23	.887	15	8	7	866	46	1	3.19	.881
1992–93	Boston Bruins	NHL	55	37	14	3	3194	168	3	3.16	.876	3	0	3	161	14	0	5.22	.791
1993–94	Dallas Stars	NHL	55	24	20	7	3121	170	2	3.27	.894	4	1	3	246	12	0	2.93	.901
1994–95	Dallas Stars	NHL	31	10	12	7	1770	72	2	2.44	.915	5	1	4	277	16	0	3.47	.905
1995–96	Dallas Stars	NHL	41	13	19	7	2228	111	1	2.99	.900	—	—	—	—	—	—	—	—
1996–97	Dallas Stars	NHL	48	28	13	5	2738	98	3	2.15	.913	7	3	4	449	21	0	2.81	.902
1997–98	Montreal Canadiens	NHL	42	18	17	5	2337	97	3	2.49	.905	9	4	5	474	24	1	3.04	.882
NHL totals			713	372	209	88	40,151	2,097	28	3.13	.892	132	68	57	7,452	377	4	3.04	.890

=== International ===
Year	Team	Event	GP	W	L	T	MIN	GA	SO	GAA
1988	Canada	OG	4	4	0	0	240	9	1	2.25

== See also ==
- List of NHL goaltenders with 300 wins

Preceded by Patrick Roy, Brian Hayward	Winner of the Jennings Trophy; 1990; With: Réjean Lemelin	Succeeded by Ed Belfour
