= NHL All-Star team =

Annual National Hockey League honor

NHL All-Star Team
- Sport: Ice hockey
- League: National Hockey League
- Awarded for: Best players at each position as voted by the Professional Hockey Writers' Association

History
- First award: 1930–31

The National Hockey League All-Star teams were first named at the end of the 1930–31 NHL season, to honor the best performers over the season at each position.

Representatives of the Professional Hockey Writers' Association vote for the all-star team at the end of the regular season.

The career leader in selections is Gordie Howe, who was named to a total of 21 all-star teams (12 first, 9 second), all with the Detroit Red Wings. Alexander Ovechkin is the only player in history to be named to both all-star teams in the same season (as a left and right winger respectively) because of a voting error. The career leader for the most selections as a player without being inducted into the Hockey Hall of Fame is John LeClair, who was named to a total of 5 all-star teams (2 first, 3 second). Every winner of the Hart Memorial Trophy for the NHL's most valuable player was selected to one of that season's all-star teams, except Al Rollins in 1954 and Ted Kennedy in 1955 (though Kennedy was named to all-star teams in three prior seasons).

== Selections ==
^	Denotes players who are still active in the NHL
*	Denotes players inducted into the Hockey Hall of Fame
†	Denotes inactive players not yet eligible for Hockey Hall of Fame consideration
Player (X)	Denotes the number of times a player has been selected
**Player** **(in bold text)**	Denotes players who won the Hart Memorial Trophy as the NHL's Most Valuable Player in the same year

=== Early years (1930–31 to 1941–42) ===
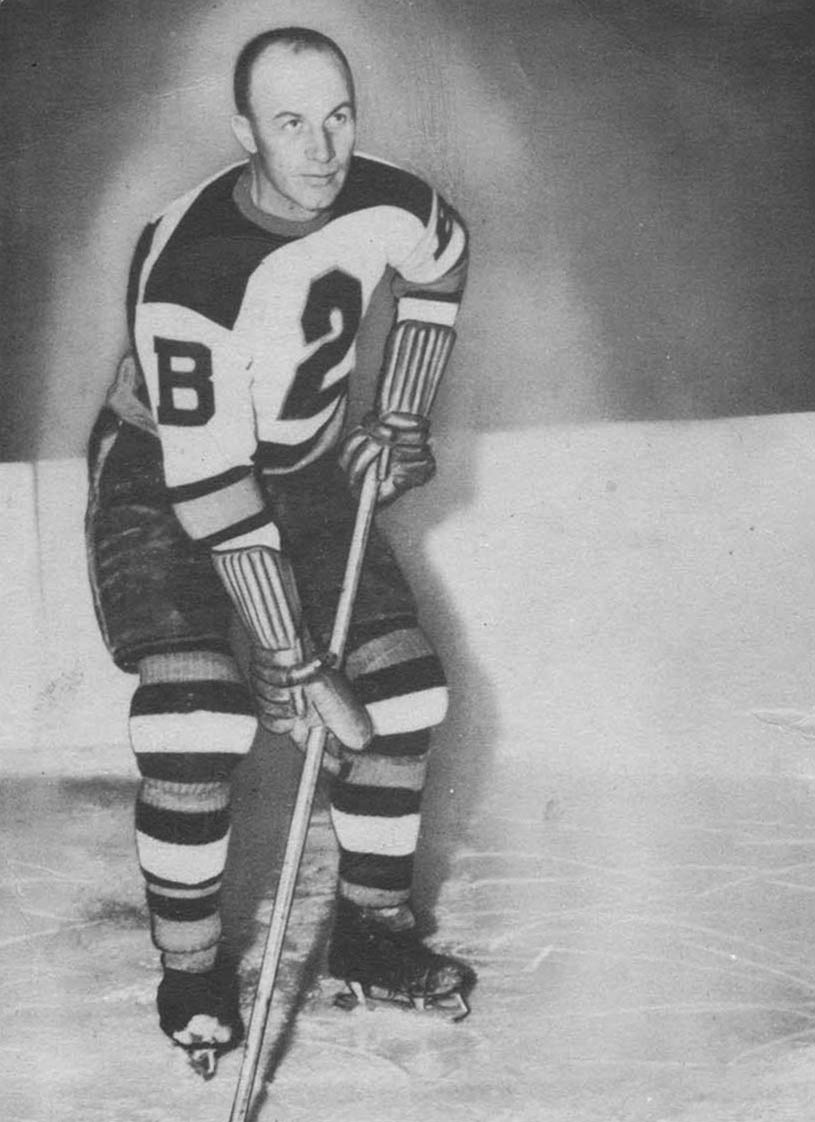
Eddie Shore was selected to the NHL All-Star Team 8 times.

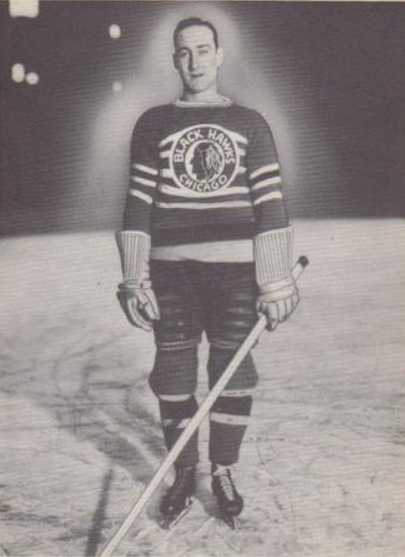
Earl Seibert was selected to the NHL All-Star Team 9 times.

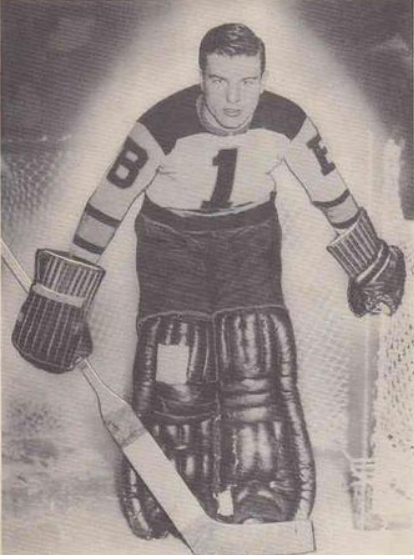
Frank Brimsek was selected to the NHL All-Star Team 8 times.

Season	Pos	First Team		Second Team	
Season	Pos	Player	Team(s)	Player	Team(s)
1930–31	C	**Howie Morenz***	Montreal Canadiens	Frank Boucher*	New York Rangers
1930–31	LW	Aurele Joliat*	Montreal Canadiens	Bun Cook*	New York Rangers
1930–31	RW	Bill Cook*	New York Rangers	Dit Clapper*	Boston Bruins
1930–31	D	King Clancy*	Toronto Maple Leafs	Ching Johnson*	New York Rangers
1930–31	D	Eddie Shore*	Boston Bruins	Sylvio Mantha*	Montreal Canadiens
1930–31	G	Charlie Gardiner*	Chicago Black Hawks	Tiny Thompson*	Boston Bruins
1930–31	Coach	Lester Patrick* (Note: Lester Patrick was inducted into the Hockey Hall of Fame in the player category in 1947.)	New York Rangers	Dick Irvin* (Note: Dick Irvin was inducted into the Hockey Hall of Fame in the player category in 1958.)	Chicago Black Hawks
1931–32	C	**Howie Morenz*** (2)	Montreal Canadiens	Hooley Smith*	Montreal Maroons
1931–32	LW	Busher Jackson*	Toronto Maple Leafs	Aurele Joliat* (2)	Montreal Canadiens
1931–32	RW	Bill Cook* (2)	New York Rangers	Charlie Conacher*	Toronto Maple Leafs
1931–32	D	Ching Johnson* (2)	New York Rangers	King Clancy* (2)	Toronto Maple Leafs
1931–32	D	Eddie Shore* (2)	Boston Bruins	Sylvio Mantha* (2)	Montreal Canadiens
1931–32	G	Charlie Gardiner* (2)	Chicago Black Hawks	Roy Worters*	New York Americans
1931–32	Coach	Lester Patrick* (2)	New York Rangers	Dick Irvin* (2)	Toronto Maple Leafs
1932–33	C	Frank Boucher* (2)	New York Rangers	Howie Morenz* (3)	Montreal Canadiens
1932–33	LW	Baldy Northcott	Montreal Maroons	Busher Jackson* (2)	Toronto Maple Leafs
1932–33	RW	Bill Cook* (3)	New York Rangers	Charlie Conacher* (2)	Toronto Maple Leafs
1932–33	D	Ching Johnson* (2)	New York Rangers	King Clancy* (3)	Toronto Maple Leafs
1932–33	D	**Eddie Shore*** (3)	Boston Bruins	Lionel Conacher*	Montreal Maroons
1932–33	G	John Roach	Detroit Red Wings	Charlie Gardiner* (3)	Chicago Black Hawks
1932–33	Coach	Lester Patrick* (3)	New York Rangers	Dick Irvin* (3)	Toronto Maple Leafs
1933–34	C	Frank Boucher* (3)	New York Rangers	Joe Primeau*	Toronto Maple Leafs
1933–34	LW	Busher Jackson* (3)	Toronto Maple Leafs	**Aurele Joliat*** (3)	Montreal Canadiens
1933–34	RW	Charlie Conacher* (3)	Toronto Maple Leafs	Bill Cook* (4)	New York Rangers
1933–34	D	King Clancy* (4)	Toronto Maple Leafs	Ching Johnson* (3)	New York Rangers
1933–34	D	Lionel Conacher* (2)	Chicago Black Hawks	Eddie Shore* (4)	Boston Bruins
1933–34	G	Charlie Gardiner* (4)	Chicago Black Hawks	Roy Worters* (2)	New York Americans
1933–34	Coach	Lester Patrick* (4)	New York Rangers	Dick Irvin* (4)	Toronto Maple Leafs
1934–35	C	Frank Boucher* (4)	New York Rangers	Cooney Weiland*	Detroit Red Wings
1934–35	LW	Busher Jackson* (4)	Toronto Maple Leafs	Aurele Joliat* (4)	Montreal Canadiens
1934–35	RW	Charlie Conacher* (4)	Toronto Maple Leafs	Dit Clapper* (2)	Boston Bruins
1934–35	D	Earl Seibert*	New York Rangers	Art Coulter*	Chicago Black Hawks
1934–35	D	**Eddie Shore*** (5)	Boston Bruins	Cy Wentworth	Montreal Maroons
1934–35	G	Lorne Chabot	Chicago Black Hawks	Tiny Thompson* (2)	Boston Bruins
1934–35	Coach	Lester Patrick* (5)	New York Rangers	Dick Irvin* (5)	Toronto Maple Leafs
1935–36	C	Hooley Smith* (2)	Montreal Maroons	Bill Thoms	Toronto Maple Leafs
1935–36	LW	Sweeney Schriner*	New York Americans	Paul Thompson	Chicago Black Hawks
1935–36	RW	Charlie Conacher* (5)	Toronto Maple Leafs	Cecil Dillon	New York Rangers
1935–36	D	**Eddie Shore*** (6)	Boston Bruins	Ebbie Goodfellow*	Detroit Red Wings
1935–36	D	Babe Siebert*	Boston Bruins	Earl Seibert* (2)	New York Rangers; Chicago Black Hawks
1935–36	G	Tiny Thompson* (3)	Boston Bruins	Wilf Cude	Montreal Canadiens
1935–36	Coach	Lester Patrick* (6)	New York Rangers	Tommy Gorman*	Montreal Maroons
1936–37	C	Marty Barry*	Detroit Red Wings	Art Chapman	New York Americans
1936–37	LW	Busher Jackson* (5)	Toronto Maple Leafs	Sweeney Schriner* (2)	New York Americans
1936–37	RW	Larry Aurie	Detroit Red Wings	Cecil Dillon (2)	New York Rangers
1936–37	D	Ebbie Goodfellow* (2)	Detroit Red Wings	Lionel Conacher* (3)	Montreal Maroons
1936–37	D	**Babe Siebert*** (2)	Montreal Canadiens	Earl Seibert* (3)	Chicago Black Hawks
1936–37	G	Normie Smith	Detroit Red Wings	Wilf Cude (2)	Montreal Canadiens
1936–37	Coach	Jack Adams* (Note: Jack Adams was inducted into the Hockey Hall of Fame in the player category in 1959.)	Detroit Red Wings	Cecil Hart	Montreal Canadiens
1937–38	C	Bill Cowley*	Boston Bruins	Syl Apps*	Toronto Maple Leafs
1937–38	LW	Paul Thompson (2)	Chicago Black Hawks	Toe Blake*	Montreal Canadiens
1937–38	RW	Gord Drillon*	Toronto Maple Leafs	No Second Team selection in 1937–38	
1937–38	RW	Cecil Dillon (3)	New York Rangers	No Second Team selection in 1937–38	
1937–38	D	**Eddie Shore*** (7)	Boston Bruins	Art Coulter* (2)	New York Rangers
1937–38	D	Babe Siebert* (3)	Montreal Canadiens	Earl Seibert* (4)	Chicago Black Hawks
1937–38	G	Tiny Thompson* (4)	Boston Bruins	Dave Kerr	New York Rangers
1937–38	Coach	Lester Patrick* (7)	New York Rangers	Art Ross* (Note: Art Ross was inducted into the Hockey Hall of Fame in the player category in 1947.)	Boston Bruins
1938–39	C	Syl Apps* (2)	Toronto Maple Leafs	Neil Colville*	New York Rangers
1938–39	LW	**Toe Blake*** (2)	Montreal Canadiens	Johnny Gottselig	Chicago Black Hawks
1938–39	RW	Gord Drillon* (2)	Toronto Maple Leafs	Bobby Bauer*	Boston Bruins
1938–39	D	Dit Clapper* (3)	Boston Bruins	Art Coulter* (3)	New York Rangers
1938–39	D	Eddie Shore* (8)	Boston Bruins	Earl Seibert* (5)	Chicago Black Hawks
1938–39	G	Frank Brimsek*	Boston Bruins	Earl Robertson	New York Americans
1938–39	Coach	Art Ross* (2)	Boston Bruins	Red Dutton* (Note: Red Dutton was inducted into the Hockey Hall of Fame in the player category in 1958.)	New York Americans
1939–40	C	Milt Schmidt*	Boston Bruins	Neil Colville* (2)	New York Rangers
1939–40	LW	Toe Blake* (3)	Montreal Canadiens	Woody Dumart*	Boston Bruins
1939–40	RW	Bryan Hextall*	New York Rangers	Bobby Bauer* (2)	Boston Bruins
1939–40	D	Dit Clapper* (4)	Boston Bruins	Art Coulter* (4)	New York Rangers
1939–40	D	**Ebbie Goodfellow*** (3)	Detroit Red Wings	Earl Seibert* (6)	Chicago Black Hawks
1939–40	G	Dave Kerr (2)	New York Rangers	Frank Brimsek* (2)	Boston Bruins
1939–40	Coach	Paul Thompson (3)	Chicago Black Hawks	Frank Boucher* (Note: Frank Boucher was inducted into the Hockey Hall of Fame in the player category in 1958.) (5)	New York Rangers
1940–41	C	**Bill Cowley*** (2)	Boston Bruins	Syl Apps* (3)	Toronto Maple Leafs
1940–41	LW	Sweeney Schriner* (3)	Toronto Maple Leafs	Woody Dumart* (2)	Boston Bruins
1940–41	RW	Bryan Hextall* (2)	New York Rangers	Bobby Bauer* (3)	Boston Bruins
1940–41	D	Dit Clapper* (5)	Boston Bruins	Ott Heller	New York Rangers
1940–41	D	Wally Stanowski	Toronto Maple Leafs	Earl Seibert* (7)	Chicago Black Hawks
1940–41	G	Turk Broda*	Toronto Maple Leafs	Frank Brimsek* (3)	Boston Bruins
1940–41	Coach	Cooney Weiland* (Note: Cooney Weiland was inducted into the Hockey Hall of Fame in the player category in 1971.) (2)	Boston Bruins	Dick Irvin* (6)	Montreal Canadiens
1941–42	C	Syl Apps* (4)	Toronto Maple Leafs	Phil Watson	New York Rangers
1941–42	LW	Lynn Patrick*	New York Rangers	Sid Abel*	Detroit Red Wings
1941–42	RW	Bryan Hextall* (3)	New York Rangers	Gord Drillon* (3)	Toronto Maple Leafs
1941–42	D	**Tommy Anderson**	Brooklyn Americans	Pat Egan	Brooklyn Americans
1941–42	D	Earl Seibert* (8)	Chicago Black Hawks	Bucko McDonald	Toronto Maple Leafs
1941–42	G	Frank Brimsek* (4)	Boston Bruins	Turk Broda* (2)	Toronto Maple Leafs
1941–42	Coach	Frank Boucher* (6)	New York Rangers	Paul Thompson (4)	Chicago Black Hawks

=== Original Six era (1942–43 to 1966–67) ===
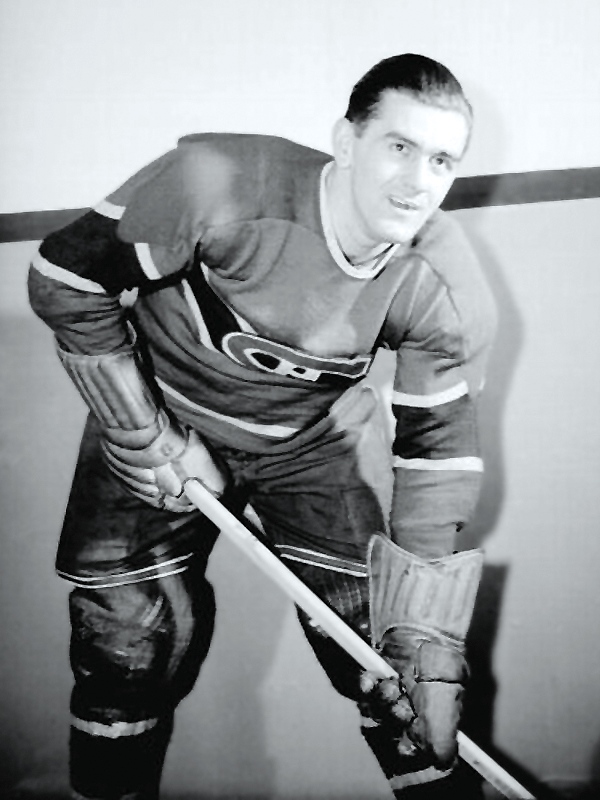
Maurice Richard was selected for the NHL All-Star Team 14 times.

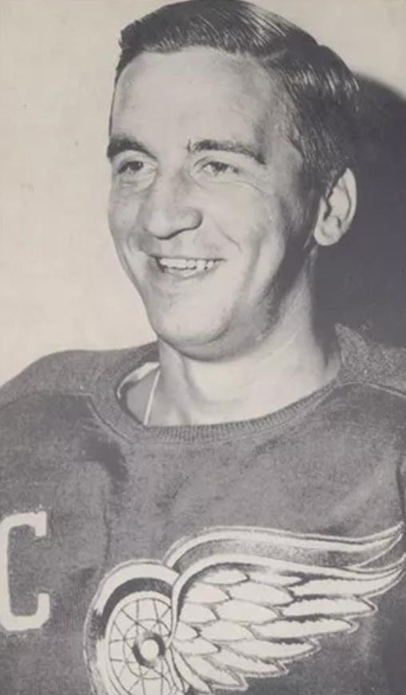
Ted Lindsay was selected for the NHL All-Star Team 9 times.

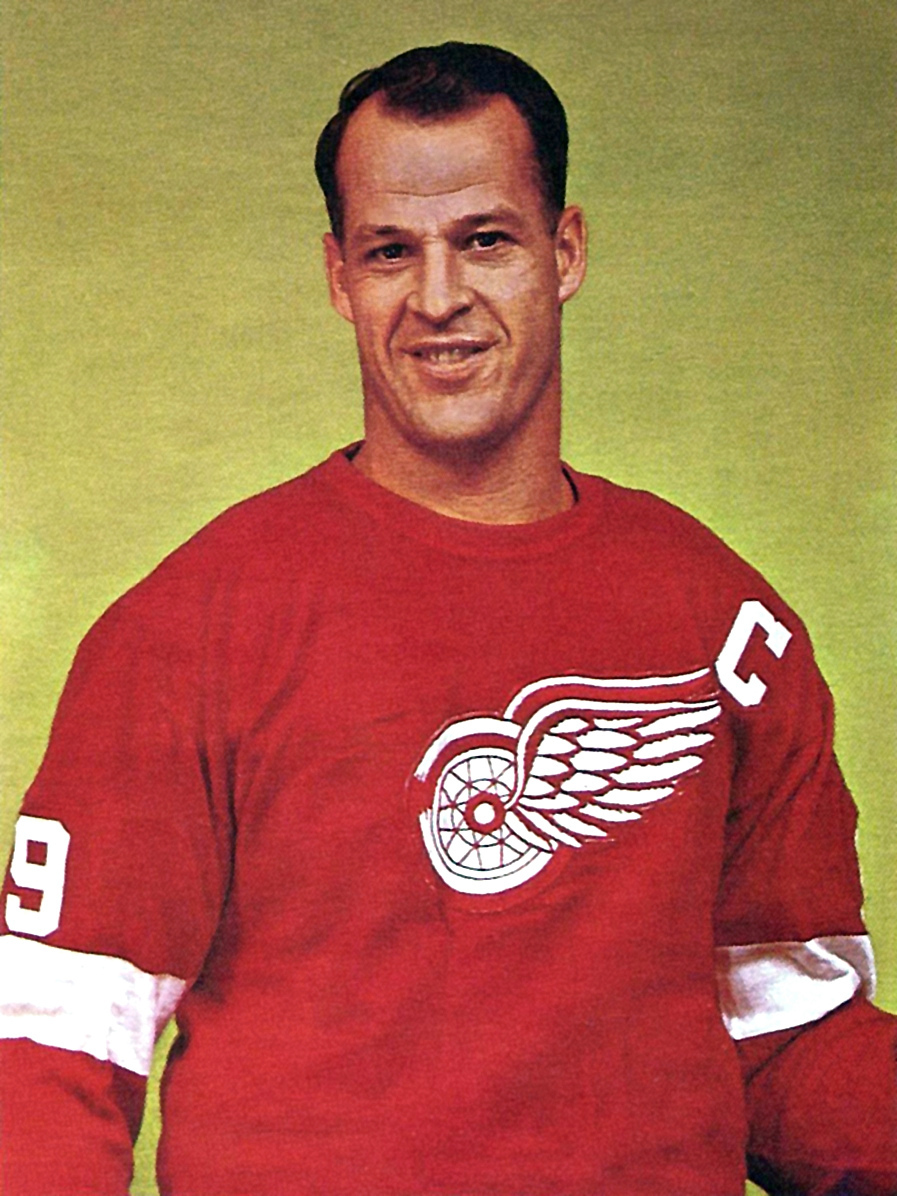
Gordie Howe was selected for the NHL All-Star Team 21 times.

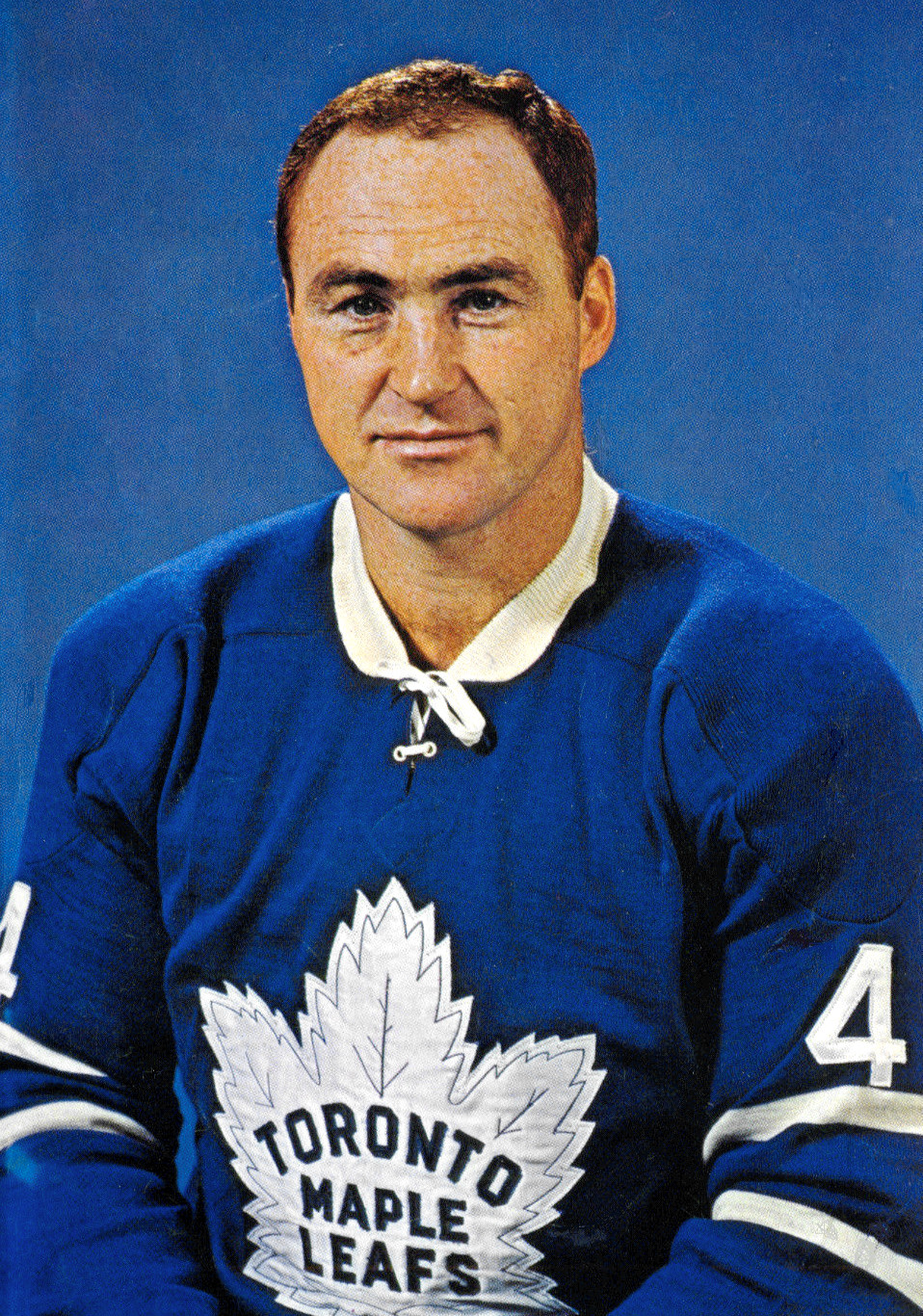
Red Kelly was selected for the NHL All-Star Team 8 times.

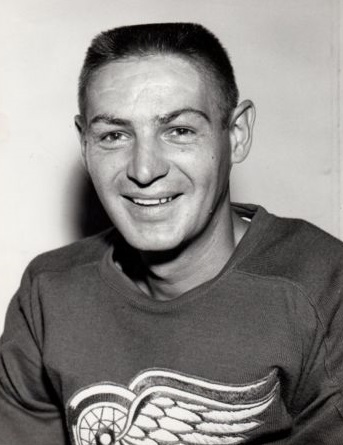
Terry Sawchuk was selected for the NHL All-Star Team 7 times.

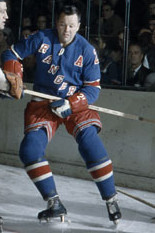
Doug Harvey was selected for the NHL All-Star Team 11 times.

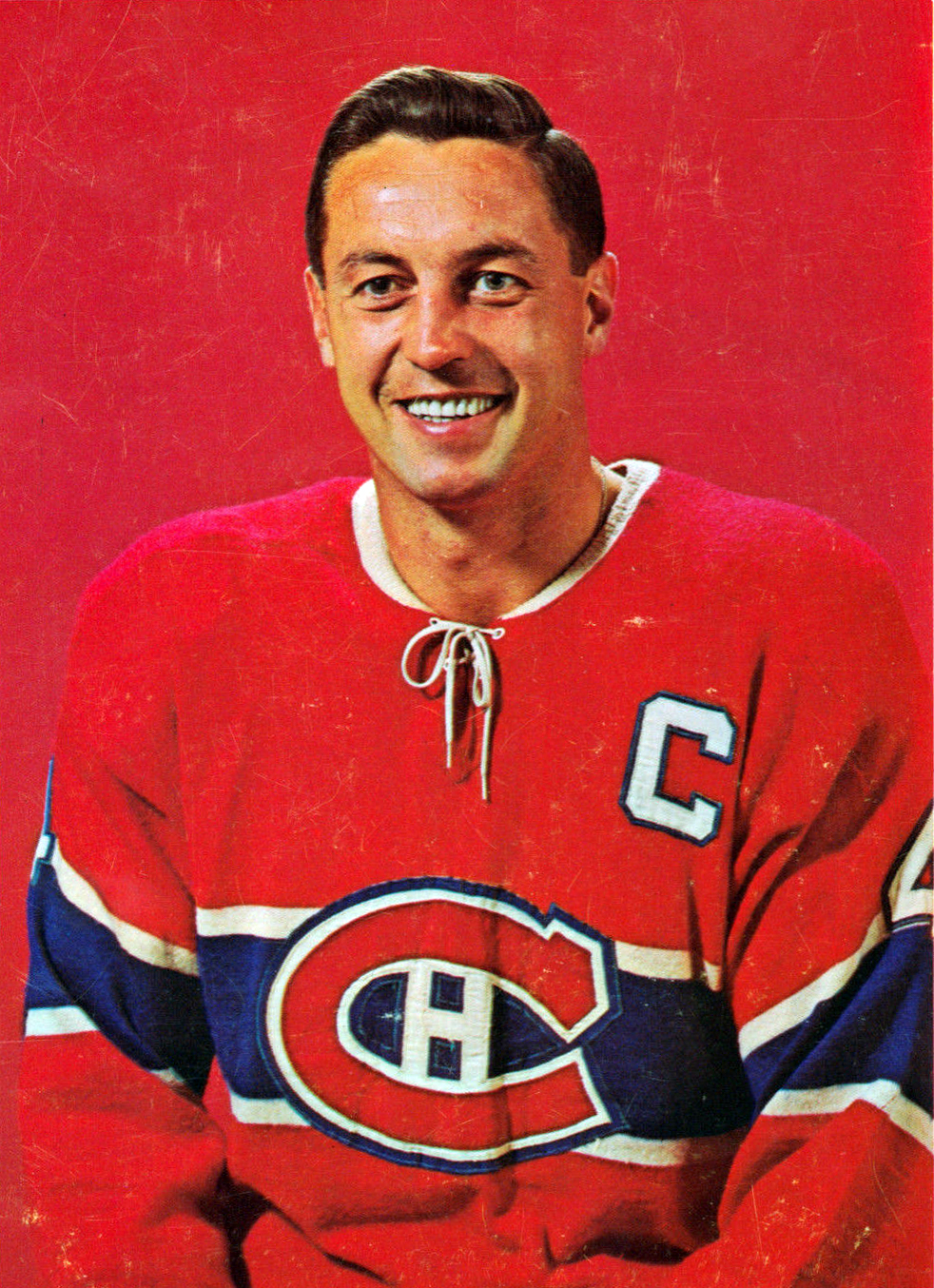
Jean Beliveau was selected for the NHL All-Star Team 10 times.

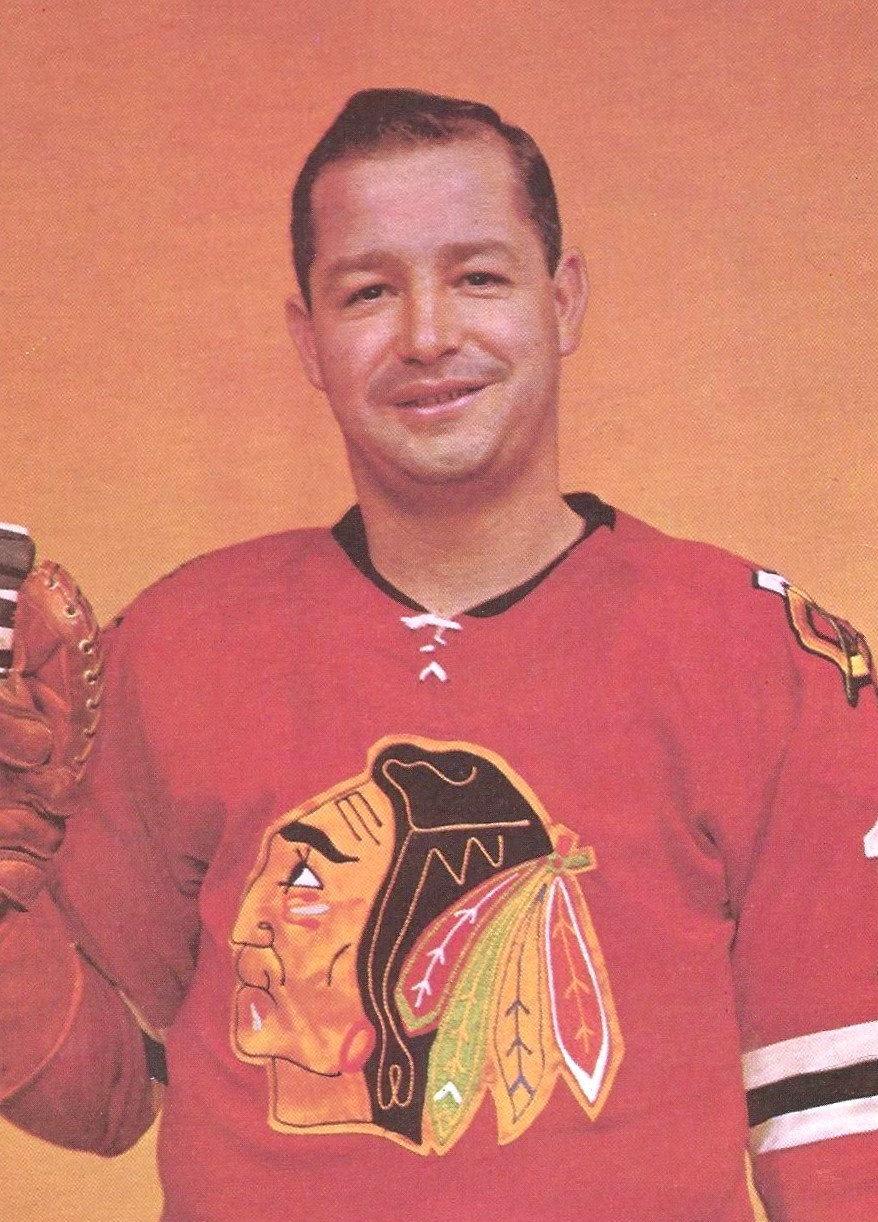
Glenn Hall was selected for the NHL All-Star Team 11 times.

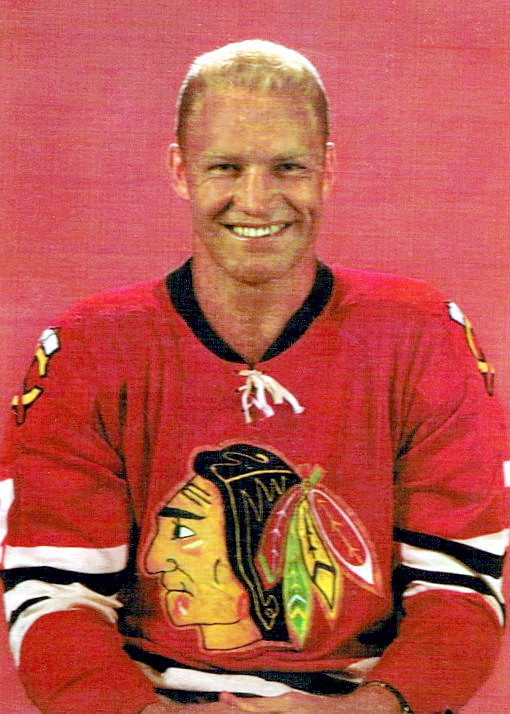
Bobby Hull was selected for the NHL All-Star Team 12 times.

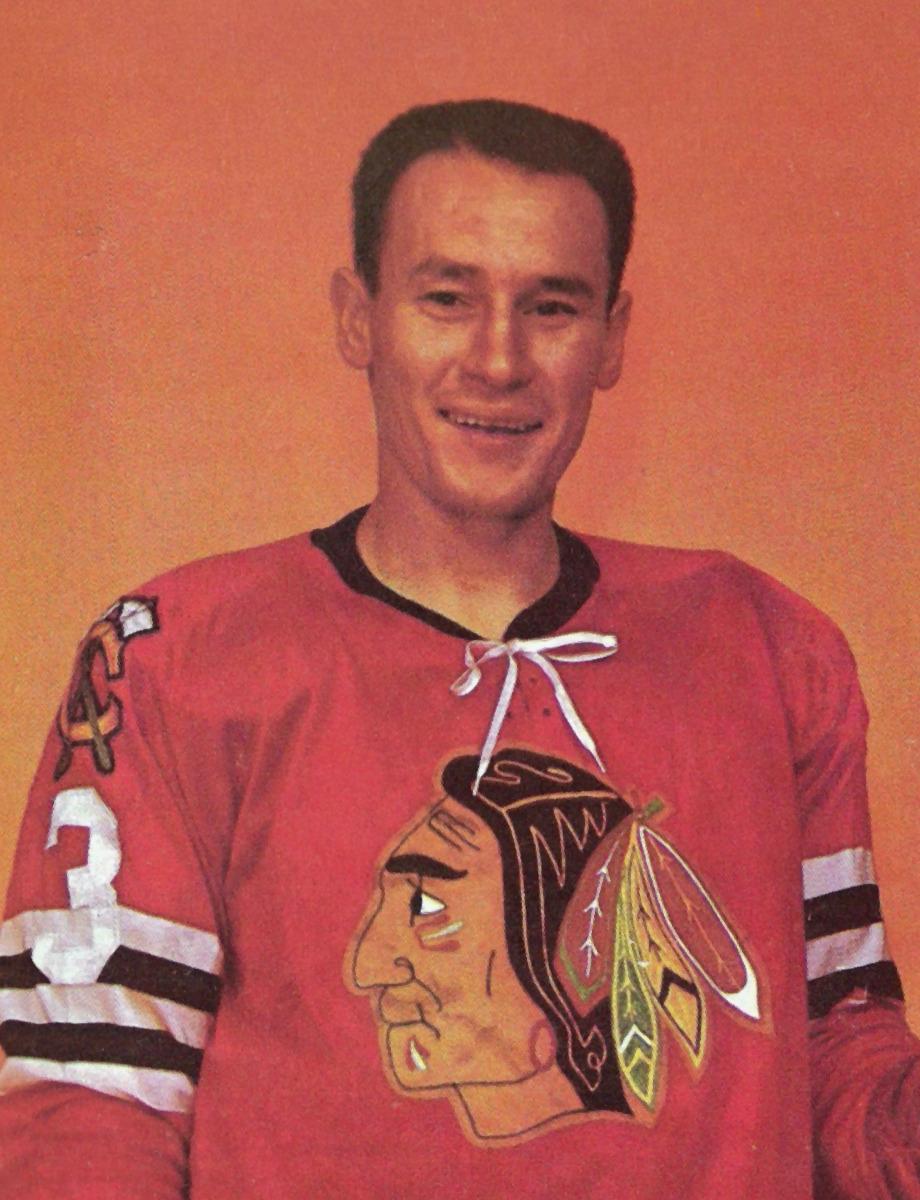
Pierre Pilote was selected for the NHL All-Star Team 8 times.

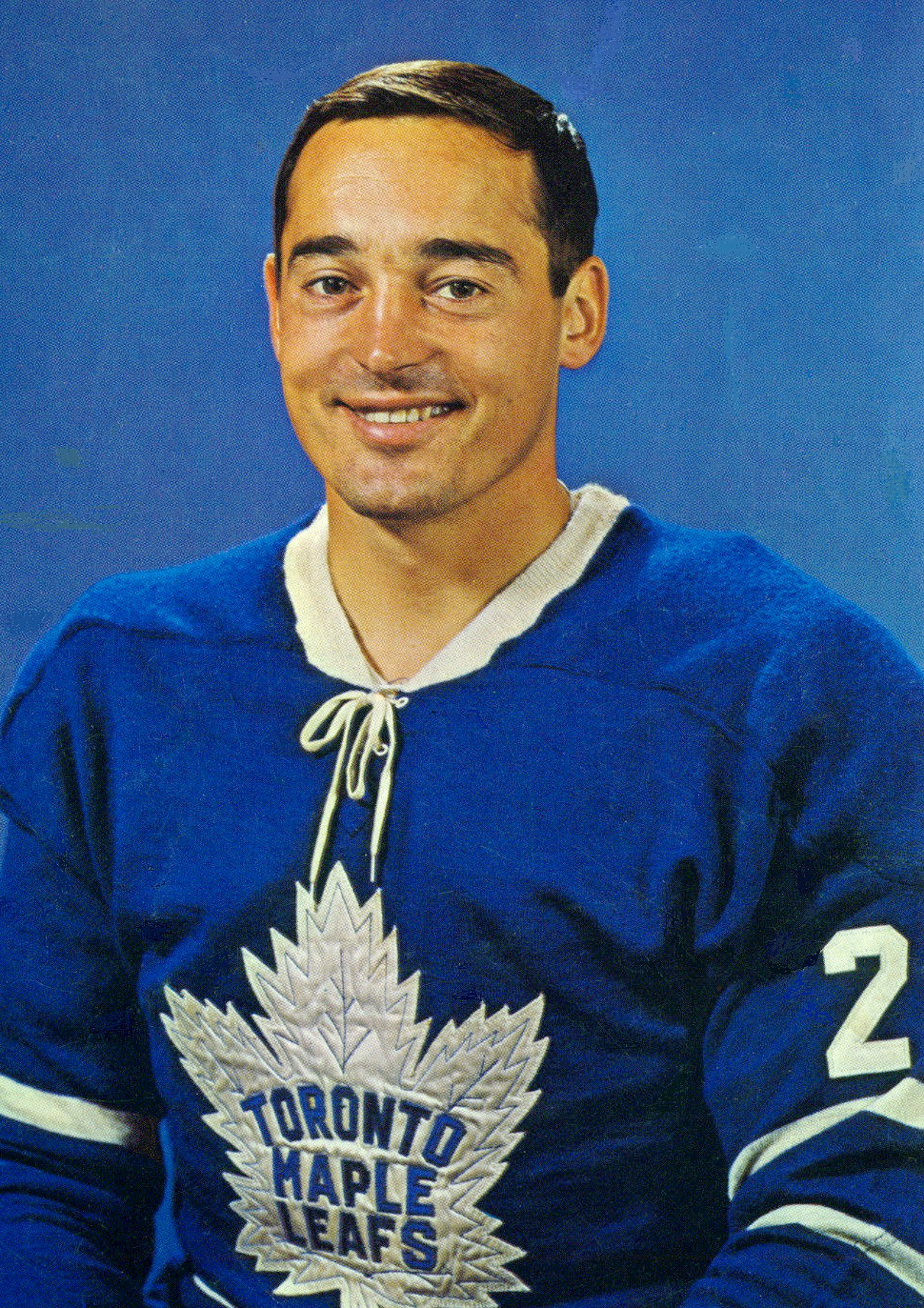
Frank Mahovlich was selected for the NHL All-Star Team 9 times.

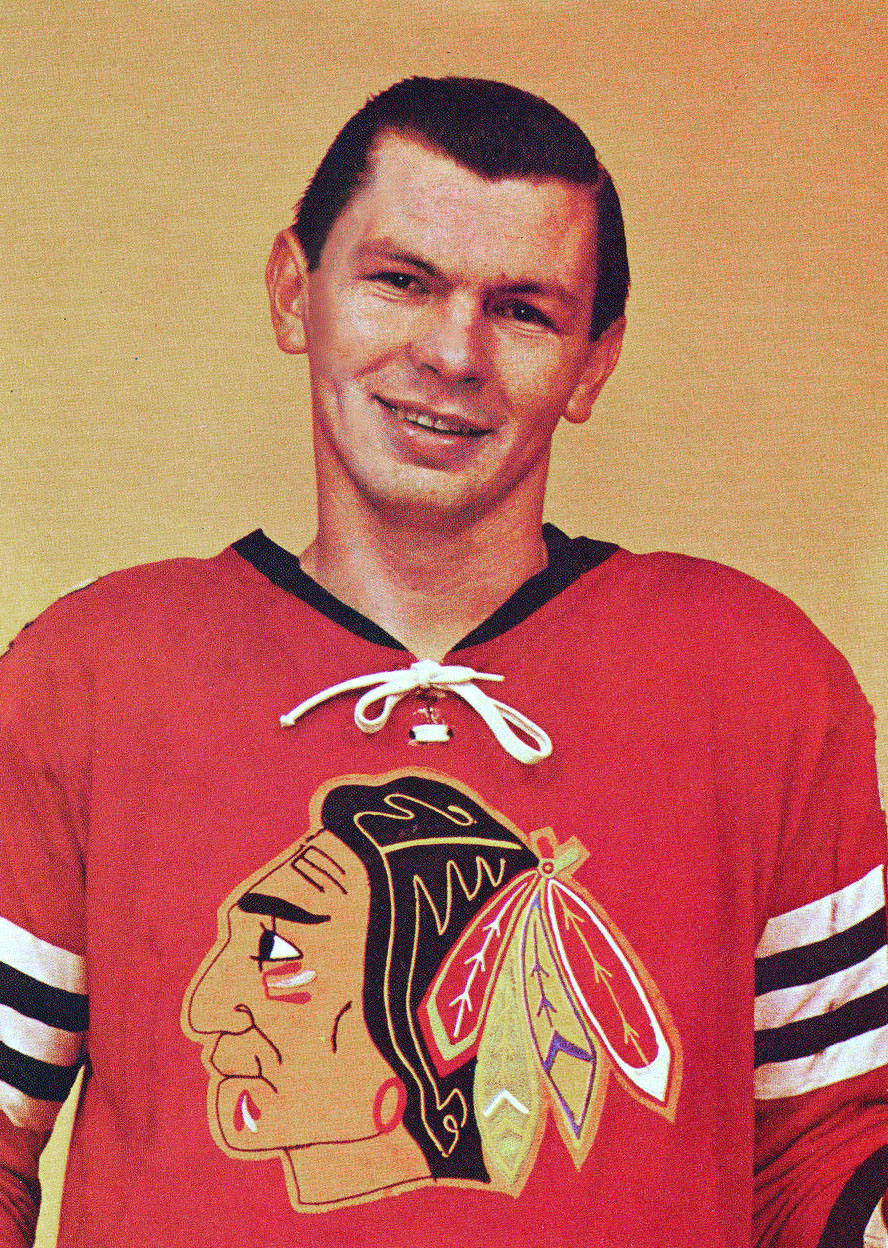
Stan Mikita was selected for the NHL All-Star Team 8 times.

Season	Pos	First Team		Second Team	
Season	Pos	Player	Team(s)	Player	Team(s)
1942–43	C	**Bill Cowley*** (3)	Boston Bruins	Syl Apps* (5)	Toronto Maple Leafs
1942–43	LW	Doug Bentley*	Chicago Black Hawks	Lynn Patrick* (2)	New York Rangers
1942–43	RW	Lorne Carr	Toronto Maple Leafs	Bryan Hextall* (4)	New York Rangers
1942–43	D	Earl Seibert* (9)	Chicago Black Hawks	Jack Crawford	Boston Bruins
1942–43	D	Jack Stewart*	Detroit Red Wings	Flash Hollett	Boston Bruins
1942–43	G	Johnny Mowers	Detroit Red Wings	Frank Brimsek* (5)	Boston Bruins
1942–43	Coach	Jack Adams* (2)	Detroit Red Wings	Art Ross* (3)	Boston Bruins
1943–44	C	Bill Cowley* (4)	Boston Bruins	Elmer Lach*	Montreal Canadiens
1943–44	LW	Doug Bentley* (2)	Chicago Black Hawks	Herb Cain	Boston Bruins
1943–44	RW	Lorne Carr (2)	Toronto Maple Leafs	Maurice Richard*	Montreal Canadiens
1943–44	D	**Babe Pratt***	Toronto Maple Leafs	Emile Bouchard*	Montreal Canadiens
1943–44	D	Earl Seibert* (10)	Chicago Black Hawks	Dit Clapper* (6)	Boston Bruins
1943–44	G	Bill Durnan*	Montreal Canadiens	Paul Bibeault	Toronto Maple Leafs
1943–44	Coach	Dick Irvin* (7)	Montreal Canadiens	Hap Day* (Note: Hap Day was inducted into the Hockey Hall of Fame in the player category in 1961.)	Toronto Maple Leafs
1944–45	C	**Elmer Lach*** (2)	Montreal Canadiens	Bill Cowley* (5)	Boston Bruins
1944–45	LW	Toe Blake* (4)	Montreal Canadiens	Syd Howe*	Detroit Red Wings
1944–45	RW	Maurice Richard* (2)	Montreal Canadiens	Bill Mosienko*	Chicago Black Hawks
1944–45	D	Emile Bouchard* (2)	Montreal Canadiens	Glen Harmon	Montreal Canadiens
1944–45	D	Flash Hollett (2)	Detroit Red Wings	Babe Pratt* (2)	Toronto Maple Leafs
1944–45	G	Bill Durnan* (2)	Montreal Canadiens	Mike Karakas	Chicago Black Hawks
1944–45	Coach	Dick Irvin* (8)	Montreal Canadiens	Jack Adams* (3)	Detroit Red Wings
1945–46	C	**Max Bentley***	Chicago Black Hawks	Elmer Lach* (3)	Montreal Canadiens
1945–46	LW	Gaye Stewart	Toronto Maple Leafs	Toe Blake* (5)	Montreal Canadiens
1945–46	RW	Maurice Richard* (3)	Montreal Canadiens	Bill Mosienko* (2)	Chicago Black Hawks
1945–46	D	Emile Bouchard* (3)	Montreal Canadiens	Ken Reardon*	Montreal Canadiens
1945–46	D	Jack Crawford (2)	Boston Bruins	Jack Stewart* (2)	Detroit Red Wings
1945–46	G	Bill Durnan* (3)	Montreal Canadiens	Frank Brimsek* (6)	Boston Bruins
1945–46	Coach	Dick Irvin* (9)	Montreal Canadiens	Johnny Gottselig (2)	Chicago Black Hawks
1946–47	C	Milt Schmidt* (2)	Boston Bruins	Max Bentley* (2)	Chicago Black Hawks
1946–47	LW	Doug Bentley* (3)	Chicago Black Hawks	Woody Dumart* (3)	Boston Bruins
1946–47	RW	**Maurice Richard*** (4)	Montreal Canadiens	Bobby Bauer* (4)	Boston Bruins
1946–47	D	Emile Bouchard* (4)	Montreal Canadiens	Bill Quackenbush*	Detroit Red Wings
1946–47	D	Ken Reardon* (2)	Montreal Canadiens	Jack Stewart* (3)	Detroit Red Wings
1946–47	G	Bill Durnan* (4)	Montreal Canadiens	Frank Brimsek* (7)	Boston Bruins
1947–48	C	Elmer Lach* (4)	Montreal Canadiens	**Buddy O'Connor***	New York Rangers
1947–48	LW	Ted Lindsay*	Detroit Red Wings	Gaye Stewart (2)	Toronto Maple Leafs; Chicago Black Hawks
1947–48	RW	Maurice Richard* (5)	Montreal Canadiens	Bud Poile* (Note: Bud Poile was inducted into the Hockey Hall of Fame in the builder category in 1990.)	Toronto Maple Leafs; Chicago Black Hawks
1947–48	D	Bill Quackenbush* (2)	Detroit Red Wings	Neil Colville* (3)	New York Rangers
1947–48	D	Jack Stewart* (4)	Detroit Red Wings	Ken Reardon* (3)	Montreal Canadiens
1947–48	G	Turk Broda* (3)	Toronto Maple Leafs	Frank Brimsek* (8)	Boston Bruins
1948–49	C	**Sid Abel*** (2)	Detroit Red Wings	Doug Bentley* (4)	Chicago Black Hawks
1948–49	LW	Roy Conacher*	Chicago Black Hawks	Ted Lindsay* (2)	Detroit Red Wings
1948–49	RW	Maurice Richard* (6)	Montreal Canadiens	Gordie Howe*	Detroit Red Wings
1948–49	D	Bill Quackenbush* (3)	Detroit Red Wings	Glen Harmon (2)	Montreal Canadiens
1948–49	D	Jack Stewart* (5)	Detroit Red Wings	Ken Reardon* (4)	Montreal Canadiens
1948–49	G	Bill Durnan* (5)	Montreal Canadiens	Chuck Rayner*	New York Rangers
1949–50	C	Sid Abel* (3)	Detroit Red Wings	Ted Kennedy*	Toronto Maple Leafs
1949–50	LW	Ted Lindsay* (3)	Detroit Red Wings	Tony Leswick	New York Rangers
1949–50	RW	Maurice Richard* (7)	Montreal Canadiens	Gordie Howe* (2)	Detroit Red Wings
1949–50	D	Gus Mortson	Toronto Maple Leafs	Red Kelly*	Detroit Red Wings
1949–50	D	Ken Reardon* (5)	Montreal Canadiens	Leo Reise Jr.	Detroit Red Wings
1949–50	G	Bill Durnan* (6)	Montreal Canadiens	**Chuck Rayner*** (2)	New York Rangers
1950–51	C	**Milt Schmidt*** (3)	Boston Bruins	Sid Abel* (4)	Detroit Red Wings
1950–51	C	**Milt Schmidt*** (3)	Boston Bruins	Ted Kennedy* (2)	Toronto Maple Leafs
1950–51	LW	Ted Lindsay* (4)	Detroit Red Wings	Sid Smith	Toronto Maple Leafs
1950–51	RW	Gordie Howe* (3)	Detroit Red Wings	Maurice Richard* (8)	Montreal Canadiens
1950–51	D	Red Kelly* (2)	Detroit Red Wings	Leo Reise Jr. (2)	Detroit Red Wings
1950–51	D	Bill Quackenbush* (4)	Boston Bruins	Jimmy Thomson	Toronto Maple Leafs
1950–51	G	Terry Sawchuk*	Detroit Red Wings	Chuck Rayner* (3)	New York Rangers
1951–52	C	Elmer Lach* (5)	Montreal Canadiens	Milt Schmidt* (4)	Boston Bruins
1951–52	LW	Ted Lindsay* (5)	Detroit Red Wings	Sid Smith (2)	Toronto Maple Leafs
1951–52	RW	**Gordie Howe*** (4)	Detroit Red Wings	Maurice Richard* (9)	Montreal Canadiens
1951–52	D	Doug Harvey*	Montreal Canadiens	Hy Buller	New York Rangers
1951–52	D	Red Kelly* (3)	Detroit Red Wings	Jimmy Thomson (2)	Toronto Maple Leafs
1951–52	G	Terry Sawchuk* (2)	Detroit Red Wings	Jim Henry	Boston Bruins
1952–53	C	Fleming Mackell	Boston Bruins	Alex Delvecchio*	Detroit Red Wings
1952–53	LW	Ted Lindsay* (6)	Detroit Red Wings	Bert Olmstead*	Montreal Canadiens
1952–53	RW	**Gordie Howe*** (5)	Detroit Red Wings	Maurice Richard* (10)	Montreal Canadiens
1952–53	D	Doug Harvey* (2)	Montreal Canadiens	Bill Gadsby*	Chicago Black Hawks
1952–53	D	Red Kelly* (4)	Detroit Red Wings	Bill Quackenbush* (5)	Boston Bruins
1952–53	G	Terry Sawchuk* (3)	Detroit Red Wings	Gerry McNeil	Montreal Canadiens
1953–54	C	Ken Mosdell	Montreal Canadiens	Ted Kennedy* (3)	Toronto Maple Leafs
1953–54	LW	Ted Lindsay* (7)	Detroit Red Wings	Ed Sandford	Boston Bruins
1953–54	RW	Gordie Howe* (6)	Detroit Red Wings	Maurice Richard* (11)	Montreal Canadiens
1953–54	D	Doug Harvey* (3)	Montreal Canadiens	Bill Gadsby* (2)	Chicago Black Hawks
1953–54	D	Red Kelly* (5)	Detroit Red Wings	Tim Horton*	Toronto Maple Leafs
1953–54	G	Harry Lumley*	Toronto Maple Leafs	Terry Sawchuk* (4)	Detroit Red Wings
1954–55	C	Jean Beliveau*	Montreal Canadiens	Ken Mosdell (2)	Montreal Canadiens
1954–55	LW	Sid Smith (3)	Toronto Maple Leafs	Danny Lewicki	New York Rangers
1954–55	RW	Maurice Richard* (12)	Montreal Canadiens	Bernie Geoffrion*	Montreal Canadiens
1954–55	D	Doug Harvey* (4)	Montreal Canadiens	Fernie Flaman*	Boston Bruins
1954–55	D	Red Kelly* (6)	Detroit Red Wings	Bob Goldham	Detroit Red Wings
1954–55	G	Harry Lumley* (2)	Toronto Maple Leafs	Terry Sawchuk* (5)	Detroit Red Wings
1955–56	C	**Jean Beliveau*** (2)	Montreal Canadiens	Tod Sloan	Toronto Maple Leafs
1955–56	LW	Ted Lindsay* (8)	Detroit Red Wings	Bert Olmstead* (2)	Montreal Canadiens
1955–56	RW	Maurice Richard* (13)	Montreal Canadiens	Gordie Howe* (7)	Detroit Red Wings
1955–56	D	Bill Gadsby* (3)	New York Rangers	Tom Johnson*	Montreal Canadiens
1955–56	D	Doug Harvey* (5)	Montreal Canadiens	Red Kelly* (7)	Detroit Red Wings
1955–56	G	Jacques Plante*	Montreal Canadiens	Glenn Hall*	Detroit Red Wings
1956–57	C	Jean Beliveau* (3)	Montreal Canadiens	Ed Litzenberger	Chicago Black Hawks
1956–57	LW	Ted Lindsay* (9)	Detroit Red Wings	Real Chevrefils	Boston Bruins
1956–57	RW	**Gordie Howe*** (8)	Detroit Red Wings	Maurice Richard* (14)	Montreal Canadiens
1956–57	D	Doug Harvey* (6)	Montreal Canadiens	Fernie Flaman* (2)	Boston Bruins
1956–57	D	Red Kelly* (8)	Detroit Red Wings	Bill Gadsby* (4)	New York Rangers
1956–57	G	Glenn Hall* (2)	Detroit Red Wings	Jacques Plante* (2)	Montreal Canadiens
1957–58	C	Henri Richard*	Montreal Canadiens	Jean Beliveau* (4)	Montreal Canadiens
1957–58	LW	Dickie Moore*	Montreal Canadiens	Camille Henry	New York Rangers
1957–58	RW	**Gordie Howe*** (9)	Detroit Red Wings	Andy Bathgate*	New York Rangers
1957–58	D	Doug Harvey* (7)	Montreal Canadiens	Fernie Flaman* (3)	Boston Bruins
1957–58	D	Bill Gadsby* (5)	New York Rangers	Marcel Pronovost*	Detroit Red Wings
1957–58	G	Glenn Hall* (3)	Chicago Black Hawks	Jacques Plante* (3)	Montreal Canadiens
1958–59	C	Jean Beliveau* (5)	Montreal Canadiens	Henri Richard* (2)	Montreal Canadiens
1958–59	LW	Dickie Moore* (2)	Montreal Canadiens	Alex Delvecchio* (2)	Detroit Red Wings
1958–59	RW	**Andy Bathgate*** (2)	New York Rangers	Gordie Howe* (10)	Detroit Red Wings
1958–59	D	Bill Gadsby* (6)	New York Rangers	Doug Harvey* (8)	Montreal Canadiens
1958–59	D	Tom Johnson* (2)	Montreal Canadiens	Marcel Pronovost* (2)	Detroit Red Wings
1958–59	G	Jacques Plante* (4)	Montreal Canadiens	Terry Sawchuk* (6)	Detroit Red Wings
1959–60	C	Jean Beliveau* (6)	Montreal Canadiens	Bronco Horvath	Boston Bruins
1959–60	LW	Bobby Hull*	Chicago Black Hawks	Dean Prentice	New York Rangers
1959–60	RW	**Gordie Howe*** (11)	Detroit Red Wings	Bernie Geoffrion* (2)	Montreal Canadiens
1959–60	D	Doug Harvey* (9)	Montreal Canadiens	Pierre Pilote*	Chicago Black Hawks
1959–60	D	Marcel Pronovost* (3)	Detroit Red Wings	Allan Stanley*	Toronto Maple Leafs
1959–60	G	Glenn Hall* (4)	Chicago Black Hawks	Jacques Plante* (5)	Montreal Canadiens
1960–61	C	Jean Beliveau* (7)	Montreal Canadiens	Henri Richard* (3)	Montreal Canadiens
1960–61	LW	Frank Mahovlich*	Toronto Maple Leafs	Dickie Moore* (3)	Montreal Canadiens
1960–61	RW	**Bernie Geoffrion*** (3)	Montreal Canadiens	Gordie Howe* (12)	Detroit Red Wings
1960–61	D	Doug Harvey* (10)	Montreal Canadiens	Pierre Pilote* (2)	Chicago Black Hawks
1960–61	D	Marcel Pronovost* (4)	Detroit Red Wings	Allan Stanley* (2)	Toronto Maple Leafs
1960–61	G	Johnny Bower*	Toronto Maple Leafs	Glenn Hall* (5)	Chicago Black Hawks
1961–62	C	Stan Mikita*	Chicago Black Hawks	Dave Keon*	Toronto Maple Leafs
1961–62	LW	Bobby Hull* (2)	Chicago Black Hawks	Frank Mahovlich* (2)	Toronto Maple Leafs
1961–62	RW	Andy Bathgate* (3)	New York Rangers	Gordie Howe* (13)	Detroit Red Wings
1961–62	D	Doug Harvey* (11)	New York Rangers	Carl Brewer	Toronto Maple Leafs
1961–62	D	Jean-Guy Talbot	Montreal Canadiens	Pierre Pilote* (3)	Chicago Black Hawks
1961–62	G	**Jacques Plante*** (6)	Montreal Canadiens	Glenn Hall* (6)	Chicago Black Hawks
1962–63	C	Stan Mikita* (2)	Chicago Black Hawks	Henri Richard* (4)	Montreal Canadiens
1962–63	LW	Frank Mahovlich* (3)	Toronto Maple Leafs	Bobby Hull* (3)	Chicago Black Hawks
1962–63	RW	**Gordie Howe*** (14)	Detroit Red Wings	Andy Bathgate* (4)	New York Rangers
1962–63	D	Carl Brewer (2)	Toronto Maple Leafs	Tim Horton* (2)	Toronto Maple Leafs
1962–63	D	Pierre Pilote* (4)	Chicago Black Hawks	Elmer Vasko	Chicago Black Hawks
1962–63	G	Glenn Hall* (7)	Chicago Black Hawks	Terry Sawchuk* (7)	Detroit Red Wings
1963–64	C	Stan Mikita* (3)	Chicago Black Hawks	**Jean Beliveau*** (8)	Montreal Canadiens
1963–64	LW	Bobby Hull* (4)	Chicago Black Hawks	Frank Mahovlich* (4)	Toronto Maple Leafs
1963–64	RW	Kenny Wharram	Chicago Black Hawks	Gordie Howe* (15)	Detroit Red Wings
1963–64	D	Tim Horton* (3)	Toronto Maple Leafs	Jacques Laperriere*	Montreal Canadiens
1963–64	D	Pierre Pilote* (5)	Chicago Black Hawks	Elmer Vasko (2)	Chicago Black Hawks
1963–64	G	Glenn Hall* (8)	Chicago Black Hawks	Charlie Hodge	Montreal Canadiens
1964–65	C	Norm Ullman*	Detroit Red Wings	Stan Mikita* (4)	Chicago Black Hawks
1964–65	LW	**Bobby Hull*** (5)	Chicago Black Hawks	Frank Mahovlich* (5)	Toronto Maple Leafs
1964–65	RW	Claude Provost	Montreal Canadiens	Gordie Howe* (16)	Detroit Red Wings
1964–65	D	Jacques Laperriere* (2)	Montreal Canadiens	Carl Brewer (3)	Toronto Maple Leafs
1964–65	D	Pierre Pilote* (6)	Chicago Black Hawks	Bill Gadsby* (7)	Detroit Red Wings
1964–65	G	Roger Crozier	Detroit Red Wings	Charlie Hodge (2)	Montreal Canadiens
1965–66	C	Stan Mikita* (5)	Chicago Black Hawks	Jean Beliveau* (9)	Montreal Canadiens
1965–66	LW	**Bobby Hull*** (6)	Chicago Black Hawks	Frank Mahovlich* (6)	Toronto Maple Leafs
1965–66	RW	Gordie Howe* (17)	Detroit Red Wings	Bobby Rousseau	Montreal Canadiens
1965–66	D	Jacques Laperriere* (3)	Montreal Canadiens	Allan Stanley* (3)	Toronto Maple Leafs
1965–66	D	Pierre Pilote* (7)	Chicago Black Hawks	Pat Stapleton	Chicago Black Hawks
1965–66	G	Glenn Hall* (9)	Chicago Black Hawks	Gump Worsley*	Montreal Canadiens
1966–67	C	**Stan Mikita*** (6)	Chicago Black Hawks	Norm Ullman* (2)	Detroit Red Wings
1966–67	LW	Bobby Hull* (7)	Chicago Black Hawks	Don Marshall	New York Rangers
1966–67	RW	Kenny Wharram (2)	Chicago Black Hawks	Gordie Howe* (18)	Detroit Red Wings
1966–67	D	Harry Howell*	New York Rangers	Tim Horton* (4)	Toronto Maple Leafs
1966–67	D	Pierre Pilote* (8)	Chicago Black Hawks	Bobby Orr*	Boston Bruins
1966–67	G	Eddie Giacomin*	New York Rangers	Glenn Hall* (10)	Chicago Black Hawks

=== Expansion era (1967–68 to 2004–05) ===
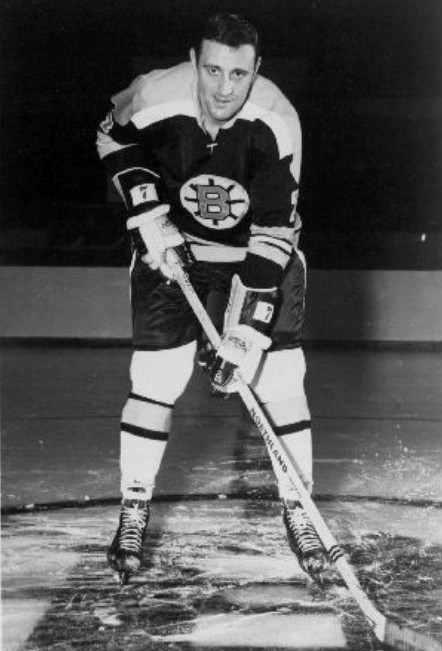
Phil Esposito was selected for the NHL All-Star Team 8 times.

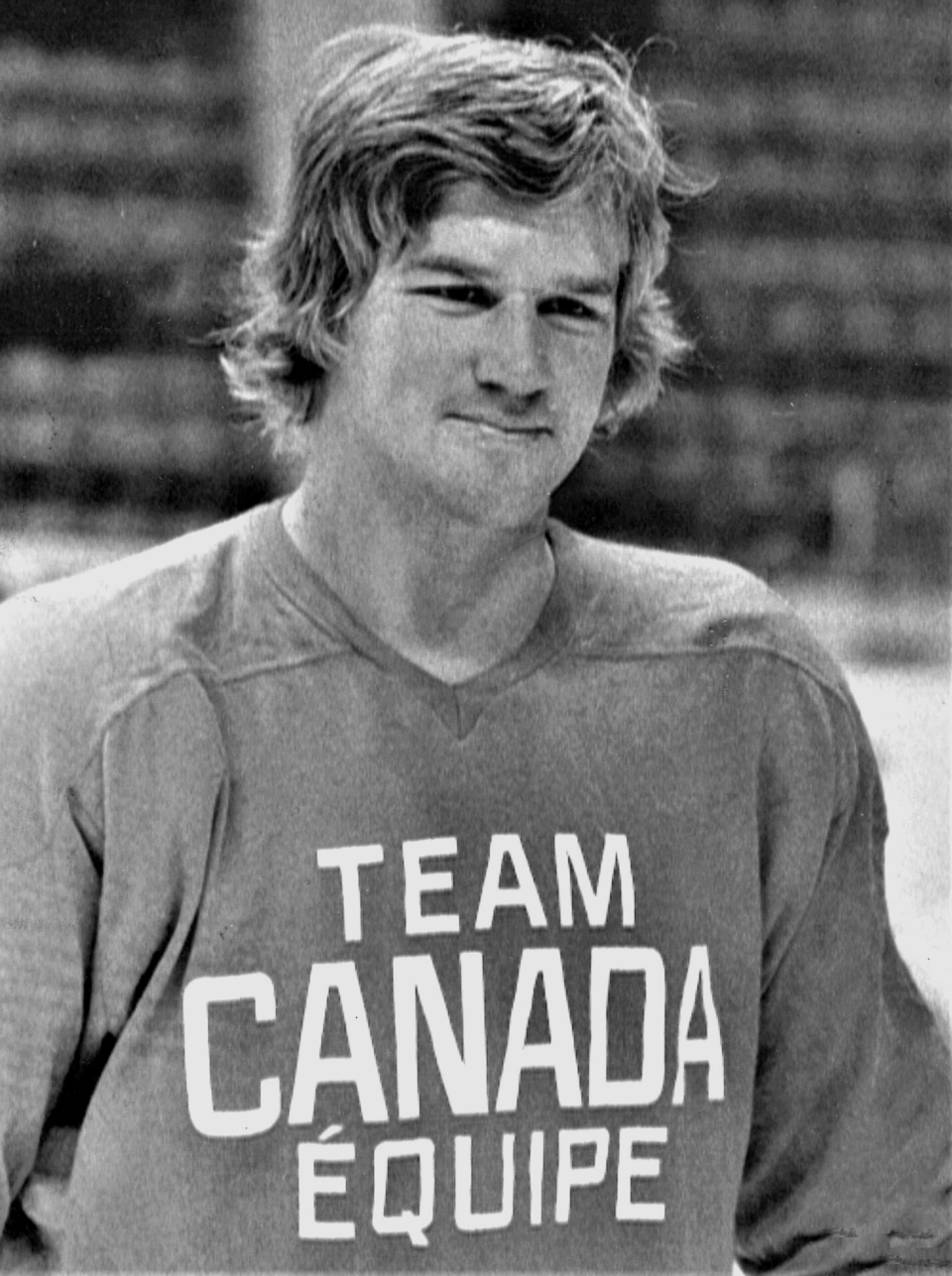
Bobby Orr was selected for the NHL All-Star Team 9 times.

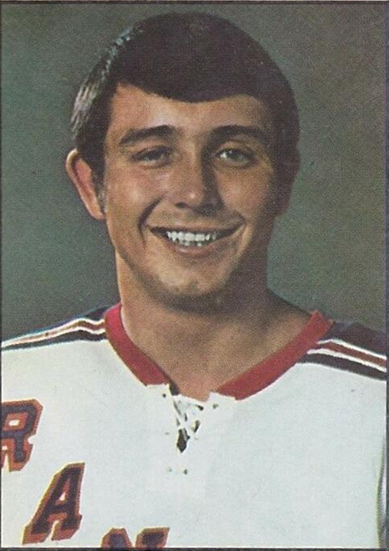
Brad Park was selected for the NHL All-Star Team 7 times.

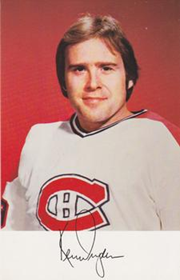
Ken Dryden was selected for the NHL All-Star Team 6 times.

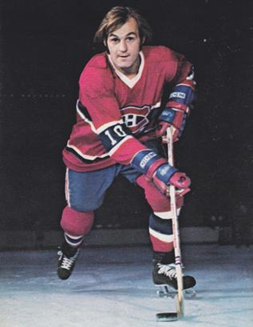
Guy Lafleur was selected for the NHL All-Star Team 6 times.

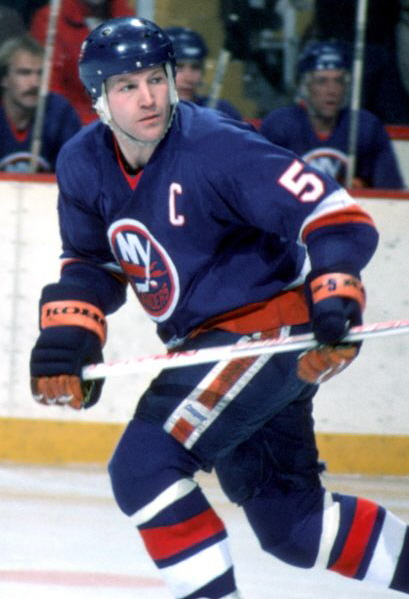
Denis Potvin was selected for the NHL All-Star Team 7 times.

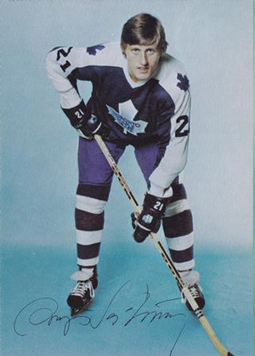
Borje Salming was selected for the NHL All-Star Team 6 times.

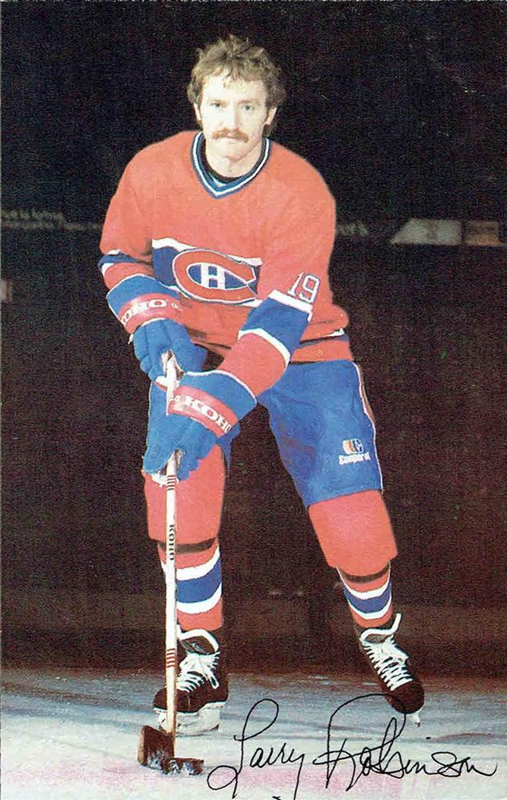
Larry Robinson was selected for the NHL All-Star Team 6 times.

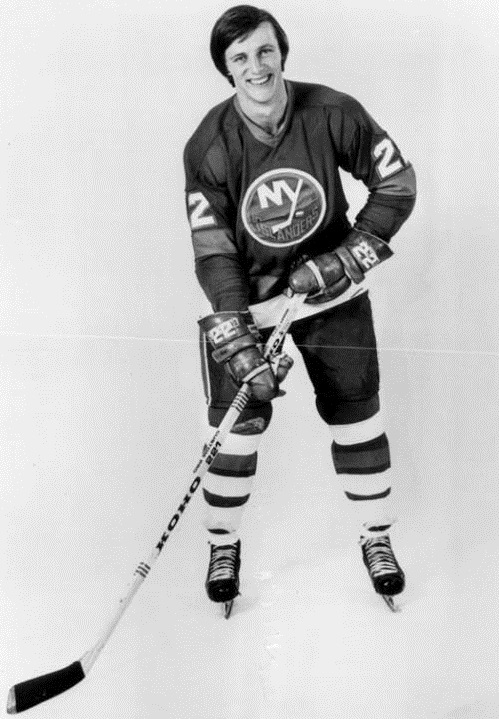
Mike Bossy was selected for the NHL All-Star Team 8 times.

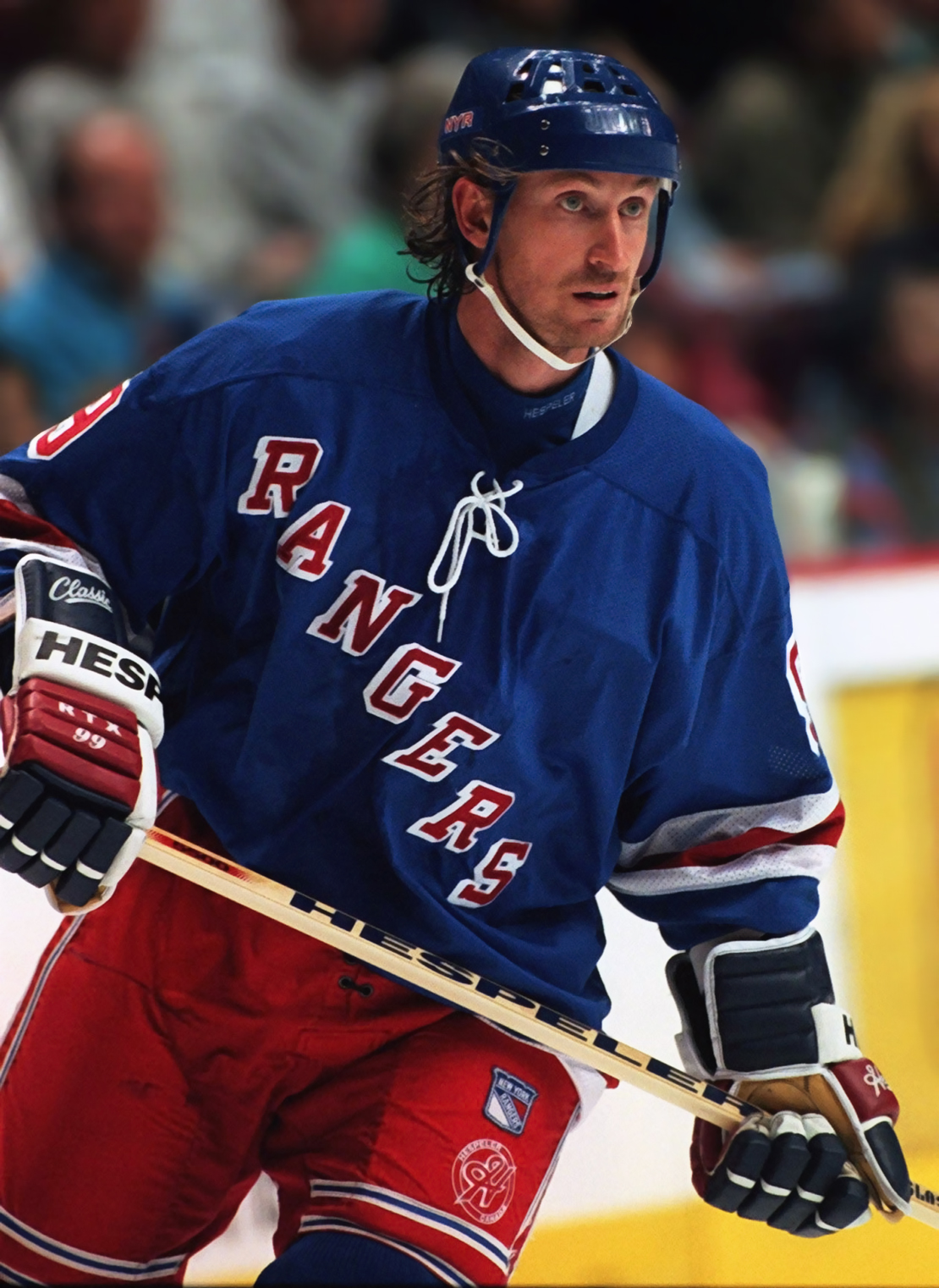
Wayne Gretzky was selected for the NHL All-Star Team 15 times.

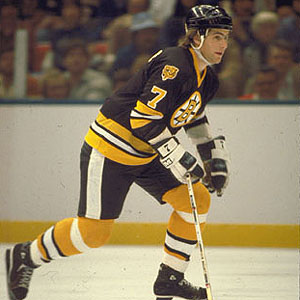
Ray Bourque was selected for the NHL All-Star Team 19 times.

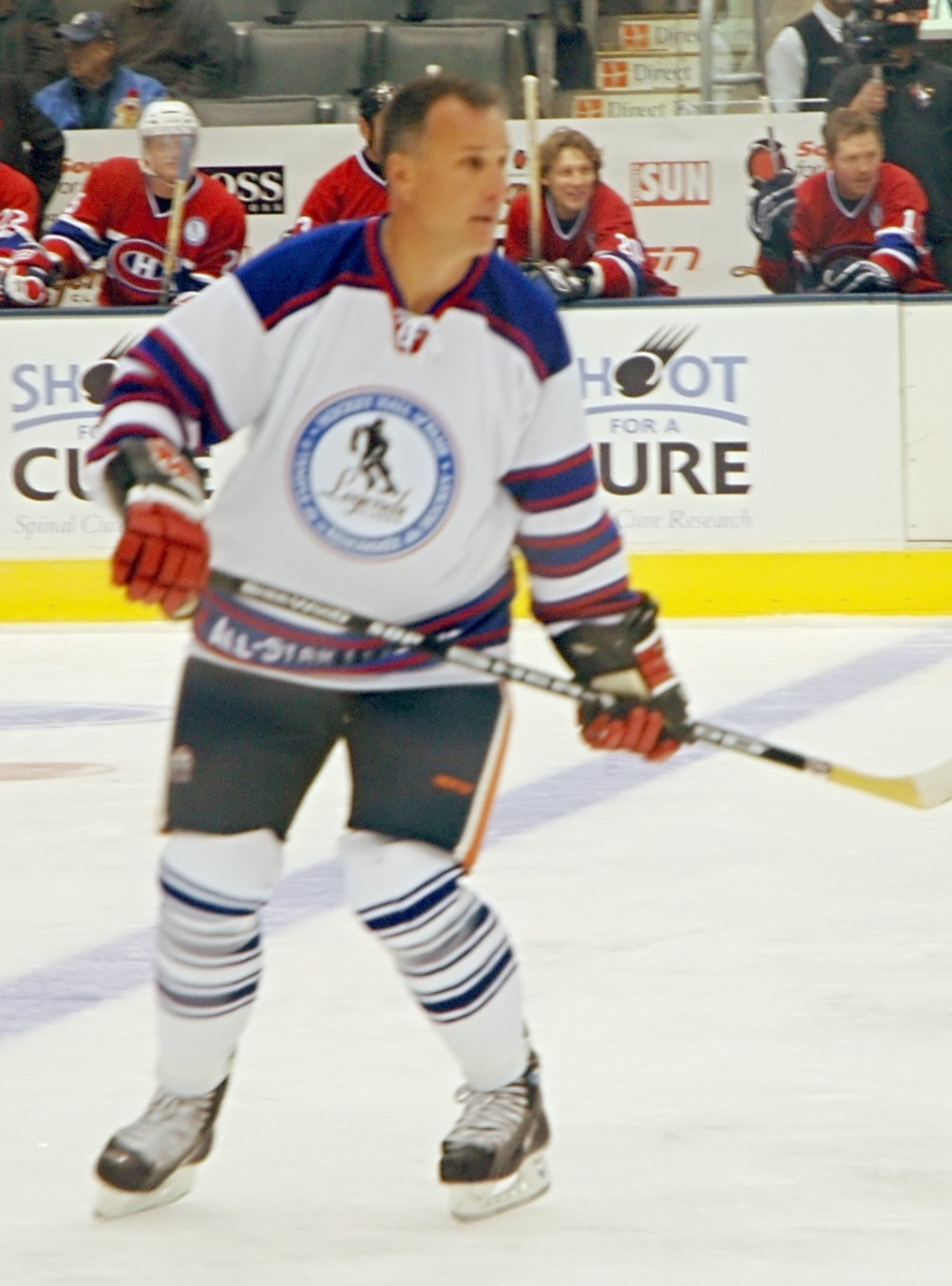
Paul Coffey was selected for the NHL All-Star Team 8 times.

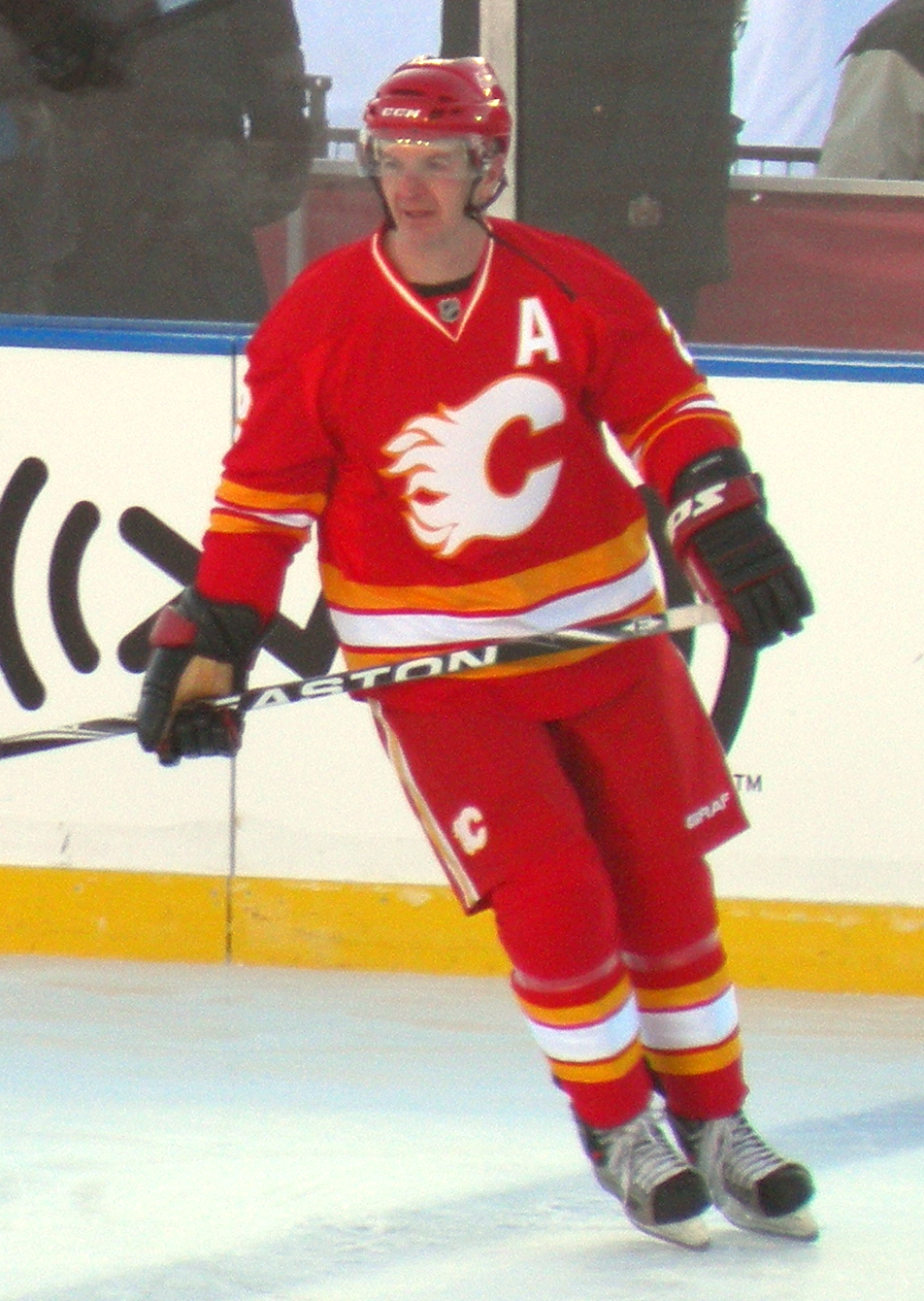
Al MacInnis was selected for the NHL All-Star Team 7 times.

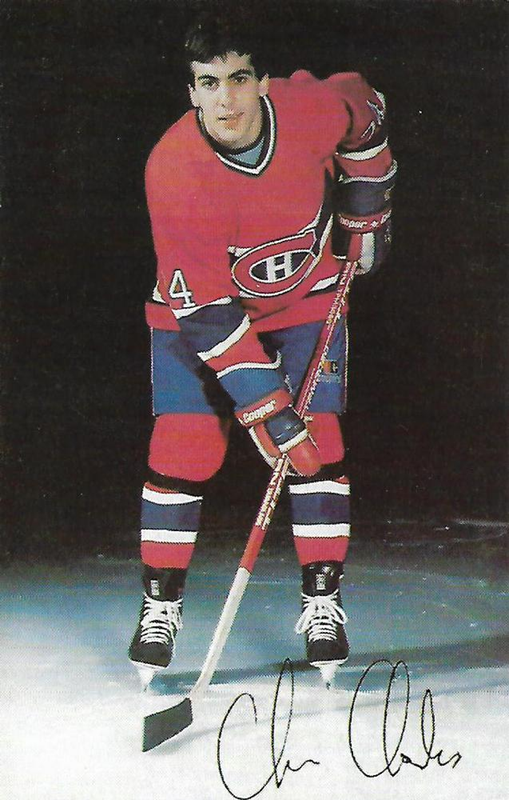
Chris Chelios was selected for the NHL All-Star Team 7 times.

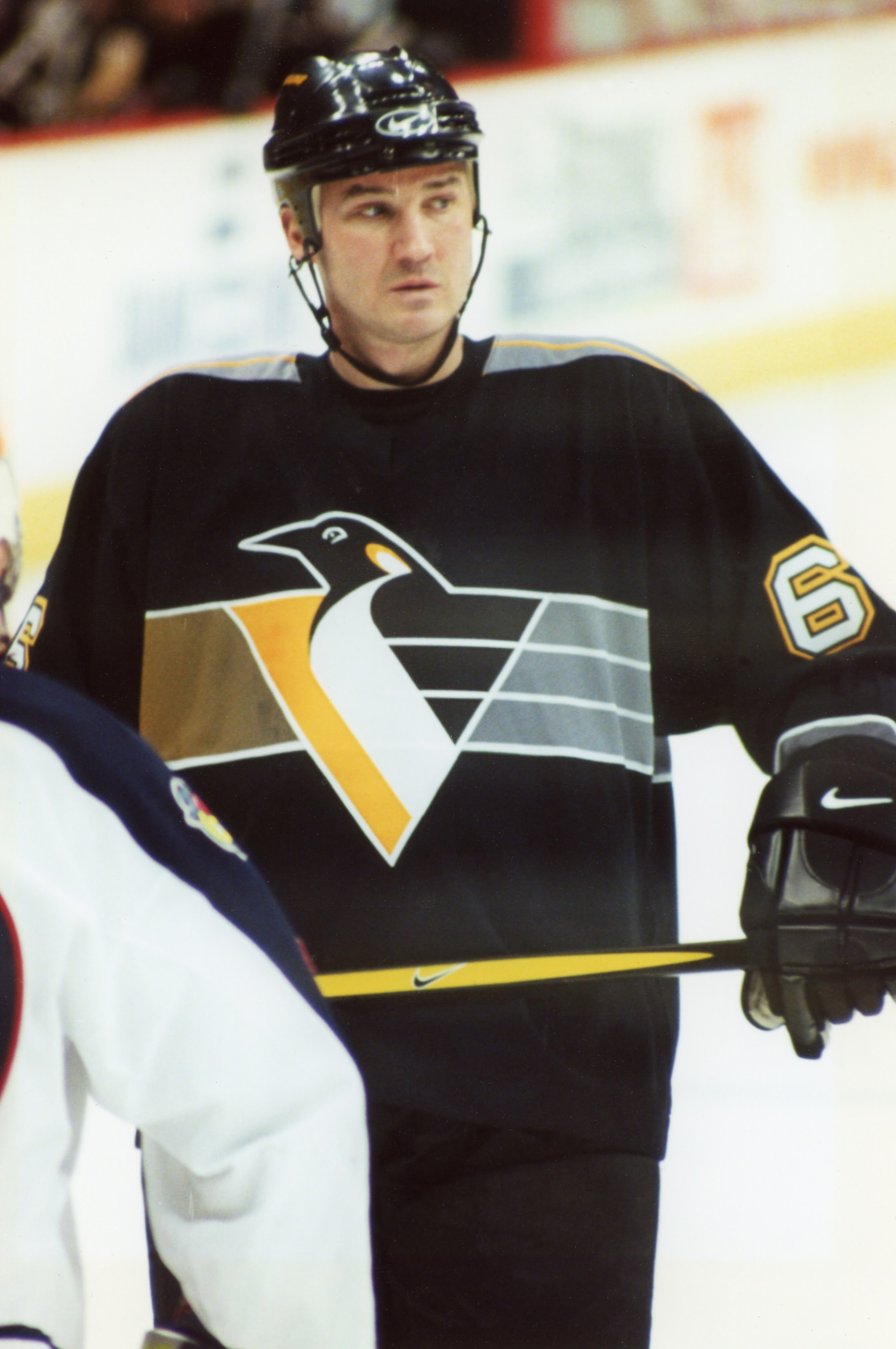
Mario Lemieux was selected for the NHL All-Star Team 9 times.

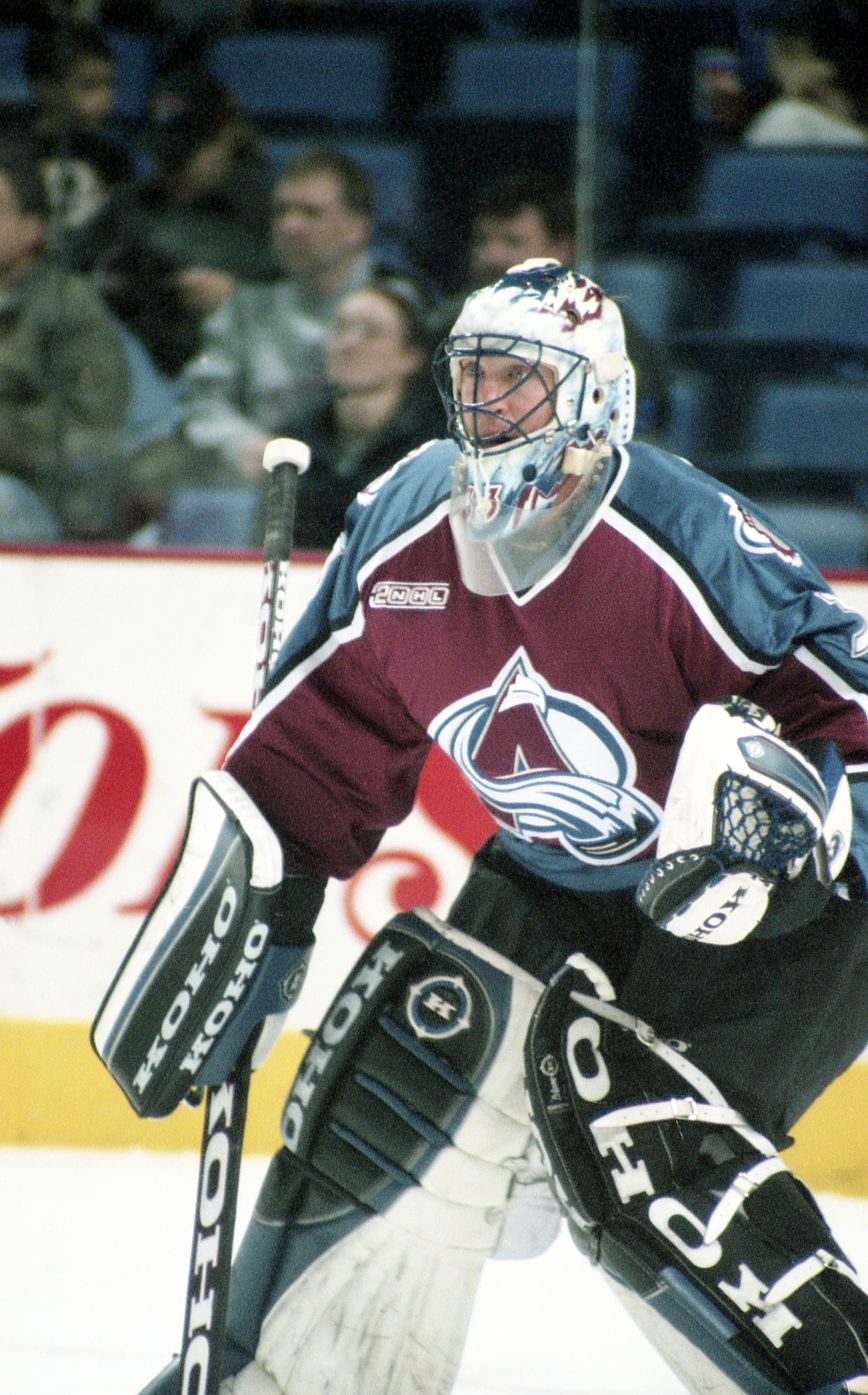
Patrick Roy was selected for the NHL All-Star Team 6 times.

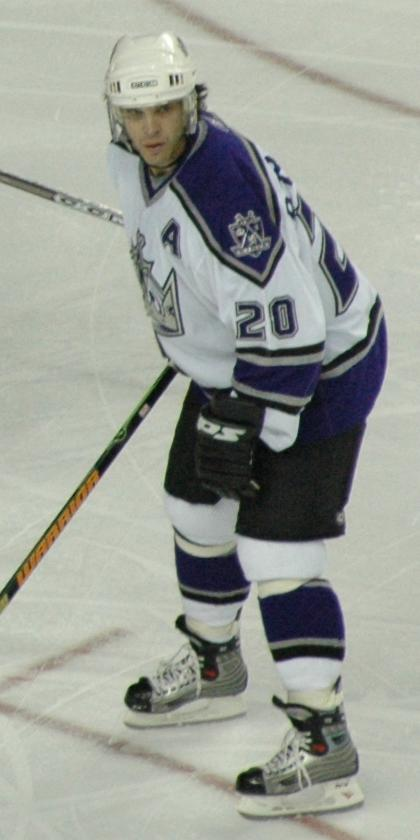
Luc Robitaille was selected for the NHL All-Star Team 8 times.

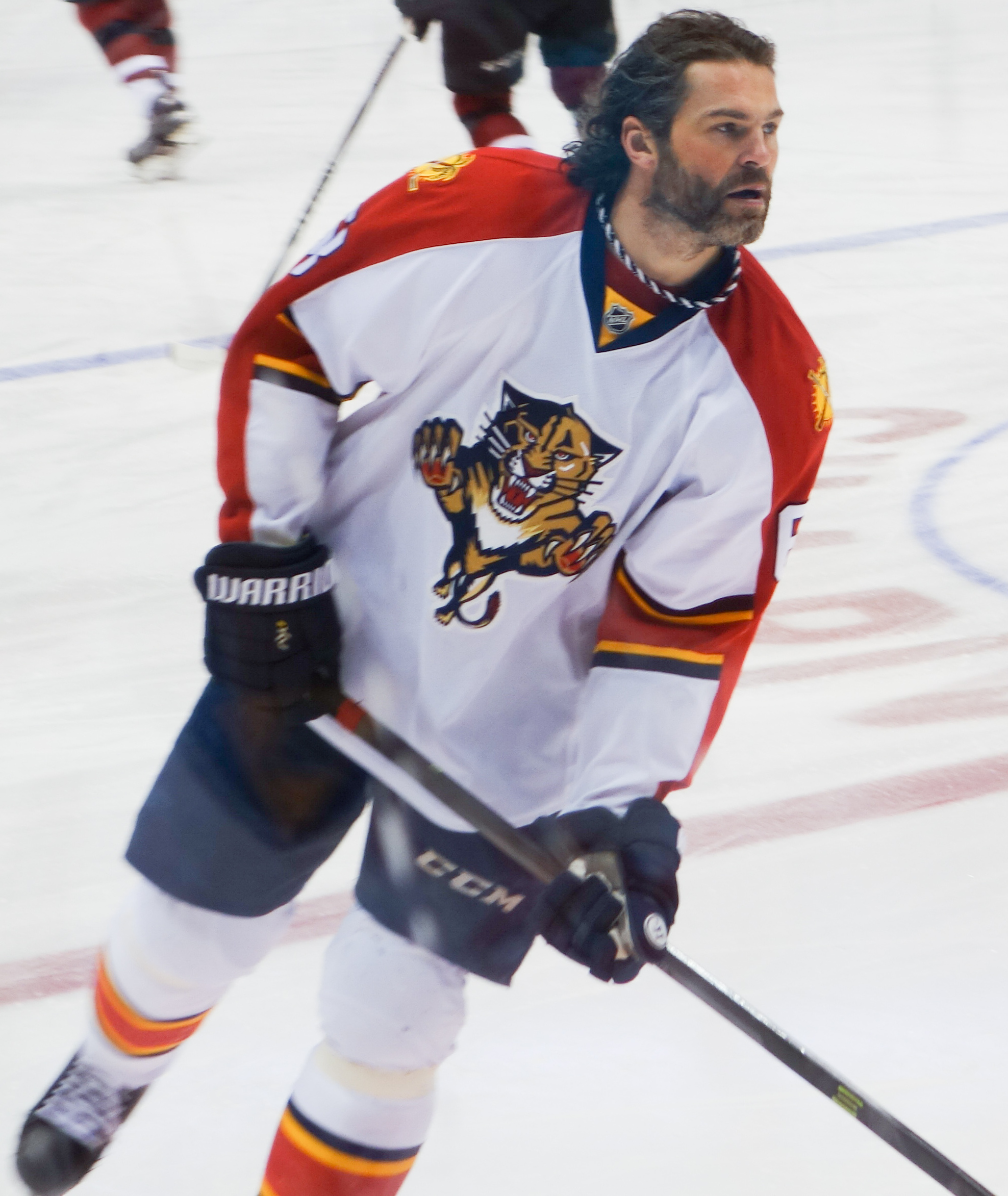
Jaromir Jagr has been selected to the NHL All-Star team 8 times.

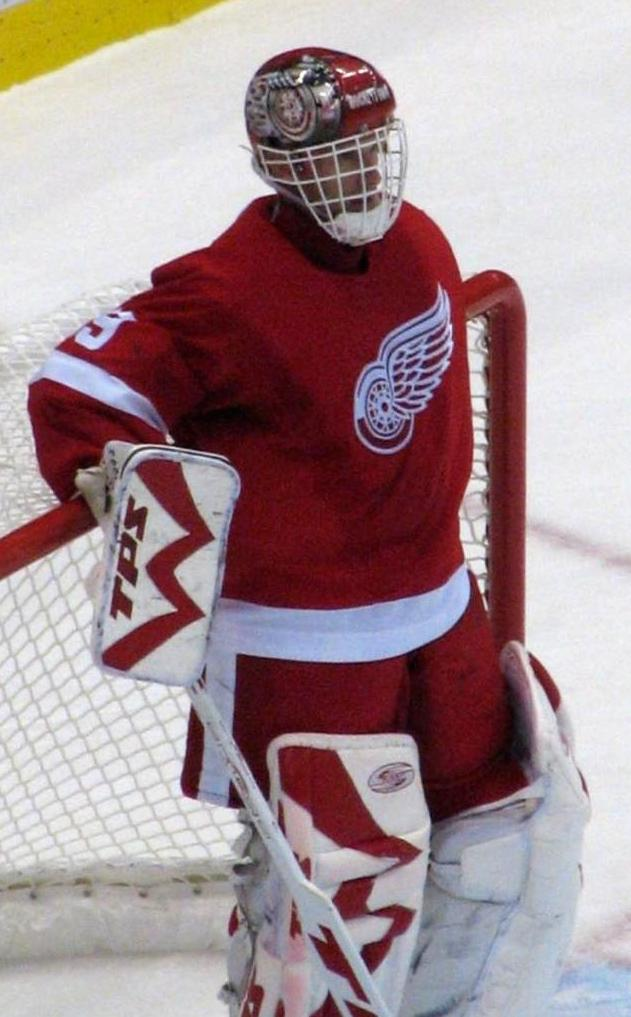
Dominik Hasek was selected for the NHL All-Star Team 6 times.

Season	Pos	First Team		Second Team	
Season	Pos	Player	Team(s)	Player	Team(s)
1967–68	C	**Stan Mikita*** (7)	Chicago Black Hawks	Phil Esposito*	Boston Bruins
1967–68	LW	Bobby Hull* (8)	Chicago Black Hawks	Johnny Bucyk*	Boston Bruins
1967–68	RW	Gordie Howe* (19)	Detroit Red Wings	Rod Gilbert*	New York Rangers
1967–68	D	Tim Horton* (5)	Toronto Maple Leafs	Jim Neilson	New York Rangers
1967–68	D	Bobby Orr* (2)	Boston Bruins	J. C. Tremblay	Montreal Canadiens
1967–68	G	Gump Worsley* (2)	Montreal Canadiens	Eddie Giacomin* (2)	New York Rangers
1968–69	C	**Phil Esposito*** (2)	Boston Bruins	Jean Beliveau* (10)	Montreal Canadiens
1968–69	LW	Bobby Hull* (9)	Chicago Black Hawks	Frank Mahovlich* (7)	Detroit Red Wings
1968–69	RW	Gordie Howe* (20)	Detroit Red Wings	Yvan Cournoyer*	Montreal Canadiens
1968–69	D	Tim Horton* (6)	Toronto Maple Leafs	Ted Green	Boston Bruins
1968–69	D	Bobby Orr* (3)	Boston Bruins	Ted Harris	Montreal Canadiens
1968–69	G	Glenn Hall* (11)	St. Louis Blues	Eddie Giacomin* (3)	New York Rangers
1969–70	C	Phil Esposito* (3)	Boston Bruins	Stan Mikita* (8)	Chicago Black Hawks
1969–70	LW	Bobby Hull* (10)	Chicago Black Hawks	Frank Mahovlich* (8)	Detroit Red Wings
1969–70	RW	Gordie Howe* (21)	Detroit Red Wings	John McKenzie	Boston Bruins
1969–70	D	**Bobby Orr*** (4)	Boston Bruins	Carl Brewer (4)	Detroit Red Wings
1969–70	D	Brad Park*	New York Rangers	Jacques Laperriere* (4)	Montreal Canadiens
1969–70	G	Tony Esposito*	Chicago Black Hawks	Eddie Giacomin* (4)	New York Rangers
1970–71	C	Phil Esposito* (4)	Boston Bruins	Dave Keon* (2)	Toronto Maple Leafs
1970–71	LW	Johnny Bucyk* (2)	Boston Bruins	Bobby Hull* (11)	Chicago Black Hawks
1970–71	RW	Ken Hodge	Boston Bruins	Yvan Cournoyer* (2)	Montreal Canadiens
1970–71	D	**Bobby Orr*** (5)	Boston Bruins	Brad Park* (2)	New York Rangers
1970–71	D	J. C. Tremblay (2)	Montreal Canadiens	Pat Stapleton (2)	Chicago Black Hawks
1970–71	G	Eddie Giacomin* (5)	New York Rangers	Jacques Plante* (7)	Toronto Maple Leafs
1971–72	C	Phil Esposito* (5)	Boston Bruins	Jean Ratelle*	New York Rangers
1971–72	LW	Bobby Hull* (12)	Chicago Black Hawks	Vic Hadfield	New York Rangers
1971–72	RW	Rod Gilbert* (2)	New York Rangers	Yvan Cournoyer* (3)	Montreal Canadiens
1971–72	D	**Bobby Orr*** (6)	Boston Bruins	Pat Stapleton (3)	Chicago Black Hawks
1971–72	D	Brad Park* (3)	New York Rangers	Bill White	Chicago Black Hawks
1971–72	G	Tony Esposito* (2)	Chicago Black Hawks	Ken Dryden*	Montreal Canadiens
1972–73	C	Phil Esposito* (6)	Boston Bruins	**Bobby Clarke***	Philadelphia Flyers
1972–73	LW	Frank Mahovlich* (9)	Montreal Canadiens	Dennis Hull	Chicago Black Hawks
1972–73	RW	Mickey Redmond	Detroit Red Wings	Yvan Cournoyer* (4)	Montreal Canadiens
1972–73	D	Guy Lapointe*	Montreal Canadiens	Brad Park* (4)	New York Rangers
1972–73	D	Bobby Orr* (7)	Boston Bruins	Bill White (2)	Chicago Black Hawks
1972–73	G	Ken Dryden* (2)	Montreal Canadiens	Tony Esposito* (3)	Chicago Black Hawks
1973–74	C	**Phil Esposito*** (7)	Boston Bruins	Bobby Clarke* (2)	Philadelphia Flyers
1973–74	LW	Rick Martin	Buffalo Sabres	Wayne Cashman	Boston Bruins
1973–74	RW	Ken Hodge (2)	Boston Bruins	Mickey Redmond (2)	Detroit Red Wings
1973–74	D	Bobby Orr* (8)	Boston Bruins	Barry Ashbee	Philadelphia Flyers
1973–74	D	Brad Park* (5)	New York Rangers	Bill White (3)	Chicago Black Hawks
1973–74	G	Bernie Parent*	Philadelphia Flyers	Tony Esposito* (4)	Chicago Black Hawks
1974–75	C	**Bobby Clarke*** (3)	Philadelphia Flyers	Phil Esposito* (8)	Boston Bruins
1974–75	LW	Rick Martin (2)	Buffalo Sabres	Steve Vickers	New York Rangers
1974–75	RW	Guy Lafleur*	Montreal Canadiens	Rene Robert	Buffalo Sabres
1974–75	D	Bobby Orr* (9)	Boston Bruins	Guy Lapointe* (2)	Montreal Canadiens
1974–75	D	Denis Potvin*	New York Islanders	Borje Salming*	Toronto Maple Leafs
1974–75	G	Bernie Parent* (2)	Philadelphia Flyers	Rogie Vachon*	Los Angeles Kings
1975–76	C	**Bobby Clarke*** (4)	Philadelphia Flyers	Gilbert Perreault*	Buffalo Sabres
1975–76	LW	Bill Barber*	Philadelphia Flyers	Rick Martin (3)	Buffalo Sabres
1975–76	RW	Guy Lafleur* (2)	Montreal Canadiens	Reggie Leach	Philadelphia Flyers
1975–76	D	Brad Park* (6)	New York Rangers; Boston Bruins	Guy Lapointe* (3)	Montreal Canadiens
1975–76	D	Denis Potvin* (2)	New York Islanders	Borje Salming* (2)	Toronto Maple Leafs
1975–76	G	Ken Dryden* (3)	Montreal Canadiens	Glenn Resch	New York Islanders
1976–77	C	Marcel Dionne*	Los Angeles Kings	Gilbert Perreault* (2)	Buffalo Sabres
1976–77	LW	Steve Shutt*	Montreal Canadiens	Rick Martin (4)	Buffalo Sabres
1976–77	RW	**Guy Lafleur*** (3)	Montreal Canadiens	Lanny McDonald*	Toronto Maple Leafs
1976–77	D	Larry Robinson*	Montreal Canadiens	Guy Lapointe* (4)	Montreal Canadiens
1976–77	D	Borje Salming* (3)	Toronto Maple Leafs	Denis Potvin* (3)	New York Islanders
1976–77	G	Ken Dryden* (4)	Montreal Canadiens	Rogie Vachon* (2)	Los Angeles Kings
1977–78	C	Bryan Trottier*	New York Islanders	Darryl Sittler*	Toronto Maple Leafs
1977–78	LW	Clark Gillies*	New York Islanders	Steve Shutt* (2)	Montreal Canadiens
1977–78	RW	**Guy Lafleur*** (4)	Montreal Canadiens	Mike Bossy*	New York Islanders
1977–78	D	Brad Park* (7)	Boston Bruins	Larry Robinson* (2)	Montreal Canadiens
1977–78	D	Denis Potvin* (4)	New York Islanders	Borje Salming* (4)	Toronto Maple Leafs
1977–78	G	Ken Dryden* (5)	Montreal Canadiens	Don Edwards	Buffalo Sabres
1978–79	C	**Bryan Trottier*** (2)	New York Islanders	Marcel Dionne* (2)	Los Angeles Kings
1978–79	LW	Clark Gillies* (2)	New York Islanders	Bill Barber* (2)	Philadelphia Flyers
1978–79	RW	Guy Lafleur* (5)	Montreal Canadiens	Mike Bossy* (2)	New York Islanders
1978–79	D	Denis Potvin* (5)	New York Islanders	Borje Salming* (5)	Toronto Maple Leafs
1978–79	D	Larry Robinson* (3)	Montreal Canadiens	Serge Savard*	Montreal Canadiens
1978–79	G	Ken Dryden* (6)	Montreal Canadiens	Glenn Resch (2)	New York Islanders
1979–80	C	Marcel Dionne* (3)	Los Angeles Kings	**Wayne Gretzky***	Edmonton Oilers
1979–80	LW	Charlie Simmer	Los Angeles Kings	Steve Shutt* (3)	Montreal Canadiens
1979–80	RW	Guy Lafleur* (6)	Montreal Canadiens	Danny Gare	Buffalo Sabres
1979–80	D	Ray Bourque*	Boston Bruins	Borje Salming* (6)	Toronto Maple Leafs
1979–80	D	Larry Robinson* (4)	Montreal Canadiens	Jim Schoenfeld	Buffalo Sabres
1979–80	G	Tony Esposito* (5)	Chicago Black Hawks	Don Edwards (2)	Buffalo Sabres
1980–81	C	**Wayne Gretzky*** (2)	Edmonton Oilers	Marcel Dionne* (4)	Los Angeles Kings
1980–81	LW	Charlie Simmer (2)	Los Angeles Kings	Bill Barber* (3)	Philadelphia Flyers
1980–81	RW	Mike Bossy* (3)	New York Islanders	Dave Taylor	Los Angeles Kings
1980–81	D	Randy Carlyle	Pittsburgh Penguins	Ray Bourque* (2)	Boston Bruins
1980–81	D	Denis Potvin* (6)	New York Islanders	Larry Robinson* (5)	Montreal Canadiens
1980–81	G	Mike Liut	St. Louis Blues	Mario Lessard	Los Angeles Kings
1981–82	C	**Wayne Gretzky*** (3)	Edmonton Oilers	Bryan Trottier* (3)	New York Islanders
1981–82	LW	Mark Messier*	Edmonton Oilers	John Tonelli	New York Islanders
1981–82	RW	Mike Bossy* (4)	New York Islanders	Rick Middleton	Boston Bruins
1981–82	D	Ray Bourque* (3)	Boston Bruins	Paul Coffey*	Edmonton Oilers
1981–82	D	Doug Wilson*	Chicago Black Hawks	Brian Engblom	Montreal Canadiens
1981–82	G	Billy Smith*	New York Islanders	Grant Fuhr*	Edmonton Oilers
1982–83	C	**Wayne Gretzky*** (4)	Edmonton Oilers	Denis Savard*	Chicago Black Hawks
1982–83	LW	Mark Messier* (2)	Edmonton Oilers	Michel Goulet*	Quebec Nordiques
1982–83	RW	Mike Bossy* (5)	New York Islanders	Lanny McDonald* (2)	Calgary Flames
1982–83	D	Mark Howe*	Philadelphia Flyers	Ray Bourque* (4)	Boston Bruins
1982–83	D	Rod Langway*	Washington Capitals	Paul Coffey* (2)	Edmonton Oilers
1982–83	G	Pete Peeters	Boston Bruins	Roland Melanson	New York Islanders
1983–84	C	**Wayne Gretzky*** (5)	Edmonton Oilers	Bryan Trottier* (4)	New York Islanders
1983–84	LW	Michel Goulet* (2)	Quebec Nordiques	Mark Messier* (3)	Edmonton Oilers
1983–84	RW	Mike Bossy* (6)	New York Islanders	Jari Kurri*	Edmonton Oilers
1983–84	D	Ray Bourque* (5)	Boston Bruins	Paul Coffey* (3)	Edmonton Oilers
1983–84	D	Rod Langway* (2)	Washington Capitals	Denis Potvin* (7)	New York Islanders
1983–84	G	Tom Barrasso*	Buffalo Sabres	Pat Riggin	Washington Capitals
1984–85	C	**Wayne Gretzky*** (6)	Edmonton Oilers	Dale Hawerchuk*	Winnipeg Jets
1984–85	LW	John Ogrodnick	Detroit Red Wings	John Tonelli (2)	New York Islanders
1984–85	RW	Jari Kurri* (2)	Edmonton Oilers	Mike Bossy* (7)	New York Islanders
1984–85	D	Ray Bourque* (6)	Boston Bruins	Rod Langway* (3)	Washington Capitals
1984–85	D	Paul Coffey* (4)	Edmonton Oilers	Doug Wilson* (2)	Chicago Black Hawks
1984–85	G	Pelle Lindbergh	Philadelphia Flyers	Tom Barrasso* (2)	Buffalo Sabres
1985–86	C	**Wayne Gretzky*** (7)	Edmonton Oilers	Mario Lemieux*	Pittsburgh Penguins
1985–86	LW	Michel Goulet* (3)	Quebec Nordiques	Mats Naslund	Montreal Canadiens
1985–86	RW	Mike Bossy* (8)	New York Islanders	Jari Kurri* (3)	Edmonton Oilers
1985–86	D	Paul Coffey* (5)	Edmonton Oilers	Ray Bourque* (7)	Boston Bruins
1985–86	D	Mark Howe* (2)	Philadelphia Flyers	Larry Robinson* (6)	Montreal Canadiens
1985–86	G	John Vanbiesbrouck	New York Rangers	Bob Froese	Philadelphia Flyers
1986–87	C	**Wayne Gretzky*** (8)	Edmonton Oilers	Mario Lemieux* (2)	Pittsburgh Penguins
1986–87	LW	Michel Goulet* (4)	Quebec Nordiques	Luc Robitaille*	Los Angeles Kings
1986–87	RW	Jari Kurri* (4)	Edmonton Oilers	Tim Kerr	Philadelphia Flyers
1986–87	D	Ray Bourque* (8)	Boston Bruins	Al MacInnis*	Calgary Flames
1986–87	D	Mark Howe* (3)	Philadelphia Flyers	Larry Murphy*	Washington Capitals
1986–87	G	Ron Hextall	Philadelphia Flyers	Mike Liut (2)	Hartford Whalers
1987–88	C	**Mario Lemieux*** (3)	Pittsburgh Penguins	Wayne Gretzky* (9)	Edmonton Oilers
1987–88	LW	Luc Robitaille* (2)	Los Angeles Kings	Michel Goulet* (5)	Quebec Nordiques
1987–88	RW	Haakon Loob	Calgary Flames	Cam Neely*	Boston Bruins
1987–88	D	Ray Bourque* (9)	Boston Bruins	Brad McCrimmon	Calgary Flames
1987–88	D	Scott Stevens*	Washington Capitals	Gary Suter	Calgary Flames
1987–88	G	Grant Fuhr* (2)	Edmonton Oilers	Patrick Roy*	Montreal Canadiens
1988–89	C	Mario Lemieux* (4)	Pittsburgh Penguins	**Wayne Gretzky*** (10)	Los Angeles Kings
1988–89	LW	Luc Robitaille* (3)	Los Angeles Kings	Gerard Gallant	Detroit Red Wings
1988–89	RW	Joe Mullen*	Calgary Flames	Jari Kurri* (5)	Edmonton Oilers
1988–89	D	Chris Chelios*	Montreal Canadiens	Ray Bourque* (10)	Boston Bruins
1988–89	D	Paul Coffey* (6)	Pittsburgh Penguins	Al MacInnis* (2)	Calgary Flames
1988–89	G	Patrick Roy* (2)	Montreal Canadiens	Mike Vernon*	Calgary Flames
1989–90	C	**Mark Messier*** (4)	Edmonton Oilers	Wayne Gretzky* (11)	Los Angeles Kings
1989–90	LW	Luc Robitaille* (4)	Los Angeles Kings	Brian Bellows	Minnesota North Stars
1989–90	RW	Brett Hull*	St. Louis Blues	Cam Neely* (2)	Boston Bruins
1989–90	D	Ray Bourque* (11)	Boston Bruins	Paul Coffey* (7)	Pittsburgh Penguins
1989–90	D	Al MacInnis* (3)	Calgary Flames	Doug Wilson* (3)	Chicago Blackhawks
1989–90	G	Patrick Roy* (3)	Montreal Canadiens	Daren Puppa	Buffalo Sabres
1990–91	C	Wayne Gretzky* (12)	Los Angeles Kings	Adam Oates*	St. Louis Blues
1990–91	LW	Luc Robitaille* (5)	Los Angeles Kings	Kevin Stevens	Pittsburgh Penguins
1990–91	RW	**Brett Hull*** (2)	St. Louis Blues	Cam Neely* (3)	Boston Bruins
1990–91	D	Ray Bourque* (12)	Boston Bruins	Chris Chelios* (2)	Chicago Blackhawks
1990–91	D	Al MacInnis* (4)	Calgary Flames	Brian Leetch*	New York Rangers
1990–91	G	Ed Belfour*	Chicago Blackhawks	Patrick Roy* (4)	Montreal Canadiens
1991–92	C	**Mark Messier*** (5)	New York Rangers	Mario Lemieux* (5)	Pittsburgh Penguins
1991–92	LW	Kevin Stevens (2)	Pittsburgh Penguins	Luc Robitaille* (6)	Los Angeles Kings
1991–92	RW	Brett Hull* (3)	St. Louis Blues	Mark Recchi*	Pittsburgh Penguins; Philadelphia Flyers
1991–92	D	Ray Bourque* (13)	Boston Bruins	Phil Housley*	Winnipeg Jets
1991–92	D	Brian Leetch* (2)	New York Rangers	Scott Stevens* (2)	New Jersey Devils
1991–92	G	Patrick Roy* (5)	Montreal Canadiens	Kirk McLean	Vancouver Canucks
1992–93	C	**Mario Lemieux*** (6)	Pittsburgh Penguins	Pat LaFontaine*	Buffalo Sabres
1992–93	LW	Luc Robitaille* (7)	Los Angeles Kings	Kevin Stevens (3)	Pittsburgh Penguins
1992–93	RW	Teemu Selanne*	Winnipeg Jets	Alexander Mogilny*	Buffalo Sabres
1992–93	D	Ray Bourque* (14)	Boston Bruins	Al Iafrate	Washington Capitals
1992–93	D	Chris Chelios* (3)	Chicago Blackhawks	Larry Murphy* (2)	Pittsburgh Penguins
1992–93	G	Ed Belfour* (2)	Chicago Blackhawks	Tom Barrasso* (3)	Pittsburgh Penguins
1993–94	C	**Sergei Fedorov***	Detroit Red Wings	Wayne Gretzky* (13)	Los Angeles Kings
1993–94	LW	Brendan Shanahan*	St. Louis Blues	Adam Graves	New York Rangers
1993–94	RW	Pavel Bure*	Vancouver Canucks	Cam Neely* (4)	Boston Bruins
1993–94	D	Ray Bourque* (15)	Boston Bruins	Brian Leetch* (3)	New York Rangers
1993–94	D	Scott Stevens* (3)	New Jersey Devils	Al MacInnis* (5)	Calgary Flames
1993–94	G	Dominik Hasek*	Buffalo Sabres	John Vanbiesbrouck (2)	Florida Panthers
1994–95	C	**Eric Lindros***	Philadelphia Flyers	Alexei Zhamnov	Winnipeg Jets
1994–95	LW	John LeClair	Montreal Canadiens; Philadelphia Flyers	Keith Tkachuk*	Winnipeg Jets
1994–95	RW	Jaromir Jagr^{†}	Pittsburgh Penguins	Theoren Fleury	Calgary Flames
1994–95	D	Chris Chelios* (4)	Chicago Blackhawks	Ray Bourque* (16)	Boston Bruins
1994–95	D	Paul Coffey* (8)	Detroit Red Wings	Larry Murphy* (3)	Pittsburgh Penguins
1994–95	G	Dominik Hasek* (2)	Buffalo Sabres	Ed Belfour* (3)	Chicago Blackhawks
1995–96	C	**Mario Lemieux*** (7)	Pittsburgh Penguins	Eric Lindros* (2)	Philadelphia Flyers
1995–96	LW	Paul Kariya*	Mighty Ducks of Anaheim	John LeClair (2)	Philadelphia Flyers
1995–96	RW	Jaromir Jagr^{†} (2)	Pittsburgh Penguins	Alexander Mogilny* (2)	Vancouver Canucks
1995–96	D	Ray Bourque* (17)	Boston Bruins	Vladimir Konstantinov	Detroit Red Wings
1995–96	D	Chris Chelios* (5)	Chicago Blackhawks	Brian Leetch* (4)	New York Rangers
1995–96	G	Jim Carey	Washington Capitals	Chris Osgood	Detroit Red Wings
1996–97	C	Mario Lemieux* (8)	Pittsburgh Penguins	Wayne Gretzky* (14)	New York Rangers
1996–97	LW	Paul Kariya* (2)	Mighty Ducks of Anaheim	John LeClair (3)	Philadelphia Flyers
1996–97	RW	Teemu Selanne* (2)	Mighty Ducks of Anaheim	Jaromir Jagr^{†} (3)	Pittsburgh Penguins
1996–97	D	Brian Leetch* (5)	New York Rangers	Chris Chelios* (6)	Chicago Blackhawks
1996–97	D	Sandis Ozolinsh	Colorado Avalanche	Scott Stevens* (4)	New Jersey Devils
1996–97	G	**Dominik Hasek*** (3)	Buffalo Sabres	Martin Brodeur*	New Jersey Devils
1997–98	C	Peter Forsberg*	Colorado Avalanche	Wayne Gretzky* (15)	New York Rangers
1997–98	LW	John LeClair (4)	Philadelphia Flyers	Keith Tkachuk* (2)	Phoenix Coyotes
1997–98	RW	Jaromir Jagr^{†} (4)	Pittsburgh Penguins	Temmu Selanne* (3)	Mighty Ducks of Anaheim
1997–98	D	Rob Blake*	Los Angeles Kings	Scott Niedermayer*	New Jersey Devils
1997–98	D	Nicklas Lidstrom*	Detroit Red Wings	Chris Pronger*	St. Louis Blues
1997–98	G	**Dominik Hasek*** (4)	Buffalo Sabres	Martin Brodeur* (2)	New Jersey Devils
1998–99	C	Peter Forsberg* (2)	Colorado Avalanche	Alexei Yashin	Ottawa Senators
1998–99	LW	Paul Kariya* (3)	Mighty Ducks of Anaheim	John LeClair (5)	Philadelphia Flyers
1998–99	RW	**Jaromir Jagr**^{†} (5)	Pittsburgh Penguins	Teemu Selanne* (4)	Mighty Ducks of Anaheim
1998–99	D	Nicklas Lidstrom* (2)	Detroit Red Wings	Ray Bourque* (18)	Boston Bruins
1998–99	D	Al MacInnis* (6)	St. Louis Blues	Eric Desjardins	Philadelphia Flyers
1998–99	G	Dominik Hasek* (5)	Buffalo Sabres	Byron Dafoe	Boston Bruins
1999–2000	C	Steve Yzerman*	Detroit Red Wings	Mike Modano*	Dallas Stars
1999–2000	LW	Brendan Shanahan* (2)	Detroit Red Wings	Paul Kariya* (4)	Mighty Ducks of Anaheim
1999–2000	RW	Jaromir Jagr^{†} (6)	Pittsburgh Penguins	Pavel Bure* (2)	Florida Panthers
1999–2000	D	Nicklas Lidstrom* (3)	Detroit Red Wings	Rob Blake* (2)	Los Angeles Kings
1999–2000	D	**Chris Pronger*** (2)	St. Louis Blues	Eric Desjardins (2)	Philadelphia Flyers
1999–2000	G	Olaf Kolzig	Washington Capitals	Roman Turek	St. Louis Blues
2000–01	C	**Joe Sakic***	Colorado Avalanche	Mario Lemieux* (9)	Pittsburgh Penguins
2000–01	LW	Patrik Elias	New Jersey Devils	Luc Robitaille* (8)	Los Angeles Kings
2000–01	RW	Jaromir Jagr^{†} (7)	Pittsburgh Penguins	Pavel Bure* (3)	Florida Panthers
2000–01	D	Ray Bourque* (19)	Colorado Avalanche	Rob Blake* (3)	Los Angeles Kings; Colorado Avalanche
2000–01	D	Nicklas Lidstrom* (4)	Detroit Red Wings	Scott Stevens* (5)	New Jersey Devils
2000–01	G	Dominik Hasek* (6)	Buffalo Sabres	Roman Cechmanek	Philadelphia Flyers
2001–02	C	Joe Sakic* (2)	Colorado Avalanche	Mats Sundin*	Toronto Maple Leafs
2001–02	LW	Markus Naslund	Vancouver Canucks	Brendan Shanahan* (3)	Detroit Red Wings
2001–02	RW	Jarome Iginla*	Calgary Flames	Bill Guerin	Boston Bruins
2001–02	D	Chris Chelios* (7)	Detroit Red Wings	Rob Blake* (4)	Colorado Avalanche
2001–02	D	Nicklas Lidstrom* (5)	Detroit Red Wings	Sergei Gonchar	Washington Capitals
2001–02	G	Patrick Roy* (6)	Colorado Avalanche	**Jose Theodore**	Montreal Canadiens
2002–03	C	**Peter Forsberg*** (3)	Colorado Avalanche	Joe Thornton*	Boston Bruins
2002–03	LW	Markus Naslund (2)	Vancouver Canucks	Paul Kariya* (5)	Mighty Ducks of Anaheim
2002–03	RW	Todd Bertuzzi	Vancouver Canucks	Milan Hejduk	Colorado Avalanche
2002–03	D	Nicklas Lidstrom* (6)	Detroit Red Wings	Sergei Gonchar (2)	Washington Capitals
2002–03	D	Al MacInnis* (7)	St. Louis Blues	Derian Hatcher	Dallas Stars
2002–03	G	Martin Brodeur* (3)	New Jersey Devils	Marty Turco	Dallas Stars
2003–04	C	Joe Sakic* (3)	Colorado Avalanche	Mats Sundin* (2)	Toronto Maple Leafs
2003–04	LW	Markus Naslund (3)	Vancouver Canucks	Ilya Kovalchuk^{†}	Atlanta Thrashers
2003–04	RW	**Martin St. Louis***	Tampa Bay Lightning	Jarome Iginla* (2)	Calgary Flames
2003–04	D	Zdeno Chara*	Ottawa Senators	Bryan McCabe	Toronto Maple Leafs
2003–04	D	Scott Niedermayer* (2)	New Jersey Devils	Chris Pronger* (3)	St. Louis Blues
2003–04	G	Martin Brodeur* (4)	New Jersey Devils	Roberto Luongo*	Florida Panthers
2004–05	Season cancelled due to the 2004–05 NHL lockout				

=== Post-lockout era (2005–06 to present) ===
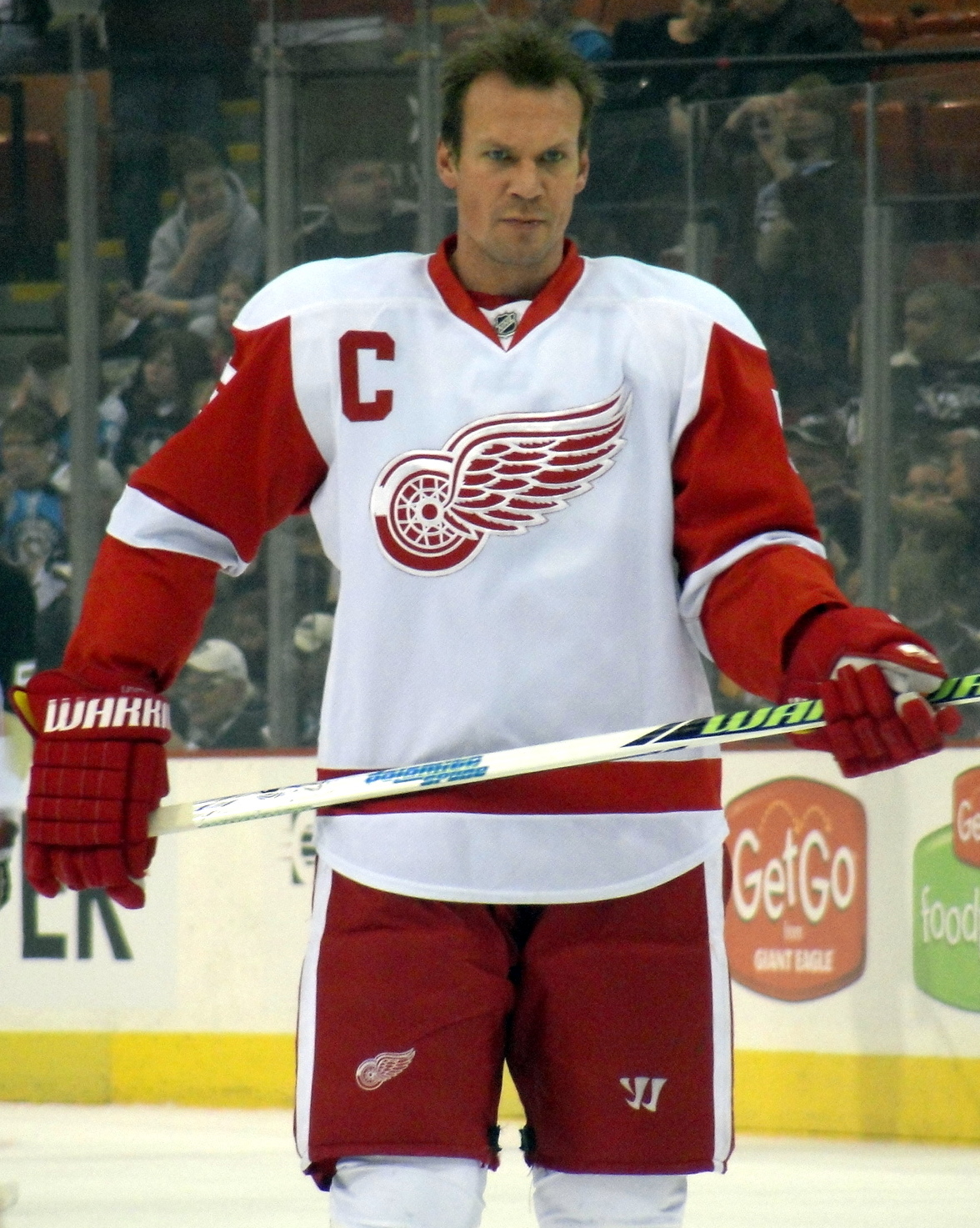
Nicklas Lidstrom was selected for the NHL All-Star Team 12 times.

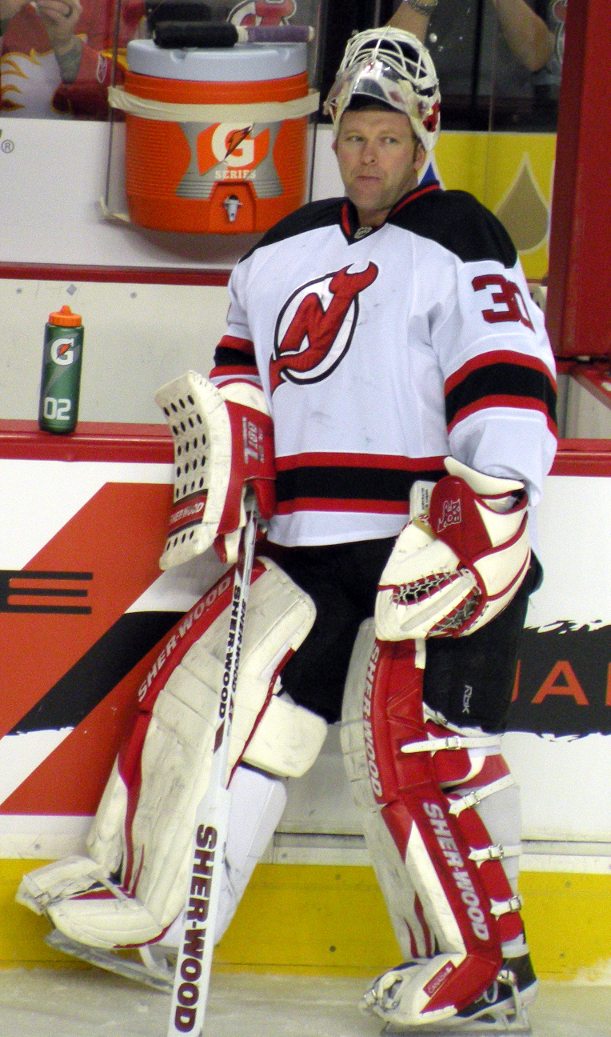
Martin Brodeur was selected for the NHL All-Star Team 7 times.

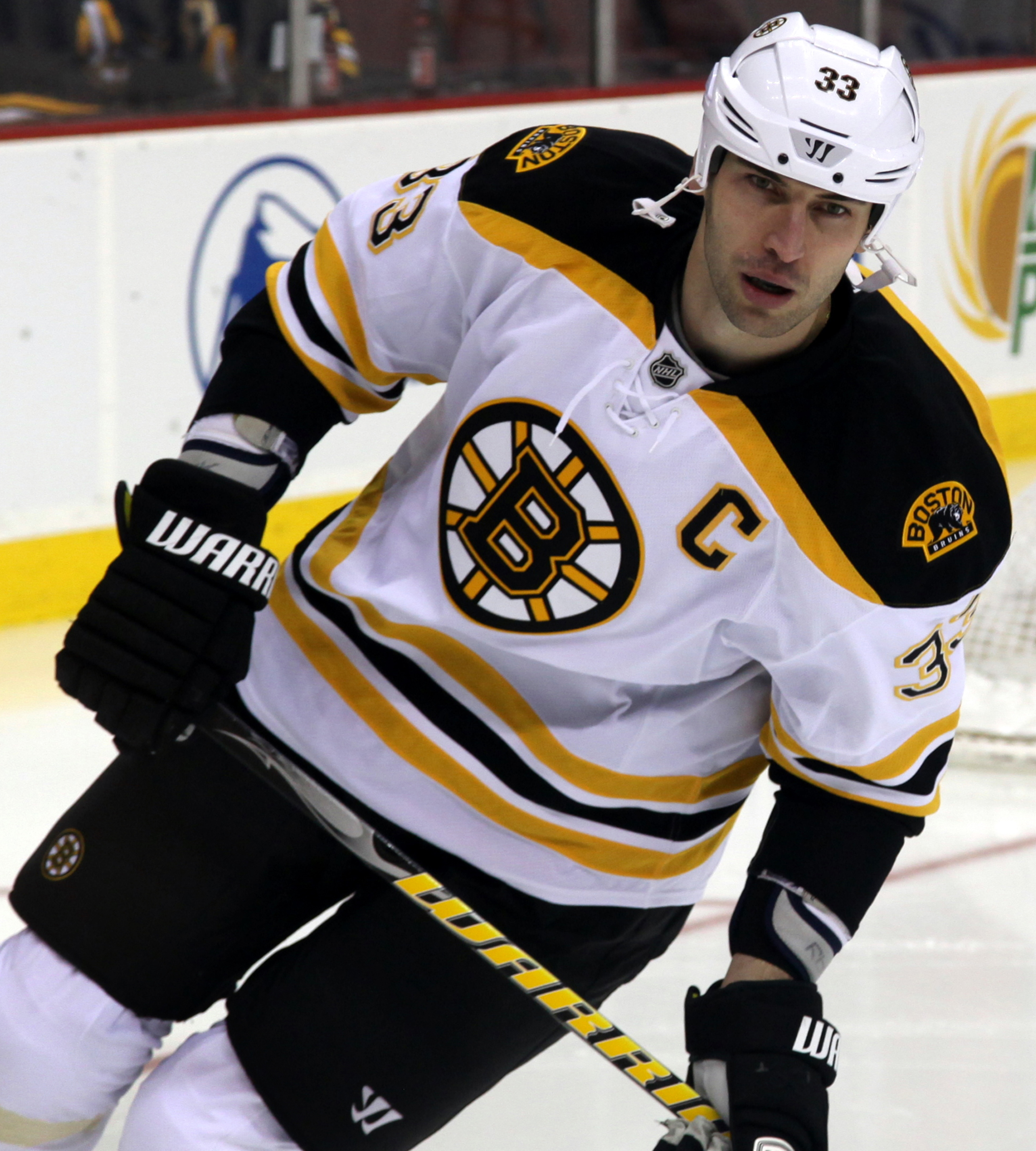
Zdeno Chara was selected for the NHL All-Star Team 7 times.

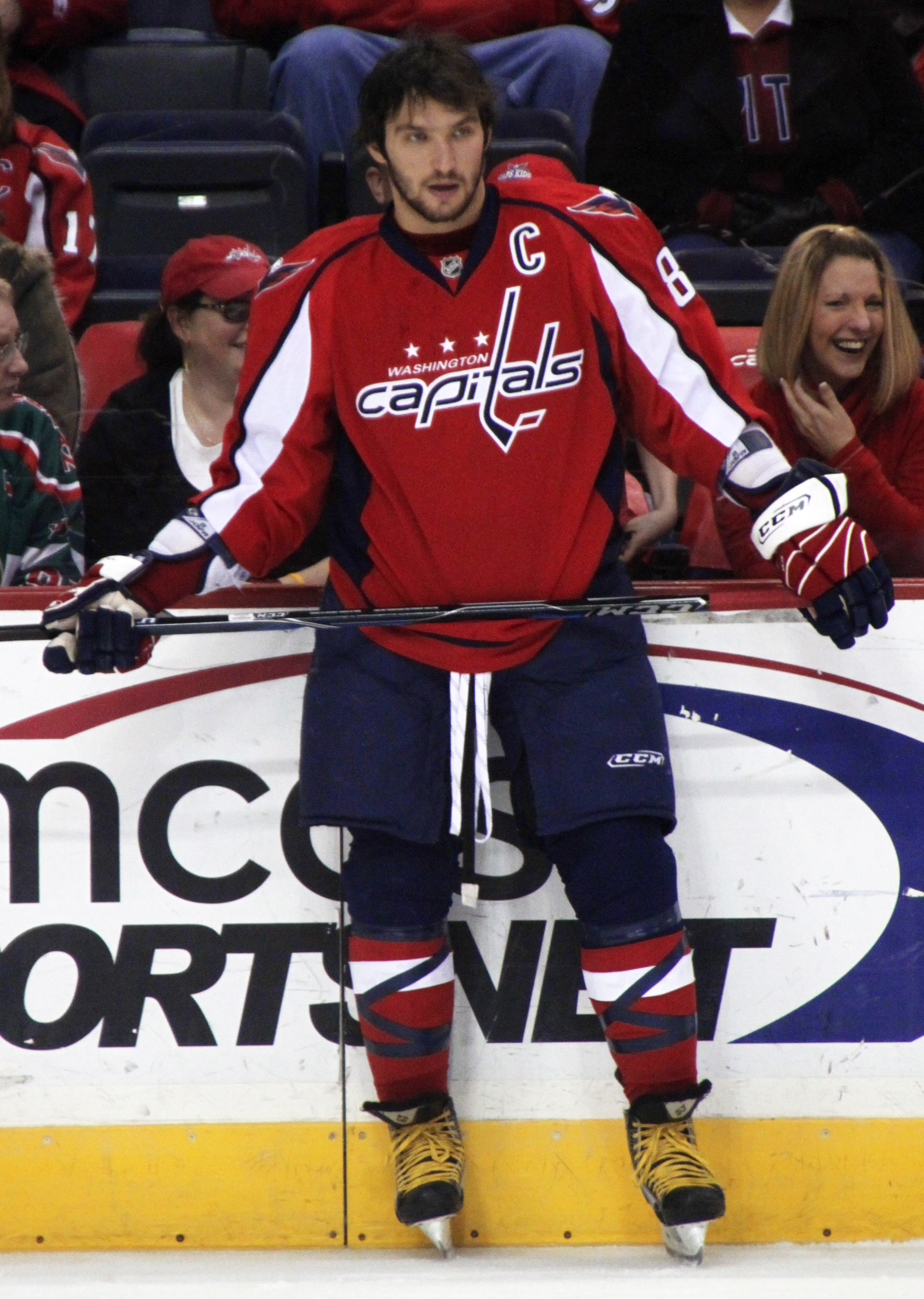
Alexander Ovechkin has been selected to the NHL All-Star Team 12 times.

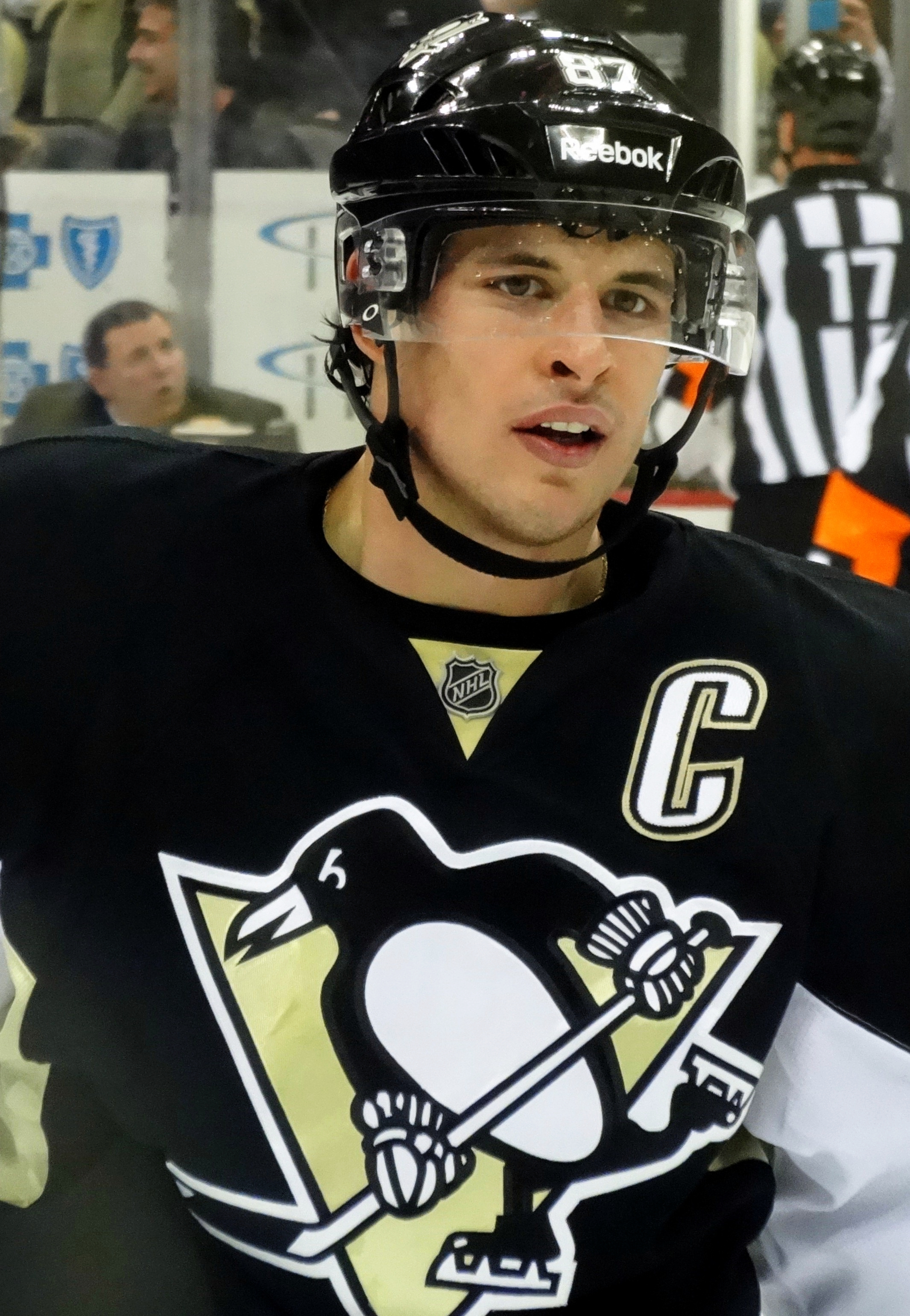
Sidney Crosby has been selected to the NHL All-Star Team 8 times.

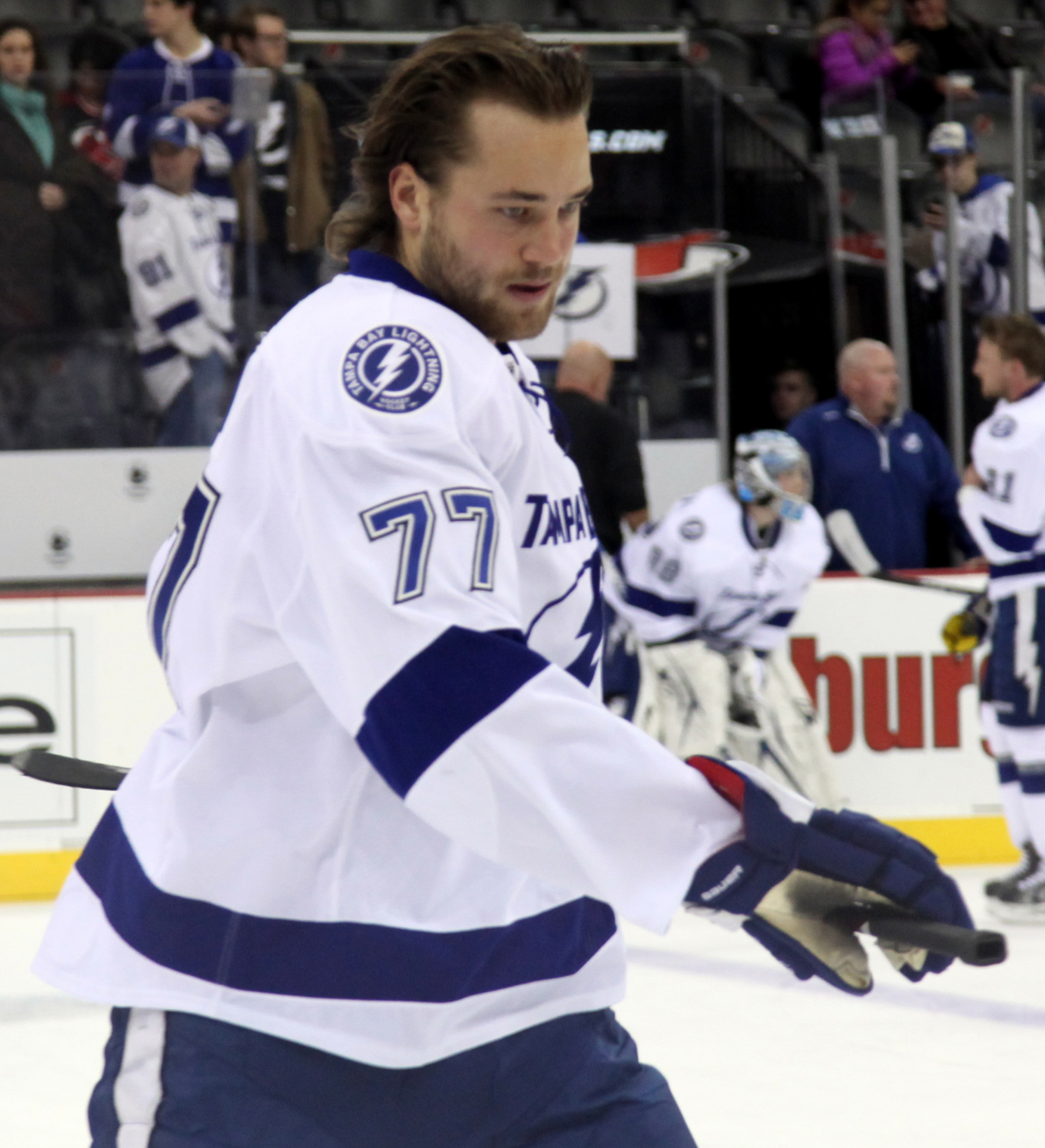
Victor Hedman has been selected to the NHL All-Star Team 7 times.

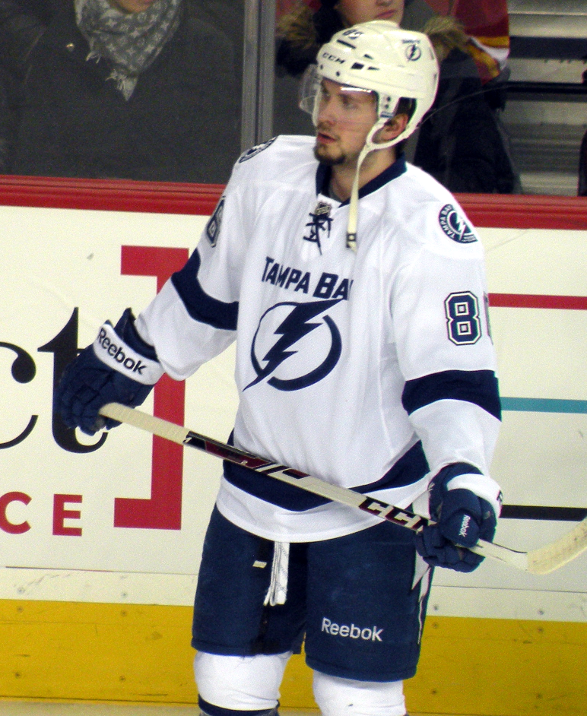
Nikita Kucherov has been selected to the NHL All-Star Team 7 times.

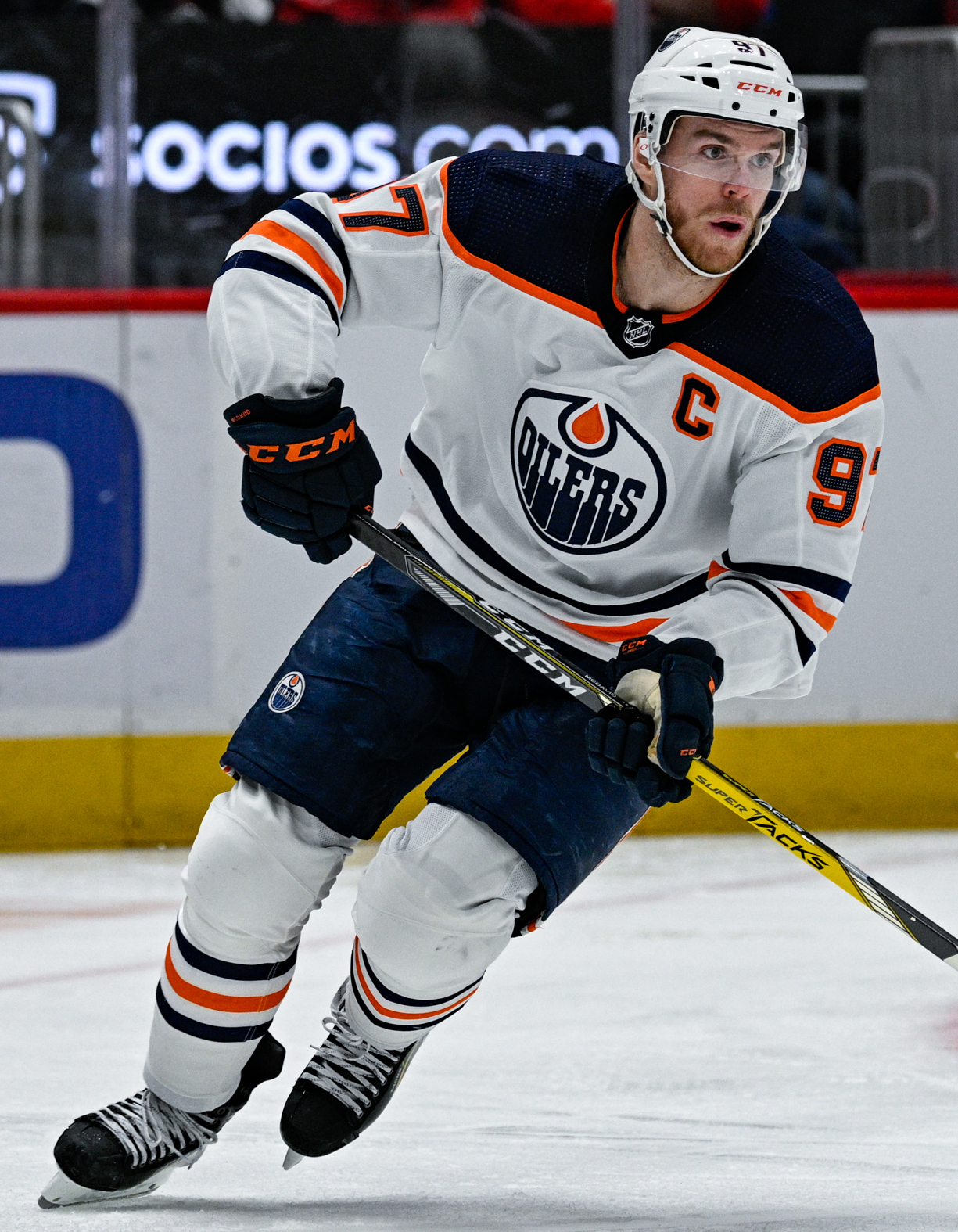
Connor McDavid has been selected to the NHL All-Star Team 8 times.

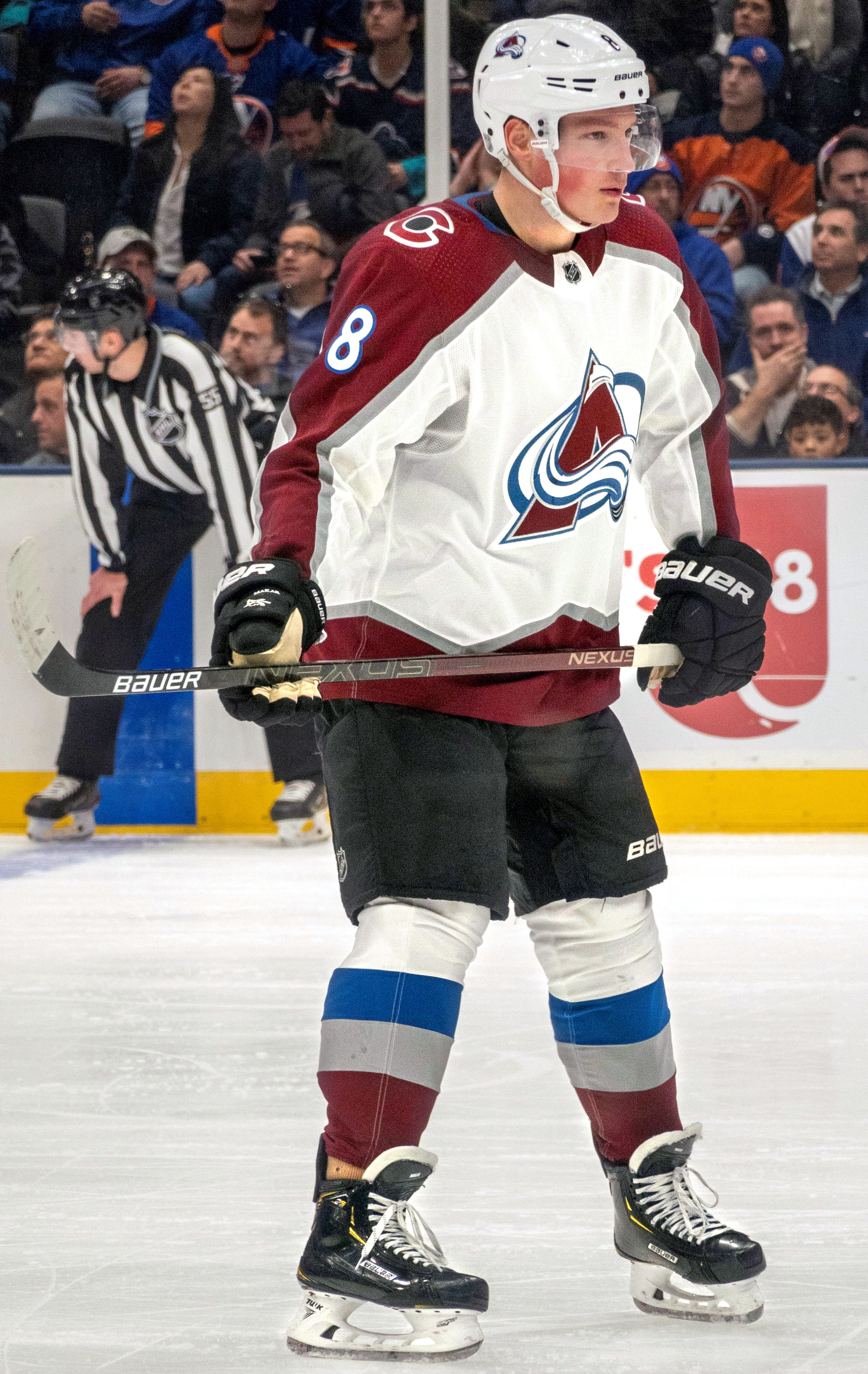
Cale Makar has been selected to the NHL All-Star 6 times.

Season	Pos	First Team		Second Team	
Season	Pos	Player	Team(s)	Player	Team(s)
2005–06	C	**Joe Thornton*** (2)	Boston Bruins; San Jose Sharks	Eric Staal	Carolina Hurricanes
2005–06	LW	Alexander Ovechkin^	Washington Capitals	Dany Heatley	Ottawa Senators
2005–06	RW	Jaromir Jagr^{†} (8)	New York Rangers	Daniel Alfredsson*	Ottawa Senators
2005–06	D	Nicklas Lidstrom* (7)	Detroit Red Wings	Zdeno Chara* (2)	Ottawa Senators
2005–06	D	Scott Niedermayer* (3)	Mighty Ducks of Anaheim	Sergei Zubov*	Dallas Stars
2005–06	G	Miikka Kiprusoff	Calgary Flames	Martin Brodeur* (5)	New Jersey Devils
2006–07	C	**Sidney Crosby**^	Pittsburgh Penguins	Vincent Lecavalier	Tampa Bay Lightning
2006–07	LW	Alexander Ovechkin^ (2)	Washington Capitals	Thomas Vanek	Buffalo Sabres
2006–07	RW	Dany Heatley (2)	Ottawa Senators	Martin St. Louis* (2)	Tampa Bay Lightning
2006–07	D	Nicklas Lidstrom* (8)	Detroit Red Wings	Dan Boyle	Tampa Bay Lightning
2006–07	D	Scott Niedermayer* (4)	Anaheim Ducks	Chris Pronger* (4)	Anaheim Ducks
2006–07	G	Martin Brodeur* (6)	New Jersey Devils	Roberto Luongo* (2)	Vancouver Canucks
2007–08	C	Evgeni Malkin^	Pittsburgh Penguins	Joe Thornton* (3)	San Jose Sharks
2007–08	LW	**Alexander Ovechkin**^ (3)	Washington Capitals	Henrik Zetterberg	Detroit Red Wings
2007–08	RW	Jarome Iginla* (3)	Calgary Flames	Alexei Kovalev	Montreal Canadiens
2007–08	D	Nicklas Lidstrom* (9)	Detroit Red Wings	Brian Campbell	Buffalo Sabres; San Jose Sharks
2007–08	D	Dion Phaneuf	Calgary Flames	Zdeno Chara* (3)	Boston Bruins
2007–08	G	Evgeni Nabokov	San Jose Sharks	Martin Brodeur* (7)	New Jersey Devils
2008–09	C	Evgeni Malkin^ (2)	Pittsburgh Penguins	Pavel Datsyuk*	Detroit Red Wings
2008–09	LW	**Alexander Ovechkin**^ (4)	Washington Capitals	Zach Parise^{†}	New Jersey Devils
2008–09	RW	Jarome Iginla* (4)	Calgary Flames	Marian Hossa*	Detroit Red Wings
2008–09	D	Zdeno Chara* (4)	Boston Bruins	Dan Boyle (2)	San Jose Sharks
2008–09	D	Mike Green	Washington Capitals	Nicklas Lidstrom* (10)	Detroit Red Wings
2008–09	G	Tim Thomas	Boston Bruins	Steve Mason	Columbus Blue Jackets
2009–10	C	**Henrik Sedin***	Vancouver Canucks	Sidney Crosby^ (2)	Pittsburgh Penguins
2009–10	LW	Alexander Ovechkin^ (5)	Washington Capitals	Daniel Sedin*	Vancouver Canucks
2009–10	RW	Patrick Kane^	Chicago Blackhawks	Martin St. Louis* (3)	Tampa Bay Lightning
2009–10	D	Mike Green (2)	Washington Capitals	Drew Doughty^	Los Angeles Kings
2009–10	D	Duncan Keith*	Chicago Blackhawks	Nicklas Lidstrom* (11)	Detroit Red Wings
2009–10	G	Ryan Miller	Buffalo Sabres	Ilya Bryzgalov	Phoenix Coyotes
2010–11	C	Henrik Sedin* (2)	Vancouver Canucks	Steven Stamkos^	Tampa Bay Lightning
2010–11	LW	Daniel Sedin* (2)	Vancouver Canucks	Alexander Ovechkin^ (6)	Washington Capitals
2010–11	RW	**Corey Perry**^	Anaheim Ducks	Martin St. Louis* (4)	Tampa Bay Lightning
2010–11	D	Nicklas Lidstrom* (12)	Detroit Red Wings	Zdeno Chara* (5)	Boston Bruins
2010–11	D	Shea Weber*	Nashville Predators	Lubomir Visnovsky	Anaheim Ducks
2010–11	G	Tim Thomas (2)	Boston Bruins	Pekka Rinne*	Nashville Predators
2011–12	C	**Evgeni Malkin**^ (3)	Pittsburgh Penguins	Steven Stamkos^ (2)	Tampa Bay Lightning
2011–12	LW	Ilya Kovalchuk^{†} (2)	New Jersey Devils	Ray Whitney	Phoenix Coyotes
2011–12	RW	James Neal	Pittsburgh Penguins	Marian Gaborik	New York Rangers
2011–12	D	Erik Karlsson^	Ottawa Senators	Zdeno Chara* (6)	Boston Bruins
2011–12	D	Shea Weber* (2)	Nashville Predators	Alex Pietrangelo^{†}	St. Louis Blues
2011–12	G	Henrik Lundqvist*	New York Rangers	Jonathan Quick^{†}	Los Angeles Kings
2012–13	C	Sidney Crosby^ (3)	Pittsburgh Penguins	Jonathan Toews^{†}	Chicago Blackhawks
2012–13	LW	Chris Kunitz	Pittsburgh Penguins	**Alexander Ovechkin**^ (8)	Washington Capitals
2012–13	RW	**Alexander Ovechkin**^ (7)	Washington Capitals	Martin St. Louis* (5)	Tampa Bay Lightning
2012–13	D	P. K. Subban	Montreal Canadiens	Francois Beauchemin	Anaheim Ducks
2012–13	D	Ryan Suter^{†}	Minnesota Wild	Kris Letang^	Pittsburgh Penguins
2012–13	G	Sergei Bobrovsky^	Columbus Blue Jackets	Henrik Lundqvist* (2)	New York Rangers
2013–14	C	**Sidney Crosby**^ (4)	Pittsburgh Penguins	Ryan Getzlaf	Anaheim Ducks
2013–14	LW	Jamie Benn^	Dallas Stars	Joe Pavelski^{†}	San Jose Sharks
2013–14	RW	Corey Perry^ (2)	Anaheim Ducks	Alexander Ovechkin^ (9)	Washington Capitals
2013–14	D	Zdeno Chara* (7)	Boston Bruins	Alex Pietrangelo^{†} (2)	St. Louis Blues
2013–14	D	Duncan Keith* (2)	Chicago Blackhawks	Shea Weber* (3)	Nashville Predators
2013–14	G	Tuukka Rask	Boston Bruins	Semyon Varlamov^	Colorado Avalanche
2014–15	C	John Tavares^	New York Islanders	Sidney Crosby^ (5)	Pittsburgh Penguins
2014–15	LW	Alexander Ovechkin^ (10)	Washington Capitals	Jamie Benn^ (2)	Dallas Stars
2014–15	RW	Jakub Voracek	Philadelphia Flyers	Vladimir Tarasenko^	St. Louis Blues
2014–15	D	Erik Karlsson^ (2)	Ottawa Senators	Drew Doughty^ (2)	Los Angeles Kings
2014–15	D	P. K. Subban (2)	Montreal Canadiens	Shea Weber* (4)	Nashville Predators
2014–15	G	**Carey Price***	Montreal Canadiens	Devan Dubnyk	Arizona Coyotes; Minnesota Wild
2015–16	C	Sidney Crosby^ (6)	Pittsburgh Penguins	Joe Thornton* (4)	San Jose Sharks
2015–16	LW	Jamie Benn^ (3)	Dallas Stars	Alexander Ovechkin^ (11)	Washington Capitals
2015–16	RW	**Patrick Kane**^ (2)	Chicago Blackhawks	Vladimir Tarasenko^ (2)	St. Louis Blues
2015–16	D	Drew Doughty^ (3)	Los Angeles Kings	Brent Burns^	San Jose Sharks
2015–16	D	Erik Karlsson^ (3)	Ottawa Senators	Kris Letang^ (2)	Pittsburgh Penguins
2015–16	G	Braden Holtby	Washington Capitals	Ben Bishop	Tampa Bay Lightning
2016–17	C	**Connor McDavid**^	Edmonton Oilers	Sidney Crosby^ (7)	Pittsburgh Penguins
2016–17	LW	Brad Marchand^	Boston Bruins	Artemi Panarin^	Chicago Blackhawks
2016–17	RW	Patrick Kane^ (3)	Chicago Blackhawks	Nikita Kucherov^	Tampa Bay Lightning
2016–17	D	Brent Burns^ (2)	San Jose Sharks	Victor Hedman^	Tampa Bay Lightning
2016–17	D	Erik Karlsson^ (4)	Ottawa Senators	Duncan Keith* (3)	Chicago Blackhawks
2016–17	G	Sergei Bobrovsky^ (2)	Columbus Blue Jackets	Braden Holtby (2)	Washington Capitals
2017–18	C	Connor McDavid^ (2)	Edmonton Oilers	Nathan MacKinnon^	Colorado Avalanche
2017–18	LW	**Taylor Hall**^	New Jersey Devils	Claude Giroux^	Philadelphia Flyers
2017–18	RW	Nikita Kucherov^ (2)	Tampa Bay Lightning	Blake Wheeler^{†}	Winnipeg Jets
2017–18	D	Drew Doughty^ (4)	Los Angeles Kings	Seth Jones^	Columbus Blue Jackets
2017–18	D	Victor Hedman^ (2)	Tampa Bay Lightning	P. K. Subban (3)	Nashville Predators
2017–18	G	Pekka Rinne* (2)	Nashville Predators	Connor Hellebuyck^	Winnipeg Jets
2018–19	C	Connor McDavid^ (3)	Edmonton Oilers	Sidney Crosby^ (8)	Pittsburgh Penguins
2018–19	LW	Alexander Ovechkin^ (12)	Washington Capitals	Brad Marchand^ (2)	Boston Bruins
2018–19	RW	**Nikita Kucherov**^ (3)	Tampa Bay Lightning	Patrick Kane^ (4)	Chicago Blackhawks
2018–19	D	Brent Burns^ (3)	San Jose Sharks	John Carlson^	Washington Capitals
2018–19	D	Mark Giordano^{†}	Calgary Flames	Victor Hedman^ (3)	Tampa Bay Lightning
2018–19	G	Andrei Vasilevskiy^	Tampa Bay Lightning	Ben Bishop (2)	Dallas Stars
2019–20	C	**Leon Draisaitl**^	Edmonton Oilers	Nathan MacKinnon^ (2)	Colorado Avalanche
2019–20	LW	Artemi Panarin^ (2)	New York Rangers	Brad Marchand^ (3)	Boston Bruins
2019–20	RW	David Pastrnak^	Boston Bruins	Nikita Kucherov^ (4)	Tampa Bay Lightning
2019–20	D	John Carlson^ (2)	Washington Capitals	Victor Hedman^ (4)	Tampa Bay Lightning
2019–20	D	Roman Josi^	Nashville Predators	Alex Pietrangelo^{†} (3)	St. Louis Blues
2019–20	G	Connor Hellebuyck^ (2)	Winnipeg Jets	Tuukka Rask (2)	Boston Bruins
2020–21	C	**Connor McDavid**^ (4)	Edmonton Oilers	Auston Matthews^	Toronto Maple Leafs
2020–21	LW	Brad Marchand^ (4)	Boston Bruins	Jonathan Huberdeau^	Florida Panthers
2020–21	RW	Mitch Marner^	Toronto Maple Leafs	Mikko Rantanen^	Colorado Avalanche
2020–21	D	Adam Fox^	New York Rangers	Dougie Hamilton^	Carolina Hurricanes
2020–21	D	Cale Makar^	Colorado Avalanche	Victor Hedman^ (5)	Tampa Bay Lightning
2020–21	G	Andrei Vasilevskiy^ (2)	Tampa Bay Lightning	Marc-Andre Fleury^{†}	Vegas Golden Knights
2021–22	C	**Auston Matthews**^ (2)	Toronto Maple Leafs	Connor McDavid^ (5)	Edmonton Oilers
2021–22	LW	Johnny Gaudreau^{†}	Calgary Flames	Jonathan Huberdeau^ (2)	Florida Panthers
2021–22	RW	Mitch Marner^ (2)	Toronto Maple Leafs	Matthew Tkachuk^	Calgary Flames
2021–22	D	Roman Josi^ (2)	Nashville Predators	Victor Hedman^ (6)	Tampa Bay Lightning
2021–22	D	Cale Makar^ (2)	Colorado Avalanche	Charlie McAvoy^	Boston Bruins
2021–22	G	Igor Shesterkin^	New York Rangers	Jacob Markstrom^	Calgary Flames
2022–23	C	**Connor McDavid**^ (6)	Edmonton Oilers	Leon Draisaitl^ (2)	Edmonton Oilers
2022–23	LW	Jason Robertson^	Dallas Stars	Artemi Panarin^ (3)	New York Rangers
2022–23	RW	David Pastrnak^ (2)	Boston Bruins	Matthew Tkachuk^ (2)	Florida Panthers
2022–23	D	Adam Fox^ (2)	New York Rangers	Hampus Lindholm^	Boston Bruins
2022–23	D	Erik Karlsson^ (5)	San Jose Sharks	Cale Makar^ (3)	Colorado Avalanche
2022–23	G	Linus Ullmark^	Boston Bruins	Ilya Sorokin^	New York Islanders
2023–24	C	**Nathan MacKinnon**^ (3)	Colorado Avalanche	Connor McDavid^ (7)	Edmonton Oilers
2023–24	LW	Artemi Panarin^ (4)	New York Rangers	Filip Forsberg^	Nashville Predators
2023–24	RW	Nikita Kucherov^ (5)	Tampa Bay Lightning	David Pastrnak^ (3)	Boston Bruins
2023–24	D	Quinn Hughes^	Vancouver Canucks	Adam Fox^ (3)	New York Rangers
2023–24	D	Roman Josi^ (3)	Nashville Predators	Cale Makar^ (4)	Colorado Avalanche
2023–24	G	Connor Hellebuyck^ (3)	Winnipeg Jets	Thatcher Demko^	Vancouver Canucks
2024–25	C	Nathan MacKinnon^ (4)	Colorado Avalanche	Leon Draisaitl^ (3)	Edmonton Oilers
2024–25	LW	Kyle Connor^	Winnipeg Jets	Brandon Hagel^	Tampa Bay Lightning
2024–25	RW	Nikita Kucherov^ (6)	Tampa Bay Lightning	David Pastrnak^ (4)	Boston Bruins
2024–25	D	Cale Makar^ (5)	Colorado Avalanche	Victor Hedman^ (7)	Tampa Bay Lightning
2024–25	D	Zach Werenski^	Columbus Blue Jackets	Quinn Hughes^ (2)	Vancouver Canucks
2024–25	G	**Connor Hellebuyck**^ (4)	Winnipeg Jets	Andrei Vasilevskiy^ (3)	Tampa Bay Lightning
2025–26	C	Connor McDavid^ (8)	Edmonton Oilers	Nathan MacKinnon^ (5)	Colorado Avalanche
2025–26	LW	Jason Robertson^ (2)	Dallas Stars	Cole Caufield^	Montreal Canadiens
2025–26	RW	**Nikita Kucherov**^ (7)	Tampa Bay Lightning	David Pastrnak^ (5)	Boston Bruins
2025–26	D	Cale Makar^ (6)	Colorado Avalanche	Evan Bouchard^	Edmonton Oilers
2025–26	D	Zach Werenski^ (2)	Columbus Blue Jackets	Rasmus Dahlin^	Buffalo Sabres
2025–26	G	Andrei Vasilevskiy^ (4)	Tampa Bay Lightning	Logan Thompson^	Washington Capitals

== Most selections ==
The following table only lists players with at least eight total selections.

^	Denotes players who are still active in the NHL
*	Denotes players inducted to the Hockey Hall of Fame
†	Denotes inactive players not yet eligible for Hockey Hall of Fame consideration

Player	Pos	Total	First team	Second team	MVP (Hart)	Seasons
Gordie Howe*	RW	21	12	9	6	26
Ray Bourque*	D	19	13	6	0	22
Wayne Gretzky*	C	15	8	7	9	20
Maurice Richard*	RW	14	8	6	1	18
Bobby Hull*	LW	12	10	2	2	16
Nicklas Lidstrom*	D	12	10	2	0	20
Alexander Ovechkin^	LW/RW	12	8	4	3	21
Doug Harvey*	D	11	10	1	0	20
Glenn Hall*	G	11	7	4	0	18
Jean Beliveau*	C	10	6	4	2	20
Earl Seibert*	D	10	4	6	0	15
Bobby Orr*	D	9	8	1	3	12
Ted Lindsay*	LW	9	8	1	0	17
Mario Lemieux*	C	9	5	4	3	17
Frank Mahovlich*	LW	9	3	6	0	18
Dick Irvin*	Coach	9	3	6	—	27
Eddie Shore*	D	8	7	1	4	14
Jaromir Jagr^{†}	RW	8	7	1	1	24
Connor McDavid^	C	8	6	2	3	11
Phil Esposito*	C	8	6	2	2	18
Red Kelly*	D	8	6	2	0	20
Stan Mikita*	C	8	6	2	2	22
Mike Bossy*	RW	8	5	3	0	10
Pierre Pilote*	D	8	5	3	0	14
Luc Robitaille*	LW	8	5	3	0	19
Sidney Crosby^	C	8	4	4	2	21
Paul Coffey*	D	8	4	4	0	21
Frank Brimsek*	G	8	2	6	0	10

== See also ==
- NHL All-Star Game
- NHL All-Rookie Team
