= Johann Christoph Arnold =

- Born: November 14, 1940; England
- Died: April 15, 2017 (aged 76)
- Citizenship: United States
- Occupation: Pastor
- Spouse: Verena Arnold
- Relatives: Eberhard Arnold (grandfather)
- Writing career
- Language: English
- Subjects: Conflict resolution Death anxiety Marriage; Parenting

Johann Christoph Arnold (November 14, 1940 – April 15, 2017) was a Christian writer and pastor. He was the elder of the Bruderhof Communities between 1983 and 2001. Arnold authored 12 books.

== Life ==
Arnold is the son of Annemarie (née Wachter) and Johann Heinrich Arnold (1913–1982), and grandson of Eberhard Arnold (1883–1935), who co-founded the Bruderhof Communities in 1920. Arnold was born in the Cotswolds, where the Bruderhof fled from Nazi Germany. He traveled with his parents to Paraguay but then moved to New York in 1954. He lived in Rifton, New York, until his death in 2017. On May 22, 1966, he married Verena Meier with whom he had eight children.

Arnold helped found Breaking the Cycle of Violence, a conflict resolution program in the wake of the Columbine high school massacre. Through the program he spoke to school students and adults about the importance of forgiveness in the US, United Kingdom, Northern Ireland, Rwanda and other places. He traveled and spoke extensively with Steven McDonald, a US police officer who was shot and paralyzed, and who contributed to Arnold's book on forgiveness.

Arnold had a wide circle of friends and co-workers. On September 11, 2017, an event was held in New York City to commemorate his life. Speakers at the event included First Things editor R. R. Reno, veteran civil rights activist John M. Perkins, Professor Robert P. George of Princeton University, and others.

== Writing career ==
Arnold wrote a total of twelve books, covering a wide range of topics. The books are published by Plough Publishing House. Many of these books have become bestsellers and large numbers of copies have been given away for free, or are available as free e-books.

Arnold's best known book is Why Forgive?, which has been published in more than 10 languages. The book details the stories of people who have forgiven after negative life events. The book has been endorsed by Nelson Mandela, who said: "A much-needed message not only for South Africa, but for the whole world."

Read this book. It deals with some hard issues, head-on. It might give you more than you wanted to think about. But I think it will also help you see, as it helped me to see, that there are more stories of love and forgiveness in the world than there are of hatred and revenge.

— Steven McDonald

In 1996, Arnold wrote A Plea for Purity, later renamed Sex, God and Marriage. The book was endorsed by Pope Benedict XVI while he was still a cardinal saying "I am very happy for this book and for its moral conviction." The foreword was written by Mother Teresa, who wrote:

In this book we find a message needed today in every part of the world. To be pure, to remain pure, can only come at a price, the price of knowing God and of loving him enough to do his will. He will always give us the strength we need to keep purity as something beautiful for God. Purity is the fruit of prayer. If families pray together they will remain in unity and purity, and love each other as God loves each one of them."

Arnold's works are:

- Their Name Is Today: Reclaiming Childhood in a Hostile World, 2014 (previously titled Endangered: Your Child in a Hostile World)
- Rich in Years: Finding Peace and Purpose in a Long Life 2013.
- Why Children Matter, 2012.
- Why Forgive?, 2010.
- Be Not Afraid: Overcoming the Fear of Death, 2002. (previously titled I Tell You a Mystery: Life, Death, and Eternity)
- Seeking Peace: Notes and Conversations along the Way, 1998.
- Sex, God, and Marriage (previously titled A Plea for Purity: Sex, Marriage, and God)
- Cries from the Heart: Stories of Struggle and Hope
- Drained: Stories of People Who Wanted More
- Escape Routes: For People Who Feel Trapped in Life's Hells, 2016
- Seventy Times Seven, 1998
- A Little Child Shall Lead Them, 2005

== Anti-LGBT opinions ==
On September 26, 2011, Arnold served as keynote speaker and panelist at a panel discussion entitled “The Ring Makes the Difference”, held at the Bardavon Theater in Poughkeepsie. As part of his keynote, Arnold defended the “God-given” nature of heterosexual marriage. The event was denounced and actively picketed by several local LGBT groups.

On September 6, 2015, Arnold submitted a Letter to the Editor to a local Ulster County newspaper, The Kingston Daily Freeman, in defense of the Kentucky county clerk Kim Davis, who was controversially jailed for refusing to sign same-sex marriage certificates in her official capacity as County Clerk. Arnold added “I respect her courage”, in reference to Davis’ breach of legal duty.

In February 2016, Arnold publicly denounced the progression of transgender-friendly policies as likely to “harm our children greatly."
