= Emmy Arnold =

German Christian intentional community leader

- Born: Emmy von Hollander; 25 December 1884; Riga, Latvia
- Died: 15 January 1980 (aged 95); Rifton, New York, U.S.
- Spouse: Eberhard Arnold
- Children: Johann Heinrich Arnold
- Title: First Bruderhof

Emmy Arnold (born Emmy von Hollander; 25 December 1884 - 15 January 1980) was a German intentional community leader and Christian writer. She was the founder of the Bruderhof in 1920 with her husband, Eberhard Arnold.

== Early life ==
Emmy von Hollander was born on 25 December 1884 in Riga, Latvia. Her father was a law professor. Their family was German, wealthy, and respected. Following the policy of forced Russification by the Russian Empire, the von Hollanders moved to Germany.

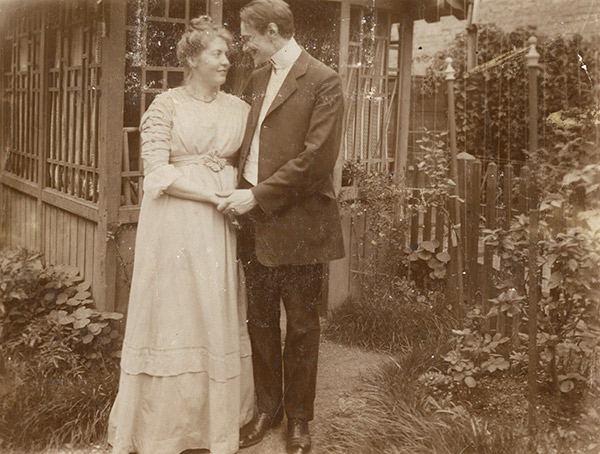
Emmy and Eberhard Arnold in Leipzig, 1910

Emmy met Eberhard Arnold in 1907. They were both deeply religious and were impressed by the Anabaptists they witnessed around Halle an der Saale. They were baptized in that tradition and married in December 1909.

== The Bruderhof ==
In early 1920, convinced by the events of World War I of a need for pacifism in the world, the Arnolds were influenced by the youth movement that had sprung up in the countryside. Emmy and Eberhard went to a 'life reform' settlement known as the Habertshof that had been established by the youth in 1919. Inspired by this example, the Arnolds joined with other Christians, including Emmy's sister Else, to found a commune in Sannerz-Schlüchtern, near Fulda. The couple had five children by this time. Under the leadership of Emmy and Eberhard, they called their community the Bruderhof. By 1922, the population of the community had reached 40. Emmy played a central role in the nascent community and "functioned as the first among equals" while Eberhard was absent on lecture trips. She became known as the "First Bruderhof".

== Escape from Nazis ==
A contingent of troopers and Gestapo officials came to the commune on 16 November 1933. Emmy held them at bay while her sister destroyed potentially incriminating documents. In anticipation of the arrival of the Nazis, the community sent their children to Switzerland and Emmy began making plans to relocate the Bruderhof. Eberhard died in 1936, due to complications from surgery. The following year, after the Nazis tried to conscript the men of the pacifist community, Emmy made plans to move them all to Liechtenstein. After the Nazis annexed Austria in March 1938, Emmy led the Bruderhof community to immigrate to Great Britain.

== Immigration and later life ==
After the end of World War II, Arnold led the Bruderhof immigration to Paraguay and then again to New York. During the late 1950s, while Emmy was in Paraguay, a delegation of Americans visited their community and reported an admission that her diaries and writings were confiscated and locked in a "poison cabinet". She died on 15 January 1980.
