= Johann Arnold =

Johann Arnold may refer to:

- Johann Christoph Arnold (1940–2017), British-American writer
- Johann Gottfried Arnold (1773–1806), German cellist
- Johann Heinrich Arnold (1913–1982), Elder of the Bruderhof Communities
