= She Said Yes: The Unlikely Martyrdom of Cassie Bernall =

1999 memoir by Misty Bernall

- First edition
- Author: Misty Bernall
- Language: English
- Genre: Memoir
- Publisher: Plough Publishing, Pocket Books
- Publication date: September 1, 1999
- Publication place: United States
- Pages: 142
- ISBN: 978-0-8499-1645-8

She Said Yes: The Unlikely Martyrdom of Cassie Bernall is a memoir by Misty Bernall about the life of her daughter Cassie Bernall who was killed during the Columbine High School massacre on April 20, 1999.

The book was published by Plough Publishing and released on September 1, 1999. It includes a foreword by Madeleine L'Engle. In September 2000 Pocket Books first printed their paperback edition.

The book spent five weeks on The New York Times Best Seller list, peaking at No. 8.

== Background ==
The book was published a little over four months after the death of Cassie Bernall in the Columbine High School Massacre.

== Contents ==
The book details the life of Cassie Bernall and her family's grieving process in the aftermath of her death. The book's title is a reference to what Bernall's final moments were erroneously reported to have been like. It had been widely reported that shooter Eric Harris had asked Bernall if she believed in God and when she responded with "yes", Harris shot and killed her, though in fact, no such exchange took place.

== Evidence against martyrdom claims ==
Multiple reliable sources, including eyewitnesses who were with Bernall when she was shot, the teen who initially reported that she had been the one asked about belief in God, an audio recording and the FBI, determined within months of the massacre that Bernall was never asked the question at all.

Craig Scott, a student who was in the library, where Bernall and 11 others (including the two killers) died — and the brother of Rachel Scott, the first victim killed in the incident during the massacre, told investigators that he had heard one of the shooters ask a victim whether or not they believed in God during the shooting, and the female victim answered, "yes." Scott, hiding under a table at the time, did not see the exchange, but told investigators the voice was Bernall's. However, months later when Scott visited the library with investigators, he identified the wrong location for Bernall, pointing instead to where survivor Valeen Schnurr had been hiding.

Schnurr lay on the floor, injured, saying, "Oh, my God, oh, my God, don't let me die." Klebold, who overheard this, approached, and asked her if she believed in God. She said she did, and when he asked why, she responded, "Because I believe and my parents brought me up that way." Klebold did not shoot her again.

In addition, Columbine student Emily Wyant, who was hiding beneath a table next to Bernall, told investigators that Eric Harris had shot her without asking her any questions at all. He merely knocked on the table twice and said, "Peekaboo." Another student hiding in the same location confirmed Wyant's account. Wyant told Bernall's parents prior to the publication of "She Said 'Yes'" that their daughter had not spoken to either killer.

Investigators were aware that Bernall had not spoken with the killers early in the investigation, and even had an audio recording of what actually happened, courtesy of Patti Nielson, an art teacher who was also in the library at the time of the massacre.

== Reception ==
People magazine called it "a stirring, important look into the tribulations of one all-too-human teen."

== See also ==
- Columbine, a 2009 book by Dave Cullen about the Columbine massacre
- A Mother's Reckoning, a 2016 memoir by Sue Klebold, mother of Columbine shooter Dylan Klebold
- Rachel's Tears, a 2000 book about Columbine victim Rachel Scott
