= Brian Leetch =

American ice hockey player (born 1968)

- Hockey Hall of Fame, 2009
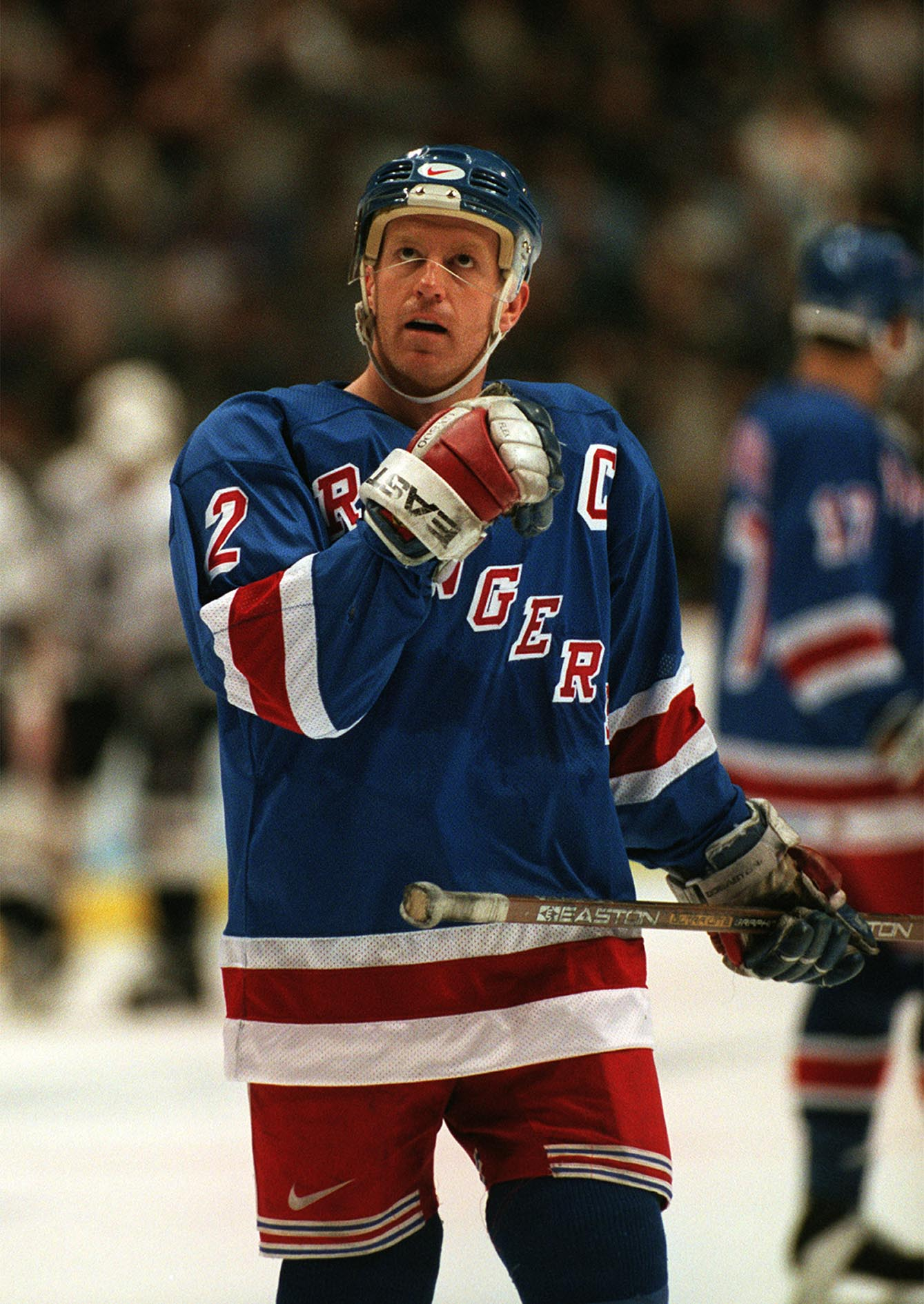
- Leetch with the New York Rangers in 1997
- Born: March 3, 1968 (age 58) Corpus Christi, Texas, U.S.
- Height: 6 ft 0 in (183 cm)
- Weight: 185 lb (84 kg; 13 st 3 lb)
- Position: Defense
- Shot: Left
- Played for: New York Rangers; Toronto Maple Leafs; Boston Bruins
- National team: United States
- NHL draft: 9th overall, 1986; New York Rangers
- Playing career: 1987–2006
Medal record
Men's ice hockey
Representing the United States
Olympic Games
Silver medal – second place	2002 Salt Lake City
World Cup of Hockey
Gold medal – first place	1996 United States
Canada Cup
Silver medal – second place	1991 Canada

Brian Joseph Leetch (born March 3, 1968) is an American former professional ice hockey defenseman who played 18 National Hockey League (NHL) seasons with the New York Rangers, Toronto Maple Leafs, and Boston Bruins. He has been called one of the top defensemen in NHL history.

Leetch accumulated many individual honors during his 18-year career. He was a two-time Norris Trophy winner as the NHL's best defenseman (1992, 1997) and was the first American-born winner of the Conn Smythe Trophy as playoff MVP for his performance during the Rangers' run to the 1994 Stanley Cup championship. Leetch is one of only six NHL defensemen to score 100 points in a season with his 102-point campaign in 1991–92. He won the Calder Trophy as the NHL Rookie of the Year in 1989 and his 23 goals that season set the NHL record for a rookie defenseman, a record that remains but is now shared with Matthew Schaefer who achieved the same feat in 2026.

Leetch's number 2 was retired by the Rangers on January 24, 2008. During the ceremony, longtime teammate Mark Messier referred to Leetch as the single "Greatest Ranger of All Time." Leetch was inducted into the Hockey Hall of Fame in Toronto in 2009, his first year of eligibility. In 2017 Leetch was named one of the "100 Greatest NHL Players" in history. He was inducted into the IIHF Hall of Fame in 2023.

== Biography ==
=== Early life ===
Leetch was born in Corpus Christi, Texas, but was raised in Cheshire, Connecticut, where his family moved when he was three months old. He first learned to play hockey at a local ice rink managed by his father, Jack. In high school, he starred in baseball and hockey, first at Cheshire High School, and then at Avon Old Farms. As a sophomore, Leetch's 90 mph fastball helped the Cheshire Rams baseball team to a state championship and, as a senior at Avon Old Farms, he set the school record for strikeouts in a game with 19. Hockey, however, was the sport in which he most excelled. As a sophomore at Cheshire, he scored 53 goals and 50 assists, earning All-state honors.

In two seasons with Avon Old Farms, Leetch scored 70 goals and 90 assists in 54 games. These numbers were especially remarkable for a defenseman. NHL scouts were starting to take notice and the New York Rangers chose Leetch as their first-round pick (9th overall) in 1986, making him the first player drafted that year who did not play major junior hockey. Following in the footsteps of his father Jack, Brian enrolled at Boston College in the fall of 1986, and, like his father, would become an All-American defenseman for the Eagles.

=== Playing career ===
After one season at Boston College, he played for the US Olympic team at the 1988 Games in Calgary, making his NHL debut, eight days later, with the New York Rangers on February 29, 1988, versus St. Louis. Leetch tallied his first NHL point in the game with an assist on Kelly Kisio's goal. He finished out the 1987-88 season with 14 points in 17 games. In his first full NHL season (1988-89), Leetch notched 71 points, including a rookie defenseman-record 23 goals, winning the Calder Memorial Trophy as well as being selected to the NHL All-Rookie Team.

As the Rangers slowly developed into a championship-caliber team, Leetch won increasing respect from fans for his quiet demeanor and entertaining, offensive-minded play. In 1992 he became the fifth defenseman in history, and the only American defenseman, to record 100 points in a season and was awarded the Norris Trophy. He recorded 102 points on 22 goals and 80 assists to set a record for the fewest number of goals scored to reach 100 points for a season in NHL history (Joe Thornton matched him in goals for his 114-point season in the 2006–07 season). Leetch was the last NHL defenseman to record 100 points for a season until Erik Karlsson reached the mark in 2022–23. On March 21, 1993, Leetch suffered a broken ankle after slipping on black ice after stepping out of a cab. The injury caused Leetch to miss the rest of the season, prompting a Rangers slump that caused them to miss the playoffs. In 1994 he again matched his career-high of 23 goals in the regular season as the Rangers won the Presidents' Trophy. That year, the Rangers' 54-year championship drought ended with a seven-game Stanley Cup Final victory over the Vancouver Canucks. Leetch became the first non-Canadian to be awarded the Conn Smythe Trophy, and remained the only American to do so until Tim Thomas of the Boston Bruins in 2011. Leetch was the second player in NHL history (after Bobby Orr) to win the Calder Trophy, the Norris Trophy, and the Conn Smythe Trophy in his career. Only Cale Makar has matched this feat since.

Following the Rangers' Cup win in 1994, Leetch remained a fan favorite and team leader, serving as Captain from 1997 to 2000 after the departure of Mark Messier to the Vancouver Canucks (he would return the captaincy to Messier upon Messier's return to the Rangers in 2000).

In 1996, Leetch captained the victorious American team at the inaugural World Cup of Hockey.

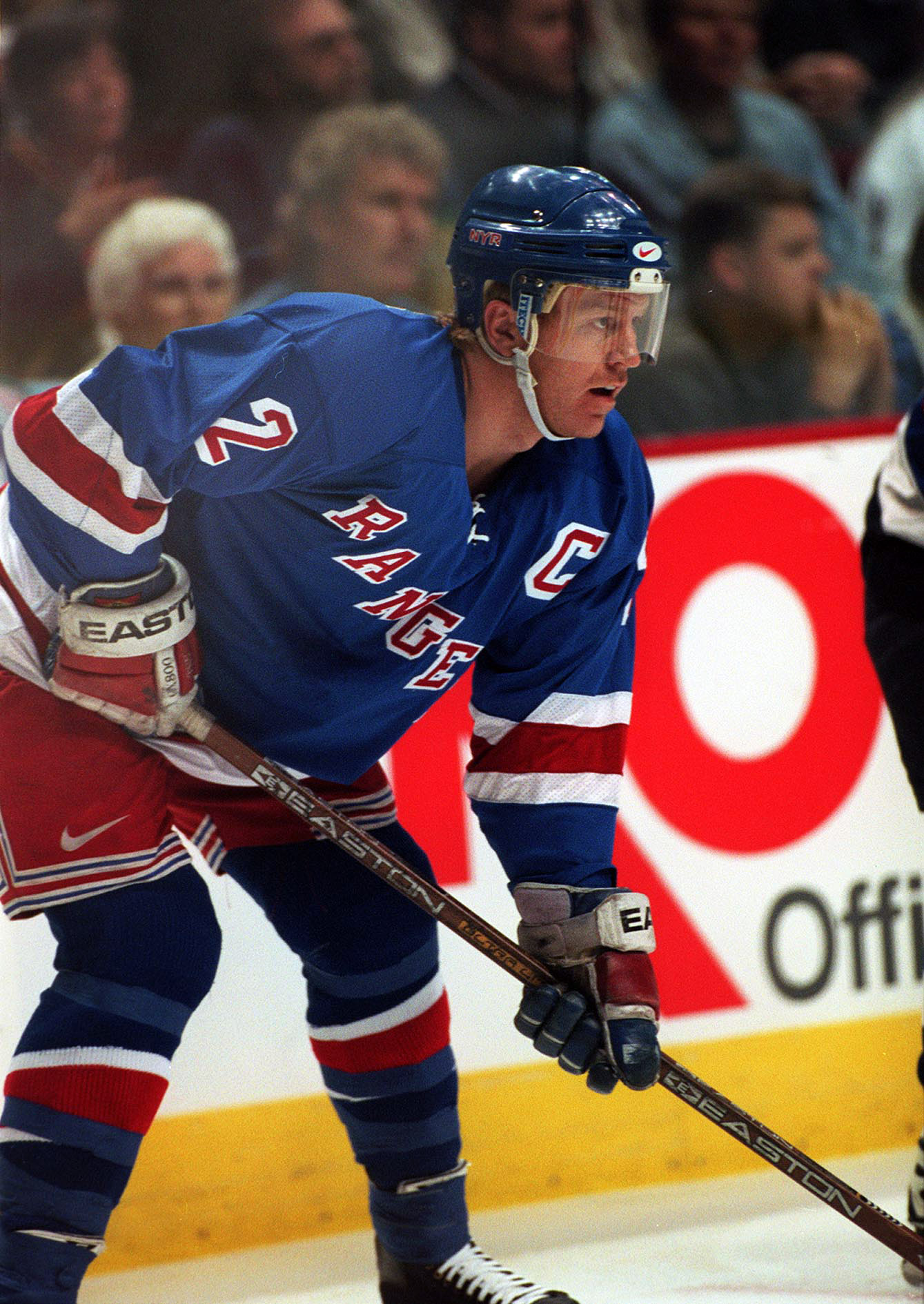
Leetch playing for the New York Rangers in 1997

In 1997, he again won the Norris Trophy and the Rangers made a surprise run to the Eastern Conference Finals, where they were defeated by the Philadelphia Flyers. The next years, however, were marked by disappointing team performances that saw the Rangers miss the playoffs every year.

==== After the Rangers ====
In 1998, Leetch was ranked 71st on The Hockey News' list of the 100 Greatest Hockey Players. On June 30, 2003, as a pending free agent, his rights were traded to the Edmonton Oilers in exchange for Jussi Markkanen and a fourth-round pick in the 2004 draft. The Oilers did not sign him, and he signed a two-year contract to return to the Rangers a month later. After the especially unsuccessful 2004 campaign, the Rangers traded most of their high-priced veterans; Leetch was traded to the Toronto Maple Leafs just prior to the trade deadline for prospects Maxim Kondratiev, Jarkko Immonen, a first-round pick in the 2004 draft, which became Kris Chucko (pick was later traded to the Calgary Flames), and a second-round pick in 2005, which became Michael Sauer.

Leetch was set to play the 2004–05 season with the Maple Leafs; however, due to the 2004–05 lockout, the last year of his contract expired, and he became a free agent. Leetch signed a one-year, $4-million contract with the Boston Bruins before the 2005–06 season. Although the Bruins failed to make the postseason, Leetch scored his 1,000th career point as a member of the team.

Leetch sat out the 2006–07 season, declining numerous offers to play for a team in the season (he had also considered an offer from the Rangers in the summer to play for them) because he did not feel that he could get himself to the level he wanted to play at. On May 24, 2007, Leetch officially announced his retirement, bringing his 18-year NHL career to an end.

On September 18, 2007, Leetch was announced as one of the four recipients of the 2007 Lester Patrick Trophy.

On January 24, 2008, the New York Rangers retired Leetch's number 2 jersey, joining fellow 1994 Stanley Cup Champion teammates Mark Messier and Mike Richter, as well as Rod Gilbert and Eddie Giacomin in the rafters of Madison Square Garden. On that night, his friend, Derek Jeter of the New York Yankees congratulated Leetch for the honor of having his number retired with a video that ended with Jeter saying "So congratulations, from one number 2 to another." Leetch also had the honor of announcing during his ceremony that the New York Rangers would retire his friend and former teammate Adam Graves' number during the 2008–09 season, joining Leetch and the other greats above the Madison Square Gardens ice.

On October 10, 2008, both Leetch and Richter were inducted into the United States Hockey Hall of Fame in Denver. Both of them also played for the silver medal-winning U.S. ice hockey team during the 2002 Winter Olympics.

On June 23, 2009, it was announced that Leetch would be inducted into the Hockey Hall of Fame. He was honored during the November 6–9 induction weekend alongside Steve Yzerman, Brett Hull and Luc Robitaille. The induction made it the third year in a row that a member of the Rangers' 1994 Stanley Cup team has been inducted into the Hockey Hall of Fame, following Messier in 2007 and Glenn Anderson in 2008, who was also inducted along with one of the on-ice officials when the Rangers won the Stanley Cup, Ray Scapinello.

In August 2015 Leetch became manager of player safety in the NHL's Department of Player Safety, leaving after one season.

== Career statistics ==
=== Regular season and playoffs ===
			Regular season					Playoffs
Season	Team	League	GP	G	A	Pts	PIM	GP	G	A	Pts	PIM
1983–84	Cheshire High School	HS	28	52	49	101	24	—	—	—	—	—
1984–85	Avon Old Farms	HS	26	30	46	76	15	—	—	—	—	—
1985–86	Avon Old Farms	HS	28	40	44	84	18	—	—	—	—	—
1986–87	Boston College	HE	37	9	38	47	10	—	—	—	—	—
1987–88	United States	Intl	50	13	61	74	38	—	—	—	—	—
1987–88	New York Rangers	NHL	17	2	12	14	0	—	—	—	—	—
1988–89	New York Rangers	NHL	68	23	48	71	50	4	3	2	5	2
1989–90	New York Rangers	NHL	72	11	45	56	26	—	—	—	—	—
1990–91	New York Rangers	NHL	80	16	72	88	42	6	1	3	4	0
1991–92	New York Rangers	NHL	80	22	80	102	26	13	4	11	15	4
1992–93	New York Rangers	NHL	36	6	30	36	26	—	—	—	—	—
1993–94	New York Rangers	NHL	84	23	56	79	27	23	11	23	34	6
1994–95	New York Rangers	NHL	48	9	32	41	18	10	6	8	14	8
1995–96	New York Rangers	NHL	82	15	70	85	30	11	1	6	7	4
1996–97	New York Rangers	NHL	82	20	58	78	40	15	2	8	10	6
1997–98	New York Rangers	NHL	76	17	33	50	32	—	—	—	—	—
1998–99	New York Rangers	NHL	82	13	42	55	42	—	—	—	—	—
1999–2000	New York Rangers	NHL	50	7	19	26	20	—	—	—	—	—
2000–01	New York Rangers	NHL	82	21	58	79	34	—	—	—	—	—
2001–02	New York Rangers	NHL	82	10	45	55	28	—	—	—	—	—
2002–03	New York Rangers	NHL	51	12	18	30	20	—	—	—	—	—
2003–04	New York Rangers	NHL	57	13	23	36	24	—	—	—	—	—
2003–04	Toronto Maple Leafs	NHL	15	2	13	15	10	13	0	8	8	6
2005–06	Boston Bruins	NHL	61	5	27	32	36	—	—	—	—	—
NHL totals			1,205	247	781	1,028	571	95	28	69	97	36

=== International ===
Year	Team	Event	GP	G	A	Pts	PIM
1985	United States	WJC	7	0	0	0	2
1986	United States	WJC	7	1	4	5	2
1987	United States	WJC	7	1	2	3	6
1987	United States	WC	10	4	5	9	4
1988	United States	OG	6	1	5	6	4
1989	United States	WC	10	3	4	7	4
1991	United States	CC	7	1	3	4	2
1996	United States	WCH	7	0	7	7	4
1998	United States	OG	4	1	1	2	0
2002	United States	OG	6	0	5	5	0
2004	United States	WCH	5	0	1	1	6
Junior totals			21	2	6	8	10
Senior totals			55	10	31	41	24

== Awards and achievements ==
Award	Year
All-Hockey East Rookie Team	1986–87
All-Hockey East First Team	1986–87
AHCA East first-team All-American	1986–87
Hockey East All-Tournament Team	1987

- Olympic Tournament All-Star team (2002)
- James Norris Memorial Trophy (Top NHL Defenseman) (1992, 1997)
- NHL first team All-Star (1992, 1997)
- NHL second team All-Star (1991, 1994, 1996)
- Stanley Cup champion (1994)
- First American-born Conn Smythe Trophy award winner (NHL Playoffs MVP) (1994)
- Calder Memorial Trophy (Top NHL Rookie) (1989)
- NHL All-Rookie Team (1989)
- Hockey East Player of the Year (1987)
- Hockey East Rookie of the Year (1987)
- Hockey East Tournament MVP Award (1987)
- All-Star Selection, Defense, 1987 IIHF World Junior Hockey Championships
- NHL All-Star Game selection (1990, 1991, 1992, 1993, 1994, 1996, 1997, 1998, 2001, 2002, 2003).
- While still playing, was named #71 on the 100 greatest NHL players, as compiled by The Hockey News (and the second-highest player born and trained in the United States, behind Frank Brimsek)
- Inducted into the Hockey Hall of Fame – 2009
- In the 2009 book 100 Ranger Greats, the authors ranked Leetch the Top Ranger of All Time of the 901 New York Rangers who had played during the team's first 82 seasons.
- IIHF Hall of Fame induction in 2023

=== New York Rangers awards ===
- MVP: 1989, 1991, 1997, 1999, 2001, 2003
- Players' Player Award: 2001, 2002, 2003, 2004
- Frank Boucher Award: 2001
- Crumb Bum Award: 1994
- Steven McDonald Extra Effort Award: 1997
- Good Guy Award: 2002
- Ceil Saidel Memorial Award: 2002, 2003
- #2 jersey retired by New York Rangers on January 24, 2008

== Records ==
=== NHL records ===
- Most goals by a rookie defenseman (23, 1988–89 season)

=== New York Rangers regular season records ===
- Most assists, career: 741
- Most goals by a defenseman, career: 240
- Most points by a defenseman, career: 981
- Most assists, single-season: 80 (1991–92)
- Most points by a defenseman, single season: 102 (1991–92)
- Most power-play goals by a defenseman, single-season: 17 (1993–94)

=== New York Rangers playoff records ===
- Most assists, career: 61
- Most points, career: 89
- Most assists, one year: 23, 1993–94
- Most points, one year: 34, 1993–94
- Most goals by a defenseman, career: 28
- Most goals by a defenseman, one year: 11, 1993–94

== See also ==
- List of NHL players with 1,000 points
- List of NHL players with 1,000 games played

== Notes ==
Sporting positions
Preceded by Ulf Dahlén	New York Rangers first-round draft pick 1986	Succeeded by Jayson More
Preceded by Mark Messier	New York Rangers captain 1997–2000	Succeeded by Mark Messier
Awards
Preceded by Scott Harlow	Hockey East Player of the Year; 1986–87	Succeeded by Mike McHugh
Preceded by Al Loring/Scott Young	Hockey East Rookie of the Year; 1986–87	Succeeded by Mario Thyer
Preceded by Peter Marshall	William Flynn Tournament Most Valuable Player; 1987	Succeeded by Bruce Racine
Preceded by Chris Chelios	Winner of the Norris Trophy; 1997	Succeeded by Rob Blake
Preceded by Patrick Roy	Winner of the Conn Smythe Trophy; 1994	Succeeded by Claude Lemieux
Preceded by Ray Bourque	Winner of the Norris Trophy; 1992	Succeeded by Chris Chelios
Preceded by Joe Nieuwendyk	Winner of the Calder Memorial Trophy; 1989	Succeeded by Sergei Makarov
