= Adam Graves =

Canadian ice hockey player (born 1968)

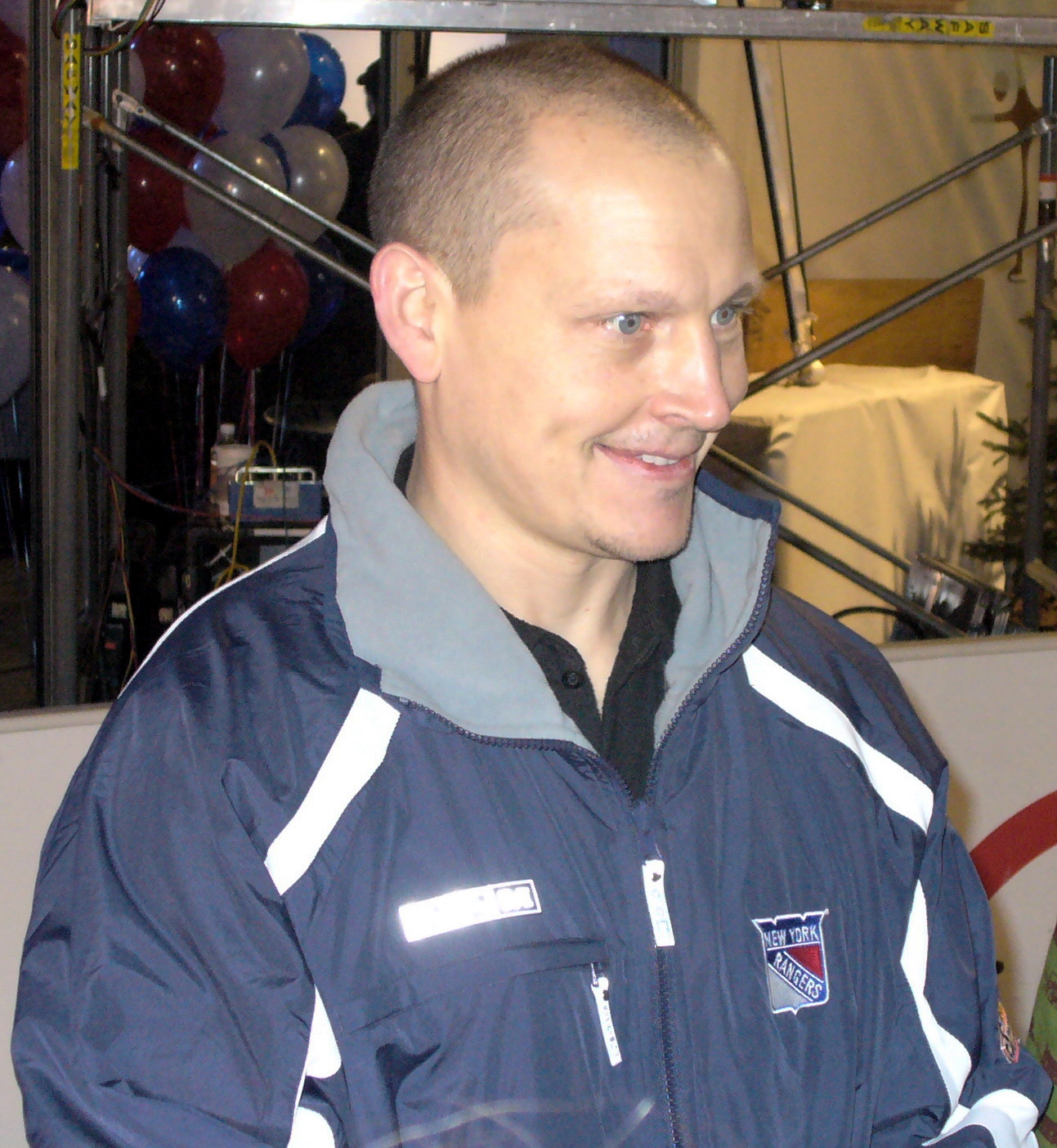
- Graves in 2008
- Born: April 12, 1968 (age 58) Tecumseh, Ontario, Canada
- Height: 6 ft 0 in (183 cm)
- Weight: 205 lb (93 kg; 14 st 9 lb)
- Position: Left wing
- Shot: Left
- Played for: Detroit Red Wings; Edmonton Oilers; New York Rangers; San Jose Sharks
- National team: Canada
- NHL draft: 22nd overall, 1986; Detroit Red Wings
- Playing career: 1987–2003

Adam Scott Graves (born April 12, 1968) is a Canadian former professional hockey player. He played 10 seasons with the New York Rangers of the National Hockey League (NHL). He also played for the Detroit Red Wings, Edmonton Oilers and San Jose Sharks in a career that spanned from 1987 to 2003. He finished his career with 329 goals, 287 assists and 1,224 penalty minutes.

== Playing career ==
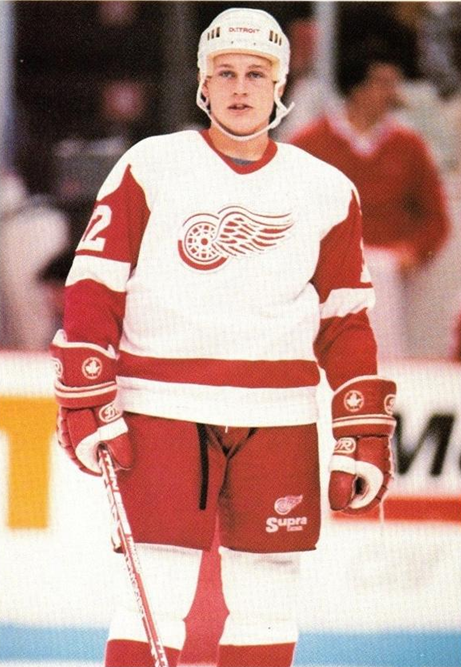
Graves with the Detroit Red Wings in 1988

=== Junior hockey ===
As a youth, Graves played in the 1981 Quebec International Pee-Wee Hockey Tournament with a minor ice hockey team from Wexford, Toronto. Graves started playing Junior B hockey with King City, Ontario, north of his birthplace in Toronto. Graves then joined the Windsor Spitfires of the Ontario Hockey League (OHL) in 1985–86 and averaged over one point per game as a rookie in the OHL. He was drafted 22nd overall by the Detroit Red Wings in the 1986 NHL entry draft. During the 1986–87 season, as captain of the team, he scored 45 goals for the Spitfires, who won the OHL's J. Ross Robertson Cup for the first time ever. In the 1988 Memorial Cup, the Spitfires made it to the Final, where they lost to the Medicine Hat Tigers 7–6.

=== Detroit Red Wings ===
Graves played eight of the first 13 games of the 1987-88 NHL season with the Red Wings before being sent down to the OHL. He played one more game in January for a total of nine NHL games played, where he recorded one assist with eight penalty minutes.

Graves played 54 of the first 63 games of the 1988-89 season, and he recorded his first goal on October 15 against the Toronto Maple Leafs. He spent time with the Adirondack minor league club before returning to play for the Red Wings playoff run. Ultimately, he recorded seven goals and five assists for the regular season with 60 penalty minutes. In the first round playoff against the Chicago Black Hawks, he recorded four penalty minutes as the Red Wings lost in five games.

Graves played in thirteen games for the 1989-90 season for Detroit, recording one assist with 13 penalty minutes before being traded to the Edmonton Oilers.

=== Edmonton Oilers ===
On November 2 of the 1989-90 campaign, Graves was involved in a trade with the Edmonton Oilers. Along with Graves, the Oilers received Petr Klima, Joe Murphy and Jeff Sharples in exchange for Jimmy Carson, Kevin McClelland and Edmonton's fifth-round draft pick in the 1991 NHL entry draft. The trade was lamented at the time in Edmonton, as the high-scoring Klima had run-ins with the law alongside a history of substance abuse, while Sharples was coming off a shoulder injury, and both Murphy and Graves were considered to be underachievers given their high draft status. Red Wings general manager Jim Devellano was reluctant to part with Graves, but felt that obtaining Detroit-area native Carson was worth it. He had nine goals and 12 assists in 63 games played for the Oilers that year. In the 1990 Stanley Cup playoffs, Graves delivered eleven points in 22 games, which included the opening goal in both game one and game two of the Final against the Boston Bruins as the Oilers won the series in five games, making Graves a Stanley Cup champion. Graves had seven goals and 18 assists in 76 games for the 1990-91 season with 127 penalty minutes as the Oilers were eliminated in the Conference Finals.

=== New York Rangers ===
Graves signed an offer sheet for five years and $2.44 million with the New York Rangers, where he would join former Edmonton Oilers teammates Mark Messier and Jeff Beukeboom. Neil Smith, the general manager of the Rangers, was familiar with Graves, having earlier served as the Red Wings' director of scouting. In 1991–92, Graves' first season with the Rangers, he scored 26 goals, helping the team to a 105-point, Presidents' Trophy-winning regular season. Graves finished fifth in the voting for the Frank J. Selke Trophy as the best defensive forward in the league. In game two of the Patrick Division Finals against the Pittsburgh Penguins that year, he fractured the left wrist of superstar Mario Lemieux with a vicious two-handed swing of his stick that resulted in a broken bone in his hand. Graves was assessed only a minor penalty on the play and allowed to take part in game three, in which he scored the first goal of a 6–5 overtime victory. After he was suspended for the remainder of the series, the Penguins rallied to win the next three games and the series on the way to the Stanley Cup championship. In the 1992–93 season, he had 36 goals and 65 points.

During the 1993–94 season, Graves set a new franchise record for most goals in a season, doing so on March 23, 1994 with his 50th and 51st goal of the season during a 5-3 win over the Edmonton Oilers at the Northlands Coliseum that broke a tie with Vic Hadfield's record of 50 in 1972; Graves was only the second Ranger with 50 goals in a season. He finished with 52 goals, a career high; the franchise record stood until Jaromír Jágr scored 54 goals in the 2005–06 season. In the 1994 Stanley Cup playoffs, Graves and the Rangers advanced all the way to the Stanley Cup Final looking for their first championship since 1940. In game seven against the Vancouver Canucks, Graves scored on a powerplay goal to give the Rangers a 2–0 lead in the first period before lending an assist on Mark Messier's goal in the second period to make it 3–1 in a game the Rangers narrowly won 3–2 to win the Cup. In 23 playoff games, Graves scored ten goals and recorded seven assists and teammate Brian Leetch later called him the "foundation" and "heart and soul" of the championship team. Graves was awarded a roster spot on the NHL's second All-Star team at the position of left wing and was the recipient of the King Clancy Memorial Trophy in recognition of his continuing work with charitable causes. Graves is one of the seven alumni of the Oilers dynasty to win the Stanley Cup with the 1993–94 New York Rangers, along with Jeff Beukeboom, Glenn Anderson, Kevin Lowe, Craig MacTavish, Mark Messier and Esa Tikkanen.

In the lockout-shortened 1994-95 season, he played in 47 of 48 possible games, recording 17 goals with 14 assists with 51 penalty minutes. The next five seasons saw Graves record two 30-goal seasons and three 20-goal seasons. The 2000-01 season saw him play all 82 games while not being "mentally and physically prepared" to play the way he wanted that saw him score just ten goals with 16 assists for 77 penalty minutes; the Rangers shopped around in trying to trade him at the deadline and talks were rumbling in June as Graves was award the Bill Masterton Trophy for his sportsmanship.

=== San Jose Sharks ===
Before the 2001-02 season, Graves was traded to the San Jose Sharks in exchange for Mikael Samuelsson and Christian Gosselin. Graves played with the Sharks organization for two years, totaling 49 total points. He scored his final goal on March 13, 2003 against the Mighty Ducks of Anaheim and recorded his final point on March 29 against the Dallas Stars before playing his final game on April 6.

After the 2002-03 season ended, the Sharks reneged on an offer to bring Graves back for the 2003-04 season. He spent the fall training in the hope that a team that would make a suitable offer, but no teams were interested. A New York Post article detailing Graves and his appearance at a ceremony honoring Mike Richter in February 2004 stated that Graves was effectively retired. He retired in April 2004 and was soon hired by the Rangers as a special assistant in prospect development.

== Personal life ==
Graves grew up in Toronto (North York) and Caledon, Ontario with his parents Robert Henry (a police officer stationed in Cabbagetown, Toronto, died 2000) and Lynda Sophia (Surgeoner) Graves (died 2013). Graves has two older sisters, Richenda and Lynette, as well as a younger adopted brother, Mark. The Graves family also took in as many as 40 foster children. He and his wife, Violet, are the parents of four children. They reside in Oakville, Ontario.

== Awards and honors ==
During the 1993–94 season, Graves was awarded with the King Clancy Memorial Trophy, which is given annually to the NHL player who best exemplifies leadership qualities or has made a noteworthy humanitarian contribution to his community; he served as Celebrity Chairman of New York's Family Dynamic program, a charity aimed at assisting abused children. At the conclusion of the 1999–2000 season, Graves was awarded the NHL Foundation Player Award, which was given annually to the player who “applies the core values of hockey – commitment, perseverance and teamwork – to enrich the lives of people in his community.” In five seasons (1991–92, 1992–93, 1993–94, 1998–99 and 1999–2000) Graves received the Steven McDonald Extra Effort Award, given annually to the Rangers player who goes "above and beyond the call of duty" (the award is named in honor of New York City Detective Steven McDonald, who was shot and injured in the line of duty).

He was awarded the Bill Masterton Memorial Trophy in the 2000–01 season.

On February 3, 2009, the New York Rangers retired Graves' No. 9 jersey before a game against the Atlanta Thrashers, joining fellow 1994 Stanley Cup champion teammates Brian Leetch, Mark Messier and Mike Richter, as well as Rod Gilbert and Ed Giacomin in the rafters of Madison Square Garden. #9 was also retired for Graves by his junior hockey team, the Windsor Spitfires. In the 2009 book 100 Ranger Greats, the authors ranked Graves at No. 13 all-time of the 901 New York Rangers who had played during the team's first 82 seasons.

== Awards and achievements ==
- Member of two Stanley Cup winning teams: 1990 with the Edmonton Oilers and 1994 with the New York Rangers
- Selected to one NHL All-Star Game: 1994
- Named to the second All-Star team: 1993–94
- Winner of the 1994 King Clancy Memorial Trophy
- Winner of the 2001 Bill Masterton Memorial Trophy
- New York Rangers retired his jersey number 9 on February 3, 2009

== Career statistics ==
=== Regular season and playoffs ===
			Regular season					Playoffs
Season	Team	League	GP	G	A	Pts	PIM	GP	G	A	Pts	PIM
1984–85	King City Dukes	MetJHL	25	23	33	56	29	—	—	—	—	—
1985–86	Windsor Spitfires	OHL	62	27	37	64	35	16	5	11	16	10
1986–87	Windsor Spitfires	OHL	66	45	55	100	70	14	9	8	17	32
1986–87	Adirondack Red Wings	AHL	—	—	—	—	—	5	0	1	1	0
1987–88	Detroit Red Wings	NHL	9	0	1	1	8	—	—	—	—	—
1987–88	Windsor Spitfires	OHL	37	28	32	60	107	12	14	18	32	16
1987–88	Windsor Spitfires	M-Cup	—	—	—	—	—	4	2	3	5	8
1988–89	Adirondack Red Wings	AHL	14	10	11	21	28	14	11	7	18	17
1988–89	Detroit Red Wings	NHL	56	7	5	12	60	5	0	0	0	4
1989–90	Detroit Red Wings	NHL	13	0	1	1	13	—	—	—	—	—
1989–90	Edmonton Oilers	NHL	63	9	12	21	123	22	5	6	11	17
1990–91	Edmonton Oilers	NHL	76	7	18	25	127	18	2	4	6	22
1991–92	New York Rangers	NHL	80	26	33	59	139	10	5	3	8	22
1992–93	New York Rangers	NHL	84	36	29	65	148	—	—	—	—	—
1993–94	New York Rangers	NHL	84	52	27	79	127	23	10	7	17	24
1994–95	New York Rangers	NHL	47	17	14	31	51	10	4	4	8	8
1995–96	New York Rangers	NHL	82	22	36	58	100	10	7	1	8	4
1996–97	New York Rangers	NHL	82	33	28	61	66	15	2	1	3	12
1997–98	New York Rangers	NHL	72	23	12	35	41	—	—	—	—	—
1998–99	New York Rangers	NHL	82	38	15	53	47	—	—	—	—	—
1999–00	New York Rangers	NHL	77	23	17	40	14	—	—	—	—	—
2000–01	New York Rangers	NHL	82	10	16	26	77	—	—	—	—	—
2001–02	San Jose Sharks	NHL	81	17	14	31	51	12	3	1	4	6
2002–03	San Jose Sharks	NHL	82	9	9	18	32	—	—	—	—	—
NHL totals			1,152	329	287	616	1,224	125	38	27	65	119

=== International ===
Year	Team	Event	GP	G	A	Pts	PIM
1988	Canada	WJC	7	5	0	5	4
1993	Canada	WC	8	3	3	6	8
1996	Canada	WCH	7	0	1	1	2
1999	Canada	WC	10	5	2	7	8
Junior totals			7	5	0	5	4
Senior totals			25	8	6	14	18

== Transactions ==
- November 2, 1989: Traded by the Detroit Red Wings, along with Petr Klima, Joe Murphy and Jeff Sharples to the Edmonton Oilers in exchange for Jimmy Carson, Kevin McClelland and Edmonton's 1991 5th-round draft choice.
- September 3, 1991: Signed as a free agent by the New York Rangers.
- 2001: Traded by the New York Rangers with future considerations to the San Jose Sharks for Mikael Samuelsson.

== See also ==
- List of NHL players with 50-goal seasons
- List of NHL players with 1,000 games played
- List of NHL players who have signed offer sheets

Preceded by Dave Poulin	Winner of the King Clancy Memorial Trophy; 1994	Succeeded by Joe Nieuwendyk
Preceded by Ken Daneyko	Bill Masterton Trophy winner 2001	Succeeded by Saku Koivu
Preceded by Jan Erixon	Steven McDonald Extra Effort Award winner 1991–92 NHL season through 1993–94 NHL season	Succeeded by Mark Messier
Preceded by Wayne Gretzky	Steven McDonald Extra Effort Award winner 1998–99 NHL season through 1999–2000 NHL season	Succeeded by Sandy McCarthy
