= Jan Erixon =

Swedish ice hockey player

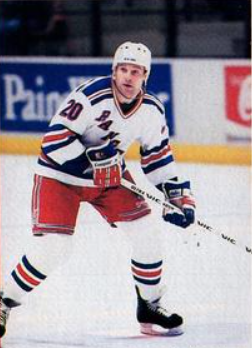
- Born: July 8, 1962 (age 64) Skellefteå, Sweden
- Height: 6 ft 0 in (183 cm)
- Weight: 196 lb (89 kg; 14 st 0 lb)
- Position: Left wing
- Shot: Left
- Played for: Skellefteå AIK; New York Rangers
- National team: Sweden
- NHL draft: 30th overall, 1981; New York Rangers
- Playing career: 1980–1994

Jan Erixon (born July 8, 1962) is a Swedish former professional ice hockey player. Erixon was the thirtieth overall pick in the second round by the New York Rangers in the 1981 NHL entry draft.

== Playing career ==
Erixon began his NHL career with the Rangers in the 1983–84 season, and played with them through the 1992–93 season. During his time with the Rangers, his only NHL team, he earned the nickname "the Shadow" because of his work as a defensive forward, often called on to neutralize opposing teams' best players.

His son Tim is also a professional ice hockey player and played in the NHL between 2011 and 2015.

== Career statistics ==
=== Regular season and playoffs ===
| | | | Regular season | | | | | Playoffs |
| Season | Team | League | GP | G | A | Pts | PIM | GP | G | A | Pts | PIM |
|---|---|---|---|---|---|---|---|---|---|---|---|---|
| 1980–81 | Skellefteå AIK | SEL | 32 | 6 | 6 | 12 | 4 | 3 | 1 | 0 | 1 | 0 |
| 1981–82 | Skellefteå AIK | SEL | 30 | 7 | 7 | 14 | 26 | — | — | — | — | — |
| 1982–83 | Skellefteå AIK | SEL | 36 | 10 | 19 | 29 | 32 | — | — | — | — | — |
| 1983–84 | New York Rangers | NHL | 75 | 5 | 25 | 30 | 16 | 5 | 2 | 0 | 2 | 4 |
| 1984–85 | New York Rangers | NHL | 66 | 7 | 22 | 29 | 33 | 2 | 0 | 0 | 0 | 2 |
| 1985–86 | New York Rangers | NHL | 31 | 2 | 17 | 19 | 4 | 12 | 0 | 1 | 1 | 4 |
| 1986–87 | New York Rangers | NHL | 68 | 8 | 18 | 26 | 24 | 6 | 1 | 0 | 1 | 0 |
| 1987–88 | New York Rangers | NHL | 70 | 7 | 19 | 26 | 33 | — | — | — | — | — |
| 1988–89 | New York Rangers | NHL | 44 | 4 | 11 | 15 | 27 | 4 | 0 | 1 | 1 | 2 |
| 1989–90 | New York Rangers | NHL | 58 | 4 | 9 | 13 | 8 | 10 | 1 | 0 | 1 | 2 |
| 1990–91 | New York Rangers | NHL | 53 | 7 | 18 | 25 | 8 | 6 | 1 | 2 | 3 | 0 |
| 1991–92 | New York Rangers | NHL | 46 | 8 | 9 | 17 | 4 | 13 | 2 | 3 | 5 | 2 |
| 1992–93 | New York Rangers | NHL | 45 | 5 | 11 | 16 | 10 | — | — | — | — | — |
| 1993–94 | Skellefteå AIK | SWE II | 13 | 2 | 10 | 12 | 10 | 7 | 2 | 3 | 5 | 20 |
| SEL totals | | | 98 | 23 | 32 | 55 | 62 | 3 | 1 | 0 | 1 | 0 |
| NHL totals | | | 556 | 57 | 159 | 216 | 167 | 58 | 7 | 7 | 14 | 16 |

Medal record

Representing Sweden

Ice hockey

World Junior Championships
| Gold medal – first place | 1981 West Germany | |

=== International ===
| Year | Team | Event | GP | G | A | Pts | PIM |
|---|---|---|---|---|---|---|---|
| 1981 | Sweden | WJC | 5 | 1 | 6 | 7 | 2 |
| 1981 | Sweden | CC | 2 | 0 | 0 | 0 | 0 |
| 1982 | Sweden | WC | 10 | 1 | 4 | 5 | 4 |
| 1983 | Sweden | WC | 7 | 4 | 0 | 4 | 8 |
| Senior totals | | | 19 | 5 | 4 | 9 | 12 |

== Achievements and awards ==
- In the 2009 book 100 Ranger Greats, was ranked No. 81 all-time of the 901 New York Rangers who had played during the team's first 82 seasons
- Two time winner of the Steven McDonald Extra Effort Award for his services "above and beyond the call of duty".

== See also ==
- List of NHL players who spent their entire career with one franchise

| Preceded by John Vanbiesbrouck; Kelly Kisio | Steven McDonald Extra Effort Award winner 1991 | Succeeded by Adam Graves |
| Preceded by None | Steven McDonald Extra Effort Award winner 1988 | Succeeded by Tony Granato |
