= John Vanbiesbrouck =

American ice hockey player (born 1963)

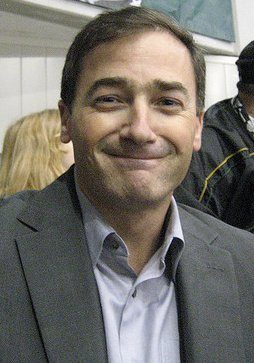
- Vanbiesbrouck in 2007
- Born: September 4, 1963 (age 63) Detroit, Michigan, U.S.
- Height: 5 ft 8 in (173 cm)
- Weight: 175 lb (79 kg; 12 st 7 lb)
- Position: Goaltender
- Caught: Left
- Played for: New York Rangers; Florida Panthers; Philadelphia Flyers; New York Islanders; New Jersey Devils
- National team: United States
- NHL draft: 72nd overall, 1981; New York Rangers
- Playing career: 1981–2002

John Vanbiesbrouck (born September 4, 1963), nicknamed "the Beezer" and "JVB", is an American professional ice hockey executive and former player. As a goaltender, he was inducted into the United States Hockey Hall of Fame in 2007. Vanbiesbrouck played in the National Hockey League (NHL) from 1981 to 2002 for the New York Rangers, Florida Panthers, Philadelphia Flyers, New York Islanders, and New Jersey Devils. He began his career playing major junior hockey for the Sault Ste. Marie Greyhounds of the Ontario Hockey League (OHL). Following a successful season with the Greyhounds, he was drafted by the New York Rangers in the fourth round, 72nd overall, in the 1981 NHL Draft. After his junior career ended, he played for the Rangers minor league affiliate, the Tulsa Oilers of the Central Hockey League. Despite the team's near collapses due to financial concerns, Vanbiesbrouck led the Oilers to a league championship and shared the league's MVP honors.

Vanbiesbrouck began playing full-time with the Rangers in the 1984–85 season. He won the Vezina Trophy as the league's top goaltender and was named a First Team NHL All-Star the following season. After playing in parts of 11 seasons with the Rangers, he was selected in the 1993 NHL Expansion Draft by the Florida Panthers. In Florida, Vanbiesbrouck was a three-time All-Star and led the Panthers to their first Stanley Cup Final appearance, in 1996. While in Florida, he recorded his 300th career victory, becoming the 15th goaltender and only the second American goalie in NHL history to do so. During his career, Vanbiesbrouck compiled a record of 374 wins, 346 losses, 119 ties and 40 shutouts, making him, at the time, the winningest American-born goaltender, and also at the time, tying Frank Brimsek for most career shutouts by an American-born goaltender. Both records have since been broken by Ryan Miller and Jonathan Quick.

Internationally, Vanbiesbrouck has represented the United States on several occasions. He played in the 1982 World Junior Ice Hockey Championships as well as four IIHF World Championships. He was named to the second All-Star team at the 1985 World Ice Hockey Championships. He also played in two Canada Cup tournaments, registering the lowest goals against average (GAA) in 1987 and was a back-up goaltender during the Americans' second-place finish in 1991. He represented Team USA for the final time in 1998, serving as the back-up on the Olympic ice hockey team.

Following his playing career, he took over as the head coach and general manager of the Sault Ste. Marie Greyhounds. However, after using a racial slur referencing team captain Trevor Daley, he resigned. Vanbiesbrouck worked as a broadcaster and in hockey-related businesses. In 2013, Vanbiesbrouck was named the general manager of the Muskegon Lumberjacks in the Tier I junior United States Hockey League (USHL). In 2018, he was hired by USA Hockey as the assistant executive director of hockey operations and would be involved with selecting players for the US national teams. In late 2021 Vanbiesbrouck was named general manager of the U.S. Olympics Men's hockey team.

== Early life ==
Vanbiesbrouck was born in Detroit, Michigan, as the youngest of three boys born to a Belgian immigrant bricklayer, Robert Vanbiesbrouck, and an Italian immigrant, Sara. He grew up with two older brothers; the oldest, Frank, who was also a goaltender in youth hockey, inspired Vanbiesbrouck to play goaltender. John later noted that he learned more about goaltending just from watching Frank than any coaching could, adding that no one ever helped him more to become the player he was.

== Playing career ==
=== Junior and minor leagues ===
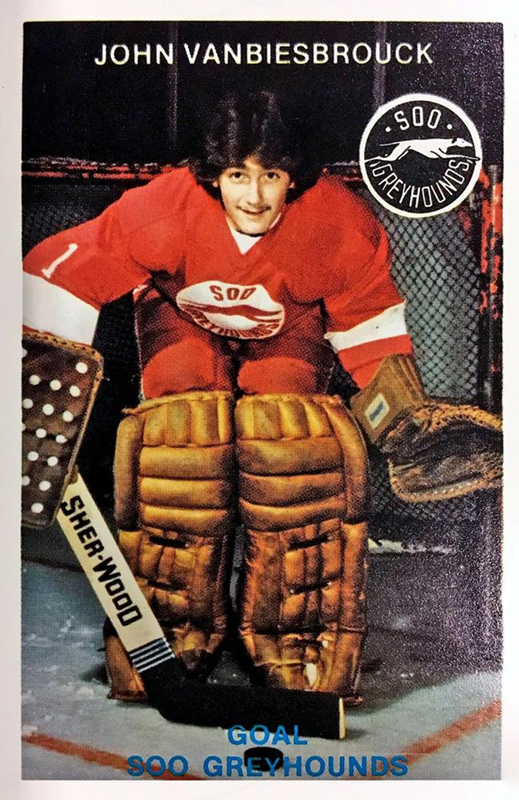
Vanbiesbrouck with the Sault Ste. Marie Greyhounds in 1981

While playing midget level hockey, Vanbiesbrouck joined the Little Caesars hockey club, a minor ice hockey team in Detroit. During a tournament in Toronto, Vanbiesbrouck lost his jersey and was forced to wear a teammate's uniform. He played well in the tournament with junior scouts in attendance. Since Vanbiesbrouck wore another player's jersey, he went undrafted in the midget draft, while the player whose jersey he wore was drafted in the fourth round. After being unclaimed in the draft, Vanbiesbrouck was offered a try-out with the Sault Ste. Marie Greyhounds, members of the Ontario Major Junior Hockey League (OMJHL), which later became the Ontario Hockey League (OHL). At the try-out, he made the team over several other players, and became the starting goaltender for the Greyhounds. Vanbiesbrouck played in 56 games and compiled a 31–16–1 record during his first season in Sault Ste. Marie. Following the 1980–81 season, he was drafted in the fourth round, 72nd overall, of the NHL Draft by the New York Rangers.

On December 5, 1981, just months after being drafted, Vanbiesbrouck made his professional debut with the Rangers as an emergency call-up. He helped defeat the Colorado Rockies 2–1. Despite only allowing one goal and earning his first NHL win, the Rangers decided to return him to Sault Ste. Marie, a move intended to aid his development. He finished the year with a 12–12–2 record for the Greyhounds and made his first international appearance, representing the United States at the 1982 World Junior Championships. He played one more season for the Greyhounds, playing 62 games winning 39 of them and being named to OHL second All-Star team.

Following his career with the Greyhounds, Vanbiesbrouck moved on to the minor leagues, joining the Central Hockey League's (CHL) Tulsa Oilers. During the 1983–84 season, his first with the Oilers, the ownership group was unable to sustain the team. They went bankrupt, were taken over by the league, and forced to play their remaining games on the road. After losing their home rink the team was housed in Denver, Colorado where they shared a practice facility with the University of Denver and fellow CHL team the Colorado Flames. The lack of ice time often forced the Oilers to practice in a shopping mall where they were not allowed to shoot pucks. For extra practice, Vanbiesbrouck had tennis balls hit at him in the parking lot. Despite all the adversity, the Oilers won the Adams Cup as league champions. Meanwhile, Vanbiesbrouck won the Terry Sawchuk Award, with back-up Ron Scott, for fewest goals against in the league and shared CHL MVP honors with Bruce Affleck by winning the Tommy Ivan Trophy.

=== New York Rangers ===
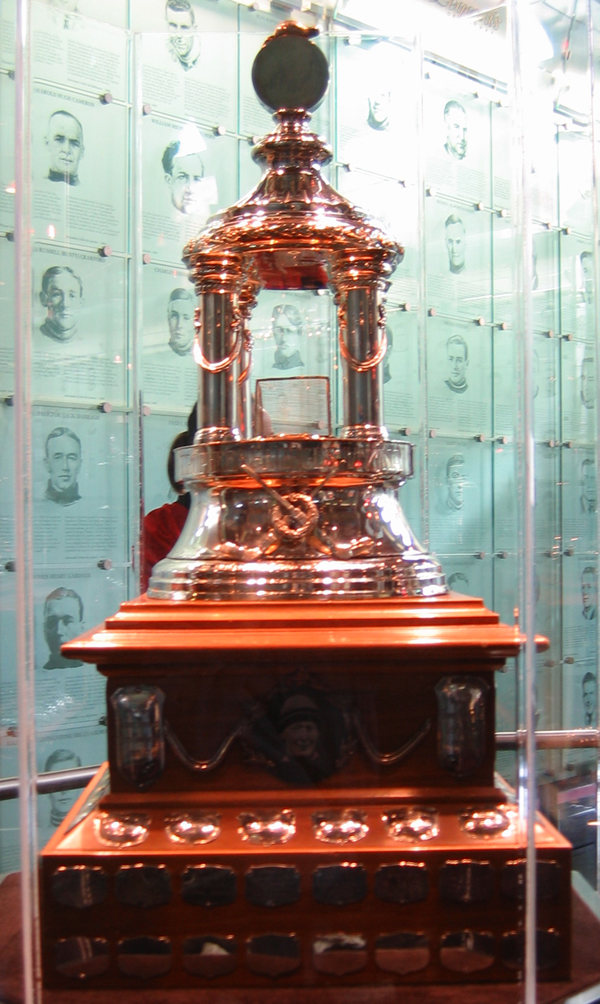
The Vezina Trophy, which Vanbiesbrouck won in 1986

Vanbiesbrouck made the Rangers full-time in the 1984–85 season, playing in 42 games and posted a 4.20 goals against average (GAA). The following year, Vanbiesbrouck played in 61 games, winning a career high 31. The 31 victories accounted for all but five of the Rangers' regular season total. His success continued over to the post-season, where he led the Rangers to an upset over the Philadelphia Flyers in the opening round. He then followed it by defeating a Washington Capitals team that registered 107 points in the regular season. The Rangers lost in the Conference Finals to the eventual Stanley Cup champion Montreal Canadiens. In the off-season, Vanbiesbrouck was named a First Team NHL All-Star, won the Vezina Trophy as the league's top goaltender, and signed a new three-year contract with the Rangers. He was unable to repeat his success in the next season, with 18 wins and 20 losses in 50 games.

Prior to the 1987–88 season, Vanbiesbrouck was hit by a puck under his mask in practice, which caused a non-displaced fracture of his lower jaw and a broken tooth. Fortunately for him, the injury did not require his jaw to be wired shut, and he was able to return to practice the next day. He showed no ill effects from the injury, playing in 56 games, winning 27. On June 13, 1988 Vanbiesbrouck suffered nerve damage to his left wrist after a glass coffee table he was sitting on collapsed and broken glass lacerated his ulnar nerve and three tendons. He was sitting on the table assembling video equipment in anticipation of the birth of his first child. The glass broke beneath him, and as he braced for the fall, his wrist was cut by the glass. Vanbiesbrouck required five hours of microsurgery to remove glass from his wrist and repair the nerve and tendon damage. He was initially expected to miss four-to-six months, but he recovered in time to attend the Rangers pre-season training camp just three months later. Again he played in 56 games, and increased his win total to 28.

Vanbiesbrouck began the 1989–90 season as the Rangers' starting goaltender, but after the Rangers struggled in early January, he began to share the duties with the recently called-up Mike Richter. During the playoffs, head coach Roger Neilson employed a rotation system between the two goaltenders. The Rangers won their first round match-up against the New York Islanders, but lost to the Washington Capitals in the second round. For his part, Vanbiesbrouck posted a 2–3 record with a 3.02 GAA and a .902 save percentage.

The following season, the two goaltenders formed the best duo in the NHL. The duo remained together even after Vanbiesbrouck had a chance to leave via free agency in 1992. A new collective bargaining agreement established him as a group 2 free agent, allowing the Rangers to match any offer from another team or to claim draft choices as compensation if he were to sign with another team. After not receiving much interest from other clubs, Vanbiesbrouck re-signed with the Rangers, signing a two-year deal with an option for the third averaging $1 million per season. At the end of the 1992–93 season, the decision was made to trade Vanbiesbrouck. With the upcoming expansion draft, the Rangers would only be able to protect one goaltender. Faced with the prospect of losing one of their two goaltenders, the Rangers decided to protect Richter and traded the "equally talented" but older Vanbiesbrouck to the Vancouver Canucks in exchange for future considerations (ultimately, Doug Lidster).

=== Florida Panthers ===
Vancouver made the trade not with the intention of keeping Vanbiesbrouck, but rather in an attempt to keep other players on their roster from being drafted. Rules of the 1993 NHL Expansion Draft allowed teams to protect one goaltender, nine forwards and five defensemen. Additional rules stated that teams could only lose one goaltender in the draft and prevented teams from losing both a defenseman and a goaltender. Prior to the draft, Florida Panthers general manager Bobby Clarke won a coin-toss giving them the first pick in the draft. Thus, with their first selection, the Panthers picked Vanbiesbrouck to be the number one goaltender for their team. Upon his arrival in Florida, Vanbiesbrouck went on a "mall tour" to help elevate the visibility of the franchise and made an informative video explaining ice hockey terms for Blockbuster, then owners of the franchise. In January 1994, he made his return to Madison Square Garden. In his first game back to his former home venue, Vanbiesbrouck made 51 saves, ultimately losing the game 3–2. During the season, he was also named to the All-Star game as the Panthers' sole representative. In the game, Vanbiesbrouck played the third period, made six saves and was credited with the win. At the completion of his first season in Florida, he played in 57 games posting a 21–25–11 record, registering a 2.53 GAA, and his career best save percentage of .924 ranked him second in the league. Vanbiesbrouck was named a Second Team NHL All-Star and was shortlisted for the Hart and Vezina Trophies. His 21 wins tied the Minnesota North Stars' Cesare Maniago's record for the most by an expansion goaltender. The record was later passed by Ron Tugnutt during the Columbus Blue Jackets' inaugural season. The Panthers finished the season with 83 points, one point behind the New York Islanders, for the eighth and final playoff spot in the Eastern Conference. The following season was shortened due to the 1994–95 NHL lockout. Consequently, Vanbiesbrouck played in just 37 games registering a 14–15–4 record. He lowered his GAA from the previous year to 2.47 and increased his shutout total from one to four. However, his save percentage dropped to .914. The Panthers again fell a point short of making the playoffs.

In the 1995–96 season, Vanbiesbrouck was named to the All-Star Game. In the game, he played the second period and gave up three goals on seven shots. The Panthers were in playoff position for more than half of the season, but faltered late in the season and were close to falling out of the playoff race. Late in the season, Vanbiesbrouck shutout the New Jersey Devils putting Florida into the playoffs. At the end of the regular season, he played in 57 games posting a 21–25–11 with two shutouts. His games played ranked him tenth in the league while his GAA of 2.68 was ninth. In the first round, Florida defeated the Boston Bruins in five games. Their second round match-up was against the heavily favored Philadelphia Flyers. Vanbiesbrouck posted a shutout in the first game of the series, the third post-season shutout of his career and the first in Panthers playoff history. During the series, Vanbiesbrouck held the Flyers scoreless for 116:46 straight minutes as Florida upset Philadelphia, winning four games to two. In the Conference Finals, the Panthers were again huge underdogs to the Pittsburgh Penguins, a team that featured the league's two top scorers in Mario Lemieux and Jaromír Jágr. The Penguins took a 3–2 series lead, but the Panthers won Game 6, 4–3, to force Game 7. In Game 7, Vanbiesbrouck made 39 saves in a 3–1 Panthers victory, winning the Eastern Conference and putting them in the Stanley Cup Final. The Panthers fell behind the Colorado Avalanche 3–0 in the series. Game 4 was considered one of the classic games in finals' history. The game was a 0–0 tie entering the third overtime period. Early in the period, a long shot from Colorado's Uwe Krupp eluded Vanbiesbrouck, giving the Avalanche a 1–0 win and the Stanley Cup. Vanbiesbrouck made 55 saves in the loss and even though his team was swept in the finals, he still finished third in voting for the Conn Smythe Trophy as playoff MVP.

During the 1996–97 season, Vanbiesbrouck was elected by the fans to the All-Star Game as the starting goaltender. Vanbiesbrouck' 200,457 votes led the Eastern Conference. By season's end, Vanbiesbrouck finished in the top ten in the NHL for save percentage (6), GAA (5) and tied for 11 in wins (27). The Panthers finished fourth in the Eastern Conference and faced the Rangers in the first round of the Stanley Cup playoffs. Vanbiesbrouck made 34 saves in Game 1, shutting-out the Rangers 3–0. It was the only game the Panthers won as the Rangers defeated them 4–1 in the series. The following season, Vanbiesbrouck reached a personal milestone. On December 27, 1997, the Panthers defeated the New York Islanders 6–2 at Nassau Coliseum. The win marked the 300th of his career, making him the 15th goaltender, and second American, in NHL history to reach the mark. Despite his personal milestone, Vanbiesbrouck suffered through his worst statistical season with the Panthers. The team fared no better as they finished the season in 12th place in the Eastern Conference and out of the playoffs.

=== Post-Panthers career ===
During the off-season, Vanbiesbrouck signed a two-year, $7.25 million contract, with an option for a third year, with the Philadelphia Flyers. His first season with Philadelphia was successful, as he posted a career best 2.18 GAA, notching six shutouts, playing in a career high 62 games and registering a 27–18–15 record. However, he struggled in the playoffs. Despite posting good individual numbers (.938 save pct and 1.46 GAA), Vanbiesbrouck let in goals that many Flyers fans perceived to be "soft" that cost the Flyers games. However, what ostensibly cost the Flyers the games was their inability to score timely goals for their goaltender—they scored just 11 goals in 6 games while Vanbiesbrouck allowed just nine goals in six games. Philadelphia was eliminated in the first round by the Toronto Maple Leafs in six games. He continued to be "shaky" at the beginning of the 1999–2000 season. As a result, rookie Brian Boucher began playing more. Vanbiesbrouck reached another milestone during the season, becoming the 8th goaltender in NHL history to play in 800 games. Vanbiesbrouck played 50 games during the season, registering a 25–15–9 record, but in the playoffs, the Flyers opted for Boucher.

During the 2000 NHL entry draft, Philadelphia traded Vanbiesbrouck to the New York Islanders in exchange for a fourth-round draft pick. The Islanders made the trade with the intention of having Vanbiesbrouck mentor first overall draft pick Rick DiPietro. He played in 44 games for the Islanders winning 10 of them and recording a shutout. On the eve of the NHL trade deadline, the Islanders traded Vanbiesbrouck to the New Jersey Devils for Chris Terreri and a ninth-round pick. New Jersey made the deal with the intent to give starting goaltender Martin Brodeur some rest prior to the playoffs. With Terreri struggling, they felt it best to bring in someone who had played regularly throughout the year. Vanbiesbrouck played in four games for the Devils, winning them all, and recorded his 40th career shutout. The shutout tied him with Frank Brimsek for the most shutouts by an American-born goaltender in NHL history. Vanbiesbrouck did not play during the playoffs, but the Devils advanced to the Stanley Cup Final, where they played the Colorado Avalanche and lost in seven games. Vanbiesbrouck retired immediately after Game 7 on June 10, 2001. He stated that "it's time" and he wanted to leave the game healthy. He was retired for only eight months before he agreed to terms with the Devils to come out of retirement. He posted a 2–3–0 record as the Devils back up, finishing his career with 374 wins. His win total was the most by an American-born goaltender in NHL history at the time. He again did not play in the playoffs as the Devils were eliminated in the first round by the eventual Eastern Conference champion Carolina Hurricanes. Vanbiesbrouck retired for the second and final time on May 24, 2002.

Following his playing career, Vanbiesbrouck earned several accolades. The Sault Ste. Marie Greyhounds retired his number (1). NHL named him the best player to wear jersey number 34, and on October 12, 2007, Vanbiesbrouck was inducted into the United States Hockey Hall of Fame. He is 16th in NHL history in wins. However, he is also sixth all-time in losses.

== International play ==
Medal record

Representing United States

Men's Ice hockey

Canada Cup
Silver medal – second place	1991 Canada	

Vanbiesbrouck made his international debut in 1982 representing the United States at the World Junior Championship. In five games he posted a 1–3–0 record with a 5.70 GAA, as the Americans finished in sixth place. The next year he again participated in the World Junior Championship. He appeared in five games and lowered his GAA to 3.64, helping the American team improve to fifth place.

In 1985 he played for Team USA at the IIHF World Championships. Vanbiesbrouck posted a 6–3–0 record, defeating three of three top ranked teams in the world (Canada, Czech Republic and Sweden). He later noted that those three victories gave him the confidence to be successful at the NHL level. The Americans were the second seed following the preliminary round. However, they failed to win a single game in the championship round and finished the tournament in fourth place. Individually Vanbiesbrouck was named to the second All-Star team. Two years later, he played in his second World Championship. He was unable to duplicate his prior success posting a 2–5–0 record, as Team USA finished in seventh place one position away from being relegated to Division I. During 1987 Vanbiesbrouck also participated in the Canada Cup, registering a 2–2–0 record with a 2.25 GAA. He registered the lowest GAA in the tournament, but the United States finished in fifth place. He played in two more World Championships in 1989 and 1991 going 1–2–1 and 3–4–2 respectively, as the US improved to sixth place in 1989 and finished just short of winning a medal in 1991 placing fourth. Vanbiesbrouck was named to the Canada Cup team in 1991, but spent the tournament as Mike Richter's back-up. He played only one game in the tournament, defeating Finland 4–3. The United States finished the Canada Cup in second place losing the best of three championship to Canada 2–0. He was named to the 1996 World Cup of Hockey team but missed the Americans' victory due to a small cartilage tear in his right shoulder that required off-season surgery to repair.

Prior to the 1998 Winter Olympics, an announcement was made that NHL would shut down for two and a half weeks to allow its players to participate in the international tournament for the first time. Vanbiesbrouck was named to the United States team, but spent the majority of the tournament on the bench, playing in one game for only one minute. As a team, the Americans finished in a "disappointing" sixth place.

== Playing style ==
Vanbiesbrouck was a hybrid goaltender who combined the butterfly style and the more traditional stand-up style. He was strong at playing his angles and challenged shooters well. Small for a goaltender, standing only 5' 8", he relied on his quickness to regain his feet after making saves or to make additional saves in goalmouth scrambles. Vanbiesbrouck was aggressive when it came to playing the puck, which helped him tie the Rangers single season record for assists by a goaltender and set the Rangers career record as well (later broken by Henrik Lundqvist). Vanbiesbrouck is the Rangers all-time leader in penalty minutes by a goaltender, with 212.

== Retirement ==
=== Racism against Trevor Daley ===
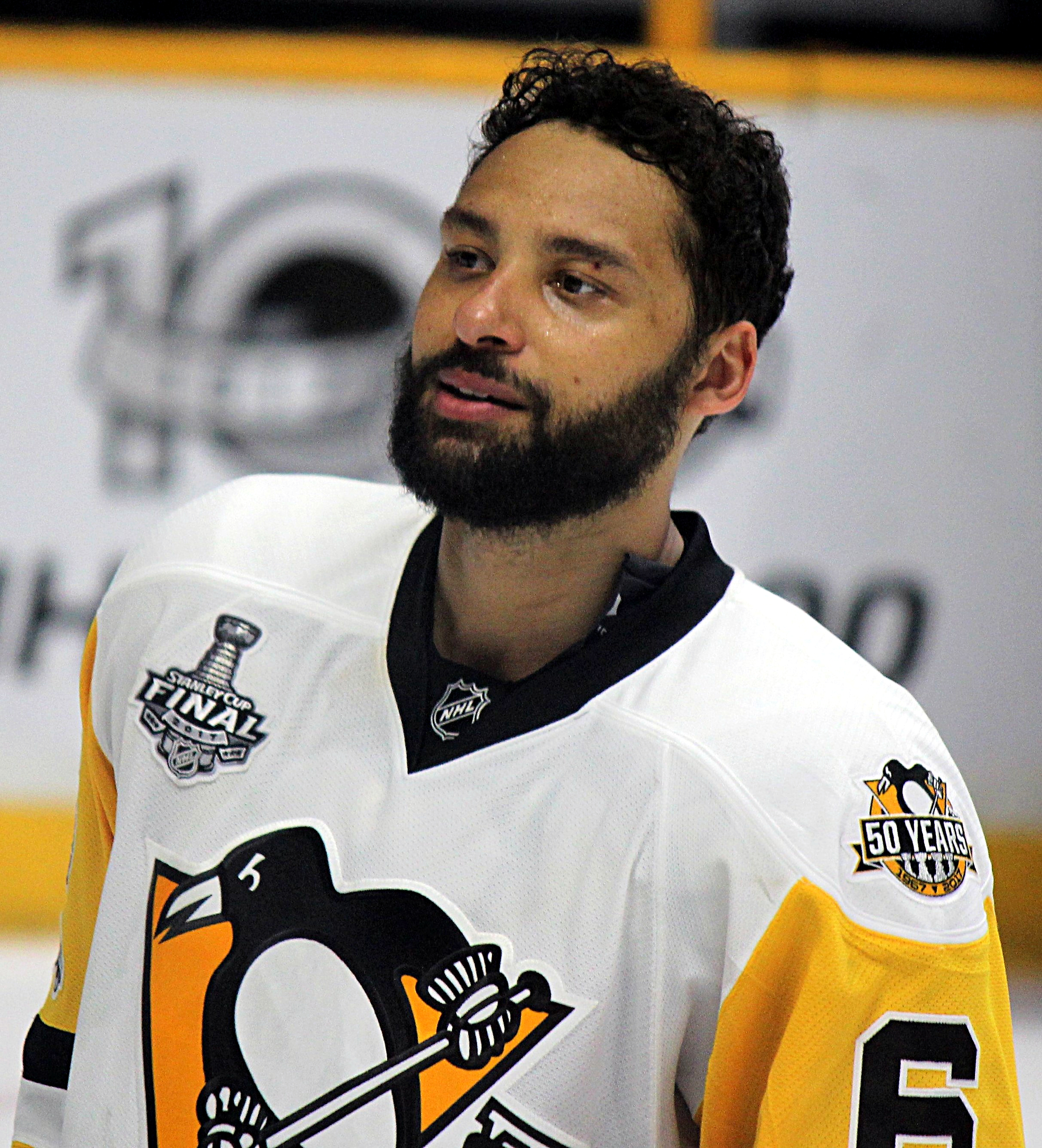
Trevor Daley, shown here with the Pittsburgh Penguins in 2017

When he retired from the NHL, Vanbiesbrouck took over as the head coach and director of hockey operations for the Sault Ste. Marie Greyhounds. In February 2003, the team had a record of 18–24–4–3. One month later, on March 7, the Greyhounds lost 6–1 to the Guelph Storm. After the game, Vanbiesbrouck used a racial slur in expressing his anger with Trevor Daley, a black player and Greyhounds' team captain, to two of Daley's white teammates. Daley was told of the remarks by his teammates and was advised to leave the team by his agent Bobby Orr. Daley returned home to Toronto and informed the commissioner of the OHL about the remarks.

The day after Daley left the team, Vanbiesbrouck resigned his positions as head coach and general manager and sold his ownership stake in the team. In his apology, Vanbiesbrouck stated, "I used the 'N' word instead of calling him Trevor, I used it just not thinking. It's a mistake and consequences have to be paid by me, I've embarrassed everybody and my family by this one comment. It's not what they represent and it's not what the Sault Greyhounds organization represents." He added, "I told Trev this is an old wound with me, I grew up with it. I'm as sorry as anybody that it's stuck with me." Daley returned to the team three days after leaving, but Vanbiesbrouck never returned to a coaching position.

=== Broadcasting and management career ===
After leaving the Greyhounds, Vanbiesbrouck spent some time as a broadcaster, working as an analyst for Versus network as well as hockey broadcasts on HDNet. In 2010, Vanbiesbrouck, along with Steve Goldstein, formed the broadcast team for Westwood One's radio coverage of the Winter Olympic hockey games. In 2013, Vanbiesbrouck was named the general manager and director of hockey operations for the United States Hockey League's (USHL) Muskegon Lumberjacks.

== Personal life ==
Vanbiesbrouck grew up as the youngest of three brothers. His oldest brother, Frank, was a goaltender who played three seasons of junior-A hockey from 1974 until 1977. His other brother, Julian, played left wing for the University of Michigan and briefly played in the International Hockey League as a member of the Toledo Goaldiggers. When Vanbiesbrouck was with the Rangers, his brother Frank showed signs of severe depression and suicidal tendencies. During this time, John attempted to reach out to Frank, occasionally flying separately from the team on road trips to check in on his brother, and talking to him every day. Despite his efforts, Frank committed suicide in 1993. Vanbiesbrouck called Frank's death "devastating", and that he "felt very empty" when Frank died, adding that his Christian faith and the Bible helped him through the difficult time.

While playing with the Flyers, Vanbiesbrouck and his family lived in Moorestown, New Jersey. He and his wife, Rosalinde, have four sons. Their oldest son was diagnosed with Attention Deficit Disorder (ADD) when he was five years old. As a result, Vanbiesbrouck started the Vanbiesbrouck Foundation for children with Attention Deficit Disorder to increase awareness of and raise money for children with ADD. However, when he left Florida via free agency, the foundation was dissolved and the mission of the program went into an information service based in South Florida. Vanbiesbrouck is also the celebrity sponsor of a golf event in support of The Alan T. Brown Foundation to Cure Paralysis. He returned to his home state of Michigan following his playing days.

== Awards and honors ==
- F. W. "Dinty" Moore Trophy (OHL – best rookie goals against average) winner in 1981.
- Selected to the OHL second All-Star team in 1983.
- Selected to the CHL first All-Star team in 1984.
- Terry Sawchuk Trophy winner in 1984 (shared with Ron Scott).
- Tommy Ivan Trophy (CHL Most valuable Player) winner in 1984 (shared with Bruce Affleck).
- Selected to the NHL first All-Star team in 1986.
- Vezina Trophy Winner in 1986.
- Steven McDonald Extra Effort Award winner in 1990 (shared with Kelly Kisio).
- Selected to the NHL second All-Star team in 1994.
- Played in 1994, 1996, and 1997 National Hockey League All-Star Games.
- Became the 15th, and the 2nd American, goaltender in NHL history to record 300 career wins.
- Inducted into the United States Hockey Hall of Fame in October 2007.
- In the 2009 book 100 Ranger Greats, was ranked No. 31 all-time of the 901 New York Rangers who had played during the team's first 82 seasons
- Vanbiesbrouck appears on the NHL 97 cover.

=== Records ===
- New York Rangers all-time franchise record for most assists in a single season by a goaltender (5) (shared).
- New York Rangers all-time franchise record for most career assists by a goaltender (25).
- Third most NHL career wins by an American-born goaltender (374).

== Career statistics ==
=== Regular season and playoffs ===
Bold indicates league leader

			Regular season									Playoffs
Season	Team	League	GP	W	L	T	MIN	GA	SO	GAA	SV%	GP	W	L	MIN	GA	SO	GAA	SV%
1980–81	Sault Ste. Marie Greyhounds	OHL	56	31	16	1	2941	203	0	4.14	—	11	3	3	457	24	1	3.15	—
1981–82	New York Rangers	NHL	1	1	0	0	60	1	0	1.00	.967	—	—	—	—	—	—	—	—
1981–82	Sault Ste. Marie Greyhounds	OHL	31	12	12	2	1686	102	0	3.62	—	7	1	4	276	20	0	4.35	—
1982–83	Sault Ste. Marie Greyhounds	OHL	62	39	21	1	3471	209	0	3.61	—	16	7	6	944	56	1	3.56	—
1983–84	New York Rangers	NHL	3	2	1	0	179	10	0	3.33	.882	1	0	0	1	0	0	0.00	1.000
1983–84	Tulsa Oilers	CHL	37	20	13	2	2153	124	3	3.46	—	4	4	0	240	10	0	2.50	—
1984–85	New York Rangers	NHL	42	12	24	3	2371	166	1	4.20	.877	1	0	0	20	0	0	0.00	1.000
1985–86	New York Rangers	NHL	61	**31**	21	5	3322	184	3	3.32	.887	16	8	8	897	49	**1**	3.38	.897
1986–87	New York Rangers	NHL	50	18	20	5	2652	161	0	3.64	.882	4	1	3	195	11	1	3.38	.900
1987–88	New York Rangers	NHL	56	27	22	7	3315	187	2	3.38	.890	—	—	—	—	—	—	—	—
1988–89	New York Rangers	NHL	56	28	21	4	3207	197	0	3.69	.881	2	0	1	107	6	0	3.37	.889
1989–90	New York Rangers	NHL	47	19	19	7	2734	154	1	3.38	.887	6	2	3	298	15	0	3.02	.902
1990–91	New York Rangers	NHL	40	15	18	6	2257	126	3	3.35	.891	1	0	0	52	1	0	**1.16**	.955
1991–92	New York Rangers	NHL	45	27	13	3	2526	120	2	2.85	.910	7	2	5	368	23	0	3.75	.872
1992–93	New York Rangers	NHL	48	20	18	7	2757	152	4	3.31	.900	—	—	—	—	—	—	—	—
1993–94	Florida Panthers	NHL	57	21	25	11	3440	145	1	2.53	.924	—	—	—	—	—	—	—	—
1994–95	Florida Panthers	NHL	37	14	15	4	2087	86	4	2.47	.914	—	—	—	—	—	—	—	—
1995–96	Florida Panthers	NHL	57	26	20	7	3178	142	2	2.68	.904	**22**	12	**10**	1332	50	1	2.25	.932
1996–97	Florida Panthers	NHL	57	27	19	10	3347	128	2	2.29	.919	5	1	4	328	13	1	2.38	.929
1997–98	Florida Panthers	NHL	60	18	29	11	3451	165	4	2.87	.899	—	—	—	—	—	—	—	—
1998–99	Philadelphia Flyers	NHL	62	27	18	**15**	3712	135	6	2.18	.902	6	2	4	369	9	1	**1.46**	.938
1999–00	Philadelphia Flyers	NHL	50	25	15	9	2950	108	3	2.20	.906	—	—	—	—	—	—	—	—
2000–01	New York Islanders	NHL	44	10	25	5	2390	120	1	3.01	.898	—	—	—	—	—	—	—	—
2000–01	New Jersey Devils	NHL	4	4	0	0	240	6	1	1.50	.935	—	—	—	—	—	—	—	—
2001–02	New Jersey Devils	NHL	5	2	3	0	300	10	0	2.00	.915	—	—	—	—	—	—	—	—
NHL totals			882	374	346	119	50,475	2,503	40	2.98	.899	71	28	38	3,965	177	5	2.68	.915

=== International ===
Year	Team	Event	GP	W	L	T	MIN	GA	SO	GAA	SV%
1982	United States	WJC	5	1	3	0	200	19	0	5.70	—
1983	United States	WJC	5	—	—	—	280	17	0	3.64	—
1985	United States	WC	9	6	3	0	492	46	0	5.64	—
1987	United States	WC	7	2	5	0	419	28	0	4.01	—
1987	United States	CC	4	2	2	0	240	9	0	2.00	.922
1989	United States	WC	5	1	2	1	265	20	0	4.53	—
1991	United States	WC	10	3	4	2	526	41	0	4.67	—
1991	United States	CC	1	1	0	0	60	3	0	3.00	.813
1998	United States	OLY	1	0	0	0	1	0	0	0.00	1.000
Junior totals			10	—	—	—	480	36	0	4.50	—
Senior totals			37	15	16	3	2003	147	0	4.40	—

== See also ==
- Rat trick

Preceded by Kelly Hrudey	Winner of the Tommy Ivan Trophy; 1984; With: Bruce Affleck	Succeeded by None
Preceded by Pelle Lindbergh	Winner of the Vezina Trophy; 1986	Succeeded by Ron Hextall
Preceded by Tony Granato	Steven McDonald Extra Effort Award winner 1990; With: Kelly Kisio	Succeeded by Jan Erixon
Preceded by Craig Hartsburg	Head coach of the Sault Ste. Marie Greyhounds; 2002–2003	Succeeded by Marty Abrams
