= Johann Heinrich Arnold =

Johann Heinrich Arnold, also called Heini, (23 December 1913 - 23 July 1982) was the Elder, that is leader, of the Bruderhof Communities from 1962 until his death in 1982.

Johann Heinrich Arnold was born 23 December 1913 in Oberbozen as second son of Bruderhof founder Eberhard Arnold and his wife Emmy. Since the age of five he lived with his family in the Christian community his parents had founded in 1920 including Sannerz and the Rhönbruderhof in Germany, then England and Primavera, Paraguay. In the 1930s he lived as a university student for some time in Zurich, Switzerland. In 1936 he married Annemarie, née Wachter, and had nine children with her. In 1955 he immigrated to the United States.

He was ordained as Servant of the Word (Diener des Wortes) in 1939, at the Cotswold Bruderhof. In 1941 he became very ill and almost died. He was therefore removed from his office. In 1944 he was even sent away from the community for two years. He was reinstated as Servant of the Word in 1951. In the "great crisis" of the Bruderhof during the years 1959 to 1961 he was the driving force to end socialist ideas at the Bruderhof and to return to the Christian ideas of his father. In 1962 he became the overall leader of the Bruderhof Communities. He served as leader of the Bruderhof until his death in 1982.

== Works ==
- Discipleship, compiled and edited by Hela Ehrlich and Christopher Zimmerman, Plough Publishing House, 1994.
  - 30th anniversary edition released in 2024 as Discipleship: Following Jesus in Daily Life.
- Jesus Calls Each One by Name, Rifton, NY, 1977.
- In the Image of God: Mariage and Chastity in Christian Life, Rifton, NY, 1977.
- Christmas Night, O Night of Nights, Rifton, NY, 1976.
- The Living Word in Men's Heart, Rifton, NY, 1975.
- Man, the Image of God and Modern Psychology, Rifton, NY, 1973.
- Freedom from Sinful Thoughts: Christ Alone Breaks the Curse, Rifton, NY, 1973. (German: Freiheit von Gedankensünden: Nur Christus bricht den Fluch, 1973)

== Literature ==
- Peter Mommsen: Homage to a Broken Man: The Life of J. Heinrich Arnold – A true story of faith, forgiveness, sacrifice, and community, Rifton, NY, 2004.
- Yaacov Oved: The Witness of the Brothers: A History of the Bruderhof, New Brunswick, NJ: Transaction, 1996.
- Bob and Shirley Wagoner: Community in Paraguay: A Visit to the Bruderhof, Farmington, PA: Plough Pub. House, 1991
- Eberhard and Emmy Arnold: Seeking for the Kingdom of God: Origins of the Bruderhof Communities, Rifton, NY: Plough Publishing House, 1974.
- Emmy Arnold: Torches together: the beginning and early years of the Bruderhof Communities Rifton, New York: Plough Publishing House, 1971.
