= Steven McDonald =

New York City Patrolman (1957-2017)

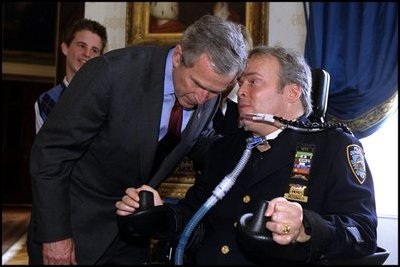
- McDonald with President George W. Bush in 2002
- Born: March 1, 1957
- Died: January 10, 2017 (aged 59)
- Known for: Shot and paralyzed
- Spouse: Patricia Ann "Patti" McDonald
- Relatives: Conor
- Police career
- Department: New York City Police Department

Steven D. McDonald (March 1, 1957 – January 10, 2017) was a New York City Police Department patrolman who was shot and paralyzed on July 12, 1986. The shooting left him quadriplegic.

== Shooting ==
A former U.S. Navy hospital corpsman and third generation NYPD police officer, McDonald was shot in the line of duty by 15-year-old Shavod Jones, one of three boys he was questioning about bicycle thefts in Central Park. McDonald and a co-worker were on patrol in Central Park because there had been reports about a robbery in the park. While attempting to question Jones, McDonald noticed something in another boy's sock, and when he wanted to see what it was, Jones shot McDonald three times. The first bullet hit him in the head, above his eye; the second hit his throat and caused him to have a speaking disability; and the third shattered his spine, paralyzing him from the neck down and leaving him quadriplegic and in need of a ventilator.

Several months after he was shot, McDonald reported to the press that he had forgiven Jones for his actions. McDonald discussed the reasons for his forgiveness in some detail in the foreword of a 2014 book titled Why Forgive?, written by friend and pastor Johann Christoph Arnold.

Jones served nine years in prison for the shooting and had called McDonald to apologize, but the two never met in person after the incident. Jones was killed in a motorcycle crash on September 10, 1995, four days after his release on parole.

== Personal life and death ==
McDonald's wife, Patricia Ann "Patti" McDonald, was elected Mayor of Malverne on Long Island in March 2007. At the time of the shooting, they had been married for less than a year and Patti was pregnant with their son Conor, who followed his father's footsteps by joining the NYPD in 2010. Conor had attained the rank of Sergeant in the force by the time of his father's death.

Steven McDonald died on January 10, 2017, at the age of 59, a few days after suffering a heart attack. He was given a full police funeral at St. Patrick's Cathedral with Cardinal Dolan presiding over the Mass. Thousands of civilians and law enforcement officers gathered inside and outside the cathedral to pay their final respects and goodbyes, and the Mass was broadcast on the city's PIX 11 out of respect for McDonald's legacy. Phillip Phillips, winner of the eleventh season of American Idol, was invited to the wake service and performed his hit song "Home" because it was one of McDonald's favorites, according to his son, Conor.

== Breaking the Cycle program ==
McDonald further promoted his message of forgiveness following his shooting by founding Breaking the Cycle, a program promoting nonviolent conflict resolution. McDonald attended assemblies at high schools or middle schools to tell the students about his personal story of forgiveness. The program was started after McDonald traveled to Northern Ireland multiple times from 1997 to 1999 with his friends Mychal Judge and Johann Christoph Arnold to promote forgiveness in the wake of the conflicts there.

Following his death, McDonald's wife and son have continued working with Breaking the Cycle by telling his story of forgiveness to students.

== Steven McDonald Extra Effort Award ==
The New York Rangers of the National Hockey League (NHL) established the Steven McDonald Extra Effort Award in his honor following the 1987–88 NHL season. McDonald would personally present a Ranger with a trophy and a $25,000 check (in the player's name) made out to the Steven McDonald Foundation. It is the only Rangers award voted for by the fans.

- 1987–88 – Jan Erixon
- 1988–89 – Tony Granato
- 1989–90 – John Vanbiesbrouck and Kelly Kisio
- 1990–91 – Jan Erixon
- 1991–92 – Adam Graves
- 1992–93 – Adam Graves
- 1993–94 – Adam Graves
- 1994–95 – Mark Messier
- 1995–96 – Mark Messier
- 1996–97 – Brian Leetch
- 1997–98 – Wayne Gretzky
- 1998–99 – Adam Graves
- 1999–2000 – Adam Graves
- 2000–01 – Sandy McCarthy
- 2001–02 – Sandy McCarthy
- 2002–03 – Matthew Barnaby
- 2003–04 – Jed Ortmeyer
- 2004–05 – not awarded
- 2005–06 – Henrik Lundqvist
- 2006–07 – Jed Ortmeyer
- 2007–08 – Brandon Dubinsky
- 2008–09 – Ryan Callahan
- 2009–10 – Ryan Callahan
- 2010–11 – Brandon Prust
- 2011–12 – Ryan Callahan
- 2012–13 – Ryan Callahan
- 2013–14 – Mats Zuccarello
- 2014–15 – Cam Talbot
- 2015–16 – Mats Zuccarello
- 2016–17 – Mats Zuccarello
- 2017–18 – Henrik Lundqvist
- 2018–19 – Mika Zibanejad
- 2019–20 – Mika Zibanejad
- 2020–21 – Adam Fox
- 2021–22 – Chris Kreider
- 2022–23 – Ryan Lindgren
- 2023–24 – Vincent Trocheck
- 2024–25 – Will Cuylle
- 2025–26 – Mika Zibanejad

== Police Academy Renaming ==
On February 9, 2026, the NYPD announced that the Queens Police Academy will be renamed in his honor on July 16th, the date McDonald entered the Academy in 1984.
