= Kelly Kisio =

Canadian ice hockey player and scout

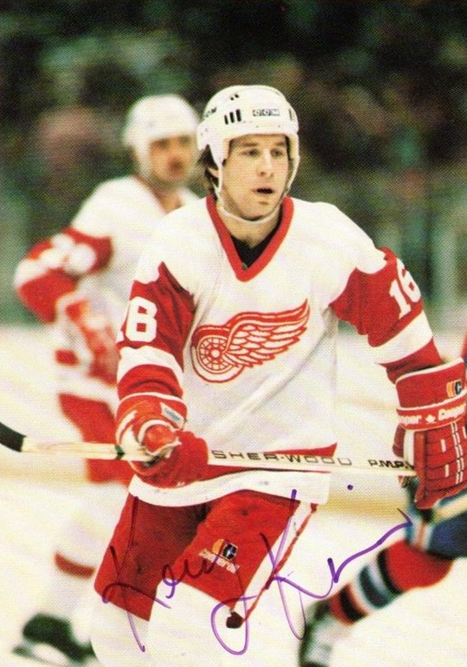
- Kisio in 1985 photo
- Born: September 18, 1959 (age 66) Peace River, Alberta, Canada
- Height: 5 ft 10 in (178 cm)
- Weight: 185 lb (84 kg; 13 st 3 lb)
- Position: Centre
- Shot: Right
- Played for: Detroit Red Wings; New York Rangers; San Jose Sharks; Calgary Flames
- NHL draft: Undrafted
- Playing career: 1980–1995

Kelvin Wade Kisio (born September 18, 1959) is a Canadian former professional ice hockey player who currently serves as a scout for the Vegas Golden Knights of the National Hockey League (NHL). Kisio played 761 games in the NHL as a centre for the Detroit Red Wings, New York Rangers, San Jose Sharks, and Calgary Flames between 1983 and 1995, and was team captain for the Rangers for three and a half years.

== Career ==
Kisio played junior hockey with the Alberta Junior Hockey League's Red Deer Rustlers and Western Hockey League's Calgary Wranglers, producing consecutive 60 goal seasons for the latter.

He played the 1982–83 season with HC Davos in Switzerland. He scored 49 goals and 32 assists. Although Davos was leading the season for more than 20 games, they ended in third place. In his next-to-last game for HC Davos, Kisio scored eight goals and two assists. The game's final score was 19–7. Kisio left three days later for the Detroit Red Wings where he became a valuable player in the NHL.

Kisio's best season in the NHL was in 1992–93 with the San Jose Sharks. That season he tied a career high in goals (26) and points (78) and represented the Sharks in the 1993 NHL All-Star Game in Montreal after Pat Falloon went down with a season-ending shoulder injury.

Kisio ended his playing career with the Calgary Flames in 1995, who were ousted by his former team, San Jose in the playoffs. He then joined the Flames' scouting staff. For the 1998–99 season, he was named general manager of the Calgary Hitmen, who are owned by the Flames. With Kisio as GM, the Hitmen made the playoffs every year but one (2010–11), won four regular season titles, and won the Western Hockey League title in both 1999 and 2010.

== Family ==
Kisio and his wife Linda have three children: Brent, Kurtis, and Kristina. Brent (born December 15, 1982) is the head coach of the Lethbridge Hurricanes of the Western Hockey League, and Kurtis (born June 30, 1984) played 59 games with the Austin Ice Bats of the Central Hockey League during the 2007–08 season.

== Awards ==
- 1979 – WHL Rookie of the Year, with the Calgary Wranglers
- 1990 – Steven McDonald Extra Effort Award (shared with John Vanbiesbrouck)
- 1993 – NHL All-Star
- 2004 – Lloyd Saunders Memorial Trophy, top WHL executive

== Legacy ==
In the 2009 book 100 Ranger Greats, the authors ranked Kisio at No. 80 all-time of the 901 New York Rangers who had played during the team's first 82 seasons.

== Career statistics ==
=== Regular season and playoffs ===
			Regular season					Playoffs
Season	Team	League	GP	G	A	Pts	PIM	GP	G	A	Pts	PIM
1976–77	Red Deer Rustlers	AJHL	60	53	48	101	101	—	—	—	—	—
1977–78	Red Deer Rustlers	AJHL	58	74	68	142	66	—	—	—	—	—
1978–79	Calgary Wranglers	WHL	70	60	61	121	73	15	12	16	28	4
1979–80	Calgary Wranglers	WHL	71	65	73	138	64	2	1	0	1	4
1980–81	Kalamazoo Wings	IHL	31	27	16	43	48	8	7	7	14	13
1980–81	Adirondack Red Wings	AHL	41	10	14	24	43	—	—	—	—	—
1981–82	Dallas Black Hawks	CHL	78	62	39	101	59	16	12	17	29	38
1982–83	HC Davos	NDA	38	49	38	87	—	—	—	—	—
1982–83	Detroit Red Wings	NHL	14	4	3	7	0	—	—	—	—	—
1983–84	Detroit Red Wings	NHL	70	23	37	60	34	4	1	0	1	4
1984–85	Detroit Red Wings	NHL	75	20	41	61	56	3	0	2	2	2
1985–86	Detroit Red Wings	NHL	76	21	48	69	85	—	—	—	—	—
1986–87	New York Rangers	NHL	70	24	40	64	73	4	0	1	1	2
1987–88	New York Rangers	NHL	77	23	55	78	88	—	—	—	—	—
1988–89	New York Rangers	NHL	70	26	36	62	91	4	0	0	0	9
1989–90	New York Rangers	NHL	68	22	44	66	105	10	2	8	10	8
1990–91	New York Rangers	NHL	51	15	20	35	58	—	—	—	—	—
1991–92	San Jose Sharks	NHL	48	11	26	37	54	—	—	—	—	—
1992–93	San Jose Sharks	NHL	78	26	52	78	90	—	—	—	—	—
1993–94	Calgary Flames	NHL	51	7	23	30	28	7	0	2	2	8
1994–95	Calgary Flames	NHL	12	7	4	11	6	7	3	2	5	19
NHL totals			761	229	429	658	768	39	6	15	21	52

Sporting positions
Preceded by Ron Greschner	New York Rangers captain 1987–91	Succeeded by Mark Messier
Awards
Preceded by Tony Granato	Steven McDonald Extra Effort Award Winner; 1989–90 NHL season	Succeeded by Jan Erixon
