= Rifton, New York =

CDP in New York, United States

- Census-designated place
- Location in Ulster County and the state of New York
- Coordinates: 41°50′15″N 74°02′16″W
- Country: United States
- State: New York
- County: Ulster
- Village incorporated: 1901
- Village dissolved: 1919

Government
  - Type: unincorporated

Area
  - Total: 1.24 sq mi (3.21 km^{2})
  - Land: 1.24 sq mi (3.21 km^{2})
  - Water: 0 sq mi (0.00 km^{2})
- Elevation: 180 ft (55 m)

Population (2020)
  - Total: 481
  - Density: 388.1/sq mi (149.83/km^{2})
- Time zone: UTC-5 (Eastern (EST))
  - Summer (DST): UTC-4 (EDT)
- ZIP code: 12471
- Area code: 845
- FIPS code: 36-61797
- GNIS feature ID: 0962517

Rifton is a hamlet (and census-designated place) in Ulster County, New York, United States. The population was 481 at the 2020 census.

Rifton is home to the Woodcrest Bruderhof and is located near the western town line of the Town of Esopus on Route 213.

== History ==
Rifton had its beginnings as a smattering of several hamlets and communities. Dashville hamlet was the first of the hamlets to be settled. By 1824, several mills had been built along the Wallkill by Ezekiel Eltinge. In 1861, Jeremiah W. Dimick bought the mill in Arnoldton and renamed the community Rifton Glen. Swartekill hamlet was so named because of its location on the Swartekill Creek where it meets the Wallkill; Dutch "swartekill" means "black river" in English. The hamlet was home to powder mills as early as 1865.

Rifton was incorporated as a village on May 20, 1901, encompassing what had been the hamlets of Rifton Glen, Swartekill, and Dashville and the communities of Saltpeterville, and Perrine's Bridge. After the village's mills closed, the state legislature dissolved the village in 1919.

== Geography ==
Rifton is located at 41°50′15″N 74°2′16″W (41.8375, -74.0378).

According to the United States Census Bureau, the CDP has a total area of 1.2 square miles (3.1 km^{2}), all land.

== Demographics ==
Historical population
Census	Pop.	Note	%±
2000	501		—
2010	456		−9.0%
2020	481		5.5%
U.S. Decennial Census

As of the census of 2000, there were 501 people, 207 households, and 133 families residing in the CDP. The population density was 421.9 inhabitants per square mile (162.9/km^{2}). There were 235 housing units at an average density of 197.9 per square mile (76.4/km^{2}). The racial makeup of the CDP was 94.61% White, 1.40% African American, 0.60% Native American, 0.60% Asian, 0.40% from other races, and 2.40% from two or more races. Hispanic or Latino of any race were 1.80% of the population.

There were 207 households, out of which 29.5% had children under the age of 18 living with them, 54.1% were married couples living together, 7.7% had a female householder with no husband present, and 35.7% were non-families. 26.6% of all households were made up of individuals, and 13.0% had someone living alone who was 65 years of age or older. The average household size was 2.42 and the average family size was 3.01.

In the CDP, the population was spread out, with 25.0% under the age of 18, 4.6% from 18 to 24, 28.9% from 25 to 44, 27.1% from 45 to 64, and 14.4% who were 65 years of age or older. The median age was 41 years. For every 100 females, there were 90.5 males. For every 100 females age 18 and over, there were 88.9 males.

The median income for a household in the CDP was $44,375, and the median income for a family was $49,643. Males had a median income of $36,500 versus $35,938 for females. The per capita income for the CDP was $22,015. None of the population or families were below the poverty line.

== Education ==
The school district for the CDP is Kingston City School District. The comprehensive high school of the Kingston City district is Kingston High School.

== Notable person ==
Sojourner Truth was given the name Isabella Baumfree when she was born to slaves on the Hardenbergh farm in Rifton, in what was then Swartekill hamlet.
