= Eberhard Arnold =

German Christian intentional community leader

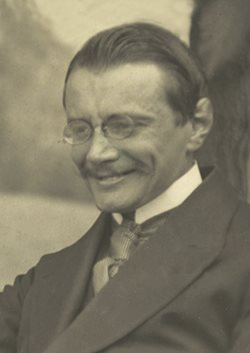
- Born: 26 July 1883; Königsberg, Prussia, German Empire
- Died: 22 November 1935 (aged 52); Darmstadt, Hesse, German Reich
- Burial place: Near Sannerz, Prussian Free State, German Reich
- Education: University of Erlangen; University of Halle; University of Breslau
- Organization(s): Salvation Army, Bruderhof
- Movement: Anabaptist Movement
- Spouse: Emmy von Hollander (m. 1909)
- Parents: Carl Franklin Arnold (father); Elisabeth Voight (mother)

Eberhard Arnold (26 July 1883 – 22 November 1935) was a German theologian and Christian writer. He was the founder of the Bruderhof in 1920.

== Early life ==
Arnold was born in Königsberg, East Prussia, Germany, the third child of Carl Franklin and Elizabeth (Voight) Arnold. His father was a doctor of theology and philosophy, and his paternal grandfather was a pastor and missionary of the Evangelical State Church of Prussia's older Provinces. Eberhard Arnold's life as a youth was unconventional. In 1899 at age 16, Arnold experienced an inner change, which he acknowledged as God's acceptance and the forgiveness of sins, and felt a calling to "go and witness to my truth."

After he finished school, Arnold studied education, philosophy, and theology in Breslau, Halle, and Erlangen. He engaged in Christian youth work and in evangelism among the poor through the Salvation Army. While in Halle, he became part of the German Student Christian Movement, and its General Secretary. In 1907 he and his wife von Hollander seceded from the Evangelical State Church, or Evangelische Kirche. His work with the Salvation Army increased his sympathy for the oppressed classes of people and strengthened his stand for preaching conversion and salvation. Here in Halle, he also met Emmy von Hollander and married her in 1909.

Arnold was a sought-after speaker in early 20th-century Germany. He became troubled by the church's connection to the state, and in 1908, at age 25, Arnold was baptized and left the Protestant state church. He began to thoroughly investigate Anabaptist history, which apparently influenced his taking his life and ministry in a radical direction. In 1915 he became editor of Die Furche (The Furrow), the periodical of the Student Christian Movement, and editor of the Das Neue Werk (New Venture) Publishing House in Schlüchtern, Germany, in 1919.

== Founding the Bruderhof Community ==
At age 37, he abandoned middle-class life and the established church, believing it to be complicit in the atrocities of the war. In 1920, he moved with his wife and children to the village of Sannerz in central Germany, and founded the Bruderhof with seven adult members and five children. The community experienced both trouble and growth, but by the mid-1920s the Sannerz farm was too small. In 1926, they bought a farm in the Fulda district and established the Rhön Bruderhof. When Arnold discovered that Hutterite communities still existed in North America, he contacted them and engaged in a long period of correspondence. In 1930 he traveled to America and stayed for about a year, visiting all the communities of Hutterian brethren in the United States and Canada. In December of that year, he was commissioned by them as a missionary to Europe.

In November 1933, the Bruderhof community was raided by the Gestapo, who searched for arms and anti-Nazi literature, and closed the community's school. The Bruderhof sent their school children to Switzerland, and began to search for another place to establish their community. When the teacher sent by the government arrived in 1934, he found no children to teach. Property was acquired in the Alps in Liechtenstein, and in March 1934, the Alm Bruderhof was founded. Arnold spent the last two years of his life suffering from a leg injury that would lead to his death, while attempting to shepherd his flock to safety. Nevertheless, he remained active in travelling, lecturing and writing until his death in Darmstadt on 22 November 1935.

The Bruderhof is still operational as an intentional community in the United States, Paraguay, the United Kingdom, Germany, Austria, and Australia. Plough, the publishing house he helped to found, is still operated by the Bruderhof, and carries many of his works.

== Family ==
Eberhard Arnold married his wife Emmy (1884–1980), née von Hollander, 20 December 1910. She outlived her husband by 45 years, following the Bruderhof to England, Paraguay, and eventually the United States. The couple had five children: Emi-Margret, born 1911, Eberhard-Heinrich, called Hardy, born 1912, Johann Heinrich, called Heini, born 1913, Hans-Hermann, born 1916 and Monika, born 1918.

== Works ==
- Das Gewissen, Silum 1936.
- Licht und Feuer, 1933. (Title of the English translation: Salt and Light)
- Der Gott Mammon, 1930. (Title of the English translation: God and Anti-God)
- Die ersten Christen nach dem Tode der Apostel, Berlin 1926. (Title of the English translation: The early Christians after the death of the apostles )
- Warum wir in Gemeinschaft leben, 1925. (Title of the English translation: Why we live in community)
- Liebesleben und Liebe, Sannerz, 1921. (Title of the English translation: Love and marriage in the spirit)
- Die Religiosität der heutigen Jugend, Berlin, 1919.
- Innenland, Berlin, 1918. (Title of the English translation: Inner Land)
- Die drei Bücher im Felde, Gotha, 1915.
- Der Krieg, ein Aufruf zur Innerlichkeit, Gotha, 1914.
- Lebensweise lebendiger Gemeinden, Kassel, 1913. (Title of the English translation: Living Churches: the essence of their life)
- Urchristliches und Antichristliches im Werdegang Friedrich Nietzsches, Eilenburg, 1910.
- Nietzsches religiöse entwicklung und das Christentum (1910)
- Salz und Licht: Über die Bergpredigt (Brendow-Verlag)
- Eberhard Arnold Centennial Editions (Plough), Inner Land: A Guide into the Heart of the Gospel
  - The Inner Life ISBN 9780874861679
  - The Conscience ISBN 9780874862478
  - Experiencing God ISBN 9780874862966
  - Fire and Spirit ISBN 9780874863208
  - The Living Word ISBN 9781636080154

== Literature ==
- Markus Baum: Against The Wind: Eberhard Arnold and the Bruderhof, 1998 Rifton, NY: Plough Publishing House, 1998. ISBN 9780874869538
- Yaacov Oved: The Witness of the Brothers: A History of the Bruderhof, New Brunswick, NJ: Transaction, 1996. ISBN 9781138539518
- Stephan Wehowsky: Religiöse Interpretation politischer Erfahrung: Eberhard Arnold und die Neuwerkbewegung als Exponenten des religiösen Sozialismus zur Zeit der Weimarer Republik, Göttingen 1980.
- Emmy Arnold: Eberhard Arnold's Life and Work, 1964.
