= 2026 Winter Olympics marketing =

2026 Winter Olympics marketing was a long running campaign that began since Milan and Cortina d'Ampezzo won its bid to host the games in 2019.

== Symbols ==
=== Emblem ===
Energy logo

Print logo (black)

Print logo (white)

The official emblem "Future" (Futura) was unveiled on 30 March 2021 in an online live stream announcement after a public vote decided between two options, marking the first time the public chose the emblem of an Olympic Games. Future achieved a 74% majority from a total 871,000 votes. The emblem is a stylized rendition of the number 26 lightly drawn in a single gesture in snow, meant to represent the idea of small gestures being able to change the world. The emblem was developed by Landor Associates.

=== Slogan ===
"IT's Your Vibe"

On 23 February 2025, the Milan Cortina 2026 committee announced the slogan of the Winter Games "IT's Your Vibe" with "IT" meant to refer to the abbreviation of host country Italy, as well as the message of celebrating the atmosphere and emotion of the Games.

=== Mascot ===
The mascots "Tina and Milo" were unveiled on 7 September 2024 at the Sanremo Music Festival 2024, after an online vote among a list of candidates. They are two anthropomorphic stoats portrayed as brother and sister and were named after the two host cities of the Games. They were designed by students in a school in Taverna.

== Corporate sponsorship ==
Sponsors of the 2026 Winter Olympics
Worldwide Olympic Partners
- AB InBev (Corona Cero)
- Airbnb
- Alibaba Group
- Allianz
- Coca-Cola-Mengniu Dairy
- Deloitte
- Omega SA
- Procter & Gamble
- Samsung Electronics
- TCL Technology
- Visa Inc.
Premium Partners
- Amer Sports (Salomon Group)
- Enel
- Eni
- FS Group
- Intesa Sanpaolo
- Leonardo
- Poste Italiane
- Stellantis
Partners
- A2A
- Autostrade of Italy
- Deloitte
- Emporio Armani
- ENIT
- Esselunga
- FiberCop
- Fiera Milano
- GL events
- Hewlett Packard Enterprise (Juniper Networks)
- Pirelli
- Randstad NV
- TIM Group
Sponsors
- Bauerfeind
- Cassa Depositi e Prestiti
- Eli Lilly and Company
- Esaote
- Fincantieri
- FNM Group
- Grana Padano
- Herbalife
- Intercom Dr. Leitner
- Istituto Poligrafico e Zecca dello Stato
- IDM Südtirol – Alto Adige
- ITA Airways
- KIKO
- La Rinascente
- Prosecco
- Salesforce
- Technogym
- Terna Group
- Trentino Marketing
- Uber
- Valtellina
Official Supporters
- Airweave
- CTS Eventim (TicketOne)
- Eni (Versalis)
- EssilorLuxottica
- Kässbohrer Geländefahrzeug
- Liski
- Rapiscan Systems
- RGS Events
- Riello UPS
- SEA Aeroporti di Milano
- TechnoAlpin
- Tinexta Infocert
- Venice Marco Polo Airport
Official Hospitality Provider
- On Location

== See also ==
- 2014 Winter Olympics marketing
- 2018 Winter Olympics marketing
- 2022 Winter Olympics marketing
