= 2010 Winter Olympics marketing =

2010 Winter Olympics marketing was a long running campaign that began when Vancouver won its bid to host the games in 2003.

== Symbols ==
=== Emblem ===
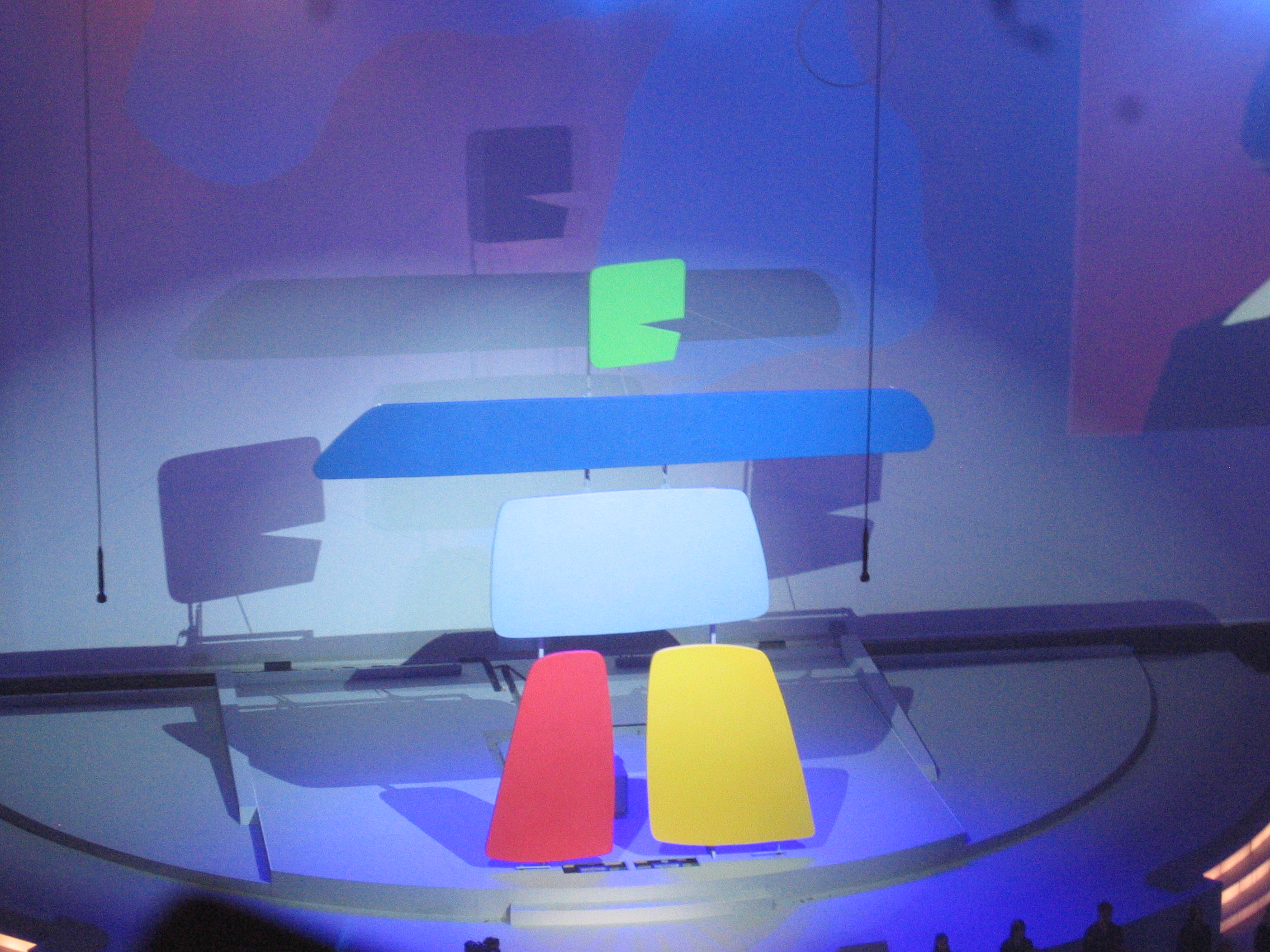
Unveiling ceremony of the 2010 Winter Olympics logo, Ilanaaq, April 23, 2005

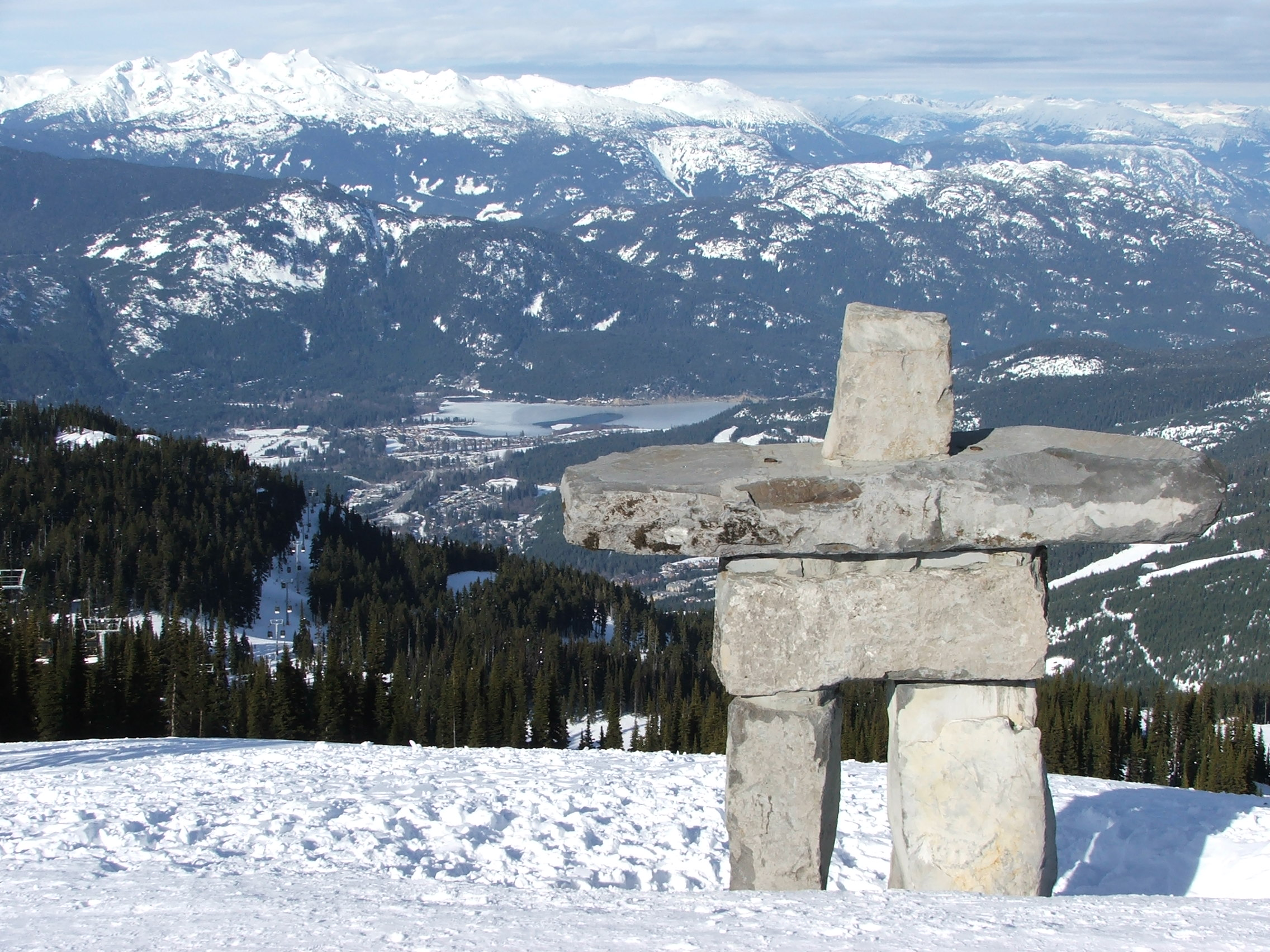
A statue of Ilanaaq, located on Whistler Mountain

The 2010 Winter Olympics logo was unveiled on April 23, 2005, and is named Ilanaaq the Inunnguaq. Ilanaaq is the Inuktitut word for friend. The logo was based on the Inukshuk (stone landmark or cairn) built by Alvin Kanak for the Northwest Territories Pavilion at Expo 86 and donated to the City of Vancouver after the event. It is now used as a landmark on English Bay Beach.

=== Slogan ===
The slogan for the 2010 Olympics was "With glowing hearts" (French: Des plus brillants exploits). The slogan is a reference to Canada's national anthem, O Canada.

=== Look of the Games ===
Leo Obstbaum (1969–2009), the late director of design for the 2010 Winter Olympics, oversaw and designed many of the main symbols of the Games, including the mascots, medals and the design of the Olympic torches.

=== Mascots ===
The mascots for the 2010 Winter Olympic and Paralympic Games were designed by Vicki Wong and Michael C. Murphy of Meomi Design and introduced on November 27, 2007. Inspired by traditional First Nations creatures, the mascots include:

- Miga – A mythical sea bear, part orca and part Kermode bear.
- Quatchi – A sasquatch, who wears winter boots and blue earmuffs.
- Sumi – An animal guardian spirit who wears the hat of an orca whale, flies with the wings of the mighty Thunderbird and runs on the strong furry legs of a black bear.
- Mukmuk – A Vancouver Island marmot.^{[A]}

== Coins ==
The Royal Canadian Mint produced a series of commemorative coins celebrating the 2010 Games, and in partnership with CTV allowed users to vote on the Top 10 Canadian Olympic Winter Moments; where designs honouring the top three were added to the series of coins.

== Multimedia ==
=== DVD set ===
An international release of a DVD box set of the Olympics was released on 15 June 2010 in English and French.

=== Albums ===
Three albums, Canada's Hockey Anthems: Sounds of the Vancouver 2010 Winter Olympic Games, Sounds of Vancouver 2010: Opening Ceremony Commemorative Album, and Sounds of Vancouver 2010: Closing Ceremony Commemorative Album, composed, arranged and produced by Dave Pierce, were released to accompany the Games. Pierce's Music Direction for the opening and closing ceremonies led him to win the Primetime Emmy Award for "Outstanding Music Direction" in 2010.

== Songs ==
=== Theme song ===
There was not an official song for the games. Though often confused as such, "I Believe", was the "official song" of the Canadian broadcasters (the Canada's Olympic Broadcast Media Consortium). The song was sung by Nikki Yanofsky representing Anglophone Canada and Annie Villeneuve represented Francophone Canada.

== Video games ==
Two official video games have been released to commemorate the Games: Mario & Sonic at the Olympic Winter Games was released for Wii and Nintendo DS in October 2009, while Vancouver 2010 was released in January 2010 for Xbox 360, Windows and PlayStation 3.

== Stamps ==
Canada Post released many stamps to commemorate the Vancouver Games including, one for each of the mascots and one to celebrate the first Gold won in Canada. Many countries' postal services have also released stamps, such as the US, Germany, Australia (who present medallists with a copy of the stamps depicting their image), Austria, Belarus, Croatia, Czech Republic, Estonia, France, Italy, Liechtenstein, Lithuania, Poland, Switzerland, Turkey and Ukraine.

== Corporate sponsorship and advertising ==
=== Sponsors ===
Sponsors of the 2010 Winter Olympics
Worldwide Olympic Partners
- Acer Inc.
- Atos Origin
- Coca-Cola
- General Electric
- McDonald's
- Omega SA
- Panasonic
- Samsung Electronics
- Visa Inc.
National Partners
- Bell Canada
- General Motors Canada (Chevrolet)
- Hudson's Bay Company
- Petro-Canada
- RONA
- Royal Bank of Canada
Official Supporters
- Air Canada
- BC Hydro
- Bombardier Inc.
- British Columbia Lottery Corporation
- Canadian Pacific Railway
- Insurance Corporation of British Columbia
- Jet Set Sports
- Ricoh
- Royal Canadian Mint
- Teck Resources
Official Suppliers
- 3M
- Acklands-Grainger
- Aggreko
- Avaya
- ALDA Pharmaceuticals
- Aquilini Investment Group
- Birks Group
- Britco
- Canada's Olympic Broadcast Media Consortium
- Canada Post
- Cold-fX
- Concord Pacific Developments
- Deloitte
- Dow Chemical Company
- EPCOR Utilities
- Garrett Metal Detectors
- General Mills
- George Weston Limited
- Hain Celestial Group
- Haworth Inc.
- Jackson-Triggs
- Karl's Global Events
- Millennium Development Corporation
- Molson Brewery
- Nike, Inc.
- Offsetters
- Purolator Inc.
- Saputo Inc.
- Sleep Country Canada
- SNC-Lavalin
- Sun Microsystems
- Tickets.com
- TransCanada Corporation
- Vancouver Airport Authority
- Workopolis
- Wrigley Company
Print Media Suppliers
- Canwest
- The Globe and Mail
- La Presse

== See also ==
- 2014 Winter Olympics marketing
- 2018 Winter Olympics marketing
