= 2022 Winter Olympics marketing =

2022 Winter Olympics marketing was a long running campaign that began since Beijing won its bid to host the games in 2015.

== Symbols ==
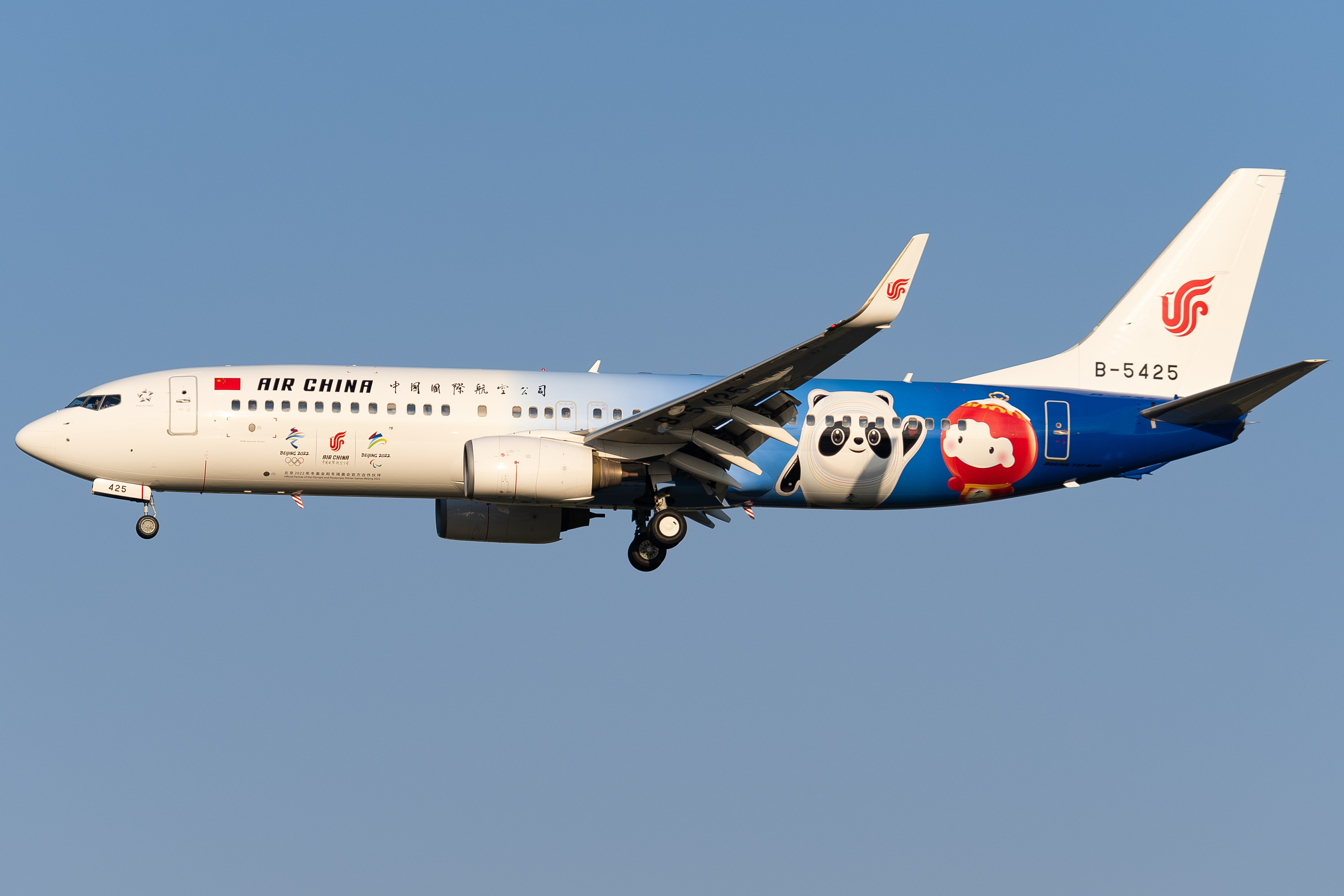
An Air China Boeing 737-800 with 2022 Winter Olympics special livery, featuring the emblems and mascots

=== Emblem ===
The official emblem "Winter Dream" (冬梦) was unveiled on 15 December 2017 at the Beijing National Aquatics Center. The emblem is a stylized rendition of the character "冬" (Winter) inspired by winter snow, with a ribbon motif. The top is meant to resemble a skier and the bottom is meant to resemble a skater. The emblem also features the Olympic colors (except black) and the Chinese flag colors. The emblem was designed by Lin Cunzhen who also created the Nanjing 2014 logo.

=== Slogan ===
The Games' promotional slogan is Joyful Rendezvous Upon Pure Ice and Snow (Chinese: 纯洁的冰雪，激情的约会), which was used for the candidature process for Beijing to bid for the 2022 Games. On September 17, 2021 the Beijing 2022 announce the slogan of Olympic Winter Games "Together for a Shared Future!" (Chinese: 一起向未来！Yīqǐ xiàng wèilái!). A song with the same name, Together for a Shared Future, was sung in two versions: one by Jackson Yee, the other by William Chan and Tia Ray; to promote the slogan of the Winter Olympics and Paralympics.

=== Mascot ===
The mascot "Bing Dwen Dwen" (Chinese: 冰墩墩; pinyin: Bīng Dūn Dūn) was unveiled on 17 September 2019 at the Shougang Ice Hockey Arena and was designed by Cao Xue. The giant panda, is often regarded as one main symbols of China. Its helmet is also indicative of the snow and ice of winter sports. Along with the Olympic mascot, the Paralympic mascot was also revealed on the same day.

== Corporate sponsorship ==
Sponsors of the 2022 Winter Olympics
Worldwide Olympic Partners
- Airbnb
- Alibaba Group
- Allianz
- Atos
- Bridgestone
- Coca-Cola-Mengniu Dairy
- Intel
- Omega SA
- Panasonic
- Procter & Gamble
- Samsung Electronics
- Toyota
- Visa Inc.
Official Partners
- Air China
- Anta Sports
- Bank of China
- China National Petroleum Corporation
- China Three Gorges Corporation
- China Unicom
- People's Insurance Company of China
- Shougang Group
- Sinopec
- State Grid Corporation of China
- Yili Group
Official Sponsors
- Beijing Beiao Group
- Beijing Cultural Investment Development Group
- Beijing Yanjing Brewery
- Hengyuanxiang Group (HYX)
- Jinlongyu Cooking Oils
- Panpan Foods
- Qianxin
- Shunxin Agriculture
- Tsingtao Brewery
- Yuanfudao
- Yum China
Official Exclusive Suppliers
- 3trees
- BOSS Zhipin
- China Post
- Dongdao
- EF Education First
- iFlytek
- Hongyuan
- Hylink
- Landsky
- Mars Inc. (Snickers)
Official Suppliers
- 1Rock
- BBCA Biochemical
- Beijing Gehua CATV Network
- Guangdong Dongpeng
- Hubei Broadcasting & Television Information Network
- Huangzhou Nabel Crematic
- Keeson
- Kingsoft
- PwC
- Shijiazhuang Banknote Printing
- Shuhua Fitness
- Suirui Group
- Tintan Furniture

== See also ==
- 2010 Winter Olympics marketing
- 2014 Winter Olympics marketing
- 2018 Winter Olympics marketing
