= 2018 Winter Olympics marketing =

2018 Winter Olympics marketing was a long running campaign that began when Pyeongchang won its bid to host the games in 2011.

== Symbols ==
=== Emblem ===
The emblem for the Games was unveiled on 3 May 2013. It is a stylised representation of the hangul letters ㅍ p and ㅊ ch, these being the initial sounds of 평창 Pyeongchang. The left-hand symbol is said to represent the Korean philosophical triad of heaven, earth and humanity (Korean: 천지인 cheon-ji-in), and the right-hand symbol represents a crystal of ice. In the emblem and all official materials, Pyeongchang was stylised in CamelCase as "PyeongChang", in order to alleviate potential confusion with Pyongyang, the similarly-named capital of neighbouring North Korea.

=== Look of the Games ===
5 primary colours were used, with venues using one of these colour families for branding. Different venues had different colours depending on the sport.

=== Mascots ===
The official mascots of the 2018 Winter Olympics and Paralympics were unveiled on 2 June 2016. The Olympic mascot, Soohorang (Korean: 수호랑), is a white tiger. The mascot's name is a portmanteau of "Sooho", a Korean word for "protection", and "Rang" which is derived both from the Korean word for "tiger" and from the name of a traditional Korean folk song originating from Gangwon Province. Tigers have a strong association with Korean culture and folklore.

== Video games ==
Intel Extreme Masters Season 12 – Pyeongchang
Tournament information
- Sport: StarCraft II
- Location: Pyeongchang, South Korea
- Administrator: Electronic Sports League

Final positions
- Champions: (Canada) Sasha "Scarlett" Hostyn
- Runner-up: (South Korea) Kim "sOs" Yoo-jin

In June 2017, Ubisoft announced that it would release an expansion pack for its winter sports video game Steep entitled Road to the Olympics, which features new game modes and content inspired by the 2018 Winter Olympics.

In November 2017, the IOC announced it would support and sponsor an Intel Extreme Masters StarCraft II tournament in Pyeongchang preceding the Games. Its support of the tournament as a de facto demonstration event came on the heels of a report by the IOC which recognised that eSports "could be considered as a sporting activity". The tournament was won by Sasha "Scarlett" Hostyn of Canada; she became the second North American pro to place first at a major StarCraft II tournament in South Korea, and the first woman to win a major tournament.

== Corporate sponsorship and advertising ==
The 2018 Winter Olympics saw increasing granularity in official sponsorships for technology vendors; Intel signed with the IOC to become part of its Worldwide Olympic Partner program, to promote 5G wireless technology, as well as broadcasting technology such as 360-degree video and virtual reality. Alibaba Group was also named the official e-commerce and cloud services provider. These categories affected how the vendors were allowed to promote themselves within the context of the Olympics: Samsung could showcase VR experiences but only within the context of its own smartphones due to Intel's sponsorship rights in relation to VR; Alibaba could not promote Alipay due to Visa Inc. sponsorship rights; and Intel could not promote end-user applications of 5G due to national sponsorship rights held by KT Corporation.

In 2015, Japanese automaker Toyota became the first-ever Worldwide Olympic Partner in the "Mobility" category, beginning 2017. However, Toyota elected to waive its domestic sponsorship rights for these Games to Hyundai Motor Company and Kia Motors, citing their near-dominance of the South Korean automobile industry, as well as their support of the Pyeongchang bid. As a result, Toyota did not perform any Olympic-related marketing in South Korea, the fleet of official IOC vehicles were provided by Hyundai and Kia, while Hyundai used the Games to showcase its Nexo hydrogen fuel cell SUV and self-driving vehicle technology.

=== Sponsors ===
Sponsors of the 2018 Winter Olympics
Worldwide Olympic Partners
- Alibaba Group
- Atos
- Bridgestone
- Coca-Cola
- Dow Chemical Company
- General Electric
- Intel
- Omega SA
- Panasonic
- Procter & Gamble
- Samsung Electronics
- Toyota
- Visa Inc.
Official Partners
- Hyundai-Kia
- Korea Electric Power Corporation
- Korean Air
- KT Corporation
- LG Electronics
- Lotte
- McDonald's
- POSCO
- SK Group (SK Telecom)
- Samsung
- The North Face
Official Sponsors
- Aggreko
- CJ Group
- EF Education First
- Hanwha (Hanwha Life Insurance)
- Kangwon Land
- KEB Hana Bank
- Korea Hydro & Nuclear Power
- Korea Land and Housing Corporation
- Naver
- Samsung Fire & Marine Insurance
- Samsung Life Insurance
- Shinsegae
- SsangYong Information & Communication Corp
Official Suppliers
- Bae, Kim and Lee
- Bombardier Inc.
- Daedong
- Daewon Rental
- EWP
- Hanjin (Hanjin and Hanjin Travel)
- Hanssem
- Huawei
- Hyundai Department Store
- Incheon International Airport Corporation
- KMIG
- Korail
- Korea Airports Corporation
- Korea Midland Power
- Korea South-East Power
- Korea Southern Power
- Korea Western Power
- Pagoda Academy
- PwC (Samil)
- S-Oil
- Samsung C&T Corporation
- Samsung Securities
- Seoul Tent
- Technogym
Official Supporters
- Ahnlab
- Airbnb
- Bauerfeind
- Cheorwon Odae-ssal
- Daegwanryoung Hanwoo
- Douzone
- DY Corporation
- DYFlag
- Gangwon Ginseng Nonghyup
- Gangwon Potato Nonghyup
- Hanbando Nonghyup
- Hancom
- Hoengseong County
- Hoengseong Hanwoo
- Influential Inc.
- Interpark
- Jeongseon Apple
- Jet Set Sports
- Kelly Services
- KEPCO E&C
- KEPCO Electric Power Data Network
- KEPCO Nuclear Fuel
- KEPCO Plant Service & Engineering
- Korea Minting and Security Printing Corporation
- Korea Sports Promotion Foundation
- KukDong Metal Fence
- LS Group
- Ottogi
- Maeil Dairies
- Noodle Lovers
- Smart Planet
- Solaewon
- Somunsa
- The iLUKA Collective

== See also ==
- 2010 Winter Olympics marketing
- 2014 Winter Olympics marketing
