= Mark Messier Leadership Award =

Award

- Sport: Ice hockey
- Awarded for: Individual who leads by positive example through on-ice performance, motivation of team members and a dedication to community activities and charitable causes.

History
- First award: 2007
- Most recent: Gabriel Landeskog; Colorado Avalanche

The Mark Messier Leadership Award is a National Hockey League (NHL) award that recognizes an individual as a superior leader within their sport, and as a contributing member of society. The award is given to a player selected by Hockey Hall of Fame center Mark Messier to honor an individual who leads by positive example through on-ice performance, motivation of team members and a dedication to community activities and charitable causes. It was first awarded during the 2006–07 NHL season and sponsored by Cold-fX.

== History ==
In its first season, the Mark Messier Leadership Award was awarded quite differently from most other trophies in the NHL. In 2006–07, five players were honored with monthly awards as selected by the NHL based on the qualification of potential recipients, while the final decision was made by Mark Messier. At the end of the regular season, one player is chosen as the Leader of the Year. The first winner of the annual award was Chris Chelios of the Detroit Red Wings. The league has not announced monthly winners since 2007–08.

The award's namesake, Mark Messier, played in the NHL for twenty-five seasons with the Edmonton Oilers, New York Rangers, and Vancouver Canucks; his 1,887 regular-season points are third all-time behind Jaromir Jagr and Wayne Gretzky, and his 1,756 regular-season games third to Patrick Marleau and Gordie Howe (he is first in games played, including playoffs). Messier is, to date, the only person to lead two separate franchises to the Stanley Cup as captain, accomplishing this with the Oilers in 1990 and with the Rangers in 1994.

== Winners ==
Key
C	Centre
LW	Left Wing
D	Defence
RW	Right Wing
G	Goaltender

Player is still active in the NHL
Player is inducted in the Hockey Hall of Fame
Player is not yet eligible for the Hockey Hall of Fame

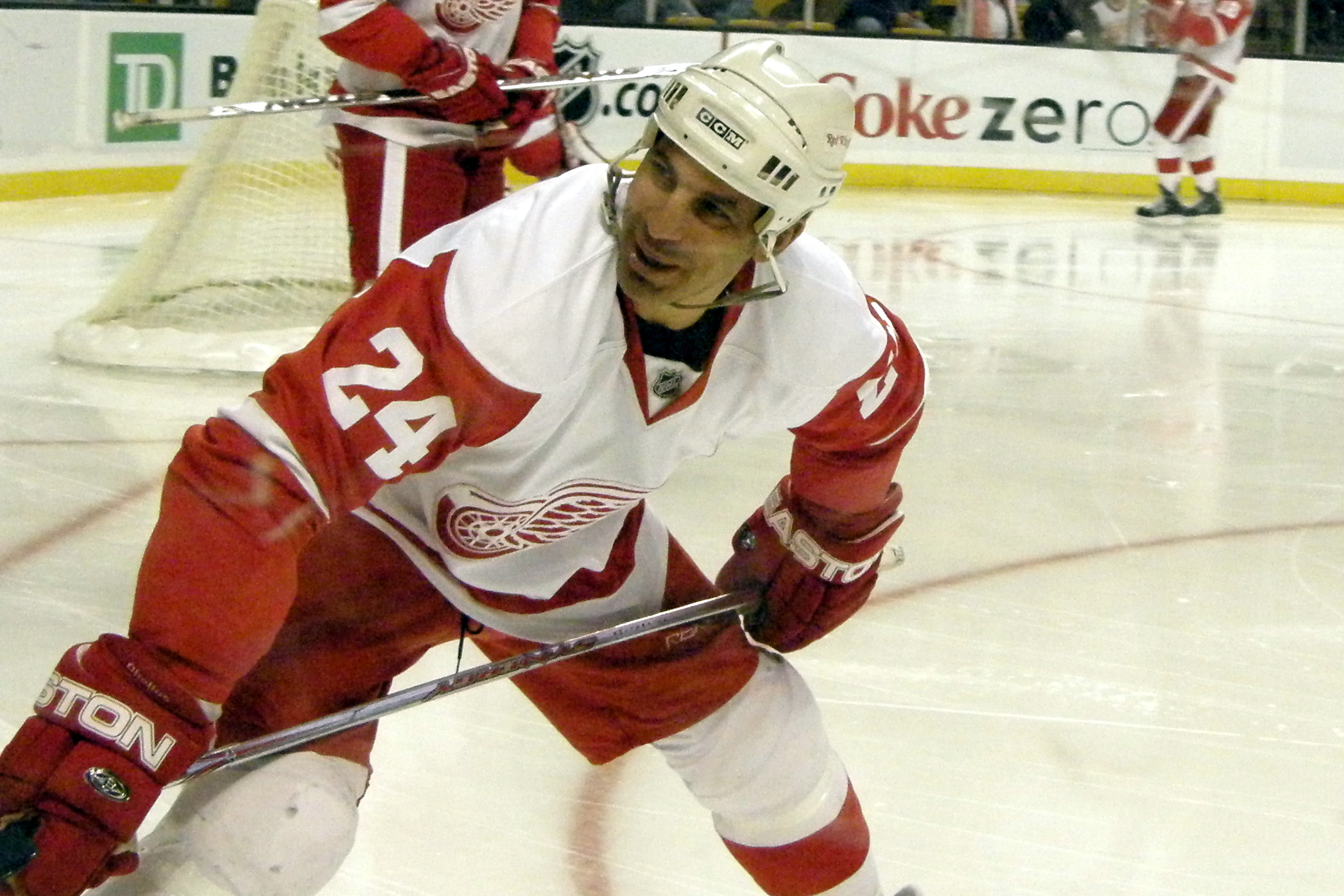
Chris Chelios, the first winner of the annual award in 2007.

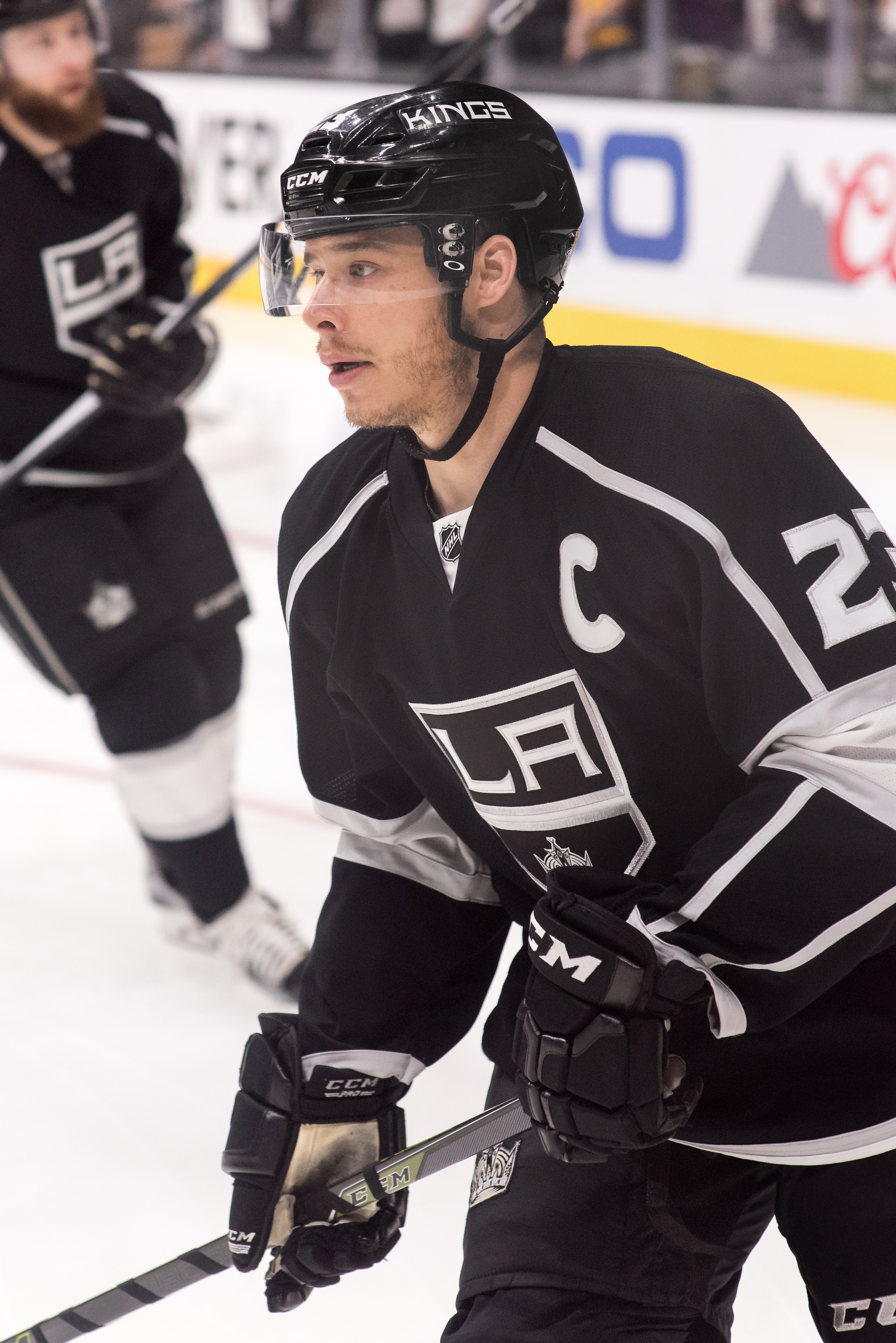
Dustin Brown, winner in 2014.

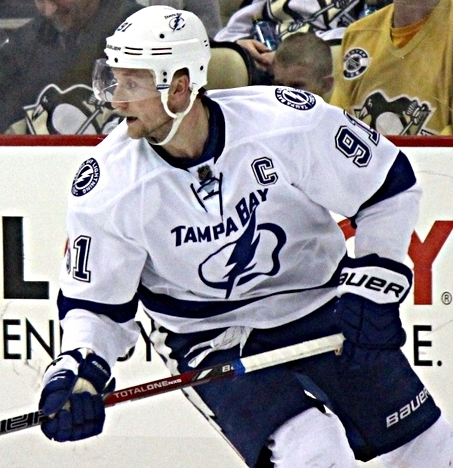
Steven Stamkos, winner in 2023.

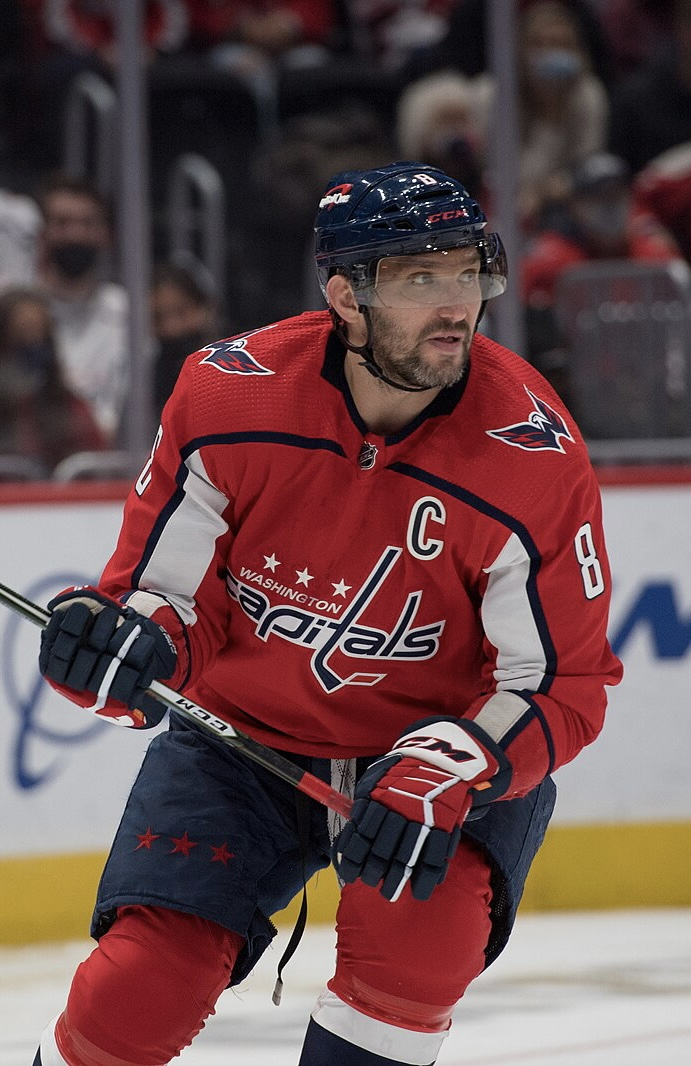
Alexander Ovechkin, winner in 2025.

=== 2006–07 Monthly Award ===
Month	Winner	Team	Position	#
November	Brendan Shanahan	New York Rangers	LW	1
December	Scott Niedermayer	Anaheim Ducks	D	1
January	Sidney Crosby	Pittsburgh Penguins	C	1
February	Vincent Lecavalier	Tampa Bay Lightning	C	1
March	Roberto Luongo	Vancouver Canucks	G	1

=== 2007–present ===
Year	Winner	Team	Position	#
2006–07	Chris Chelios	Detroit Red Wings	D	1
2007–08	Mats Sundin	Toronto Maple Leafs	C	1
2008–09	Jarome Iginla	Calgary Flames	RW	1
2009–10	Sidney Crosby	Pittsburgh Penguins	C	2^{1}
2010–11	Zdeno Chara	Boston Bruins	D	1
2011–12	Shane Doan	Phoenix Coyotes	RW	1
2012–13	Daniel Alfredsson	Ottawa Senators	RW	1
2013–14	Dustin Brown	Los Angeles Kings	RW	1
2014–15	Jonathan Toews	Chicago Blackhawks	C	1
2015–16	Shea Weber	Nashville Predators	D	1
2016–17	Nick Foligno	Columbus Blue Jackets	LW	1
2017–18	Deryk Engelland	Vegas Golden Knights	D	1
2018–19	Wayne Simmonds	Philadelphia Flyers/Nashville Predators	RW	1
2019–20	Mark Giordano	Calgary Flames	D	1
2020–21	Patrice Bergeron	Boston Bruins	C	1
2021–22	Anze Kopitar	Los Angeles Kings	C	1
2022–23	Steven Stamkos	Tampa Bay Lightning	C	1
2023–24	Jacob Trouba	New York Rangers	D	1
2024–25	Alexander Ovechkin	Washington Capitals	LW	1
2025–26	Gabriel Landeskog	Colorado Avalanche	LW	1

=== Notes ===
1. Crosby previously won the monthly award in January 2007.

== See also ==
- List of National Hockey League awards
