= HYX =

HYX or HyX may refer to:

- HYX, abbreviation for Hengyuanxiang Group, an official sponsor in 2022 Winter Olympics marketing
- HYX, musician in 2013 single TR0NCE by Alvin Risk
- HyX, biopharmaceutical platform by Nuvelo
- HYX Editions, publisher used by Timothée Chaillou
- HYX, revoked IATA code for Saginaw County H.W. Browne Airport
