= Mark Messier =

Canadian ice hockey player (born 1961)

OC Mark Messier
- Hockey Hall of Fame, 2007
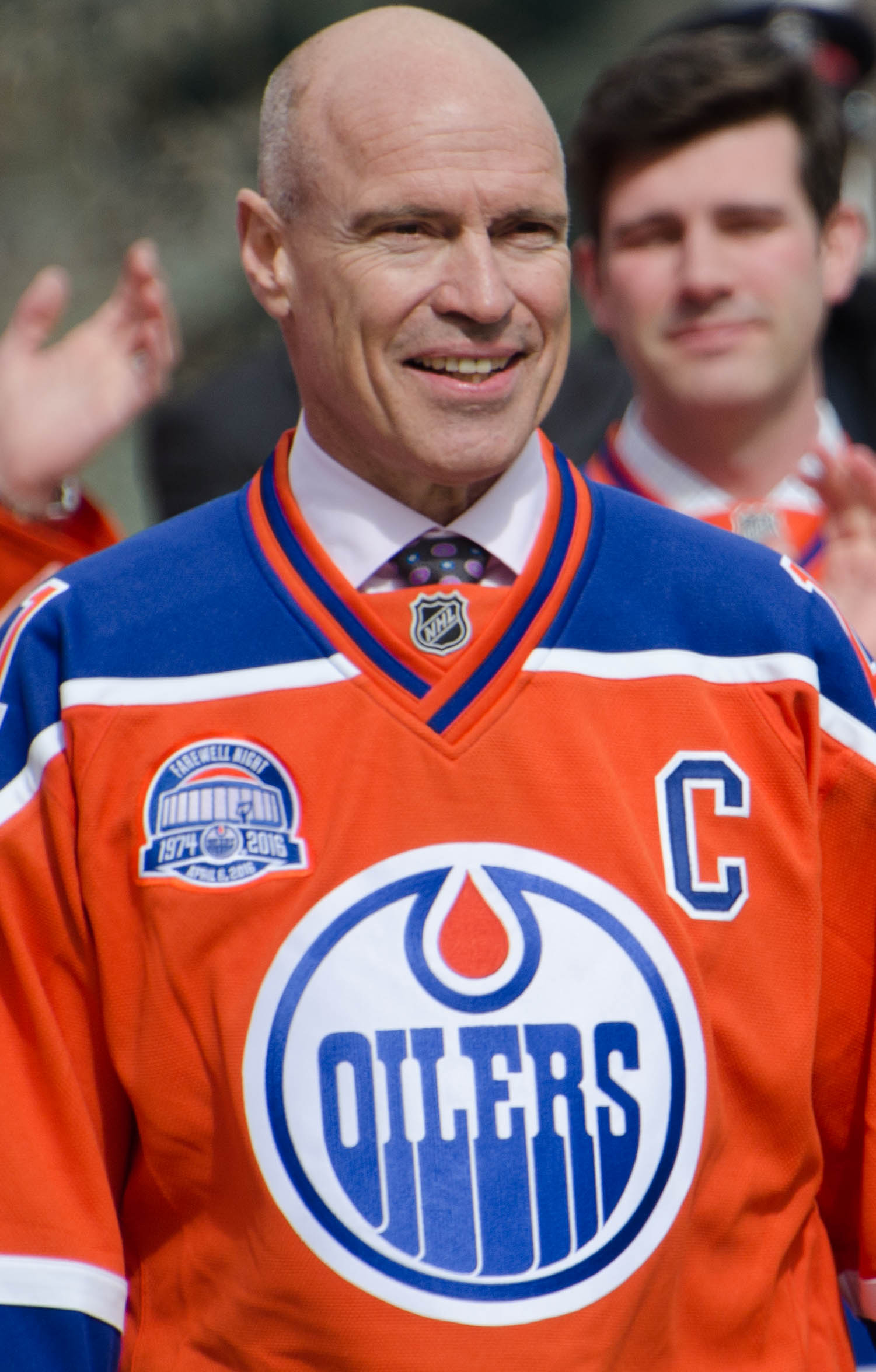
- Messier in 2016
- Born: January 18, 1961 (age 65) St. Albert, Alberta, Canada
- Height: 6 ft 2 in (188 cm)
- Weight: 211 lb (96 kg; 15 st 1 lb)
- Position: Forward
- Played for: Indianapolis Racers; Cincinnati Stingers; Edmonton Oilers; New York Rangers; Vancouver Canucks
- National team: Canada
- NHL draft: 48th overall, 1979; Edmonton Oilers
- Playing career: 1978–2004
Medal record
Men's ice hockey
Representing Canada
Canada Cup
Gold medal – first place	1984 Canada
Gold medal – first place	1987 Canada
Gold medal – first place	1991 Canada
World Championships
Silver medal – second place	1989 Sweden

Mark John Douglas Messier OC (/ˈmɛsieɪ/; born January 18, 1961) is a Canadian former professional ice hockey forward. His playing career in the National Hockey League (NHL) lasted 25 seasons (1979–2004) with the Edmonton Oilers, New York Rangers and Vancouver Canucks. He also played professionally with the World Hockey Association (WHA)'s Indianapolis Racers and Cincinnati Stingers. He also played a short four-game stint in the original Central Hockey League (CHL) with the Houston Apollos in 1979. He was the last WHA player to be active in professional ice hockey and the last active player in any of the major North American professional sports leagues to have played in the 1970s. After his playing career, he was special assistant to the president and general manager of the Rangers.

Messier is considered one of the greatest ice hockey players of all time. He is second on the all-time list for playoff points (295) and third for regular season games played (1756) and regular season points (1887). He is a six-time Stanley Cup champion—five with the Oilers and one with the Rangers—and is the only player to captain two teams to Stanley Cup championships. His playoff leadership during his first stint with the Rangers, which ended a 54-year Stanley Cup drought in 1994, earned him the nickname "The Messiah", a play on his name. He was also known, throughout his career, as "The Moose" for his aggression and strength. He twice won the Hart Memorial Trophy as the league's most valuable player, in 1990 and 1992 and in 1984 won the Conn Smythe Trophy as the most valuable player during the playoffs. He was selected for the NHL All-Star Game sixteen times. In 2007, he was inducted into the Hockey Hall of Fame, in his first year of eligibility. In 2017, Messier was named one of the "100 Greatest NHL Players" in history.

On June 30, 2017, he was named an Officer of the Order of Canada by Governor General David Johnston for "contributions to hockey as an outstanding player and captain and for his leadership in encouraging children to take up the sport."

== Early life ==
Messier was born in St. Albert, Alberta, the son of Mary-Jean (Dea) and Doug Messier. He was the second son and third child of four; his siblings are Paul, Mary-Kay and Jennifer. The Messier family moved to Portland, Oregon when Mark was young, where Doug played for the Portland Buckaroos of the minor pro Western Hockey League. The family returned to St. Albert in 1969 after Doug retired from hockey. Messier attended St. Francis Xavier High School in Edmonton as he played junior hockey where Doug was his coach and mentor for his early years.

Messier's brother Paul was drafted by the Colorado Rockies 41st overall in the 1978 NHL Amateur Draft, but he only played nine games with the club in 1978–79 before embarking on a long career in the German Eishockey-Bundesliga. Paul helps manage a hotel that Messier owns in Harbour Island, Bahamas. Messier's cousins Mitch and Joby also skated for NHL clubs. Joby was briefly Mark's teammate on the Rangers.

== Playing career ==
=== Early years and WHA ===
In 1976, Messier tried out for the junior Spruce Grove Mets of the Alberta Junior Hockey League (AJHL), where his father, Doug Messier, was coaching. As Messier was only 15 (the age limit was 20), Doug did not expect him to make the team, though he was surprised and was added to the roster. Messier recorded 66 points in 57 games with the Mets in the 1976–77 season. The team, which relocated to St. Albert the following season and was renamed the St. Albert Saints, named Messier captain for 1977–78 and he scored 74 points in 54 games. After the season he joined the Portland Winterhawks of the major junior Western Hockey League (WHL) for the playoffs, appearing in 7 games and scoring 5 points.

Before the start of the 1978–79 season, Messier was looking for alternatives to another season with the Saints, as he felt he was too good for the AJHL. He was not interested in playing in the WHL, so he initially tried out for the Canadian Olympic team, which was preparing for the 1980 Winter Olympics. At the same time, Doug contacted his former junior teammate Pat Stapleton, who was coaching of the Indianapolis Racers of the World Hockey Association (WHA), who needed someone to replace another young player they had just traded, Wayne Gretzky. Doug called him and got Messier a contract to play hockey in Indianapolis for $30,000. However Messier only took a 5-game amateur tryout, as it would allow him to return to junior hockey if need be.

Messier played 13 games with the Saints to start the season, then joined the Racers on November 5 for his professional debut against the Winnipeg Jets. He played four games with the Racers, followed by a further two more with the Saints, before his final game with Indianapolis on November 28. Offered a longer contract, Messier held off on signing it, which proved fortuitous as the team folded on December 15; his only cheque from them bounced. Returning to the Saints, Messier played his final two games of junior hockey for them before he was signed by the Cincinnati Stingers, also of the WHA. Messier signed a contract for $35,000 to play the rest of the season with the Stingers. He scored his first professional goal on March 20, 1979, against Pat Riggin of the Birmingham Bulls. According to Stingers teammate Paul Stewart, the goal was accidental: “He flipped it in from near center ice and the puck took a bad bounce and went in the net. Messier had returned to the bench. He didn’t even know he had scored.” Messier played 47 games for the Stingers, tallying one goal and 10 assists.

=== Edmonton Oilers (1979–1991) ===
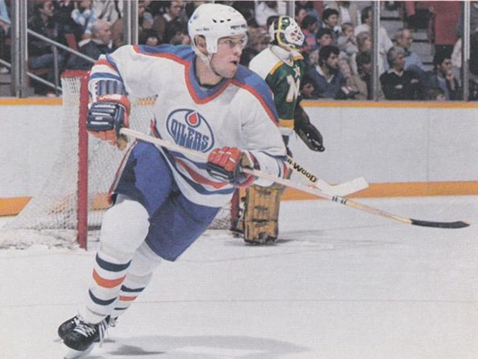
Messier in action with the Edmonton Oilers c. 1983

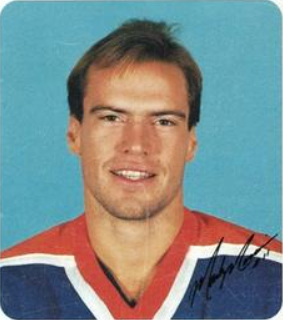
1985 card of Messier

The WHA folded after the conclusion of the 1978–79 season and four of the six remaining teams were admitted into the NHL; both the Stingers and the Bulls were not included in the merger and instead joined the minor Central Hockey League. The players were dispersed to teams that had already owned their NHL rights, or were allowed to enter the 1979 NHL entry draft; being under 20 years old, Messier was eligible for the draft and was selected in the third round, 48th overall, by the Edmonton Oilers. He refused the Oilers' initial contract offers, a four-year two-way contract or one year at $20,000 plus an option for a second year, instead wanting four years at $50,000 per year, but ultimately signed what the Oilers offered.

During his first year in the NHL, Messier had several discipline issues and at the end of October, he missed a team flight and was subsequently reassigned to their CHL affiliate, the Houston Apollos, for four games. On returning to Edmonton, Messier moved back in with his parents, living at their St. Albert home.

For most of Messier's tenure with the Oilers, he played on a line with Glenn Anderson. Messier was a fierce, tough competitor whose intense leadership in the dressing room was as important as the goals he scored on the ice. He was not initially known as a scorer, but his offensive numbers increased steadily over his first few years with the Oilers. In 1981–82, he registered his only 50-goal season. In the 1982 playoffs, the Oilers lost to the underdog Los Angeles Kings in five games; during game three (nicknamed the "Miracle on Manchester") which went to overtime after the Kings completed a comeback from being down 5–0, Messier missed a wide-open net when goaltender Mario Lessard was out of position, then Messier lost a face-off to Doug Smith who setup Daryl Evans for the sudden-death winning goal.

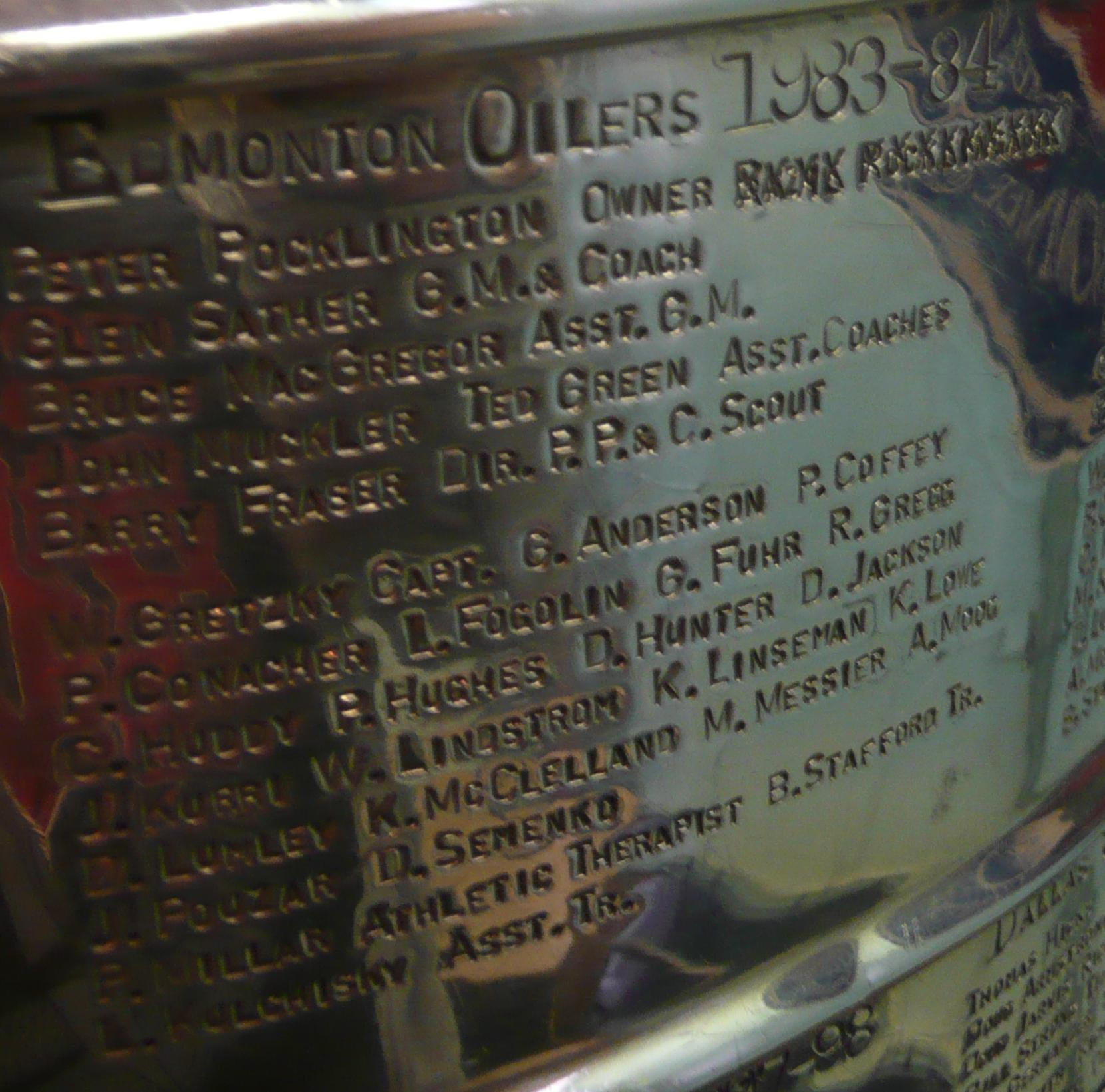
Messier's name engraved on the Stanley Cup, as a part of the 1983–84 Edmonton Oilers.

Initially a left-winger (he was named to the NHL First All-Star Team in 1982–83 on the left wing), Messier switched to centre in the 1984 playoffs and the results were spectacular. Advancing to the 1984 Final to earn a rematch with the four-time defending champion New York Islanders, the Oilers had trouble scoring in games 1 and 2, a 1–0 win and a 6–1 loss, respectively, although the Oilers still managed to split the games thanks to the physicality of Messier and Kevin McClelland. In game three, with his Oilers trailing the Islanders 2–1, it was Messier beating the defensive pair of Denis Potvin and Gord Dineen to score on a brilliant end-to-end rush that not only tied the game, but sparked a 7–2 victory for the Oilers to give them a 2–1 series lead, thus Messier's goal was considered the turning point in the series. The Oilers went on to win games 4 and 5 by scores of 7–2 and 5–2, respectively and where Wayne Gretzky scored his first goals of the series, to capture their first Stanley Cup. Messier was awarded the Conn Smythe Trophy as the most valuable player of the playoffs.

In 1984, Messier was suspended for ten games for cracking Jamie Macoun's cheekbone with a sucker punch from behind during a game against the Calgary Flames on December 26. Messier was retaliating for having been boarded by Macoun earlier in the game, but the NHL ruled that he had instigated the fight.

On September 6, 1985, Messier lost control of his Porsche and totaled it by hitting three parked cars. He was later charged with hit and run and careless driving, for which he paid a fine.

He won four more Cups with the Oilers, 1985, 1987, 1988 and 1990, for the last of which he captained the Oilers to a five-game victory over the Boston Bruins. Though the Oilers had been a 1980s powerhouse, the 1990 victory, which came two years after Wayne Gretzky was traded away, surprised many. Messier also won the Hart Memorial Trophy as league MVP that season, edging out the Bruins' Ray Bourque by just two votes, the narrowest margin in the award's history.

Though Messier was actually under contract to the Oilers until 1993, his agent and father Doug Messier unsuccessfully pressed Oilers president and general manager Glen Sather for a new deal in the summer of 1990. After the 1990–91 season, Messier was upset that the Oilers were willing to let Adam Graves leave the team. Messier issued a public trade demand during the Canada Cup tournament saying that he wanted out if the Oilers were not willing to do what was necessary to keep important players. On October 4, 1991, in one of many cost-cutting moves by Edmonton management, Messier was traded to the New York Rangers for Louie DeBrusk, Bernie Nicholls and Steven Rice.

=== New York Rangers (1991–1997) ===
In his first season with the Rangers, Messier won his second Hart Trophy and guided the Rangers to the best record in the NHL. However, they were ousted in six games in the second round of the playoffs by the eventual champions Pittsburgh Penguins.

In 1992–93, the Rangers missed the playoffs; it was the first time in Messier's career that he did not play in the postseason. After the season, Mike Keenan was hired as head coach.

==== 1993–94 season ====
In the 1993–94 NHL season, the Rangers rebounded to once again finish first overall and this time were expected to win the Cup. After easily ousting the Islanders and Capitals in the first two rounds, the Rangers' road to the Cup would get a lot harder.

Down 3–2 in the series before game six of the 1994 Eastern Conference Final against the rival New Jersey Devils, Messier confronted the New York media and publicly guaranteed a game six victory. With fans and players on both sides reading the news headline, it then became a feat comparable to Babe Ruth's called shot and Joe Namath's Super Bowl III guarantee and he backed it up by scoring a natural hat trick in the third period on an empty net goal with ESPN play-by-play commentator Gary Thorne boasting, "Do you believe it? Do you believe it? He said we will win game six and he has just picked up the hat trick!" It helped the Rangers erase a 2–0 deficit to win 4–2. The Rangers went on to win the series in a thrilling seventh game double overtime nailbiter.

In the Stanley Cup Final, Messier scored the Stanley Cup-winning goal in game seven at Madison Square Garden, giving the Rangers their first Stanley Cup in 54 years. He became the first (and to this date, the only) player to captain two teams to the Stanley Cup, something his former teammate Wayne Gretzky could not do the year before and provided two of the most memorable images of that Stanley Cup Final. First, when the buzzer sounded he was jumping up and down with overwhelming emotion as ticker tape fell; fireworks burst and fans and teammates celebrated. The other, which would become an iconic image to the Rangers and their fans, taken by George Kalinsky, photographer at Madison Square Garden, showing incredible emotion as he accepted the Stanley Cup from NHL Commissioner Gary Bettman. Finally, during the ticker-tape parade celebrating the Rangers' win, Rudy Giuliani, witnessing his first New York sports team championship victory just five months after becoming mayor, dubbed Messier "Mr. June," conjuring Reggie Jackson's "Mr. October" nickname.

==== 1995 to 1997 ====
In 1995–96, Messier came as close as he had since 1991–92 to break the 100-point plateau when, at the age of 35, he recorded a 99-point season. In 1996–97, former Oilers teammate Wayne Gretzky joined the Rangers, while Messier retained the captaincy and had a respectable 84-point regular season. The two led the team to the Eastern Conference Final, where they were eliminated by the Philadelphia Flyers in five games, as the Rangers could not match the size and strength of Eric Lindros and his "Legion of Doom" linemates. This would turn out to be both players' final playoff appearances. Messier left the club after the season (see below), ending the brief reunion of Messier and Gretzky being together again on the same team after just one season.

Messier had wanted to finish his career with the Rangers but Dave Checketts, the president of Madison Square Garden, said the team did not think Messier was worth US$20 million for the next three years, though Messier maintained that he would have signed a one-year contract extension for under $6 million per season. Although public sentiment sided with Messier, as he led the team to two first-place regular season finishes and the Stanley Cup, general manager Neil Smith was content having Gretzky and Pat LaFontaine as top centremen and he came close to landing Joe Sakic from the Colorado Avalanche when he signed him to an offer sheet in the summer of 1997. (The Avalanche matched the offer and Sakic remained in Colorado for the remainder of his career.)

Smith's decision to keep Gretzky and LaFontaine backfired, as LaFontaine would suffer a career-ending concussion during the 1997–98 season and Gretzky would retire after the following season.

=== Vancouver Canucks (1997–2000) ===
At 36 years old, Messier signed with the Vancouver Canucks to a high-priced free-agent contract. The Canucks desired a star centreman to play alongside Pavel Bure, having earlier made an unsuccessful pitch to Wayne Gretzky, before attracting Messier. Messier's return to Canada after six years with the Rangers was a high-profile but brief event.

Messier's image with Canucks fans was tarnished due to his demand to receive the number No. 11, which he had worn throughout his career with the Oilers and Rangers, but which the Canucks had unofficially retired after Wayne Maki's unexpected death in 1974. Canucks management allowed Messier to wear the number over the protest of Maki's family.

Before the season started, incumbent captain and fan favorite Trevor Linden was pressured to relinquish the captaincy to Messier, a move that did not go over well with Canucks supporters, as just a few years prior Linden had almost led the underdog Canucks to upset Messier's Rangers in the 1994 Cup Final, as well as Messier's time with the Oilers where they defeated the Canucks in the playoffs every time they met. Amidst a turbulent season, in which president and general manager Pat Quinn and head coach Tom Renney were fired, Mike Keenan was hired as the new head coach and acting general manager reportedly at Messier's request. It was widely believed that Messier told team ownership that he wanted full control of the dressing room, which involved bringing in Keenan with his authoritarian player management style that grated upon existing Canucks players from the Quinn era. Instead of mediating between the head coach and players, Messier always sided with Keenan, causing many of these veteran Canucks to leave in free agency or be traded away. Keenan eventually traded Linden to the New York Islanders, where he became their captain, replacing Bryan McCabe, for whom Linden was traded along with Todd Bertuzzi. Canucks fans were outraged by the trade and in Linden's first return to Vancouver after being traded, he received a standing ovation while Messier was booed. These moves, along with Messier's sub-par on-ice performances, have led to him being regarded as "undoubtedly the most hated player in the history of the Canucks".

In Messier's first game back on Broadway, MSG provided a video for him which was displayed on the big screen at the Garden. It was very emotional as some fans as well as Messier himself shed tears. He went on to score a goal in that game against his former team where he received applause after doing so even though he wore a different uniform. One fan displayed a sign that read, "You will always be our captain Mess."

Sixty points in 1997–98 was his worst mark in a full year since his first NHL season; his next two seasons were shortened by injury and finished with 158 points over three years, considered below expectations compared to other star centremen earning around $6 million US a season, like Steve Yzerman and Joe Sakic. Messier was still expected to be named to the Canadian men's hockey team for the 1998 Olympics, in which the NHL allowed its best players to participate for the first time; however, he was surprisingly omitted by general manager Bobby Clarke.

Brian Burke was hired as general manager in June 1998. Keenan, who had to cede the personnel decisions to Burke, was fired from his post as Canucks' head coach midway through the 1998–99 season, as the club missed the playoffs during Messier's three years. With most of the players from the Quinn era gone and a new nucleus of young players, Messier's leadership was now viewed positively and he received praise for being a "father figure" to them. Nonetheless, the team did not attempt to re-sign Messier and he became a free agent after the 1999–2000 season.

Vancouver Canucks assistant general manager Dave Nonis said of Messier; "Mark was such a strong leader that everyone followed in behind him and relied on his ability to lead the team, which is fine because that's what he was here to do. Mess was such a dominant personality, players felt they didn't have to do those things... In some respects, it repressed the leadership ability of some other guys. With him gone, some guys will flourish in that department."

=== Return to New York Rangers (2000–2004) ===
Meanwhile, back in New York, the Rangers had fired Neil Smith as general manager in March 2000 following three consecutive non-playoff seasons. Smith's successor was Messier's former general manager and head coach in Edmonton, Glen Sather, who began negotiating with the veteran former team captain and Messier agreed to terms to return to Madison Square Garden for the 2000–01 season. To mark Messier's return to the Rangers, a press conference was called to announce the signing; during the gathering, Messier's successor as captain, Brian Leetch, ceded the captaincy to his returning teammate and, in a conciliatory gesture, a hatchet was buried in the dirt. Messier also went one step further and guaranteed that the Rangers would return to the playoffs.

Messier's 67-point season as a 40-year-old in 2000–01 was a mark better than any he established in his Vancouver years, showing that he could still be a valuable presence, but the Rangers missed the playoffs for the fourth year running. After missing half of 2001–02 due to an arm injury, Messier recorded only 23 points and finished up next year with a 40-point season.

On June 30, 2003, Messier's rights were traded to the San Jose Sharks for a fourth-round draft pick. This draft pick ended up being used to select Rochester, New York native and future Rangers captain Ryan Callahan. The Sharks held his rights for just a few hours as he would eventually go on to re-sign with the Rangers as a free agent.

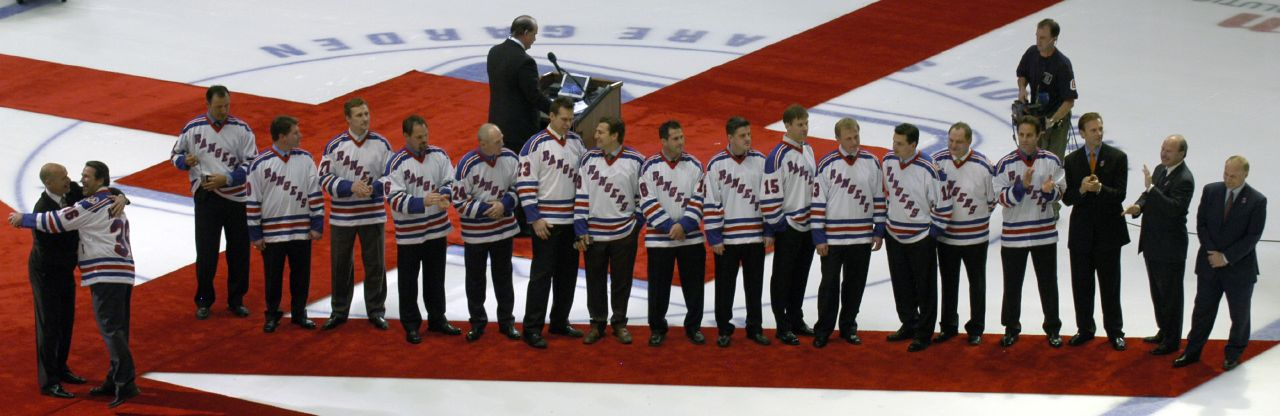
Messier (left foreground) during his number retirement ceremony with the New York Rangers. The ceremony was held in January 2006, several months after he retired.

On November 4, 2003, against the Dallas Stars, Messier scored a pair of goals to vault past Gordie Howe into second on the all-time point scoring list with 1,851 points, second-most in League history trailing only Wayne Gretzky. Eleven days later, Messier was the only active player to play in the Legends Game at Edmonton's Heritage Classic, suiting up with the Oiler alumni. During his last game at Madison Square Garden (a 4–3 loss to the Buffalo Sabres on March 31, 2004), Messier received applause every time he touched the puck and, after the game, received a standing ovation while he skated around the Garden and bowed to every section of the stands. At the age of 43, most media outlets believed Messier had decided to retire. The NHL lockout eliminated the next season. All speculation ended on September 12, 2005, when he announced his retirement on ESPN Radio.

Messier retired eleven games behind Howe's then-NHL record 1,767 regular season games played. Messier holds the record for most NHL regular season and playoff season games played at 1,992. Messier is one of a handful of players to have played 25 NHL seasons.

=== International career ===
Messier only played with Canada once outside North America, winning the silver medal at the 1989 World Championships in Sweden. He also won three consecutive Canada Cups and played for the Canadian team that finished second at the 1996 World Cup of Hockey, four tournaments which he described as "my real opportunity to play international hockey."

== Post-playing career ==
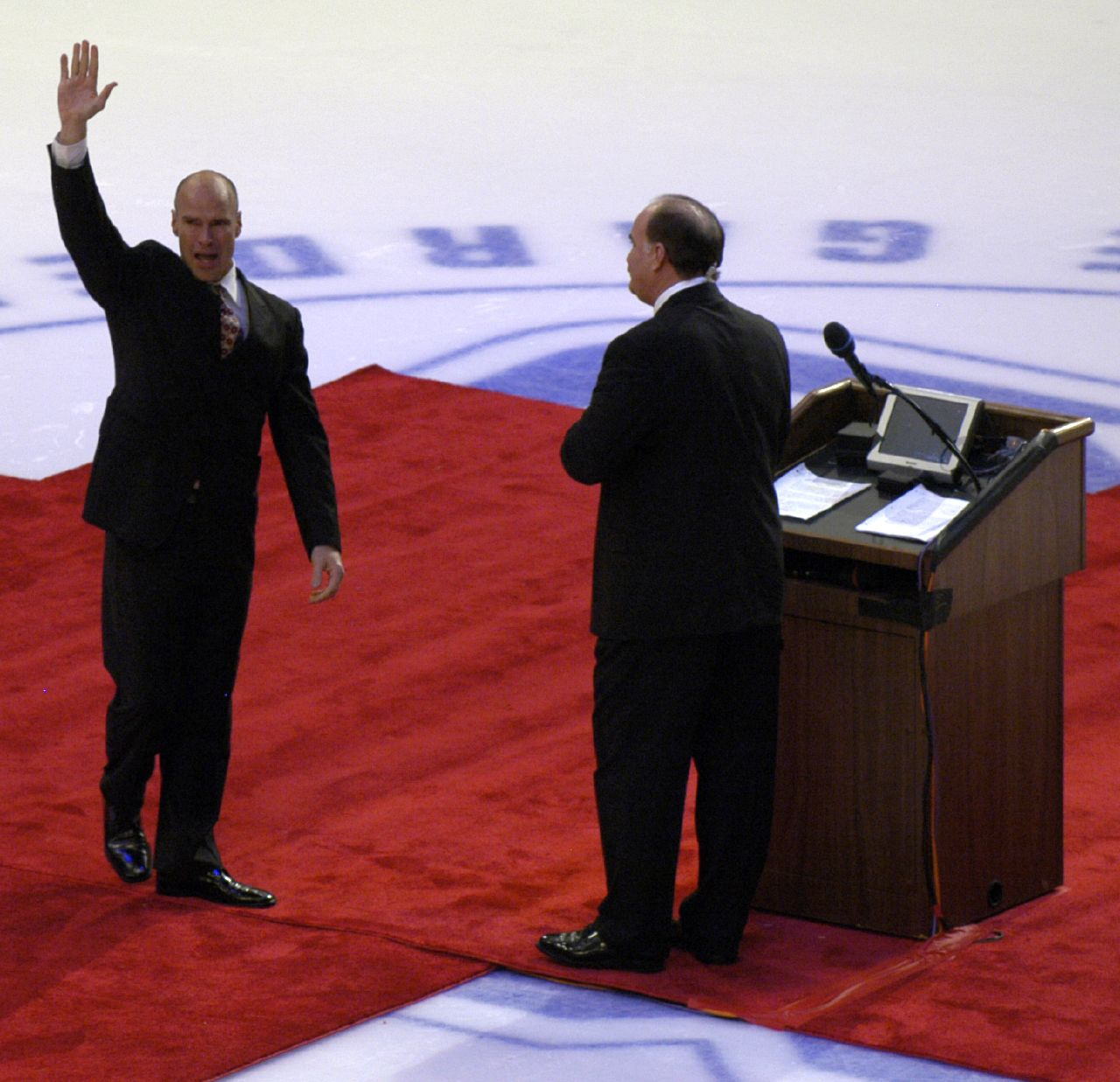
Retirement of Mark Messier, January 12, 2006

On January 12, 2006, during a very emotional ceremony that featured most of the 1994 Stanley Cup team and the Stanley Cup itself, the New York Rangers retired his number 11 in a game against the Edmonton Oilers. During the game, the Rangers defeated the Oilers. His is the 4th number retired by the Rangers. His number was retired by the Edmonton Oilers on February 27, 2007, against the Phoenix Coyotes, then coached by former teammate Wayne Gretzky.

In February 2007, Messier publicly expressed interest in returning to the NHL as general manager for the Rangers; however, the then-current general manager Glen Sather responded by saying he had no plans of stepping down from his position. With the departure of assistant general manager Don Maloney from the Rangers organization in May 2007, Messier's name had been attached to possible replacements; however, in July 2007, Jim Schoenfeld was announced as Maloney's replacement. On November 12, 2007, Messier was inducted into the Hockey Hall of Fame in the players category.

In late 2010, Messier coached Canada during two European tournaments—the Deutschland Cup and the Spengler Cup.

Messier also awards the NHL's Mark Messier Leadership Award, given to a player who exemplifies on-ice leadership and leadership within their communities.

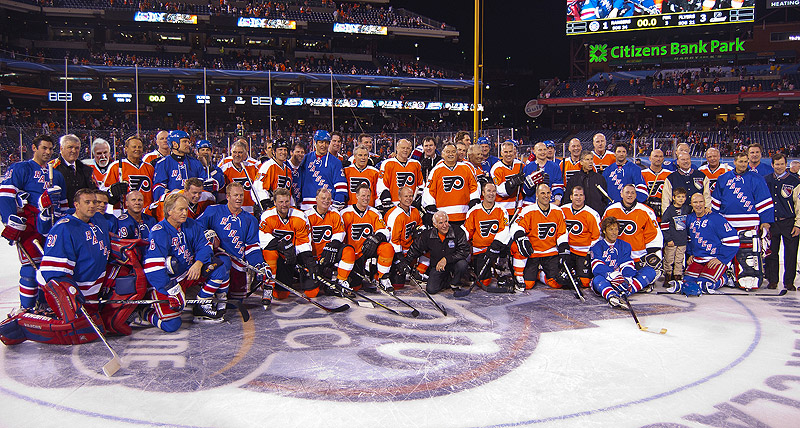
Messier alongside other former Rangers and Philadelphia Flyers during the 2012 NHL Winter Classic alumni game.

Messier also remained active in the City of New York during the 2010s, with Messier playing for the New York Rangers at the 2012 NHL Winter Classic Alumni Game in Philadelphia between the New York Rangers and the Philadelphia Flyers on December 31, 2011. Messier had 1 assist during the game, which was won 3–1 by Philadelphia. Messier also ran in the New York City Marathon on November 6, 2011, finishing with a time of 4:14:21. Messier, alongside Sarah Hughes, is also involved in the construction of the Kingsbridge National Ice Center, a US$250 million, 795,000 square foot redevelopment of the Kingsbridge Armory in the Bronx into a world's-largest indoor ice facility, containing nine ice rinks.

After his retirement, Messier appeared in a Versus television special in the United States highlighting his "Mark Messier Leadership Camp," which allowed New Yorkers to mix seminars in leadership and working with others with hockey games against former Rangers, including a scrimmage at Madison Square Garden. Messier occasionally worked as a studio analyst on NHL on Versus, served as an in-game analyst for The NHL All-Star Game on Versus and has been a guest commentator on NHL on NBC. In 2014, Messier joined Rogers Communications as a spokesperson and occasional analyst for the company's national NHL coverage. He appeared on various Rogers NHL GameCentre Live advertisements including the Vancouver Canucks-themed ad which drew backlash towards their fanbase. In 2021, Messier signed a deal with ESPN/ABC to lead their new look studio coverage, as ESPN and ABC will air NHL games for the first time in 17 years.

Messier was featured in a Lay's chips campaign that aired in Canada in the late 1990s and early 2000s. The commercials originally featured Messier being challenged to a bet by a local hockey fan, who bets that Messier cannot eat just one potato chip, about the Lay's slogan "bet you can't eat just one." Messier loses the bet and ends up playing in a local "beer league" hockey game (for a team called "The Pylons"), which he easily dominates. Later variations would have Messier himself making the same bet. He was also featured in Lay's ads in the U.S. where he asked neighbours to borrow ice, sugar, or a hairdryer (playing on his bald head) to get chips.

== Personal life ==
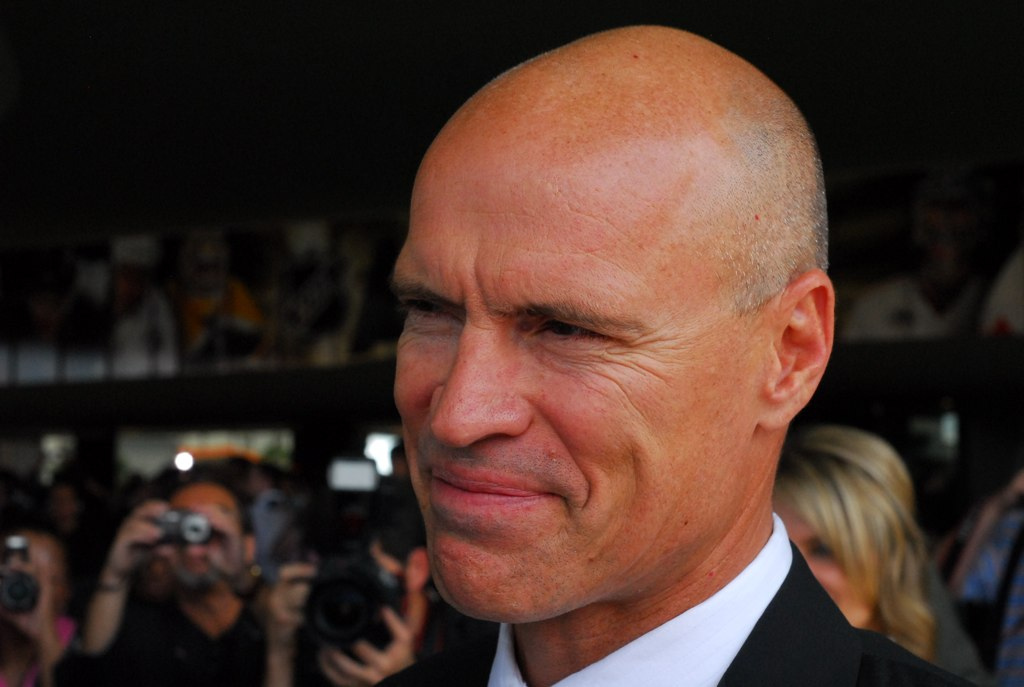
Messier in 2009.

Messier's son Lyon was born on August 16, 1987, and is a former defenceman who spent part of two seasons with the South Carolina Stingrays of the ECHL and both the Charlotte Checkers and New Mexico Scorpions of the Central Hockey League. Messier and his wife, Kim, have a second son and a daughter.

Messier owns the Runaway Hill Club on the pink sand beach on Harbour Island in the Bahamas.

Messier is an advocate for preventative healthcare and was a spokesperson for Cold-fX.

== Career statistics ==
=== Regular season and playoffs ===
			Regular season					Playoffs
Season	Team	League	GP	G	A	Pts	PIM	GP	G	A	Pts	PIM
1975–76	Sherwood Spears	AMHL	44	82	76	158	38	—	—	—	—	—
1976–77	Spruce Grove Mets	AJHL	57	27	39	66	91	—	—	—	—	—
1977–78	St. Albert Saints	AJHL	54	25	49	74	194	—	—	—	—	—
1977–78	Portland Winter Hawks	WCHL	—	—	—	—	—	7	4	1	5	2
1978–79	St. Albert Saints	AJHL	17	15	18	33	64	—	—	—	—	—
1978–79	Indianapolis Racers	WHA	5	0	0	0	0	—	—	—	—	—
1978–79	Cincinnati Stingers	WHA	47	1	10	11	58	3	0	0	0	0
1979–80	Houston Apollos	CHL	4	0	3	3	4	—	—	—	—	—
1979–80	Edmonton Oilers	NHL	75	12	21	33	120	3	1	2	3	2
1980–81	Edmonton Oilers	NHL	72	23	40	63	102	9	2	5	7	13
1981–82	Edmonton Oilers	NHL	78	50	38	88	119	5	1	2	3	8
1982–83	Edmonton Oilers	NHL	77	48	58	106	72	15	15	6	21	14
1983–84	Edmonton Oilers	NHL	73	37	64	101	165	19	8	18	26	19
1984–85	Edmonton Oilers	NHL	55	23	31	54	57	18	12	13	25	12
1985–86	Edmonton Oilers	NHL	63	35	49	84	70	10	4	6	10	18
1986–87	Edmonton Oilers	NHL	71	37	70	107	73	21	12	16	28	16
1987–88	Edmonton Oilers	NHL	70	37	74	111	103	19	11	23	34	29
1988–89	Edmonton Oilers	NHL	72	33	61	94	130	7	1	11	12	8
1989–90	Edmonton Oilers	NHL	79	45	84	129	79	22	9	22	31	20
1990–91	Edmonton Oilers	NHL	53	12	52	64	34	18	4	11	15	16
1991–92	New York Rangers	NHL	79	35	72	107	76	11	7	7	14	6
1992–93	New York Rangers	NHL	75	25	66	91	72	—	—	—	—	—
1993–94	New York Rangers	NHL	76	26	58	84	76	23	12	18	30	33
1994–95	New York Rangers	NHL	46	14	39	53	40	10	3	10	13	8
1995–96	New York Rangers	NHL	74	47	52	99	122	11	4	7	11	16
1996–97	New York Rangers	NHL	71	36	48	84	88	15	3	9	12	6
1997–98	Vancouver Canucks	NHL	82	22	38	60	58	—	—	—	—	—
1998–99	Vancouver Canucks	NHL	59	13	35	48	33	—	—	—	—	—
1999–2000	Vancouver Canucks	NHL	66	17	37	54	30	—	—	—	—	—
2000–01	New York Rangers	NHL	82	24	43	67	89	—	—	—	—	—
2001–02	New York Rangers	NHL	41	7	16	23	32	—	—	—	—	—
2002–03	New York Rangers	NHL	78	18	22	40	30	—	—	—	—	—
2003–04	New York Rangers	NHL	76	18	25	43	42	—	—	—	—	—
WHA totals			52	1	10	11	58	3	0	0	0	0
NHL totals			1,756	694	1,193	1,887	1,912	236	109	186	295	244

== Awards and honours ==
Award	Year(s)
NHL All-Star Game	1982, 1983, 1984, 1986, 1988, 1989, 1990, 1991, 1992, 1993, 1994, 1996, 1997, 1998, 2000, 2004
NHL First All-Star Team	1982, (Note: Played as left winger) 1983, 1990, (Note: Played as centre) 1992
Stanley Cup champion	1984, 1985, 1987, 1988, 1990, 1994
Conn Smythe Trophy	1984
NHL Second All-Star Team	1984
Hart Memorial Trophy	1990, 1992
Lester B. Pearson Award	1990, 1992
One of 100 Greatest NHL Players	2017

== Career achievements ==
- The only player to have captained two Stanley Cup championship teams, the Edmonton Oilers and New York Rangers.
- In 1998, he was ranked number 12 on The Hockey News' list of the 100 Greatest Hockey Players.
- On November 13, 2006, the National Hockey League created the Mark Messier Leadership Award, given to an individual in the sport who leads by example on the ice, motivates his teammates and is dedicated to community activities and charitable causes.
- His 1,887 points in the regular season are third all-time to Jaromír Jágr and Wayne Gretzky's 2857 (alongside whom he played for 11 seasons). Despite this feat, Messier never won a scoring title, as his best finish was runner-up in 1989–90. His career-high for regular season goals was 50, which he accomplished just once in 1981–82.
- His 1,756 regular season NHL games played are third most all-time to Gordie Howe and Patrick Marleau who played in 1,767 and 1,779 regular season NHL games, respectively. He played in the most combined regular season and playoff games, with 1,992 total games.
- He was the last active player to have played in the 1970s.
- He was the last active player to have played in the World Hockey Association.
- He was selected as an inductee to the Hockey Hall of Fame in June 2007, in his first year of eligibility, with the ceremony taking place in November 2007.
- In the 2009 book 100 Ranger Greats, was ranked No. 4 all-time of the 901 New York Rangers who had played during the team's first 82 seasons
- In 2010, he was elected as an inaugural inductee into the World Hockey Association Hall of Fame in the "Legends of the Game" category.
- Named to the Order of Hockey in Canada by Hockey Canada in 2013.

== See also ==
- List of NHL statistical leaders
- List of NHL players with 1,000 points
- List of NHL career assists leaders
- List of NHL players with 500 goals
- List of NHL players with 1,000 games played

== Notes ==
Awards and achievements
Preceded by Billy Smith	Winner of the Conn Smythe Trophy; 1984	Succeeded by Wayne Gretzky
Preceded by Wayne Gretzky; Brett Hull	Winner of the Hart Memorial Trophy; 1990; 1992	Succeeded by Brett Hull; Mario Lemieux
Preceded by Adam Graves	Steven McDonald Extra Effort Award winner 1995, 1996	Succeeded by Brian Leetch
Sporting positions
Preceded by Wayne Gretzky	Edmonton Oilers captain 1988–1991	Succeeded by Kevin Lowe
Preceded by Kelly Kisio; Brian Leetch	New York Rangers captain 1991–1997; 2000–2004	Succeeded by Brian Leetch; Jaromír Jágr
Preceded by Trevor Linden	Vancouver Canucks captain 1997–2000	Succeeded by Markus Näslund
