= Bauernfeind =

Bauernfeind (variant Bauerfeind) is a German surname. It originates as a byname, literally "peasants' enemy", in the late medieval period, before that (12th century) a comparable Geburenhasz is on record. The form Geburnvint is found in the poem Der Renner (c. 1290) as a generic byname of "villains". Historical spelling variants include Pawrnfeynt, Pawrveint, Gebure vient. Specific individuals with the byname are on record in the 15th century. Later, the byname was generically applied to men-at-arms or Landsknechte who chastised the peasant population in the service of a feudal lord. The name gradually developed into a surname in the course of the 16th century. As of 2013 the name had 748 entries in the German telephone directory, with the greatest concentration in Bavaria, and 398 entries for the variant Bauerfeind, with a concentration in North Rhine-Westphalia.

People with the surname:

- Andre Pauernfeindt (fl. 1510s)
- Bruno Bauerfeind, German founder of Bauerfeind AG health equipment company
- Eberhard Bauernfeind, German basketball player
- Erich Bauernfeind (born 1972), Austrian composer and painter
- Georg Wilhelm Bauernfeind (1728–1763), German draftsman and engraver
- Gustav Bauernfeind (1848–1904)
- Johann Bauernfeind (1908–1985), Austrian composer, organist, choirmaster and music teacher
- Karl Maximilian von Bauernfeind (1818–1894), Bauernfeind prism creator
- Kilian Bauernfeind (born 2002), Austrian footballer
- Otto Bauernfeind (1889–1972), German evangelical theologian
- Ricarda Bauernfeind (born 2000), German professional road cyclist
- Tony D. Bauernfeind, USAF lieutenant general
- Volker Bauernfeind-Weinberger (born 1941), German painter and graphic artist
- Winfried Bauernfeind (1935–2020), German opera director
- Wolfgang Bauernfeind (1944–2022), German journalist, feature author and director

== See also ==
- Deutsches Namenlexikon, Gondrom, 2004.
- Lexikon der Familiennamen, Duden, 2008.
