= Hylink =

Chinese advertising and media company

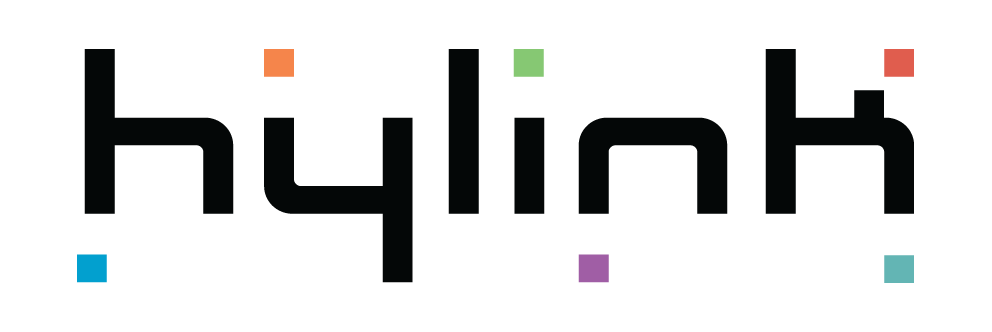
- Industry: Digital Advertising
- Founded: 1994
- Founder: Su Tong (Founder)
- Headquarters: Santa Monica, United States
- Services: Digital media; Big data; Mobile marketing; Search engine marketing; Programmatic advertising; Search engine optimization; Content marketing/EPR; Research and insights; Digital film

Hylink Digital Solutions Co., Ltd. (SSE: 603825) is an advertising agency and media company. It was founded in 1994 and has offices in countries around the world, such as South Korea (through its subsidies), the United States and the United Kingdom.

== Background ==
Hylink Digital Solution Co., Ltd was incorporated in 1994 as part of the Advertising & Marketing Services Industry. It has 2,400 total employees through its 21 offices. Hylink annual revenue for 2019 is $1.49Bn.

In January 2025, founder and CEO, Su Tong resigned due to allegations of market manipulation.

== Leadership ==
- Su Tong - Founder
- Xavier Sun - Chief Operating Officer
- Yukun Bi - Head of Planning
- James Hebbert - Managing Director of Hylink UK
- Ying Tiun - Digital Director of Hylink UK

== See also ==
- Anderson & Lembke
