= Anderson & Lembke =

Defunct advertising agency from Sweden

- Industry: Advertising agency
- Founded: 1963 in Stockholm
- Founders: Bengt Anderson; Rolf Lembke
- Defunct: 2001

Anderson & Lembke (A&L) was a Swedish business-to-business advertising agency started in 1963. It expanded its operations into several countries from the 1970s to 1990s, and the last agency using the original name closed its doors in 2001.

== History ==
Anderson & Lembke was started by Bengt Anderson and Rolf Lembke in Stockholm, 1963. In their work at Atlas Copco, they realised how industrial goods were marketed using cheap black and white leaflets, while consumer goods marketers used high quality design, printing and attention-grabbing media advertising. Their business idea became to adapt techniques used in consumer marketing to products sold for professional use. Anderson and Lembke helped clients with professional market. Their early clients included bearings maker SKF and welding equipment maker Esab.

== Expansion ==
In the early 1970s Anderson & Lembke established an agency in Helsinki, Finland. In 1979 Anderson & Lembke opened an office in London. Another A&L agency based in Stamford, Connecticut since 1982 won creative awards and had technology clients including Microsoft and Sun Microsystems.

By 1984 the A&L group included four companies in Stockholm and agencies in Gothenburg, Helsingborg, Helsinki, Oslo, London, and Stamford. Their combined personnel was 170 and annual sales around US$65 million. The UK agency soon changed ownership through a management buyout and expanded into Basingstoke and Bristol before being merged with McCann-Erickson in 2001.

Anderson & Lembke USA saw another management buyout in 1985 by the agency's top names Hans Ullmark and Steve Trygg, who soon sold their agency on to Chiat/Day/Mojo. They expanded Anderson & Lembke Inc. into San Francisco, Amsterdam and Hongkong. In 1992, Ullmark and Trygg bought the agency back from Chiat/Dayltä, and in 1995 Anderson & Lembke was sold to McCann Erickson. The resulting agency became the fifth largest ad agency in San Francisco with some 340 employees.

Independently from each other, and under separate ownerships, the A&L agencies in the United States and the UK were closed in 2001. The Paris-based La Rochefoucauld, Anderson & Lembke was merged with Territoires, a Publicis group agency in 2000. The Helsinki agency went bankrupt in 1991, but continued as A&L Advertising, then as A&L Grey until the late 1990s.
