= Korea Midland Power =

South Korean energy company

- Native name: 한국중부발전
- Founded: 2001; 25 years ago
- Headquarters: Boryeong, South Chungcheong, South Korea
- Parent: Ministry of Trade
- Website: www.komipo.co.kr/eng/main/main.do

Korea Midland Power Co., Ltd (KOMIPO; Korean: 한국중부발전; RR: Hanguk Joongbu Baljeon) is a South Korean power company. It has expertise in operating the process of manufacturing electrical energy and technology to build power plants. It supplies power to South Korea through wind, solar, solid waste fuels, fuel cell power, and thermal power (coal, liquefied natural gas, and heavy oil).
