= Hanssem =

South Korean appliance and furniture company

Hanssem Co., Ltd.

- Hanssem corporate headquarters building
- Native name: 주식회사 한샘
- Type: Public
- Industry: Retail
- Founded: September 1, 1970; 56 years ago
- Founder: Cho Chang-gul
- Headquarters: Seoul, South Korea
- Key people: Eugene Kim (CEO)
- Products: Home appliances and furniture
- Revenue: ▼ ₩2 trillion (2022) (US$1,530,000,000)
- Operating income: ▼ – ₩83.4 billion (2022)
- Net income: ▼ – ₩71.3 billion (2022)
- Number of employees: 2,215 (2022)
- Website: mall.hanssem.com

Hanssem Co., Ltd. (Korean: 주식회사 한샘) is a South Korean corporation that designs and sells home appliances and furniture. Founded in 1970 by Cho Chang-gul, it is the largest home product brand in the country. Its chief executive officer is Eugene Kim. Hanssem has been credited with introducing the Western world's kitchen concept to South Korea.

== History ==
Traditional Korean kitchens were simpler than contemporary kitchens, typically only having a sink and a flame to cook on. Hanssem was founded on September 1, 1970, by South Korean businessman Cho Chang-gul. The company introduced and commercialized the modern kitchen concept originating in the Western world to South Korea, including cabinets and appliances. The company was credited with pioneering the "stand-up kitchen" in the country, as housewives typically had to crouch down to a low buttumak stove to cook.

In May 2017, Hanssem acquired the Pantech building, a 22-story office building in the Sangam-dong neighborhood of Seoul. The company relocated its headquarters in the Seocho District and its design center in the Jongno District to the building.

In November 2019, Hanssem opened a 3,300-square-foot (310 square meter) flagship store in the southern Seoul neighborhood of Nonhyun-dong, an area with a high concentration of furniture stores. The store opened under the name of Hanssem Nexus, a company affiliate, and was advertised as retailing European furniture imports.

On July 12, 2023, Hanssem chief executive officer Kim Jin-tae was replaced by Eugene Kim, the former leader of cosmetics company Able C&C. The decision to hire Eugene Kim was made amidst ongoing financial struggles that predated her predecessor's appointment to the job.

== Controversy ==
In January 2017, a Hanssem employee alleged that she was sexually assaulted by three colleagues. In an online post, the employee claimed that one coworker had secretly photographed her in a bathroom in December 2016, another had raped her in January 2017, and that a human resources manager had tried to rape her as well. The HR manager was accused of forcing the employee to remain silent about the incident and was ultimately fired before the scandal went public. Local authorities investigated the claim before forwarding the case to the Seoul Central District Prosecutor's Office in March, which closed the case without an indictment due to lack of evidence. The company's handling of the case caused controversy online.
