= Offsetters =

Offsetters is a Vancouver-based organization that aims to guide people and organizations in reducing their climate impact. It was founded by alumni of the Institute for Resources, Environment, and Sustainability at the University of British Columbia. Offsetters provides greenhouse gas management solutions. Their platform is "Less Talk, More Action". Their social objective is to fight global warming and to support sustainable development in the local communities surrounding their projects. Around 80% of their funds received in 2006 were directly invested into projects.

== History ==
In 2005, two professors from the University of British Columbia decided that many of the companies that offer offsets have huge overhead costs/profit margins and very little of the funds generated from offset purchases were used in the projects. They also found that many obtained offsets from questionable sources that may not provide real reductions in the amount of CO_{2} in the atmosphere.

Offsetters was originally conceived as a not-for-profit organization. In July 2015, Offsetters acquired Forest Finest Consulting GmbH, a leading German-based sustainable agro-forestry company, and CO2OL Natural Carbon Collection, a German-based voluntary carbon project developer and retailer. In October 2015, the Offsetters became the company NatureBank Asset Management Inc. (“NatureBank”) and operated Offsetters Clean Technology Inc. as a child company.

Today Offsetters still operates under the parent company NatureBank.

== Operations ==
Offsetters invest in projects that take greenhouse gases out of the atmosphere or stop them from being emitted in the first place. All of the purchases for offsets are invested into carbon offset projects. By installing energy efficient heating systems on a large scale their projects offset the emissions from the client's activities, helping them to become climate neutral.

In order to stabilize the Earth's climate, Offsetters believe a reduction in global emissions by more than 70% is needed. The projects that are initiated and promoted by Offsetters therefore aim to reduce greenhouse gas by 70% or more, and should sustain themselves once started.
