= CoSport =

Hospitality company

Jet Set Sports, LLC
- Trade name: CoSport
- Type: Limited liability company
- Industry: Hospitality
- Founded: 2000
- Founder: Sead Dizdarević
- Headquarters: Far Hills, New Jersey, United States
- Key people: Sead Dizdarević (Chairman & Co-CEO); Alan Dizdarević (Co-CEO); Maria Jedrejčić (Managing Director)
- Services: Consumer hospitality packages and ticket reselling for the Olympic Games
- Owner: Sead Dizdarević
- Subsidiaries: Jet Set Sports GesmbH
- Website: www.cosport.com

Jet Set Sports LLC, d/b/a CoSport, was a distributor of consumer hospitality packages and tickets to the Olympic Games. It is a privately held company established in 2000 and owned by Sead Dizdarević. CoSport has the rights to market and sell consumer hospitality, as well as hospitality management services in Australia, Austria, Bulgaria, Canada, Jordan, Norway, Sweden, the United States, and other EU/EEA countries such as Croatia and Greece. It was the only official authorized Olympic ticket reseller in those countries from the 2006 Winter Olympics to the 2020 Summer Olympics.

CoSport is a part of Jet Set Sports, which was founded in its original form in 1975 and first provided hospitality services to the Olympics in 1984, and is one of the leading providers of VIP and corporate hospitality packages.

In March 2021, CoSport announced that people who purchased tickets for the Tokyo 2020 Olympics from the company would not be refunded the 20% service fee, with Alan Dizdarević saying "There's nothing to give back of the 20%, because it's all been spent." The reason given was that the Tokyo Organising Committee of the Olympic and Paralympic Games only agreed to refund the face value of the tickets to resellers and would not cover an associated loss of service fees.

The CoSport brand was retired in 2026, with all services transitioned to the Jet Set Sports brand.
