= Bauerfeind =

German healthcare equipment company

Bauerfeind AG

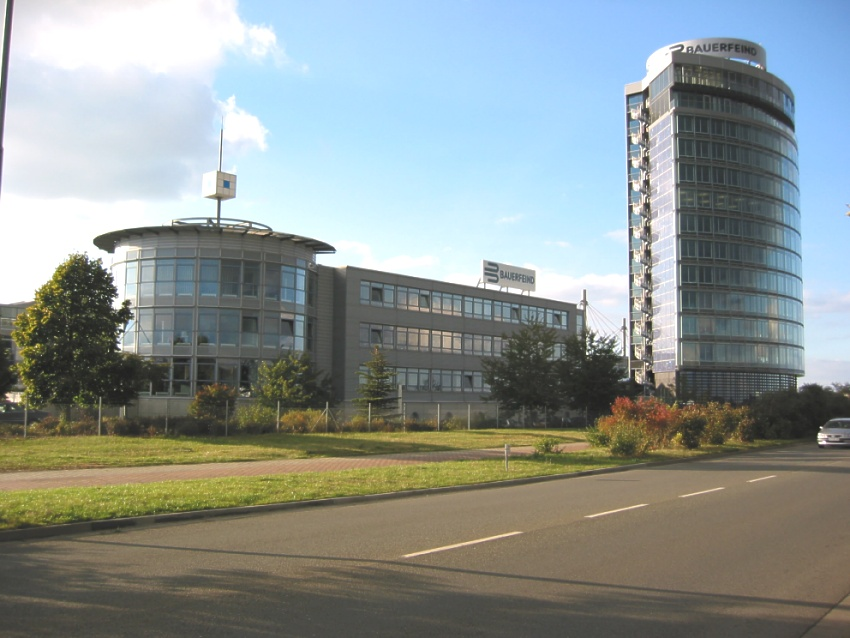
- Trade name: Bauerfeind
- Type: Private
- Industry: Medical Aids
- Founded: 1929
- Founder: Bruno Bauerfeind
- Headquarters: Zeulenroda-Triebes, Germany
- Number of employees: 2,272 (2021)
- Website: http://www.bauerfeind.com/

See Bauernfeind for the surname.

Bauerfeind AG is a German health care equipment company founded in 1929, specialising in medical aids. The company is one of the largest manufacturers of orthopaedic hosiery and inserts in the world. Initially established in Zeulenroda-Triebes, Thuringia, it moved headquarters to West Germany after World War II and returned to Zeulenroda post-reunification. The company's product range includes bandages, orthoses, compression stockings, and orthopedic insoles. The company provides products to support elite athletes and sports clubs.

As a family-owned enterprise, Bauerfeind remains unlisted on all international financial regulated markets. Bauefeind employes over 2,200 people worldwide and is present in global markets including the U.S. and Europe.

== History ==
The company was founded in Zeulenroda in 1929 by Bruno Bauerfeind as a manufacturer of medical rubber stockings. In 1949 his son, Rudolf Bauerfeind, relocated from Zeulenroda due to East Germany nationalisation policy and reconstructed company operations in western Germany. Initially, the company was based in Darmstadt-Eberstadt and later moved to Kempen. Following the German reunification in 1991, Hans B. Bauerfeind, the founder's grandson and chairman of the management board since 1976, returned Bauerfeind GmbH (as it was known at the time) to Zeulenroda. He accomplished this by acquiring a compression bandage manufacturer in the area and investing over 100 million euros into a new production facility, a research centre, and erecting a new 57-metre tall building to use as the business headquarters. Notably, it became the tallest building built in Thuringia since reunification.

In 2002, the family-owned enterprise transformed into an Aktiengesellschaft (en: public limited company).

Hans Bauerfeind expanded the company into an international conglomerate. As of 2011 the company comprised approximately 2,000 employees, of which 800 were located in Zeulenroda. Additionally, it has over 20 subsidiaries in several countries, including Austria, France, Great Britain, Italy, Spain and the United States.

Sales for the year 2015 amounted to 203.7 million euros.

Medical aids are manufactured in Germany and involve manual craftsmanship (i.e. partly made by hand). Since January 2017 Dirk Nowitzki has been a worldwide brand ambassador for the company.

Bauerfeind has developed computer applications such as software to model clients' legs in three dimensions for accurate fitting. For the 2004 Summer Olympics in Athens, Bauerfeind not only supplied compression stockings but also provided 750 pairs of health shoes manufactured by their Berkemann subsidiary.

Hans Bauerfeind himself held more than 60 patents and was awarded an honorary professorship by the Fachhochschule Münster in 2007, recognising his and the company's contributions to the establishment of the technical orthopaedics courses at German technical universities and the extensive financial support provided to the programme at Münster. In 2020 Hans resigned from the position of chairman of the board, having passed the role to Rainer Berthan. On the 14th of July 2023, Hans' death was announced by several media outlets.

Additionally, the company participates in an international education programme and awards a prize of its own.

== Company Economic Information ==
=== Subsidiaries ===
The Bauerfeind Group portfolio includes the InnovationCentre and a hotel named Bio-Seehotel at the Zeulenroda dam. Opened in 2006 following the conversion of a conference centre that used to serve as a hotel for the Free German Trade Union Federation, the Bio-Seehotel has consistently been recognised as one of Germany's best conference hotels.

The company operates 20 foreign subsidiaries in countries such as Russia, Austria, Croatia, France, the UK, Switzerland, and the USA.

=== Mergers & Acquisitions ===
Additionally, in 2016, Bauerfeind acquired a 25% stake in co.don AG, marking a strategic expansion in its investment portfolio.

=== Management ===
As of early 2020, Rainer Berthan succeeded Hans B. Bauerfeind as CEO, while Hans B. Bauerfeind transitioned to the role of Chairman of the Supervisory Board, a position he held until 2022. The company employs approximately 2,200 people globally, with about 1,100 based at the main site in Zeulenroda-Triebes.

=== Financial Data ===
In 2015, the company reported a turnover of 204 million euros, which increased to 250 million euros in 2019, and further to around 300 million euros in 2020. Since 2014, Bauerfeind AG has been incorporated under the ‘Prof. Hans Bauerfeind Family Foundation’, ensuring stable ownership and governance.

== Involvement in Sports ==
Bauerfeind has been actively involved in sports, particularly by providing on-site support services for athletes at the Summer and Winter Olympic Games since 2002, including comprehensive support during the Vancouver and London games for athletes from all participating nations.

The company partners with Deutsche Sporthilfe as of 2013, aiding 3,800 sponsored athletes with products for both injury treatment and prevention.

In 2016, Bauerfeind launched a new product line entitled Sportlinie Bauerfeind Sports specifically designed for sports applications, informed by their engagement in athletic events.
