= Cold-fX =

Medicinal product

Cold-Fx
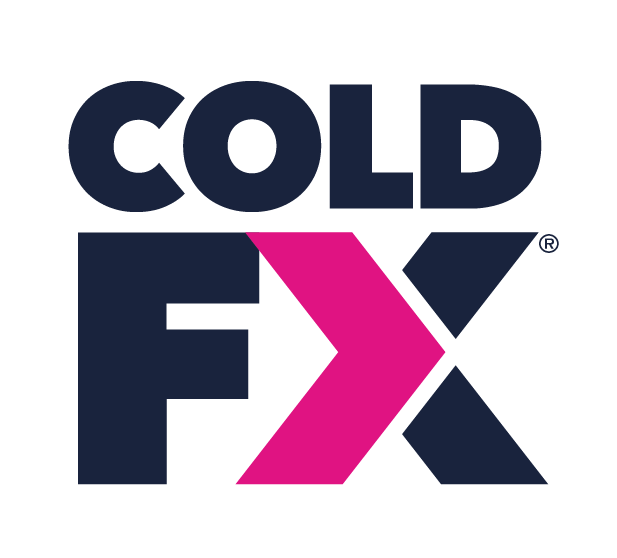
- Brand logo
- Inventor: Afexa Life Sciences Inc.
- Inception: 1999
- Manufacturer: Bausch Health (formerly Valeant Pharmaceuticals International)
- Available: Available
- Current supplier: Bausch & Lomb
- Website: www.cold-fx.ca

Cold-Fx is a product derived from the roots of North American ginseng (Panax quinquefolius). It was formulated by Jacqueline Shan, and originally manufactured by her company, Afexa Life Sciences (formerly called CV Technologies). Afexa was acquired by Valeant Pharmaceuticals in 2011. Bausch & Lomb, acquired by Valeant, is the marketing company for Cold-Fx, as of 2025.

There is little evidence to support that Cold-Fx is effective in the common cold. All trials have been done by the manufacturer and there has been poor data reporting. According to Health Canada's Natural Health Product Directorate records, the company claims that it may "help reduce the frequency, severity and duration of cold and flu symptoms by boosting the immune system". Cold-Fx is licensed by Health Canada as a natural health product.

== Medical uses ==
There is no evidence that Cold-Fx is effective in people infected with the common cold. The effect of preventative use is not clear. When used preventively, it makes no difference on the rate of infections. It also appears to have no effect on how severe the infections are. There is tentative evidence that it may lessen the length of sickness when used preventively.

== Adverse effects ==
Individuals requiring anticoagulant therapy such as warfarin should avoid use of American ginseng. It is not recommended for individuals with impaired liver or renal function. It is not recommended in those who are pregnant or breastfeeding. Other adverse effects may include headaches, anxiety, trouble sleeping and an upset stomach. The product may cause allergic reactions in some people.

== Criticism ==
The product has not been shown to reduce the number or severity of common colds. There is tentative evidence that it may shorten colds in people who are otherwise healthy adults when taken preventively. All studies posing "significant" results on its efficacy were preliminary and funded by the manufacturer.

Other criticisms point out that these studies have been small scale, with conspicuously shallow participant pools and lopsided gender distributions. Researchers have pointed out that there aren't enough studies on the effects of any form of ginseng on the common cold to form any conclusions.

Scientists have argued that the product has not been tested for its ability to treat a cold after an individual has been infected. No studies have yet been performed to assess the possible long term side effects of taking the pills every day during the cold and flu season. The manufacturer was criticized for making health claims about the product that have never been tested or scientifically verified. Until February 2007, the company advised a regimen of 18 pills over a course of 3 days in order to obtain "immediate relief" from a cold. Health Canada's review of the scientific literature confirmed that this is not a claim that it was entitled to make. The company formulated a separate product for this usage. A CV Technologies press release explained the change in the dosing regimen as a choice to take a two-tier approach application to Health Canada.

In 2015, a class action lawsuit was launched that claimed that the manufacturer misled people. A British Columbia Supreme Court judge refused to certify the class action, but did not rule on the claim itself. The appeal on this case was dismissed in 2016.
