= 1987–88 Chicago Blackhawks season =

National Hockey League team season

1987–88 Chicago Blackhawks
- Division: 3rd Norris
- Conference: 6th Campbell
- 1987–88 record: 30–41–9
- Home record: 21–17–2
- Road record: 9–24–7
- Goals for: 284
- Goals against: 328

Team information
- General manager: Bob Pulford
- Coach: Bob Murdoch
- Captain: Vacant
- Alternate captains: Keith Brown; Steve Larmer; Troy Murray; Denis Savard
- Arena: Chicago Stadium

Team leaders
- Goals: Denis Savard (44)
- Assists: Denis Savard (87)
- Points: Denis Savard (131)
- Penalty minutes: Gary Nylund (208)
- Plus/minus: Keith Brown (+5)
- Wins: Darren Pang (17)
- Goals against average: Darren Pang (3.84)

The 1987–88 Chicago Blackhawks season was the 62nd season of operation of the Chicago Blackhawks in the National Hockey League (NHL).

== Offseason ==
The 1987–88 Chicago Black Hawks were coming off a year in which they finished third in the Norris Division and were swept in the first round of the playoffs by the Detroit Red Wings. The Blackhawks made several moves in the offseason with GM Bob Pulford replacing himself as coach with Bob Murdoch and trading young star Eddie Olczyk and aging star Al Secord to the Toronto Maple Leafs for wingers Rick Vaive and Steve Thomas and defenseman Bob McGill. Goaltender Bob Mason was the summer's big free agent signing. Though relatively untested at the NHL level, Mason was in demand after an impressive performance in the 1987 playoffs. In addition to Mason, the team signed Ed Belfour who had just backstopped the University of North Dakota to the NCAA championship, and used their number one pick in the June draft to select Jimmy Waite from the Quebec Major Junior Hockey League. The Blackhawks regular goaltenders from the previous season, veterans Murray Bannerman and Bob Sauve, never played another regular season game for Chicago. The Blackhawks also acquired Duane Sutter from the New York Islanders in exchange for a 2nd-round pick in the 1988 NHL entry draft. Captain Darryl Sutter retired before the start of the season and the team chose not to name a replacement.

== Regular season ==
The Blackhawks were a streaky team – winning five times in a row in October, followed by 7 straight without a win, then won five of the next seven, then lost eight straight. The up and down season ended on the down with the Hawks going winless in their last eight games of the season. The team's fortunes were greatly hampered by injuries, with regulars Doug Wilson, Keith Brown, Steve Thomas, Wayne Presley, Duane Sutter, Bob Murray, and Behn Wilson, all missing considerable playing time. They would finish the season 30–41–9 (69 Points) – good for 3rd place in the Norris Division.

Offensively, the Blackhawks were again led by Denis Savard, who had an outstanding season leading the team in scoring for the seventh year in a row with team highs of 44 goals, 87 assists and 131 points (which ranked third in the league behind Lemieux and Gretzky). Steve Larmer was again second in points with 41 goals and 48 assists. Offseason acquisition Rick Vaive was second in goals with 43, and mid-season addition, Dirk Graham had 37 points in his half-season with the Hawks. On defense, Doug Wilson again led the club with 32 points (in just 27 games), with Keith Brown leading in the club in plus/minus with +5. Gary Nylund led the team in penalty minutes with 208.

In goal, rookie Darren Pang took over in the net with a 3.48 GAA and a 17–23–1 record in 45 games. Bob Mason was relegated to the bench more and more as the season wore on and finished with a 4.15 GAA and 13–18–8 record in 41 games.

=== Final standings ===
Norris Division
	GP	W	L	T	GF	GA	Pts
**Detroit Red Wings**	80	41	28	11	322	269	93
**St. Louis Blues**	80	34	38	8	278	294	76
**Chicago Blackhawks**	80	30	41	9	284	328	69
**Toronto Maple Leafs**	80	21	49	10	273	345	52
Minnesota North Stars	80	19	48	13	242	349	51

Note: GP = Games played, W = Wins, L = Losses, T = Ties, Pts = Points, GF = Goals for, GA = Goals against
Note: Teams that qualified for the playoffs are highlighted in bold.

=== Record vs. opponents ===
Norris Division record vs. opponents

==== Vs. Campbell Conference ====
**Vs. Norris Division**

1987–88 NHL records
Team	**CHI**	**DET**	**MIN**	**STL**	**TOR**	**Total**
Chicago	—	3–5	5–2–1	3–4–1	5–3	**16–14–2**
Detroit	5–3	—	4–3–1	4–1–3	3–3–2	**16–10–6**
Minnesota	2–5–1	3–4–1	—	2–5–1	4–1–3	**11–15–6**
St. Louis	4–3–1	1–4–3	5–2–1	—	6–1–1	**16–10–6**
Toronto	3–5	3–3–2	1–4–3	1–6–1	—	**8–18–6**

**Vs. Smythe Division**

1987–88 NHL records
Team	**CGY**	**EDM**	**LAK**	**VAN**	**WIN**	**Total**
Chicago	0–2–1	2–1	1–2	2–1	1–1–1	**6–7–2**
Detroit	1–1–1	2–1	2–1	2–1	2–0–1	**9–4–2**
Minnesota	0–2–1	0–2–1	0–3	1–2	0–2–1	**1–11–3**
St. Louis	1–2	0–3	1–2	2–1	1–2	**5–10–0**
Toronto	0–3	0–2–1	1–1–1	1–1–1	1–2	**3–9–3**

**Vs. Wales Conference**

**Vs. Adams Division**

1987–88 NHL records
Team	**BOS**	**BUF**	**HFD**	**MTL**	**QUE**	**Total**
Chicago	0–3	1–2	1–2	0–2–1	0–2–1	**2–11–2**
Detroit	2–1	2–1	1–2	1–2	0–3	**6–9–0**
Minnesota	0–3	1–1–1	0–3	1–1–1	1–2	**3–10–2**
St. Louis	2–1	0–3	2–1	1–2	2–1	**7–8–0**
Toronto	1–2	0–3	0–3	0–3	0–3	**1–14–0**

**Vs. Patrick Division**

1987–88 NHL records
Team	**NJD**	**NYI**	**NYR**	**PHI**	**PIT**	**WSH**	**Total**
Chicago	0–3	1–0–2	0–2–1	3–0	1–2	1–2	**6–9–3**
Detroit	3–0	2–1	1–1–1	0–2–1	2–1	2–0–1	**10–5–3**
Minnesota	0–3	1–1–1	1–2	1–2	1–2	0–2–1	**4–12–2**
St. Louis	0–3	0–2–1	0–3	1–2	3–0	2–0–1	**6–10–2**
Toronto	1–2	3–0	1–2	2–1	1–2	1–1–1	**9–8–1**

== Schedule and results ==
1987–88 regular season
October

Game	Result	Date	Score	Opponent	GWG/GTG	Record
1	L	October 8, 1987	5–7	Toronto Maple Leafs (1987–88)	Todd Gill	0–1–0
2	L	October 10, 1987	4–6	@ Washington Capitals (1987–88)	Craig Laughlin	0–2–0
3	W	October 11, 1987	5–3	Philadelphia Flyers (1987–88)	Troy Murray	1–2–0
4	W	October 14, 1987	5–3	St. Louis Blues (1987–88)	Doug Wilson	2–2–0
5	W	October 17, 1987	3–2	@ St. Louis Blues (1987–88)	Denis Savard	3–2–0
6	W	October 18, 1987	6–4	Winnipeg Jets (1987–88)	Denis Savard	4–2–0
7	W	October 21, 1987	5–1	@ Detroit Red Wings (1987–88)	Steve Ludzik	5–2–0
8	L	October 23, 1987	3–7	@ New York Rangers (1987–88)	Tomas Sandstrom	5–3–0
9	L	October 24, 1987	3–5	@ Hartford Whalers (1987–88)	Kevin Dineen	5–4–0
10	T	October 27, 1987	4–4 OT	@ New York Islanders (1987–88)	Richard Kromm	5–4–1
11	L	October 31, 1987	5–6	@ Toronto Maple Leafs (1987–88)	Greg Terrion	5–5–1

November

Game	Result	Date	Score	Opponent	GWG/GTG	Record
12	L	November 1, 1987	3–5	@ Buffalo Sabres (1987–88)	Mike Foligno	5–6–1
13	T	November 4, 1987	4–4 OT	Montreal Canadiens (1987–88)	Doug Wilson	5–6–2
14	L	November 6, 1987	3–6	@ Winnipeg Jets (1987–88)	Thomas Steen	5–7–2
15	W	November 8, 1987	8–5	Minnesota North Stars (1987–88)	Rick Vaive	6–7–2
16	W	November 11, 1987	6–3	Detroit Red Wings (1987–88)	Wayne Presley	7–7–2
17	L	November 14, 1987	0–3	@ Montreal Canadiens (1987–88)	Chris Nilan	7–8–2
18	W	November 15, 1987	5–4	Edmonton Oilers (1987–88)	Troy Murray	8–8–2
19	W	November 18, 1987	5–2	Minnesota North Stars (1987–88)	Brian Noonan	9–8–2
20	L	November 20, 1987	2–5	@ New Jersey Devils (1987–88)	George McPhee	9–9–2
21	W	November 22, 1987	3–2	Vancouver Canucks (1987–88)	Rick Vaive	10–9–2
22	L	November 25, 1987	4–6	@ Los Angeles Kings (1987–88)	Dave Taylor	10–10–2
23	L	November 27, 1987	3–4	@ Edmonton Oilers (1987–88)	Wayne Gretzky	10–11–2
24	L	November 30, 1987	0–4	@ Calgary Flames (1987–88)	Joel Otto	10–12–2

December

Game	Result	Date	Score	Opponent	GWG/GTG	Record
25	L	December 2, 1987	1–5	@ St. Louis Blues (1987–88)	Ron Flockhart	10–13–2
26	L	December 4, 1987	0–12	@ Detroit Red Wings (1987–88)	Tim Higgins	10–14–2
27	L	December 5, 1987	3–7	@ Boston Bruins (1987–88)	Bob Sweeney	10–15–2
28	L	December 9, 1987	2–6	Buffalo Sabres (1987–88)	Paul Cyr	10–16–2
29	L	December 12, 1987	1–2	@ Washington Capitals (1987–88)	Mike Gartner	10–17–2
30	W	December 13, 1987	5–1	Toronto Maple Leafs (1987–88)	Rick Vaive	11–17–2
31	W	December 16, 1987	4–2	@ Minnesota North Stars (1987–88)	Denis Savard	12–17–2
32	W	December 19, 1987	6–2	@ Toronto Maple Leafs (1987–88)	Curt Fraser	13–17–2
33	L	December 20, 1987	2–4	Boston Bruins (1987–88)	Bob Sweeney	13–18–2
34	W	December 23, 1987	7–5	New York Islanders (1987–88)	David Mackey	14–18–2
35	L	December 26, 1987	4–5	St. Louis Blues (1987–88)	Bernie Federko	14–19–2
36	L	December 27, 1987	2–3	@ St. Louis Blues (1987–88)	Brian Benning	14–20–2
37	L	December 30, 1987	4–6	Minnesota North Stars (1987–88)	Dino Ciccarelli	14–21–2
38	W	December 31, 1987	4–1	@ Minnesota North Stars (1987–88)	Rik Wilson	15–21–2

January

Game	Result	Date	Score	Opponent	GWG/GTG	Record
39	L	January 3, 1988	3–5	Calgary Flames (1987–88)	Joe Mullen	15–22–2
40	L	January 6, 1988	1–6	Quebec Nordiques (1987–88)	Terry Carkner	15–23–2
41	W	January 8, 1988	7–3	Toronto Maple Leafs (1987–88)	Rick Vaive	16–23–2
42	W	January 10, 1988	5–2	Los Angeles Kings (1987–88)	Bob McGill	17–23–2
43	T	January 11, 1988	2–2 OT	@ New York Rangers (1987–88)	Troy Murray	17–23–3
44	W	January 13, 1988	2–1	Hartford Whalers (1987–88)	Steve Thomas	18–23–3
45	L	January 16, 1988	1–4	@ Quebec Nordiques (1987–88)	Jeff Brown	18–24–3
46	W	January 17, 1988	5–4	Washington Capitals (1987–88)	Denis Savard	19–24–3
47	L	January 20, 1988	3–8	Pittsburgh Penguins (1987–88)	Mario Lemieux	19–25–3
48	W	January 23, 1988	3–2	@ Toronto Maple Leafs (1987–88)	Mike Stapleton	20–25–3
49	W	January 24, 1988	3–1	Vancouver Canucks (1987–88)	Steve Thomas	21–25–3
50	W	January 26, 1988	6–4	@ Detroit Red Wings (1987–88)	Denis Savard	22–25–3
51	L	January 29, 1988	2–3 OT	@ New Jersey Devils (1987–88)	Craig Wolanin	22–26–3
52	L	January 30, 1988	2–4	@ Pittsburgh Penguins (1987–88)	Mark Kachowski	22–27–3

February

Game	Result	Date	Score	Opponent	GWG/GTG	Record
53	L	February 1, 1988	3–5	Boston Bruins (1987–88)	Bob Sweeney	22–28–3
54	L	February 3, 1988	4–6	Detroit Red Wings (1987–88)	Adam Oates	22–29–3
55	T	February 5, 1988	1–1 OT	@ Winnipeg Jets (1987–88)	Steve Thomas	22–29–4
56	T	February 7, 1988	5–5 OT	@ Quebec Nordiques (1987–88)	Bob Murray	22–29–5
57	W	February 12, 1988	4–3 OT	St. Louis Blues (1987–88)	Rick Vaive	23–29–5
58	W	February 14, 1988	4–3 OT	Buffalo Sabres (1987–88)	Steve Thomas	24–29–5
59	L	February 17, 1988	3–4	Detroit Red Wings (1987–88)	Shawn Burr	24–30–5
60	L	February 20, 1988	1–6	@ Detroit Red Wings (1987–88)	Shawn Burr	24–31–5
61	T	February 21, 1988	3–3 OT	Calgary Flames (1987–88)	Denis Savard	24–31–6
62	W	February 24, 1988	6–4	Edmonton Oilers (1987–88)	Dirk Graham	25–31–6
63	T	February 25, 1988	1–1 OT	@ New York Islanders (1987–88)	Alan Kerr	25–31–7
64	W	February 28, 1988	7–5	Pittsburgh Penguins (1987–88)	Rick Vaive	26–31–7

March

Game	Result	Date	Score	Opponent	GWG/GTG	Record
65	L	March 2, 1988	1–2	Hartford Whalers (1987–88)	Randy Ladouceur	26–32–7
66	W	March 5, 1988	4–2	@ Minnesota North Stars (1987–88)	Brian Noonan	27–32–7
67	L	March 6, 1988	3–4	Detroit Red Wings (1987–88)	Mel Bridgman	27–33–7
68	W	March 9, 1988	4–3	Toronto Maple Leafs (1987–88)	Keith Brown	28–33–7
69	L	March 12, 1988	4–6	@ Toronto Maple Leafs (1987–88)	Todd Gill	28–34–7
70	W	March 13, 1988	5–4 OT	Philadelphia Flyers (1987–88)	Dirk Graham	29–34–7
71	T	March 15, 1988	7–7 OT	@ St. Louis Blues (1987–88)	Herb Raglan	29–34–8
72	W	March 17, 1988	4–3 OT	@ Philadelphia Flyers (1987–88)	Denis Savard	30–34–8
73	L	March 19, 1988	0–3	@ Montreal Canadiens (1987–88)	Brian Skrudland	30–35–8
74	L	March 20, 1988	2–5	St. Louis Blues (1987–88)	Gino Cavallini	30–36–8
75	L	March 23, 1988	4–5	Minnesota North Stars (1987–88)	Wally Schreiber	30–37–8
76	L	March 25, 1988	2–3	@ Vancouver Canucks (1987–88)	Jim Benning	30–38–8
77	L	March 26, 1988	5–9	@ Los Angeles Kings (1987–88)	Bobby Carpenter	30–39–8
78	T	March 28, 1988	7–7 OT	@ Minnesota North Stars (1987–88)	Wayne Presley	30–39–9
79	L	March 30, 1988	3–4	New York Rangers (1987–88)	Ulf Dahlen	30–40–9

April

Game	Result	Date	Score	Opponent	GWG/GTG	Record
80	L	April 3, 1988	3–4 OT	New Jersey Devils (1987–88)	John MacLean	30–41–9

Legend: Win (2 points) Loss (0 points) Tie (1 point)

== Playoffs ==
The Hawks faced Brett Hull and the St. Louis Blues, who finished second in the Norris. After the Blackhawks had been swept two years in a row in the first round, they opened the series in St Louis and lost both games 4–1 and 3–2. The series moved to the Chicago Stadium where the Hawks broke their 11-game playoff losing streak with a 6–3 victory. The winning ways did not last though, as the Hawks lost the next two games – 6–5 and 5–3.

1988 Stanley Cup playoffs
Norris Division Semifinals vs. (N2) St. Louis Blues – Blues win 4–1

Game	Result	Date	Score	Opponent	GWG	Series
1	L	April 6, 1988	1–4	@ St. Louis Blues (1987–88)	Brett Hull	0–1
2	L	April 7, 1988	2–3	@ St. Louis Blues (1987–88)	Brett Hull	0–2
3	W	April 9, 1988	6–3	St. Louis Blues (1987–88)	Denis Savard	1–2
4	L	April 10, 1988	5–6	St. Louis Blues (1987–88)	Tony Hrkac	1–3
5	L	April 12, 1988	3–5	@ St. Louis Blues (1987–88)	Brett Hull	1–4

Legend: Win Loss

== Player stats ==
=== Regular season ===
Scoring

Player	Pos	GP	G	A	Pts	PIM	+/-	PPG	SHG	GWG
Denis Savard	C	80	44	87	131	95	4	14	7	6
Steve Larmer	RW	80	41	48	89	42	-5	21	7	0
Rick Vaive	RW	76	43	26	69	108	-20	19	0	6
Troy Murray	C	79	22	36	58	96	-17	3	2	2
Dirk Graham	W	42	17	19	36	32	4	6	1	2
Doug Wilson	D	27	8	24	32	28	-17	6	1	1
Brian Noonan	RW	77	10	20	30	44	-27	3	0	2
Behn Wilson	D	58	6	23	29	166	-19	3	0	0
Steve Thomas	LW	30	13	13	26	40	1	5	0	3
Bob Murray	D	62	6	20	26	44	-7	1	0	0
Wayne Presley	RW	42	12	10	22	52	-13	4	0	1
Steve Ludzik	C	73	6	15	21	40	-14	1	0	1
Everett Sanipass	LW	57	8	12	20	126	-9	0	0	0
Gary Nylund	D	76	4	15	19	208	-9	0	0	0
Dan Vincelette	LW	69	6	11	17	109	-15	2	0	0
Duane Sutter	RW	37	7	9	16	70	2	3	0	0
Bruce Cassidy	D	21	3	10	13	6	-3	2	0	0
Bob McGill	D	67	4	7	11	131	-19	0	0	1
Mike Stapleton	C	53	2	9	11	59	-10	0	0	1
Curt Fraser	LW	27	4	6	10	57	-13	1	0	1
Trent Yawney	D	15	2	8	10	15	1	2	0	0
Rik Wilson	D	14	4	5	9	6	4	0	0	1
Keith Brown	D	24	3	6	9	45	5	0	0	1
Glen Cochrane	D	73	1	8	9	204	-7	0	0	0
Marc Bergevin	D	58	1	6	7	85	-19	0	0	0
Dave Manson	D	54	1	6	7	185	-12	0	0	0
Darren Pang	G	45	0	6	6	2	0	0	0	0
David Mackey	LW	23	1	3	4	71	-14	0	0	1
Jim Playfair	D	12	1	3	4	21	4	1	0	0
Bill Watson	RW	9	2	0	2	0	-5	0	0	0
Mark LaVarre	RW	18	1	1	2	25	-8	0	0	0
Bob Mason	G	41	0	2	2	0	0	0	0	0
Bill Gardner	C	2	1	0	1	2	-1	1	0	0
Kent Paynter	D	2	0	0	0	2	0	0	0	0

Goaltending

Player	MIN	GP	W	L	T	GA	GAA	SO	SA	SV	SV%
Darren Pang	2548	45	17	23	1	163	3.84	0	1501	1338	.891
Bob Mason	2312	41	13	18	8	160	4.15	0	1353	1193	.882
Team:	4860	80	30	41	9	323	3.99	0	2854	2531	.887

=== Playoffs ===
Scoring

Player	Pos	GP	G	A	Pts	PIM	+/-	PPG	SHG	GWG
Rick Vaive	RW	5	6	2	8	38	1	5	0	0
Denis Savard	C	5	4	3	7	17	3	0	1	1
Steve Larmer	RW	5	1	6	7	0	1	1	0	0
Bob Murray	D	5	1	3	4	2	-1	1	0	0
Trent Yawney	D	5	0	4	4	8	1	0	0	0
Dirk Graham	W	4	1	2	3	4	-1	0	0	0
Steve Thomas	LW	3	1	2	3	6	1	0	0	0
Everett Sanipass	LW	2	2	0	2	2	0	0	0	0
Keith Brown	D	5	0	2	2	10	-3	0	0	0
Troy Murray	C	5	1	0	1	8	-4	1	0	0
Steve Ludzik	C	5	0	1	1	13	0	0	0	0
Glen Cochrane	D	5	0	0	0	2	0	0	0	0
Mark LaVarre	RW	1	0	0	0	2	0	0	0	0
Dave Manson	D	5	0	0	0	27	1	0	0	0
Bob Mason	G	1	0	0	0	0	0	0	0	0
Bob McGill	D	3	0	0	0	2	2	0	0	0
Brian Noonan	RW	3	0	0	0	4	-1	0	0	0
Gary Nylund	D	5	0	0	0	10	-1	0	0	0
Darren Pang	G	4	0	0	0	2	0	0	0	0
Wayne Presley	RW	5	0	0	0	4	4	0	0	0
Mike Rucinski	C	2	0	0	0	0	-1	0	0	0
Duane Sutter	RW	5	0	0	0	21	-1	0	0	0
Dan Vincelette	LW	4	0	0	0	0	-2	0	0	0
Behn Wilson	D	3	0	0	0	6	-2	0	0	0

Goaltending

Player	MIN	GP	W	L	GA	GAA	SO	SA	SV	SV%
Darren Pang	240	4	1	3	18	4.50	0	130	112	.862
Bob Mason	60	1	0	1	3	3.00	0	31	28	.903
Team:	300	5	1	4	21	4.20	0	161	140	.870

Note: Pos = Position; GP = Games played; G = Goals; A = Assists; Pts = Points; +/- = plus/minus; PIM = Penalty minutes; PPG = Power-play goals; SHG = Short-handed goals; GWG = Game-winning goals
MIN = Minutes played; W = Wins; L = Losses; T = Ties; GA = Goals-against; GAA = Goals-against average; SO = Shutouts; SA = Shots against; SV = Shots saved; SV% = Save percentage;

== Draft picks ==
Chicago's draft picks at the 1987 NHL entry draft held at the Joe Louis Arena in Detroit, Michigan. The Blackhawks attempted to select Derek Pizzey in the second round of the 1987 NHL supplemental draft, but the claim was ruled invalid since Pizzey hadn't turned age 21 yet and therefore did not meet eligibility requirements.

Round	#	Player	Nationality	College/Junior/Club team (League)
1	8	Jimmy Waite	Canada	Chicoutimi Saguenéens (QMJHL)
2	29	Ryan McGill	Canada	Swift Current Broncos (WHL)
3	50	Cam Russell	Canada	Hull Olympiques (QMJHL)
3	60	Mike Dagenais	Canada	Peterborough Petes (OHL)
5	92	Ulf Sandstrom	Sweden	Modo Hockey (Sweden)
6	113	Mike McCormick	United States	Richmond Sockeyes (BCJHL)
7	134	Stephen Tepper	United States	Westborough High School (USHS-MA)
8	155	John Reilly	United States	Phillips Andover Academy (USHS-MA)
9	176	Lance Werness	United States	Burnsville High School (USHS-MN)
10	197	Dale Marquette	Canada	Brandon Wheat Kings (WHL)
11	218	Bill LaCouture	United States	Natick High School (USHS-MA)
12	239	Mike Lappin	United States	Northwood School (USHS-NY)

== See also ==
- 1987–88 NHL season
