= 1987–88 Los Angeles Kings season =

National Hockey League team season

1987–88 Los Angeles Kings
- Division: 4th Smythe
- Conference: 7th Campbell
- 1987–88 record: 30–42–8
- Home record: 19–18–3
- Road record: 11–24–5
- Goals for: 318
- Goals against: 359

Team information
- General manager: Rogatien Vachon
- Coach: Mike Murphy; Rogatien Vachon; Robbie Ftorek
- Captain: Dave Taylor
- Arena: The Forum

Team leaders
- Goals: Jimmy Carson (55)
- Assists: Luc Robitaille (58)
- Points: Luc Robitaille (111)
- Penalty minutes: Larry Playfair (197)
- Plus/minus: Ken Baumgartner (+5); Phil Sykes (+5)
- Wins: Roland Melanson (17)
- Goals against average: Glenn Healy (4.33)

The 1987–88 Los Angeles Kings season, was the Kings' 21st season in the National Hockey League (NHL). It saw the Kings finish in fourth place in the Smythe Division with a record of 30 wins, 42 losses, and 8 ties for 68 points. The team finished last in the league in goaltending, with 359 goals allowed. They lost the Division Semifinals in five games to the Calgary Flames.

This was the last season that the Kings wore purple and gold uniforms with a crown logo adorning the front. After this season, they would introduce a new logo with a white, black, and silver uniform, coinciding with the acquisition of Wayne Gretzky from the Edmonton Oilers.

== Regular season ==
=== Final standings ===
Smythe Division
	GP	W	L	T	GF	GA	Pts
**Calgary Flames**	80	48	23	9	397	305	105
**Edmonton Oilers**	80	44	25	11	363	288	99
**Winnipeg Jets**	80	33	36	11	292	310	77
**Los Angeles Kings**	80	30	42	8	318	359	68
Vancouver Canucks	80	25	46	9	272	320	59

Note: GP = Games played, W = Wins, L = Losses, T = Ties, Pts = Points, GF = Goals for, GA = Goals against
Note: Teams that qualified for the playoffs are highlighted in bold.

=== Record vs. opponents ===
Smythe Division record vs. opponents

==== Vs. Campbell Conference ====
**Vs. Smythe Division**

1987–88 NHL records
Team	**CGY**	**EDM**	**LAK**	**VAN**	**WIN**	**Total**
Calgary	—	4–3–1	4–4	6–0–2	3–4–1	**17–11–4**
Edmonton	3–4–1	—	4–2–2	7–0–1	4–1–3	**18–7–7**
Los Angeles	4–4	2–4–2	—	3–4–1	3–5	**12–17–3**
Vancouver	0–6–2	0–7–1	4–3–1	—	3–5	**7–21–4**
Winnipeg	4–3–1	1–4–3	5–3	5–3	—	**15–13–4**

**Vs. Norris Division**

1987–88 NHL records
Team	**CHI**	**DET**	**MIN**	**STL**	**TOR**	**Total**
Calgary	2–0–1	1–1–1	2–0–1	2–1	3–0	**10–2–3**
Edmonton	1–2	1–2	2–0–1	3–0	2–0–1	**9–4–2**
Los Angeles	2–1	1–2	3–0	2–1	1–1–1	**9–5–1**
Vancouver	1–2	1–2	2–1	1–2	1–1–1	**6–8–1**
Winnipeg	1–1–1	0–2–1	2–0–1	2–1	2–1	**7–5–3**

**Vs. Wales Conference**

**Vs. Adams Division**

1987–88 NHL records
Team	**BOS**	**BUF**	**HFD**	**MTL**	**QUE**	**Total**
Calgary	1–2	2–1	3–0	2–0–1	3–0	**11–3–1**
Edmonton	1–1–1	3–0	2–1	0–3	1–1–1	**7–6–2**
Los Angeles	0–2–1	1–2	0–3	1–2	2–1	**4–10–1**
Vancouver	1–2	1–1–1	0–1–2	0–2–1	3–0	**5–6–4**
Winnipeg	0–3	1–1–1	1–2	0–3	2–0–1	**4–9–2**

**Vs. Patrick Division**

1987–88 NHL records
Team	**NJD**	**NYI**	**NYR**	**PHI**	**PIT**	**WSH**	**Total**
Calgary	2–1	1–2	2–1	3–0	0–2–1	2–1	**10–7–1**
Edmonton	1–2	1–2	2–1	2–1	3–0	1–2	**10–8–0**
Los Angeles	1–1–1	0–3	3–0	0–3	0–1–2	1–2	**5–10–3**
Vancouver	3–0	0–3	1–2	1–2	2–1	0–3	**7–11–0**
Winnipeg	2–0–1	1–2	0–2–1	0–3	2–1	2–1	**7–9–2**

== Schedule and results ==
1987–88 regular season
October

Game	Result	Date	Score	Opponent	Record
1	L	October 8, 1987	1–4	New York Islanders (1987–88)	0–1–0
2	W	October 10, 1987	4–2	St. Louis Blues (1987–88)	1–1–0
3	L	October 11, 1987	2–9	Edmonton Oilers (1987–88)	1–2–0
4	L	October 15, 1987	2–3	Boston Bruins (1987–88)	1–3–0
5	L	October 18, 1987	2–4	Vancouver Canucks (1987–88)	1–4–0
6	L	October 21, 1987	2–6	@ Edmonton Oilers (1987–88)	1–5–0
7	L	October 23, 1987	3–4	@ Winnipeg Jets (1987–88)	1–6–0
8	W	October 25, 1987	2–1	@ Winnipeg Jets (1987–88)	2–6–0
9	T	October 27, 1987	4–4 OT	@ Pittsburgh Penguins (1987–88)	2–6–1
10	W	October 28, 1987	4–3	@ New York Rangers (1987–88)	3–6–1
11	L	October 30, 1987	1–5	@ Buffalo Sabres (1987–88)	3–7–1

November

Game	Result	Date	Score	Opponent	Record
12	L	November 1, 1987	1–4	@ Philadelphia Flyers (1987–88)	3–8–1
13	L	November 4, 1987	4–5	Buffalo Sabres (1987–88)	3–9–1
14	W	November 7, 1987	5–4	New York Rangers (1987–88)	4–9–1
15	T	November 10, 1987	4–4 OT	Edmonton Oilers (1987–88)	4–9–2
16	L	November 13, 1987	7–10	@ Calgary Flames (1987–88)	4–10–2
17	W	November 14, 1987	8–7	Quebec Nordiques (1987–88)	5–10–2
18	L	November 17, 1987	3–4	@ New York Islanders (1987–88)	5–11–2
19	L	November 19, 1987	5–7	@ Philadelphia Flyers (1987–88)	5–12–2
20	T	November 21, 1987	6–6 OT	@ Toronto Maple Leafs (1987–88)	5–12–3
21	W	November 22, 1987	8–5	@ Buffalo Sabres (1987–88)	6–12–3
22	W	November 25, 1987	6–4	Chicago Blackhawks (1987–88)	7–12–3
23	L	November 28, 1987	4–8	Calgary Flames (1987–88)	7–13–3
24	T	November 29, 1987	2–2 OT	New Jersey Devils (1987–88)	7–13–4

December

Game	Result	Date	Score	Opponent	Record
25	L	December 1, 1987	6–7 OT	Winnipeg Jets (1987–88)	7–14–4
26	L	December 3, 1987	4–5 OT	Winnipeg Jets (1987–88)	7–15–4
27	L	December 5, 1987	4–6	@ Montreal Canadiens (1987–88)	7–16–4
28	L	December 6, 1987	3–10	@ Washington Capitals (1987–88)	7–17–4
29	L	December 9, 1987	1–2	@ New Jersey Devils (1987–88)	7–18–4
30	L	December 10, 1987	3–4	@ Boston Bruins (1987–88)	7–19–4
31	L	December 12, 1987	2–3	@ Hartford Whalers (1987–88)	7–20–4
32	W	December 16, 1987	7–5	Edmonton Oilers (1987–88)	8–20–4
33	L	December 19, 1987	1–4	Calgary Flames (1987–88)	8–21–4
34	W	December 20, 1987	6–3	@ Calgary Flames (1987–88)	9–21–4
35	L	December 22, 1987	2–5	@ Edmonton Oilers (1987–88)	9–22–4
36	L	December 23, 1987	1–5	@ Vancouver Canucks (1987–88)	9–23–4
37	W	December 26, 1987	3–2	Vancouver Canucks (1987–88)	10–23–4
38	L	December 28, 1987	2–5	Winnipeg Jets (1987–88)	10–24–4
39	W	December 30, 1987	6–4	Winnipeg Jets (1987–88)	11–24–4

January

Game	Result	Date	Score	Opponent	Record
40	W	January 2, 1988	5–2	Montreal Canadiens (1987–88)	12–24–4
41	W	January 4, 1988	6–3	@ New Jersey Devils (1987–88)	13–24–4
42	T	January 5, 1988	4–4 OT	@ Pittsburgh Penguins (1987–88)	13–24–5
43	L	January 8, 1988	3–5	@ Detroit Red Wings (1987–88)	13–25–5
44	L	January 10, 1988	2–5	@ Chicago Blackhawks (1987–88)	13–26–5
45	W	January 11, 1988	5–4	@ Minnesota North Stars (1987–88)	14–26–5
46	L	January 13, 1988	3–8	Washington Capitals (1987–88)	14–27–5
47	L	January 16, 1988	3–4	Hartford Whalers (1987–88)	14–28–5
48	W	January 19, 1988	6–3	New York Rangers (1987–88)	15–28–5
49	W	January 21, 1988	5–4 OT	@ Calgary Flames (1987–88)	16–28–5
50	L	January 22, 1988	3–5	@ Winnipeg Jets (1987–88)	16–29–5
51	W	January 24, 1988	2–1	@ Winnipeg Jets (1987–88)	17–29–5
52	L	January 26, 1988	3–5	@ Quebec Nordiques (1987–88)	17–30–5
53	L	January 27, 1988	2–5	@ Toronto Maple Leafs (1987–88)	17–31–5
54	W	January 30, 1988	5–0	Minnesota North Stars (1987–88)	18–31–5

February

Game	Result	Date	Score	Opponent	Record
55	L	February 2, 1988	2–5	@ Vancouver Canucks (1987–88)	18–32–5
56	W	February 3, 1988	7–2	Vancouver Canucks (1987–88)	19–32–5
57	W	February 6, 1988	7–2	Edmonton Oilers (1987–88)	20–32–5
58	L	February 7, 1988	2–5	Calgary Flames (1987–88)	20–33–5
59	W	February 11, 1988	5–3	Quebec Nordiques (1987–88)	21–33–5
60	L	February 13, 1988	5–7	Pittsburgh Penguins (1987–88)	21–34–5
61	L	February 15, 1988	1–6	Detroit Red Wings (1987–88)	21–35–5
62	W	February 17, 1988	5–4	@ Minnesota North Stars (1987–88)	22–35–5
63	L	February 18, 1988	4–7	@ St. Louis Blues (1987–88)	22–36–5
64	W	February 20, 1988	3–0	Toronto Maple Leafs (1987–88)	23–36–5
65	W	February 24, 1988	4–3	Washington Capitals (1987–88)	24–36–5
66	L	February 27, 1988	6–8	Philadelphia Flyers (1987–88)	24–37–5
67	W	February 28, 1988	2–0	@ Vancouver Canucks (1987–88)	25–37–5

March

Game	Result	Date	Score	Opponent	Record
68	L	March 1, 1988	3–5	@ Edmonton Oilers (1987–88)	25–38–5
69	L	March 5, 1988	6–7 OT	Montreal Canadiens (1987–88)	25–39–5
70	L	March 9, 1988	4–5	@ Hartford Whalers (1987–88)	25–40–5
71	T	March 10, 1988	3–3 OT	@ Boston Bruins (1987–88)	25–40–6
72	W	March 13, 1988	7–6	St. Louis Blues (1987–88)	26–40–6
73	T	March 16, 1988	3–3 OT	Vancouver Canucks (1987–88)	26–40–7
74	L	March 18, 1988	3–5	@ Vancouver Canucks (1987–88)	26–41–7
75	W	March 19, 1988	7–4	Detroit Red Wings (1987–88)	27–41–7
76	L	March 23, 1988	2–6	New York Islanders (1987–88)	27–42–7
77	W	March 26, 1988	9–5	Chicago Blackhawks (1987–88)	28–42–7
78	W	March 30, 1988	9–7	Calgary Flames (1987–88)	29–42–7

April

Game	Result	Date	Score	Opponent	Record
79	W	April 1, 1988	6–3	@ Calgary Flames (1987–88)	30–42–7
80	T	April 3, 1988	5–5 OT	@ Edmonton Oilers (1987–88)	30–42–8

Legend: Win (2 points) Loss (0 points) Tie (1 point)

== Playoffs ==
=== (S1) Calgary Flames vs. (S4) Los Angeles Kings ===
April 6	Los Angeles Kings	2–9	Calgary Flames	Olympic Saddledome	Recap
No scoring		First period	06:00 – Lanny McDonald (1); 08:07 – Al MacInnis (1); 09:36 – Joel Otto (1); 14:42 – pp – Hakan Loob (1)
Jimmy Carson (1) – 07:21; Dave Taylor (1) – pp – 14:49		Second period	02:54 – Joel Otto (2); 10:37 – Joe Mullen (1)
No scoring		Third period	10:07 – pp – Joe Nieuwendyk (1); 13:19 – Gary Roberts (1); 15:02 – Hakan Loob (2)
Roland Melanson 41 saves / 50 shots		Goalie stats	Mike Vernon 15 saves / 17 shots

April 7	Los Angeles Kings	4–6	Calgary Flames	Olympic Saddledome	Recap
Dave Taylor (2) – pp – 15:13		First period	05:06 – pp – Paul Reinhart (1); 09:49 – Joe Mullen (2)
Jimmy Carson (2) – 15:34; Chris Kontos (1) – 19:17		Second period	03:24 – pp – Joel Otto (3); 04:45 – Tim Hunter (1)
Paul Fenton (1) – 16:47		Third period	09:33 – pp – John Tonelli (1); 19:26 – sh – Gary Suter (1)
Glenn Healy 29 saves / 34 shots		Goalie stats	Mike Vernon 23 saves / 27 shots

April 9	Calgary Flames	2–5	Los Angeles Kings	The Forum	Recap
Colin Patterson (1) – sh – 13:58		First period	12:42 – Jimmy Carson (3)
No scoring		Second period	04:38 – pp – Bernie Nicholls (1); 15:15 – pp – Luc Robitaille (1)
Dana Murzyn (1) – 07:31		Third period	00:46 – Bobby Carpenter (1); 14:08 – pp – Jimmy Carson (4)
Mike Vernon 21 saves / 26 shots		Goalie stats	Glenn Healy 28 saves / 30 shots

April 10	Calgary Flames	7–3	Los Angeles Kings	The Forum	Recap
Hakan Loob (3) – sh – 01:29; Brad McCrimmon (1) – pp – 04:56; Gary Roberts (2) – 10:50		First period	12:13 – Dave Taylor (3); 13:10 – pp – Luc Robitaille (2)
Tim Hunter (2) – 14:35; Hakan Loob (4) – 16:05		Second period	08:12 – pp – Steve Duchesne (1)
Lanny McDonald (2) – 00:19; Hakan Loob (5) – 08:41		Third period	No scoring
Mike Vernon 22 saves / 25 shots		Goalie stats	Glenn Healy 27 saves / 34 shots

April 12	Los Angeles Kings	4–6	Calgary Flames	Olympic Saddledome	Recap
Jay Wells (1) – 11:06		First period	04:01 – pp – Hakan Loob (6); 18:22 – pp – Al MacInnis (2)
Bernie Nicholls (2) – 02:45		Second period	03:38 – Paul Reinhart (2)
Paul Fenton (2) – pp – 16:10; Jimmy Carson (5) – 18:18		Third period	01:57 – Hakan Loob (7); 02:32 – Tim Hunter (3); 09:03 – Ric Nattress (1)
Glenn Healy 23 saves / 29 shots		Goalie stats	Mike Vernon 26 saves / 30 shots

Calgary won series 4–1

== Player statistics ==
Regular season
Scoring

Player	Pos	GP	G	A	Pts	PIM	+/-	PPG	SHG	GWG
Luc Robitaille	LW	80	53	58	111	82	-9	17	0	6
Jimmy Carson	C	80	55	52	107	45	-19	22	0	7
Bernie Nicholls	C	65	32	46	78	114	2	8	7	1
Dave Taylor	RW	68	26	41	67	129	-4	9	0	2
Steve Duchesne	D	71	16	39	55	109	0	5	0	4
Bobby Carpenter	C	71	19	33	52	84	-21	10	0	2
Jim Fox	RW	68	16	35	51	18	-7	2	0	1
Paul Fenton	LW	71	20	23	43	46	-14	8	1	1
Mike Allison	LW	37	16	12	28	57	3	5	1	2
Mark Hardy	D	61	6	22	28	99	-27	4	1	1
Jay Wells	D	58	2	23	25	159	-3	1	0	0
Phil Sykes	LW	40	9	12	21	82	5	3	1	0
Bryan Erickson	RW	42	6	15	21	20	-14	2	0	0
Bob Bourne	C	72	7	11	18	28	-31	1	0	1
Ken Hammond	D	46	7	9	16	69	-1	1	0	1
Tom Laidlaw	D	57	1	12	13	47	3	0	0	0
Craig Laughlin	RW	19	4	8	12	6	-8	2	0	0
Chris Kontos	LW/C	6	2	10	12	2	1	1	0	0
Dean Kennedy	D	58	1	11	12	158	-22	0	0	0
Lyle Phair	LW	28	4	6	10	8	-5	0	0	0
Paul Guay	RW	33	4	4	8	40	-7	0	0	0
Ron Duguay	C/RW	15	2	6	8	17	-5	0	0	1
Grant Ledyard	D	23	1	7	8	52	-7	1	0	0
Tim Tookey	C	20	1	6	7	8	-2	0	0	0
Larry Playfair	D	54	0	7	7	197	-13	0	0	0
Sean McKenna	RW	30	3	2	5	12	-14	0	0	0
Ken Baumgartner	LW	30	2	3	5	189	5	0	0	0
John English	D	3	1	3	4	4	2	1	0	0
Joe Paterson	LW	32	1	3	4	113	-10	0	0	0
Glenn Healy	G	34	0	2	2	6	0	0	0	0
Dan Gratton	C	7	1	0	1	5	1	0	0	0
Eric Germain	D	4	0	1	1	13	-2	0	0	0
Bob Kudelski	RW	26	0	1	1	8	-10	0	0	0
Denis Larocque	D	8	0	1	1	18	-4	0	0	0
Wayne McBean	D	27	0	1	1	26	-14	0	0	0
Glen Currie	C	7	0	0	0	0	-2	0	0	0
Craig Duncanson	LW	9	0	0	0	12	-5	0	0	0
Bob Janecyk	G	5	0	0	0	2	0	0	0	0
Roland Melanson	G	47	0	0	0	16	0	0	0	0
Petr Prajsler	D	7	0	0	0	2	2	0	0	0
Craig Redmond	D	2	0	0	0	0	-4	0	0	0
Tiger Williams	LW	2	0	0	0	6	1	0	0	0

Goaltending

Player	MIN	GP	W	L	T	GA	GAA	SO	SA	SV	SV%
Roland Melanson	2676	47	17	20	7	195	4.37	2	1399	1204	.861
Glenn Healy	1869	34	12	18	1	135	4.33	1	1005	870	.866
Bob Janecyk	303	5	1	4	0	23	4.55	0	165	142	.861
Team:	4848	80	30	42	8	353	4.37	3	2569	2216	.863

Playoffs
Scoring

Player	Pos	GP	G	A	Pts	PIM	+/-	PPG	SHG	GWG
Jimmy Carson	C	5	5	3	8	4	-2	1	0	0
Bernie Nicholls	C	5	2	6	8	11	-3	1	0	0
Luc Robitaille	LW	5	2	5	7	18	-8	2	0	1
Dave Taylor	RW	5	3	3	6	6	-3	2	0	0
Steve Duchesne	D	5	1	3	4	14	-5	1	0	0
Paul Fenton	LW	5	2	1	3	2	-3	1	0	0
Jay Wells	D	5	1	2	3	21	0	0	0	0
Bobby Carpenter	C	5	1	1	2	0	-7	0	0	0
Tom Laidlaw	D	5	0	2	2	4	-8	0	0	0
Chris Kontos	LW/C	4	1	0	1	4	-3	0	0	0
Ken Baumgartner	LW	5	0	1	1	28	-6	0	0	0
Bob Bourne	C	5	0	1	1	0	-1	0	0	0
Paul Guay	RW	4	0	1	1	8	-1	0	0	0
Dean Kennedy	D	4	0	1	1	10	4	0	0	0
Craig Laughlin	RW	3	0	1	1	2	-1	0	0	0
Mike Allison	LW	5	0	0	0	16	-3	0	0	0
Ron Duguay	C/RW	2	0	0	0	0	-1	0	0	0
John English	D	1	0	0	0	0	0	0	0	0
Jim Fox	RW	1	0	0	0	0	-2	0	0	0
Eric Germain	D	1	0	0	0	4	-1	0	0	0
Ken Hammond	D	2	0	0	0	4	-5	0	0	0
Glenn Healy	G	4	0	0	0	4	0	0	0	0
Roland Melanson	G	1	0	0	0	0	0	0	0	0
Lyle Phair	LW	1	0	0	0	0	-1	0	0	0
Larry Playfair	D	3	0	0	0	14	-1	0	0	0
Phil Sykes	LW	4	0	0	0	0	-3	0	0	0

Goaltending

Player	MIN	GP	W	L	GA	GAA	SO	SA	SV	SV%
Glenn Healy	240	4	1	3	20	5.00	0	128	108	.844
Roland Melanson	60	1	0	1	9	9.00	0	50	41	.820
Team:	300	5	1	4	29	5.80	0	178	149	.837

Note:

Pos = Position;GP = Games played; G = Goals; A = Assists; Pts = Points; PIM = Penalty minutes; +/- = Plus/minus; PPG = Power-play goals; SHG = Short-handed goals; GWG = Game-winning goals
Pos = Position;GP = Games played; Min, TOI = Minutes played; W = Wins; L = Losses; T,T/OT = Ties; OTL = Overtime losses; GA = Goals-against; GAA = Goals-against average; SO = Shutouts; SA = Shots against; SV = Shots saved;SV% = Save percentage;

== Awards and records ==
- Luc Robitaille, Left Wing, NHL First All-Star Team

== Transactions ==
The Kings were involved in the following transactions during the 1987–88 season.

=== Trades ===
June 13, 1987	To Los Angeles Kings 1st round pick in 1987 – Wayne McBean	To Minnesota North Stars 1st round pick in 1987 – Dave Archibald; 3rd round pick in 1987 NHL entry draft – Kevin Kaminski
October 15, 1987	To Los Angeles Kings Cash	To Hartford Whalers Tiger Williams
December 14, 1987	To Los Angeles Kings Mike Allison	To Toronto Maple Leafs Sean McKenna
January 21, 1988	To Los Angeles Kings Gordie Walker; Mike Siltala	To New York Rangers Joe Paterson
February 4, 1988	To Los Angeles Kings Chris Kontos; 6th round pick in 1988 – Micah Aivazoff	To Pittsburgh Penguins Bryan Erickson
February 9, 1988	To Los Angeles Kings Grant Ledyard	To Washington Capitals Craig Laughlin
February 22, 1988	To Los Angeles Kings Ron Duguay	To New York Rangers Mark Hardy

=== Free agent signings ===
March 18, 1988	From New Haven Nighthawks (AHL) Hubie McDonough

=== Free agents lost ===
August 15, 1987	To Philadelphia Flyers Mark Lofthouse
December 14, 1987	To Pittsburgh Penguins Scott Gruhl

=== Waivers ===
October 5, 1987	To Minnesota North Stars Al Tuer
October 5, 1987	From New York Rangers Paul Fenton
October 5, 1987	From Philadelphia Flyers Tim Tookey

== Draft picks ==
Los Angeles's draft picks at the 1987 NHL entry draft held at the Joe Louis Arena in Detroit, Michigan.

Round	#	Player	Nationality	College/Junior/Club team (League)
1	4	Wayne McBean	Canada	Medicine Hat Tigers (WHL)
2	27	Mark Fitzpatrick	Canada	Medicine Hat Tigers (WHL)
3	43	Ross Wilson	Canada	Peterborough Petes (OHL)
5	90	Mike Vukonich	United States	Denfeld High School (USHS-MN)
6	111	Greg Batters	Canada	Victoria Cougars (WHL)
7	132	Kyosti Karjalainen	Sweden	Brynäs IF (Sweden)
9	174	Jeff Gawlicki	United States	Northern Michigan University (WCHA)
10	195	John Preston	Canada	Boston University (Hockey East)
11	216	Rostislav Vlach	Czechoslovakia	TJ Gottwaldov (Czechoslovakia)
12	237	Mikael Lindholm	Sweden	Brynäs IF (Sweden)
S2	10	Chris Panek	United States	SUNY Plattsburgh (SUNYAC)
