= 1987–88 Winnipeg Jets season =

NHL hockey team season

1987–88 Winnipeg Jets
- Division: 3rd Smythe
- Conference: 4th Campbell
- 1987–88 record: 33–36–11
- Home record: 20–14–6
- Road record: 13–22–5
- Goals for: 292
- Goals against: 310

Team information
- General manager: John Ferguson
- Coach: Dan Maloney
- Captain: Dale Hawerchuk
- Arena: Winnipeg Arena

Team leaders
- Goals: Dale Hawerchuk (44)
- Assists: Dale Hawerchuk (77)
- Points: Dale Hawerchuk (121)
- Penalty minutes: Laurie Boschman (229)
- Wins: Daniel Berthiaume (22)
- Goals against average: Daniel Berthiaume (3.52)

The 1987–88 Winnipeg Jets season was the 16th season of the Winnipeg Jets, their ninth season in the National Hockey League (NHL). The Jets placed third in the Smythe to qualify for the playoffs. The Jets lost to the Edmonton Oilers in the first round.

== Offseason ==
On June 5, 1987, the Jets traded away Perry Turnbull to the St. Louis Blues in exchange for a fifth round draft pick in the 1987 NHL entry draft. Turnbull had an injury plagued 1986–87 season, scoring a goal and six points in 26 games. From 1984 to 1986, he had back-to-back 20+ goal seasons in his first two years with Winnipeg.

Three days later, on June 8, 1987, the Jets traded away Brian Mullen and a tenth round draft pick in the 1987 NHL entry draft to the New York Rangers for the Rangers fifth round pick in the 1988 NHL entry draft and their third round pick in the 1989 NHL entry draft. Mullen had been with Winnipeg since the 1982–83 season, and was coming off a 19-goal and 51 point season in 1986–87.

On June 13, 1987, the Jets participated in the 1987 NHL entry draft, and with their first round selection, 16th overall, Winnipeg selected defenseman Bryan Marchment from the Belleville Bulls of the OHL. Marchment had six goals and 44 points in 52 games with the Bulls in 1986–87.

During training camp, on September 30, 1987, the Jets made another trade with the New York Rangers, acquiring George McPhee from the Rangers for the Jets fourth round draft pick in the 1989 NHL entry draft. One week later, the Jets sent McPhee to the New Jersey Devils for the Devils seventh round draft pick in the 1989 NHL entry draft.

== Regular season ==
=== Final standings ===
Smythe Division
	GP	W	L	T	GF	GA	Pts
**Calgary Flames**	80	48	23	9	397	305	105
**Edmonton Oilers**	80	44	25	11	363	288	99
**Winnipeg Jets**	80	33	36	11	292	310	77
**Los Angeles Kings**	80	30	42	8	318	359	68
Vancouver Canucks	80	25	46	9	272	320	59

Note: GP = Games played, W = Wins, L = Losses, T = Ties, Pts = Points, GF = Goals for, GA = Goals against
Note: Teams that qualified for the playoffs are highlighted in bold.

=== Record vs. opponents ===
Smythe Division record vs. opponents

==== Vs. Campbell Conference ====
**Vs. Smythe Division**

1987–88 NHL records
Team	**CGY**	**EDM**	**LAK**	**VAN**	**WIN**	**Total**
Calgary	—	4–3–1	4–4	6–0–2	3–4–1	**17–11–4**
Edmonton	3–4–1	—	4–2–2	7–0–1	4–1–3	**18–7–7**
Los Angeles	4–4	2–4–2	—	3–4–1	3–5	**12–17–3**
Vancouver	0–6–2	0–7–1	4–3–1	—	3–5	**7–21–4**
Winnipeg	4–3–1	1–4–3	5–3	5–3	—	**15–13–4**

**Vs. Norris Division**

1987–88 NHL records
Team	**CHI**	**DET**	**MIN**	**STL**	**TOR**	**Total**
Calgary	2–0–1	1–1–1	2–0–1	2–1	3–0	**10–2–3**
Edmonton	1–2	1–2	2–0–1	3–0	2–0–1	**9–4–2**
Los Angeles	2–1	1–2	3–0	2–1	1–1–1	**9–5–1**
Vancouver	1–2	1–2	2–1	1–2	1–1–1	**6–8–1**
Winnipeg	1–1–1	0–2–1	2–0–1	2–1	2–1	**7–5–3**

**Vs. Wales Conference**

**Vs. Adams Division**

1987–88 NHL records
Team	**BOS**	**BUF**	**HFD**	**MTL**	**QUE**	**Total**
Calgary	1–2	2–1	3–0	2–0–1	3–0	**11–3–1**
Edmonton	1–1–1	3–0	2–1	0–3	1–1–1	**7–6–2**
Los Angeles	0–2–1	1–2	0–3	1–2	2–1	**4–10–1**
Vancouver	1–2	1–1–1	0–1–2	0–2–1	3–0	**5–6–4**
Winnipeg	0–3	1–1–1	1–2	0–3	2–0–1	**4–9–2**

**Vs. Patrick Division**

1987–88 NHL records
Team	**NJD**	**NYI**	**NYR**	**PHI**	**PIT**	**WSH**	**Total**
Calgary	2–1	1–2	2–1	3–0	0–2–1	2–1	**10–7–1**
Edmonton	1–2	1–2	2–1	2–1	3–0	1–2	**10–8–0**
Los Angeles	1–1–1	0–3	3–0	0–3	0–1–2	1–2	**5–10–3**
Vancouver	3–0	0–3	1–2	1–2	2–1	0–3	**7–11–0**
Winnipeg	2–0–1	1–2	0–2–1	0–3	2–1	2–1	**7–9–2**

== Schedule and results ==
1987–88 regular season
October

Game	Result	Date	Score	Opponent	Record
1	W	October 10, 1987	5–1	@ Calgary Flames (1987–88)	1–0–0
2	W	October 12, 1987	3–2	Calgary Flames (1987–88)	2–0–0
3	W	October 17, 1987	5–2	@ Minnesota North Stars (1987–88)	3–0–0
4	L	October 18, 1987	4–6	@ Chicago Blackhawks (1987–88)	3–1–0
5	L	October 20, 1987	2–6	@ St. Louis Blues (1987–88)	3–2–0
6	W	October 23, 1987	4–3	Los Angeles Kings (1987–88)	4–2–0
7	L	October 25, 1987	1–2	Los Angeles Kings (1987–88)	4–3–0
8	L	October 28, 1987	1–5	Detroit Red Wings (1987–88)	4–4–0
9	W	October 30, 1987	3–2 OT	Washington Capitals (1987–88)	5–4–0

November

Game	Result	Date	Score	Opponent	Record
10	W	November 1, 1987	7–3	Vancouver Canucks (1987–88)	6–4–0
11	L	November 4, 1987	3–7	@ Toronto Maple Leafs (1987–88)	6–5–0
12	W	November 6, 1987	6–3	Chicago Blackhawks (1987–88)	7–5–0
13	W	November 8, 1987	3–1	Vancouver Canucks (1987–88)	8–5–0
14	W	November 10, 1987	4–3 OT	Calgary Flames (1987–88)	9–5–0
15	T	November 12, 1987	1–1 OT	@ New Jersey Devils (1987–88)	9–5–1
16	L	November 14, 1987	3–7	@ New York Islanders (1987–88)	9–6–1
17	L	November 15, 1987	4–6	@ New York Rangers (1987–88)	9–7–1
18	L	November 18, 1987	3–4	Boston Bruins (1987–88)	9–8–1
19	L	November 20, 1987	3–4	New York Rangers (1987–88)	9–9–1
20	W	November 22, 1987	4–3 OT	Edmonton Oilers (1987–88)	10–9–1
21	L	November 25, 1987	8–10	@ Detroit Red Wings (1987–88)	10–10–1
22	L	November 26, 1987	3–5	@ Boston Bruins (1987–88)	10–11–1
23	L	November 28, 1987	3–7	Montreal Canadiens (1987–88)	10–12–1

December

Game	Result	Date	Score	Opponent	Record
24	W	December 1, 1987	7–6 OT	@ Los Angeles Kings (1987–88)	11–12–1
25	W	December 3, 1987	5–4 OT	@ Los Angeles Kings (1987–88)	12–12–1
26	L	December 9, 1987	0–2	@ Edmonton Oilers (1987–88)	12–13–1
27	T	December 11, 1987	3–3 OT	Quebec Nordiques (1987–88)	12–13–2
28	L	December 13, 1987	3–4	Philadelphia Flyers (1987–88)	12–14–2
29	L	December 16, 1987	4–5	@ Calgary Flames (1987–88)	12–15–2
30	T	December 18, 1987	5–5 OT	@ Edmonton Oilers (1987–88)	12–15–3
31	W	December 20, 1987	4–1	New Jersey Devils (1987–88)	13–15–3
32	W	December 22, 1987	5–2	New York Islanders (1987–88)	14–15–3
33	W	December 26, 1987	5–4 OT	Minnesota North Stars (1987–88)	15–15–3
34	W	December 28, 1987	5–2	@ Los Angeles Kings (1987–88)	16–15–3
35	L	December 30, 1987	4–6	@ Los Angeles Kings (1987–88)	16–16–3
36	L	December 31, 1987	1–2	@ Vancouver Canucks (1987–88)	16–17–3

January

Game	Result	Date	Score	Opponent	Record
37	T	January 3, 1988	4–4 OT	Detroit Red Wings (1987–88)	16–17–4
38	L	January 6, 1988	1–6	@ Calgary Flames (1987–88)	16–18–4
39	T	January 8, 1988	4–4 OT	Edmonton Oilers (1987–88)	16–18–5
40	W	January 10, 1988	4–3	Toronto Maple Leafs (1987–88)	17–18–5
41	W	January 12, 1988	5–3	@ Vancouver Canucks (1987–88)	18–18–5
42	L	January 13, 1988	2–8	@ Vancouver Canucks (1987–88)	18–19–5
43	T	January 15, 1988	4–4 OT	@ Edmonton Oilers (1987–88)	18–19–6
44	L	January 17, 1988	5–6	Vancouver Canucks (1987–88)	18–20–6
45	W	January 19, 1988	3–0	St. Louis Blues (1987–88)	19–20–6
46	W	January 22, 1988	5–3	Los Angeles Kings (1987–88)	20–20–6
47	L	January 24, 1988	1–2	Los Angeles Kings (1987–88)	20–21–6
48	W	January 26, 1988	3–2	@ Washington Capitals (1987–88)	21–21–6
49	W	January 27, 1988	4–1	@ Pittsburgh Penguins (1987–88)	22–21–6
50	L	January 30, 1988	3–4	@ Philadelphia Flyers (1987–88)	22–22–6
51	T	January 31, 1988	4–4 OT	@ Buffalo Sabres (1987–88)	22–22–7

February

Game	Result	Date	Score	Opponent	Record
52	W	February 3, 1988	9–0	Calgary Flames (1987–88)	23–22–7
53	T	February 5, 1988	1–1 OT	Chicago Blackhawks (1987–88)	23–22–8
54	T	February 6, 1988	8–8 OT	@ Minnesota North Stars (1987–88)	23–22–9
55	W	February 12, 1988	7–5	Buffalo Sabres (1987–88)	24–22–9
56	W	February 14, 1988	3–2	Quebec Nordiques (1987–88)	25–22–9
57	W	February 16, 1988	7–3	@ Quebec Nordiques (1987–88)	26–22–9
58	L	February 17, 1988	3–4	@ Hartford Whalers (1987–88)	26–23–9
59	L	February 19, 1988	0–6	Washington Capitals (1987–88)	26–24–9
60	L	February 21, 1988	3–4 OT	Edmonton Oilers (1987–88)	26–25–9
61	W	February 23, 1988	4–3 OT	@ Pittsburgh Penguins (1987–88)	27–25–9
62	W	February 24, 1988	3–1	@ New Jersey Devils (1987–88)	28–25–9
63	L	February 27, 1988	0–6	@ Montreal Canadiens (1987–88)	28–26–9
64	L	February 28, 1988	3–5	@ Buffalo Sabres (1987–88)	28–27–9

March

Game	Result	Date	Score	Opponent	Record
65	W	March 1, 1988	6–3	Hartford Whalers (1987–88)	29–27–9
66	W	March 3, 1988	4–3	Vancouver Canucks (1987–88)	30–27–9
67	W	March 5, 1988	10–1	@ Toronto Maple Leafs (1987–88)	31–27–9
68	L	March 7, 1988	0–6	Edmonton Oilers (1987–88)	31–28–9
69	T	March 9, 1988	6–6 OT	Calgary Flames (1987–88)	31–28–10
70	L	March 10, 1988	3–5	@ Calgary Flames (1987–88)	31–29–10
71	L	March 13, 1988	4–5	Pittsburgh Penguins (1987–88)	31–30–10
72	L	March 16, 1988	1–4	Montreal Canadiens (1987–88)	31–31–10
73	L	March 18, 1988	1–4	@ Edmonton Oilers (1987–88)	31–32–10
74	L	March 20, 1988	0–6	New York Islanders (1987–88)	31–33–10
75	L	March 22, 1988	3–4	@ Hartford Whalers (1987–88)	31–34–10
76	L	March 24, 1988	3–4 OT	@ Boston Bruins (1987–88)	31–35–10
77	L	March 26, 1988	0–6	@ Philadelphia Flyers (1987–88)	31–36–10
78	W	March 29, 1988	3–2	@ Vancouver Canucks (1987–88)	32–36–10

April

Game	Result	Date	Score	Opponent	Record
79	T	April 1, 1988	6–6 OT	New York Rangers (1987–88)	32–36–11
80	W	April 3, 1988	5–4 OT	St. Louis Blues (1987–88)	33–36–11

Legend: Win (2 points) Loss (0 points) Tie (1 point)

== Playoffs ==
The Jets lost the Division semi-finals (4–1) to the Edmonton Oilers.

== Player statistics ==
=== Regular season ===
Scoring

Player	Pos	GP	G	A	Pts	PIM	+/-	PPG	SHG	GWG
Dale Hawerchuk	C	80	44	77	121	59	-9	20	3	4
Paul MacLean	RW	77	40	39	79	76	-17	22	0	2
Andrew McBain	RW	74	32	31	63	145	-10	20	0	5
Randy Carlyle	D	78	15	44	59	210	-20	8	0	1
Dave Ellett	D	68	13	45	58	106	-8	5	0	1
Thomas Steen	C	76	16	38	54	53	-11	3	1	1
Mario Marois	D	79	7	44	51	111	5	3	0	1
Laurie Boschman	C	80	25	23	48	229	-24	10	1	3
Iain Duncan	LW	62	19	23	42	73	-2	4	0	4
Ray Neufeld	RW	78	18	18	36	169	-29	9	0	2
Doug Smail	LW	71	15	16	31	34	5	0	3	5
Peter Taglianetti	D	70	6	17	23	182	-13	2	0	1
Gilles Hamel	LW	63	8	11	19	35	-16	1	0	0
Hannu Jarvenpaa	RW	41	6	11	17	34	0	1	0	0
Fredrik Olausson	D	38	5	10	15	18	3	2	0	2
Steve Rooney	LW	56	7	6	13	217	2	0	0	0
Ron Wilson	C	69	5	8	13	28	-1	0	2	0
Mark Kumpel	RW	32	4	4	8	19	4	0	0	0
Brad Jones	LW	19	2	5	7	15	2	0	0	1
Brad Berry	D	48	0	6	6	75	-11	0	0	0
Randy Gilhen	C	13	3	2	5	15	5	0	0	0
Pat Elynuik	RW	13	1	3	4	12	2	0	0	0
Jim Kyte	D	51	1	3	4	128	1	0	0	0
Daniel Berthiaume	G	56	0	2	2	12	0	0	0	0
Peter Douris	RW	4	0	2	2	0	-1	0	0	0
Joel Baillargeon	LW	4	0	1	1	12	0	0	0	0
Jim Nill	RW	24	0	1	1	44	-7	0	0	0
Paul Boutilier	D	6	0	0	0	6	-2	0	0	0
Todd Flichel	D	2	0	0	0	2	-4	0	0	0
Guy Gosselin	D	5	0	0	0	6	-1	0	0	0
Steve Penney	G	8	0	0	0	0	0	0	0	0
Pokey Reddick	G	28	0	0	0	6	0	0	0	0
Dwight Schofield	D	18	0	0	0	33	-3	0	0	0
Alfie Turcotte	C	3	0	0	0	0	-4	0	0	0
Tim Watters	D	36	0	0	0	106	-12	0	0	0

Goaltending

Player	MIN	GP	W	L	T	GA	GAA	SO	SA	SV	SV%
Daniel Berthiaume	3010	56	22	19	7	176	3.51	2	1489	1313	.882
Pokey Reddick	1487	28	9	13	3	102	4.12	0	712	610	.857
Steve Penney	385	8	2	4	1	30	4.68	0	186	156	.839
Team:	4882	80	33	36	11	308	3.79	2	2387	2079	.871

=== Playoffs ===
Scoring

Player	Pos	GP	G	A	Pts	PIM	PPG	SHG	GWG
Dale Hawerchuk	C	5	3	4	7	16	2	0	0
Andrew McBain	RW	5	2	5	7	29	0	1	0
Thomas Steen	C	5	1	5	6	2	1	0	0
Ray Neufeld	RW	5	2	2	4	6	1	0	0
Laurie Boschman	C	5	1	3	4	9	0	0	0
Mario Marois	D	5	0	4	4	6	0	0	0
Dave Ellett	D	5	1	2	3	10	1	0	0
Paul MacLean	RW	5	2	0	2	23	2	0	0
Fredrik Olausson	D	5	1	1	2	0	0	0	0
Peter Taglianetti	D	5	1	1	2	12	0	0	0
Randy Carlyle	D	5	0	2	2	10	0	0	0
Randy Gilhen	C	4	1	0	1	10	0	1	1
Steve Rooney	LW	5	1	0	1	33	0	0	0
Doug Smail	LW	5	1	0	1	22	0	0	0
Iain Duncan	LW	4	0	1	1	0	0	0	0
Daniel Berthiaume	G	5	0	0	0	0	0	0	0
Paul Boutilier	D	5	0	0	0	15	0	0	0
Peter Douris	RW	1	0	0	0	0	0	0	0
Gilles Hamel	LW	1	0	0	0	0	0	0	0
Brad Jones	LW	1	0	0	0	0	0	0	0
Mark Kumpel	RW	4	0	0	0	4	0	0	0
Tim Watters	D	4	0	0	0	4	0	0	0
Ron Wilson	C	1	0	0	0	2	0	0	0

Goaltending

Player	MIN	GP	W	L	GA	GAA	SO	SA	SV	SV%
Daniel Berthiaume	300	5	1	4	25	5.00	0	154	129	.838
Team:	300	5	1	4	25	5.00	0	154	129	.838

Note:

Pos = Position;GP = Games played; G = Goals; A = Assists; Pts = Points; PIM = Penalty minutes; +/- = Plus/minus; PPG = Power-play goals; SHG = Short-handed goals; GWG = Game-winning goals
Pos = Position;GP = Games played; Min, TOI = Minutes played; W = Wins; L = Losses; T,T/OT = Ties; OTL = Overtime losses; GA = Goals-against; GAA = Goals-against average; SO = Shutouts; SA = Shots against; SV = Shots saved;SV% = Save percentage;

== Transactions ==
=== Trades ===
September 30, 1987	To New York Islanders 4th round pick in 1989 – Jim Cummins	To Winnipeg Jets George McPhee
October 7, 1987	To New Jersey Devils George McPhee	To Winnipeg Jets 7th round pick in 1989 – Doug Evans
December 16, 1987	To New York Rangers 5th round pick in 1989 – Aaron Miller	To Winnipeg Jets Paul Boutilier
January 10, 1988	To Detroit Red Wings Jim Nill	To Winnipeg Jets Mark Kumpel
January 14, 1988	To Montreal Canadiens Future Considerations	To Winnipeg Jets Alfie Turcotte
March 7, 1988	To Minnesota North Stars John Blue	To Winnipeg Jets 7th round pick in 1988 – Markus Akerblom
June 13, 1988	To Detroit Red Wings Paul MacLean	To Winnipeg Jets Brent Ashton

=== Free agents ===
Player	Former team
Guy Larose	Undrafted Free Agent
Darren Boyko	New Jersey Devils
Brent Hughes	Undrafted free agent

== Draft picks ==
The Jets selected the following players at the 1987 NHL entry draft, which was held at Joe Louis Arena in Detroit, on June 13, 1987.

=== NHL entry draft ===
Round	Pick	Player	Nationality	College/Junior/Club team
1	16	Bryan Marchment (D)	Canada	Belleville Bulls (OHL)
2	37	Patrik Erickson (C)	Sweden	Brynäs IF (SEL)
4	79	Don McLennan (D)	Canada	University of Denver (NCAA)
5	96	Ken Gernander (RW)	Canada	Greenway (Coleraine, Minnesota) High School
5	100	Darrin Amundson (FWD)	United States	Duluth East (MN) High School
6	121	Joe Harwell (D)	Canada	Hill-Murray (Maplewood, Minnesota) High School
7	142	Tod Hartje (C)	United States	Harvard University (NCAA)
8	163	Markku Kyllonen (LW)	Finland	Oulun Kärpät (Fin D1)
9	184	Jim Fernholz (RW)	United States	White Bear Lake (MN) High School
11	226	Roger Rougelot (G)	United States	Madison Capitols (USHL)
12	247	Hans-Goran Elo (G)	Sweden	Djurgardens IF (SEL)
S2	17	Rob Fowler (F)	United States	Merrimack College (Hockey East)

== See also ==
- 1987–88 NHL season
