= 1987–88 Calgary Flames season =

NHL team season

1987–88 Calgary Flames
- Presidents' Trophy winners
- Smythe Division champions
- Division: 1st Smythe
- Conference: 1st Campbell
- 1987–88 record: 48–23–9
- Home record: 26–11–3
- Road record: 22–12–6
- Goals for: 397
- Goals against: 305

Team information
- General manager: Cliff Fletcher
- Coach: Terry Crisp
- Captain: Lanny McDonald and Jim Peplinski
- Alternate captains: Tim Hunter
- Arena: Olympic Saddledome
- Average attendance: 18,881

Team leaders
- Goals: Joe Nieuwendyk (51 goals)
- Assists: Gary Suter (70 assists)
- Points: Hakan Loob (106) points
- Penalty minutes: Tim Hunter (337)
- Wins: Mike Vernon (39)
- Goals against average: Mike Vernon (3.53)

The 1987–88 Calgary Flames season was the eighth National Hockey League season in Calgary and the 16th season in the NHL for the Flames franchise. The Flames finished atop the Smythe Division standings for the first time in team history, en route to winning their first ever Presidents' Trophy as the top club in the NHL.

The Flames spent almost the entire month of February playing away games as the 1988 Winter Olympics were being held in Calgary at that time.

In the playoffs, the Flames easily defeated the Los Angeles Kings four games to one, setting a franchise record that still stands by scoring 30 goals in a five-game series. The Flames season was ended by their provincial archrivals, again as the Edmonton Oilers swept Calgary out of the Smythe Division Finals en route to their fourth Stanley Cup in five years.

The Flames set numerous franchise records this season, including most wins (48), most home wins (26), most road wins (22), and most points (105), all of which that were tied or broken in 1988–89. The Flames 397 goals remains a franchise record, and one of the highest totals in league history. The Flames also finished first in scoring during the regular season. Furthermore, the Flames led the league in short-handed goals scored (23) and power-play percentage (28.46%).

Freshman sniper Joe Nieuwendyk became the second rookie in NHL history to score 50 goals, as his 51 fell just two shy of Mike Bossy's record of 53 set in 1977–78. Nieuwendyk captured the Calder Memorial Trophy as the NHL's Rookie-of-the-Year for his effort.

Lanny McDonald became the first player to win the King Clancy Memorial Trophy, awarded to players who best exemplify leadership qualities and make notable humanitarian contributions to their community. In addition, Brad McCrimmon won the Emery Edge Award for leading the league in Plus/Minus at +48.

The Flames sent five players to the 1988 All-Star Game: Al MacInnis, Gary Suter, Brad McCrimmon, Joe Nieuwendyk and Mike Vernon. Nieuwendyk was also named to the NHL All-Rookie team.

== Regular season ==
=== Season standings ===
Smythe Division
| | GP | W | L | T | GF | GA | Pts |
|---|---|---|---|---|---|---|---|
| **Calgary Flames** | 80 | 48 | 23 | 9 | 397 | 305 | 105 |
| **Edmonton Oilers** | 80 | 44 | 25 | 11 | 363 | 288 | 99 |
| **Winnipeg Jets** | 80 | 33 | 36 | 11 | 292 | 310 | 77 |
| **Los Angeles Kings** | 80 | 30 | 42 | 8 | 318 | 359 | 68 |
| Vancouver Canucks | 80 | 25 | 46 | 9 | 272 | 320 | 59 |

Note: GP = Games played, W = Wins, L = Losses, T = Ties, Pts = Points, GF = Goals for, GA = Goals against
Note: Teams that qualified for the playoffs are highlighted in bold.

=== Record vs. opponents ===
Smythe Division record vs. opponents

==== Vs. Campbell Conference ====
**Vs. Smythe Division**

1987–88 NHL records
| Team | **CGY** | **EDM** | **LAK** | **VAN** | **WIN** | **Total** |
|---|---|---|---|---|---|---|
| Calgary | — | 4–3–1 | 4–4 | 6–0–2 | 3–4–1 | **17–11–4** |
| Edmonton | 3–4–1 | — | 4–2–2 | 7–0–1 | 4–1–3 | **18–7–7** |
| Los Angeles | 4–4 | 2–4–2 | — | 3–4–1 | 3–5 | **12–17–3** |
| Vancouver | 0–6–2 | 0–7–1 | 4–3–1 | — | 3–5 | **7–21–4** |
| Winnipeg | 4–3–1 | 1–4–3 | 5–3 | 5–3 | — | **15–13–4** |

**Vs. Norris Division**

1987–88 NHL records
| Team | **CHI** | **DET** | **MIN** | **STL** | **TOR** | **Total** |
|---|---|---|---|---|---|---|
| Calgary | 2–0–1 | 1–1–1 | 2–0–1 | 2–1 | 3–0 | **10–2–3** |
| Edmonton | 1–2 | 1–2 | 2–0–1 | 3–0 | 2–0–1 | **9–4–2** |
| Los Angeles | 2–1 | 1–2 | 3–0 | 2–1 | 1–1–1 | **9–5–1** |
| Vancouver | 1–2 | 1–2 | 2–1 | 1–2 | 1–1–1 | **6–8–1** |
| Winnipeg | 1–1–1 | 0–2–1 | 2–0–1 | 2–1 | 2–1 | **7–5–3** |

**Vs. Wales Conference**

**Vs. Adams Division**

1987–88 NHL records
| Team | **BOS** | **BUF** | **HFD** | **MTL** | **QUE** | **Total** |
|---|---|---|---|---|---|---|
| Calgary | 1–2 | 2–1 | 3–0 | 2–0–1 | 3–0 | **11–3–1** |
| Edmonton | 1–1–1 | 3–0 | 2–1 | 0–3 | 1–1–1 | **7–6–2** |
| Los Angeles | 0–2–1 | 1–2 | 0–3 | 1–2 | 2–1 | **4–10–1** |
| Vancouver | 1–2 | 1–1–1 | 0–1–2 | 0–2–1 | 3–0 | **5–6–4** |
| Winnipeg | 0–3 | 1–1–1 | 1–2 | 0–3 | 2–0–1 | **4–9–2** |

**Vs. Patrick Division**

1987–88 NHL records
| Team | **NJD** | **NYI** | **NYR** | **PHI** | **PIT** | **WSH** | **Total** |
|---|---|---|---|---|---|---|---|
| Calgary | 2–1 | 1–2 | 2–1 | 3–0 | 0–2–1 | 2–1 | **10–7–1** |
| Edmonton | 1–2 | 1–2 | 2–1 | 2–1 | 3–0 | 1–2 | **10–8–0** |
| Los Angeles | 1–1–1 | 0–3 | 3–0 | 0–3 | 0–1–2 | 1–2 | **5–10–3** |
| Vancouver | 3–0 | 0–3 | 1–2 | 1–2 | 2–1 | 0–3 | **7–11–0** |
| Winnipeg | 2–0–1 | 1–2 | 0–2–1 | 0–3 | 2–1 | 2–1 | **7–9–2** |

== Schedule and results ==
1987–88 regular season
October: 5–5–1 (home: 1–3–0; road: 4–2–1)

| # | Date | Visitor | Score | Home | OT | Record | Points |
|---|---|---|---|---|---|---|---|
| 1 | October 8 | Detroit | 1 – 5 | Calgary | | 1–0–0 | 2 |
| 2 | October 10 | Winnipeg | 5 – 1 | Calgary | | 1–1–0 | 2 |
| 3 | October 12 | Calgary | 2 – 3 | Winnipeg | | 1–2–0 | 2 |
| 4 | October 14 | Calgary | 5 – 4 | Edmonton | | 2–2–0 | 4 |
| 5 | October 16 | Edmonton | 5 – 2 | Calgary | | 2–3–0 | 4 |
| 6 | October 18 | Boston | 6 – 5 | Calgary | OT | 2–4–0 | 4 |
| 7 | October 20 | Calgary | 4 – 5 | NY Islanders | | 2–5–0 | 4 |
| 8 | October 21 | Calgary | 5 – 4 | NY Rangers | | 3–5–0 | 6 |
| 9 | October 24 | Calgary | 7 – 5 | Quebec | | 4–5–0 | 8 |
| 10 | October 26 | Calgary | 5 – 3 | Montreal | | 5–5–0 | 10 |
| 11 | October 30 | Calgary | 3 – 3 | Vancouver | OT | 5–5–1 | 11 |

November: 9–3–2 (home: 6–2–2; road: 3–1–0)

| # | Date | Visitor | Score | Home | OT | Record | Points |
|---|---|---|---|---|---|---|---|
| 12 | November 3 | NY Rangers | 3 – 5 | Calgary | | 6–5–1 | 13 |
| 13 | November 5 | Edmonton | 4 – 4 | Calgary | OT | 6–5–2 | 14 |
| 14 | November 8 | Buffalo | 6 – 3 | Calgary | | 6–6–2 | 14 |
| 15 | November 10 | Calgary | 3 – 4 | Winnipeg | | 6–7–2 | 14 |
| 16 | November 11 | Calgary | 4 – 3 | Minnesota | | 7–7–2 | 16 |
| 17 | November 13 | Los Angeles | 7 – 10 | Calgary | | 8–7–2 | 18 |
| 18 | November 15 | Vancouver | 4 – 8 | Calgary | | 9–7–2 | 20 |
| 19 | November 17 | Boston | 6 – 3 | Calgary | | 9–8–2 | 20 |
| 20 | November 19 | Quebec | 1 – 9 | Calgary | | 10–8–2 | 22 |
| 21 | November 21 | Pittsburgh | 4 – 4 | Calgary | OT | 10–8–3 | 23 |
| 22 | November 23 | New Jersey | 2 – 9 | Calgary | | 11–8–3 | 25 |
| 23 | November 25 | Calgary | 4 – 2 | Vancouver | | 12–8–3 | 27 |
| 24 | November 28 | Calgary | 8 – 4 | Los Angeles | | 13–8–3 | 29 |
| 25 | November 30 | Chicago | 0 – 4 | Calgary | | 14–8–3 | 31 |

December: 9–3–1 (home: 5–2–1; road: 4–1–1)

| # | Date | Visitor | Score | Home | OT | Record | Points |
|---|---|---|---|---|---|---|---|
| 26 | December 3 | Toronto | 3 – 5 | Calgary | | 15–8–3 | 33 |
| 27 | December 5 | Minnesota | 4 – 4 | Calgary | OT | 15–8–4 | 34 |
| 28 | December 8 | Calgary | 5 – 4 | Washington | | 16–8–4 | 36 |
| 29 | December 9 | Calgary | 2 – 5 | Pittsburgh | | 16–9–4 | 36 |
| 30 | December 11 | Calgary | 5 – 1 | New Jersey | | 17–9–4 | 38 |
| 31 | December 13 | Calgary | 7 – 1 | Buffalo | | 18–9–4 | 40 |
| 32 | December 16 | Winnipeg | 4 – 5 | Calgary | | 19–9–4 | 42 |
| 33 | December 19 | Calgary | 4 – 1 | Los Angeles | | 20–9–4 | 44 |
| 34 | December 20 | Los Angeles | 6 – 3 | Calgary | | 20–10–4 | 44 |
| 35 | December 22 | Hartford | 5 – 6 | Calgary | OT | 21–10–4 | 46 |
| 36 | December 26 | Edmonton | 5 – 4 | Calgary | | 21–11–4 | 46 |
| 37 | December 28 | Montreal | 3 – 9 | Calgary | | 22–11–4 | 48 |
| 38 | December 31 | Philadelphia | 4 – 5 | Calgary | | 23–11–4 | 50 |

January: 9–3–2 (home: 6–1–0; road: 3–2–2)

| # | Date | Visitor | Score | Home | OT | Record | Points |
|---|---|---|---|---|---|---|---|
| 39 | January 2 | Calgary | 3 – 5 | St. Louis | | 23–12–4 | 50 |
| 40 | January 3 | Calgary | 5 – 3 | Chicago | | 24–12–4 | 52 |
| 41 | January 6 | Winnipeg | 1 – 6 | Calgary | | 25–12–4 | 54 |
| 42 | January 8 | NY Islanders | 4 – 7 | Calgary | | 26–12–4 | 56 |
| 43 | January 10 | Washington | 2 – 8 | Calgary | | 27–12–4 | 58 |
| 44 | January 13 | Calgary | 3 – 5 | Edmonton | | 27–13–4 | 58 |
| 45 | January 15 | Calgary | 4 – 4 | Vancouver | OT | 27–13–5 | 59 |
| 46 | January 19 | Vancouver | 5 – 7 | Calgary | | 28–13–5 | 61 |
| 47 | January 21 | Los Angeles | 5 – 4 | Calgary | OT | 28–14–5 | 61 |
| 48 | January 23 | Calgary | 4 – 4 | Detroit | OT | 28–14–6 | 62 |
| 49 | January 25 | Calgary | 11 – 3 | Toronto | | 29–14–6 | 64 |
| 50 | January 27 | Hartford | 1 – 5 | Calgary | | 30–14–6 | 66 |
| 51 | January 29 | Calgary | 5 – 4 | Edmonton | | 31–14–6 | 68 |
| 52 | January 30 | Vancouver | 3 – 4 | Calgary | | 32–14–6 | 70 |

February: 5–6–1 (home: 0–1–0; road: 5–5–1)

| # | Date | Visitor | Score | Home | OT | Record | Points |
|---|---|---|---|---|---|---|---|
| 53 | February 1 | New Jersey | 5 – 4 | Calgary | | 32–15–6 | 70 |
| 54 | February 3 | Calgary | 0 – 9 | Winnipeg | | 32–16–6 | 70 |
| 55 | February 5 | Calgary | 1 – 5 | Detroit | | 32–17–6 | 70 |
| 56 | February 7 | Calgary | 5 – 2 | Los Angeles | | 33–17–6 | 72 |
| 57 | February 12 | Calgary | 3 – 2 | Philadelphia | | 34–17–6 | 74 |
| 58 | February 14 | Calgary | 4 – 5 | Washington | OT | 34–18–6 | 74 |
| 59 | February 16 | Calgary | 3 – 9 | NY Islanders | | 34–19–6 | 74 |
| 60 | February 17 | Calgary | 3 – 5 | NY Rangers | | 34–20–6 | 74 |
| 61 | February 20 | Calgary | 6 – 3 | St. Louis | | 35–20–6 | 76 |
| 62 | February 21 | Calgary | 3 – 3 | Chicago | OT | 35–20–7 | 77 |
| 63 | February 26 | Calgary | 5 – 3 | Vancouver | | 36–20–7 | 79 |
| 64 | February 28 | Calgary | 3 – 2 | Edmonton | | 37–20–7 | 81 |

March: 10–2–2 (home: 7–1–0; road: 3–1–2)

| # | Date | Visitor | Score | Home | OT | Record | Points |
|---|---|---|---|---|---|---|---|
| 65 | March 3 | Philadelphia | 3 – 6 | Calgary | | 38–20–7 | 83 |
| 66 | March 5 | Edmonton | 4 – 7 | Calgary | | 39–20–7 | 85 |
| 67 | March 7 | Pittsburgh | 5 – 4 | Calgary | | 39–21–7 | 85 |
| 68 | March 9 | Calgary | 6 – 6 | Winnipeg | OT | 39–21–8 | 86 |
| 69 | March 10 | Winnipeg | 3 – 5 | Calgary | | 40–21–8 | 88 |
| 70 | March 12 | Buffalo | 4 – 10 | Calgary | | 41–21–8 | 90 |
| 71 | March 15 | Calgary | 8 – 6 | Hartford | | 42–21–8 | 92 |
| 72 | March 17 | Calgary | 7 – 5 | Boston | | 43–21–8 | 94 |
| 73 | March 19 | Calgary | 5 – 4 | Quebec | OT | 44–21–8 | 96 |
| 74 | March 21 | Calgary | 3 – 3 | Montreal | OT | 44–21–9 | 97 |
| 75 | March 24 | Toronto | 1 – 7 | Calgary | | 45–21–9 | 99 |
| 76 | March 26 | Vancouver | 1 – 6 | Calgary | | 46–21–9 | 101 |
| 77 | March 28 | St. Louis | 2 – 7 | Calgary | | 47–21–9 | 103 |
| 78 | March 30 | Calgary | 7 – 9 | Los Angeles | | 47–22–9 | 103 |

April: 1–1–0 (home: 1–1–0; road: 0–0–0)

| # | Date | Visitor | Score | Home | OT | Record | Points |
|---|---|---|---|---|---|---|---|
| 79 | April 1 | Los Angeles | 6 – 3 | Calgary | | 47–23–9 | 103 |
| 80 | April 3 | Minnesota | 1 – 4 | Calgary | | 48–23–9 | 105 |

Legend: Win (2 points) Loss (0 points) Tie (1 point)

== Playoffs ==
1988 Stanley Cup playoffs
Smythe Division Semifinal – Flames win 4–1

| # | Date | Visitor | Score | Home | OT | Series |
|---|---|---|---|---|---|---|
| 1 | April 6 | Los Angeles | 2 – 9 | Calgary | | Calgary leads 1–0 |
| 2 | April 7 | Los Angeles | 4 – 6 | Calgary | | Calgary leads 2–0 |
| 3 | April 9 | Calgary | 2 – 5 | Los Angeles | | Calgary leads 2–1 |
| 4 | April 10 | Calgary | 7 – 3 | Los Angeles | | Calgary leads 3–1 |
| 5 | April 12 | Los Angeles | 4 – 6 | Calgary | | Calgary wins 4–1 |

Smythe Division Final – Oilers win 4–0

| # | Date | Visitor | Score | Home | OT | Series |
|---|---|---|---|---|---|---|
| 1 | April 19 | Edmonton | 3 – 1 | Calgary | | Edmonton leads 1–0 |
| 2 | April 21 | Edmonton | 5 – 4 | Calgary | OT | Edmonton leads 2–0 |
| 3 | April 23 | Calgary | 2 – 4 | Edmonton | | Edmonton leads 3–0 |
| 4 | April 25 | Calgary | 4 – 6 | Edmonton | | Edmonton wins 4–0 |

Legend: Win Loss

== Player statistics ==
=== Skaters ===
Note: GP = Games played; G = Goals; A = Assists; Pts = Points; PIM = Penalty minutes

| | | Regular season | | | | | Playoffs |
| Player | # | GP | G | A | Pts | PIM | GP | G | A | Pts | PIM |
|---|---|---|---|---|---|---|---|---|---|---|---|
| Hakan Loob | 12 | 80 | 50 | 56 | 106 | 47 | 9 | 1 | 9 | 10 | 6 |
| Mike Bullard | 22 | 79 | 48 | 55 | 103 | 68 | 6 | 0 | 2 | 2 | 6 |
| Joe Nieuwendyk | 25 | 75 | 51 | 41 | 92 | 23 | 8 | 3 | 4 | 7 | 2 |
| Gary Suter | 20 | 75 | 21 | 70 | 91 | 124 | 9 | 1 | 9 | 10 | 6 |
| Joe Mullen | 7 | 80 | 40 | 44 | 84 | 30 | 7 | 2 | 4 | 6 | 10 |
| Al MacInnis | 2 | 80 | 25 | 58 | 83 | 114 | 7 | 3 | 6 | 9 | 18 |
| John Tonelli | 27 | 74 | 17 | 41 | 58 | 84 | 6 | 2 | 5 | 7 | 8 |
| Joel Otto | 29 | 62 | 13 | 39 | 52 | 194 | 9 | 3 | 2 | 5 | 24 |
| Jim Peplinski | 24 | 75 | 20 | 31 | 51 | 234 | 9 | 0 | 5 | 5 | 45 |
| Brett Hull^{‡} | 16 | 52 | 26 | 24 | 50 | 12 | – | – | – | – | - |
| Brad McCrimmon | 4 | 80 | 7 | 35 | 42 | 98 | 9 | 2 | 3 | 5 | 22 |
| Carey Wilson^{‡} | 33 | 34 | 9 | 11 | 20 | 18 | – | – | – | – | - |
| Gary Roberts | 10 | 74 | 13 | 15 | 28 | 282 | 9 | 2 | 3 | 5 | 29 |
| Lanny McDonald | 9 | 60 | 10 | 13 | 23 | 57 | 9 | 3 | 1 | 4 | 6 |
| Perry Berezan | 21 | 29 | 7 | 12 | 19 | 66 | 8 | 0 | 2 | 2 | 13 |
| Brian Glynn | 32 | 67 | 5 | 14 | 19 | 87 | 1 | 0 | 0 | 0 | 0 |
| Colin Patterson | 11 | 39 | 7 | 11 | 18 | 28 | 9 | 1 | 0 | 1 | 8 |
| Ric Nattress | 6 | 63 | 2 | 13 | 15 | 37 | 6 | 1 | 3 | 4 | 0 |
| Tim Hunter | 19 | 68 | 8 | 5 | 13 | 337 | 9 | 4 | 0 | 4 | 32 |
| Dana Murzyn^{†} | 5 | 41 | 6 | 5 | 11 | 94 | 5 | 2 | 0 | 2 | 13 |
| Steve Bozek^{‡} | 26 | 26 | 3 | 7 | 10 | 12 | – | – | – | – | - |
| Neil Sheehy^{‡} | 5 | 36 | 2 | 6 | 8 | 73 | – | – | – | – | - |
| Jiri Hrdina | 17 | 9 | 2 | 5 | 7 | 2 | 1 | 0 | 0 | 0 | 0 |
| Rob Ramage^{†} | 55 | 12 | 1 | 6 | 7 | 37 | 9 | 1 | 3 | 4 | 21 |
| Mike Vernon | 30 | 64 | 0 | 7 | 7 | 47 | 9 | 0 | 2 | 2 | 2 |
| Shane Churla^{†} | 15 | 29 | 1 | 5 | 6 | 132 | 7 | 0 | 1 | 1 | 17 |
| Craig Coxe^{†} | 18 | 7 | 2 | 3 | 5 | 32 | 2 | 1 | 0 | 1 | 16 |
| Paul Reinhart | 23 | 14 | 0 | 4 | 4 | 10 | 8 | 2 | 7 | 9 | 6 |
| Kevan Guy | 3 | 11 | 0 | 3 | 3 | 8 | – | – | – | – | - |
| Doug Dadswell | 36 | 25 | 0 | 2 | 2 | 2 | – | – | – | – | - |
| Rich Chernomaz | 33 | 2 | 1 | 0 | 1 | 0 | – | – | – | – | - |
| Randy Bucyk | 18 | 2 | 0 | 0 | 0 | 0 | – | – | – | – | - |
| Rick Wamsley | 31 | 2 | 0 | 0 | 0 | 0 | 1 | 0 | 0 | 0 | 0 |
| Bob Bodak | 28 | 3 | 0 | 0 | 0 | 22 | – | – | – | – | - |

^{†}Denotes player spent time with another team before joining Calgary. Stats reflect time with the Flames only.
^{‡}Traded mid-season.

=== Goaltenders ===
Note: GP = Games played; TOI = Time on ice (minutes); W = Wins; L = Losses; OT = Overtime/shootout losses; GA = Goals against; SO = Shutouts; GAA = Goals against average

| | | Regular season | | | | | | | | Playoffs |
| Player | # | GP | TOI | W | L | T | GA | SO | GAA | GP | TOI | W | L | GA | SO | GAA |
|---|---|---|---|---|---|---|---|---|---|---|---|---|---|---|---|---|
| Mike Vernon | 30 | 64 | 3565 | 39 | 16 | 7 | 210 | 1 | 3.53 | 9 | 515 | 4 | 4 | 34 | 0 | 3.96 |
| Rick Wamsley^{†} | 31 | 2 | 73 | 1 | 0 | 0 | 5 | 0 | 4.11 | 1 | 33 | 0 | 1 | 2 | 0 | 3.64 |
| Doug Dadswell | 36 | 25 | 1221 | 8 | 7 | 2 | 89 | 0 | 4.37 | – | – | – | – | – | – | - |

^{†}Denotes player spent time with another team before joining Calgary. Stats reflect time with the Flames only.

== Transactions ==
The Flames were involved in the following transactions during the 1988–89 season.

=== Trades ===
| June 13, 1987 | To Calgary Flames Ric Nattress | To St. Louis Blues 4th round pick in 1987 (Andy Rymsha); 5th round pick in 1988 (Dave Lacouture) |
| August 26, 1987 | To Calgary Flames Brad McCrimmon | To Philadelphia Flyers 3rd round pick in 1988 (Dominic Roussel); 1st round pick in 1989 (traded to Toronto Maple Leafs; Maple Leafs selected Steve Bancroft) |
| September 17, 1987 | To Calgary Flames 5th round pick in 1988 (Scott Matusovich) | To Toronto Maple Leafs Dale DeGray |
| January 3, 1988 | To Calgary Flames Shane Churla; Dana Murzyn | To Hartford Whalers Neil Sheehy; Carey Wilson rights to Lane MacDonald |
| March 6, 1988 | To Calgary Flames Craig Coxe | To Vancouver Canucks Peter Bakovic; Brian Bradley; Kevan Guy |
| March 7, 1988 | To Calgary Flames Rob Ramage; Rick Wamsley | To St. Louis Blues Steve Bozek; Brett Hull |

=== Free agents ===
| Player | Former team |
| C Randy Bucyk | Montreal Canadiens |
| RW Rich Chernomaz | New Jersey Devils |

| Player | New team |
| G Reggie Lemelin | Boston Bruins |
| F Nick Fotiu | Philadelphia Flyers |

== Draft picks ==
Calgary's picks at the 1987 NHL entry draft, held in Detroit, Michigan.

| Rnd | Pick | Player | Nationality | Position | Team (league) | NHL statistics | | | | |
| Rnd | Pick | Player | Nationality | Position | Team (league) | GP | G | A | Pts | PIM |
|---|---|---|---|---|---|---|---|---|---|---|
| 1 | 19 | Bryan Deasley | Canada | LW | University of Michigan (CCHA) | | | | | |
| 2 | 25 | Stéphane Matteau | Canada | LW | Hull Olympiques (QMJHL) | 848 | 144 | 172 | 316 | 742 |
| 2 | 40 | Kevin Grant | Canada | D | Kitchener Rangers (OHL) | | | | | |
| 3 | 61 | Scott Mahoney | Canada | RW | Oshawa Generals (OHL) | | | | | |
| 4 | 70 | Tim Harris | Canada | RW | LSSU (CCHA) | | | | | |
| 5 | 103 | Tim Corkery | Canada | D | Ferris State University (CCHA) | | | | | |
| 6 | 124 | Joe Aloi | Canada | D | Hull Olympiques (QMJHL) | | | | | |
| 7 | 145 | Peter Ciavaglia | United States | C | N/A | 5 | 0 | 0 | 0 | 0 |
| 8 | 166 | Theoren Fleury | Canada | RW | Moose Jaw Warriors (WHL) | 1084 | 455 | 633 | 1088 | 1840 |
| 9 | 187 | Mark Osiecki | United States | D | N/A | 93 | 3 | 11 | 14 | 43 |
| 10 | 208 | Bill Sedergren | United States | D | N/A | | | | | |
| 11 | 229 | Peter Hasselblad | Sweden | D | N/A | | | | | |
| 12 | 250 | Magnus Svensson | Sweden | D | N/A | 46 | 4 | 14 | 18 | 31 |
| S2 | 20 | Peter Lappin | United States | RW | St. Lawrence University | 7 | 0 | 0 | 0 | 2 |

== See also ==
- 1987–88 NHL season
