= Jim Ennis =

Canadian ice hockey player (born 1967)

- Born: July 10, 1967 (age 58) Sherwood Park, Alberta, Canada
- Height: 6 ft 0 in (183 cm)
- Weight: 200 lb (91 kg; 14 st 4 lb)
- Position: Defence
- Shot: Left
- Played for: Edmonton Oilers
- NHL draft: 126th overall, 1986; Edmonton Oilers
- Playing career: 1987–1990

James Ennis (born July 10, 1967) is a Canadian former professional ice hockey defenceman who played in the National Hockey League for the Edmonton Oilers.

Born in Sherwood Park, Alberta, Ennis played collegiate hockey for Boston University and was drafted by the Edmonton Oilers in the sixth round of the 1986 NHL entry draft. He played in five games for the Oilers in the 1987–88 season and scored a goal, but spent most of his rookie year in their minor league affiliate Nova Scotia Oilers. Before the 1989–90 NHL season, he was traded to the Hartford Whalers for Norm Maciver and spent that season playing for the Whalers' farm club in Binghamton. He retired in 1990.

== Career statistics ==
=== Regular season and playoffs ===
			Regular season					Playoffs
Season	Team	League	GP	G	A	Pts	PIM	GP	G	A	Pts	PIM
1984–85	Sherwood Park Crusaders	AJHL	—	—	—	—	—	—	—	—	—	—
1985–86	Boston University	HE	40	1	4	5	22	—	—	—	—	—
1986–87	Boston University	HE	26	3	4	7	27	—	—	—	—	—
1987–88	Edmonton Oilers	NHL	5	1	0	1	10	—	—	—	—	—
1987–88	Nova Scotia Oilers	AHL	59	8	12	20	102	5	0	1	1	16
1988–89	Cape Breton Oilers	AHL	67	3	15	18	94	—	—	—	—	—
1989–90	Binghamton Whalers	AHL	69	3	12	15	61	—	—	—	—	—
AHL totals			195	14	39	53	257	5	0	1	1	16
NHL totals			5	1	0	1	10	—	—	—	—	—
