= 1987–88 Edmonton Oilers season =

NHL team season

1987–88 Edmonton Oilers
- Stanley Cup champions
- Campbell Conference champions
- Division: 2nd Smythe
- Conference: 2nd Campbell
- 1987–88 record: 44–25–11
- Home record: 28–8–4
- Road record: 16–17–7
- Goals for: 363
- Goals against: 288

Team information
- General manager: Glen Sather
- Coach: Glen Sather
- Captain: Wayne Gretzky
- Alternate captains: Kevin Lowe; Mark Messier
- Arena: Northlands Coliseum
- Average attendance: 17,503 (100%)
- Minor league affiliates: Nova Scotia Oilers (AHL); Milwaukee Admirals (IHL)

Team leaders
- Goals: Craig Simpson and Jari Kurri (43)
- Assists: Wayne Gretzky (109)
- Points: Wayne Gretzky (149)
- Penalty minutes: Steve Smith (286)
- Plus/minus: Steve Smith (+40)
- Wins: Grant Fuhr (40)
- Goals against average: Grant Fuhr (3.43)

The 1987–88 Edmonton Oilers season was the Oilers' ninth season in the NHL, and they were coming off a Stanley Cup championship against the Philadelphia Flyers the previous season, which was their third Stanley Cup in the past 4 seasons. This was the first time since 1980–81 that the Oilers did not win the division, break the 100 point barrier, or lead the NHL in goals.

Wayne Gretzky led the team with 149 points (sitting out 16 games with a knee injury), his lowest point total since his rookie season in 1979–80, and the first time since then that he failed to lead the NHL in scoring. Jari Kurri and Craig Simpson, who the Oilers acquired from the Pittsburgh Penguins during the season, led the team in goals with 43, and Mark Messier set a career high with 111 points. With Paul Coffey being traded during the season to the Penguins, Steve Smith stepped up and led Oilers defense with 55 points and have a team record 286 penalty minutes.

In goal, Grant Fuhr appeared in 75 of the 80 Oilers games, winning a career high 40 games and getting 4 shutouts, while posting a 3.43 GAA and becoming the first Oilers goalie to win the Vezina Trophy. Goalie Andy Moog demanded to be traded from the Oilers, and at the trading deadline, Edmonton dealt Moog and left wing Moe Lemay to the Boston Bruins for goaltender Bill Ranford, left wing Geoff Courtnall, right wing Alan May, and a second-round draft pick in the 1988 NHL entry draft.

== Season standings ==
Smythe Division
	GP	W	L	T	GF	GA	Pts
**Calgary Flames**	80	48	23	9	397	305	105
**Edmonton Oilers**	80	44	25	11	363	288	99
**Winnipeg Jets**	80	33	36	11	292	310	77
**Los Angeles Kings**	80	30	42	8	318	359	68
Vancouver Canucks	80	25	46	9	272	320	59

Note: GP = Games played, W = Wins, L = Losses, T = Ties, Pts = Points, GF = Goals for, GA = Goals against
Note: Teams that qualified for the playoffs are highlighted in bold.

=== Record vs. opponents ===
Smythe Division record vs. opponents

==== Vs. Campbell Conference ====
**Vs. Smythe Division**

1987–88 NHL records
Team	**CGY**	**EDM**	**LAK**	**VAN**	**WIN**	**Total**
Calgary	—	4–3–1	4–4	6–0–2	3–4–1	**17–11–4**
Edmonton	3–4–1	—	4–2–2	7–0–1	4–1–3	**18–7–7**
Los Angeles	4–4	2–4–2	—	3–4–1	3–5	**12–17–3**
Vancouver	0–6–2	0–7–1	4–3–1	—	3–5	**7–21–4**
Winnipeg	4–3–1	1–4–3	5–3	5–3	—	**15–13–4**

**Vs. Norris Division**

1987–88 NHL records
Team	**CHI**	**DET**	**MIN**	**STL**	**TOR**	**Total**
Calgary	2–0–1	1–1–1	2–0–1	2–1	3–0	**10–2–3**
Edmonton	1–2	1–2	2–0–1	3–0	2–0–1	**9–4–2**
Los Angeles	2–1	1–2	3–0	2–1	1–1–1	**9–5–1**
Vancouver	1–2	1–2	2–1	1–2	1–1–1	**6–8–1**
Winnipeg	1–1–1	0–2–1	2–0–1	2–1	2–1	**7–5–3**

**Vs. Wales Conference**

**Vs. Adams Division**

1987–88 NHL records
Team	**BOS**	**BUF**	**HFD**	**MTL**	**QUE**	**Total**
Calgary	1–2	2–1	3–0	2–0–1	3–0	**11–3–1**
Edmonton	1–1–1	3–0	2–1	0–3	1–1–1	**7–6–2**
Los Angeles	0–2–1	1–2	0–3	1–2	2–1	**4–10–1**
Vancouver	1–2	1–1–1	0–1–2	0–2–1	3–0	**5–6–4**
Winnipeg	0–3	1–1–1	1–2	0–3	2–0–1	**4–9–2**

**Vs. Patrick Division**

1987–88 NHL records
Team	**NJD**	**NYI**	**NYR**	**PHI**	**PIT**	**WSH**	**Total**
Calgary	2–1	1–2	2–1	3–0	0–2–1	2–1	**10–7–1**
Edmonton	1–2	1–2	2–1	2–1	3–0	1–2	**10–8–0**
Los Angeles	1–1–1	0–3	3–0	0–3	0–1–2	1–2	**5–10–3**
Vancouver	3–0	0–3	1–2	1–2	2–1	0–3	**7–11–0**
Winnipeg	2–0–1	1–2	0–2–1	0–3	2–1	2–1	**7–9–2**

== Schedule and results ==
1987–88 regular season
October: 6–5–0 (home: 3–2–0; road: 3–3–0)

#	Date	Visitor	Score	Home	OT	Decision	Attendance	Record	Points	Recap
1	October 9	Detroit Red Wings	4 – 1	Edmonton Oilers		Fuhr		0–1–0	0	
2	October 11	Edmonton Oilers	9 – 2	Los Angeles Kings		Fuhr		1–1–0	2	
3	October 14	Calgary Flames	5 – 4	Edmonton Oilers		Fuhr		1–2–0	2	
4	October 16	Edmonton Oilers	5 – 2	Calgary Flames		Fuhr		2–2–0	4	
5	October 17	Boston Bruins	3 – 4	Edmonton Oilers		Fuhr		3–2–0	6	
6	October 21	Los Angeles Kings	2 – 6	Edmonton Oilers		Fuhr		4–2–0	8	
7	October 23	Edmonton Oilers	5 – 4	Vancouver Canucks	OT	Fuhr		5–2–0	10	
8	October 24	Vancouver Canucks	5 – 9	Edmonton Oilers		Fuhr		6–2–0	12	
9	October 27	Edmonton Oilers	0 – 5	Quebec Nordiques		Fuhr		6–3–0	12	
10	October 28	Edmonton Oilers	1 – 3	Montreal Canadiens		Fuhr		6–4–0	12	
11	October 31	Edmonton Oilers	5 – 6	New Jersey Devils		Fuhr		6–5–0	12	

November: 8–3–2 (home: 5–1–0; road: 3–2–2)

#	Date	Visitor	Score	Home	OT	Decision	Attendance	Record	Points	Recap
12	November 1	Edmonton Oilers	7 – 6	New York Rangers		Reaugh		7–5–0	14	
13	November 4	New York Rangers	2 – 7	Edmonton Oilers		Fuhr		8–5–0	16	
14	November 5	Edmonton Oilers	4 – 4	Calgary Flames	OT	Fuhr		8–5–1	17	
15	November 7	Buffalo Sabres	0 – 5	Edmonton Oilers		Fuhr		9–5–1	19	
16	November 10	Edmonton Oilers	4 – 4	Los Angeles Kings	OT	Fuhr		9–5–2	20	
17	November 14	Edmonton Oilers	6 – 5	St. Louis Blues	OT	Fuhr		10–5–2	22	
18	November 15	Edmonton Oilers	4 – 5	Chicago Blackhawks		Fuhr		10–6–2	22	
19	November 18	Quebec Nordiques	1 – 4	Edmonton Oilers		Fuhr		11–6–2	24	
20	November 20	Pittsburgh Penguins	1 – 4	Edmonton Oilers		Fuhr		12–6–2	26	
21	November 22	Edmonton Oilers	3 – 4	Winnipeg Jets	OT	Fuhr		12–7–2	26	
22	November 25	New Jersey Devils	8 – 7	Edmonton Oilers	OT	Fuhr		12–8–2	26	
23	November 27	Chicago Blackhawks	3 – 4	Edmonton Oilers		Fuhr		13–8–2	28	
24	November 29	Edmonton Oilers	5 – 2	Buffalo Sabres		Fuhr		14–8–2	30	

December: 9–4–1 (home: 7–1–1; road: 2–3–0)

#	Date	Visitor	Score	Home	OT	Decision	Attendance	Record	Points	Recap
25	December 1	Edmonton Oilers	2 – 4	Washington Capitals		Fuhr		14–9–2	30	
26	December 2	Edmonton Oilers	4 – 7	Detroit Red Wings		Fuhr		14–10–2	30	
27	December 5	Toronto Maple Leafs	2 – 5	Edmonton Oilers		Fuhr		15–10–2	32	
28	December 6	Minnesota North Stars	4 – 10	Edmonton Oilers		Fuhr		16–10–2	34	
29	December 9	Winnipeg Jets	0 – 2	Edmonton Oilers		Fuhr		17–10–2	36	
30	December 11	Vancouver Canucks	1 – 2	Edmonton Oilers		Fuhr		18–10–2	38	
31	December 12	Edmonton Oilers	6 – 3	Vancouver Canucks		Fuhr		19–10–2	40	
32	December 16	Edmonton Oilers	5 – 7	Los Angeles Kings		Fuhr		19–11–2	40	
33	December 18	Winnipeg Jets	5 – 5	Edmonton Oilers	OT	Fuhr		19–11–3	41	
34	December 19	Hartford Whalers	4 – 3	Edmonton Oilers		Reaugh		19–12–3	41	
35	December 22	Los Angeles Kings	2 – 5	Edmonton Oilers		Fuhr		20–12–3	43	
36	December 26	Edmonton Oilers	5 – 4	Calgary Flames		Fuhr		21–12–3	45	
37	December 28	Vancouver Canucks	3 – 7	Edmonton Oilers		Fuhr		22–12–3	47	
38	December 30	Philadelphia Flyers	0 – 6	Edmonton Oilers		Fuhr		23–12–3	49	

January: 6–5–4 (home: 4–1–1; road: 2–4–3)

#	Date	Visitor	Score	Home	OT	Decision	Attendance	Record	Points	Recap
39	January 2	Edmonton Oilers	0 – 2	Washington Capitals		Fuhr		23–13–3	49	
40	January 4	Edmonton Oilers	2 – 2	Boston Bruins	OT	Fuhr		23–13–4	50	
41	January 6	Edmonton Oilers	5 – 1	Hartford Whalers		Fuhr		24–13–4	52	
42	January 8	Edmonton Oilers	4 – 4	Winnipeg Jets	OT	Fuhr		24–13–5	53	
43	January 9	New York Islanders	1 – 5	Edmonton Oilers		Fuhr		25–13–5	55	
44	January 11	Washington Capitals	2 – 3	Edmonton Oilers		Fuhr		26–13–5	57	
45	January 13	Calgary Flames	3 – 5	Edmonton Oilers		Fuhr		27–13–5	59	
46	January 15	Winnipeg Jets	4 – 4	Edmonton Oilers	OT	Fuhr		27–13–6	60	
47	January 18	Edmonton Oilers	4 – 6	Montreal Canadiens		Fuhr		27–14–6	60	
48	January 19	Edmonton Oilers	4 – 4	Quebec Nordiques	OT	Fuhr		27–14–7	61	
49	January 21	Edmonton Oilers	1 – 3	Philadelphia Flyers		Fuhr		27–15–7	61	
50	January 23	Edmonton Oilers	2 – 3	New York Islanders		Fuhr		27–16–7	61	
51	January 25	Edmonton Oilers	6 – 4	Pittsburgh Penguins		Fuhr		28–16–7	63	
52	January 29	Calgary Flames	5 – 4	Edmonton Oilers		Fuhr		28–17–7	63	
53	January 30	Hartford Whalers	2 – 5	Edmonton Oilers		Fuhr		29–17–7	65	

February: 6–4–1 (home: 3–2–1; road: 3–2–0)

#	Date	Visitor	Score	Home	OT	Decision	Attendance	Record	Points	Recap
54	February 3	New Jersey Devils	5 – 8	Edmonton Oilers		Fuhr		30–17–7	67	
55	February 6	Edmonton Oilers	2 – 7	Los Angeles Kings		Fuhr		30–18–7	67	
56	February 11	Edmonton Oilers	7 – 2	Vancouver Canucks		Fuhr		31–18–7	69	
57	February 12	Boston Bruins	7 – 4	Edmonton Oilers		Fuhr		31–19–7	69	
58	February 14	Vancouver Canucks	6 – 7	Edmonton Oilers		Fuhr		32–19–7	71	
59	February 17	Toronto Maple Leafs	4 – 4	Edmonton Oilers	OT	Fuhr		32–19–8	72	
60	February 19	Pittsburgh Penguins	3 – 7	Edmonton Oilers		Fuhr		33–19–8	74	
61	February 21	Edmonton Oilers	4 – 3	Winnipeg Jets	OT	Fuhr		34–19–8	76	
62	February 23	Edmonton Oilers	6 – 4	St. Louis Blues		Fuhr		35–19–8	78	
63	February 24	Edmonton Oilers	4 – 6	Chicago Blackhawks		Fuhr		35–20–8	78	
64	February 28	Calgary Flames	3 – 2	Edmonton Oilers		Fuhr		35–21–8	78	

March: 7–4–3 (home: 5–1–0; road: 2–3–3)

#	Date	Visitor	Score	Home	OT	Decision	Attendance	Record	Points	Recap
65	March 1	Los Angeles Kings	3 – 5	Edmonton Oilers		Fuhr		36–21–8	80	
66	March 4	Philadelphia Flyers	4 – 7	Edmonton Oilers		Fuhr		37–21–8	82	
67	March 5	Edmonton Oilers	4 – 7	Calgary Flames		Fuhr		37–22–8	82	
68	March 7	Edmonton Oilers	6 – 0	Winnipeg Jets		Fuhr		38–22–8	84	
69	March 9	Montreal Canadiens	4 – 1	Edmonton Oilers		Fuhr		38–23–8	84	
70	March 12	Edmonton Oilers	3 – 3	Vancouver Canucks	OT	Ranford		38–23–9	85	
71	March 15	Buffalo Sabres	4 – 6	Edmonton Oilers		Fuhr		39–23–9	87	
72	March 18	Winnipeg Jets	1 – 4	Edmonton Oilers		Ranford		40–23–9	89	
73	March 20	Edmonton Oilers	5 – 5	Minnesota North Stars	OT	Ranford		40–23–10	90	
74	March 22	Edmonton Oilers	6 – 4	Detroit Red Wings		Fuhr		41–23–10	92	
75	March 24	Edmonton Oilers	1 – 6	New York Rangers		Fuhr		42–23–10	94	
76	March 26	Edmonton Oilers	4 – 5	New York Islanders		Fuhr		42–24–10	94	
77	March 28	Edmonton Oilers	6 – 4	Toronto Maple Leafs		Ranford		43–24–10	96	
78	March 30	Minnesota North Stars	3 – 6	Edmonton Oilers		Fuhr		44–24–10	98	

April: 1–0–1 (home: 1–0–1; road: 0–0–0)

#	Date	Visitor	Score	Home	OT	Decision	Attendance	Record	Points	Recap
79	April 1	St. Louis Blues	2 – 5	Edmonton Oilers		Ranford		44–25–10	98	
80	April 3	Los Angeles Kings	5 – 5	Edmonton Oilers	OT	Fuhr		44–25–11	99	

Legend: Win (2 points) Loss (0 points) Tie (1 point)

== Playoffs ==
In the playoffs, the Oilers started off by defeating the Winnipeg Jets in 5 games, and faced their Battle of Alberta rivals, the Calgary Flames in the Smythe Division finals. The Flames ended the Oilers' streak of six straight division titles by finishing six points ahead of Edmonton during the regular season and were favoured to win the series, however, the Oilers quickly swept Calgary to advance to the Campbell Conference finals, against the Detroit Red Wings. Edmonton had no problem getting past Detroit, winning the series in five games, and faced the Boston Bruins in the Stanley Cup Final. The Oilers continued to dominate, sweeping Boston despite having to play five games (game four was cancelled midway through the third period with the score tied at three due to a power failure at the Boston Garden) to win their fourth Stanley Cup in five years. Grant Fuhr set an NHL record by winning 16 playoff games, while Wayne Gretzky took home the Conn Smythe Trophy after earning a league high 43 playoff points.

1988 Stanley Cup playoffs
Smythe Division Semifinals vs. (S3) Winnipeg Jets; Oilers won series 4–1

#	Date	Visitor	Score	Home	OT	Decision	Attendance	Series	Recap
1	April 6	Winnipeg Jets	4 – 7	Edmonton Oilers		Fuhr		1–0	
2	April 7	Winnipeg Jets	2 – 3	Edmonton Oilers		Fuhr		2–0	
3	April 9	Edmonton Oilers	4 – 6	Winnipeg Jets		Fuhr		2–1	
4	April 10	Edmonton Oilers	5 – 3	Winnipeg Jets		Fuhr		3–1	
1	April 12	Winnipeg Jets	2 – 6	Edmonton Oilers		Fuhr		4–1	

Smythe Division Finals vs. (S1) Calgary Flames; Oilers won series 4–0

#	Date	Visitor	Score	Home	OT	Decision	Attendance	Series	Recap
1	April 19	Edmonton Oilers	3 – 1	Calgary Flames		Fuhr		1–0	
2	April 21	Edmonton Oilers	5 – 4	Calgary Flames	OT	Fuhr		2–0	
3	April 23	Calgary Flames	2 – 4	Edmonton Oilers		Fuhr		3–0	
4	April 25	Calgary Flames	4 – 6	Edmonton Oilers		Fuhr		4–0	

Campbell Conference Finals vs. (N1) Detroit Red Wings; Oilers won series 4–1

#	Date	Visitor	Score	Home	OT	Decision	Attendance	Series	Recap
1	May 3	Detroit Red Wings	1 – 4	Edmonton Oilers		Fuhr		1–0	
2	May 5	Detroit Red Wings	3 – 5	Edmonton Oilers		Fuhr		2–0	
3	May 7	Edmonton Oilers	2 – 5	Detroit Red Wings		Fuhr		2–1	
4	May 9	Edmonton Oilers	4 – 3	Detroit Red Wings	OT	Fuhr		3–1	
5	May 11	Detroit Red Wings	4 – 8	Edmonton Oilers		Fuhr		4–1	

Stanley Cup Finals vs. (A2) Boston Bruins; Oilers won series 4–0

#	Date	Visitor	Score	Home	OT	Decision	Attendance	Series	Recap
1	May 18	Boston Bruins	1 – 2	Edmonton Oilers		Fuhr		1–0	
2	May 20	Boston Bruins	2 – 4	Edmonton Oilers		Fuhr		2–0	
3	May 22	Edmonton Oilers	6 – 3	Boston Bruins		Fuhr		3–0	
4	May 24	Edmonton Oilers	3 – 3	Boston Bruins		Fuhr		3–0	
5	May 26	Boston Bruins	3 – 6	Edmonton Oilers		Fuhr		4–0	

Legend: Win Loss

== Season stats ==
=== Scoring leaders ===
Player	GP	G	A	Pts	PIM
Wayne Gretzky	64	40	109	149	24
Mark Messier	77	37	74	111	103
Jari Kurri	80	43	53	96	30
Glenn Anderson	80	38	50	88	58
Esa Tikkanen	80	23	51	74	153

=== Goaltending ===
Player	GP	TOI	W	L	T	GA	SO	Save %	GAA
Bill Ranford	6	325	3	0	2	16	0	.899	2.95
Grant Fuhr	75	4304	40	24	9	246	4	.881	3.43
Daryl Reaugh	6	176	1	1	0	14	0	.877	4.77
Warren Skorodenski	3	61	0	0	0	7	0	.720	6.89

== Playoff stats ==
=== Scoring leaders ===
Player	GP	G	A	Pts	PIM
Wayne Gretzky	19	12	31	43	16
Mark Messier	19	11	23	34	29
Jari Kurri	19	14	17	31	12
Esa Tikkanen	19	10	17	27	72
Glenn Anderson	19	9	16	25	49

=== Goaltending ===
Player	GP	TOI	W	L	GA	SO	Save %	GAA
Grant Fuhr	19	1136	16	2	55	0	.883	2.90

== Awards and records ==
=== Records ===
- 1,050: A new NHL record for most assists in a career by Wayne Gretzky on Mar 1, 1988.
- 286: An Oilers record for most penalty minutes in a single season by Steve Smith.

- 266: A new Oilers record for most penalty minutes in a single season by a defenceman by Steve Smith on ???, 1988.

- 51: A new NHL record for most career even strength goals in a playoffs by Jari Kurri on ???, 1988.
- 40: An Oilers record for most wins in a single season by Grant Fuhr.

- 34: A new Oilers record for most wins in a single season by Grant Fuhr on February 23, 1988.

- 31: A new NHL record for most assists in a playoffs by Wayne Gretzky on May 26, 1988.

=== Milestones ===
Regular Season
Player	Milestone	Reached
Kelly Buchberger	1st NHL Game	October 9, 1987
Jim Ennis	1st NHL Game	October 9, 1987
Glenn Anderson	16th NHL Hat-trick	October 11, 1987
Jim Ennis	1st NHL Goal; 1st NHL Point	October 11, 1987
John Miner	1st NHL Game; 1st NHL Assist; 1st NHL Point	October 11, 1987
Jari Kurri	400th NHL Assist	October 14, 1987
Craig Muni	100th NHL Game	October 14, 1987
Glenn Anderson	17th NHL Hat-trick	October 16, 1987
John Miner	1st NHL Goal	October 16, 1987
Normand Lacombe	100th NHL Game	October 17, 1987
Craig MacTavish	200th NHL PIM	October 17, 1987
Charlie Huddy	300th NHL PIM	October 23, 1987
Wayne Gretzky	300th NHL PIM	October 24, 1987
Kevin McClelland	1,000th NHL PIM	October 24, 1987
Grant Fuhr	30th NHL Assist	October 31, 1987
Steve Graves	1st NHL Assist	November 1, 1987
Craig MacTavish	200th NHL Point	November 1, 1987
Daryl Reaugh	1st NHL Win	November 1, 1987
Ron Shudra	1st NHL Game	November 1, 1987
Esa Tikkanen	100th NHL Point	November 1, 1987
Wayne Gretzky	42nd NHL Hat-trick; 1,000th NHL Assist	November 4, 1987
Mike Krushelnyski	300th NHL Point	November 5, 1987
Ron Shudra	1st NHL Assist; 1st NHL Point	November 7, 1987
Craig Muni	100th NHL PIM	November 15, 1987
Steve Smith	400th NHL PIM	November 25, 1987
Mike Krushelnyski	400th NHL Game	November 29, 1987
Mark Messier	800th NHL PIM	November 29, 1987
Esa Tikkanen	200th NHL PIM	December 5, 1987
Wayne Gretzky	43rd NHL Hat-trick; 4th Five-Goal NHL Game	December 6, 1987
Craig MacTavish	400th NHL Game	December 11, 1987
Marty McSorley	700th NHL PIM; 200th NHL Game	December 12, 1987
Mark Messier	600th NHL Game	December 12, 1987
Mark Messier	400th NHL Assist	December 16, 1987
Craig Simpson	2nd NHL Gordie Howe hat trick	December 16, 1987
Wayne Gretzky	1,600th NHL Point	December 22, 1987
Jeff Beukeboom	200th NHL PIM	December 30, 1987
Dave Hannan	300th NHL Game	December 30, 1987
Jari Kurri	800th NHL Point	December 30, 1987
Kevin McClelland	1,100th NHL PIM	December 30, 1987
Scott Metcalfe	1st NHL Game	January 4, 1988
Grant Fuhr	300th NHL Game	January 15, 1988
Mark Messier	700th NHL Point	January 15, 1988
Kelly Buchberger	1st NHL Goal; 1st NHL Point	January 19, 1988
Selmar Odelein	1st NHL Assist; 1st NHL Point	January 19, 1988
Dave Hannan	1st NHL Hat-trick	January 25, 1988
Craig Simpson	200th NHL Game	January 29, 1988
Steve Smith	500th NHL PIM	January 30, 1988
Marty McSorley	800th NHL PIM	February 3, 1988
Esa Tikkanen	3rd NHL Hat-trick	February 3, 1988
Dave Hannan	400th NHL PIM	February 12, 1988
Mark Messier	9th NHL Hat-trick	February 14, 1988
Kevin Lowe	700th NHL PIM	February 17, 1988
Jeff Beukeboom	100th NHL Game	February 19, 1988
Steve Dykstra	400th NHL PIM	February 19, 1988
Charlie Huddy	200th NHL Assist	February 21, 1988
Glenn Anderson	18th NHL Hat-trick; 2nd Four-Goal NHL Game; 2nd NHL Natural Hat-trick	March 4, 1988
Kevin McClelland	1,200th NHL PIM	March 4, 1988
Jeff Beukeboom	300th NHL PIM	March 7, 1988
Kevin McClelland	400th NHL Game	March 7, 1988
Glenn Anderson	500th NHL PIM	March 9, 1988
Geoff Courtnall	??? NHL Hat-trick	March 15, 1988
Mark Messier	300th NHL Goal	March 15, 1988
Craig Simpson	50th Goal in 71 Games	March 15, 1988
Mike Krushelynski	300th NHL PIM	March 18, 1988
Craig MacTavish	100th NHL Goal	March 18, 1988
Glenn Anderson	700th NHL Point	March 22, 1988
Steve Smith	600th NHL PIM	March 24, 1988
Keith Acton	400th NHL PIM	March 26, 1988
Glenn Anderson	600th NHL Game	March 30, 1988
Steve Smith	100th NHL Point	March 30, 1988
Esa Tikkanen	100th NHL Assist	March 30, 1988
Esa Tikkanen	300th NHL PIM	April 1, 1988
Jari Kurri	600th NHL Game	April 3, 1988

Playoffs
Player	Milestone	Reached
Glenn Anderson	200th NHL PIM; 2nd NHL Hat-trick	April 6, 1988
Dave Hannan	1st NHL Game; 1st NHL Assist; 1st NHL Point	April 6, 1988
Normand Lacombe	1st NHL Game	April 6, 1988
Kevin Lowe	100th NHL Game	April 6, 1988
Craig Simpson	1st NHL Game; 1st NHL Goal; 1st NHL Assist; 1st NHL Point	April 6, 1988
Glenn Anderson	100th NHL Game	April 7, 1988
Jari Kurri	100th NHL Game	April 7, 1988
Normand Lacombe	1st NHL Goal; 1st NHL Point	April 9, 1988
Marty McSorley	150th NHL PIM	April 9, 1988
Grant Fuhr	50th NHL Win	April 10, 1988
Kevin McClelland	200th NHL PIM	April 10, 1988
Wayne Gretzky	150th NHL Assist	April 12, 1988
Kevin Lowe	100th NHL PIM	April 12, 1988
Jari Kurri	150th NHL Point	April 21, 1988
Esa Tikkanen	50th NHL PIM	April 21, 1988
Dave Hannan	1st NHL Goal	April 25, 1988
Mark Messier	50th NHL Goal	April 25, 1988
Steve Smith	100th NHL PIM	April 25, 1988
Wayne Gretzky	50th NHL PIM	May 7, 1988
Keith Acton	50th NHL PIM	May 9, 1988
Mark Messier	150th NHL Point	May 9, 1988
Grant Fuhr	10th NHL Assist	May 11, 1988
Mike Krushelnyski	50th NHL Point	May 11, 1988
Randy Gregg	100th NHL Game	May 20, 1988
Kevin McClelland	250th NHL PIM	May 20, 1988
Esa Tikkanen	1st NHL Hat-trick	May 22, 1988
Esa Tikkanen	100th NHL PIM; 50th NHL Game	May 24, 1988
Wayne Gretzky	250th NHL Point	May 26, 1988

== Transactions ==
=== Trades ===
October 19, 1987	To Montreal Canadiens Cash	To Edmonton Oilers Dave Donnelly
November 24, 1987	To Pittsburgh Penguins Paul Coffey; Dave Hunter; Wayne Van Dorp	To Edmonton Oilers Moe Mantha; Dave Hannan; Craig Simpson; Chris Joseph
January 22, 1988	To Minnesota North Stars Moe Mantha	To Edmonton Oilers Keith Acton
February 11, 1988	To Buffalo Sabres Scott Metcalfe; 9th round pick in 1989	To Edmonton Oilers Steve Dykstra; 7th round pick in 1989
March 8, 1988	To Boston Bruins Andy Moog; Moe Lemay	To Edmonton Oilers Bill Ranford; Geoff Courtnall; Alan May; 2nd round pick in 1988

=== Players acquired ===
Date	Player	Former team
July 27, 1987	Gary Emmons	New York Rangers
October 8, 1987	Warren Skorodenski	Chicago Blackhawks

=== Players lost ===
Date	Player	New team
July 1, 1987	Murray Eaves	Detroit Red Wings
July 17, 1987	Don Biggs	Philadelphia Flyers
July 31, 1987	Jim Playfair	Chicago Blackhawks
March 2, 1988	Ken Berry	Vancouver Canucks

=== Waivers ===
Date	Player	Team
October 5, 1987	Mark Lamb	from Detroit Red Wings
October 5, 1987	Reijo Ruotsalainen	to New Jersey Devils
October 5, 1987	Al Tuer	to Minnesota North Stars

== Draft picks ==
Edmonton's draft picks at the 1987 NHL entry draft. The Oilers attempted to select Dave Wensley in the second round of the 1987 NHL supplemental draft, but the claim was ruled invalid since Wensley entered school after age 20 and therefore did not meet eligibility requirements.

Round	#	Player	Nationality	College/Junior/Club team (League)
1	21	Peter Soberlak	Canada	Swift Current Broncos (WHL)
2	42	Brad Werenka	Canada	Northern Michigan Wildcats (WCHA)
3	63	Geoff Smith	Canada	St. Albert Saints (AJHL)
4	64	Peter Eriksson	Sweden	HV71 (Elitserien)
5	105	Shaun Van Allen	Canada	Saskatoon Blades (WHL)
6	126	Radek Toupal	Czechoslovakia	České Budějovice (Czechoslovak Extraliga)
7	147	Tomas Srsen	Czechoslovakia	TJ Zetor Brno (Czechoslovak Extraliga)
8	168	Age Ellingsen	Norway	Storhamar Dragons (Norwegian 1. Divisjon)
9	189	Gavin Armstrong	Canada	RPI Engineers (ECAC)
10	210	Mike Tinkham	United States	Newburyport High School (USHS)
11	231	Jeff Pauletti	Canada	Minnesota Golden Gophers (WCHA)
12	241	Jesper Duus	Denmark	Rødovre Mighty Bulls (Danish Eliteserien)
12	252	Igor Vyazmikin	Soviet Union	CSKA Moscow (Soviet League)
