= Tim Higgins (ice hockey) =

Canadian ice hockey player (born 1958)

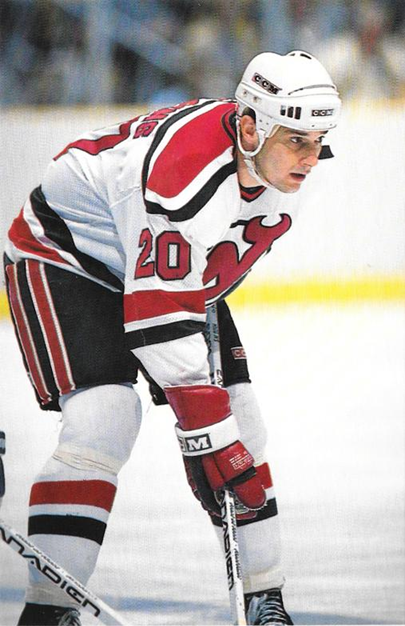
- Born: February 7, 1958 (age 68) Ottawa, Ontario, Canada
- Height: 6 ft 0 in (183 cm)
- Weight: 185 lb (84 kg; 13 st 3 lb)
- Position: Right wing
- Shot: Right
- Played for: Chicago Black Hawks; New Jersey Devils; Detroit Red Wings
- NHL draft: 10th overall, 1978; Chicago Black Hawks
- Playing career: 1978–1989

Timothy Raymond Higgins (born February 7, 1958) is a Canadian retired former professional ice hockey player who played 706 career NHL games with the Chicago Black Hawks, New Jersey Devils and Detroit Red Wings. He played junior hockey with his hometown Ottawa 67's and was drafted in the first round of the 1978 NHL Amateur Draft, 10th overall by the Black Hawks.

== Career statistics ==
			Regular season					Playoffs
Season	Team	League	GP	G	A	Pts	PIM	GP	G	A	Pts	PIM
1974–75	Ottawa 67's	OMJHL	22	1	3	4	6	—	—	—	—	—
1975–76	Ottawa 67's	OMJHL	59	15	10	25	59	12	1	2	3	20
1976–77	Ottawa 67's	OMJHL	66	35	52	87	80	19	10	14	24	39
1977–78	Ottawa 67's	OMJHL	50	41	60	101	99	16	9	13	22	36
1978–79	Chicago Black Hawks	NHL	36	7	16	23	30	4	0	0	0	0
1978–79	New Brunswick Hawks	AHL	17	3	5	8	14	—	—	—	—	—
1979–80	Chicago Black Hawks	NHL	74	13	12	25	50	7	0	3	3	10
1980–81	Chicago Black Hawks	NHL	78	24	35	59	86	3	0	0	0	0
1981–82	Chicago Black Hawks	NHL	74	20	30	50	85	12	3	1	5	15
1982–83	Chicago Black Hawks	NHL	64	14	9	23	63	13	1	3	4	10
1983–84	Chicago Black Hawks	NHL	32	1	4	5	21	—	—	—	—	—
1983–84	New Jersey Devils	NHL	37	18	10	28	27	—	—	—	—	—
1984–85	New Jersey Devils	NHL	71	19	29	48	30	—	—	—	—	—
1985–86	New Jersey Devils	NHL	59	9	17	26	47	—	—	—	—	—
1986–87	Detroit Red Wings	NHL	77	12	14	26	124	12	0	1	1	16
1987–88	Detroit Red Wings	NHL	62	12	13	25	94	13	1	0	1	26
1988–89	Detroit Red Wings	NHL	42	5	9	14	62	1	0	0	0	0
1988–89	Adirondack Red Wings	AHL	14	7	4	11	24	—	—	—	—	—
NHL totals			706	154	198	352	719	65	5	8	13	77

Preceded by Doug Wilson	Chicago Black Hawks first-round draft pick 1978	Succeeded by Keith Brown
