= Eric Germain =

Canadian ice hockey player

- Born: June 26, 1966 (age 58); Quebec City, Quebec, Canada
- Height: 6 ft 1 in (185 cm)
- Weight: 195 lb (88 kg; 13 st 13 lb)
- Position: Defence
- Caught: Left
- Played for: Los Angeles Kings
- NHL draft: Undrafted
- Playing career: 1987–2001

Eric Germain (born June 26, 1966) is a Canadian former professional hockey player who played for the Los Angeles Kings in the National Hockey League. As a youth, he played in the 1979 Quebec International Pee-Wee Hockey Tournament with a minor ice hockey team from Sainte-Foy, Quebec City.

== Career statistics ==
			Regular season					Playoffs
Season	Team	League	GP	G	A	Pts	PIM	GP	G	A	Pts	PIM
1981–82	Sainte-Foy Gouverneurs	QMAAA	45	0	1	1	6	—	—	—	—	—
1982–83	Sainte-Foy Gouverneurs	QMAAA	45	3	9	12	16	5	1	1	2	2
1983–84	Saint-Jean Castors	QMJHL	57	2	16	18	60	4	1	0	1	6
1984–85	Saint-Jean Castors	QMJHL	67	10	32	42	250	5	4	0	4	19
1985–86	Saint-Jean Castors	QMJHL	66	5	38	43	185	10	0	6	6	56
1986–87	Fredericton Express	AHL	44	2	8	10	28	—	—	—	—	—
1986–87	Flint Spirits	IHL	21	0	2	2	23	—	—	—	—	—
1987–88	New Haven Nighthawks	AHL	69	0	10	10	0	—	—	—	—	—
1987–88	Los Angeles Kings	NHL	4	0	1	1	13	1	0	0	0	4
1988–89	New Haven Nighthawks	AHL	55	0	9	9	93	17	0	3	3	23
1989–90	New Haven Nighthawks	AHL	59	3	12	15	112	—	—	—	—	—
1990–91	Binghamton Rangers	AHL	60	4	10	14	144	10	0	1	1	14
1991–92	Moncton Hawks	AHL	3	0	2	2	4	—	—	—	—	—
1991–92	Binghamton Rangers	AHL	47	3	6	9	86	3	0	0	0	0
1993–94	Richmond Renegades	ECHL	56	3	16	19	192	—	—	—	—	—
1993–94	Binghamton Rangers	AHL	3	0	0	0	6	—	—	—	—	—
1994–95	Richmond Renegades	ECHL	10	0	2	2	55	—	—	—	—	—
1994–95	Rochester Americans	AHL	18	1	7	8	13	5	0	2	2	18
1995–96	Erie Panthers	ECHL	67	4	13	17	245	—	—	—	—	—
1996–97	Columbus Cottonmouths	CHL	66	7	15	22	176	3	0	0	0	2
1997–98	Columbus Cottonmouths	CHL	57	0	5	5	113	13	0	1	1	10
2000–01	New Haven Knights	UHL	7	0	1	1	33	—	—	—	—	—
NHL totals			4	0	1	1	13	1	0	0	0	4
AHL totals			358	13	64	77	486	35	0	6	6	55
ECHL totals			133	7	31	38	492	—	—	—	—	—
