= Mark LaVarre =

American ice hockey player (born 1965)

- Born: February 21, 1965 (age 60) Chicago, Illinois, U.S.
- Height: 5 ft 11 in (180 cm)
- Weight: 170 lb (77 kg; 12 st 2 lb)
- Position: Right wing
- Shot: Right
- Played for: Chicago Blackhawks; Zürcher SC
- National team: United States
- NHL draft: 119th overall, 1983; Chicago Blackhawks
- Playing career: 1985–1990

Mark J. LaVarre (born February 21, 1965) is an American former professional ice hockey player, who played 65 games in the National Hockey League with the Chicago Blackhawks from 1985 to 1988. The rest of his career, lasted from 1985 to 1990, and was mainly spent in the minor leagues. Internationally he played for the United States at the 1984 World Junior Championships.

LaVarre was born in Chicago, Illinois. As a youth, he played in the 1978 Quebec International Pee-Wee Hockey Tournament with a minor ice hockey team from Chicago.

== Career statistics ==
=== Regular season and playoffs ===
			Regular season					Playoffs
Season	Team	League	GP	G	A	Pts	PIM	GP	G	A	Pts	PIM
1980–81	Glenbrook North High School	HS-IL	—	—	—	—	—	—	—	—	—	—
1981–82	Glenbrook North High School	HS-IL	—	—	—	—	—	—	—	—	—	—
1982–83	Stratford Cullitons	MWJHL	40	33	62	95	88	—	—	—	—	—
1983–84	North Bay Centennials	OHL	41	19	22	41	15	—	—	—	—	—
1984–85	Windsor Compuware Spitfires	OHL	46	15	30	45	30	4	0	0	0	0
1985–86	Chicago Blackhawks	NHL	2	0	0	0	0	—	—	—	—	—
1985–86	Nova Scotia Oilers	AHL	62	15	19	34	32	—	—	—	—	—
1986–87	Chicago Blackhawks	NHL	58	8	15	23	33	—	—	—	—	—
1986–87	Nova Scotia Oilers	AHL	17	12	8	20	8	—	—	—	—	—
1987–88	Chicago Blackhawks	NHL	18	1	1	2	25	1	0	0	0	2
1987–88	Saginaw Hawks	IHL	39	27	18	45	121	5	4	3	7	36
1988–89	Binghamton Whalers	AHL	37	20	21	41	70	—	—	—	—	—
1989–90	Zürcher SC	NLA	7	1	4	5	36	—	—	—	—	—
AHL totals			116	47	48	95	110	—	—	—	—	—
NHL totals			78	9	16	25	58	1	0	0	0	2

=== International ===
Year	Team	Event	GP	G	A	Pts	PIM
1984	United States	WJC	7	1	1	2	14
Junior totals			7	1	1	2	14
