= Keith Brown (ice hockey) =

Canadian ice hockey player (born 1960)

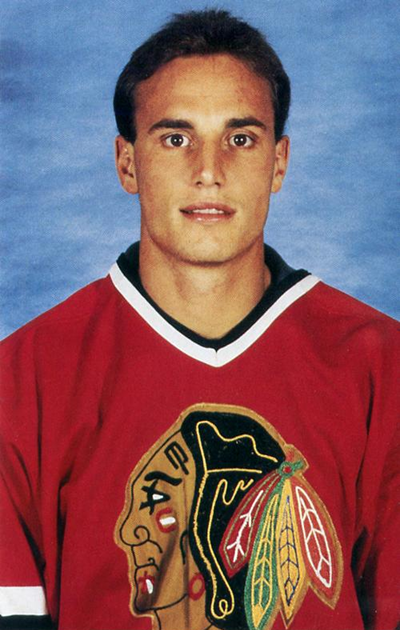
- Brown in 1986 photo
- Born: May 6, 1960 (age 66) Corner Brook, Newfoundland, Canada
- Height: 6 ft 1 in (185 cm)
- Weight: 196 lb (89 kg; 14 st 0 lb)
- Position: Defence
- Shot: Right
- Played for: Chicago Blackhawks; Florida Panthers
- NHL draft: 7th overall, 1979; Chicago Black Hawks
- Playing career: 1979–1995

Keith Jeffrey Brown (born May 6, 1960) is a Canadian former professional ice hockey defenceman who played sixteen seasons in the National Hockey League from 1979 until 1995. His first fourteen seasons were played with the Chicago Black Hawks. He helped the Blackhawks reach the 1992 Stanley Cup Final, but missed the final round with an injury.

== Playing career ==
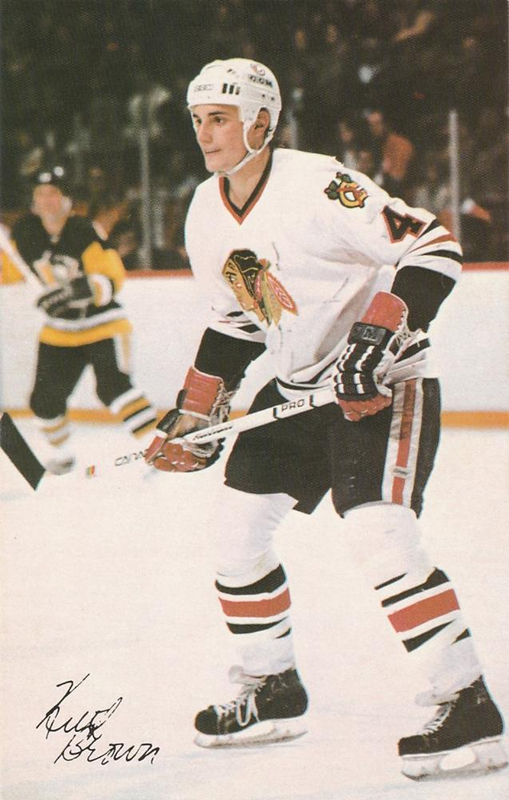
1981 in-action shot of Brown for Chicago Black Hawks

Brown was drafted as the seventh overall pick by the Black Hawks in the 1979 NHL entry draft. Reportedly, Boston Bruins general manager Harry Sinden was eager to select Brown with Boston's eighth overall pick but had to change his plans when Brown was selected by Chicago. Sinden's "Plan B" ended up being future Hall Of Fame defenceman Ray Bourque, who was selected by Boston immediately after Brown.

Known for his competitiveness, Brown helped Chicago reach the Stanley Cup Final in 1992. Late in his career, Brown was dealt to the expansion Florida Panthers in exchange for Darin Kimble. He played 876 career NHL games, scoring 68 goals and 274 assists for 342 points.

== Personal life ==
According to a 2006 issue of The Hockey News, Brown currently lives in Georgia, working as a network analyst. He has been married to wife Debbie for 27 years, and has four children: Cody, Katie, Christy, and Casey. His charities include Hockey Ministries International and Christian Missions.

== Career statistics ==
=== Regular season and playoffs ===
			Regular season					Playoffs
Season	Team	League	GP	G	A	Pts	PIM	GP	G	A	Pts	PIM
1976–77	Fort Saskatchewan Traders	AJHL	59	14	61	75	14	—	—	—	—	—
1976–77	Portland Winter Hawks	WCHL	2	0	0	0	0	—	—	—	—	—
1977–78	Portland Winter Hawks	WCHL	72	11	53	64	51	8	0	3	3	2
1978–79	Portland Winter Hawks	WHL	70	11	85	96	75	25	3	30	33	21
1979–80	Chicago Black Hawks	NHL	76	2	18	20	27	6	0	0	0	4
1980–81	Chicago Black Hawks	NHL	80	9	34	43	80	3	0	2	2	2
1981–82	Chicago Black Hawks	NHL	33	4	20	24	26	4	0	2	2	5
1982–83	Chicago Black Hawks	NHL	50	4	27	31	20	7	0	0	0	11
1983–84	Chicago Black Hawks	NHL	74	10	25	35	94	5	0	1	1	10
1984–85	Chicago Black Hawks	NHL	56	1	22	23	55	11	2	7	9	31
1985–86	Chicago Black Hawks	NHL	70	11	29	40	87	3	0	1	1	9
1986–87	Chicago Blackhawks	NHL	73	4	23	27	86	4	0	1	1	6
1987–88	Chicago Blackhawks	NHL	24	3	6	9	45	5	0	2	2	10
1988–89	Chicago Blackhawks	NHL	74	2	16	18	84	13	1	3	4	25
1989–90	Chicago Blackhawks	NHL	67	5	20	25	87	18	0	4	4	43
1990–91	Chicago Blackhawks	NHL	45	1	10	11	55	6	1	0	1	8
1991–92	Chicago Blackhawks	NHL	57	6	10	16	69	14	0	8	8	18
1992–93	Chicago Blackhawks	NHL	33	2	6	8	39	4	0	1	1	2
1993–94	Florida Panthers	NHL	51	4	8	12	60	—	—	—	—	—
1994–95	Florida Panthers	NHL	13	0	0	0	2	—	—	—	—	—
NHL totals			876	68	274	342	916	103	4	32	36	184

=== International ===
Year	Team	Event	Result	GP	G	A	Pts	PIM
1979	Canada	WJC	5th	5	0	2	2	0
Junior totals				5	0	2	2	0

== Awards ==
- WCHL Second All-Star Team – 1978
- WHL First All-Star Team – 1979

Awards and achievements
Preceded by Tim Higgins	Chicago Black Hawks first-round draft pick 1979	Succeeded by Denis Savard
