= Peter Bakovic =

Canadian ice hockey player

- Born: January 31, 1965 (age 60); Thunder Bay, Ontario, Canada
- Height: 6 ft 2 in (188 cm)
- Weight: 200 lb (91 kg; 14 st 4 lb)
- Position: Left wing
- Shot: Right
- Played for: Vancouver Canucks
- NHL draft: Undrafted
- Playing career: 1985–1991

Peter George "Pete" Bakovic (born January 31, 1965, in Thunder Bay, Ontario) is a retired professional ice hockey left wing who played briefly in the National Hockey League in the late 1980s for the Vancouver Canucks.
