= List of Winnipeg Jets (1972–1996) draft picks =

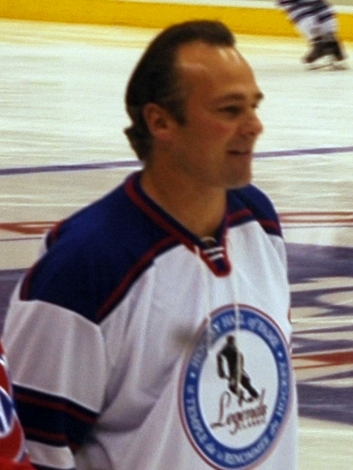
The Jets selected Dale Hawerchuk 1st overall in the 1981 NHL entry draft.

This is a list of ice hockey players who were drafted in the National Hockey League Entry Draft by the Winnipeg Jets (1972–1996). It includes every player who was drafted, regardless of whether they played for the team.

== Key ==
# Played at least one game with the Jets
↑ Spent entire NHL career with the Jets
(†) Inducted into the Hockey Hall of Fame
(‡) Number retired by the Jets

General terms and abbreviations
Term or abbreviation	Definition
Draft	The year that the player was selected
Round	The round of the draft in which the player was selected
Pick	The overall position in the draft at which the player was selected
S	Supplemental draft selection

Position abbreviations
Abbreviation	Definition
G	Goaltender
D	Defence
LW	Left Wing
C	Centre
RW	Right Wing
F	Forward

Abbreviations for statistical columns
Abbreviation	Definition
Pos	Position
GP	Games played
G	Goals
A	Assists
Pts	Points
PIM	Penalties in minutes
W	Wins
L	Losses
T	Ties
OT	Overtime/shootout losses
GAA	Goals against average
—	Does not apply

== Draft picks ==
=== WHA ===
Statistics show each player's career regular season totals in the WHA.

Draft	Round	Pick	Player	Nationality	Pos	GP	G	A	Pts	PIM	W	L	T	GAA
1973	1	11	Ron Andruff	Canada	C	—	—	—	—	—	—	—	—	—
1973	2	25	Keith Mackie	Canada	D	—	—	—	—	—	—	—	—	—
1973	3	37	Kelly Pratt↑	Canada	RW	46	4	6	10	50	—	—	—	—
1973	5	63	Randy Smith	Canada	LW	—	—	—	—	—	—	—	—	—
1973	6	76	Ron Kennedy	Canada	RW	—	—	—	—	—	—	—	—	—
1973	7	89	Jeff Jacques	Canada	RW	201	50	68	118	231	—	—	—	—
1973	8	101	Terry McDougall	Canada	C	—	—	—	—	—	—	—	—	—
1973	9	112	Russ Wiechnik	Canada	C	—	—	—	—	—	—	—	—	—
1973	10	121	Mike Kennedy	Canada	RW	—	—	—	—	—	—	—	—	—
1974	1	7	Randy Andreachuk↑	Canada	C	2	0	0	0	0	—	—	—	—
1974	2	22	Brian Engblom	Canada	D	—	—	—	—	—	—	—	—	—
1974	3	37	Kim MacDougall	Canada	D	—	—	—	—	—	—	—	—	—
1974	4	52	Boyd Anderson	Canada	LW	—	—	—	—	—	—	—	—	—
1974	5	66	Rick Uhrich	Canada	RW	—	—	—	—	—	—	—	—	—
1974	6	81	Dave Rooke	Canada	D	—	—	—	—	—	—	—	—	—
1974	7	96	Bob Ferguson	Canada	C	—	—	—	—	—	—	—	—	—
1974	8	111	John Duncan	Canada	D	—	—	—	—	—	—	—	—	—
1974	9	126	Wayne Wilhelm	Canada	G	—	—	—	—	—	—	—	—	—
1974	10	139	Mike Wanchuk	Canada	RW	—	—	—	—	—	—	—	—	—
1974	11	183	John Memryk	Canada	G	—	—	—	—	—	—	—	—	—
1974	12	196	Marcel Dumais	Canada	C	—	—	—	—	—	—	—	—	—
1974	19	236	Tom Wynne	Canada	G	—	—	—	—	—	—	—	—	—
1974	1	11	Danny Gare	Canada	F	—	—	—	—	—	—	—	—	—
1974	2	26	Gord McTavish	Canada	F	—	—	—	—	—	—	—	—	—
1974	2	27	Ron Ashton↑	Canada	LW	36	1	2	3	66	—	—	—	—
1975	1	8	Brad Gassoff	Canada	LW	—	—	—	—	—	—	—	—	—
1975	2	22	Russ Anderson	United States	D	—	—	—	—	—	—	—	—	—
1975	3	38	Glen Richardson	Canada	LW	—	—	—	—	—	—	—	—	—
1975	4	53	Ted Long	Canada	LW	1	0	0	0	0	—	—	—	—
1975	6	81	Nick Bobstock	Canada		—	—	—	—	—	—	—	—	—
1975	9	119	Jim Gustafson	Canada	LW	—	—	—	—	—	—	—	—	—
1975	10	132	Dag Bredberg	Sweden	F	—	—	—	—	—	—	—	—	—
1975	11	145	Emil Meszaros	Sweden	F	—	—	—	—	—	—	—	—	—
1975	12	156	Torbjorn Nilsson	Sweden	F	—	—	—	—	—	—	—	—	—
1975	13	166	Bengt Lundholm	Sweden	F	—	—	—	—	—	—	—	—	—
1976	1	9	Thomas Gradin	Sweden	F	—	—	—	—	—	—	—	—	—
1976	2	17	Clayton Pachal	Canada	C	—	—	—	—	—	—	—	—	—
1976	2	20	Tom Rowe	United States	RW	—	—	—	—	—	—	—	—	—
1976	3	33	Steve Clippingdale	Canada	LW	—	—	—	—	—	—	—	—	—
1976	4	45	Goran Lindblom	Sweden	D	—	—	—	—	—	—	—	—	—
1976	5	57	Doug Johnston	Canada	D	—	—	—	—	—	—	—	—	—
1976	6	69	Fred Berry	Canada	C	—	—	—	—	—	—	—	—	—
1976	7	81	Greg Craig	Canada	F	—	—	—	—	—	—	—	—	—
1976	8	92	Brian Granfield	Canada	D	—	—	—	—	—	—	—	—	—
1976	9	103	Anders Hakansson	Sweden	F	—	—	—	—	—	—	—	—	—
1976	10	115	Jorgen Pettersson	Sweden	F	—	—	—	—	—	—	—	—	—
1977	1	3	Ron Duguay	Canada	C	—	—	—	—	—	—	—	—	—
1977	1	8	Miles Zaharko	Canada	D	—	—	—	—	—	—	—	—	—
1977	3	28	Mark Lofthouse	Canada	RW	—	—	—	—	—	—	—	—	—
1977	4	37	Don Laurence	Canada	C	—	—	—	—	—	—	—	—	—
1977	5	46	Bill Stewart	Canada	D	—	—	—	—	—	—	—	—	—
1977	6	55	Ric Seiling	Canada	RW	—	—	—	—	—	—	—	—	—
1977	7	64	Jim Hamilton	Canada	LW	—	—	—	—	—	—	—	—	—
1977	8	72	Warren Holmes	Canada	C	—	—	—	—	—	—	—	—	—
1977	9	80	Mike Keating	Canada	LW	—	—	—	—	—	—	—	—	—
1977	10	88	Murray Bannerman	Canada	G	—	—	—	—	—	—	—	—	—

=== NHL ===
Draft	Round	Pick	Player	Nationality	Pos	GP	G	A	Pts	PIM	W	L	T	OT	GAA
1979	1	19	Jimmy Mann#	Canada	RW	293	10	20	30	895	—	—	—	—	—
1979	2	40	Dave Christian#	United States	RW	1009	340	433	773	284	—	—	—	—	—
1979	3	61	Bill Whelton↑	United States	D	2	0	0	0	0	—	—	—	—	—
1979	4	82	Pat Daley↑	Canada	LW	12	1	0	1	13	—	—	—	—	—
1979	5	103	Thomas Steen↑‡	Sweden	C	950	264	553	817	753	—	—	—	—	—
1979	6	124	Tim Watters#	Canada	D	741	26	151	177	1289	—	—	—	—	—
1980	1	2	Dave Babych#	Canada	D	1195	142	581	723	970	—	—	—	—	—
1980	2	23	Moe Mantha#	United States	D	656	81	289	370	501	—	—	—	—	—
1980	3	44	Murray Eaves#	Canada	F	57	4	13	17	9	—	—	—	—	—
1980	4	65	Guy Fournier	Canada	F	—	—	—	—	—	—	—	—	—	—
1980	5	86	Glen Ostir	Canada	D	—	—	—	—	—	—	—	—	—	—
1980	6	107	Ron Loustel↑	Canada	G	1	0	0	0	0	0	1	0	—	10.00
1980	7	128	Brian Mullen#	United States	F	832	260	362	622	414	—	—	—	—	—
1980	7	135	Michael Lauen↑	United States	F	3	0	1	1	0	—	—	—	—	—
1980	8	149	Sandy Beadle↑	Canada	LW	6	1	0	1	2	—	—	—	—	—
1980	9	170	Ed Christian	United States	F	—	—	—	—	—	—	—	—	—	—
1980	10	191	Dave Chartier↑	Canada	C	1	0	0	0	0	—	—	—	—	—
1981	1	1	Dale Hawerchuk#†	Canada	C	1188	518	891	1409	740	—	—	—	—	—
1981	2	22	Scott Arniel#	Canada	LW	730	149	189	338	599	—	—	—	—	—
1981	3	43	Jyrki Seppa↑	Finland	D	13	0	2	2	6	—	—	—	—	—
1981	4	64	Kirk McCaskill	Canada	F	—	—	—	—	—	—	—	—	—	—
1981	5	85	Marc Behrend↑	United States	G	38	0	0	0	0	12	19	3	—	4.82
1981	6	106	Bob O'Connor	United States	G	—	—	—	—	—	—	—	—	—	—
1981	7	127	Peter Nilsson	Sweden	D	—	—	—	—	—	—	—	—	—	—
1981	8	148	Dan McFall↑	United States	D	9	0	1	1	0	—	—	—	—	—
1981	9	169	Greg Dick	United States	G	—	—	—	—	—	—	—	—	—	—
1981	10	190	Vladimir Kadlec	Czech Republic	D	—	—	—	—	—	—	—	—	—	—
1981	11	211	Dave Kirwin	United States	D	—	—	—	—	—	—	—	—	—	—
1982	1	12	Jim Kyte#	Canada	D	598	17	49	66	1342	—	—	—	—	—
1982	4	74	Tom Martin#	Canada	LW	92	12	11	23	259	—	—	—	—	—
1982	4	75	David Ellett#	Canada	D	1129	153	415	568	985	—	—	—	—	—
1982	5	96	Tim Mishler	United States	F	—	—	—	—	—	—	—	—	—	—
1982	7	138	Derek Ray	United States	RW	—	—	—	—	—	—	—	—	—	—
1982	8	159	Guy Gosselin↑	United States	D	5	0	0	0	6	—	—	—	—	—
1982	9	180	Tom Ward	United States	D	—	—	—	—	—	—	—	—	—	—
1982	10	201	Mike Savage	Canada	LW	—	—	—	—	—	—	—	—	—	—
1982	11	222	Bob Shaw	Canada	RW	—	—	—	—	—	—	—	—	—	—
1982	12	243	Jan Ericson	Sweden	F	—	—	—	—	—	—	—	—	—	—
1983	1	8	Andrew McBain#	Canada	RW	608	129	172	301	633	—	—	—	—	—
1983	1	14	Bobby Dollas#	Canada	D	646	42	96	138	467	—	—	—	—	—
1983	2	29	Brad Berry#	Canada	D	241	4	28	32	323	—	—	—	—	—
1983	3	43	Peter Taglianetti#	United States	D	451	18	74	92	1106	—	—	—	—	—
1983	4	69	Bob Essensa#	Canada	G	446	0	15	15	26	173	176	47	—	3.15
1983	5	89	Harry Armstrong	United States	D	—	—	—	—	—	—	—	—	—	—
1983	6	109	Joel Baillargeon#	Canada	LW	20	0	2	2	31	—	—	—	—	—
1983	7	129	Iain Duncan↑	Canada	LW	127	34	55	89	149	—	—	—	—	—
1983	8	149	Ron Pesetti	Canada	D	—	—	—	—	—	—	—	—	—	—
1983	9	169	Todd Flichel↑	Canada	D	6	0	1	1	4	—	—	—	—	—
1983	10	189	Kory Wright	United States	F	—	—	—	—	—	—	—	—	—	—
1983	11	209	Eric Cormier	Canada		—	—	—	—	—	—	—	—	—	—
1983	12	229	Jamie Husgen	United States	D	—	—	—	—	—	—	—	—	—	—
1984	2	30	Peter Douris#	Canada	RW	321	54	67	121	80	—	—	—	—	—
1984	4	68	Chris Mills	Canada	D	—	—	—	—	—	—	—	—	—	—
1984	4	72	Sean Clement	Canada	D	—	—	—	—	—	—	—	—	—	—
1984	5	93	Scott Schneider	United States	F	—	—	—	—	—	—	—	—	—	—
1984	5	99	Brent Severyn	Canada	D	328	10	30	40	825	—	—	—	—	—
1984	6	114	Gary Lorden	United States	D	—	—	—	—	—	—	—	—	—	—
1984	7	135	Luciano Borsato↑	Canada	C	203	35	55	90	113	—	—	—	—	—
1984	8	156	Brad Jones#	United States	LW	148	25	31	56	122	—	—	—	—	—
1984	9	177	Gord Whitaker	Canada	W	—	—	—	—	—	—	—	—	—	—
1984	10	197	Rick Forst	Canada	F	—	—	—	—	—	—	—	—	—	—
1984	11	218	Mike Warus	Canada	RW	—	—	—	—	—	—	—	—	—	—
1984	12	238	Jim Edmands	United States	G	—	—	—	—	—	—	—	—	—	—
1985	1	18	Ryan Stewart↑	Canada	C	3	1	0	1	0	—	—	—	—	—
1985	2	39	Roger Ohman	Sweden	D	—	—	—	—	—	—	—	—	—	—
1985	3	60	Daniel Berthiaume#	Canada	G	215	0	4	4	34	81	90	21	—	3.67
1985	4	81	Fredrik Olausson#	Sweden	D	1022	147	434	581	452	—	—	—	—	—
1985	5	102	John Borrell	United States	F	—	—	—	—	—	—	—	—	—	—
1985	6	123	Danton Cole#	United States	RW	318	58	60	118	125	—	—	—	—	—
1985	7	144	Brent Mowery	Canada	C	—	—	—	—	—	—	—	—	—	—
1985	8	165	Tom Draper#	Canada	G	53	0	3	3	4	19	23	5	—	3.70
1985	9	186	Neven Kardum	Canada	F	—	—	—	—	—	—	—	—	—	—
1985	10	207	Dave Quigley	Canada	G	—	—	—	—	—	—	—	—	—	—
1985	11	228	Chris Norton	Canada	D	—	—	—	—	—	—	—	—	—	—
1985	12	249	Anssi Melametsa↑	Finland	F	27	0	3	3	2	—	—	—	—	—
1986	1	8	Pat Elynuik#	Canada	RW	506	154	188	342	459	—	—	—	—	—
1986	2	29	Teppo Numminen#	Finland	D	1372	117	520	637	513	—	—	—	—	—
1986	3	50	Esa Palosaari	Finland	F	—	—	—	—	—	—	—	—	—	—
1986	4	71	Hannu Jarvenpaa↑	Finland	RW	114	11	26	37	83	—	—	—	—	—
1986	5	92	Craig Endean↑	Canada	LW	2	0	1	1	0	—	—	—	—	—
1986	6	113	Rob Bateman	Canada	D	—	—	—	—	—	—	—	—	—	—
1986	8	155	Frank Furian	Canada	G	—	—	—	—	—	—	—	—	—	—
1986	9	176	Mark Green	United States	LW	—	—	—	—	—	—	—	—	—	—
1986	10	197	John Blue	United States	G	46	0	2	2	13	16	18	7	—	3.00
1986	11	218	Matt Cote	Canada	D	—	—	—	—	—	—	—	—	—	—
1986	12	239	Arto Blomsten#	Sweden	D	25	0	4	4	8	—	—	—	—	—
1986	S	11	Chris Levasseur	United States	F	—	—	—	—	—	—	—	—	—	—
1987	1	16	Bryan Marchment#	Canada	D	926	40	142	182	2307	—	—	—	—	—
1987	2	37	Patrik Erickson	Sweden	C	—	—	—	—	—	—	—	—	—	—
1987	4	79	Don McLennan	Canada	D	—	—	—	—	—	—	—	—	—	—
1987	5	96	Ken Gernander	United States	RW	12	2	3	5	6	—	—	—	—	—
1987	5	100	Darrin Amundson	United States	F	—	—	—	—	—	—	—	—	—	—
1987	6	121	Joe Harwell	United States	D	—	—	—	—	—	—	—	—	—	—
1987	7	142	Tod Hartje	United States	C	—	—	—	—	—	—	—	—	—	—
1987	8	163	Markku Kyllonen↑	Finland	LW	9	0	2	2	2	—	—	—	—	—
1987	9	184	Jim Fernholz	United States	RW	—	—	—	—	—	—	—	—	—	—
1987	11	226	Roger Rougelot	United States	G	—	—	—	—	—	—	—	—	—	—
1987	12	247	Hans-Goran Elo	Sweden	G	—	—	—	—	—	—	—	—	—	—
1987	S	17	Rob Fowler	United States	F	—	—	—	—	—	—	—	—	—	—
1988	1	10	Teemu Selanne#†	Finland	RW	1451	684	773	1457	660	—	—	—	—	—
1988	2	31	Russ Romaniuk#	Canada	LW	102	13	14	27	63	—	—	—	—	—
1988	3	52	Stephane Beauregard#	Canada	G	90	0	2	2	6	19	39	11	—	3.65
1988	4	73	Brian Hunt	Canada	C	—	—	—	—	—	—	—	—	—	—
1988	5	94	Tony Joseph↑	Canada	RW	2	1	0	1	0	—	—	—	—	—
1988	5	101	Ben Lebeau	Canada	F	—	—	—	—	—	—	—	—	—	—
1988	6	115	Ron Jones	United States	RW	—	—	—	—	—	—	—	—	—	—
1988	7	127	Markus Akerblom	Sweden	RW	—	—	—	—	—	—	—	—	—	—
1988	7	136	Jukka Marttila	Finland	D	—	—	—	—	—	—	—	—	—	—
1988	8	157	Mark Smith	United States	LW	—	—	—	—	—	—	—	—	—	—
1988	9	178	Mike Helber	United States	C	—	—	—	—	—	—	—	—	—	—
1988	10	199	Pavel Kostitshkin	Russia	RW	—	—	—	—	—	—	—	—	—	—
1988	11	220	Kevin Heise	Canada	F	—	—	—	—	—	—	—	—	—	—
1988	12	241	Kyle Galloway	Canada	D	—	—	—	—	—	—	—	—	—	—
1988	S	15	Mike O'Neill#	Canada	G	21	0	0	0	0	0	9	2	—	4.28
1989	1	4	Stu Barnes#	Canada	C	1136	261	336	597	438	—	—	—	—	—
1989	2	25	Dan Ratushny	Canada	D	1	0	1	1	2	—	—	—	—	—
1989	3	46	Jason Cirone↑	Canada	C	3	0	0	0	2	—	—	—	—	—
1989	3	62	Kris Draper#	Canada	C	1157	161	203	364	790	—	—	—	—	—
1989	4	64	Mark Brownschidle	United States	D	—	—	—	—	—	—	—	—	—	—
1989	4	69	Allain Roy	Canada	G	—	—	—	—	—	—	—	—	—	—
1989	6	109	Dan Bylsma	United States	RW	429	19	43	62	184	—	—	—	—	—
1989	7	130	Pekka Peltola	Finland	F	—	—	—	—	—	—	—	—	—	—
1989	7	131	Doug Evans	United States	D	—	—	—	—	—	—	—	—	—	—
1989	8	151	Jim Solly	Canada	LW	—	—	—	—	—	—	—	—	—	—
1989	9	172	Stephane Gauvin	Canada	W	—	—	—	—	—	—	—	—	—	—
1989	10	193	Joe Larson	United States	C	—	—	—	—	—	—	—	—	—	—
1989	11	214	Brad Podiak	United States	C	—	—	—	—	—	—	—	—	—	—
1989	12	235	Evgeny Davydov#	Russia	LW	155	40	39	70	120	—	—	—	—	—
1989	12	240	Sergei Kharin↑	Russia	C	7	2	3	5	2	—	—	—	—	—
1989	S	4	Peter Hankinson	United States	C	—	—	—	—	—	—	—	—	—	—
1989	S	9	Jon Anderson	United States	LW	—	—	—	—	—	—	—	—	—	—
1990	1	19	Keith Tkachuk#	United States	C	1201	538	527	1065	2219	—	—	—	—	—
1990	2	35	Mike Muller	United States	D	—	—	—	—	—	—	—	—	—	—
1990	4	74	Roman Meluzin	Russia	RW	—	—	—	—	—	—	—	—	—	—
1990	4	75	Scott Levins#	United States	RW	124	13	20	33	316	—	—	—	—	—
1990	4	77	Alexei Zhamnov#	Russia	C	807	249	470	719	668	—	—	—	—	—
1990	5	98	Craig Martin#	Canada	RW	21	0	1	1	24	—	—	—	—	—
1990	6	119	Daniel Jardemyr	Sweden	D	—	—	—	—	—	—	—	—	—	—
1990	7	140	John Lilley	United States	RW	23	3	8	11	13	—	—	—	—	—
1990	8	161	Henrik Andersson	Sweden	D	—	—	—	—	—	—	—	—	—	—
1990	9	182	Rauli Raitanen	Finland	C	—	—	—	—	—	—	—	—	—	—
1990	10	203	Mika Alatalo	Finland	LW	152	17	29	46	58	—	—	—	—	—
1990	11	224	Sergei Selyanin	Russia	D	—	—	—	—	—	—	—	—	—	—
1990	12	245	Keith Morris	Canada	LW	—	—	—	—	—	—	—	—	—	—
1990	S	19	Mark Richards	United States	G	—	—	—	—	—	—	—	—	—	—
1991	1	5	Aaron Ward	Canada	D	839	44	107	151	736	—	—	—	—	—
1991	3	49	Dmitri Filimonov	Russia	D	30	1	4	5	18	—	—	—	—	—
1991	5	91	Juha Ylonen	Finland	C	341	26	76	102	90	—	—	—	—	—
1991	5	99	Yan Kaminsky#	Russia	LW	26	3	2	5	4	—	—	—	—	—
1991	6	115	Jeff Sebastian	Canada	D	—	—	—	—	—	—	—	—	—	—
1991	8	159	Jeff Ricciardi	Canada	D	—	—	—	—	—	—	—	—	—	—
1991	9	181	Sean Gauthier	Canada	G	1	0	0	0	0	0	0	0	—	0.00
1991	10	203	Igor Ulanov#	Russia	D	739	27	135	162	1151	—	—	—	—	—
1991	11	225	Jason Jennings	Canada	F	—	—	—	—	—	—	—	—	—	—
1991	12	247	Sergei Sorokin	Russia	D	—	—	—	—	—	—	—	—	—	—
1991	S	5	Brad Mullahy	United States	G	—	—	—	—	—	—	—	—	—	—
1991	S	11	Jeff Jestadt	United States	LW	—	—	—	—	—	—	—	—	—	—
1992	1	17	Sergei Bautin#	Russia	D	132	5	25	30	176	—	—	—	—	—
1992	2	27	Boris Mironov#	Russia	D	716	76	231	307	891	—	—	—	—	—
1992	3	60	Jeremy Stevenson	Canada	LW	207	19	19	38	451	—	—	—	—	—
1992	4	84	Mark Visheau#	Canada	D	29	1	3	4	107	—	—	—	—	—
1992	6	132	Alexander Alexeev	Ukraine	D	—	—	—	—	—	—	—	—	—	—
1992	7	155	Artur Oktyabrev	Russia	D	—	—	—	—	—	—	—	—	—	—
1992	7	156	Andrei Raisky	Kazakhstan	C	—	—	—	—	—	—	—	—	—	—
1992	9	204	Nikolai Khabibulin#	Russia	G	799	0	18	18	134	333	334	58	39	2.72
1992	10	228	Evgeny Garanin	Russia	RW	—	—	—	—	—	—	—	—	—	—
1992	10	229	Teemu Numminen	Finland	F	—	—	—	—	—	—	—	—	—	—
1992	11	252	Andrei Karpovtsev	Russia	F	—	—	—	—	—	—	—	—	—	—
1992	11	254	Ivan Vologjaninov	Ukraine	RW	—	—	—	—	—	—	—	—	—	—
1993	1	15	Mats Lindgren	Sweden	C	387	54	74	128	146	—	—	—	—	—
1993	2	31	Scott Langkow#	Canada	G	20	0	0	0	0	3	12	1	—	4.33
1993	2	43	Alexei Budayev	Russia	C	—	—	—	—	—	—	—	—	—	—
1993	4	79	Ruslan Batyrshin	Russia	D	2	0	0	0	6	—	—	—	—	—
1993	4	93	Ravil Gusmanov↑	Russia	LW	4	0	0	0	0	—	—	—	—	—
1993	5	119	Larry Courville	Canada	LW	33	1	2	3	16	—	—	—	—	—
1993	6	145	Michal Grosek#	Czech Republic	RW	526	84	137	221	509	—	—	—	—	—
1993	7	171	Martin Woods	Canada	D	—	—	—	—	—	—	—	—	—	—
1993	8	197	Adrian Murray	Canada	D	—	—	—	—	—	—	—	—	—	—
1993	9	217	Vladimir Potapov	Belarus	F	—	—	—	—	—	—	—	—	—	—
1993	9	223	Ilya Stashenkov	Russia	D	—	—	—	—	—	—	—	—	—	—
1993	9	228	Harijs Vitolinsh↑	Latvia	C	8	0	0	0	4	—	—	—	—	—
1993	11	285	Russell Hewson	Canada	C	—	—	—	—	—	—	—	—	—	—
1994	2	30	Deron Quint#	United States	D	463	46	97	143	166	—	—	—	—	—
1994	3	56	Dorian Anneck	Canada	RW	—	—	—	—	—	—	—	—	—	—
1994	3	58	Tavis Hansen#	Canada	RW	34	2	1	3	16	—	—	—	—	—
1994	4	82	Steve Cheredaryk	Canada	D	—	—	—	—	—	—	—	—	—	—
1994	5	108	Craig Mills#	Canada	RW	31	0	5	5	36	—	—	—	—	—
1994	6	143	Steve Vezina	Canada	G	—	—	—	—	—	—	—	—	—	—
1994	6	146	Chris Kibermanis	Canada	F	—	—	—	—	—	—	—	—	—	—
1994	8	186	Ramil Saifullin	Russia	C	—	—	—	—	—	—	—	—	—	—
1994	9	212	Henrik Smangs	Sweden	G	—	—	—	—	—	—	—	—	—	—
1994	10	238	Mike Mader	United States	D	—	—	—	—	—	—	—	—	—	—
1994	11	264	Jason Issel	Canada	LW	—	—	—	—	—	—	—	—	—	—
1994	S	4	Randy Stevens	United States	RW	—	—	—	—	—	—	—	—	—	—
1995	1	7	Shane Doan#	Canada	C	1540	402	570	972	1353	—	—	—	—	—
1995	2	32	Marc Chouinard	Canada	C	320	37	41	78	123	—	—	—	—	—
1995	2	34	Jason Doig#	Canada	D	158	6	18	24	285	—	—	—	—	—
1995	3	67	Brad Isbister	Canada	LW	541	106	116	222	615	—	—	—	—	—
1995	4	84	Justin Kurtz	Canada	D	27	3	5	8	14	—	—	—	—	—
1995	5	121	Brian Elder	Canada	G	—	—	—	—	—	—	—	—	—	—
1995	6	136	Sylvain Daigle	Canada	G	—	—	—	—	—	—	—	—	—	—
1995	7	162	Paul Traynor	Canada	D	—	—	—	—	—	—	—	—	—	—
1995	8	188	Jaroslav Obsut	Russia	D	7	0	0	0	2	—	—	—	—	—
1995	8	189	Fredrik Loven	Sweden	D	—	—	—	—	—	—	—	—	—	—
1995	9	214	Rob DeCiantis	Canada	C	—	—	—	—	—	—	—	—	—	—

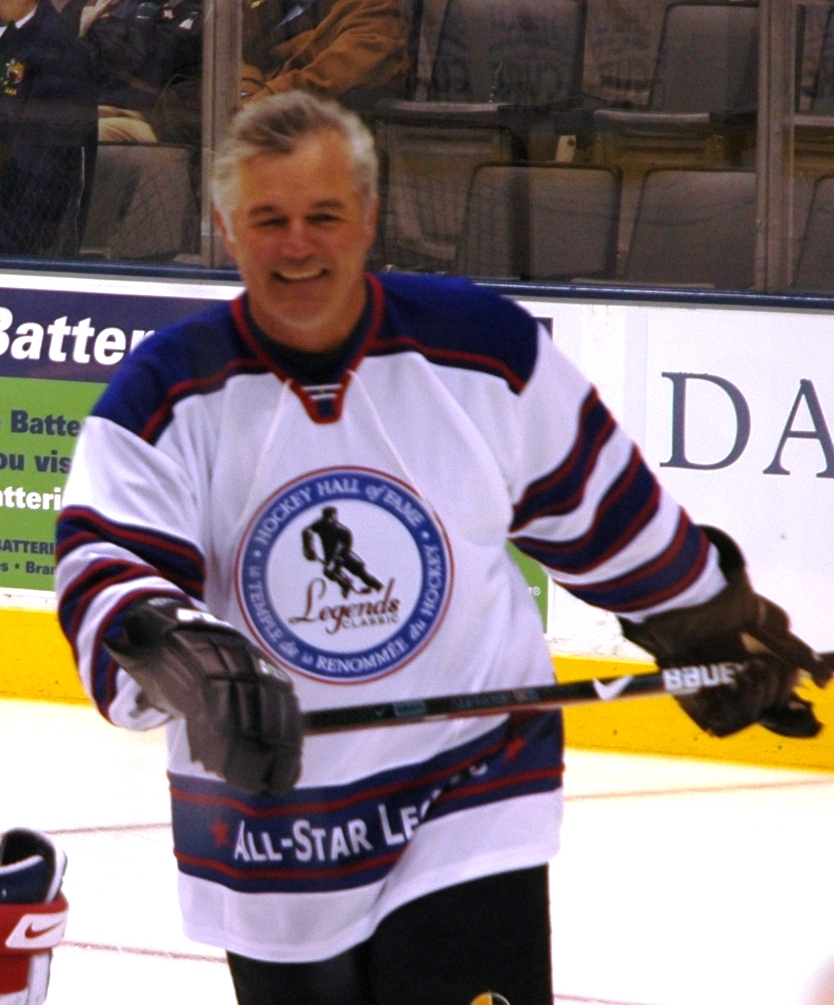
The Jets selected David Ellett 75th overall in the 1982 NHL entry draft.

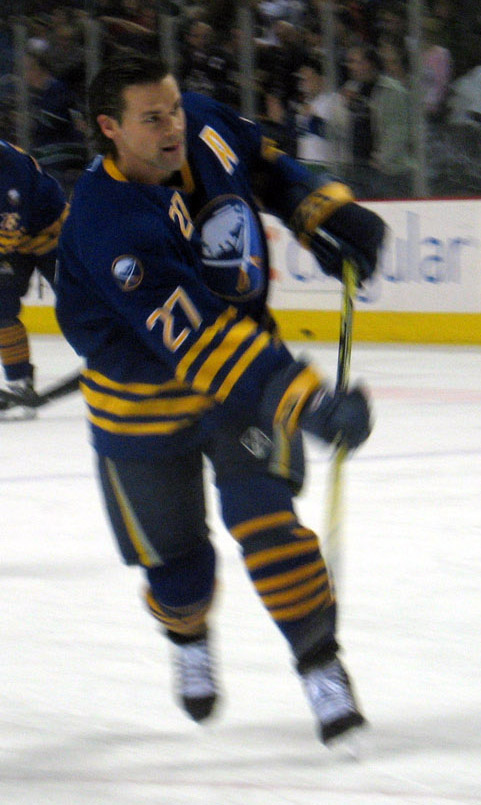
The Jets selected Teppo Numminen 29th overall in the 1986 NHL entry draft.

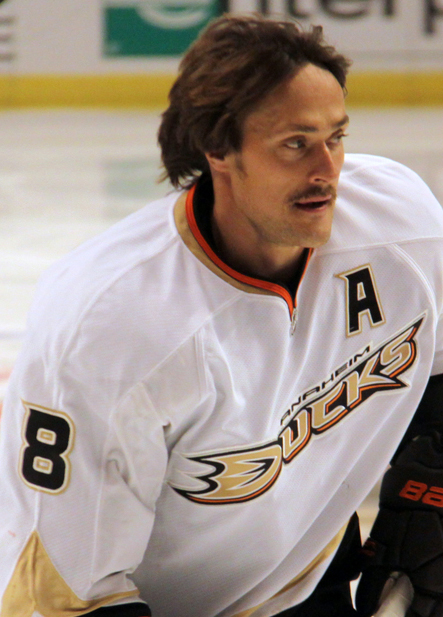
The Jets selected Teemu Selanne 10th overall in the 1988 NHL entry draft.

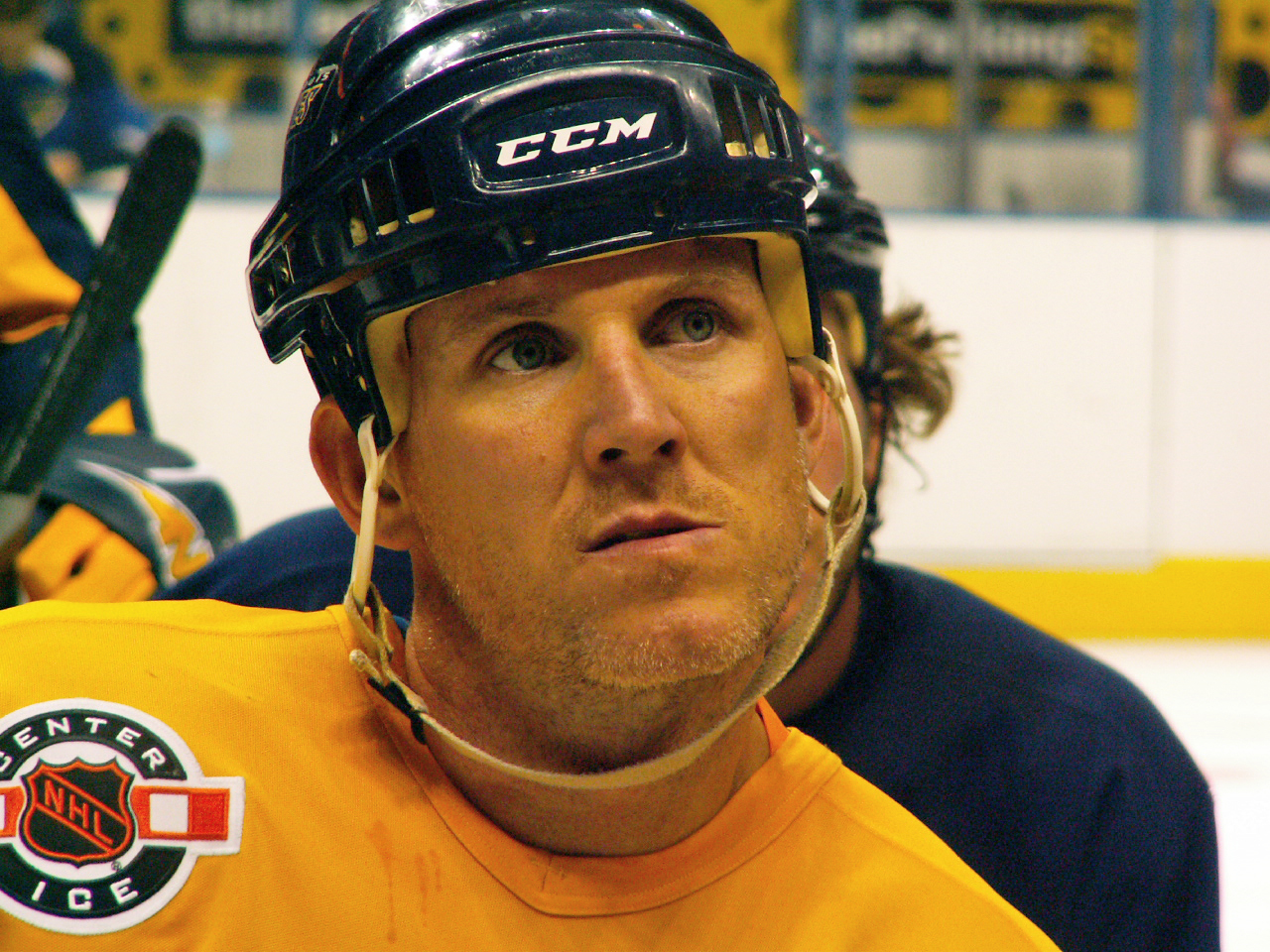
The Jets selected Keith Tkachuk 19th overall in the 1990 NHL entry draft.

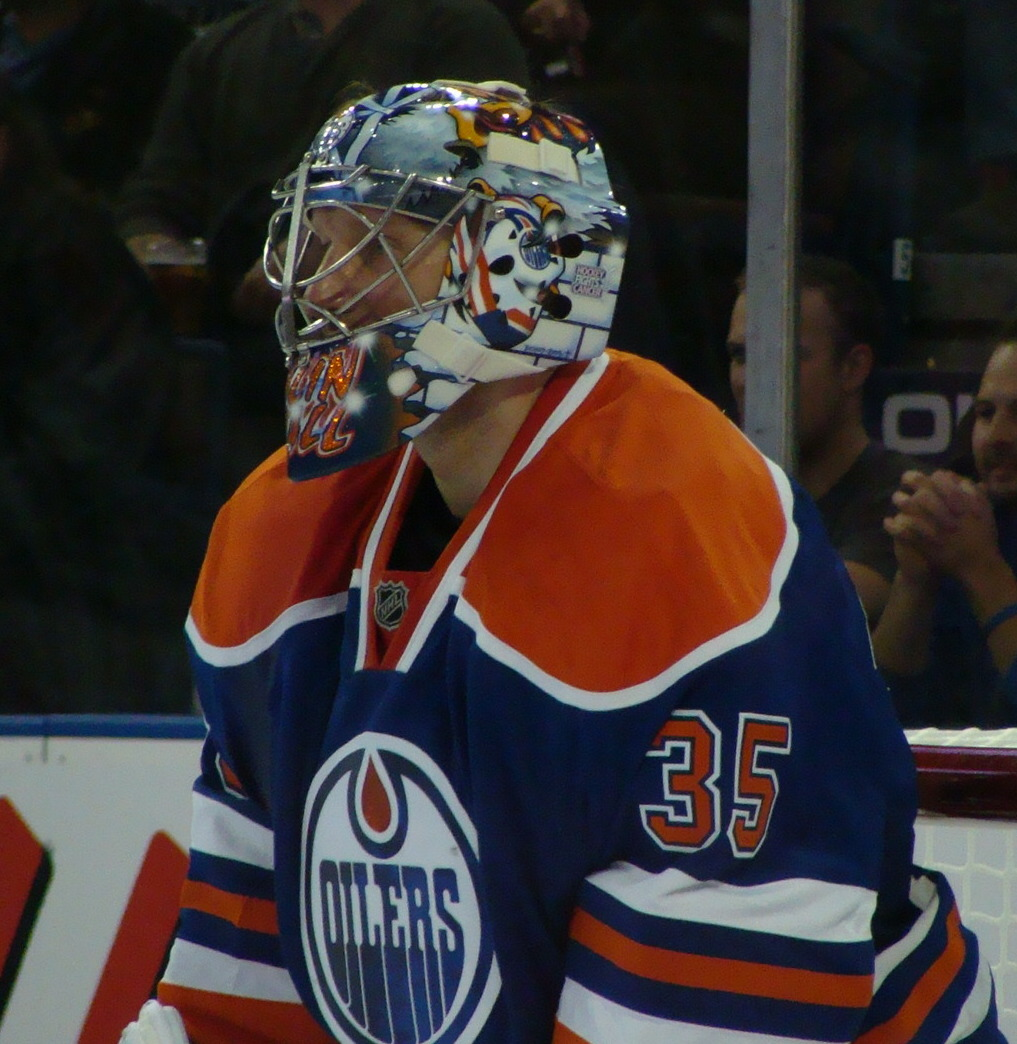
The Jets selected Nikolai Khabibulin 204th overall in the 1992 NHL entry draft.

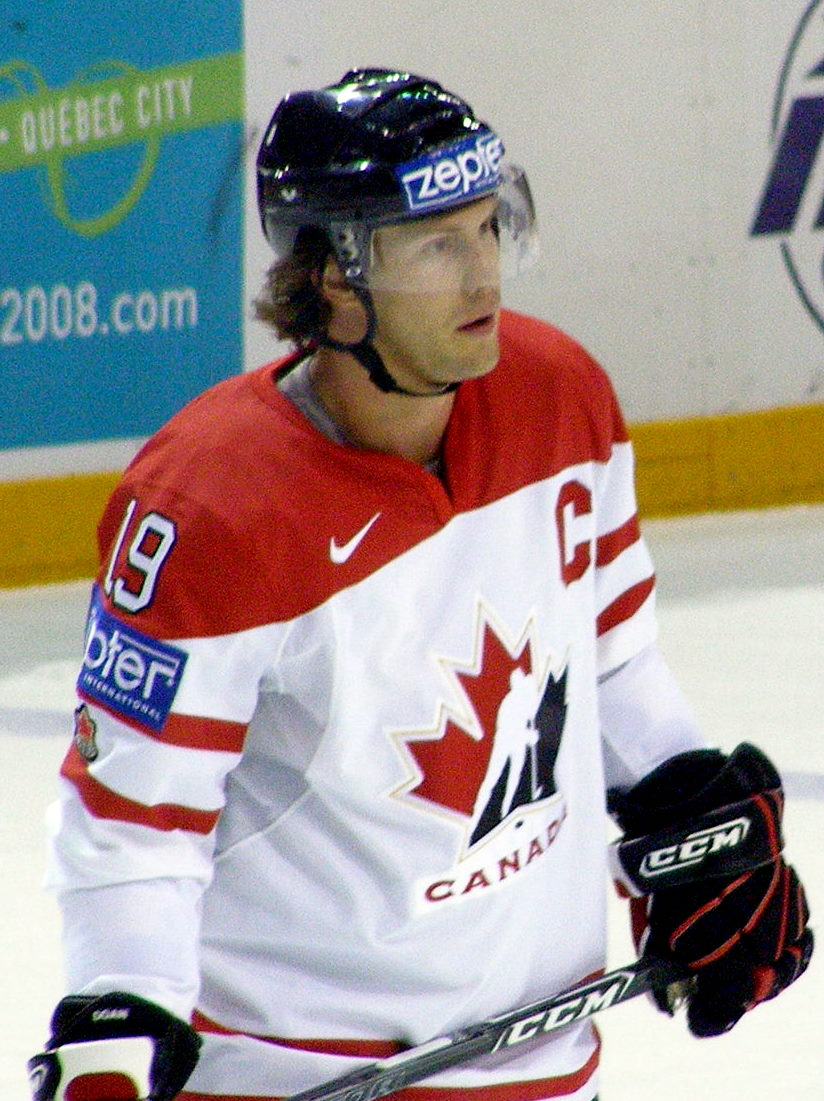
The Jets selected Shane Doan 7th overall in the 1995 NHL entry draft.

== See also ==
- List of Winnipeg Jets (WHA) players
- List of Winnipeg Jets (1979–1996) players
- 1979 NHL Expansion Draft
- List of Arizona Coyotes draft picks
