= Randy Cunneyworth =

Canadian ice hockey coach

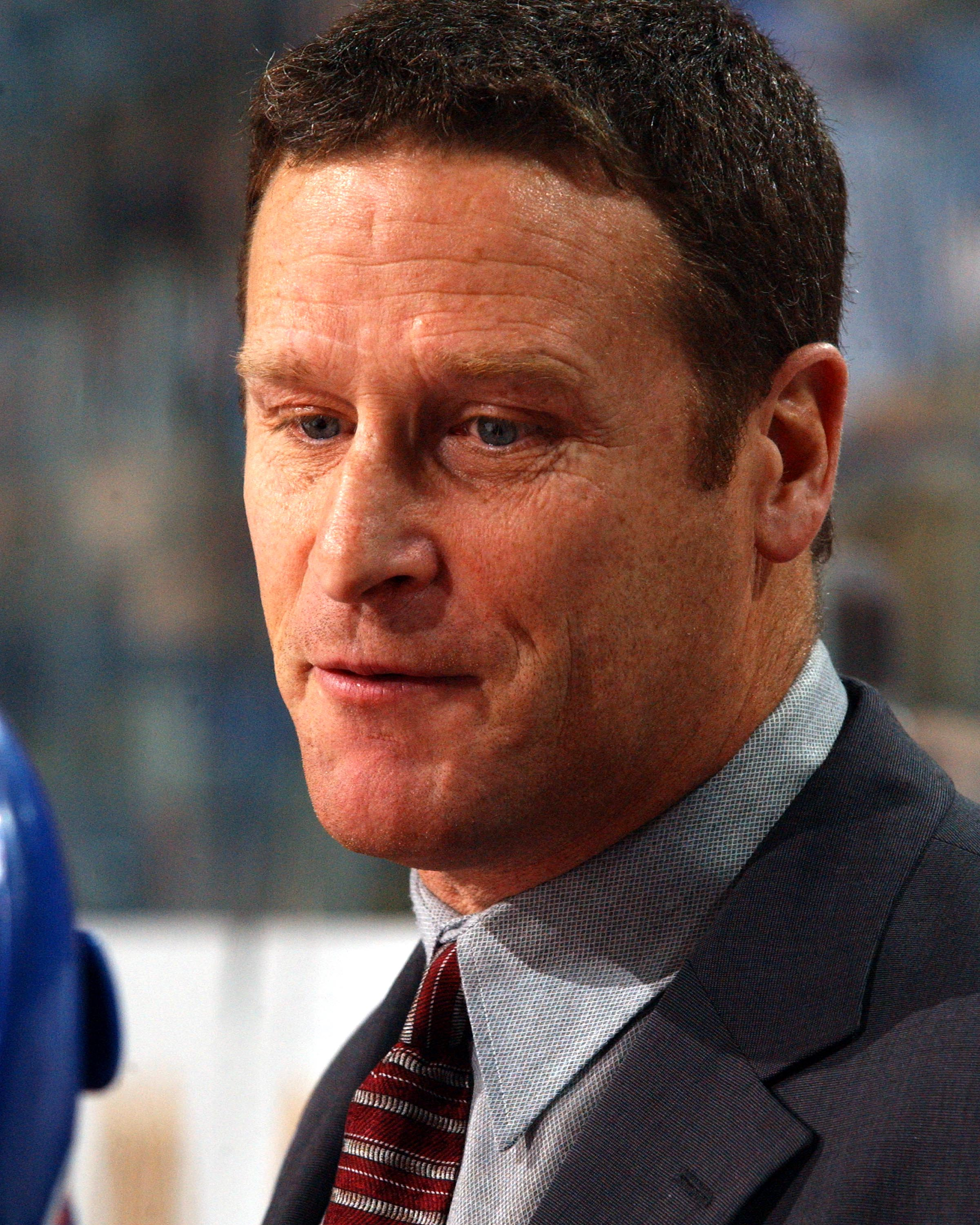
- Cunneyworth in 2004
- Born: May 10, 1961 (age 65) Etobicoke, Ontario, Canada
- Height: 6 ft 0 in (183 cm)
- Weight: 185 lb (84 kg; 13 st 3 lb)
- Position: Left wing
- Shot: Left
- Played for: Buffalo Sabres; Pittsburgh Penguins; Winnipeg Jets; Hartford Whalers; Chicago Blackhawks; Ottawa Senators
- NHL draft: 167th overall, 1980; Buffalo Sabres
- Playing career: 1981–2000

Randy William Cunneyworth (born May 10, 1961) is a Canadian former professional ice hockey player, former AHL head coach, NHL head coach and assistant coach, as well as a pro scout, and player development coach spanning nearly 40 years.

Cunneyworth recently served as a player development coach with the Buffalo Sabres organization. He played professionally in the National Hockey League (NHL) and American Hockey League (AHL) in a twenty-year career; his coaching résumé includes a brief stint as interim head coach of the NHL's Montreal Canadiens. He had long stints as both a player and coach of the AHL's Rochester Americans. Cunneyworth was born in Etobicoke, Ontario, but grew up in Mississauga, Ontario.

== Playing career ==
As a youth, Cunneyworth played in the 1974 Quebec International Pee-Wee Hockey Tournament with a minor ice hockey team from Mississauga.

=== Mississauga Reps Midgets (1977-78) ===
Cunneyworth played one season of Midget hockey for the Mississauga Reps of the former Metro Toronto Hockey League (GTHL).

=== Dixie Beehives (1978–1979) ===
A 10th-round selection (129th overall) in the 1978 OHL Midget Draft, Cunneyworth suited up for his first year of junior hockey with the Dixie Beehives of the former OPJHL (now OJHL). As a 17-year-old rookie, Cunneyworth scored 17 goals and 14 assists in 41 games.

=== Ottawa 67's (1979–1981) ===
After a strong showing with Dixie, Cunneyworth began his major junior hockey career with the Ottawa 67's of the Ontario Hockey League in the 1979–80 season, where in 63 games, he scored 16 goals and 41 points, helping the club into the playoffs. In 11 playoff games, Cunneyworth recorded an assist. Following the season, Cunneyworth was chosen in the eighth round, 167th overall, by general manager Scotty Bowman of the Buffalo Sabres in the 1980 NHL entry draft.

He returned to the Ottawa 67's for the 1980–81 season and led his team in scoring with 54 goals and 128 points in 67 games, as well as leading with 240 penalty minutes. In the playoffs, Cunneyworth appeared in 15 games, scoring five goals and 13 points.

=== Buffalo Sabres and Rochester Americans (1980–1985) ===
Cunneyworth appeared in one game with the American Hockey League (AHL) affiliate, the Rochester Americans in the 1980–81 season, where he earned an assist. He was called up to the Sabres from Ottawa on March 1, 1981 by Sabres GM Scotty Bowman and played in his first NHL game vs the Boston Bruins in Boston 1980–81, where he was held off the scoresheet. He rejoined the Sabres for the post-season along with other prospects following the end of the OHA playoffs, but did not play in any games.

Cunneyworth suffered a serious eye injury (a Barry Melrose high stick) during a September 1981 preseason game at Toronto, and missed the remainder of the preseason. Cunneyworth began the season with Buffalo. During the 1981–82 season, he appeared in 20 games, scoring two goals and six points. He played primarily on the CPR (Canadian Pacific Railroad) line with young teammates Steve Patrick and Lindy Ruff. This nickname was given to the trio by then-Sabres assistant coach Nick Polano. Cunneyworth earned his first NHL assist on October 7, 1981 against the Washington Capitals. He scored his first NHL goal against the Rangers at Madison Square Garden on 11-11-81 in New York against goalie Steve Weeks. Cunneyworth was reassigned to the Sabres affiliate in Rochester in late November. He spent the rest of the 1981–82 season with the Rochester Americans, playing in 57 games, scoring 12 goals and 27 points. Cunneyworth spent the playoffs with Rochester, scoring four goals in nine games, as the Americans lost to the Binghamton Whalers in the South Division finals.

Cunneyworth spent the entire 1982–83 season with the Mike Keenan-coached Rochester Americans. He appeared in 78 games scoring 23 goals and 56 points. In 16 playoff games, Cunneyworth had four goals and eight points, helping the Americans win the 1983 Calder Cup Championship defeating the Maine Mariners.

Cunneyworth spent another full season in the American Hockey League in the 1983–84 season with Rochester, scoring 18 goals and 35 points in 65 games, and once again helping the Americans reach the playoffs. In 17 post-season games, Cunneyworth scored five goals and 10 points, as Rochester lost to the Maine Mariners in the 1984 Calder Cup finals.

During the 1984-85 Buffalo Sabres preseason, Cunneyworth scored three goals and had an assist in four exhibition games. He was also among the leading scorers in inter-squad scrimmages but failed to secure a roster spot. The 1984–85 season would be Cunneyworth's third full season with the Americans playing in 72 games for Rochester, scoring 30 goals and 68 points to finish third in team scoring. In five playoff games, Cunneyworth had two goals and three points, as the Americans fell to the Baltimore Skipjacks in the first round of the playoffs.

Cunneyworth and teammate Ted Nolan began using local Rochester businessman Steve Bartlett as their representative/agent.

Although offered a contract, Cunneyworth elected not to re-sign with the Sabres organization, although the team held his rights. Cunneyworth was granted permission by Sabres GM Scotty Bowman to attend the Pittsburgh Penguins training camp/preseason roster. On October 4, 1985, following the pre-season tryout, Bowman traded Cunneyworth and Mike Moller to the Pittsburgh Penguins for Pat Hughes.

=== Pittsburgh Penguins (1985–1989) ===
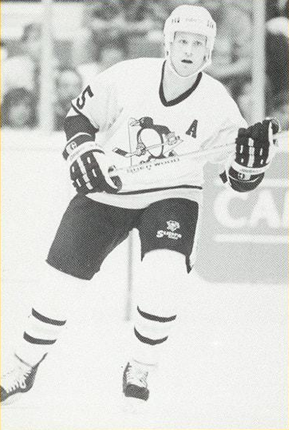
1988 card of Cunneyworth for Pittsburgh Penguins

Cunneyworth returned to the NHL for the 1985–86 as a full-time player with the Pittsburgh Penguins. In 75 games, Cunneyworth scored 15 goals and 45 points to finish sixth in team scoring, as Pittsburgh missed the playoffs by two points, finishing in fifth place in the Patrick Division. He was still classified as an NHL rookie for the season.

In 1986–87, Cunneyworth improved his offensive numbers, scoring 26 goals and 53 points in 79 games to finish third in team scoring behind Mario Lemieux and Dan Quinn, however, the Penguins failed to qualify for the playoffs again, finishing in fifth place, four points out of the postseason. Cunneyworth scored a hat trick in the season opener on October 9, 1986 vs Washington, and had a four-goal game at Quebec on March 3, 1987. He recorded 11 multiple-point games. At season's end, he was the Penguins' nominee for the Masterton Trophy.

The 1987–88 season would be the best offensive season of Cunneyworth's career, as he scored 35 goals and 74 points in 71 games, finishing an impressive third in scoring behind Lemieux and Quinn. However, the Penguins once again failed to qualify for the playoffs, finishing in last place in the Patrick Division despite a 36–35–9 record. Though he was considered, Cunneyworth was not selected by Wales Conference Coach Mike Keenan for the NHL All-Star Game, though his point totals ranked among the league leaders for his position at midseason. Cunneyworth missed 8 regular season games from January 16-30 due to an NHL suspension (5 games for a stick incident vs Boston on December 29, and 3 games for a match penalty during a fight with Steve Konroyd vs the NY Islanders on January 12). He recorded 20 multiple-point games, and scored 14 power-play goals.

In 1988, Cunneyworth joined Paul Coffey as one of the team's alternate captains. Playing primarily on the team's second line, he still managed 25 goals and 44 points in 70 games. He was shifted to right wing late in the season in order to create a solid second line for the upcoming playoff run. In 11 playoff games, Cunneyworth scored three goals and eight points, as Pittsburgh lost to the Philadelphia Flyers in seven games in the Patrick Division final. For the first time, Cunneyworth's name appeared on the NHL all-star ballot for left wingers.

Cunneyworth recorded a career game-high 27 minutes in penalties in a game played February 11, 1989 at Quebec, where he was involved in two on-ice fights versus Marc Fortier and Darrin Kimble during a line brawl. Cunneyworth also left the penalty box during the altercation to aid teammate John Cullen. After throwing a punch at Nordiques rookie Joe Sakic, Cunneyworth engaged Kimble in a fight and was head-butted by Kimble. Cunneyworth missed part of the season when he was hit with a shot by Paul Coffey during a Penguins practice on January 24, 1989.

On June 17, 1989, the Penguins traded Cunneyworth, Rick Tabaracci, and Dave McLlwain to the Winnipeg Jets for Jim Kyte, Andrew McBain, and Randy Gilhen.

=== Winnipeg Jets (1989) ===
Cunneyworth began the 1989–90 season with the Winnipeg Jets, where he played in 28 games for the Jets, scoring five goals and 11 points. Cunneyworth's name appeared on the NHL All-Star ballot for left wingers. He played primarily on a line with Jets captain Dale Hawerchuk and Greg Paslawski.

On December 13, 1989, Winnipeg traded Cunneyworth to the Hartford Whalers for Paul MacDermid.

=== Hartford Whalers (1989–1994) ===
Cunneyworth finished the 1989–90 season with the Hartford Whalers, where in 43 games, he scored nine goals and 18 points, helping the Whalers qualify for the playoffs. In four playoff games, Cunneyworth was held pointless, as the Whalers lost to the Boston Bruins in the Adams Division semi-finals.

Cunneyworth suffered through an injury-plagued 1990–91 season (broken leg/ankle injuries) after being hit by an Ulf Samuelsson shot during Hartford's December 21, 1990 game at Montreal. Appearing in only 32 games for the Whalers, he scored nine goals and 14 points, as the team reached the playoffs once again. Cunneyworth played in only one playoff game, getting no points, as the Whalers were once again eliminated by the Boston Bruins in the first round.

In a preseason game, Cunneyworth recorded a third-period hat trick. Injuries continued to take a toll during the 1991–92 season (ankle injury/back strains), as Cunneyworth played in 39 games with Hartford, scoring seven goals and 17 points, helping the Whalers reach the playoffs for the third consecutive season. In seven playoff games, Cunneyworth had three goals (tied for team lead) as Hartford lost to the Montreal Canadiens in the first round of the postseason.

A healthier Cunneyworth, playing under coach Paul Holmgren in 1992–93, saw spot duty and was often a healthy scratch. In 39 games, he scored five goals and nine points, as Hartford failed to reach the playoffs. He earned 27 minutes in penalties in a game against Pittsburgh on December 4, 1993, in which Cunneyworth instigated a line brawl that featured a fight between Cunneyworth and Markus Näslund.

In 1993–94, playing full-time under new coach Pierre McGuire, Cunneyworth appeared in 63 games with Hartford, scoring nine goals and 17 points. On March 11, 1994, with the Whalers well out of the playoff hunt, Whalers GM Paul Holmgren traded Cunneyworth, Gary Suter, and the Whalers third-round pick in the 1995 NHL entry draft to the Chicago Blackhawks for Frantisek Kucera and Jocelyn Lemieux.

=== Chicago Blackhawks (1994) ===
Cunneyworth finished the 1993–94 season with the Blackhawks, where, in 16 games, he scored four goals and seven points, as the Blackhawks made the playoffs as the sixth seed in the Western Conference. Cunneyworth played in six playoff games with Chicago, getting no points, as the Blackhawks lost to the Toronto Maple Leafs in the first round of the postseason. He played in the last NHL game ever in Chicago Stadium.

After the season, Cunneyworth elected to pursue free agency. On July 15, 1994, he signed a contract with the Ottawa Senators.

=== Ottawa Senators (1994–1998) ===
Due to the 1994–95 NHL lockout, the 1994–95 season was shortened to 48 games. Cunneyworth was named the Senators team captain prior to the start of the season, Cunneyworth appeared in every game during the season. He scored five goals and ten points. The team finished in last place in the NHL. He was the Senators nominee for the King Clancy Award (Leadership and Dedication to the Game)

Cunneyworth had a very solid 1995–96 NHL season with Ottawa, playing in 81 games, scoring 17 goals and 36 points, his highest totals since the 1988–89 season. The Senators once again failed to reach the playoffs, finishing in last place in the league. Cunneyworth had a four-point game February 26, 1996 at St. Louis.

Cunneyworth had another solid season in 1996–97, playing in 76 games for the Senators. He scored 12 goals and 36 points, as he helped the club qualify for the playoffs for the first time in team history, as Ottawa finished in seventh place in the Eastern Conference. He suffered a broken cheekbone during a February 28 game in a fight with Islanders Rich Pilon. In the post-season, Cunneyworth had a goal and two points in seven games, as the Senators lost to the Buffalo Sabres in the first round.

Cunneyworth saw his offensive numbers drop in the 1997–98 season, as he scored two goals and 13 points in 71 games, as Ottawa once again reached the playoffs. In the postseason, Cunneyworth had an assist in six games, as the Senators lost to the Washington Capitals in the Eastern Conference semi-finals.

After four seasons with the Senators, Cunneyworth was given his release by newly hired GM Rick Dudley and became a free agent, and on August 27, 1998, he signed with the Buffalo Sabres.

=== Buffalo Sabres & Rochester Americans (1998–2000) ===
On August 27, 1998, Cunneyworth returned to his first NHL team, the Buffalo Sabres, for the 1998–99 season signing as a free agent. He appeared in 14 games with the Sabres, scoring two goals and four points including the game-winning goal at Vancouver on February 11, 1999. Cunneyworth played in three playoff games for the Sabres, all in the 1999 Stanley Cup Finals, as Buffalo lost to the Dallas Stars. He spent the majority of the season with the Americans, as Cunneyworth suited up for 52 games with the Americans, scoring 10 goals and 28 points while serving as a player/assistant coach. In 20 playoff games, Cunneyworth had three goals and 17 points, as Rochester lost to the Providence Bruins in the 1999 Calder Cup Finals. He played on the Americans' top line with Dominic Pittis and Craig Fisher.

Cunneyworth returned to the Americans for the 1999–2000 season once again as a player/assistant coach. He played in 52 games with Rochester, scoring eight goals and 24 points. Cunneyworth was named captain of Team Canada for the 2000 Kodak AHL All-Star Classic. On February 18, 2000, Cunneyworth suffered a season-ending knee injury in a game against the Quebec Citadelles. He missed the rest of the season and playoffs, where the Americans lost to the Hartford Wolf Pack in the 2000 Calder Cup Finals.

Cunneyworth was the recipient of the AHL's Fred T. Hunt Memorial Award. This award honors the player that best exemplifies the qualities of sportsmanship, determination, and dedication to hockey.

On September 8, 2000, Cunneyworth officially announced his retirement from playing hockey and was named the new head coach of the Rochester Americans by Sabres GM Darcy Regier.

== Coaching career ==
=== Rochester Americans (1999–2008) (first stint) ===
During both years as a player with the Rochester Americans, the Buffalo Sabres' AHL affiliate, Cunneyworth acted as a player-assistant coach during the 1999–2000 AHL season under head coach Brian McCutcheon. After the 1999–2000 season, Cunneyworth retired from being an active player and was named the head coach of the club by Sabres GM Darcy Regier.

In his first season as head coach with the team in 2000–01, Cunneyworth led the club to a 46–22–9–3 record, getting 104 points, and first place in the Mid-Atlantic Division. In the playoffs, the Americans were upset by the Philadelphia Phantoms in four games in the first round.

In the 2001–02, the Americans slumped to a 32–30–15–3 record, earning 82 points and ninth place in the Western Conference. Cunneyworth was fined by the league for throwing a water bottle at referee Chris Rooney due to a disputed goal call vs Syracuse. The Americans qualified for a best-of-three qualifying series with the eighth-seeded Philadelphia Phantoms. The Americans were then swept in two games, missing the post-season.

The Americans had another mediocre season in 2002–03, as the team finished the season with a 31–30–14–5 record, getting 81 points, and tenth place in the Western Conference. The Americans faced the seventh place Milwaukee Admirals for a best-of-three qualifying series, and Milwaukee won the series two games to one to eliminate the Americans from post-season play.

Rochester improved during the 2003–04 season, earning a record of 37–28–10–5, recording 89 points and third place in the North Division. In the playoffs, the Americans defeated the Syracuse Crunch and Hamilton Bulldogs before losing to the Milwaukee Admirals in the Western Conference finals.

In 2004–05, Rochester won the Macgregor Kilpatrick Trophy, as the Americans had the best record in the AHL with a 51–19–6–4 record, earning 112 points. The Americans swept the Hamilton Bulldogs in the first round of the playoffs, however, Rochester was upset by the Manitoba Moose in the second round to end their season. Cunneyworth was awarded with the Louis A.R. Pieri Memorial Award as the AHL's Coach of the Year.

In the 2005–06, the Americans became the AHL affiliate of both the Sabres and Florida Panthers. The team struggled, finishing under .500 for the first time since Cunneyworth became the head coach, as Rochester went 37–39–2–2 for 78 points, fifth in the North Division, missing the playoffs.

The Americans rebounded in the 2006–07 season, earning a record of 48–30–1–1, registering 98 points, and second place in the North Division. In the playoffs, Rochester lost to the Hamilton Bulldogs in the first round.

In 2007–08, the Americans struggled, going only 24–46–6–4, earning 58 points, which was the worst record in the league. On July 24, 2008, Cunneyworth left his position as head coach of the Americans to take an assistant coaching job with the Atlanta Thrashers.

=== Atlanta Thrashers (2008–2010) ===
Cunneyworth joined new Atlanta Thrashers head coach John Anderson as an assistant coach for the 2008–09 season. In his first season with the Thrashers, the team finished with a 35–41–6 record, getting 76 points, well out of a playoff position.

In 2009–10, the Thrashers improved to a 35–34–13 record, earning 83 points, however, the club finished out of the playoffs once again. On April 14, 2010, Atlanta's newly hired general manager Rick Dudley fired Anderson and all of his assistant coaches, including Randy Cunneyworth. After the firing, Dudley was asked if Cunneyworth could possibly return to the team and responded, "I'm not going to commit to (looking at Cunneyworth). Randy was an assistant coach here and he's a guy I have a great deal of affection for. But, I'm not going to get into who is on the list."

=== Hamilton Bulldogs (2010–2011) ===
On July 20, 2010, Pierre Gauthier, the GM of the Montreal Canadiens hired Cunneyworth to be the head coach of their AHL affiliate, the Hamilton Bulldogs. In his first season with the club in 2010–11, Cunneyworth led the Bulldogs to an impressive 44–27–2–7 record, getting 97 points and first place in the North Division. In the post-season, he led the club to series victories over the Oklahoma City Barons and Manitoba Moose before losing to the Houston Aeros in the Western Conference finals.

On July 22, 2011, the Canadiens added Cunneyworth to their NHL assistant coaching staff.

=== Montreal Canadiens (2011–2012) ===
Cunneyworth began the 2011–12 season as an assistant coach to head coach Jacques Martin on the Montreal Canadiens staff. On December 17, 2011, the Canadiens fired Martin and named Cunneyworth the interim head coach. Cunneyworth's promotion caused minor controversy because at the time he only spoke English. The last full-time Canadiens coach who did not speak French at all was Al MacNeil in 1971, and he was dismissed at the conclusion of that season despite coaching the underdog team to the Stanley Cup. As a result of Cunneyworth becoming head coach, several Quebec nationalist groups called for a boycott of Molson. In response, Canadiens owner Geoff Molson promised that Cunneyworth's permanent replacement would be bilingual. Quebec Culture Minister Christine St-Pierre said she expected the Canadiens to rectify the situation as soon as possible. Cunneyworth himself had promised to learn French during the season. In contrast to Quebec nationalists, most regular fans were not bothered by this issue, as "a common refrain heard in Montreal is that fans would be willing to support the hiring of a coach who can't speak French if it were someone like the accomplished Mike Babcock, or local hero Kirk Muller" (indeed, no such controversy occurred when Muller was interim head coach on August 13, 2020). The Canadiens were also criticized for failing to defend their interim head coach against the attacks from Quebec nationalists and politicians, as it "is not Cunneyworth’s fault that he speaks only English. He’s working to change that" and he continued to be professional when this issue came up during press conferences. On January 7, 2012, during a game against the Tampa Bay Lightning, a protest was held outside of the Bell Centre.

Cunneyworth's final game of the 2011–12 season rewarded his efforts with a 4–1 victory over the Toronto Maple Leafs] That game saw forward Tomáš Plekanec score a rare 3-on-5 shorthanded goal; a feat which had not been accomplished in 25 years by a fellow Hab. On May 2, 2012, Cunneyworth was returned to his former position as assistant coach by new Canadiens general manager and former Cunneyworth teammate Marc Bergevin. However, only a month later, on June 6, Cunneyworth was fired by new coach Michel Therrien.

=== Rochester Americans (2015–2016) ===
On July 28, 2015 Buffalo Sabres general manager Tim Murray promoted Cunneyworth from the position of player development coach with the Sabres to the position of Head coach of the Rochester Americans, his second stint as head coach. On February 19, 2016, a 2–1 OT win vs Portland, Cunneyworth passed John Van Boxmeer for first in Amerks history in all-time games coached with game 691. On March 24, 2016, a 6–5 OT win vs St. Johns, Cunneyworth became the Rochester Americans all-time winningest coach passing John Van Boxmeer with win number 338. The 2015–16 Americans failed to reach the postseason.

In a staff reorganization, Cunneyworth returned to his previous position in the Sabres' player development program after Dan Lambert was hired as head coach of the Americans on May 16, 2016.

== Buffalo Sabres - scout/player development (2013–2017) ==
On November 2, 2013, Sabres general manager Darcy Regier hired Cunneyworth as a professional scout for the Sabres. His position would also include special assignments as prescribed by the Sabres' front office. He was heavily rumored to be a possible replacement for then-struggling rookie Sabres head coach Ron Rolston.

On January 8, 2014, Cunneyworth was promoted to special assistant and player development coach/administrator of the Rochester Americans by the newly-hired Sabres president of hockey operations Pat Lafontaine. Cunneyworth would also work directly with Sabres interim head coach Ted Nolan in ensuring operational continuity between the Sabres and the Americans. This would include coaching systems and strategies. According to Lafontaine, "This is an exciting opportunity to fully utilize all of Randy’s expertise as a hockey coach and mentor, Randy will work to ensure that the link between the Sabres and Amerks grows even stronger."

In the summer of 2014, Cunneyworth was a candidate for the position of head coach with the Ottawa 67's. On August 21, 2014, Cunneyworth was promoted to the position of Sabres player development coach by new general manager Tim Murray, overseeing player development in Buffalo and Rochester, and other Sabres prospects.

In the summer of 2015, Cunneyworth was considered as a candidate for the vacant head coaching positions with both the Sabres, which went to Dan Bylsma, and the Americans. On July 28, 2015, Cunneyworth was promoted to the position of head coach of the Americans and formally introduced to the media on July 29, 2015.

In the spring of 2016, Cunneyworth returned to the Sabres' coaching staff within the Department of Player Development. On June 27, 2017, Cunneyworth was fired along with other long-term staff members by newly-hired Sabres general manager Jason Botterill.

== Miscellaneous ==
Cunneyworth spent 19 out of his 36 years in professional hockey with the Buffalo Sabres organization. He currently holds fifth place in AHL all-time games coached with 796, and holds sixth place in all-time wins with 384. He played 1,231 professional games at the NHL and AHL levels (regular and postseason games).

As a player, Cunneyworth was known to be very physical, quick, and possessed the ability to provide reliable secondary scoring as well as handle defensive assignments. A good powerplay performer, he was often called upon to play up on his team's top line. He often took on leadership roles, and was considered a genuine and selfless team player.

In 2010, Cunneyworth was inducted into the Rochester Americans Hall of Fame. Cunneyworth received his plaque and was inducted by Amerks owner and CEO Curt Styres, VP of hockey operations Ted Nolan, and Amerks Hall of Famer and director of hockey operations Jody Gage.

Cunneyworth was inducted into Rochester, New York's Sports Walk of Fame at Frontier Park in 2013.

== Career statistics ==
			Regular season					Playoffs
Season	Team	League	GP	G	A	Pts	PIM	GP	G	A	Pts	PIM
1977–78	Mississauga Reps AAA	MTHL	38	23	24	47	55	—	—	—	—	—
1978–79	Dixie Beehives	OPJHL	44	17	14	31	127	—	—	—	—	—
1979–80	Ottawa 67's	OMJHL	63	16	25	41	145	11	0	1	1	13
1980–81	Ottawa 67's	OHL	67	54	74	128	240	15	5	8	13	35
1980–81	Rochester Americans	AHL	1	0	1	1	2	—	—	—	—	—
1980–81	Buffalo Sabres	NHL	1	0	0	0	2	—	—	—	—	—
1981–82	Rochester Americans	AHL	57	12	15	27	86	9	4	0	4	30
1981–82	Buffalo Sabres	NHL	20	2	4	6	47	—	—	—	—	—
1982–83	Rochester Americans	AHL	78	23	33	56	111	16	4	4	8	35
1983–84	Rochester Americans	AHL	65	18	17	35	85	17	5	5	10	55
1984–85	Rochester Americans	AHL	72	30	38	68	148	5	2	1	3	16
1985–86	Pittsburgh Penguins	NHL	75	15	30	45	74	—	—	—	—	—
1986–87	Pittsburgh Penguins	NHL	79	26	27	53	142	—	—	—	—	—
1987–88	Pittsburgh Penguins	NHL	71	35	39	74	141	—	—	—	—	—
1988–89	Pittsburgh Penguins	NHL	70	25	19	44	156	11	3	5	8	26
1989–90	Winnipeg Jets	NHL	28	5	6	11	34	—	—	—	—	—
1989–90	Hartford Whalers	NHL	43	9	9	18	41	4	0	0	0	2
1990–91	Springfield Indians	AHL	2	0	0	0	5	—	—	—	—	—
1990–91	Hartford Whalers	NHL	32	9	5	14	49	1	0	0	0	0
1991–92	Hartford Whalers	NHL	39	7	10	17	71	7	3	0	3	9
1992–93	Hartford Whalers	NHL	39	5	4	9	63	—	—	—	—	—
1993–94	Hartford Whalers	NHL	63	9	8	17	87	—	—	—	—	—
1993–94	Chicago Blackhawks	NHL	16	4	3	7	13	6	0	0	0	8
1994–95	Ottawa Senators	NHL	48	5	5	10	68	—	—	—	—	—
1995–96	Ottawa Senators	NHL	81	17	19	36	130	—	—	—	—	—
1996–97	Ottawa Senators	NHL	76	12	24	36	99	7	1	1	2	10
1997–98	Ottawa Senators	NHL	71	2	11	13	63	6	0	1	1	6
1998–99	Rochester Americans	AHL	52	10	18	28	55	20	3	14	17	58
1998–99	Buffalo Sabres	NHL	14	2	2	4	0	3	0	0	0	0
1999–2000	Rochester Americans	AHL	52	8	16	24	81	—	—	—	—	—
NHL totals			866	189	225	414	1,280	45	7	7	14	61

== NHL coaching record ==
Team	Year	Regular season						Postseason
Team	Year	G	W	L	OTL	Pts	Finish	Result
MTL	2011–12	50	18	23	9	(78)	5th in Northeast	Missed Playoffs

Preceded by Gord Dineen	Ottawa Senators captain 1995–98	Succeeded by Alexei Yashin
Preceded by Jacques Martin	Interim Head coach of the Montreal Canadiens; 2011–12	Succeeded by Michel Therrien
