= 1999 Eastern League season =

The 1999 Eastern League season began on approximately April 1 and the regular season ended on approximately September 1.

The Harrisburg Senators defeated the Norwich Navigators 3 games to 2 to win the Eastern League Championship Series.

== Regular season ==
=== Standings ===
Eastern League - Northern Division
Team	Win	Loss	%	GB
Trenton Thunder	92	50	.648	–
**Norwich Navigators**	78	64	.549	14.0
Portland Sea Dogs	65	77	.458	27.0
New Britain Rock Cats	65	77	.458	27.0
New Haven Ravens	59	82	.418	32.5
Binghamton Mets	54	88	.380	38.0

Eastern League - Southern Division
Team	Win	Loss	%	GB
Erie SeaWolves	81	61	.570	–
**Harrisburg Senators**	76	66	.535	5.0
Reading Phillies	73	69	.514	8.0
Bowie Baysox	70	71	.496	10.5
Akron Aeros	69	71	.493	11.0
Altoona Curve	67	73	.479	13.0

Notes:

Green shade indicates that team advanced to the playoffs.
Bold indicates that team advanced to ELCS.
Italics indicates that team won ELCS.

=== Statistical league leaders ===
==== Batting leaders ====
Stat	Player	Total
AVG	Nick Johnson (Norwich Navigators)	.345
HR	Chris Norton (Portland Sea Dogs)	38
RBI	Andy Tracy (Harrisburg Senators)	128
R	Nick Johnson (Norwich Navigators)	114

==== Pitching leaders ====
Stat	Player	Total
W	Bronson Arroyo (Altoona Curve); Jason Beverlin (Norwich Navigators)	15; 15
ERA	Pat Ahearne (New Haven Ravens)	2.61
SO	Ryan Anderson (New Haven Ravens)	162
SV	Joe Lisio (Norwich Navigators)	33

== Playoffs ==
=== Divisional Series ===
==== Northern Division ====
The Norwich Navigators defeated the Trenton Thunder in the Northern Division playoffs 3 games to 2.

==== Southern Division ====
The Harrisburg Senators defeated the Erie SeaWolves in the Southern Division playoffs 3 games to 1.

=== Championship Series ===
The Harrisburg Senators defeated the Norwich Navigators in the ELCS 3 games to 2. In the final game of the series, the Navigators were leading 11-9 in the bottom of the ninth. The bases were loaded, there was 2 outs and a full count. That's when Milton Bradley hit a grand slam to win the game, and league championship, for the Senators.
