= Ron Andruff =

Canadian hockey player (born 1953)

- Born: July 10, 1953 (age 72) Port Alberni, British Columbia, Canada
- Height: 6 ft 0 in (183 cm)
- Weight: 185 lb (84 kg; 13 st 3 lb)
- Position: Centre
- Shot: Right
- Played for: Montreal Canadiens; Colorado Rockies
- NHL draft: 32nd overall, 1973; Montreal Canadiens
- WHA draft: 11th overall, 1973; Winnipeg Jets
- Playing career: 1973–1982

Ronald Nicholas Andruff (born July 10, 1953) is a Canadian former professional ice hockey player.

== Career ==
Andruff was selected as the first draft pick of the Winnipeg Jets, of the breakaway World Hockey Association, as well as 32nd pick overall (second round) of the 1973 NHL Amateur Draft. Andruff chose to join the Stanley Cup Champion, Montreal Canadiens. During his nine years as a pro, he had the distinction of winning the Bronze Medal with Team Canada in the Moscow Isvestia Tournament; shared in a Stanley Cup; won the American League Championship – the AL Scoring Title and the Les Cunningham Award for the league’s Most Valuable Player (as chosen by the media and players). He played his last two seasons in Germany with Mannheim Eis- und Rollsport Club (MERC) winning the Deutsche Meisterschaft (German National Hockey League Championship) along with the Lieblingsspieler (MVP award as selected by the fans).

While a pro athlete, Andruff lent his name and support to causes which led to his nomination for the NHL’s Bill Masterton Trophy for his service as Honorary Chairman to the Big Brothers Association, Colorado Chapter. The Masterton Trophy honors the NHL player who best exemplifies the qualities of perseverance, sportsmanship and dedication on and off the ice. He has served on the Board of the Waterbor Burn & Cancer Foundation (New York) and as a Trustee for Just a Drop water charity (London), and currently is an advocate for Peace and Sport (Monaco).

In 1982, Andruff left the pro playing field but continued to work in sports, assuming the position of European Marketing Director for World Championship Tennis. He went on to establish his own sports marketing company in 1984, which acquired the International Basketball Federation (FIBA) FIBA.basketball Cups and Championship rights for a five-year period. In 1988, seeing larger possibilities outside the traditional world of sports marketing, Andruff founded Dynadx Technologies, Inc., a rotational poster advertising display system. This technology, while commonplace today, shifted the sports signage paradigm from location to time. By converting the concept of ‘purchasing single, disparate sign locations’ into purchasing ‘exclusive signage exposure around the entire playing field for specific periods of time’ – Dynadx brought a new dynamic to brand exposure and sports sponsorship. Today, these rotational advertising systems can be seen courtside at most NBA games, behind home plate at Major League Baseball parks across the United States and at countless soccer matches around the world.

A former delegate to the United Nations Association for World Education non-governmental organization (AWE), Andruff has participated in numerous foreign affairs briefings and research projects over the years in an effort to learn how to develop broader educational platforms. Expanding this work, on behalf of the Foreign Policy Association, Andruff researched emerging electronic media and new technologies, authoring a White Paper on the Internet in 1994.

Andruff co-founded fare 1, Inc., the first business-to-trade web-based company (1998) that enabled travel agents to provide their clients with the lowest available fares. After taking fare 1 public on the London A.I.M. Exchange in 2000, he founded Tralliance Corporation, the .travel Registry, an Internet domain space established exclusively for the travel and tourism sector (2001–07). In 2006, Andruff was recognized as one of the "Top 25 Most Extraordinary Minds in Sales & Marketing" by Hospitality Sales & Marketing Association International (HSMAI), which pays special tribute to outstanding individuals who define innovation, creativity and accomplishment.

Currently, he is CEO of dotSport LLC.

== Awards ==
- 1975-76: Les Cunningham Award (AHL)

== Career statistics ==
			Regular season					Playoffs
Season	Team	League	GP	G	A	Pts	PIM	GP	G	A	Pts	PIM
1971–72	Flin Flon Bombers	WCHL	63	20	32	52	44	7	0	3	3	17
1972–73	Flin Flon Bombers	WCHL	66	43	48	91	114	8	2	4	6	15
1973–74	Nova Scotia Voyageurs	AHL	72	11	27	38	93	6	4	0	4	0
1974–75	Montreal Canadiens	NHL	5	0	0	0	2	—	—	—	—	—
1974–75	Nova Scotia Voyageurs	AHL	65	30	31	61	50	6	4	1	5	18
1975–76	Montreal Canadiens	NHL	1	0	0	0	0	—	—	—	—	—
1975–76	Nova Scotia Voyageurs	AHL	74	42	46	88	58	9	5	8	13	9
1976–77	Colorado Rockies	NHL	66	4	18	22	21	—	—	—	—	—
1977–78	Colorado Rockies	NHL	78	15	18	33	31	2	0	0	0	0
1978–79	Colorado Rockies	NHL	3	0	0	0	0	—	—	—	—	—
1978–79	Philadelphia Firebirds	AHL	35	16	16	32	8	—	—	—	—	—
1978–79	New Haven Nighthawks	AHL	33	9	23	32	10	10	6	11	17	0
1979–80	Mannheimer ERC	1.GBun	47	44	40	84	117	—	—	—	—	—
1980–81	Mannheimer ERC	1.GBun	44	35	43	78	110	10	8	7	15	16
1981–82	Düsseldorfer EG	1.GBun	4	1	3	4	6	—	—	—	—	—
AHL totals			279	108	143	251	219	31	19	20	39	27
NHL totals			153	19	36	55	54	2	0	0	0	0
1.GBun totals			95	80	86	166	233	10	8	7	15	16

== See also ==
- List of NHL seasons
- List of NHL players
- List of AHL seasons

Preceded by None	Winnipeg Jets first-round draft pick 1973	Succeeded by Randy Andreachuk
