= Randy Andreachuk =

Canadian ice hockey player

- Born: July 19, 1954 (age 71) Lethbridge, Alberta, Canada
- Height: 6 ft 0 in (183 cm)
- Weight: 177 lb (80 kg; 12 st 9 lb)
- Position: Centre
- Shot: Right
- Played for: Winnipeg Jets
- NHL draft: 71st overall, 1974; Philadelphia Flyers
- WHA draft: 7th overall, 1974; Winnipeg Jets
- Playing career: 1974–1978

Randy Andreachuk (born July 19, 1954) is a Canadian former professional ice hockey player. He played in two World Hockey Association games with the Winnipeg Jets during the 1974–75 season. His National Hockey League rights were traded in 1974 by the Philadelphia Flyers to the St. Louis Blues, along with a draft pick, in exchange for Wayne Stephenson.

== Career statistics ==
=== Regular season and playoffs ===
			Regular season					Playoffs
Season	Team	League	GP	G	A	Pts	PIM	GP	G	A	Pts	PIM
1970–71	Lethbridge Sugar Kings	AJHL	—	—	—	—	—	—	—	—	—	—
1971–72	Lethbridge Sugar Kings	AJHL	37	20	27	47	80	—	—	—	—	—
1971–72	Medicine Hat Tigers	WCHL	14	4	2	6	5	—	—	—	—	—
1972–73	Calgary Centennials	WCHL	17	2	1	3	0	—	—	—	—	—
1972–73	Vancouver Nats	WCHL	46	16	26	42	22	—	—	—	—	—
1973–74	Kamloops Chiefs	WCHL	68	49	48	97	61	—	—	—	—	—
1974–75	Winnipeg Jets	WHA	2	0	0	0	0	—	—	—	—	—
1974–75	Roanoke Valley Rebels	SHL	50	23	25	48	8	4	0	1	1	0
1975–76	Roanoke Valley Rebels	SHL	65	30	28	58	14	6	1	1	2	12
1976–77	Winston-Salem Polar Twins	SHL	22	11	7	18	2	—	—	—	—	—
1977–78	San Diego Mariners	PHL	5	0	2	2	0	—	—	—	—	—
WHA totals			2	0	0	0	0	—	—	—	—	—

Preceded by Ron Andruff	Winnipeg Jets first-round draft pick 1974	Succeeded by Brad Gassoff
