= Jim Kyte =

Canadian ice hockey player (born 1964)

Jim Kyte CM
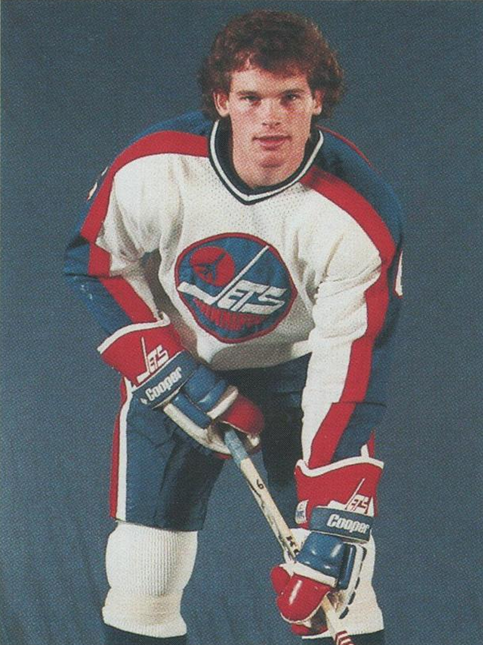
- Kyte in 1984 photo
- Born: March 21, 1964 (age 62) Ottawa, Ontario, Canada
- Height: 6 ft 5 in (196 cm)
- Weight: 220 lb (100 kg; 15 st 10 lb)
- Position: Defence
- Shot: Left
- Played for: Winnipeg Jets; Pittsburgh Penguins; Calgary Flames; Ottawa Senators; San Jose Sharks
- NHL draft: 12th overall, 1982; Winnipeg Jets
- Playing career: 1983–1997

James Gregory Kyte CM (born March 21, 1964) is a Canadian former professional ice hockey player. Kyte made history by being the first (and to date, only) legally deaf National Hockey League (NHL) player, playing 598 games in the NHL.

Kyte is the son of Canadian former university athletic star John Kyte, St. Francis Xavier University's Athlete-of-the-Half-Century. He is also the brother of Canadian former track team member Aynslee Kyte.

== Junior hockey ==
=== Cornwall Royals (1981–1983) ===
Kyte's first junior season was with the Cornwall Royals of the Ontario Hockey League in 1981–82, where in 52 games, Kyte had four goals and 17 points, helping the club clinch the final playoff spot in the Leyden Division. In five playoff games, Kyte was held pointless.

== Professional career ==
=== Winnipeg Jets (1982–1989) ===
Kyte was drafted by the Winnipeg Jets in the first round, 12th overall, in the 1982 NHL entry draft. He made his NHL debut late in the 1982–83 season, going pointless while appearing in two games with Winnipeg.

Kyte saw limited ice time with the Jets as a rookie in 1983–84, appearing in 58 games and scoring one goal and two assists, helping the team reach the playoffs. In three playoff games that season, Kyte did not earn a point as Winnipeg was swept by the Edmonton Oilers in the Smythe Division semi-finals.

In 1984–85, Kyte appeared in 71 games with the Jets, earning three assists, while accumulating 111 penalty minutes. In eight playoff games, Kyte was held off the scoresheet, as the team defeated the Calgary Flames in the Smythe Division semi-finals, however, the Jets were then swept by the Edmonton Oilers in the Division finals.

Kyte again appeared in 71 games with the Jets in 1985–86, scoring a goal and four points, while getting 126 penalty minutes, as Winnipeg qualified for the post-season. In three games, Kyte had no points, as the Jets lost to the Calgary Flames in the Smythe Division semi-finals.

Kyte's offensive production increased in 1986–87, as he managed to score five goals and 10 points in 72 games, while getting 162 penalty minutes. In 10 playoff games, Kyte earned four assists, as the Jets would end up losing to the Edmonton Oilers in the Smythe Division finals.

Injuries plagued Kyte during the 1987–88 season, as he played in only 51 games, scoring a goal and four points while accumulating 128 penalty minutes. The Jets qualified for the post-season, however, Kyte did not appear in any games.

Kyte appeared in a career high 74 games with the Jets in 1988–89, scoring three goals and 12 points, as well as getting 190 penalty minutes. Winnipeg failed to make the playoffs.

On June 17, 1989, Kyte, Andrew McBain and Randy Gilhen were traded by the Jets to the Pittsburgh Penguins for Randy Cunneyworth, Rick Tabaracci and Dave McLlwain.

=== Pittsburgh Penguins (1989–1990) ===
Kyte joined the Pittsburgh Penguins in the 1989–90, where in 56 games, he scored three goals and four points, as well as getting 125 penalty minutes. The Penguins failed to make the playoffs.

The Penguins sent Kyte to begin the 1990–91 season with the Muskegon Lumberjacks of the International Hockey League (IHL). In 25 games, Kyte scored two goals and seven points, as well as recording 157 penalty minutes. Kyte also appeared in one game with the Penguins, getting no points and two penalty minutes.

On December 13, 1990, the Penguins traded Kyte to the Calgary Flames for Jiří Hrdina.

=== Calgary Flames (1990–1992) ===
Kyte finished the 1990–91 with the Calgary Flames, where in 42 games, he earned nine assists and 153 penalty minutes, helping the team reach the playoffs. In seven playoff games, Kyte had no points and seven penalty minutes, as the Flames lost to the Edmonton Oilers in the Smythe Division semi-finals.

Kyte appeared in 21 games with Calgary in 1991–92, getting one assist and 107 penalty minutes. He also played in six games with the Salt Lake Golden Eagles of the IHL, earning an assist and nine penalty minutes. After the season, Kyte became a free agent.

=== Ottawa Senators (1992–1993) ===
Kyte signed with the Ottawa Senators on September 10, 1992. He spent a majority of the 1992–93 season with the New Haven Senators of the American Hockey League (AHL), scoring six goals and 24 points in 63 games. In four games with Ottawa, Kyte earned an assist. Kyte was granted free agency after only one season with the Senators.

=== Las Vegas Thunder (1993–1995) ===
Kyte signed with the Las Vegas Thunder of the IHL for the 1993–94 season. In 75 games, Kyte scored two goals and 18 points, and accumulated 246 penalty minutes. In four playoff games, Kyte had an assist, and 51 penalty minutes.

He played a second season with the Thunder in 1994–95, scoring three goals and 20 points in 76 games with the team. Kyte left the Thunder late in the season, as he signed with the San Jose Sharks.

=== San Jose Sharks (1994–1996) ===
Kyte signed as a free agent with the San Jose Sharks on March 31, 1995. He finished the 1994–95 season with the Sharks, scoring two goals and seven points in 18 games, helping the team reach the post-season. In 11 playoff games, Kyte had two assists, as the Sharks upset the favoured Calgary Flames in the Western Conference quarter-finals, before losing to the Detroit Red Wings in the second round of the playoffs.

Kyte played in 57 games with San Jose in 1995–96, scoring a goal and eight points, and earning 146 penalty minutes, however, the team failed to make the playoffs. Kyte was granted free agency after the season.

=== Kansas City Blades (1996–1997) ===
Kyte finished his playing career in 1996–97 with the Kansas City Blades of the IHL. In 76 games, Kyte had three goals and 11 points, as well as recording 259 penalty minutes. In three playoff games, Kyte had no points. Kyte's playing career came to an end from a concussion suffered in an automobile accident in 1997 and he was forced into retirement.

=== Post-hockey career ===
After retiring from hockey, Kyte wrote a hockey column, Point Man, for four years in the Ottawa Citizen and joined Algonquin College in 2002. After creating the very successful Sport Business Management postgraduate program at Algonquin College in 2002, Kyte became the Academic Chair of the Marketing & Management Studies Department in the Algonquin College School of Business in 2007. He earned a master's degree in business administration from Royal Roads University in 2012. In 2014, he was selected to be the Dean of Algonquin College's School of Hospitality and Tourism.

== Career statistics ==
			Regular season					Playoffs
Season	Team	League	GP	G	A	Pts	PIM	GP	G	A	Pts	PIM
1980–81	Hawkesbury Hawks	CJHL	42	2	24	26	133	—	—	—	—	—
1981–82	Cornwall Royals	OHL	52	4	13	17	148	5	0	0	0	10
1982–83	Winnipeg Jets	NHL	2	0	0	0	0	—	—	—	—	—
1982–83	Cornwall Royals	OHL	65	6	30	36	195	8	0	2	2	24
1983–84	Winnipeg Jets	NHL	58	1	2	3	55	3	0	0	0	11
1984–85	Winnipeg Jets	NHL	71	0	3	3	111	8	0	0	0	14
1985–86	Winnipeg Jets	NHL	71	1	3	4	126	3	0	0	0	12
1986–87	Winnipeg Jets	NHL	72	5	5	10	162	10	0	4	4	36
1987–88	Winnipeg Jets	NHL	51	1	3	4	128	—	—	—	—	—
1988–89	Winnipeg Jets	NHL	74	3	9	12	190	—	—	—	—	—
1989–90	Pittsburgh Penguins	NHL	56	3	1	4	125	—	—	—	—	—
1990–91	Pittsburgh Penguins	NHL	1	0	0	0	2	—	—	—	—	—
1990–91	Muskegon Lumberjacks	IHL	25	2	5	7	157	—	—	—	—	—
1990–91	Calgary Flames	NHL	42	0	9	9	153	7	0	0	0	7
1991–92	Calgary Flames	NHL	21	0	1	1	107	—	—	—	—	—
1991–92	Salt Lake Golden Eagles	IHL	6	0	1	1	9	—	—	—	—	—
1992–93	New Haven Senators	AHL	63	6	18	24	163	—	—	—	—	—
1992–93	Ottawa Senators	NHL	4	0	1	1	4	—	—	—	—	—
1993–94	Las Vegas Thunder	IHL	75	2	16	18	246	4	0	1	1	51
1994–95	Las Vegas Thunder	IHL	76	3	17	20	195	—	—	—	—	—
1994–95	San Jose Sharks	NHL	18	2	5	7	33	11	0	2	2	14
1995–96	San Jose Sharks	NHL	57	1	7	8	146	—	—	—	—	—
1996–97	Kansas City Blades	IHL	76	3	8	11	259	3	0	0	0	2
NHL totals			598	17	49	66	1342	42	0	6	6	94
IHL totals			258	10	47	57	866	7	0	1	1	53

== Awards and honors ==
In 2018, Kyte was inducted into the Canadian Disability Hall of Fame.

In 2024, Kyte was inducted into the Order of Canada as a Member by Governor General Mary Simon for being the first deaf player in the history of the National Hockey League.

Preceded by Dale Hawerchuk	Winnipeg Jets first-round draft pick 1982	Succeeded by Andrew McBain
