= Steven Gluckstern =

American entrepreneur (1951–2022)

Steven Gluckstern (May 1, 1951 – May 29, 2022) was an American entrepreneur. He was the first chairman of the Democracy Alliance. He was previously the owner of the original Winnipeg Jets and Phoenix Coyotes NHL franchises; he sold this stake in the team in 1997, a year after moving the team to Phoenix, to lead a group that would buy the New York Islanders. Following a difficult tenure, the group sold the team to Charles Wang in 2000.

Sporting positions
Preceded by John Spano	New York Islanders owner 1997–2000; Served alongside: Howard Milstein	Succeeded by Charles Wang; Sanjay Kumar
Preceded by Barry Shenkarow as Winnipeg Jets	Phoenix Coyotes owner 1996–1998	Succeeded by Richard Burke
