= Brad Gassoff =

Canadian ice hockey player (born 1955)

- Born: November 13, 1955 (age 70) Quesnel, British Columbia, Canada
- Height: 5 ft 11 in (180 cm)
- Weight: 195 lb (88 kg; 13 st 13 lb)
- Position: Left wing
- Shot: Left
- Played for: Vancouver Canucks
- NHL draft: 28th overall, 1975; Vancouver Canucks
- WHA draft: 8th overall, 1975; Winnipeg Jets
- Playing career: 1975–1980

Howard Bradley "Gasser" Gassoff (born November 13, 1955, in Quesnel, British Columbia), is a Canadian former professional ice hockey player. A left winger, Gasoff played for the Vancouver Canucks of the National Hockey League (NHL).

He was drafted by the Canucks in the second round, 28th overall in the 1975 NHL Amateur Draft, and was selected by the Winnipeg Jets in the first round, eighth overall 1975 1975 WHA Amateur Draft. Gassoff spent most of his career in the Central Hockey League (CHL) with the Tulsa Oilers and the Dallas Black Hawks. He later retired as a Dallas player.

== Family ==
His brother Bob also played in the NHL for the St. Louis Blues until his death on May 27, 1977, in a motorcycle accident. His brother Ken, born October 9, 1954, was drafted by the New York Rangers in the 1974 NHL amateur draft and by the Houston Aeros in the 1974 WHA Amateur Draft.

== Awards ==
- Ken McKenzie Trophy - 1975–76

== Career statistics ==
=== Regular season and playoffs ===
| | | | Regular season | | | | | Playoffs |
| Season | Team | League | GP | G | A | Pts | PIM | GP | G | A | Pts | PIM |
|---|---|---|---|---|---|---|---|---|---|---|---|---|
| 1971–72 | Drumheller Falcons | AJHL | — | — | — | — | — | — | — | — | — | — |
| 1972–73 | Medicine Hat Tigers | WCHL | 67 | 13 | 22 | 35 | 122 | 17 | 3 | 3 | 6 | 67 |
| 1973–74 | Medicine Hat Tigers | WCHL | 61 | 16 | 25 | 41 | 245 | 6 | 1 | 0 | 1 | 22 |
| 1974–75 | Kamloops Chiefs | WCHL | 69 | 50 | 59 | 109 | 251 | 6 | 4 | 1 | 5 | 24 |
| 1975–76 | Tulsa Oilers | CHL | 68 | 36 | 28 | 64 | 295 | 9 | 5 | 6 | 11 | 32 |
| 1975–76 | Vancouver Canucks | NHL | 4 | 0 | 0 | 0 | 5 | — | — | — | — | — |
| 1976–77 | Tulsa Oilers | CHL | 31 | 12 | 16 | 28 | 58 | — | — | — | — | — |
| 1976–77 | Vancouver Canucks | NHL | 37 | 6 | 4 | 10 | 35 | — | — | — | — | — |
| 1977–78 | Tulsa Oilers | CHL | 18 | 11 | 9 | 20 | 29 | — | — | — | — | — |
| 1977–78 | Vancouver Canucks | NHL | 47 | 9 | 6 | 15 | 70 | — | — | — | — | — |
| 1978–79 | Dallas Black Hawks | CHL | 36 | 11 | 20 | 31 | 164 | — | — | — | — | — |
| 1978–79 | Vancouver Canucks | NHL | 34 | 4 | 7 | 11 | 53 | 3 | 0 | 0 | 0 | 0 |
| 1979–80 | Dallas Black Hawks | CHL | 68 | 14 | 48 | 62 | 353 | — | — | — | — | — |
| CHL totals | | | 221 | 84 | 121 | 205 | 899 | 9 | 5 | 6 | 11 | 32 |
| NHL totals | | | 122 | 19 | 17 | 36 | 163 | 3 | 0 | 0 | 0 | 0 |

| Preceded by Randy Andreachuk | Winnipeg Jets first-round draft pick 1975 | Succeeded by Thomas Gradin |
