= Andrew McBain =

Canadian ice hockey player (born 1965)

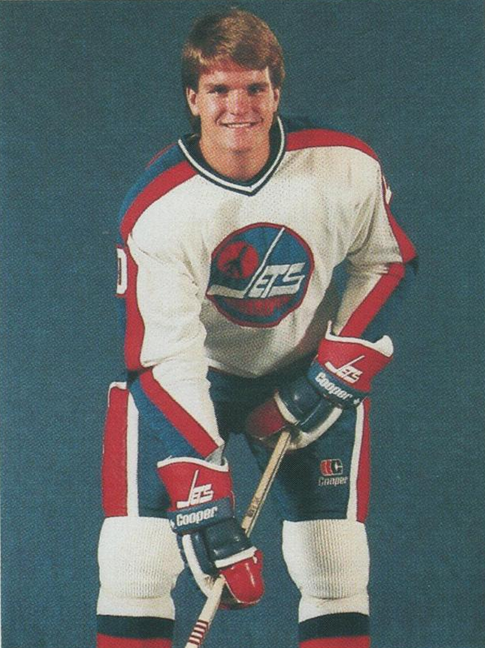
- McBain in 1984 photo
- Born: January 18, 1965 (age 61) Toronto, Ontario, Canada
- Height: 6 ft 3 in (191 cm)
- Weight: 210 lb (95 kg; 15 st 0 lb)
- Position: Right wing
- Shot: Right
- Played for: Winnipeg Jets; Pittsburgh Penguins; Vancouver Canucks; Ottawa Senators
- National team: Canada
- NHL draft: 8th overall, 1983; Winnipeg Jets
- Playing career: 1983–1996

International medals

Men's ice hockey

Representing Canada

World Championship
Silver medal – second place	1989	Ice hockey

Andrew Burton McBain (born January 18, 1965) is a Canadian former professional ice hockey player. McBain played eleven seasons in the National Hockey League between 1983 and 1994.

== Playing career ==
As a youth, McBain played in the 1977 and 1978 Quebec International Pee-Wee Hockey Tournaments with the Toronto Young Nationals minor ice hockey team.

McBain was selected 8th overall in the 1983 NHL entry draft by the Winnipeg Jets after scoring 120 points in junior hockey the previous season for the North Bay Centennials. He stepped straight into the NHL in 1983–84 at the age of just 18, and turned in a promising rookie campaign with 11 goals and 19 assists for 30 points in 78 games.

McBain would struggle to build off his rookie campaign, however, and slumped to just 7 goals and 22 points in 1984–85. After scoring just 3 goals in 28 games to start the 1985–86 campaign, he suffered a serious knee injury which required surgery and ended his season. He returned in 1986–87 to post 11 goals and 32 points for the Jets, but was considered a disappointment to that point in his career.

However, McBain's career would take an upward turn when he was placed on a line with superstar center Dale Hawerchuk for the 1987–88 season and was finally able to show the talent which had made him such a high draft pick, finishing the year with 32 goals and 31 assists for 63 points. He proved especially deadly on the powerplay, where his 20 goals ranked him amongst the league leaders. He would be even better in 1988–89, as he recorded career highs of 37 goals and 40 assists for 77 points, and again scored 20 goals on the powerplay. At the conclusion of the season, he represented Canada at the 1989 World Ice Hockey Championships, and helped the team to a silver medal with 6 goals in 10 games.

Following the season, though, McBain was dealt to the Pittsburgh Penguins in a move which would ultimately derail his career. Expected to be another offensive weapon on a star-studded Penguin team, McBain was beaten out for a scoring-line right wing spot by rookie Mark Recchi and found himself mired on the team's fourth line. He scored only 5 goals and 14 points in 41 games for Pittsburgh before being dealt mid-season to the Vancouver Canucks. He wouldn't fare any better in Vancouver, and finished the season with just 9 goals and 23 points in 67 games.

In 1990–91, McBain was assigned to the minors for the first time in his career, and spent most of the next two seasons in the IHL with the Milwaukee Admirals. He appeared in just 19 games for the Canucks over that stretch, scoring only one goal.

NHL expansion in the early 1990s provided an opportunity for McBain to get his career back on track, and he signed with the Ottawa Senators for their inaugural season in 1992–93. He appeared in 59 games for the Senators, scoring 7 goals and 23 points. He fared better in 1993–94, with 11 goals in 55 games for Ottawa, his highest total since 1989. At the end of the season, however, he was released.

McBain spent two more seasons toiling in the IHL before retiring in 1996. He finished his NHL career with totals of 129 goals and 172 assists for 301 points in 608 games, along with 633 penalty minutes.

== Career statistics ==
=== Regular season and playoffs ===
			Regular season					Playoffs
Season	Team	League	GP	G	A	Pts	PIM	GP	G	A	Pts	PIM
1980–81	Aurora Tigers	OPJHL	43	16	21	37	21	—	—	—	—	—
1981–82	Niagara Falls Flyers	OHL	68	19	25	44	35	5	0	3	3	4
1982–83	North Bay Centennials	OHL	67	33	87	120	61	8	2	6	8	17
1983–84	Winnipeg Jets	NHL	78	11	19	30	37	3	2	0	2	0
1984–85	Winnipeg Jets	NHL	77	7	15	22	45	7	1	0	1	0
1985–86	Winnipeg Jets	NHL	28	3	3	6	17	—	—	—	—	—
1986–87	Winnipeg Jets	NHL	71	11	21	32	106	9	0	2	2	10
1987–88	Winnipeg Jets	NHL	74	32	31	63	145	5	2	5	7	29
1988–89	Winnipeg Jets	NHL	80	37	40	77	71	—	—	—	—	—
1989–90	Pittsburgh Penguins	NHL	41	5	9	14	51	—	—	—	—	—
1989–90	Vancouver Canucks	NHL	26	4	5	9	22	—	—	—	—	—
1990–91	Vancouver Canucks	NHL	13	0	5	5	32	—	—	—	—	—
1990–91	Milwaukee Admirals	IHL	47	27	24	51	69	6	2	5	7	12
1991–92	Milwaukee Admirals	IHL	65	24	54	78	132	5	1	2	3	10
1991–92	Vancouver Canucks	NHL	6	1	0	1	0	—	—	—	—	—
1992–93	New Haven Senators	AHL	1	0	1	1	4	—	—	—	—	—
1992–93	Ottawa Senators	NHL	59	7	16	23	43	—	—	—	—	—
1993–94	Ottawa Senators	NHL	55	11	8	19	64	—	—	—	—	—
1993–94	Prince Edward Island Senators	AHL	26	6	10	16	102	—	—	—	—	—
1994–95	Las Vegas Thunder	IHL	62	15	27	42	111	8	0	3	3	33
1995–96	Fort Wayne Komets	IHL	77	15	15	30	85	5	0	2	2	10
NHL totals			608	129	172	301	633	24	5	7	12	39

=== International statistics ===
Year	Team	Event	GP	G	A	Pts	PIM
1989	Canada	WC	10	6	2	8	8
Senior totals			10	6	2	8	8

== Awards ==
- OHL Second All-Star Team (1983)

Preceded by Jim Kyte	Winnipeg Jets first-round draft pick 1983	Succeeded by Bobby Dollas
