= Chris Norton =

Paralyzed Division III football player

Chris Norton is a former American football defensive back, who played Division III football for the Luther College Norse. His football career ended in 2010 when he became paralyzed while making a tackle during a kick off in a game against Central College. He was given a 3% chance of ever regaining movement below the neck but has continued to recover some sensation and mobility throughout his body—including his hands, legs, feet and torso. Today he lives in Florida with his wife where he manages his non-profit foundation and works full-time as a motivational speaker.

== Injury ==
On October 16, 2010, Norton fractured his C3 and C4 vertebrae in the 3rd quarter of play during a football game against Central College in Decorah, Iowa. The fracture occurred on impact as his head collided with the ball carrier's knee during a kick-off return. As the pile cleared, Norton lay face down, motionless on the ground. He was transported off the field via ambulance and taken for emergency care to Winnishiek Medical Center where doctors stabilized him for an airlift to neighboring Mayo Clinic.

Later that night at Rochester's Mayo Clinic, Norton underwent surgery in which a piece of his hip bone was used to fuse together his C3, C4 and C5 vertebrae. Prior to the surgery doctors gave him a 3% chance of regaining any movement below his neck. The surgery ended after three hours without any serious complications.

=== Recovery ===
The morning of October 16, 2010, Norton awoke with his neck immobilized and a tube placed in his throat to supplement oxygen flow. Although he couldn't initially speak he was able to shrug his left shoulder ever so slightly. He spent the next five days in the ICU before being transferred to rehab for occupational and physical therapy over the next four months.

Five weeks into his rehab he regained some movement and feeling throughout his upper body but still was unable to move anything below his waist. In March 2011 he moved into the Ronald McDonald house of Rochester and continued rehab in Mayo Clinic's outpatient program for the next three months.

On May 20, 2011, Norton moved back home to Bondurant, Iowa and regained enough strength throughout his torso and arms to operate a power assisted wheel chair by the fall of 2011. He returned to Luther College where he lived in campus housing with a group of former teammates. His sister, Alex, a registered nurse, moved close by to help.

On May 24, 2015, he accepted his diploma in Business Management and was able to walk across the stage with assistance from his fiancée, Emily Summers. The video of his walk has reached over 300 million views. On April 21, 2018, Norton married Emily Summers in Jupiter, Florida. Norton sat in his wheelchair while exchanging vows, before being helped up by Emily and slowly walking up the aisle together with Emily's support. Their ceremony was filmed by People magazine, and video of Norton walking with Emily again went viral.

== Foundation ==
In 2012, Norton and his family founded the SCI CAN Foundation, a 501(c)3 nonprofit organization to raise money for individuals with spinal cord injuries in Iowa and the Midwest. It hosts annual fundraising dinners and various functions throughout the year pay for grant to rehab facilities, hospitals and individuals. As of 2017, the SCI CAN Foundation has raised over $600,000.

== Speaking career ==
While still in college, he traveled around northern Iowa to speak with church groups, college clubs and local sports teams, and eventually also to corporations and conferences across the country. Along with his father, Terry, he published a father-son memoir, "The Power of Faith When Tragedy Strikes" in 2015. After college Norton started his own speaking company, Norton Motivation, operating out of Port St. Lucie, Florida.
