= Winnipeg Jets (1972–1996) =

Former team of the National Hockey League and World Hockey Association

- Founded: 1972
- History: Winnipeg Jets; 1972–1979 (WHA); 1979–1996 (NHL); Atlanta Thrashers; 1999–2011; Winnipeg Jets; 2011–present
- Home arena: Winnipeg Arena
- City: Winnipeg, Manitoba
- Team colours: Blue, red, white
- Stanley Cups: 0
- Avco World Trophies: 3 (1975–76, 1977–78, 1978–79)
- Conference championships: 0
- Presidents' Trophies: 0
- Division championships: 3 (1972–73, 1975–76, 1977–78)

The Winnipeg Jets were a professional ice hockey team based in Winnipeg. They began play in the World Hockey Association (WHA) in 1972. The club joined the National Hockey League (NHL) in 1979 after the NHL merged with the WHA. The team played their home games at Winnipeg Arena.

The Jets' WHA years were successful, with the team making the playoffs every year except for the 1974–75 season. The team's success continued in the postseason, with the Jets winning the Avco Cup three times (in 1976, 1978, and 1979) and appeared in the Avco Cup Finals two additional times (in 1973 and 1977). The team struggled early on in the NHL, in part due to the 1979 expansion draft, going a combined 29–106–25 through the 1979–80 and 1980–81 seasons. The Jets made the Stanley Cup playoffs every season from 1981–82 to 1987–88, though the team only finished with a winning record twice during that period, in 1984–85 and 1986–87, which were also the only times the Jets advanced past the first round while in Winnipeg.

During the early 1990s, the Jets started to experience financial difficulties due to a combination of rule changes to free agency, a weakening Canadian dollar, and the team's home arena, the over 40 year old Winnipeg Arena, being seen as antiquated (no luxury suites) with numerous obstructed views. Additionally, Winnipeg became the NHL's smallest market following the relocation of the Quebec Nordiques to Denver, Colorado as the Colorado Avalanche in 1995–96. Following a failed plan to replace the aging Winnipeg Arena in 1996, Jets owner Barry Shenkarow sold the team to Steven Gluckstern and Richard Burke for $65 million, who eventually reached an agreement with Phoenix Suns owner Jerry Colangelo to move the team to Phoenix, Arizona, after a proposed move to Minneapolis–Saint Paul fell through. The Jets played their final home game (and final game overall) before moving on April 28, 1996, a 4–1 loss to the Detroit Red Wings in the Stanley Cup playoffs. All records of the Jets were retained as the relocated franchise competed first as the Phoenix Coyotes, and then renamed itself to the Arizona Coyotes. In April 2024, after years of financial instability, the Coyotes suspended operations. With their assets (including players and hockey operations staff) being transferred to the new Utah Mammoth, the Coyotes entered inactivity with their intellectual property (name, logos, etc.) remaining in Phoenix.

The NHL returned to Winnipeg fifteen years later prior to the 2011–12 season following the relocation of the Atlanta Thrashers, and the relocated team was granted permission to use the Winnipeg Jets name and played its first home game on October 9, 2011, at the MTS Centre. On September 24, 2026, the NHL consolidated the original Jets' franchise records and history with the current Jets franchise.

== History ==
=== The WHA years (1971–1979) ===
==== Recruitment and first game ====
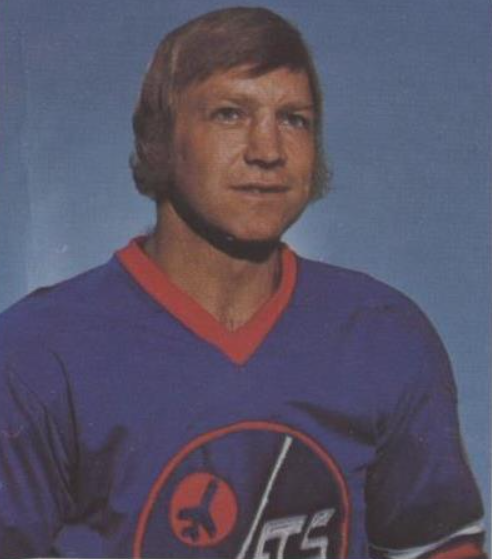
Bobby Hull was the first star of the WHA and Jets franchise, playing in every season for Winnipeg.

On December 27, 1971, Winnipeg was granted one of the founding franchises in the World Hockey Association (WHA). The original owner was Ben Hatskin, a local figure who made his wealth in cardboard shipping containers. The team took their name from Hatskin's Winnipeg Jets of the Western Canada Hockey League (WCHL). The Jets' first signing was Norm Beaudin in 1972 (earning the player the moniker of "the Original Jet"). Ab McDonald was the Jets' first captain. The first major signing was Bobby Hull, with a record $1 million signing bonus. Already known as "the Golden Jet," Hull was hired by Hatskin for a full package worth at least US$2.5 million, and on June 27, 1972, Hull jumped from the NHL to the WHL, at which point he had more goals than any other active player in the NHL. He had signed a 10-year contract to play and coach with the Jets. Hull played with the team until 1979. Hull's acquisition, partially financed by the rest of the WHA's teams, gave the league instant credibility and paved the way for other NHL stars to bolt to the upstart league.

The Jets were the first North American club to seriously explore Europe as a source of ice hockey talent. Winnipeg's fortunes were bolstered by acquisitions such as Swedish forwards Anders Hedberg and Ulf Nilsson, who starred with Hull on the WHA's most famous and successful forward line (nicknamed "the Hot Line"), and defenceman Lars-Erik Sjöberg, who would serve as the team's captain and win accolades as the WHA's best defenceman. Behind these players and other European stars such as Willy Lindström, Kent Nilsson, Veli-Pekka Ketola, leavened by players such as Peter Sullivan, Norm Beaudin and goaltender Joe Daley.

Their European players had to adapt to a more violent style of play in Canada, in some cases speaking out against the style. Hull, who had over 303 goals over seven seasons with the Winnipeg Jets from 1972 to 1979, had chronic traumatic encephalopathy when he died in 2023, donating his brain for research on the disease.

The Jets' first game in the WHA was played against the New York Raiders on October 12, 1972, in Madison Square Garden. Among members of the squad at that time were Ab McDonald, Joe Daley, Dunc Rousseau, Duke Asmundson and Bill Sutherland. Team captain Ab McDonald scored the first goal of their WHA era.

==== Games and championships ====
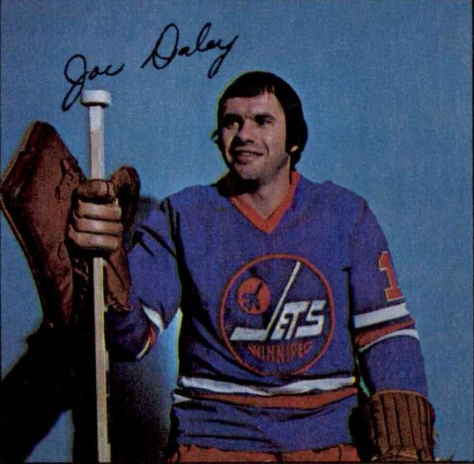
Joe Daley played in every season of the WHA for Winnipeg.

The Jets were the most successful team in the short-lived WHA. In the 1975-76 WHA playoffs, the Winnipeg Jets won the Avco Cup, led by Bobby Hull, Anders Hedberg and Ulf Nilsson. It was the first team in North America to win with a European Core, according to the Winnipeg Sun. The team made the finals in five of the WHA's seven seasons, winning the Avco World Trophy three times, including in the league's final season against Wayne Gretzky and the Edmonton Oilers, with Tom McVie as Jets' coach. Another notable accomplishment was the Jets' 5–3 victory over the Soviet Union national team on January 5, 1978. In the WHA's last season, Kent Nilsson scored 107 points, while Morris Lukowich had 65 goals, and Peter Sullivan had 46 goals and 86 points. During the 1979 Avco Cup Finals, Gary Smith gave up the last goal in WHA history to Dave Semenko in a 7–3 win against the Oilers.

The 1975–76, 1977–78 and 1978–79 Avco Cup-winning Winnipeg Jets teams were inducted into the Manitoba Hockey Hall of Fame in the team category. They became the first Canadian team to win the Avco Cup with their victory in the 1976 WHA playoffs over the Houston Aeros with their blazing passing and speed; it was the first championship for the city since the Winnipeg Blue Bombers won the Grey Cup in 1962.

=== The NHL years (1979–1996) ===
By 1978–79, the vast majority of the WHA's teams had folded, but the Jets were still going strong. After the season, the Jets were absorbed into the NHL along with the Quebec Nordiques, Edmonton Oilers and Hartford Whalers. Pre-merger inter-league exhibitions had shown that the 1978–79 Jets were the competitive equal of most NHL teams, with the possible exceptions of the three-time defending Stanley Cup champion, the Montreal Canadiens, and the rising New York Islanders.

However, the Jets had to pay a very high price for a berth in the more established league. They had to give up three of their top six scorers – the core of the last WHA champion – in the 1979 NHL expansion draft, and were also forced to draft 18th out of 21 teams. In the expansion draft, they opted to protect defenceman Scott Campbell, who had shown a good deal of promise in the last WHA season. However, Campbell suffered from chronic asthma that was only exacerbated by Winnipeg's frigid weather. The asthma drove him out of the league entirely by 1982.

Upon entering the NHL, the Jets were put in the Smythe Division of the Campbell Conference. However, with a decimated roster, the Jets finished at the bottom in overall league standings during their first two seasons in the NHL, including a horrendous nine-win season in 1980–81 that still ranks as the worst in the Jets/Coyotes history. This stands in marked contrast to the other 1979 Avco Cup finalist, the Oilers, who went on to dominate the league during the second half of the 1980s.

The Jets' first two wretched NHL seasons did net them high draft picks; in the 1980 draft they picked Dave Babych second overall and in 1981 they drafted future Hall of Fame member Dale Hawerchuk first overall. The team developed a solid core of players by the mid-1980s, with Hawerchuk, Thomas Steen, Paul MacLean, Randy Carlyle, Laurie Boschman, Doug Smail, and David Ellett providing a strong nucleus. Also in 1981, a league-wide realignment placed the Jets with the league's other Central Time Zone teams in the Norris Division, which over the course of the decade would become the weakest division in the league.

Led by Hawerchuk, Steen, Babych and Carlyle, the Jets returned to respectability fairly quickly, and made the playoffs 11 times in the next 15 years. However, regular season success did not transfer over into the playoffs. This was because after just one season in the Norris Division, the relocation of the Colorado Rockies to New Jersey compelled Winnipeg to return to the more competitive Smythe Division along with the Oilers and Calgary Flames – by some accounts, the two best teams in the league during the second half of the 1980s. Due to the way the playoffs were structured at the time, whenever the Jets made the playoffs, they faced the near-certainty of having to beat either the Oilers or the Flames (or both) to get to the Campbell Conference finals. At the time, the top four teams in each division made the playoffs, with the regular season division winner playing against the fourth-placed team and the regular season runner-up playing the third-placed team in the division semifinals. The division semifinals winners advanced to the division finals, and the two division finals winners would meet in the conference finals.

For example, in 1984–85, they finished with the fourth-best record in the entire league (behind only Philadelphia, Edmonton and Washington). They also notched 96 points, which would remain the franchise's best as an NHL team until the 2009–10 Coyotes racked up the franchise's second 100-point season (and first as an NHL team). However, they finished second in the division behind the Oilers. While they managed to dispatch the Flames (with the league's fifth-best record) in four games in the best-of-five division semifinals, they were swept by the eventual Stanley Cup champion Oilers in the division finals. In fact, Winnipeg and Edmonton played each other in the playoffs six times between 1983 and 1990. The Oilers not only won every series, but also held the Jets to only four total victories. Five times (1984, 1985, 1987, 1988, and 1990), the Oilers went on to win the Stanley Cup. The Jets won only one more playoff series in 1987 (defeating Calgary in the division semifinals before losing to Edmonton in the division finals). It was not until the 1993–94 season that further expansion and re-alignment placed the Jets in the Central Division of the Western Conference. By this time however, the Central was at least the competitive equal to the Pacific Division and the strict division-based playoff bracket had been abandoned.

==== Demise and relocation to Phoenix ====
As the NHL expanded in the United States and free agency rules were liberalized, operating costs and salaries grew rapidly; players had the leverage to demand being paid in U.S. dollars league-wide. Until about the early 1990s, Canadian teams were able to pay their players in Canadian dollars, with the exceptions being contracts acquired in trades from U.S. teams. However, since the Canadian teams still collected most of their revenue in Canadian dollars, having to pay players in U.S. dollars proved to be a serious drain on finances given the declining value of the Canadian dollar. For most of their NHL tenure, Winnipeg was the league's second-smallest market, and was set to become the smallest market after the Quebec Nordiques moved to Denver as the Colorado Avalanche in 1995–96. Despite a loyal fan following, serious doubts were raised about whether Winnipeg could continue to support an NHL team. Additionally, their home arena, Winnipeg Arena, was over 40 years old, had no luxury suites, and numerous obstructed-view seats.

Under the ownership of Barry Shenkarow in 1996, the team was unable to find financing to replace its aging Winnipeg Arena, with government assistance at the time not achievable, according to the New York Times. The Winnipeg Arena, constructed in 1955, failed to generate "ancillary revenues" to support the team enough to compete in the NHL.

Faced with mounting losses, Jets owner Barry Shenkarow agreed to sell the team to American businessmen Steven Gluckstern and Richard Burke for $65 million. They planned to move the team to the Minneapolis–Saint Paul region, which had lost the Minnesota North Stars to Dallas before the 1993–94 season. In response, a local consortium called the Spirit of Manitoba was assembled. While they persuaded Shenkarow to delay the proposed sale to American interests long enough that the Jets ultimately remained in Winnipeg for the 1995–96 season, it eventually became apparent that the Spirit of Manitoba consortium was far too undercapitalized to purchase the franchise and underwrite expected losses while a proposed new arena was built.

Meanwhile, Gluckstern and Burke failed to reach an agreement with the Minneapolis to share the Target Center with the National Basketball Association's Minnesota Timberwolves. They purchased the team nevertheless, but with no suitable alternate venues in the Twin Cities area, the Jets' new owners reached an agreement with Jerry Colangelo, owner of the NBA's Phoenix Suns, to move the team to Phoenix and rename them to Phoenix Coyotes.

In April 1996, they won a 4–1 victory over the Calgary Flames, progressing towards the playoffs. The Jets managed to qualify for the 1996 Stanley Cup playoffs in their final season in Winnipeg, and played their last game on April 28, 1996, a home playoff loss to the Detroit Red Wings by a score of 4–1. Norm Maciver scored the last goal in Jets history. According to CBC, the Jets were reluctant to leave Winnipeg, where they had a strong fanbase. According to Sports Illustrated, Keith Tkachuk was the "American face of the franchise as it moved to Phoenix, racking up 98 points in the final Winnipeg season."

=== Aftermath ===
Winnipeg was not left without a professional ice hockey team for the 1996–97 season as the International Hockey League's Minnesota Moose moved to Winnipeg to become the Manitoba Moose a few months after the Jets left.

The NHL ultimately returned to Winnipeg 15 years later, with the Atlanta Thrashers relocating to become the second incarnation of the Jets franchise which is owned by True North Sports & Entertainment. Prior to this, True North submitted a series of bids for the financially-troubled Coyotes in October 2009 with the intention of returning the team back to its original city, which were taken seriously enough that the league drew up a tentative schedule with Winnipeg in place of Phoenix. The NHL shelved the bid after securing a large subsidy from the Coyotes' municipal government. As True North's low-key approach was praised by NHL commissioner Gary Bettman, this placed True North in a favorable position once question of the Thrashers' relocation came up. The new Jets, despite reclaiming the name and subsequently the original franchise's logos, retained the Thrashers franchise records rather than the records of the original Jets. In 2015, when the new Jets made the playoffs, Winnipeg saw its first NHL postseason home game since 1996.

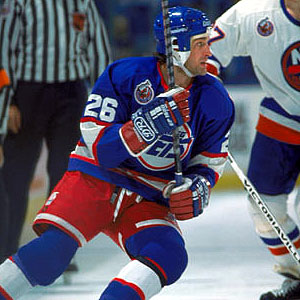
Dean Kennedy played with the Jets from 1991 to 1994

During their history, the Jets retired two numbers: Bobby Hull's no. 9 and Thomas Steen's no. 25. The Coyotes have continued to honour those numbers, and hang their banners in the Jets' old blue-red-white colour scheme. Dale Hawerchuk's no. 10 was added in 2006, in the Coyotes' sand-red-black scheme. Another tradition that was retained when the franchise moved to Phoenix was the "whiteout", in which fans wore all white to home playoff games.

Shane Doan, drafted seventh overall by the Jets in the 1995 NHL entry draft prior to their last season in Winnipeg, and who played his rookie season in Winnipeg, was the last original Jets player to still be active in the NHL (and to still be with the franchise) upon his retirement in 2017. The only other former original Jets player playing professionally by that time was Deron Quint, who played in the Deutsche Eishockey Liga (DEL) in Germany until 2017.

The current Winnipeg Jets have acknowledged the original Jets' history on a number of occasions. The original franchise's division and Avco Cup championships hang atop the rafters of Canada Life Centre, as are the honoured numbers of the original Jets who were inducted into the current Jets' Hall of Fame. They have also worn throwback uniforms of the original Jets on a few occasions, and brought back the whiteout tradition in the Stanley Cup playoffs. The new franchise acquired the trademarks to the name and logo of the original Jets from the NHL when it moved to Winnipeg – at the time, the league directly owned the Coyotes and thus controlled the Jets' trademarks. However, the franchise's records still belong to the Coyotes.

In April 2024, after years of instability, the Coyotes suspended operations, with their assets (including players and hockey operations staff) being transferred to the new Utah Mammoth. Unlike the Thrashers' relocation to Winnipeg (which saw all records transferred), the Coyotes entered inactivity, with their intellectual property remaining in Phoenix. Coyotes owner Alex Meruelo was granted a five-year window to construct a new arena in the Phoenix area, upon which automatic expansion would have been triggered to "re-activate" the Coyotes. However, in late June, Meruelo opted to discontinue his efforts to build an arena and re-activate the team, ceding the Coyotes intellectual property back to the NHL. On September 24, 2026, the NHL ceded the records belonging to the Jets before their move to Phoenix to the current Jets franchise.

== Uniforms ==
The Jets debuted in the WHA wearing blue and white uniforms with red trim. White uniforms featured a blue shoulder yoke, blue numbers and blue-white-red-white-blue waist, sock and sleeve stripes. The blue uniforms were the inverse of their white counterparts minus the contrasting yoke and used red numbers. In the franchise's first season, the uniforms featured the futuristic "Jets" wordmark in front along with red or white player nameplates. Starting in 1974, the Jets donned their "classic" look, ditching the contrast-colour nameplates and unveiling their famous roundel logo. In 1977, the Jets added a white shoulder yoke on the blue uniform, and the following season, switched from red to blue pants.

Upon moving to the NHL in 1979, the Jets unveiled new uniforms. Then-general manager John Ferguson Sr. had been derided for changing the classic New York Rangers uniforms during the late 1970s, so he brought most elements of that design to the Jets. Both uniforms featured a thick shoulder stripe that extended through the sleeves, along with another thick stripe on the waist. In addition, the blue uniforms now featured white numbers with red trim and a white inverse of the team's logo in front. In 1987, the Jets added a "Goals for Kids" patch which remained a prominent figure on the uniforms until the relocation.

In 1990, the Jets unveiled their final uniform design, featuring the updated crest in front and contrasting sleeve and waist stripes. They also switched back to red pants.

In 2016, for several games the team wore "heritage classic" jerseys combining characteristics of both its old and recent jerseys, earning note in the press.

The current incarnation of the Winnipeg Jets employs a different uniform design and logo, although they occasionally use the "old" Jets uniform as an alternate jersey. For the 2020–21 season, a "Reverse Retro" jersey was introduced in collaboration with Adidas. The jersey was designed to emulate the original Jets' 1979–1990 look, but used colours of the current Jets. Before the 2021–22 season, the blue WHA-era uniform the modern-day Jets wore in the 2019 Heritage Classic became the team's third jersey. A second "Reverse Retro" jersey, this time a recoloured version of the 1990–1996 Jets white uniform, was released in the 2022–23 season.

== Winnipeg whiteout ==
The Winnipeg whiteout is a tradition that dates back to 1987 when fans were asked to wear white clothing to home playoff games, creating a very intimidating effect and atmosphere. It was created as a response to the "C of Red" created by fans of the Calgary Flames, whom the hometown Jets were facing in the first round of the 1987 Stanley Cup playoffs. The Jets eliminated the Flames in six games, and fans wore white for every home playoff game thereafter. Fans dubbed it the "White Out" which is a prairie term for a winter snow storm. Marketing for the team during the playoff referred to the "charge of the white brigade". In later years, marketing referred to the whiteout as "White Noise".

Fans of the American Hockey League's Manitoba Moose also continued this tradition when the team briefly relocated to St. John's, Newfoundland and Labrador, as the St. John's IceCaps, as did fans of the "IceCap's White Out" respectively. and "Coyotes White Out", When the Thrashers moved to Winnipeg as the second incarnation of the Jets, they brought back the whiteout tradition for all playoff appearances of the Jets.

== Season-by-season record ==
Key of terms and abbreviations
| Term or abbreviation | Definition |
|---|---|
| Finish | Final position in division or league standings |
| GP | Number of games played |
| W | Number of wins |
| L | Number of losses |
| T | Number of ties |
| Pts | Number of points |
| GF | Goals for (goals scored by the Jets) |
| GA | Goals against (goals scored by the Jets' opponents) |
| — | Does not apply |

=== WHA era ===
| Season | Team season | Division | Regular season | | | | | | | | Postseason (Note: The result of the playoff series shows the team's result first regardless of the outcome, followed by the opposing team in parentheses.) | | | | | |
| Season | Team season | Division | Finish | GP | W | L | T | Pts | GF | GA | GP | W | L | GF | GA | Result |
|---|---|---|---|---|---|---|---|---|---|---|---|---|---|---|---|---|
| 1972–73 | 1972–73 | Western | 1st | 78 | 43 | 31 | 4 | 90 | 285 | 249 | 14 | 9 | 5 | 55 | 49 | Won quarterfinals, 4–1 (Fighting Saints); Won semifinals, 4–0 (Aeros); Lost Avco Cup Finals, 1–4 (Whalers) |
| 1973–74 | 1973–74 | Western | 4th | 78 | 34 | 39 | 5 | 73 | 264 | 296 | 4 | 0 | 4 | 9 | 23 | Lost quarterfinals, 0–4 (Aeros) |
| 1974–75 | 1974–75 | Canadian | 3rd | 78 | 38 | 35 | 5 | 81 | 322 | 293 | — | — | — | — | — | Did not qualify |
| 1975–76 | 1975–76 | Canadian | 1st | 81 | 52 | 27 | 2 | 106 | 345 | 254 | 13 | 12 | 1 | 68 | 35 | Won quarterfinals, 4–0 (Oilers); Won semifinals, 4–1 (Cowboys); Won Avco Cup Finals, 4–0 (Aeros) |
| 1976–77 | 1976–77 | Western | 2nd | 80 | 46 | 32 | 2 | 94 | 366 | 291 | 19 | 11 | 8 | 80 | 73 | Won quarterfinals, 4–3 (Mariners); Won semifinals, 4–2 (Aeros); Lost Avco Cup Finals, 3–4 (Nordiques) |
| 1977–78 | 1977–78 | — (Note: Divisions were abolished in 1977–78 and 1978–79 seasons.) | 1st | 80 | 50 | 28 | 2 | 102 | 381 | 270 | 9 | 8 | 1 | 53 | 20 | Won semifinals, 4–1 (Bulls); Won Avco Cup Finals, 4–0 (Whalers) |
| 1978–79 | 1978–79 | — | 3rd | 80 | 39 | 35 | 6 | 84 | 307 | 306 | 10 | 8 | 2 | 51 | 38 | Won semifinals, 4–0 (Nordiques); Won Avco Cup Finals, 4–2 (Oilers) |
| WHA totals (Note: WHA totals as of the completion of the 1978–79 season.) | | | | 555 | 302 | 227 | 26 | 630 | 2,270 | 1,958 | 69 | 48 | 21 | 316 | 238 | 6 playoff appearances |

=== NHL era ===
| Season | Team season | Conference | Division | Regular season | | | | | | | | Postseason | | | | | |
| Season | Team season | Conference | Division | Finish | GP | W | L | T | Pts | GF | GA | GP | W | L | GF | GA | Result |
|---|---|---|---|---|---|---|---|---|---|---|---|---|---|---|---|---|---|
| 1979–80 | 1979–80 | Campbell | Smythe | 5th | 80 | 20 | 49 | 11 | 51 | 214 | 314 | — | — | — | — | — | Did not qualify |
| 1980–81 | 1980–81 | Campbell | Smythe | 5th | 80 | 9 | 57 | 14 | 32 | 246 | 400 | — | — | — | — | — | Did not qualify |
| 1981–82 | 1981–82 | Campbell | Norris | 2nd | 80 | 33 | 33 | 14 | 80 | 319 | 332 | 4 | 1 | 3 | 13 | 20 | Lost in division semifinals, 1–3 (Blues) |
| 1982–83 | 1982–83 | Campbell | Smythe | 4th | 80 | 33 | 39 | 8 | 74 | 311 | 333 | 3 | 0 | 3 | 9 | 14 | Lost in division semifinals, 0–3 (Oilers) |
| 1983–84 | 1983–84 | Campbell | Smythe | 4th | 80 | 31 | 38 | 11 | 73 | 340 | 374 | 3 | 0 | 3 | 7 | 18 | Lost in division semifinals, 0–3 (Oilers) |
| 1984–85 | 1984–85 | Campbell | Smythe | 2nd | 80 | 43 | 27 | 10 | 96 | 358 | 332 | 8 | 3 | 5 | 26 | 35 | Won in division semifinals, 3–1 (Flames); Lost in division finals, 0–4 (Oilers) |
| 1985–86 | 1985–86 | Campbell | Smythe | 3rd | 80 | 26 | 47 | 7 | 59 | 295 | 372 | 3 | 0 | 3 | 8 | 15 | Lost in division semifinals, 0–3 (Flames) |
| 1986–87 | 1986–87 | Campbell | Smythe | 3rd | 80 | 40 | 32 | 8 | 88 | 279 | 310 | 10 | 4 | 6 | 31 | 32 | Won in division semifinals, 4–2 (Flames); Lost in division finals, 0–4 (Oilers) |
| 1987–88 | 1987–88 | Campbell | Smythe | 3rd | 80 | 33 | 36 | 11 | 77 | 292 | 310 | 5 | 1 | 4 | 17 | 25 | Lost in division semifinals, 1–4 (Oilers) |
| 1988–89 | 1988–89 | Campbell | Smythe | 5th | 80 | 26 | 42 | 12 | 64 | 300 | 355 | — | — | — | — | — | Did not qualify |
| 1989–90 | 1989–90 | Campbell | Smythe | 3rd | 80 | 37 | 32 | 11 | 85 | 298 | 290 | 7 | 3 | 4 | 22 | 24 | Lost in division semifinals, 3–4 (Oilers) |
| 1990–91 | 1990–91 | Campbell | Smythe | 5th | 80 | 26 | 43 | 11 | 63 | 260 | 288 | — | — | — | — | — | Did not qualify |
| 1991–92 | 1991–92 | Campbell | Smythe | 4th | 80 | 33 | 32 | 15 | 81 | 251 | 244 | 7 | 3 | 4 | 17 | 29 | Lost in division semifinals, 3–4 (Canucks) |
| 1992–93 | 1992–93 | Campbell | Smythe | 4th | 84 | 40 | 37 | 7 | 87 | 322 | 320 | 6 | 2 | 4 | 17 | 21 | Lost in division semifinals, 2–4 (Canucks) |
| 1993–94 | 1993–94 | Western | Central | 6th | 84 | 24 | 51 | 9 | 57 | 245 | 344 | — | — | — | — | — | Did not qualify |
| 1994–95 (Note: Season was shortened due to the 1994–95 NHL lockout.) | 1994–95 | Western | Central | 6th | 48 | 16 | 25 | 7 | 39 | 157 | 177 | — | — | — | — | — | Did not qualify |
| 1995–96 | 1995–96 | Western | Central | 5th | 82 | 36 | 40 | 6 | 78 | 275 | 291 | 6 | 2 | 4 | 10 | 20 | Lost in conference quarterfinals, 2–4 (Red Wings) |
Inactive from 1996 to 1999. The NHL then awarded an expansion franchise in Atlanta as the Atlanta Thrashers in 1999.
| NHL totals (Note: NHL totals as of the completion of the 1995–96 season.) | | | | | 1,338 | 506 | 660 | 172 | 1,184 | 4,762 | 5,347 | 62 | 19 | 43 | 178 | 255 | 11 playoff appearances |

== Notable players ==
=== Team captains ===
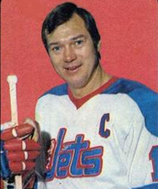
Ab McDonald was the first captain of the Jets.

Note: This list includes Jets captains from both the NHL and WHA.

- Ab McDonald, 1972–1974
- Dan Johnson, 1974–1975
- Lars-Erik Sjöberg, 1975–1978
- Barry Long, 1978–1979
- Lars-Erik Sjöberg, 1979–1980
- Morris Lukowich, 1980–1981
- Dave Christian, 1981–1982
- Lucien DeBlois, 1982–1984
- Dale Hawerchuk, 1984–1989
- Dale Hawerchuk, Thomas Steen and Randy Carlyle, 1989–1990 (tri-captains)
- Thomas Steen and Randy Carlyle, 1990–1991 (co-captains)
- Troy Murray, 1991–1993
- Dean Kennedy, 1993
- Keith Tkachuk, 1993–1995
- Kris King, 1995–1996

=== First-round draft picks ===
Note: This list includes draft picks from both the NHL and WHA.

- 1973: Ron Andruff (11th overall)
- 1974: Randy Andreachuk (7th overall)
- 1975: Brad Gassoff (8th overall)
- 1976: Thomas Gradin (9th overall)
- 1977: Ron Duguay (3rd overall)
- 1978: no WHA draft
- 1979: Jimmy Mann (19th overall)
- 1980: Dave Babych (2nd overall)
- 1981: Dale Hawerchuk (1st overall)
- 1982: Jim Kyte (12th overall)
- 1983: Andrew McBain (8th overall) and Bobby Dollas (14th overall)
- 1985: Ryan Stewart (18th overall)
- 1986: Pat Elynuik (8th overall)
- 1987: Bryan Marchment (16th overall)
- 1988: Teemu Selänne (10th overall)
- 1989: Stu Barnes (4th overall)
- 1990: Keith Tkachuk (19th overall)
- 1991: Aaron Ward (5th overall)
- 1992: Sergei Bautin (17th overall)
- 1993: Mats Lindgren (15th overall)
- 1995: Shane Doan (7th overall)

=== Hall of Famers ===
- Dale Hawerchuk, C, 1981–1990, inducted 2001
- Phil Housley, D, 1990–1993, inducted 2015
- Bobby Hull, LW, 1972–1980, inducted 1983
- Serge Savard, D, 1981–1983, inducted 1986
- Teemu Selänne, RW, 1992–1996, inducted 2017
- Keith Tkachuk, LW, 1991–1996, inducted 2026

=== Retired numbers ===
The original Winnipeg Jets retired two numbers in their history. When the Jets relocated to Arizona, the banners of these players also made the move, and these numbers originally remain retired with the Arizona Coyotes, in Jets' colors. Beginning with the 2014–15 season, those numbers were unretired and brought back to circulation; they were still inducted as part of the Arizona Coyotes Ring of Honor. After the move to Arizona, number 10 was inducted in honor of Dale Hawerchuk, number 7 was inducted for Keith Tkachuk, and number 27 was inducted for Teppo Numminen. Shane Doan's number 19 was the only number officially retired by the Coyotes.

The current Winnipeg Jets (formerly Atlanta Thrashers) also honoured both numbers in the Winnipeg Jets Hall of Fame.

Winnipeg Jets retired numbers
| No. | Player | Position | Career | No. retirement |
|---|---|---|---|---|
| 9^{1} | Bobby Hull | LW | 1972–1980 | February 19, 1989 |
| 25 | Thomas Steen | RW | 1981–1995 | May 6, 1995 |

Notes:

- ^{1} Bobby Hull's number was temporarily unretired by the successor Coyotes franchise for Bobby's son Brett in the 2005–06 season before his son Brett retired five games into that season.

== Franchise records ==
=== Franchise scoring leaders ===
These are the top-ten-point-scorers in Winnipeg Jets history, combining NHL and WHA totals.

Legend: Pos = position; GP = gpmes played; G = goals; A = assists; Pts = points; P/G = points per game

Points
| Player | Pos | GP | G | A | Pts | P/G |
|---|---|---|---|---|---|---|
| Dale Hawerchuk | C | 713 | 379 | 550 | 929 | 1.30 |
| Thomas Steen | RW | 950 | 264 | 553 | 817 | .86 |
| Bobby Hull | LW | 429 | 307 | 341 | 648 | 1.51 |
| Paul MacLean | RW | 527 | 248 | 270 | 518 | .98 |
| Ulf Nilsson | C | 300 | 140 | 344 | 484 | 1.61 |
| Anders Hedberg | RW | 286 | 236 | 222 | 458 | 1.60 |
| Willy Lindström | RW | 604 | 220 | 229 | 449 | .74 |
| Morris Lukowich | LW | 511 | 233 | 213 | 446 | .87 |
| Doug Smail | LW | 691 | 189 | 208 | 397 | .58 |
| Laurie Boschman | LW | 526 | 152 | 227 | 379 | .72 |

=== Individual records ===
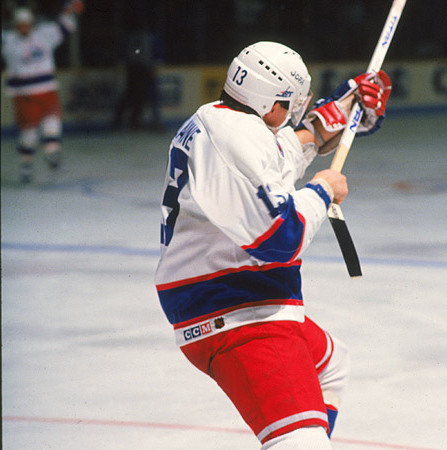
Teemu Selänne celebrates breaking NHL rookie goal record

==== WHA records ====
- Games (career) – Bobby Hull, 411
- Goals (career) – Bobby Hull, 303
- Assists (career) – Ulf Nilsson, 344
- Points (career) – Bobby Hull, 638
- Penalty minutes (career) – Kim Clackson, 413
- Most wins (career) – Joe Daley, 167
- Shutouts (career) – Joe Daley, 12

==== Season records ====
- Most goals in a season – Bobby Hull, 77 (1974–75)
  - Most goals in an NHL season – Teemu Selänne, 76 (1992–93; NHL rookie record)
- Most assists in a season – Phil Housley, 79 (1992–93)
- Most points in a season – Bobby Hull, 142 (1974–75)
  - Most points in an NHL season – Teemu Selänne, 132 (1992–93; NHL rookie record)
- Most penalty minutes in a season – Tie Domi, 347 (1993–94)
- Most points in a season, defenceman – Phil Housley, 97 (1992–93)
- Most points in a season, rookie – Teemu Selänne, 132 (1992–93; NHL record)
- Most wins in a season – Joe Daley, 41 (1975–76)
  - Most wins in an NHL season – Brian Hayward (1984–85) and Bob Essensa (1992–93), 33

== See also ==
- List of Winnipeg Jets (1972–1996) head coaches
- Avco World Trophy
- List of defunct and relocated National Hockey League teams
- List of ice hockey teams in Manitoba
- Atlanta Thrashers
