= 1983–84 Winnipeg Jets season =

NHL hockey team season

1983–84 Winnipeg Jets
- Division: 4th Smythe
- Conference: 5th Campbell
- 1983–84 record: 31–38–11
- Home record: 17–15–8
- Road record: 14–23–3
- Goals for: 340
- Goals against: 374

Team information
- General manager: John Ferguson
- Coach: Tom Watt
- Captain: Lucien DeBlois
- Alternate captains: None
- Arena: Winnipeg Arena

Team leaders
- Goals: Paul MacLean (40)
- Assists: Dale Hawerchuk (65)
- Points: Dale Hawerchuk (102)
- Penalty minutes: Laurie Boschman (234)
- Wins: Doug Soetaert (18)
- Goals against average: Doug Soetaert (4.29)

The 1983–84 Winnipeg Jets season was the 12th season of the Winnipeg Jets, their fifth season in the National Hockey League (NHL). The Jets placed fourth in the Smythe to qualify for the playoffs. The Jets lost to the Edmonton Oilers in the first round.

== Offseason ==
On June 8, 1983, the Jets traded former team captain Dave Christian to the Washington Capitals for the Capitals first round draft pick in the 1983 NHL entry draft. Christian, who lost his captaincy midway through the 1982–83 season, had 79 goals and 209 points in 230 games with Winnipeg since breaking into the NHL one week after winning the gold medal with the 1980 US Olympic Team.

At the 1983 NHL entry draft, the Jets first selection was with the eighth overall pick, and the team drafted winger Andrew McBain from the North Bay Centennials of the OHL. McBain had 33 goals and 120 points with the Centennials in the 1982–83 season. Six picks later, at 14th overall, which the Jets had acquired from the Washington Capitals in the Dave Christian trade, Winnipeg selected defenseman Bobby Dollas from the Laval Voisins of the QMJHL. Dollas had 16 goals and 61 points with Laval during the 1982–83 season. Later, in the fourth round, the Jets selected goaltender Bob Essensa from the Henry Carr Crusaders Jr. B team.

The Jets made a few minor transactions during the off-season, trading Norm Dupont to the Hartford Whalers for the Whalers fourth round draft pick in the 1984 NHL entry draft, and releasing Bryan Maxwell and Larry Hopkins. The Jets biggest trade was acquiring Tim Young from the Minnesota North Stars for Craig Levie and Tom Ward. Young spent eight seasons with the North Stars, and had 18 goals and 53 points in 70 games with Minnesota during the 1982–83 season.

== Regular season ==
=== Final standings ===
Smythe Division
	GP	W	L	T	GF	GA	Pts
**Edmonton Oilers**	80	57	18	5	446	314	119
**Calgary Flames**	80	34	32	14	311	314	82
**Vancouver Canucks**	80	32	39	9	306	328	73
**Winnipeg Jets**	80	31	38	11	340	374	73
Los Angeles Kings	80	23	44	13	309	376	59

Note: GP = Games played, W = Wins, L = Losses, T = Ties, Pts = Points, GF = Goals for, GA = Goals against
Note: Teams that qualified for the playoffs are highlighted in bold.

=== Record vs. opponents ===
Smythe Division record vs. opponents

==== Vs. Campbell Conference ====
**Vs. Smythe Division**

1983–84 NHL records
Team	**CGY**	**EDM**	**LAK**	**VAN**	**WIN**	**Total**
Calgary	—	0−7−1	4−3−1	5−2−1	4−1−3	**13−13−6**
Edmonton	7−0−1	—	6−2	6−1−1	8−0	**27−3−2**
Los Angeles	3−4−1	2−6	—	4−3−1	0−5−3	**9−18−5**
Vancouver	2−5−1	1−6−1	3−4−1	—	5−2−1	**11−17−4**
Winnipeg	1−4−3	0−8	5−0−3	2−5−1	—	**8−17−7**

**Vs. Norris Division**

1983–84 NHL records
Team	**CHI**	**DET**	**MIN**	**STL**	**TOR**	**Total**
Calgary	2−1	1−2	2−1	2−0−1	1−0−2	**8−4−3**
Edmonton	2−1	3−0	2−0−1	1−2	2−1	**10−4−1**
Los Angeles	3−0	2−0−1	1−1−1	1−1−1	0−2−1	**7−4−4**
Vancouver	1−2	2−1	1−1−1	1−2	1−0−2	**6−6−3**
Winnipeg	2−1	0−1−2	1−2	2−1	3−0	**8−5−2**

**Vs. Wales Conference**

**Vs. Adams Division**

1983–84 NHL records
Team	**BOS**	**BUF**	**HFD**	**MTL**	**QUE**	**Total**
Calgary	0−2−1	0−3	2−0−1	1−2	1−2	**4−9−2**
Edmonton	2−1	2−1	2−1	2−1	3−0	**11−4−0**
Los Angeles	0−3	0−2−1	1−2	2−1	0−3	**3−11−1**
Vancouver	0−2−1	0−3	3−0	2−1	2−1	**7−7−1**
Winnipeg	1−2	0−3	2−0−1	1−1−1	2−1	**6−7−2**

**Vs. Patrick Division**

1983–84 NHL records
Team	**NJD**	**NYI**	**NYR**	**PHI**	**PIT**	**WSH**	**Total**
Calgary	2−0−1	3−0	1−2	1−2	1−0−2	1−2	**9−6−3**
Edmonton	2−0−1	0−3	2−1	0−2−1	3−0	2−1	**9−7−2**
Los Angeles	1−2	0−2−1	0−1−2	1−2	2−1	0−3	**4−11−3**
Vancouver	2−1	0−3	1−1–1	2−1	2−1	1−2	**8−9−1**
Winnipeg	2−1	2−1	1−2	1−2	2−1	1−2	**9−9−0**

== Schedule and results ==
1983–84 regular season
October

Game	Result	Date	Score	Opponent	Record	Attendance
1	T	October 5, 1983	6–6 OT	Detroit Red Wings (1983–84)	0–0–1	11,348
2	L	October 7, 1983	6–8	Edmonton Oilers (1983–84)	0–1–1	11,073
3	T	October 9, 1983	1–1 OT	Calgary Flames (1983–84)	0–1–2	11,108
4	W	October 12, 1983	4–3 OT	@ Pittsburgh Penguins (1983–84)	1–1–2	4,095
5	L	October 13, 1983	3–4	@ Philadelphia Flyers (1983–84)	1–2–2	15,694
6	L	October 15, 1983	1–2	@ Minnesota North Stars (1983–84)	1–3–2	13,974
7	L	October 19, 1983	2–12	Montreal Canadiens (1983–84)	1–4–2	12,632
8	L	October 23, 1983	2–5	@ Buffalo Sabres (1983–84)	1–5–2	10,455
9	W	October 25, 1983	4–2	@ New York Islanders (1983–84)	2–5–2	14,928
10	W	October 26, 1983	7–5	@ New York Rangers (1983–84)	3–5–2	17,416
11	L	October 28, 1983	1–7	@ Calgary Flames (1983–84)	3–6–2	16,764
12	L	October 30, 1983	3–7	Washington Capitals (1983–84)	3–7–2	10,803

November

Game	Result	Date	Score	Opponent	Record	Attendance
13	L	November 2, 1983	3–6	Pittsburgh Penguins (1983–84)	3–8–2	10,106
14	W	November 4, 1983	8–2	Toronto Maple Leafs (1983–84)	4–8–2	12,994
15	L	November 6, 1983	5–8	Edmonton Oilers (1983–84)	4–9–2	13,376
16	W	November 9, 1983	7–2	@ Vancouver Canucks (1983–84)	5–9–2	11,676
17	L	November 11, 1983	2–4	@ Vancouver Canucks (1983–84)	5–10–2	14,755
18	W	November 13, 1983	3–2	Philadelphia Flyers (1983–84)	6–10–2	14,294
19	L	November 16, 1983	5–6 OT	Buffalo Sabres (1983–84)	6–11–2	10,312
20	L	November 19, 1983	7–8 OT	@ Minnesota North Stars (1983–84)	6–12–2	14,298
21	L	November 21, 1983	6–7	@ Edmonton Oilers (1983–84)	6–13–2	17,498
22	L	November 23, 1983	1–4	Vancouver Canucks (1983–84)	6–14–2	11,220
23	T	November 24, 1983	4–4 OT	@ Calgary Flames (1983–84)	6–14–3	16,764
24	W	November 29, 1983	6–5	@ Los Angeles Kings (1983–84)	7–14–3	7,699

December

Game	Result	Date	Score	Opponent	Record	Attendance
25	W	December 1, 1983	6–5 OT	@ Los Angeles Kings (1983–84)	8–14–3	7,646
26	W	December 4, 1983	7–5	Los Angeles Kings (1983–84)	9–14–3	9,989
27	L	December 7, 1983	3–6	@ New Jersey Devils (1983–84)	9–15–3	8,221
28	T	December 10, 1983	5–5 OT	@ Hartford Whalers (1983–84)	9–15–4	10,355
29	L	December 11, 1983	2–4	@ Boston Bruins (1983–84)	9–16–4	12,093
30	W	December 14, 1983	8–4	@ Toronto Maple Leafs (1983–84)	10–16–4	16,298
31	W	December 16, 1983	4–1	New Jersey Devils (1983–84)	11–16–4	9,845
32	L	December 18, 1983	5–7	Edmonton Oilers (1983–84)	11–17–4	15,107
33	L	December 19, 1983	6–7	@ Calgary Flames (1983–84)	11–18–4	16,764
34	L	December 21, 1983	4–7	@ Edmonton Oilers (1983–84)	11–19–4	17,498
35	W	December 23, 1983	6–3	St. Louis Blues (1983–84)	12–19–4	10,689
36	W	December 26, 1983	5–1	Minnesota North Stars (1983–84)	13–19–4	13,573
37	W	December 30, 1983	4–3 OT	New York Islanders (1983–84)	14–19–4	15,294

January

Game	Result	Date	Score	Opponent	Record	Attendance
38	T	January 1, 1984	3–3 OT	Calgary Flames (1983–84)	14–19–5	12,279
39	L	January 4, 1984	4–9	@ Buffalo Sabres (1983–84)	14–20–5	12,206
40	L	January 5, 1984	6–7 OT	@ Philadelphia Flyers (1983–84)	14–21–5	17,068
41	W	January 8, 1984	4–3	Hartford Whalers (1983–84)	15–21–5	11,037
42	L	January 11, 1984	5–9	@ Calgary Flames (1983–84)	15–22–5	16,764
43	T	January 13, 1984	7–7 OT	Los Angeles Kings (1983–84)	15–22–6	11,354
44	T	January 15, 1984	4–4 OT	Los Angeles Kings (1983–84)	15–22–7	11,559
45	L	January 17, 1984	3–8	@ Washington Capitals (1983–84)	15–23–7	9,878
46	W	January 18, 1984	5–4 OT	@ Pittsburgh Penguins (1983–84)	16–23–7	3,849
47	T	January 20, 1984	6–6 OT	Vancouver Canucks (1983–84)	16–23–8	12,826
48	W	January 22, 1984	6–4	Vancouver Canucks (1983–84)	17–23–8	11,713
49	W	January 24, 1984	5–3	@ Quebec Nordiques (1983–84)	18–23–8	15,077
50	W	January 26, 1984	6–2	@ Hartford Whalers (1983–84)	19–23–8	9,651
51	L	January 28, 1984	2–5	@ Boston Bruins (1983–84)	19–24–8	13,840

February

Game	Result	Date	Score	Opponent	Record	Attendance
52	W	February 3, 1984	7–3	Chicago Black Hawks (1983–84)	20–24–8	12,796
53	T	February 5, 1984	2–2 OT	Montreal Canadiens (1983–84)	20–24–9	15,579
54	L	February 8, 1984	1–3	New York Rangers (1983–84)	20–25–9	11,876
55	T	February 12, 1984	2–2 OT	Detroit Red Wings (1983–84)	20–25–10	11,194
56	L	February 15, 1984	4–7	@ Edmonton Oilers (1983–84)	20–26–10	17,498
57	L	February 17, 1984	3–6	Quebec Nordiques (1983–84)	20–27–10	11,680
58	W	February 19, 1984	4–3 OT	Washington Capitals (1983–84)	21–27–10	11,406
59	W	February 22, 1984	8–5	@ New Jersey Devils (1983–84)	22–27–10	8,889
60	W	February 23, 1984	5–3	@ Montreal Canadiens (1983–84)	23–27–10	15,525
61	W	February 25, 1984	5–2	Boston Bruins (1983–84)	24–27–10	14,489
62	L	February 27, 1984	5–6 OT	Edmonton Oilers (1983–84)	24–28–10	15,736
63	L	February 29, 1984	3–4	New York Islanders (1983–84)	24–29–10	13,874

March

Game	Result	Date	Score	Opponent	Record	Attendance
64	L	March 3, 1984	1–6	@ Detroit Red Wings (1983–84)	24–30–10	14,649
65	W	March 6, 1984	7–3	@ Los Angeles Kings (1983–84)	25–30–10	8,392
66	L	March 7, 1984	3–4	@ Vancouver Canucks (1983–84)	25–31–10	13,767
67	L	March 9, 1984	5–6 OT	New York Rangers (1983–84)	25–32–10	12,816
68	W	March 11, 1984	6–5 OT	Quebec Nordiques (1983–84)	26–32–10	13,172
69	W	March 12, 1984	8–7 OT	@ Toronto Maple Leafs (1983–84)	27–32–10	16,382
70	W	March 14, 1984	6–4	Chicago Black Hawks (1983–84)	28–32–10	11,638
71	W	March 16, 1984	5–4	Los Angeles Kings (1983–84)	29–32–10	11,975
72	L	March 18, 1984	3–4	Calgary Flames (1983–84)	29–33–10	14,874
73	L	March 20, 1984	3–9	@ St. Louis Blues (1983–84)	29–34–10	14,276
74	L	March 21, 1984	2–6	@ Chicago Black Hawks (1983–84)	29–35–10	16,133
75	L	March 23, 1984	3–4 OT	Vancouver Canucks (1983–84)	29–36–10	14,067
76	L	March 25, 1984	2–3	@ Edmonton Oilers (1983–84)	29–37–10	17,498
77	T	March 27, 1984	3–3 OT	@ Los Angeles Kings (1983–84)	29–37–11	7,367
78	L	March 28, 1984	1–5	@ Vancouver Canucks (1983–84)	29–38–11	13,200
79	W	March 30, 1984	2–1	St. Louis Blues (1983–84)	30–38–11	12,609

April

Game	Result	Date	Score	Opponent	Record	Attendance
80	W	April 1, 1984	3–2	Calgary Flames (1983–84)	31–38–11	11,410

Legend: Win (2 points) Loss (0 points) Tie (1 point)

== Playoffs ==
For the second year in a row, the Jets were swept in 3 games by the Edmonton Oilers, in the Division semi-finals.

== Player statistics ==
=== Regular season ===
Scoring

Player	Pos	GP	G	A	Pts	PIM	+/-	PPG	SHG	GWG
Dale Hawerchuk	C	80	37	65	102	73	-14	10	0	4
Lucien DeBlois	C	80	34	45	79	50	-15	8	1	2
Laurie Boschman	C	61	28	46	74	234	-4	9	0	3
Paul MacLean	RW	76	40	31	71	155	-15	13	0	5
Thomas Steen	C	78	20	45	65	69	-5	5	3	2
Brian Mullen	RW	75	21	41	62	28	-12	4	4	1
Dave Babych	D	66	18	39	57	62	-31	10	0	4
Scott Arniel	LW	80	21	35	56	68	-10	6	0	2
Morris Lukowich	LW	80	30	25	55	71	10	4	0	1
Moe Mantha	D	72	16	38	54	67	-14	3	0	1
Doug Smail	LW	66	20	17	37	62	-5	1	4	2
Tim Young	C	44	15	19	34	25	-11	3	0	0
Andrew McBain	RW	78	11	19	30	37	-6	0	0	0
Tim Watters	D	74	3	20	23	169	7	1	0	1
Robert Picard	D	62	6	16	22	34	9	1	1	1
Wade Campbell	D	79	7	14	21	147	-2	0	0	0
Bengt Lundholm	LW	57	5	14	19	20	-7	1	0	0
Ron Wilson	C	51	3	12	15	12	-3	0	0	1
Jordy Douglas	LW	17	4	2	6	8	-9	1	0	1
Don Spring	D	21	0	4	4	4	-5	0	0	0
Jim Kyte	D	58	1	2	3	55	-7	0	0	0
Randy Carlyle	D	5	0	3	3	2	4	0	0	0
Bryan Maxwell	D	3	0	3	3	27	1	0	0	0
Doug Soetaert	G	47	0	3	3	14	0	0	0	0
Jyrki Seppa	D	13	0	2	2	6	-9	0	0	0
Brian Hayward	G	28	0	1	1	2	0	0	0	0
Mike Lauen	RW	4	0	1	1	0	0	0	0	0
Jimmy Mann	RW	16	0	1	1	54	0	0	0	0
Ed Staniowski	G	1	0	1	1	0	0	0	0	0
Marc Behrend	G	6	0	0	0	0	0	0	0	0
Bobby Dollas	D	1	0	0	0	0	-2	0	0	0
Murray Eaves	C	2	0	0	0	0	0	0	0	0
John Gibson	D	11	0	0	0	14	2	0	0	0
Tim Trimper	LW	5	0	0	0	0	1	0	0	0
Mike Veisor	G	8	0	0	0	0	0	0	0	0

Goaltending

Player	MIN	GP	W	L	T	GA	GAA	SO
Doug Soetaert	2539	47	18	15	7	182	4.30	0
Brian Hayward	1530	28	7	18	2	124	4.86	0
Mike Veisor	420	8	4	1	2	26	3.71	0
Marc Behrend	351	6	2	4	0	32	5.47	0
Ed Staniowski	40	1	0	0	0	8	12.00	0
Team:	4880	80	31	38	11	372	4.57	0

=== Playoffs ===
Scoring

Player	Pos	GP	G	A	Pts	PIM	PPG	SHG	GWG
Brian Mullen	RW	3	0	3	3	6	0	0	0
Andrew McBain	RW	3	2	0	2	0	0	0	0
Dave Babych	D	3	1	1	2	0	1	0	0
Dale Hawerchuk	C	3	1	1	2	0	1	0	0
Randy Carlyle	D	3	0	2	2	4	0	0	0
Paul MacLean	RW	3	1	0	1	0	0	0	0
Moe Mantha	D	3	1	0	1	0	0	1	0
Tim Watters	D	3	1	0	1	2	0	0	0
Laurie Boschman	C	3	0	1	1	5	0	0	0
Lucien DeBlois	C	3	0	1	1	4	0	0	0
Doug Smail	LW	3	0	1	1	7	0	0	0
Thomas Steen	C	3	0	1	1	9	0	0	0
Tim Young	C	1	0	1	1	0	0	0	0
Scott Arniel	LW	2	0	0	0	5	0	0	0
Marc Behrend	G	2	0	0	0	0	0	0	0
Wade Campbell	D	3	0	0	0	7	0	0	0
Jordy Douglas	LW	1	0	0	0	2	0	0	0
Murray Eaves	C	2	0	0	0	2	0	0	0
Jim Kyte	D	3	0	0	0	11	0	0	0
Morris Lukowich	LW	3	0	0	0	0	0	0	0
Robert Picard	D	3	0	0	0	12	0	0	0
Doug Soetaert	G	1	0	0	0	0	0	0	0
Mike Veisor	G	1	0	0	0	0	0	0	0

Goaltending

Player	MIN	GP	W	L	GA	GAA	SO
Marc Behrend	121	2	0	2	9	4.46	0
Doug Soetaert	20	1	0	1	5	15.00	0
Mike Veisor	40	1	0	0	4	6.00	0
Team:	181	3	0	3	18	5.97	0

Note:

Pos = Position;GP = Games played; G = Goals; A = Assists; Pts = Points; PIM = Penalty minutes; +/- = Plus/minus; PPG = Power-play goals; SHG = Short-handed goals; GWG = Game-winning goals
Pos = Position;GP = Games played; Min, TOI = Minutes played; W = Wins; L = Losses; T,T/OT = Ties; OTL = Overtime losses; GA = Goals-against; GAA = Goals-against average; SO = Shutouts; SA = Shots against; SV = Shots saved;SV% = Save percentage;

== Transactions ==
=== Trades ===
August 3, 1983	To Minnesota North Stars Craig Levie; Tom Ward	To Winnipeg Jets Tim Young
April 28, 1983	To Montreal Canadiens Serge Savard	To Winnipeg Jets 3rd round pick in 1983 – Peter Taglianetti
November 4, 1983	To Montreal Canadiens 3rd round pick in 1984 – Patrick Roy	To Winnipeg Jets Robert Picard
November 10, 1983	To Hartford Whalers Ed Staniowski	To Winnipeg Jets Mike Veisor
January 12, 1984	To Minnesota North Stars Tim Trimper	To Winnipeg Jets Jordy Douglas
February 6, 1984	To Quebec Nordiques Jimmy Mann	To Winnipeg Jets 5th round pick in 1984 – Brent Severyn
March 5, 1984	To Pittsburgh Penguins 1st round pick in 1984 – Doug Bodger; Moe Mantha Jr.	To Winnipeg Jets Randy Carlyle
June 13, 1984	To Montreal Canadiens Lucien DeBlois	To Winnipeg Jets Perry Turnbull

=== Waivers ===
October 10, 1983	To Pittsburgh Penguins Bryan Maxwell

=== Free agents ===
Player	Former team
Kelly Elcombe	Undrafted Free Agent
Doug Gibson	Toronto Maple Leafs
Perry Pooley	Undrafted Free Agent

== Draft picks ==
Winnipeg selected the following players at the 1983 NHL entry draft, which was held at the Montreal Forum in Montreal on June 8, 1983.

=== NHL amateur draft ===
Round	Pick	Player	Nationality	College/Junior/Club team
1	8	Andrew McBain (RW)	Canada	North Bay Centennials (OHL)
1	14	Bobby Dollas (D)	Canada	Laval Voisins (QMJHL)
2	29	Brad Berry (D)	Canada	St. Albert Saints (AJHL)
3	43	Peter Taglianetti (D)	United States	Providence College (NCAA)
4	69	Bob Essensa (G)	Canada	Father Henry Carr Catholic Secondary School
5	89	Harry Armstrong (D)	United States	Dubuque Fighting Saints (USHL)
6	109	Joel Baillargeon (LW)	Canada	Hull Olympiques (QMJHL)
7	129	Iain Duncan (LW)	Canada	North York Rangers (OJHL)
8	149	Ron Pesetti (D)	United States	Western Michigan University (NCAA)
9	169	Todd Flichel (D)	Canada	Gloucester (OPJHL)
10	189	Kory Wright (FWD)	United States	Dubuque Fighting Saints (USHL)
11	209	Eric Cormier (LW)	Canada	St. George's (Que.) School
12	229	Jamie Husgen (D)	United States	Des Moines Buccaneers (USHL)

== Farm teams ==
Sherbrooke Jets

== See also ==
- 1983–84 NHL season
