= 1983–84 Calgary Flames season =

NHL team season

1983–84 Calgary Flames
- Division: 2nd Smythe
- Conference: 3rd Campbell
- 1983–84 record: 34–32–14
- Home record: 22–11–7
- Road record: 12–21–7
- Goals for: 311
- Goals against: 314

Team information
- General manager: Cliff Fletcher
- Coach: Bob Johnson
- Captain: Lanny McDonald and Doug Risebrough
- Alternate captains: None
- Arena: Olympic Saddledome
- Average attendance: 16,674

Team leaders
- Goals: Eddy Beers (36)
- Assists: Kent Nilsson (49)
- Points: Kent Nilsson (80)
- Penalty minutes: Paul Baxter (182)
- Wins: Rejean Lemelin (21)
- Goals against average: Rejean Lemelin (3.50)

The 1983–84 Calgary Flames season was the fourth season in Calgary and 12th for the Flames franchise in the National Hockey League (NHL). The Flames finished in second place in the Smythe Division, earning a first round playoff match-up against the Vancouver Canucks. Calgary defeated Vancouver in four games to face the top team in the NHL, the Edmonton Oilers. The Flames took the series to the maximum seven games, ultimately falling to the Oilers in the seventh game by a 7–4 score.

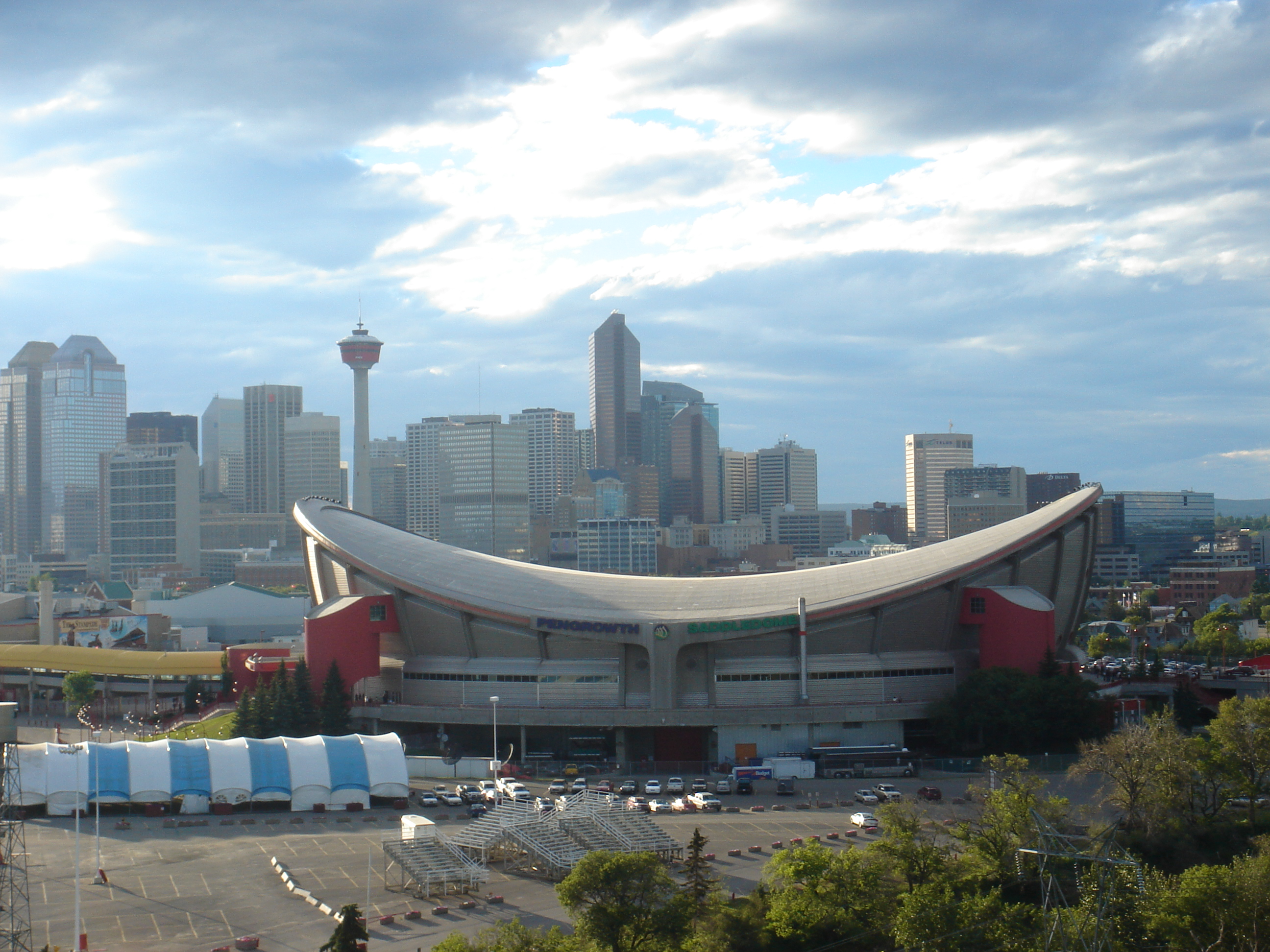
The Flames moved into the Olympic Saddledome in 1983.

The Flames moved into their new arena, the Olympic Saddledome after spending their first three seasons playing out of the Stampede Corral. Built at a cost of $100 million CAD, the Saddledome was also set to serve as a venue for the 1988 Winter Olympics. The arena's distinctive roof lent itself to the arena's name. The first game was played on October 15, 1983, against the Edmonton Oilers. The Oilers would win the game 4–3.

Also debuting for the Flames in 1983–84 was the team's mascot, Harvey the Hound. Harvey became the first mascot in the NHL when he debuted February 16, 1984. Harvey was also briefly the mascot of the Calgary Stampeders of the Canadian Football League, but would later be replaced by the Stamps with their own mascot, Ralph the Dog.

Lanny McDonald was the Flames lone representative at the 1984 All-Star Game, while both Hakan Loob and Jamie Macoun were named to the NHL's All-Rookie team.

== Regular season ==
=== Season standings ===
Smythe Division
	GP	W	L	T	GF	GA	Pts
**Edmonton Oilers**	80	57	18	5	446	314	119
**Calgary Flames**	80	34	32	14	311	314	82
**Vancouver Canucks**	80	32	39	9	306	328	73
**Winnipeg Jets**	80	31	38	11	340	374	73
Los Angeles Kings	80	23	44	13	309	376	59

Note: GP = Games played, W = Wins, L = Losses, T = Ties, Pts = Points, GF = Goals for, GA = Goals against
Note: Teams that qualified for the playoffs are highlighted in bold.

=== Record vs. opponents ===
Smythe Division record vs. opponents

==== Vs. Campbell Conference ====
**Vs. Smythe Division**

1983–84 NHL records
Team	**CGY**	**EDM**	**LAK**	**VAN**	**WIN**	**Total**
Calgary	—	0−7−1	4−3−1	5−2−1	4−1−3	**13−13−6**
Edmonton	7−0−1	—	6−2	6−1−1	8−0	**27−3−2**
Los Angeles	3−4−1	2−6	—	4−3−1	0−5−3	**9−18−5**
Vancouver	2−5−1	1−6−1	3−4−1	—	5−2−1	**11−17−4**
Winnipeg	1−4−3	0−8	5−0−3	2−5−1	—	**8−17−7**

**Vs. Norris Division**

1983–84 NHL records
Team	**CHI**	**DET**	**MIN**	**STL**	**TOR**	**Total**
Calgary	2−1	1−2	2−1	2−0−1	1−0−2	**8−4−3**
Edmonton	2−1	3−0	2−0−1	1−2	2−1	**10−4−1**
Los Angeles	3−0	2−0−1	1−1−1	1−1−1	0−2−1	**7−4−4**
Vancouver	1−2	2−1	1−1−1	1−2	1−0−2	**6−6−3**
Winnipeg	2−1	0−1−2	1−2	2−1	3−0	**8−5−2**

**Vs. Wales Conference**

**Vs. Adams Division**

1983–84 NHL records
Team	**BOS**	**BUF**	**HFD**	**MTL**	**QUE**	**Total**
Calgary	0−2−1	0−3	2−0−1	1−2	1−2	**4−9−2**
Edmonton	2−1	2−1	2−1	2−1	3−0	**11−4−0**
Los Angeles	0−3	0−2−1	1−2	2−1	0−3	**3−11−1**
Vancouver	0−2−1	0−3	3−0	2−1	2−1	**7−7−1**
Winnipeg	1−2	0−3	2−0−1	1−1−1	2−1	**6−7−2**

**Vs. Patrick Division**

1983–84 NHL records
Team	**NJD**	**NYI**	**NYR**	**PHI**	**PIT**	**WSH**	**Total**
Calgary	2−0−1	3−0	1−2	1−2	1−0−2	1−2	**9−6−3**
Edmonton	2−0−1	0−3	2−1	0−2−1	3−0	2−1	**9−7−2**
Los Angeles	1−2	0−2−1	0−1−2	1−2	2−1	0−3	**4−11−3**
Vancouver	2−1	0−3	1−1–1	2−1	2−1	1−2	**8−9−1**
Winnipeg	2−1	2−1	1−2	1−2	2−1	1−2	**9−9−0**

== Schedule and results ==
1983–84 regular season
October: 5–6–1 (home: 3–1–0; road: 2–5–1)

Game	Date	Visitor	Score	Home	OT	Record	Pts
1	October 5	Calgary	5 – 3	Vancouver		1–0–0	2
2	October 9	Calgary	1 – 1	Winnipeg	OT	1–0–1	3
3	October 12	Calgary	5 – 7	Minnesota		1–1–1	3
4	October 15	Edmonton	4 – 3	Calgary		1–2–1	3
5	October 16	Calgary	1 – 5	Edmonton		1–3–1	3
6	October 18	Calgary	4 – 3	NY Islanders		2–3–1	5
7	October 19	Calgary	1 – 3	NY Rangers		2–4–1	5
8	October 22	Calgary	1 – 4	Detroit		2–5–1	5
9	October 23	Calgary	4 – 7	Chicago		2–6–1	5
10	October 26	St. Louis	4 – 5	Calgary		3–6–1	7
11	October 28	Winnipeg	1 – 7	Calgary		4–6–1	9
12	October 30	Vancouver	3 – 4	Calgary	OT	5–6–1	11

November: 5–4–3 (home: 3–2–2; road: 2–2–1)

Game	Date	Visitor	Score	Home	OT	Record	Pts
13	November 3	Pittsburgh	3 – 3	Calgary	OT	5–6–2	12
14	November 5	Toronto	3 – 5	Calgary		6–6–2	14
15	November 8	Calgary	4 – 4	Pittsburgh	OT	6–6–3	15
16	November 9	Calgary	3 – 4	NY Rangers		6–7–3	15
17	November 12	Calgary	4 – 3	New Jersey	OT	7–7–3	17
18	November 13	Calgary	2 – 11	Buffalo		7–8–3	17
19	November 17	New Jersey	4 – 5	Calgary		8–8–3	19
20	November 19	Buffalo	5 – 2	Calgary		8–9–3	19
21	November 21	Los Angeles	4 – 7	Calgary		9–9–3	21
22	November 24	Winnipeg	4 – 4	Calgary	OT	9–9–4	22
23	November 26	Calgary	4 – 1	Los Angeles		10–9–4	24
24	November 29	Philadelphia	8 – 5	Calgary		10–10–4	24

December: 4–7–2 (home: 4–2–0; road: 0–5–2)

Game	Date	Visitor	Score	Home	OT	Record	Pts
25	December 1	NY Islanders	2 – 6	Calgary		11–10–4	26
26	December 3	Calgary	2 – 4	Montreal		11–11–4	26
27	December 6	Calgary	1 – 8	Quebec		11–12–4	26
28	December 8	Calgary	3 – 4	Washington		11–13–4	26
29	December 10	Calgary	3 – 3	Toronto	OT	11–13–5	27
30	December 14	Quebec	2 – 4	Calgary		12–13–5	29
31	December 16	Calgary	3 – 5	Vancouver		12–14–5	29
32	December 19	Winnipeg	6 – 7	Calgary		13–14–5	31
33	December 21	Calgary	4 – 7	Los Angeles		13–15–5	31
34	December 23	Calgary	5 – 5	Edmonton	OT	13–15–6	32
35	December 26	Edmonton	6 – 3	Calgary		13–16–6	32
36	December 28	Boston	5 – 3	Calgary		13–17–6	32
37	December 30	Vancouver	1 – 5	Calgary		14–17–6	34

January: 5–2–5 (home: 3–1–3; road: 2–1–2)

Game	Date	Visitor	Score	Home	OT	Record	Pts
38	January 1	Calgary	3 – 3	Winnipeg	OT	14–17–7	35
39	January 3	Edmonton	9 – 6	Calgary		14–18–7	35
40	January 5	Minnesota	4 – 5	Calgary		15–18–7	37
41	January 7	Calgary	1 – 7	Los Angeles		15–19–7	37
42	January 11	Winnipeg	5 – 9	Calgary		16–19–7	39
43	January 13	Hartford	3 – 3	Calgary	OT	16–19–8	40
44	January 15	Washington	2 – 3	Calgary		17–19–8	42
45	January 17	Calgary	2 – 2	St. Louis	OT	17–19–9	43
46	January 18	Calgary	4 – 2	Detroit		18–19–9	45
47	January 21	Calgary	3 – 2	Montreal		19–19–9	47
48	January 25	New Jersey	2 – 2	Calgary	OT	19–19–10	48
49	January 27	Los Angeles	2 – 2	Calgary	OT	19–19–11	49

February: 9–4–2 (home: 5–0–2; road: 4–4–0)

Game	Date	Visitor	Score	Home	OT	Record	Pts
50	February 2	NY Rangers	1 – 8	Calgary		20–19–11	51
51	February 3	Calgary	5 – 10	Edmonton		20–20–11	51
52	February 5	Vancouver	2 – 4	Calgary		21–20–11	53
53	February 7	Calgary	2 – 1	St. Louis		22–20–11	55
54	February 8	Calgary	1 – 6	Washington		22–21–11	55
55	February 11	Calgary	6 – 3	Hartford		23–21–11	57
56	February 12	Calgary	6 – 4	Chicago		24–21–11	59
57	February 16	Pittsburgh	3 – 10	Calgary		25–21–11	61
58	February 18	Boston	5 – 5	Calgary	OT	25–21–12	62
59	February 19	Calgary	2 – 5	Vancouver		25–22–12	62
60	February 21	Toronto	2 – 2	Calgary	OT	25–22–13	63
61	February 23	Vancouver	2 – 3	Calgary	OT	26–22–13	65
62	February 24	Calgary	3 – 5	Edmonton		26–23–13	65
63	February 26	Calgary	5 – 2	Los Angeles		27–23–13	67
64	February 28	Los Angeles	1 – 9	Calgary		28–23–13	69

March: 6–8–1 (home: 4–4–0; road: 2–4–1)

Game	Date	Visitor	Score	Home	OT	Record	Pts
65	March 1	Philadelphia	1 – 5	Calgary		29–23–13	71
66	March 3	Montreal	3 – 1	Calgary		29–24–13	71
67	March 6	Calgary	3 – 4	Quebec		29–25–13	71
68	March 8	Calgary	2 – 3	Boston		29–26–13	71
69	March 10	Calgary	5 – 4	NY Islanders	OT	30–26–13	73
70	March 11	Calgary	2 – 3	Philadelphia		30–27–13	73
71	March 14	Calgary	2 – 4	Buffalo		30–28–13	73
72	March 16	Chicago	5 – 6	Calgary		31–28–13	75
73	March 18	Calgary	4 – 3	Winnipeg		32–28–13	77
74	March 20	Hartford	1 – 4	Calgary		33–28–13	79
75	March 22	Detroit	6 – 4	Calgary		33–29–13	79
76	March 25	Calgary	4 – 4	Vancouver	OT	33–29–14	80
77	March 27	Edmonton	9 – 2	Calgary		33–30–14	80
78	March 29	Los Angeles	6 – 3	Calgary		33–31–14	80
79	March 31	Minnesota	3 – 10	Calgary		34–31–14	82

April: 0–1–0 (home: 0–0–0; road: 0–1–0)

Game	Date	Visitor	Score	Home	OT	Record	Pts
80	April 1	Calgary	2 – 3	Winnipeg		34–32–14	82

Legend: Win (2 points) Loss (0 points) Tie (1 point)

== Playoffs ==
1984 Stanley Cup playoffs
Smythe Division Semifinals vs. Vancouver Canucks – Flames win 3–1

Game	Date	Visitor	Score	Home	OT	Series
1	April 4	Vancouver	3 – 5	Calgary		Calgary leads 1–0
2	April 5	Vancouver	2 – 4	Calgary		Calgary leads 2–0
3	April 7	Calgary	0 – 7	Vancouver		Calgary leads 2–1
4	April 8	Calgary	5 – 1	Vancouver		Calgary wins 3–1

Smythe Division Finals vs. Edmonton Oilers – Oilers win 4–3

Game	Date	Visitor	Score	Home	OT	Series
1	April 12	Calgary	2 – 5	Edmonton		Edmonton leads 1–0
2	April 13	Calgary	6 – 5	Edmonton	OT	Series tied 1–1
3	April 15	Edmonton	3 – 2	Calgary		Edmonton leads 2–1
4	April 16	Edmonton	5 – 3	Calgary		Edmonton leads 3–1
5	April 18	Calgary	5 – 4	Edmonton		Edmonton leads 3–2
6	April 20	Edmonton	4 – 5	Calgary	OT	Series tied 3–3
7	April 22	Calgary	4 – 7	Edmonton		Edmonton wins 4–3

Legend: Win Loss

== Player statistics ==
=== Skaters ===
Note: GP = Games played; G = Goals; A = Assists; Pts = Points; PIM = Penalty minutes

		Regular season					Playoffs
Player	#	GP	G	A	Pts	PIM	GP	G	A	Pts	PIM
Kent Nilsson	14	67	31	49	80	22	–	–	–	–	-
Eddy Beers	27	73	36	39	75	88	11	2	5	7	12
Lanny McDonald	9	65	33	33	66	64	11	6	7	13	6
Hakan Loob	12	77	30	25	55	22	11	2	3	5	2
Dan Quinn	10	54	19	33	52	20	8	3	5	8	4
Doug Risebrough	8	77	23	28	51	161	11	2	1	3	25
Mike Eaves	7	61	14	36	50	20	11	4	4	8	2
Al MacInnis	2	51	11	34	45	42	11	2	12	14	13
Kari Eloranta	20	78	5	34	39	44	6	0	2	2	2
Jim Peplinski	24	74	11	22	33	114	11	3	4	7	21
Jamie Macoun	34	72	9	23	32	97	11	1	0	1	0
Colin Patterson	11	56	13	14	27	15	11	1	1	2	6
Paul Baxter	4	74	7	20	27	182	11	0	2	2	37
Steve Tambellini	15	73	15	10	25	16	2	0	1	1	0
Richard Kromm	22	53	11	12	23	27	11	1	1	2	9
Paul Reinhart	23	27	6	15	21	10	11	6	11	17	2
Steve Bozek	26	46	10	10	20	16	10	3	1	4	15
Jim Jackson	16	49	6	14	20	13	6	1	1	2	4
Steve Konroyd	3	80	1	13	14	94	8	1	2	3	8
Dave Hindmarch	18	29	6	5	11	2	–	–	–	–	-
Tony Stiles	21	30	2	7	9	20	–	–	–	–	-
Jamie Hislop	17	27	1	8	9	2	–	–	–	–	-
Tim Hunter	19	43	4	4	8	130	7	0	0	0	21
Carey Wilson	33	15	2	5	&	2	6	3	1	4	2
Mickey Volcan	5	19	1	4	5	18	–	–	–	–	-
Charlie Bourgeois	28	17	1	3	4	35	8	0	1	1	27
Bruce Eakin	25	7	2	1	3	4	–	–	–	–	-
Kari Jalonen	21	9	0	3	3	0	–	–	–	–	-
Rejean Lemelin	31	51	0	3	3	6	8	0	0	0	0
Keith Hanson	6	25	0	2	2	77	–	–	–	–	-
Don Edwards	1	41	0	2	2	2	6	0	0	0	0
Neil Sheehy	5	2	2	0	2	3	4	0	0	0	4
Dan Bolduc	32	2	0	1	1	0	1	0	0	0	0
Mike Vernon	30	1	0	0	0	0	–	–	–	–	-
Jeff Brubaker	29	4	0	0	0	19	–	–	–	–	-

^{†}Denotes player spent time with another team before joining Calgary. Stats reflect time with the Flames only.
^{‡}Traded mid-season.

=== Goaltenders ===
Note: GP = Games played; TOI = Time on ice (minutes); W = Wins; L = Losses; OT = Overtime/shootout losses; GA = Goals against; SO = Shutouts; GAA = Goals against average

		Regular season								Playoffs
Player	#	GP	TOI	W	L	T	GA	SO	GAA	GP	TOI	W	L	GA	SO	GAA
Rejean Lemelin	31	51	2568	21	12	9	150	0	3.50	8	448	2	1	32	0	4.29
Don Edwards	1	41	2303	13	19	5	157	0	4.09	6	217	4	4	23	0	3.32
Mike Vernon	30	1	11	0	1	0	4	0	21.82	–	–	–	–	–	–	-.--

== Transactions ==
The Flames were involved in the following transactions during the 1983–84 season.

=== Trades ===
June 8, 1983	To Calgary Flames Mike Eaves; Keith Hanson	To Minnesota North Stars Steve Christoff; Montreal Canadiens' 2nd round pick in 1983 entry draft (Frank Musil)
June 20, 1983	To Calgary Flames Steve Bozek	To Los Angeles Kings Kevin LaVallee; Carl Mokosak
June 21, 1983	To Calgary Flames Steve Tambellini; Joel Quenneville	To New Jersey Devils Mel Bridgman; Phil Russell
July 5, 1983	To Calgary Flames Mickey Volcan	To Hartford Whalers Richie Dunn; Joel Quenneville
September 6, 1983	To Calgary Flames Future Considerations	To St. Louis Blues Guy Chouinard

=== Free agents ===
Player	Former team
D Neil Sheehy	Harvard University (NCAA)
D Paul Baxter	Pittsburgh Penguins

Player	New team
RW Tim Harrer	Minnesota North Stars
C Kari Jalonen	Edmonton Oilers

=== Waivers ===
Player	Former team
LW Jeff Brubaker	Quebec Nordiques

== Draft picks ==
Calgary's picks at the 1983 NHL entry draft, held in Montreal.

Rnd	Pick	Player	Nationality	Position	Team (league)	NHL statistics				
Rnd	Pick	Player	Nationality	Position	Team (league)	GP	G	A	Pts	PIM
1	13	Dan Quinn	Canada	C	Belleville Bulls (OHL)	805	266	419	685	533
3	51	Brian Bradley	Canada	C	London Knights (OHL)	651	182	321	503	528
3	55	Perry Berezan	Canada	C	St. Albert Saints (AJHL)	378	61	75	136	277
4	66	John Bekkers	Canada	F	Regina Pats (WHL)					
4	71	Kevan Guy	Canada	D	Medicine Hat Tigers (WHL)	156	5	20	25	138
4	77	Bill Claviter	United States	LW	N/A					
5	91	Igor Liba	Czechoslovakia	LW	N/A	37	7	18	25	36
6	111	Grant Blair	Canada	G	Harvard (ECAC Hockey)					
7	131	Jeff Hogg	Canada	G	Oshawa Generals (OHL)					
8	151	Chris MacDonald	Canada	D	Western Michigan (CCHA)					
9	171	Rob Kivell	Canada	D	Victoria Cougars (WHL)					
10	191	Tom Pratt	United States	D	N/A					
11	211	Jaroslav Benak	Czechoslovakia	D	N/A					
12	231	Sergei Makarov	Soviet Union	RW	HC CSKA Moscow (USSR)	424	134	250	384	317

== See also ==
- 1983–84 NHL season
