= 1983–84 NHL transactions =

The following is a list of all team-to-team transactions that have occurred in the National Hockey League during the 1983–84 NHL season. It lists what team each player has been traded to, signed by, or claimed by, and for which player(s) or draft pick(s), if applicable.

== Trades between teams ==
=== June ===
June 8, 1983	To Buffalo Sabres Real Cloutier; 1st-rd pick - 1983 entry draft (# 11 - Adam Creighton)	To Quebec Nordiques Tony McKegney; Jean-Francois Sauve; Andre Savard; 3rd-rd pick - 1983 entry draft (# 54 - Iiro Jarvi)
June 8, 1983	To Washington Capitals Dave Christian	To Winnipeg Jets 1st-rd pick - 1983 entry draft (# 14 - Bobby Dollas)
June 8, 1983	To Minnesota North Stars Steve Christoff; 2nd-rd pick - 1983 entry draft^{1} (# 38 - Frank Musil)	To Calgary Flames Mike Eaves; Keith Hanson
June 8, 1983	To Los Angeles Kings 4th-rd pick - 1984 entry draft (NYI - # 70 - Doug Wieck)^{2}	To Detroit Red Wings 4th-rd pick - 1983 entry draft (# 68 - Dave Korol)
June 8, 1983	To Quebec Nordiques 12th-rd pick - 1983 entry draft (# 239 - Jindrich Kokrment)	To Chicago Black Hawks 11th-rd pick - 1984 entry draft (# 224 - David Mackey)
June 8, 1983	To Chicago Black Hawks Behn Wilson	To Philadelphia Flyers Doug Crossman; 2nd-rd pick - 1983 entry draft (# 27 - Scott Mellanby)
June 13, 1983	To Detroit Red Wings Ron Duguay; Eddie Johnstone; Eddie Mio	To New York Rangers Mike Blaisdell; Willie Huber; Mark Osborne
June 20, 1983	To Los Angeles Kings Kevin LaVallee; Carl Mokosak	To Calgary Flames Steve Bozek
June 20, 1983	To New Jersey Devils Mel Bridgman; Phil Russell	To Calgary Flames Joel Quenneville; Steve Tambellini
June 29, 1983	To Minnesota North Stars Jay Miller	To Quebec Nordiques Jim Dobson

1. Minnesota had the option of the 2nd-rd pick in 1983 or 1984 NHL Entry Draft. They selected in the 1983 draft.
2. Los Angeles' fourth-round pick went to Minnesota as the result of a trade on November 17, 1983 that sent Mike McEwen to Los Angeles in exchange for this pick.

=== July ===
July 4, 1983	To Hartford Whalers Norm Dupont	To Winnipeg Jets 4th-rd pick - 1984 entry draft (# 68 - Chris Mills)
July 5, 1983	To Hartford Whalers Richie Dunn; Joel Quenneville	To Calgary Flames Mickey Volcan
July 5, 1983	To Minnesota North Stars Dennis Maruk	To Washington Capitals 2nd-rd pick - 1984 entry draft (# 34 - Steve Leach)

=== August ===
August 3, 1983	To Minnesota North Stars Craig Levie rights to Tom Ward	To Winnipeg Jets Tim Young
August 12, 1983	To Toronto Maple Leafs Basil McRae	To Quebec Nordiques Richard Turmel
August 15, 1983	To Toronto Maple Leafs Pat Graham; Nick Ricci	To Pittsburgh Penguins Rocky Saganiuk; Vincent Tremblay
August 19, 1983	To Hartford Whalers Steve Stoyanovich	To New York Islanders 5th-rd pick in 1985 entry draft (# 89 - Tommy Hedlund)

=== September ===
September 6, 1983	To Calgary Flames future considerations	To St. Louis Blues Guy Chouinard
September 9, 1983	To Los Angeles Kings Anders Hakansson	To Pittsburgh Penguins rights to Kevin Stevens
September 29, 1983	To Hartford Whalers Marty Howe	To Boston Bruins future considerations
September 30, 1983	To Hartford Whalers Greg Malone	To Pittsburgh Penguins 3rd-rd pick - 1985 entry draft (# 58 - Bruce Racine)

=== October ===
October 3, 1983	To Hartford Whalers Torrie Robertson	To Washington Capitals Greg Adams
October 3, 1983	To Minnesota North Stars Dave Lewis	To Los Angeles Kings Fred Barrett; Steve Christoff
October 3, 1983	To New Jersey Devils Dave Lewis	To Minnesota North Stars Brent Ashton
October 5, 1983	To Boston Bruins David Silk	To New York Rangers Dave Barr
October 6, 1983	To Toronto Maple Leafs Lee Norwood	To Washington Capitals Dave Shand
October 15, 1983	To Los Angeles Kings Marc Chorney	To Pittsburgh Penguins 6th-rd pick - 1985 entry draft (# 114 - Stuart-Lee Marston)
October 18, 1983	To Los Angeles Kings Brian Engblom; Ken Houston	To Washington Capitals Larry Murphy
October 20, 1983	To Minnesota North Stars Lars Lindgren	To Vancouver Canucks 3rd-rd pick - 1984 entry draft (# 55 - Landis Chaulk)
October 23, 1983	To Pittsburgh Penguins Andy Brickley; Ron Flockhart; Mark Taylor; 1st-rd pick - 1984 entry draft (# 16 - Roger Belanger); 3rd-rd pick - 1984 entry draft (VAN - # 58 - Mike Stevens)^{1}	To Philadelphia Flyers Rich Sutter; 2nd-rd pick - 1984 entry draft (# 22 - Greg Smyth); 3rd-rd pick - 1984 entry draft (# 43 - David McLay)
October 24, 1983	To Detroit Red Wings Andre St. Laurent	To Pittsburgh Penguins future considerations
October 28, 1983	To Montreal Canadiens Bobby Smith	To Minnesota North Stars Keith Acton; Mark Napier; 3rd-rd pick - 1984 entry draft (# 46 - Ken Hodge, Jr.)

1. The Pittsburgh's third-round pick went to Vancouver as the result of a trade on January 26, 1984 that sent the Kevin McCarthy to Pittsburgh in exchange for this pick.

=== November ===
November 4, 1983	To Montreal Canadiens 3rd-rd pick - 1984 entry draft (# 51 - Patrick Roy)	To Winnipeg Jets Robert Picard
November 10, 1983	To Hartford Whalers Ed Staniowski	To Winnipeg Jets Mike Veisor
November 17, 1983	To Los Angeles Kings Mike McEwen	To New York Islanders 4th-rd pick - 1984 entry draft (# 70 - Doug Wieck)

=== December ===
December 5, 1983	To Edmonton Oilers Kevin McClelland; 6th-rd pick - 1984 entry draft (# 106 - Emanuel Viveiros)	To Pittsburgh Penguins Tom Roulston
December 6, 1983	To Chicago Black Hawks Randy Boyd	To Pittsburgh Penguins Greg Fox
December 20, 1983	To Montreal Canadiens Dan Bonar	To Los Angeles Kings cash
December 21, 1983	To Montreal Canadiens Perry Turnbull	To St. Louis Blues Gilbert Delorme; Greg Paslawski; Doug Wickenheiser

=== January ===
January 3, 1984	To Boston Bruins Bob LaForest	To Los Angeles Kings Marco Baron
January 5, 1984	To St. Louis Blues Michel Larocque	To Philadelphia cash
January 8, 1984	To Detroit Red Wings Rick MacLeish	To Philadelphia Flyers future considerations
January 11, 1984	To New Jersey Devils Tim Higgins	To Chicago Black Hawks Jeff Larmer
January 12, 1984	To Minnesota North Stars Tim Trimper	To Winnipeg Jets Jordy Douglas
January 20, 1984	To Edmonton Oilers Rick Chartraw	To New York Rangers 9th-rd pick - 1984 entry draft (# 188 - Heinz Ehlers)
January 26, 1984	To Vancouver Canucks 3rd-rd pick - 1984 entry draft (# 58 - Mike Stevens)	To Pittsburgh Penguins Kevin McCarthy

=== February ===
February 3, 1984	To Boston Bruins Jim Nill	To Vancouver Canucks Peter McNab
February 6, 1984	To Quebec Nordiques Jimmy Mann	To Winnipeg Jets 5th-rd pick - 1984 entry draft (# 99 - Brent Severyn)
February 10, 1984	To Quebec Nordiques Andre Dore	To St. Louis Blues Dave Pichette
February 15, 1984	To Toronto Maple Leafs cash	To Los Angeles Kings Billy Harris
February 23, 1984	To Minnesota North Stars Paul Holmgren	To Philadelphia Flyers rights to Paul Guay; 3rd-rd pick - 1985 entry draft (# 48 - Darryl Gilmour)
February 27, 1984	To Hartford Whalers Scot Kleinendorst	To New York Rangers Blaine Stoughton
February 29, 1984	To Quebec Nordiques cash	To Detroit Red Wings Pierre Aubry

=== March ===
- Trading Deadline: March 6, 1984

March 5, 1984	To St. Louis Blues Dave Barr; 3rd-rd pick - 1984 entry draft (# 55 - Alan Perry) cash	To New York Rangers Larry Patey rights to Bob Brooke
March 5, 1984	To Winnipeg Jets Randy Carlyle	To Pittsburgh Penguins 1st-rd pick - 1984 entry draft (# 9 - Doug Bodger) future considerations^{1} (Moe Mantha Jr.)
March 6, 1984	To Boston Bruins John Blum	To Edmonton Oilers Larry Melnyk
March 6, 1984	To Edmonton Oilers rights to Risto Jalo	To Washington Capitals 4th-rd pick - 1985 entry draft (# 83 - Larry Shaw)

1. Trade completed on May 1, 1984.

== Additional sources ==
- hockeydb.com - search for player and select "show trades"
- "NHL trades for 1983-1984". NHL Trade Tracker.
