= Roger Grillo =

American ice hockey player and coach (born 1964)

Current position
- Title: Regional manager
- Team: USA Hockey

Biographical details
- Born: February 1, 1964; Apple Valley, MN, USA

Playing career
- 1982–1985: Maine
- Position: Defenseman

Coaching career (HC unless noted)
- 1989–1990: Norwich (assistant)
- 1990–1997: Vermont (assistant)
- 1997–2009: Brown
- 2009–present: USA Hockey (regional manager)

Head coaching record
- Overall: 120-205-52 (.387)

Roger Grillo is a former American ice hockey player and coach who is currently a regional manager for USA Hockey. A 10th round pick of the Vancouver Canucks in 1983, Grillo played for Maine for three seasons before starting a coaching career. After stints with Norwich and Vermont as an assistant Grillo became the head coach at Brown in 1997. Over twelve seasons Grillo had a moderate amount of success, producing three winning seasons, before accepting an offer from USA Hockey to become Regional Manager, American Development Model, a job he currently occupies.

== Head coaching record ==
Record table
Season	Team	Overall	Conference	Standing	Postseason
Brown Bears (ECAC Hockey) (1997–2009)
1997-98	Brown	13-16-2	11-9-2	4th	ECAC first round
1998-99	Brown	9-16-6	5-12-5	10th	ECAC first round
1999-00	Brown	6-19-3	4-15-2	11th	
2000-01	Brown	4-21-4	2-16-4	12th	
2001-02	Brown	14-15-2	10-10-2	t-6th	ECAC first round
2002-03	Brown	16-14-5	10-8-4	5th	ECAC third-place game (loss)
2003-04	Brown	15-11-5	13-7-2	3rd	ECAC Quarterfinals
2004-05	Brown	16-14-3	9-11-2	6th	ECAC Quarterfinals
2005-06	Brown	5-20-7	3-14-5	12th	ECAC first round
2006-07	Brown	11-15-6	6-12-4	11th	ECAC first round
2007-08	Brown	6-21-4	6-13-3	t-10th	ECAC first round
2008-09	Brown	5-23-5	3-15-4	12th	ECAC Quarterfinals
Brown:		120-205-52	82-142-39		
Total:		120-205-52			
National champion Postseason invitational champion Conference regular season champion Conference regular season and conference tournament champion Division regular season champion Division regular season and conference tournament champion Conference tournament champion
