= Sean Toomey =

American ice hockey player (born 1965)

- Born: June 27, 1965 (age 61) Saint Paul, Minnesota, U.S.
- Height: 6 ft 0 in (183 cm)
- Weight: 240 lb (109 kg; 17 st 2 lb)
- Position: Center
- Shot: Left
- Played for: Minnesota North Stars1 game 6 min
- NHL draft: 136th overall, 1983; Minnesota North Stars
- Playing career: 1987–1991

Sean Justin Toomey (born June 27, 1965) is an American former professional ice hockey center. He was drafted in the seventh round, 136th overall by the Minnesota North Stars in the 1983 NHL entry draft. He played one National Hockey League game with the North Stars in the 1986–87 season, on March 7, 1987 against the Pittsburgh Penguins, going scoreless. Toomey later played three seasons in Europe, retiring in 1991.

== Career statistics ==
=== Regular season and playoffs ===
			Regular season					Playoffs
Season	Team	League	GP	G	A	Pts	PIM	GP	G	A	Pts	PIM
1979–80	Cretin-Derham Hall High School	HS-MN	—	—	—	—	—	—	—	—	—	—
1980–81	Cretin-Derham Hall High School	HS-MN	—	—	—	—	—	—	—	—	—	—
1981–82	Cretin-Derham Hall High School	HS-MN	—	—	—	—	—	—	—	—	—	—
1982–83	Cretin-Derham Hall High School	HS-MN	23	48	32	80	—	—	—	—	—	—
1983–84	University of Minnesota-Duluth	WCHA	29	3	5	8	8	—	—	—	—	—
1984–85	University of Minnesota-Duluth	WCHA	43	6	7	13	14	—	—	—	—	—
1985–86	University of Minnesota-Duluth	WCHA	33	23	11	34	10	—	—	—	—	—
1986–87	University of Minnesota-Duluth	WCHA	39	26	17	43	34	—	—	—	—	—
1986–87	Minnesota North Stars	NHL	1	0	0	0	0	—	—	—	—	—
1986–87	Indianapolis Checkers	IHL	13	3	3	6	0	5	2	2	4	2
1987–88	Baltimore Skipjacks	AHL	49	15	18	33	12	—	—	—	—	—
1987–88	Kalamazoo Wings	IHL	23	12	5	17	2	4	1	3	4	0
1988–89	Ässät	FIN	34	14	13	27	18	—	—	—	—	—
1989–90	Nybro IF	SWE-2	32	15	21	36	39	—	—	—	—	—
1990–91	Nybro IF	SWE-3	32	24	17	41	18	—	—	—	—	—
NHL totals			1	0	0	0	0	—	—	—	—	—

== See also ==
- List of players who played only one game in the NHL
