= Richard Hajdu =

Canadian ice hockey player

- Born: April 10, 1965 (age 61) Duncan, British Columbia, Canada
- Height: 6 ft 0 in (183 cm)
- Weight: 170 lb (77 kg; 12 st 2 lb)
- Position: Right Wing
- Shot: Left
- Played for: Buffalo Sabres
- National team: Canada
- NHL draft: 34th overall, 1983; Buffalo Sabres
- Playing career: 1985–1993

Richard Hajdu (born April 10, 1965) is a Canadian former professional ice hockey right wing. He was drafted in the second round, 34th overall, by the Buffalo Sabres in the 1983 NHL entry draft.

Hajdu played five games in the National Hockey League, all with the Sabres.

== Post-playing career ==
Born in Duncan, British Columbia, Hajdu currently works as a real estate agent in Duncan, and coaches a minor league hockey team there.

== Career statistics ==
			Regular season					Playoffs
Season	Team	League	GP	G	A	Pts	PIM	GP	G	A	Pts	PIM
1981–82	Kamloops Junior Oilers	WHL	64	19	21	40	50	4	0	0	0	0
1982–83	Kamloops Junior Oilers	WHL	70	22	36	58	101	5	0	0	0	4
1983–84	Victoria Cougars	WHL	42	17	10	27	106	—	—	—	—	—
1984–85	Victoria Cougars	WHL	24	12	16	28	33	—	—	—	—	—
1984–85	Rochester Americans	AHL	2	0	2	2	0	—	—	—	—	—
1985–86	Rochester Americans	AHL	54	10	27	37	95	—	—	—	—	—
1985–86	Buffalo Sabres	NHL	3	0	0	0	4	—	—	—	—	—
1986–87	Rochester Americans	AHL	58	7	15	22	90	11	1	1	2	9
1986–87	Buffalo Sabres	NHL	2	0	0	0	0	—	—	—	—	—
1987–88	Rochester Americans	AHL	37	7	11	18	24	1	0	0	0	0
1987–88	Flint Spirits	IHL	17	4	6	10	30	—	—	—	—	—
1989–90	EHC Lustenau	Austria	20	17	11	28	29	—	—	—	—	—
1990–91	Innsbrucker EV	Austria	19	10	7	17	46	—	—	—	—	—
1991–92	Ritten Sport	Italy2	24	19	24	43	14	—	—	—	—	—
1992–93	Dallas Freeze	CHL	21	10	14	24	57	—	—	—	—	—
NHL totals			5	0	0	0	4	—	—	—	—	—
AHL totals			151	24	55	79	209	12	1	1	2	9
