= Steven Woodburn =

French ice hockey player

- Born: 24 October 1963 (age 62) Montreal, Quebec, Canada
- Height: 6 ft 1 in (185 cm)
- Weight: 194 lb (88 kg; 13 st 12 lb)
- Position: Defence
- Shot: Left
- Played for: Dragons de Rouen
- National team: France
- NHL draft: 240th overall, 1983; Edmonton Oilers
- Playing career: 1986–2001

Steven Woodburn (born 24 October 1963) is a French ice hockey player. He competed in the men's tournaments at the 1988 Winter Olympics and the 1994 Winter Olympics.
