= Shawn Evans (ice hockey) =

Canadian ice hockey player (born 1965)

- Born: September 7, 1965 (age 60) Kingston, Ontario, Canada
- Height: 6 ft 3 in (191 cm)
- Weight: 195 lb (88 kg; 13 st 13 lb)
- Position: Defence
- Shot: Left
- Played for: St. Louis Blues; New York Islanders
- NHL draft: 24th overall, 1983; New Jersey Devils
- Playing career: 1985–1999

Shawn Evans (born September 7, 1965) is a Canadian former ice hockey player.

== Early life ==
Evans was born in Kingston, Ontario. As a youth, he played in the 1978 Quebec International Pee-Wee Hockey Tournament with a minor ice hockey team from Kingston Township.

== Career ==
Evans played nine games in the National Hockey League between 1986 and 1989 with the St. Louis Blues and New York Islanders. The rest of his career, which lasted from 1985 to 1999, was spent in various minor leagues. At one time, he held the single season American Hockey League record for assists by a defenseman, a mark he set with the Nova Scotia Oilers in 1987 and surpassed in 1992 with the Springfield Indians.

After retiring as a player, he became the head coach and general manager of the Truro Bearcats.

== Career statistics ==
=== Regular season and playoffs ===
| | | | Regular season | | | | | Playoffs |
| Season | Team | League | GP | G | A | Pts | PIM | GP | G | A | Pts | PIM |
|---|---|---|---|---|---|---|---|---|---|---|---|---|
| 1981–82 | Kitchener Ranger B's | MWJHL | 21 | 9 | 13 | 22 | 55 | — | — | — | — | — |
| 1982–83 | Peterborough Petes | OHL | 58 | 7 | 41 | 48 | 116 | 4 | 2 | 0 | 2 | 12 |
| 1983–84 | Peterborough Petes | OHL | 67 | 21 | 88 | 109 | 116 | 8 | 1 | 16 | 17 | 8 |
| 1984–85 | Peterborough Petes | OHL | 66 | 16 | 83 | 99 | 78 | 16 | 6 | 18 | 24 | 6 |
| 1985–86 | St. Louis Blues | NHL | 7 | 0 | 0 | 0 | 2 | — | — | — | — | — |
| 1985–86 | Peoria Rivermen | IHL | 55 | 8 | 26 | 34 | 36 | — | — | — | — | — |
| 1986–87 | Nova Scotia Oilers | AHL | 55 | 7 | 28 | 35 | 29 | 5 | 0 | 4 | 4 | 6 |
| 1987–88 | Nova Scotia Oilers | AHL | 79 | 8 | 62 | 70 | 109 | 5 | 1 | 1 | 2 | 40 |
| 1988–89 | Springfield Indians | AHL | 68 | 9 | 50 | 59 | 125 | — | — | — | — | — |
| 1989–90 | New York Islanders | NHL | 2 | 1 | 0 | 1 | 0 | — | — | — | — | — |
| 1989–90 | Springfield Indians | AHL | 63 | 6 | 35 | 41 | 102 | 18 | 6 | 11 | 17 | 35 |
| 1990–91 | EHC Olten | NLA | 8 | 1 | 4 | 5 | 20 | — | — | — | — | — |
| 1990–91 | Maine Mariners | AHL | 51 | 9 | 37 | 46 | 44 | 2 | 0 | 1 | 1 | 0 |
| 1991–92 | Springfield Indians | AHL | 80 | 11 | 67 | 78 | 81 | 11 | 0 | 8 | 8 | 16 |
| 1992–93 | Milwaukee Admirals | IHL | 79 | 13 | 65 | 78 | 83 | 6 | 0 | 3 | 3 | 6 |
| 1993–94 | HC Devils Milano | ITA | 13 | 2 | 10 | 12 | 6 | 8 | 0 | 2 | 2 | 20 |
| 1994–95 | Milwaukee Admirals | IHL | 58 | 6 | 34 | 40 | 20 | — | — | — | — | — |
| 1994–95 | Fort Wayne Komets | IHL | 11 | 2 | 8 | 10 | 6 | 4 | 1 | 3 | 4 | 2 |
| 1995–96 | Fort Wayne Komets | IHL | 81 | 5 | 61 | 66 | 78 | 5 | 3 | 3 | 6 | 2 |
| 1996–97 | Fort Wayne Komets | IHL | 41 | 7 | 13 | 20 | 34 | — | — | — | — | — |
| 1996–97 | Manitoba Moose | IHL | 17 | 2 | 3 | 5 | 4 | — | — | — | — | — |
| 1996–97 | Cincinnati Cyclones | IHL | 21 | 3 | 9 | 12 | 24 | 3 | 0 | 0 | 0 | 14 |
| 1997–98 | Baton Rouge Kingfish | ECHL | 49 | 5 | 17 | 22 | 40 | — | — | — | — | — |
| 1997–98 | Cincinnati Cyclones | IHL | 3 | 0 | 0 | 0 | 2 | — | — | — | — | — |
| 1998–99 | Mohawk Valley Prowlers | UHL | 11 | 0 | 5 | 5 | 20 | — | — | — | — | — |
| AHL totals | | | 396 | 50 | 279 | 329 | 490 | 41 | 7 | 25 | 32 | 97 |
| IHL totals | | | 366 | 46 | 219 | 265 | 287 | 18 | 4 | 9 | 13 | 24 |
| NHL totals | | | 9 | 1 | 0 | 1 | 2 | — | — | — | — | — |
