= Wade Campbell =

Canadian ice hockey player

- Born: January 2, 1961 (age 65) Peace River, Alberta, Canada
- Height: 6 ft 4 in (193 cm)
- Weight: 220 lb (100 kg; 15 st 10 lb)
- Position: Defence
- Shot: Right
- Played for: Winnipeg Jets; Boston Bruins
- NHL draft: Undrafted
- Playing career: 1982–1991

Wade Allan "Tiny" Campbell (born January 2, 1961) is a Canadian former professional ice hockey defenceman who played in the National Hockey League for the Winnipeg Jets and the Boston Bruins between 1982 and 1988. Campbell signed with Winnipeg as a free-agent in 1982 as a walk on out of University of Alberta. He went on to play a total of 213 regular season games, scoring 9 goals and 27 assists for 36 points, collecting 305 penalty minutes. He retired in 1991.

Campbell was born in Peace River, Alberta.

== Career statistics ==
			Regular season					Playoffs
Season	Team	League	GP	G	A	Pts	PIM	GP	G	A	Pts	PIM
1979–80	University of Illinois at Chicago	NCAA	26	10	16	26	56	—	—	—	—	—
1980–81	University of Alberta	CIAU	44	12	21	33	34	—	—	—	—	—
1981–82	University of Alberta	CIAU	42	8	26	34	85	—	—	—	—	—
1982–83	Winnipeg Jets	NHL	42	1	2	3	50	—	—	—	—	—
1982–83	Sherbrooke Jets	AHL	18	4	2	6	23	—	—	—	—	—
1983–84	Winnipeg Jets	NHL	79	7	14	21	147	3	0	0	0	7
1984–85	Sherbrooke Canadiens	AHL	28	2	6	8	70	—	—	—	—	—
1984–85	Winnipeg Jets	NHL	40	1	6	7	21	10	0	0	0	16
1985–86	Sherbrooke Canadiens	AHL	9	0	2	2	26	—	—	—	—	—
1985–86	Moncton Golden Flames	AHL	17	2	2	4	21	10	0	0	0	16
1985–86	Winnipeg Jets	NHL	24	0	1	1	27	—	—	—	—	—
1985–86	Boston Bruins	NHL	8	0	0	0	15	—	—	—	—	—
1986–87	Moncton Golden Flames	AHL	64	12	23	35	34	—	—	—	—	—
1986–87	Boston Bruins	NHL	14	0	3	3	24	4	0	0	0	11
1987–88	Maine Mariners	AHL	69	11	29	40	118	10	2	4	6	29
1987–88	Boston Bruins	NHL	6	0	1	1	21	—	—	—	—	—
1988–89	Boxers de Bordeaux	France	30	8	12	20	79	—	—	—	—	—
1989–90	Cape Breton Oilers	AHL	77	4	31	35	84	6	2	3	5	6
1990–91	Cape Breton Oilers	AHL	66	8	13	21	54	4	1	1	2	4
NHL totals			213	9	27	36	305	10	0	0	0	20
AHL totals			348	43	108	151	430	30	5	8	13	55
