= Allan Stewart (ice hockey) =

Canadian ice hockey player

- Born: January 31, 1964 (age 61); Fort St. John, British Columbia, Canada
- Height: 6 ft 0 in (183 cm)
- Weight: 195 lb (88 kg; 13 st 13 lb)
- Position: Left wing
- Shot: Left
- Played for: New Jersey Devils; Boston Bruins
- NHL draft: 205th overall, 1983; New Jersey Devils
- Playing career: 1984–1993

Allan Stewart (born January 31, 1964) is a Canadian former professional ice hockey left winger. He played for the New Jersey Devils and Boston Bruins.

== Career statistics ==
			Regular season					Playoffs
Season	Team	League	GP	G	A	Pts	PIM	GP	G	A	Pts	PIM
1981–82	Prince Albert Raiders	SJHL	46	9	25	34	168	—	—	—	—	—
1982–83	Prince Albert Raiders	WHL	70	25	34	59	272	—	—	—	—	—
1983–84	Prince Albert Raiders	WHL	67	44	39	83	216	5	1	2	3	39
1983–84	Maine Mariners	AHL	—	—	—	—	—	3	0	0	0	0
1984–85	Maine Mariners	AHL	75	8	11	19	241	11	1	2	3	58
1985–86	New Jersey Devils	NHL	4	0	0	0	21	—	—	—	—	—
1985–86	Maine Mariners	AHL	58	7	12	19	181	—	—	—	—	—
1986–87	New Jersey Devils	NHL	7	1	0	1	26	—	—	—	—	—
1986–87	Maine Mariners	AHL	74	14	24	38	143	—	—	—	—	—
1987–88	New Jersey Devils	NHL	1	0	0	0	0	—	—	—	—	—
1987–88	Utica Devils	AHL	49	8	17	25	129	—	—	—	—	—
1988–89	New Jersey Devils	NHL	6	0	2	2	15	—	—	—	—	—
1988–89	Utica Devils	AHL	72	9	23	32	110	5	1	0	1	4
1989–90	Utica Devils	AHL	1	0	0	0	0	1	0	0	0	11
1990–91	New Jersey Devils	NHL	41	5	2	7	159	—	—	—	—	—
1990–91	Utica Devils	AHL	9	2	0	2	9	—	—	—	—	—
1991–92	New Jersey Devils	NHL	1	0	0	0	5	—	—	—	—	—
1991–92	Boston Bruins	NHL	4	0	0	0	17	—	—	—	—	—
1992–93	Moncton Hawks	AHL	45	3	8	11	118	2	1	0	1	20
NHL totals			64	6	4	10	243	—	—	—	—	—
AHL totals			383	51	95	146	931	22	3	2	5	93
