= Jamie Husgen =

American ice hockey player (born 1964)

- Born: October 13, 1964 (age 61) Florissant, Missouri, USA
- Height: 6 ft 3 in (191 cm)
- Weight: 216 lb (98 kg; 15 st 6 lb)
- Position: Defence
- Shot: Right
- Played for: AHL; Sherbrooke Canadiens; Moncton Hawks; IHL; Milwaukee Admirals
- NHL draft: 229th overall, 1983; Winnipeg Jets
- Playing career: 1987–1989

Jamie Husgen (born October 13, 1964) is a retired American professional ice hockey player. He was selected by the Winnipeg Jets in the 12th round (229th overall) of the 1983 NHL entry draft.

On February 9, 1989, the Winnipeg Jets traded Husgen to the Vancouver Canucks in exchange for future considerations. The Canucks then assigned Husgen to play for the Milwaukee Admirals of the International Hockey League.
