= Doug Soetaert =

Canadian ice hockey player

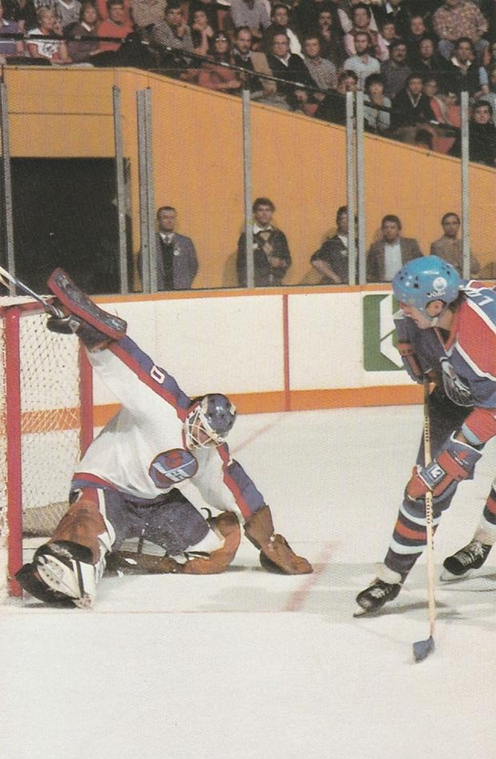
- Born: April 21, 1955 (age 70) Edmonton, Alberta, Canada
- Height: 6 ft 1 in (185 cm)
- Weight: 185 lb (84 kg; 13 st 3 lb)
- Position: Goaltender
- Caught: Left
- Played for: New York Rangers; Winnipeg Jets; Montreal Canadiens
- NHL draft: 30th overall, 1975; New York Rangers
- Playing career: 1975–1987

Douglas Henry Soetaert (born April 21, 1955) is a Canadian former professional ice hockey goaltender. He was selected by the New York Rangers in the second round (30th overall) of the 1975 NHL Amateur Draft. He played 12 seasons in the National Hockey League with the Rangers, Winnipeg Jets, and Montreal Canadiens. After his playing career, he took on hockey executive roles with Kansas City Blades, Everett Silvertips, and Omaha Ak-Sar-Ben Knights. In the 2016–17 season he was general manager of the Tucson Roadrunners in the American Hockey League.

== Career statistics ==
=== Regular season and playoffs ===
			Regular season									Playoffs
Season	Team	League	GP	W	L	T	MIN	GA	SO	GAA	SV%	GP	W	L	MIN	GA	SO	GAA	SV%
1970–71	Edmonton Oil Kings	WHL	3	—	—	—	180	21	0	7.00	—	—	—	—	—	—	—	—	—
1971–72	Edmonton Oil Kings	WCHL	37	—	—	—	1738	105	3	3.62	—	6	—	—	267	13	0	2.92	—
1972–73	Edmonton Oil Kings	WCHL	43	—	—	—	2111	129	1	3.67	—	6	—	—	339	33	0	5.84	—
1973–74	Edmonton Oil Kings	WCHL	39	12	18	6	2190	163	1	4.47	.879	3	—	—	141	9	0	3.83	—
1974–75	Edmonton Oil Kings	WCHL	65	31	27	5	3706	273	1	4.42	.880	—	—	—	—	—	—	—	—
1975–76	New York Rangers	NHL	8	2	2	0	272	24	0	5.29	.856	—	—	—	—	—	—	—	—
1975–76	Providence Reds	AHL	16	6	9	1	896	65	0	4.35	—	1	0	1	59	6	0	6.10	—
1976–77	New York Rangers	NHL	12	3	4	1	569	28	1	2.95	.904	—	—	—	—	—	—	—	—
1976–77	New Haven Nighthawks	AHL	16	6	9	0	947	61	0	3.86	.872	—	—	—	—	—	—	—	—
1977–78	New York Rangers	NHL	6	2	2	2	360	20	0	3.34	.900	—	—	—	—	—	—	—	—
1977–78	New Haven Nighthawks	AHL	38	16	16	6	2252	141	0	3.75	.889	15	8	7	916	53	0	3.47	—
1978–79	New York Rangers	NHL	17	5	7	3	898	57	0	3.81	.869	—	—	—	—	—	—	—	—
1978–79	New Haven Nighthawks	AHL	3	2	1	0	180	11	1	3.67	.863	—	—	—	—	—	—	—	—
1979–80	New York Rangers	NHL	8	5	2	0	434	33	0	4.57	.846	—	—	—	—	—	—	—	—
1979–80	New Haven Nighthawks	AHL	32	17	18	5	1808	108	3	3.58	.884	8	5	3	478	24	0	3.01	—
1980–81	New York Rangers	NHL	39	16	16	7	2317	152	0	3.94	.854	—	—	—	—	—	—	—	—
1980–81	New Haven Nighthawks	AHL	12	5	5	1	668	35	2	3.14	.896	4	0	3	220	19	0	5.18	—
1981–82	Winnipeg Jets	NHL	39	13	14	8	2155	155	2	4.32	.870	2	1	1	120	8	0	4.00	.871
1982–83	Winnipeg Jets	NHL	44	19	19	6	2531	174	0	4.12	.869	1	0	0	20	0	0	0.00	1.000
1983–84	Winnipeg Jets	NHL	47	18	15	7	2531	181	0	4.29	.869	1	0	1	20	5	0	15.00	.737
1984–85	Montreal Canadiens	NHL	28	14	9	4	1600	91	0	3.41	.853	1	0	0	20	1	0	3.00	.889
1985–86	Montreal Canadiens	NHL	23	11	7	2	1213	56	3	2.77	.895	—	—	—	—	—	—	—	—
1986–87	New York Rangers	NHL	13	2	7	2	673	58	0	5.17	.842	—	—	—	—	—	—	—	—
NHL totals			284	110	104	42	15553	1029	6	3.97	.867	5	1	2	180	14	0	4.67	.860

=== International ===
Year	Team	Event	GP	W	L	T	MIN	GA	SO	GAA	SV%
1975	Canada	WJC	2	—	—	—	120	5	0	2.50	—
Junior totals			2	—	—	—	120	5	0	2.50	—

== Awards and achievements ==
- 1986 Stanley Cup Championship (Montreal)
