= 1983–84 NHL season =

National Hockey League season

- League: National Hockey League
- Sport: Ice hockey
- Duration: October 4, 1983 – May 19, 1984
- Games: 80
- Teams: 21
- TV partner(s): CBC, SRC (Canada); USA (United States)

Draft
- Top draft pick: Brian Lawton
- Picked by: Minnesota North Stars

Regular season
- Season champions: Edmonton Oilers
- Season MVP: Wayne Gretzky (Oilers)
- Top scorer: Wayne Gretzky (Oilers)

Playoffs
- Playoffs MVP: Mark Messier (Oilers)

Stanley Cup
- Champions: Edmonton Oilers
- Runners-up: New York Islanders

NHL seasons
- 1982–83 1984–85

The 1983–84 NHL season was the 67th season of the National Hockey League. The Edmonton Oilers de-throned the four-time defending Stanley Cup champion New York Islanders four games to one in the Cup Final.

== League business ==
=== Ownership changes ===
Arthur M. Wirtz, long-time chairman and part-owner of the Chicago Black Hawks, died at the age of 82 on July 21, 1983. His son, Bill, took over ownership of the team.

St. Louis Blues owner Ralston Purina announced that it would sell the team to a group led by World Hockey Association (WHA) and Edmonton Oilers founder Bill Hunter, with the intent on relocating the Blues to Saskatoon, Saskatchewan. However, the NHL Board of Governors rejected the deal by a 15–3 vote on May 18, feeling that Saskatoon was not big enough to support an NHL team, and also wary of Hunter's involvement based on his roles in the WHA. Ralston then filed an anti-trust lawsuit in U.S. District Court, claiming that the NHL broke federal antitrust laws and breached the duty of good faith and fair dealing by voting to reject the sale and transfer of the Blues to Hunter's group. They also requested that the court allow them to give up the team and bar the NHL from interfering with the sale of the team. On June 3, Ralston announced that it had no interest in running the team anymore. Because they were not required to participate in the 1983 NHL entry draft, they did not send a representative, which led the Blues to forfeit their picks. The day after the draft, the NHL filed a counter-suit against Ralston, accusing Ralston of "damaging the league by willfully, wantonly and maliciously collapsing its St. Louis Blues hockey operation." The NHL also said that Ralston broke a league rule that an owner had to give two years' notice before dissolving a franchise. Ralston called the counter-suit "ridiculous" and gave the NHL an ultimatum: if the NHL would not accept Hunter's offer by June 14, Ralston would dissolve the team and sell its players and assets to other teams. The Board of Governors rejected the offer and "terminated" the team on June 13, one day before Ralston's supposed deadline. It then took control of the franchise and began searching for a new owner. On July 27, Harry Ornest purchased the Blues for US$3 million.

=== Entry draft ===
The 1983 NHL entry draft was held on June 8, at the Montreal Forum in Montreal, Quebec. The St. Louis Blues did not participate in this draft due to the aforementioned dispute between the league and team owner Ralston Purina. Brian Lawton became the first American to be chosen first overall, by the Minnesota North Stars. Three Americans were chosen in the top five: Lawton, Pat Lafontaine (third) and Tom Barrasso (fifth). Sylvain Turgeon was chosen second and Steve Yzerman was chosen fourth overall.

=== Rule changes ===
Not since World War II travel restrictions caused the NHL to drop regular season overtime games in 1942–43 had the NHL used overtime to decide regular season games. Starting this season, the NHL introduced a five-minute extra period of overtime following the third period in the event of a tied game. A team losing in overtime would get no points. This rule remained in effect until the 1999–2000 season, where a team losing in overtime was awarded 1 point. If the game remained tied after the five-minute extra period, it remained a tie with each team getting 1 point, until the NHL shootout arrived in the 2005–06 season. Overtime in the Stanley Cup playoffs remained unchanged.

== Arena changes ==
- The Calgary Flames moved from the Stampede Corral to Olympic Saddledome.
- The St. Louis Blues's home arena, the Checkerdome, reverted to its original St. Louis Arena name, reflecting Harry Ornest taking over ownership of the team and the arena from Ralston Purina.

== Regular season ==
The Edmonton Oilers ran away with the best record in the league, and for the third straight year set a new record for most goals in a season, 446. The Oilers' new captain, Wayne Gretzky, was once again breaking records and rewriting his name into the record book. This season saw Gretzky score at least one point in the first 51 games of the season. During those 51 games, Gretzky had 61 goals and 92 assists for 153 points, which is equivalent to exactly three points per game. He also won his fifth straight Hart Trophy and his fourth straight Art Ross Trophy by scoring 87 goals and 118 assists for a total of 205 points. The season's second leading scorer was Gretzky's teammate Paul Coffey, who, with 126 points, became the third defenceman to score 100 points in a season.

The Calgary Flames played their inaugural season at the Olympic Saddledome.

Prior to the season, the St. Louis Blues were purchased by Harry Ornest, keeping the team from folding after a proposed move to Saskatoon, Saskatchewan was rejected by the NHL Board of Governors. The Blues remain in Missouri as of 2026. In addition, the team's home venue, the Checkerdome, reverted to its original name, the Arena, after six seasons.

=== Final standings ===
Note: GP = Games played; W = Wins; L = Losses; T = Ties; GF = Goals for; GA = Goals against; Pts = Points; PIM = Penalties in minutes

==== Prince of Wales Conference ====
Adams Division
| | GP | W | L | T | GF | GA | Pts |
|---|---|---|---|---|---|---|---|
| Boston Bruins | 80 | 49 | 25 | 6 | 336 | 261 | 104 |
| Buffalo Sabres | 80 | 48 | 25 | 7 | 315 | 257 | 103 |
| Quebec Nordiques | 80 | 42 | 28 | 10 | 360 | 278 | 94 |
| Montreal Canadiens | 80 | 35 | 40 | 5 | 286 | 295 | 75 |
| Hartford Whalers | 80 | 28 | 42 | 10 | 288 | 320 | 66 |

Patrick Division
| | GP | W | L | T | GF | GA | Pts |
|---|---|---|---|---|---|---|---|
| New York Islanders | 80 | 50 | 26 | 4 | 357 | 269 | 104 |
| Washington Capitals | 80 | 48 | 27 | 5 | 308 | 226 | 101 |
| Philadelphia Flyers | 80 | 44 | 26 | 10 | 350 | 290 | 98 |
| New York Rangers | 80 | 42 | 29 | 9 | 314 | 304 | 93 |
| New Jersey Devils | 80 | 17 | 56 | 7 | 231 | 350 | 41 |
| Pittsburgh Penguins | 80 | 16 | 58 | 6 | 254 | 390 | 38 |

==== Clarence Campbell Conference ====
Norris Division
| | GP | W | L | T | GF | GA | Pts |
|---|---|---|---|---|---|---|---|
| Minnesota North Stars | 80 | 39 | 31 | 10 | 345 | 344 | 88 |
| St. Louis Blues | 80 | 32 | 41 | 7 | 293 | 316 | 71 |
| Detroit Red Wings | 80 | 31 | 42 | 7 | 298 | 323 | 69 |
| Chicago Black Hawks | 80 | 30 | 42 | 8 | 277 | 311 | 68 |
| Toronto Maple Leafs | 80 | 26 | 45 | 9 | 303 | 387 | 61 |

Smythe Division
| | GP | W | L | T | GF | GA | Pts |
|---|---|---|---|---|---|---|---|
| Edmonton Oilers | 80 | 57 | 18 | 5 | 446 | 314 | 119 |
| Calgary Flames | 80 | 34 | 32 | 14 | 311 | 314 | 82 |
| Vancouver Canucks | 80 | 32 | 39 | 9 | 306 | 328 | 73 |
| Winnipeg Jets | 80 | 31 | 38 | 11 | 340 | 374 | 73 |
| Los Angeles Kings | 80 | 23 | 44 | 13 | 309 | 376 | 59 |

== Playoffs ==
=== Bracket ===
The top four teams in each division qualified for the playoffs. In the division semifinals, the fourth seeded team in each division played against the division winner from their division. The other series matched the second and third place teams from the divisions. The two winning teams from each division's semifinals then met in the division finals. The two division winners of each conference then played in the conference finals. The two conference winners then advanced to the Stanley Cup Final.

In the division semifinals, teams competed in a best-of-five series. In the other three rounds, teams competed in a best-of-seven series (scores in the bracket indicate the number of games won in each series).

Division semifinals | Division finals
A1 | Boston | 0
A4 | Montreal | 3
A4 | Montreal | 4
A3 | Quebec | 2
A2 | Buffalo | 0
A3 | Quebec | 3
Prince of Wales Conference
P1 | NY Islanders | 3
P4 | NY Rangers | 2
P1 | NY Islanders | 4
P2 | Washington | 1
P2 | Washington | 3
P3 | Philadelphia | 0
N1 | Minnesota | 3
N4 | Chicago | 2
N1 | Minnesota | 4
N2 | St. Louis | 3
N2 | St. Louis | 3
N3 | Detroit | 1
Clarence Campbell Conference
S1 | Edmonton | 3
S4 | Winnipeg | 0
S1 | Edmonton | 4
S2 | Calgary | 3
S2 | Calgary | 3
S3 | Vancouver | 1

Conference finals
A4 | Montreal | 2
P1 | NY Islanders | 4
N1 | Minnesota | 0
S1 | Edmonton | 4

Stanley Cup Final
P1 | NY Islanders | 1
S1 | Edmonton | 4

== Awards ==
1983–84 NHL awards
| Award | Recipient(s) | Runners-up/finalists |
|---|---|---|
| Prince of Wales Trophy (Wales Conference playoff champion) | New York Islanders | Montreal Canadiens |
| Clarence S. Campbell Bowl (Campbell Conference playoff champion) | Edmonton Oilers | Minnesota North Stars |
| Art Ross Trophy (Player with most points) | Wayne Gretzky (Edmonton Oilers) | Paul Coffey (Edmonton Oilers) |
| Bill Masterton Memorial Trophy (Perseverance, sportsmanship, and dedication) | Brad Park (Detroit Red Wings) | N/A |
| Calder Memorial Trophy (Best first-year player) | Tom Barrasso (Buffalo Sabres) | Steve Yzerman (Detroit Red Wings) |
| Conn Smythe Trophy (Most valuable player, playoffs) | Mark Messier (Edmonton Oilers) | N/A |
| Emery Edge Award (Best plus-minus statistic) | Wayne Gretzky (Edmonton Oilers) | Bryan Trottier (New York Islanders) |
| Frank J. Selke Trophy (Defensive forward) | Doug Jarvis (Washington Capitals) | Bryan Trottier (New York Islanders) |
| Hart Memorial Trophy (Most valuable player, regular season) | Wayne Gretzky (Edmonton Oilers) | Rod Langway (Washington Capitals) |
| Jack Adams Award (Best coach) | Bryan Murray (Washington Capitals) | Scotty Bowman (Buffalo Sabres) |
| James Norris Memorial Trophy (Best defenceman) | Rod Langway (Washington Capitals) | Paul Coffey (Edmonton Oilers) |
| Lady Byng Memorial Trophy (Sportsmanship and excellence) | Mike Bossy (New York Islanders) | Rick Middleton (Boston Bruins) |
| Lester B. Pearson Award (Outstanding player) | Wayne Gretzky (Edmonton Oilers) | N/A |
| Vezina Trophy (Best goaltender) | Tom Barrasso (Buffalo Sabres) | Rejean Lemelin (Calgary Flames) |
| William M. Jennings Trophy (Goaltenders of team with fewest goals against) | Al Jensen and Pat Riggin (Washington Capitals) | Tom Barrasso and Bob Sauve (Buffalo Sabres) |

=== All-Star teams ===
| First Team | Position | Second Team |
|---|---|---|
| Tom Barrasso, Buffalo Sabres | G | Pat Riggin, Washington Capitals |
| Rod Langway, Washington Capitals | D | Paul Coffey, Edmonton Oilers |
| Ray Bourque, Boston Bruins | D | Denis Potvin, New York Islanders |
| Wayne Gretzky, Edmonton Oilers | C | Bryan Trottier, New York Islanders |
| Mike Bossy, New York Islanders | RW | Jari Kurri, Edmonton Oilers |
| Michel Goulet, Quebec Nordiques | LW | Mark Messier, Edmonton Oilers |

Source: NHL.

== Player statistics ==
=== Scoring leaders ===
Note: GP = Games played; G = Goals; A = Assists; Pts = Points

| Player | Team | GP | G | A | Pts | PIM |
|---|---|---|---|---|---|---|
| Wayne Gretzky | Edmonton Oilers | 74 | 87 | 118 | 205 | 39 |
| Paul Coffey | Edmonton Oilers | 80 | 40 | 86 | 126 | 104 |
| Michel Goulet | Quebec Nordiques | 75 | 56 | 65 | 121 | 76 |
| Peter Stastny | Quebec Nordiques | 80 | 46 | 73 | 119 | 73 |
| Mike Bossy | New York Islanders | 67 | 51 | 67 | 118 | 8 |
| Barry Pederson | Boston Bruins | 80 | 39 | 77 | 116 | 64 |
| Jari Kurri | Edmonton Oilers | 64 | 52 | 61 | 113 | 14 |
| Bryan Trottier | New York Islanders | 68 | 40 | 71 | 111 | 59 |
| Bernie Federko | St. Louis Blues | 79 | 41 | 66 | 107 | 43 |
| Rick Middleton | Boston Bruins | 80 | 47 | 58 | 105 | 14 |

Source: NHL.

=== Leading goaltenders ===
Note: GP = Games played; Min – Minutes played; GA = Goals against; GAA = Goals against average; W = Wins; L = Losses; T = Ties; SO = Shutouts; SV% = Save percentage

| Player | Team | GP | MIN | GA | GAA | W | L | T | SO | SV% |
|---|---|---|---|---|---|---|---|---|---|---|
| Pat Riggin | Washington Capitals | 41 | 2299 | 102 | 2.66 | 21 | 14 | 2 | 4 | .890 |
| Tom Barrasso | Buffalo Sabres | 42 | 2475 | 117 | 2.84 | 26 | 12 | 3 | 2 | .893 |
| Al Jensen | Washington Capitals | 43 | 2414 | 117 | 2.91 | 25 | 13 | 3 | 4 | .882 |
| Doug Keans | Boston Bruins | 33 | 1779 | 92 | 3.10 | 19 | 8 | 3 | 2 | .883 |
| Bob Froese | Philadelphia Flyers | 48 | 2863 | 150 | 3.14 | 28 | 13 | 7 | 2 | .887 |
| Pete Peeters | Boston Bruins | 50 | 2868 | 151 | 3.16 | 29 | 16 | 2 | 0 | .876 |
| Dan Bouchard | Quebec Nordiques | 57 | 3373 | 180 | 3.20 | 29 | 18 | 8 | 1 | .882 |
| Roland Melanson | N.Y. Islanders | 37 | 2019 | 110 | 3.27 | 20 | 11 | 2 | 0 | .903 |
| Richard Sevigny | Montreal Canadiens | 40 | 2203 | 124 | 3.38 | 16 | 18 | 2 | 1 | .869 |
| Murray Bannerman | Chicago Black Hawks | 56 | 3335 | 188 | 3.38 | 23 | 29 | 4 | 2 | .887 |

== Coaches ==
=== Patrick Division ===
- New Jersey Devils: Bill MacMillan and Tom McVie
- New York Islanders: Al Arbour
- New York Rangers: Herb Brooks
- Philadelphia Flyers: Bob McCammon and Mike Keenan
- Pittsburgh Penguins: Lou Angotti
- Washington Capitals: Bryan Murray

=== Adams Division ===
- Boston Bruins: Gerry Cheevers
- Buffalo Sabres: Scotty Bowman
- Hartford Whalers: Larry Pleau
- Montreal Canadiens: Bob Berry and Jacques Lemaire
- Quebec Nordiques: Michel Bergeron

=== Norris Division ===
- Chicago Black Hawks: Orval Tessier
- Detroit Red Wings: Nick Polano
- Minnesota North Stars: Glen Sonmor
- St. Louis Blues: Jacques Demers
- Toronto Maple Leafs: Mike Nykoluk

=== Smythe Division ===
- Calgary Flames: Bob Johnson
- Edmonton Oilers: Glen Sather
- Los Angeles Kings: Don Perry, Rogatien Vachon and Roger Neilson
- Vancouver Canucks: Roger Neilson and Harry Neale
- Winnipeg Jets: Tom Watt and Barry Long

== Milestones ==
=== Debuts ===
The following is a list of players of note who played their first NHL game in 1983–84 (listed with their first team, asterisk(*) marks debut in playoffs):

- Tom Barrasso, Buffalo Sabres
- Chris Chelios, Montreal Canadiens
- Geoff Courtnall, Boston Bruins
- Russ Courtnall, Toronto Maple Leafs
- Brian Curran, Boston Bruins
- Ken Daneyko, New Jersey Devils
- Bruce Driver, New Jersey Devils
- Patrick Flatley, New York Islanders
- Doug Gilmour, St. Louis Blues
- Dirk Graham, Minnesota North Stars
- Kelly Hrudey, New York Islanders
- Pat LaFontaine, New York Islanders
- Brian Lawton, Minnesota North Stars
- Claude Lemieux, Montreal Canadiens
- Doug Lidster, Vancouver Canucks
- Hakan Loob, Calgary Flames
- John MacLean, New Jersey Devils
- Marty McSorley, Pittsburgh Penguins
- Cam Neely, Vancouver Canucks
- James Patrick, New York Rangers
- Bob Rouse, Minnesota North Stars
- Peter Sundstrom, New York Rangers
- Sylvain Turgeon, Hartford Whalers
- Carey Wilson, Calgary Flames
- Steve Yzerman, Detroit Red Wings

=== Last games ===
The following is a list of players of note that played their last game in the NHL in 1983–84 (listed with their last team):

- Guy Lapointe, Boston Bruins
- Tony Esposito, Chicago Black Hawks
- Rick MacLeish, Detroit Red Wings
- Billy Harris, Los Angeles Kings
- Blaine Stoughton, New York Rangers
- Bill Barber, Philadelphia Flyers
- Bobby Clarke, Philadelphia Flyers
- Guy Chouinard, St. Louis Blues
- Michel Larocque, St. Louis Blues
- Dale McCourt, Toronto Maple Leafs
- Mike Palmateer, Toronto Maple Leafs
- Darcy Rota, Vancouver Canucks

== Broadcasting ==
Hockey Night in Canada on CBC Television televised Saturday night regular season games and Stanley Cup playoff games. This was the last season that the Molson-sponsored HNIC had sole Canadian national broadcast rights. During the next season, rival brewery Carling O'Keefe began airing games on CTV.

This was the second season of the league's U.S. national broadcast rights deal with USA, covering a slate of regular season games and selected playoff games.

== See also ==
- List of Stanley Cup champions
- 1983 NHL entry draft
- 1983–84 NHL transactions
- 36th National Hockey League All-Star Game
- NHL All-Star Game
- NHL All-Rookie Team
- Lester Patrick Trophy
- Ice hockey at the 1984 Winter Olympics
- 1983 in sports
- 1984 in sports
