= 1983 NHL entry draft =

1983 North American ice hockey draft

General information
- Date: June 8, 1983
- Location: Montreal Forum; Montreal, Quebec, Canada

Overview
- 242 total selections in 12 rounds
- First selection: (United States) Brian Lawton (Minnesota North Stars)
- Hall of Famers: 8: C Pat LaFontaine; C Steve Yzerman; G Tom Barrasso; RW Cam Neely; G Vladislav Tretiak; D Viacheslav Fetisov; G Dominik Hasek; RW Sergei Makarov

The 1983 NHL entry draft was the 21st draft for the National Hockey League. It was held at the Montreal Forum in Montreal on June 8, 1983. The NHL entry draft is the primary means by which players arrive in the NHL . The St. Louis Blues did not participate in this draft, shortly after the league blocked the franchise's relocation to Saskatoon. This was the only time in league history that a franchise did not participate in a draft. This was also the last time a playoff team picked first overall until 2020, when the New York Rangers won the first selection.

The last active player in the NHL from this draft class was Claude Lemieux, who retired after the 2008–09 season.

== Selections by round ==
Below are listed the selections in the 1983 NHL entry draft. Club teams are located in North America unless otherwise noted.

| = NHL All-Star team · | = NHL All-Star (Note: Players are identified as an All-Star if they were selected for the All-Star game at any time in their career.) · | = NHL All-Star and NHL All-Star team · | = Hall of Famers |

=== Round one ===
| # | Player | Nationality | NHL team | College/junior/club team |
|---|---|---|---|---|
| 1 | Brian Lawton (C) | United States | Minnesota North Stars (from Pittsburgh)^{1} | Mount St. Charles Academy (USHS-RI) |
| 2 | Sylvain Turgeon (LW) | Canada | Hartford Whalers | Hull Olympiques (QMJHL) |
| 3 | Pat LaFontaine (C) | United States | New York Islanders (from New Jersey)^{2} | Verdun Juniors (QMJHL) |
| 4 | Steve Yzerman (C) | Canada | Detroit Red Wings | Peterborough Petes (OHL) |
| 5 | Tom Barrasso (G) | United States | Buffalo Sabres (from Los Angeles)^{3} | Acton-Boxboro High School (USHS-MA) |
| 6 | John MacLean (RW) | Canada | New Jersey Devils (from St. Louis)^{4} | Oshawa Generals (OHL) |
| 7 | Russ Courtnall (C) | Canada | Toronto Maple Leafs | Victoria Cougars (WHL) |
| 8 | Andrew McBain (RW) | Canada | Winnipeg Jets | North Bay Centennials (OHL) |
| 9 | Cam Neely (RW) | Canada | Vancouver Canucks | Portland Winter Hawks (WHL) |
| 10 | Normand Lacombe (RW) | Canada | Buffalo Sabres (from Calgary)^{5} | University of New Hampshire (Hockey East) |
| 11 | Adam Creighton (C) | Canada | Buffalo Sabres (from Quebec)^{6} | Ottawa 67's (OHL) |
| 12 | Dave Gagner (C) | Canada | New York Rangers | Brantford Alexanders (OHL) |
| 13 | Dan Quinn (C) | Canada | Calgary Flames (from Buffalo)^{7} | Belleville Bulls (OHL) |
| 14 | Bobby Dollas (D) | Canada | Winnipeg Jets (from Washington)^{8} | Laval Voisins (QMJHL) |
| 15 | Bob Errey (LW) | Canada | Pittsburgh Penguins (from Minnesota)^{9} | Peterborough Petes (OHL) |
| 16 | Gerald Diduck (D) | Canada | New York Islanders | Lethbridge Broncos (WHL) |
| 17 | Alfie Turcotte (C) | United States | Montreal Canadiens | Portland Winter Hawks (WHL) |
| 18 | Bruce Cassidy (D) | Canada | Chicago Black Hawks | Ottawa 67's (OHL) |
| 19 | Jeff Beukeboom (D) | Canada | Edmonton Oilers | Sault Ste. Marie Greyhounds (OHL) |
| 20 | David Jensen (C) | United States | Hartford Whalers (from Philadelphia)^{10} | Lawrence Academy (USHS-MA) |
| 21 | Nevin Markwart (LW) | Canada | Boston Bruins | Regina Pats (WHL) |
^{Reference: "1983 NHL Entry Draft hockeydraftcentral.com". Archived from the original on January 22, 2009.}

1. The Pittsburgh Penguins' first-round pick went to the Minnesota North Stars as the result of a trade on October 28, 1982 that sent Anders Hakansson, Ron Meighan and Minnesota's 1st-rd pick in 1983 NHL Entry Draft in exchange for George Ferguson and this pick.
2. The New Jersey Devils' first-round pick went to the New York Islanders as the result of a trade on October 1, 1981 that sent Dave Cameron and Bob Lorimer to Colorado in exchange for this pick. The Colorado Rockies relocated to New Jersey to become the Devils for the 1982–83 NHL season.
3. The Los Angeles Kings' first-round pick went to the Buffalo Sabres as the result of a trade on March 10, 1981 that sent the Rick Martin to Los Angeles in exchange for Los Angeles' third-round pick in 1981 NHL entry draft and this pick.
4. The St. Louis Blues' first-round pick went to the New Jersey Devils as the result of a trade on June 9, 1982 that sent Rob Ramage to St. Louis in exchange for St. Louis' first-round pick in 1982 NHL entry draft and this pick.
5. The Calgary Flames' first-round pick went to the Buffalo Sabres as the result of a trade on June 8, 1982 that sent Richie Dunn, Don Edwards and Buffalo's second-round pick in 1982 NHL entry draft to Calgary in exchange for Calgary's first-round and second-round picks in 1982 NHL entry draft, second-round picks in 1983 NHL entry draft along with Buffalo's option to swap first-round picks in 1983 NHL entry draft (this pick).
6. The Quebec Nordiques' first-round pick went to the Buffalo Sabres as the result of a trade on June 8, 1983 that sent Tony McKegney, Jean-Francois Sauve, Andre Savard and Buffalo's 3rd-rd pick in 1983 NHL Entry Draft to Quebec in exchange for Real Cloutier and this pick.
7. The Buffalo Sabres' first-round pick went to the Calgary Flames as the result of a trade on June 8, 1982 that sent Calgary's first-round and second-round picks in 1982 NHL entry draft, second-round picks in 1983 NHL Entry Draft along with Buffalo's option to swap first-round picks in 1983 NHL Entry Draft to Buffalo in exchange for Richie Dunn, Don Edwards and Buffalo's second-round pick in 1982 NHL entry draft. Buffalo took option to swap which became this pick for Calgary.
8. The Washington Capitals' first-round pick went to the Winnipeg Jets as the result of a trade on June 8, 1983 that sent Dave Christian to Washington in exchange for this pick.
9. The Minnesota North Stars' first-round pick went to the Pittsburgh Penguins as the result of a trade on October 28, 1982 that sent George Ferguson and Pittsburgh's 1st-rd pick in 1983 NHL Entry Draft to Minnesota in exchange for Anders Hakansson, Ron Meighan and this pick.
10. The Philadelphia Flyers' first-round pick went to the Hartford Whalers as the result of a trade on August 19, 1982 that sent Mark Howe and Hartford's third-round in 1983 NHL Entry Draft to Philadelphia in exchange for Greg Adams, Ken Linseman, Philadelphia's third-round in 1983 NHL Entry Draft and this pick.

=== Round two ===
| # | Player | Nationality | NHL team | College/junior/club team |
|---|---|---|---|---|
| 22 | Todd Charlesworth (D) | Canada | Pittsburgh Penguins | Oshawa Generals (OHL) |
| 23 | Ville Siren (D) | Finland | Hartford Whalers | Tampere Ilves (Finland) |
| 24 | Shawn Evans (D) | Canada | New Jersey Devils | Peterborough Petes (OHL) |
| 25 | Lane Lambert (RW) | Canada | Detroit Red Wings | Saskatoon Blades (WHL) |
| 26 | Claude Lemieux (RW) | Canada | Montreal Canadiens (from Los Angeles)^{1} | Trois-Rivières Draveurs (QMJHL) |
| 27 | Sergio Momesso (LW) | Canada | Montreal Canadiens (from St. Louis)^{2} | Shawinigan Cataractes (QMJHL) |
| 28 | Jeff Jackson (LW) | Canada | Toronto Maple Leafs | Brantford Alexanders (OHL) |
| 29 | Brad Berry (D) | Canada | Winnipeg Jets | St. Albert Saints (AJHL) |
| 30 | David Bruce (RW) | Canada | Vancouver Canucks | Kitchener Rangers (OHL) |
| 31 | John Tucker (C) | Canada | Buffalo Sabres (from Calgary)^{3} | Kitchener (OHL) |
| 32 | Yves Heroux (RW) | Canada | Quebec Nordiques | Chicoutimi Saguenéens (QMJHL) |
| 33 | Randy Heath (LW) | Canada | New York Rangers | Portland Winter Hawks (WHL) |
| 34 | Richard Hajdu (LW) | Canada | Buffalo Sabres | Kamloops Junior Oilers (WHL) |
| 35 | Todd Francis (RW) | Canada | Montreal Canadiens (from Washington via Calgary)^{4} | Brantford Alexanders (OHL) |
| 36 | Malcolm Parks (C) | Canada | Minnesota North Stars | St. Albert Saints (AJHL) |
| 37 | Garnet McKechney (RW) | Canada | New York Islanders | Kitchener Rangers (OHL) |
| 38 | Frank Musil (D) | Czechoslovakia | Minnesota North Stars (from Montreal via Calgary)^{5} | Pardubice (Czechoslovakia) |
| 39 | Wayne Presley (RW) | United States | Chicago Black Hawks | Kitchener Rangers (OHL) |
| 40 | Mike Golden (C) | United States | Edmonton Oilers | Reading High School (USHS-MA) |
| 41 | Peter Zezel (C) | Canada | Philadelphia Flyers | Toronto Marlboros (OHL) |
| 42 | Greg Johnston (RW) | Canada | Boston Bruins | Toronto Marlboros (OHL) |
^{Reference: "1983 NHL Entry Draft hockeydraftcentral.com". Archived from the original on February 17, 2009.}

1. The Los Angeles Kings' second-round pick went to the Montreal Canadiens as the result of a trade on February 17, 1981 that sent the Rick Chartraw to Los Angeles in exchange for this pick.
2. The St. Louis Blues' second-round pick went to the Montreal Canadiens as the result of a trade on March 9, 1982 that sent the Guy Lapointe to St. Louis in exchange for this pick.
3. The Calgary Flames' second-round pick went to the Buffalo Sabres as the result of a trade on June 8, 1982 that sent Richie Dunn, Don Edwards and Buffalo's second-round pick in 1982 NHL entry draft to Calgary in exchange for Calgary's first-round and second-round picks in 1982 NHL entry draft, Buffalo's option to swap first-round picks in 1983 NHL Entry Draft along with this pick.
4. The Calgary Flames' second-round pick went to the Montreal Canadiens as the result of a trade on September 10, 1982 that sent the Doug Risebrough and Montreal's second-round pick in 1983 NHL Entry Draft to Calgary in exchange for Calgary's third-round pick in 1984 NHL entry draft and this pick.
  Calgary previously acquired this pick as the result of a trade on November 25, 1981 that sent Bobby Gould and Randy Holt to Washington in exchange for Pat Ribble and this pick.
5. The Calgary Flames' second-round pick went to the Minnesota North Stars as the result of a trade on June 8, 1982 that sent the Mike Eaves and Keith Hanson to Calgary in exchange for Steve Christoff and an optional second-round pick in 1983 NHL Entry Draft (this pick) or in 1984 NHL entry draft.
  Calgary previously acquired this pick as the result of a trade on September 10, 1982 that sent Calgary's second-round pick in 1983 NHL Entry Draft and third-round pick in 1984 NHL entry draft to Montreal in exchange for Doug Risebrough and this pick.

=== Round three ===
| # | Player | Nationality | NHL team | College/junior/club team |
|---|---|---|---|---|
| 43 | Peter Taglianetti (D) | United States | Winnipeg Jets (from Pittsburgh via Montreal)^{1} | Providence College (ECAC) |
| 44 | Derrick Smith (LW) | Canada | Philadelphia Flyers (from Hartford)^{2} | Peterborough Petes (OHL) |
| 45 | Daniel Letendre (RW) | Canada | Montreal Canadiens (from New Jersey)^{3} | Quebec Remparts (QMJHL) |
| 46 | Bob Probert (LW) | Canada | Detroit Red Wings | Brantford Alexanders (OHL) |
| 47 | Bruce Shoebottom (D) | Canada | Los Angeles Kings | Peterborough Petes (OHL) |
| 48 | Allan Bester (G) | Canada | Toronto Maple Leafs | Brantford Alexanders (OHL) |
| 49 | Vesa Salo (D) | Finland | New York Rangers (from Winnipeg)^{4} | Rauma (Finland) |
| 50 | Scott Tottle (RW) | Canada | Vancouver Canucks | Peterborough Petes (OHL) |
| 51 | Brian Bradley (C) | Canada | Calgary Flames | London Knights (OHL) |
| 52 | Bruce Bell (D) | Canada | Quebec Nordiques | Windsor Spitfires (OHL) |
| 53 | Gordie Walker (LW) | Canada | New York Rangers | Portland Winter Halks (WHL) |
| 54 | Iiro Jarvi (RW) | Finland | Quebec Nordiques (from Buffalo)^{5} | HIFK Helsinki (Finland) |
| 55 | Perry Berezan (C) | Canada | Calgary Flames (from Washington)^{6} | St. Albert Saints (AJHL) |
| 56 | Mitch Messier (C) | Canada | Minnesota North Stars | Notre Dame Hounds (SJHL) |
| 57 | Mike Neill (D) | Canada | New York Islanders | Sault Ste. Marie Greyhounds (OHL) |
| 58 | Mike Rowe (D) | Canada | Pittsburgh Penguins (from Montreal)^{7} | Toronto Marlboros (OHL) |
| 59 | Marc Bergevin (D) | Canada | Chicago Black Hawks | Chicoutimi Sagueneens (QMJHL) |
| 60 | Mike Flanagan (D) | United States | Edmonton Oilers | Acton-Boxborough High School (USHS-MA) |
| 61 | Leif Carlsson (D) | Sweden | Hartford Whalers (from Philadelphia)^{8} | Mora IK (Sweden) |
| 62 | Greg Puhalski (LW) | Canada | Boston Bruins | Kitchener Rangers (OHL) |
^{Reference: "1983 NHL Entry Draft hockeydraftcentral.com". Archived from the original on February 17, 2009.}

1. The Montreal Canadiens' third-round pick went to the Winnipeg Jets with $50,000 cash as compensation to allow Montreal to hire Serge Savard as the new general manager on April 28, 1983.
  Montreal previously acquired this pick as the result of a trade on September 26, 1980 that sent Gilles Lupien to Pittsburgh in exchange for Montreal's option to swap third-round picks.
2. The Hartford Whalers' third-round pick went to the Philadelphia Flyers as the result of a trade on August 19, 1982 that sent Greg Adams, Ken Linseman, Philadelphia's first-round and third-round picks in 1983 NHL Entry Draft in exchange for Mark Howe and this pick.
3. The New Jersey Devils' third-round pick went to the Montreal Canadiens as the result of a trade on March 10, 1981 that sent Bill Baker to Colorado in exchange for Montreal's option to swap fourth-round picks in 1984 NHL entry draft and this pick. Colorado relocated to New Jersey on May 27, 1982.
4. The Winnipeg Jets' third-round pick went to the New York Rangers as the result of a trade on September 8, 1981 that sent Doug Soetaert to Winnipeg in exchange for this pick.
5. The Buffalo Sabres' third-round pick went to the Quebec Nordiques as the result of a trade on June 8, 1983 that sent Real Cloutier and Quebec's 1st-rd pick in 1983 NHL Entry Draft to Buffalo in exchange for Tony McKegney, Jean-Francois Sauve, Andre Savard and this pick.
6. The Washington Capitals' third-round pick went to the Calgary Flames as the result of a trade on June 9, 1982 that sent Ken Houston and Pat Riggin to Washington in exchange for Howard Walker, George White, Washington's sixth-round pick in 1982 NHL entry draft, second-round pick in 1984 NHL entry draft and this pick.
7. The Montreal Canadiens' third-round pick went to the Pittsburgh Penguins as the result of a trade on September 26, 1980 that had Montreal's option to swap third-round picks with Pittsburgh in exchange for Gilles Lupien.
8. The Philadelphia Flyers' third-round pick went to the Hartford Whalers as the result of a trade on August 19, 1982 that sent Mark Howe and Hartford's third-round in 1983 NHL Entry Draft to Philadelphia in exchange for Greg Adams, Ken Linseman, Philadelphia's first-round in 1983 NHL Entry Draft and this pick.

=== Round four ===
| # | Player | Nationality | NHL team | College/junior/club team |
|---|---|---|---|---|
| 63 | Frank Pietrangelo (G) | Canada | Pittsburgh Penguins | University of Minnesota (WCHA) |
| 64 | Dave MacLean (RW) | Canada | Hartford Whalers | Belleville Bulls (OHL) |
| 65 | Mikko Makela (RW) | Finland | New York Islanders (from New Jersey)^{1} | Ilves Tampere (Finland) |
| 66 | John Bekkers (C) | Canada | Calgary Flames (from Detroit)^{2} | Regina Pats (WHL) |
| 67 | Guy Benoit (C) | Canada | Los Angeles Kings | Shawinigan Cataractes (QMJHL) |
| 68 | Dave Korol (D) | Canada | Detroit Red Wings (from Toronto via Los Angeles)^{3} | Winnipeg Warriors (WHL) |
| 69 | Bob Essensa (G) | Canada | Winnipeg Jets | Henry Carr Crusaders (MetJHL) |
| 70 | Tim Lorenz (LW) | Canada | Vancouver Canucks | Portland Winter Hawks (WHL) |
| 71 | Kevan Guy (D) | Canada | Calgary Flames | Medicine Hat Tigers (WHL) |
| 72 | Ron Chyzowski (C) | Canada | Hartford Whalers (from Quebec)^{4} | St. Albert Saints (AJHL) |
| 73 | Peter Andersson (D) | Sweden | New York Rangers | Orebro (Sweden) |
| 74 | Daren Puppa (G) | Canada | Buffalo Sabres | Kirkland Lake Midget All-Stars (COAAAMHL) |
| 75 | Tim Bergland (C) | United States | Washington Capitals | Thief River Falls High School (USHS-MN) |
| 76 | Brian Durand (C) | United States | Minnesota North Stars | Cloquet High School (USHS-MN) |
| 77 | Bill Claviter (LW) | United States | Calgary Flames (from Islanders via New Jersey)^{5} | Virginia High School (USHS-MN) |
| 78 | John Kordic (D) | Canada | Montreal Canadiens | Portland Winter Hawks (WHL) |
| 79 | Tarek Howard (D) | Canada | Chicago Black Hawks | Olds Grizzlys (AJHL) |
| 80 | Esa Tikkanen (LW) | Finland | Edmonton Oilers | HIFK Helsinki (Finland) |
| 81 | Allen Bourbeau (C) | United States | Philadelphia Flyers | Acton-Boxborough High School (USHS-MA) |
| 82 | Allan LaRochelle (G) | Canada | Boston Bruins | Saskatoon Blades (WHL) |
^{Reference: "1983 NHL Entry Draft hockeydraftcentral.com". Archived from the original on February 17, 2009.}

1. The New Jersey Devils' fourth-round pick went to the New York Islanders as the result of a trade on October 1, 1982 that sent the Islanders fourth-round pick in 1983 NHL Entry Draft to New Jersey in exchange for Hector Marini and this pick.
2. The Detroit Red Wings' fourth-round pick went to the Calgary Flames as the result of a trade on November 10, 1981 that sent Eric Vail to Detroit in exchange for Gary McAdam and this pick.
3. The Los Angeles Kings' fourth-round pick went to the Detroit Red Wings as the result of a trade on June 8, 1983 that sent Detroit's fourth-round pick in 1984 NHL entry draft to Los Angeles in exchange for this pick.
  Los Angeles acquired this pick as the result of a trade on October 19, 1982 sent Greg Terrion to Toronto in exchange for this pick.
4. The Quebec Nordiques' fourth-round pick went to the Hartford Whalers as the result of a trade on January 12, 1982 that sent John Garrett to Quebec in exchange for Michel Plasse and this pick.
5. The New Jersey Devils' fourth-round pick went to the Calgary Flames as the result of a trade on November 25, 1981 that sent Don Lever and Bob MacMillan to Colorado in exchange for Lanny McDonald and this pick. The Colorado Rockies relocated to New Jersey to become the Devils for the 1982–83 NHL season.
  New Jersey acquired this pick as the result of a trade on October 1, 1982 sent Hector Marini and New Jersey's fourth-round pick in 1983 NHL Entry Draft to the Islanders in exchange for this pick.

=== Round five ===
| # | Player | Nationality | NHL team | College/junior/club team |
|---|---|---|---|---|
| 83 | Dan Hodgson (C) | Canada | Toronto Maple Leafs (from Pittsburgh)^{1} | Prince Albert Raiders (WHL) |
| 84 | Bob Caulfield (RW) | United States | New York Islanders (from Hartford)^{2} | Detroit Lakes High School (USHS-MN) |
| 85 | Chris Terreri (G) | United States | New Jersey Devils | Providence College (ECAC) |
| 86 | Petr Klima (LW) | Czechoslovakia | Detroit Red Wings | Litvinov (Czechoslovakia) |
| 87 | Bob LaForest (RW) | Canada | Los Angeles Kings | North Bay Centennials (OHL) |
| 88 | Joe Kocur (RW) | Canada | Detroit Red Wings (from Toronto)^{3} | Saskatoon Blades (WHL) |
| 89 | Harry Armstrong (D) | United States | Winnipeg Jets | Dubuque Fighting Saints (USHL) |
| 90 | Doug Quinn (D) | Canada | Vancouver Canucks | Nanaimo Islanders (WHL) |
| 91 | Igor Liba (LW) | Czechoslovakia | Calgary Flames | Jihlava (Czechoslovakia) |
| 92 | Luc Guenette (G) | Canada | Quebec Nordiques | Quebec Remparts (QMJHL) |
| 93 | Jim Andonoff (RW) | United States | New York Rangers | Belleville Bulls (OHL) |
| 94 | Jason Meyer (D) | Canada | Buffalo Sabres | Regina Pats (WHL) |
| 95 | Martin Bouliane (C) | Canada | Washington Capitals | Granby Bisons (QMJHL) |
| 96 | Rich Geist (C) | United States | Minnesota North Stars | St Paul Academy (USHS-MN) |
| 97 | Ron Viglasi (D) | Canada | New York Islanders | Victoria Cougars (WHL) |
| 98 | Dan Wurst (D) | United States | Montreal Canadiens | Edina High School (USHS-MN) |
| 99 | Kevin Robinson (LW) | Canada | Chicago Black Hawks | Toronto Marlboros (OHL) |
| 100 | Garry Galley (D) | Canada | Los Angeles Kings (from Edmonton)^{4} | Bowling Green University (CCHA) |
| 101 | Jerome Carrier (D) | Canada | Philadelphia Flyers | Verdun Juniors (QMJHL) |
| 102 | Allen Pedersen (D) | Canada | Boston Bruins | Medicine Hat Tigers (WHL) |
^{Reference: "1983 NHL Entry Draft hockeydraftcentral.com". Archived from the original on February 19, 2009.}

1. The Pittsburgh Penguins' fifth-round pick went to the Toronto Maple Leafs as the result of a trade on February 3, 1982 that sent Greg Hotham to Pittsburgh in exchange for future considerations (Pittsburgh's 6th-rd pick in 1982 NHL entry draft) and this pick.
2. The Hartford Whalers' fifth-round pick went to the New York Islanders as the result of a trade on October 2, 1981 that sent Garry Howatt to Hartford in exchange for this pick.
3. The Toronto Maple Leafs' fourth-round pick went to the Detroit Red Wings as the result of a trade on March 8, 1982 that sent Jim Korn to Toronto in exchange for Toronto's 4th-rd pick in 1982 NHL entry draft and this pick.
4. The Edmonton Oilers' fifth-round pick went to the Los Angeles Kings as the result of a trade on August 10, 1981 that sent Jay McFarlane to Edmonton in exchange for this pick.

=== Round six ===
| # | Player | Nationality | NHL team | College/junior/club team |
|---|---|---|---|---|
| 103 | Patrick Emond (C) | Canada | Pittsburgh Penguins | Hull Olympiques (QMJHL) |
| 104 | Brian Johnson (D) | United States | Hartford Whalers | Silver Bay High School (USHS-MN) |
| 105 | Gord Mark (D) | Canada | New Jersey Devils | Kamloops Junior Oilers (WHL) |
| 106 | Chris Pusey (G) | Canada | Detroit Red Wings | Brantford Alexanders (OHL) |
| 107 | Dave Lundmark (D) | United States | Los Angeles Kings | Virginia High School (USHS-MN) |
| 108 | Kevin Stevens (C) | United States | Los Angeles Kings (from Toronto)^{1} | Silver Lake High School (USHS-MA) |
| 109 | Joel Baillargeon (LW) | Canada | Winnipeg Jets | Hull Olympiques (QMJHL) |
| 110 | Dave Lowry (LW) | Canada | Vancouver Canucks | London Knights (OHL) |
| 111 | Grant Blair (G) | Canada | Calgary Flames | Harvard University (ECAC) |
| 112 | Brad Walcot (D) | Canada | Quebec Nordiques | Kingston Canadians (OHL) |
| 113 | Bob Alexander (D) | United States | New York Rangers | Rosemount High School (USHS-MN) |
| 114 | Jim Hofford (D) | Canada | Buffalo Sabres | Windsor Spitfires (OHL) |
| 115 | Jari Torkki (LW) | Finland | Chicago Black Hawks (from Washington)^{2} | Rauma (Finland) |
| 116 | Tom McComb (D) | United States | Minnesota North Stars | Mount St. Charles Academy (USHS-RI) |
| 117 | Darin Illikainen (LW) | United States | New York Islanders | Hermantown High School (USHS-MN) |
| 118 | Arto Javanainen (RW) | Finland | Montreal Canadiens | Pori (Finland) |
| 119 | Mark LaVarre (RW) | United States | Chicago Black Hawks | Stratford Cullitons (MWJBHL) |
| 120 | Don Barber (LW) | Canada | Edmonton Oilers | Kelowna Buckaroos (BCJHL) |
| 121 | Rick Tocchet (RW) | Canada | Philadelphia Flyers | Sault Ste. Marie Greyhounds (OHL) |
| 122 | Terry Taillefer (G) | Canada | Boston Bruins | St. Albert Saints (AJHL) |
^{Reference: "1983 NHL Entry Draft hockeydraftcentral.com". Archived from the original on February 19, 2009.}

1. The Toronto Maple Leafs' sixth-round pick went to the Los Angeles Kings as the result of a trade on August 10, 1981 that sent Don Luce to Toronto in exchange for Bob Gladney and this pick.
2. The Washington Capitals' sixth-round pick went to the Chicago Black Hawks as the result of a trade on August 24, 1982 that sent Ted Bulley and Dave Hutchison to Washington in exchange for Washington's 5th-rd pick in 1984 NHL entry draft and this pick.

=== Round seven ===
| # | Player | Nationality | NHL team | College/junior/club team |
|---|---|---|---|---|
| 123 | Paul Ames (D) | United States | Pittsburgh Penguins | Billerica High School (USHS-MA) |
| 124 | Joe Reekie (D) | Canada | Hartford Whalers | North Bay Centennials (OHL) |
| 125 | Greg Evtushevski (RW) | Canada | New Jersey Devils | Kamloops Junior Oilers (WHL) |
| 126 | Bob Pierson (LW) | Canada | Detroit Red Wings | London Knights (OHL) |
| 127 | Tim Burgess (D) | Canada | Los Angeles Kings | Oshawa Generals (OHL) |
| 128 | Cam Plante (D) | Canada | Toronto Maple Leafs | Brandon Wheat Kings (WHL) |
| 129 | Iain Duncan (LW) | Canada | Winnipeg Jets | North York Rangers (OJHL) |
| 130 | Terry Maki (LW) | Canada | Vancouver Canucks | Brantford Alexanders (OHL) |
| 131 | Jeff Hogg (G) | Canada | Calgary Flames | Oshawa Generals (OHL) |
| 132 | Craig Mack (D) | United States | Quebec Nordiques | East Grand Forks High School (USHS-MN) |
| 133 | Steve Orth (C) | United States | New York Rangers | St. Cloud State University (WCHA) |
| 134 | Christian Ruuttu (C) | Finland | Buffalo Sabres | Pori (Finland) |
| 135 | Dwaine Hutton (C) | Canada | Washington Capitals | Kelowna Wings (WHL) |
| 136 | Sean Toomey (LW) | United States | Minnesota North Stars | Cretin-Derham Hall High School (USHS-MN) |
| 137 | Jim Sprenger (D) | United States | New York Islanders | Cloquet High School (USHS-MN) |
| 138 | Vladislav Tretiak (G) | Soviet Union | Montreal Canadiens | Moscow CSKA (USSR) |
| 139 | Scott Birnie (RW) | Canada | Chicago Black Hawks | Cornwall Royals (OHL) |
| 140 | Dale Derkatch (C) | Canada | Edmonton Oilers | Regina Pats (WHL) |
| 141 | Bob Mormina (RW) | Canada | Philadelphia Flyers | Longueuil Chevaliers (QMJHL) |
| 142 | Ian Armstrong (D) | Canada | Boston Bruins | Peterborough Petes (OHL) |
^{Reference: "1983 NHL Entry Draft hockeydraftcentral.com". Archived from the original on February 19, 2009.}

=== Round eight ===
| # | Player | Nationality | NHL team | College/junior/club team |
|---|---|---|---|---|
| 143 | Christian Duperron (D) | Canada | Hartford Whalers (from Pittsburgh)^{1} | Chicoutimi Sagueneens (QMJHL) |
| 144 | Jamie Falle (G) | Canada | Hartford Whalers | Clarkson University (ECAC) |
| 145 | Viacheslav Fetisov (D) | Soviet Union | New Jersey Devils | Moscow CSKA (USSR) |
| 146 | Craig Butz (D) | Canada | Detroit Red Wings | Kelowna Wings (WHL) |
| 147 | Ken Hammond (D) | Canada | Los Angeles Kings | Rensselaer Polytechnic Institute (ECAC) |
| 148 | Paul Bifano (LW) | Canada | Toronto Maple Leafs | Burnaby Bluehawks (BCJHL) |
| 149 | Ron Pesetti (D) | Canada | Winnipeg Jets | Western Michigan University (CCHA) |
| 150 | John Labatt (C) | United States | Vancouver Canucks | Minnetonka High School (USHS-MN) |
| 151 | Chris MacDonald (D) | Canada | Calgary Flames | Western Michigan University (CCHA) |
| 152 | Tommy Albelin (D) | Sweden | Quebec Nordiques | Djurgardens IF (Sweden) |
| 153 | Pete Marcov (LW) | Canada | New York Rangers | Welland Cougars (GHJHL) |
| 154 | Donald McSween (D) | United States | Buffalo Sabres | Redford Royals (NAJHL) |
| 155 | Marty Abrams (G) | Canada | Washington Capitals | Pembroke Lumber Kings (CJAHL) |
| 156 | Don Biggs (C) | Canada | Minnesota North Stars | Oshawa Generals (OHL) |
| 157 | Dale Henry (LW) | Canada | New York Islanders | Saskatoon Blades (WHL) |
| 158 | Rob Bryden (LW) | Canada | Montreal Canadiens | Henry Carr Crusaders (MetJHL) |
| 159 | Kent Paynter (D) | Canada | Chicago Black Hawks | Kitchener Rangers (OHL) |
| 160 | Ralph Vos (C) | Canada | Edmonton Oilers | Abbotsford Flyers (BCJHL) |
| 161 | Pelle Eklund (C) | Sweden | Philadelphia Flyers | Solna (Sweden) |
| 162 | Francois Olivier (LW) | Canada | Boston Bruins | St-Jean Castors (QMJHL) |
^{Reference: "1983 NHL Entry Draft hockeydraftcentral.com". Archived from the original on February 19, 2009.}

1. The Pittsburgh Penguins' eighth-round pick went to the Hartford Whalers as the result of a trade on December 29, 1981 that sent Rick MacLeish to Pittsburgh in exchange for Russ Anderson and this pick.

=== Round nine ===
| # | Player | Nationality | NHL team | College/junior/club team |
|---|---|---|---|---|
| 163 | Marty Ketola (RW) | United States | Pittsburgh Penguins | Cloquet High School (USHS-MN) |
| 164 | Bill Fordy (LW) | Canada | Hartford Whalers | Guelph Platers (OHL) |
| 165 | Jay Octeau (D) | United States | New Jersey Devils | Mount St. Charles Academy (USHS-RI) |
| 166 | Dave Sikorski (D) | United States | Detroit Red Wings | Cornwall Royals (OHL) |
| 167 | Bruce Fishback (C) | United States | Los Angeles Kings | White Bear Lake High School (USHS-MN) |
| 168 | Cliff Abrecht (D) | Canada | Toronto Maple Leafs | Princeton University (ECAC) |
| 169 | Todd Flichel (D) | Canada | Winnipeg Jets | Gloucester Rangers (COJHL) |
| 170 | Allan Measures (D) | Canada | Vancouver Canucks | Calgary Wranglers (WHL) |
| 171 | Rob Kivell (D) | Canada | Calgary Flames | Victoria Cougars (WHL) |
| 172 | Wayne Groulx (C) | Canada | Quebec Nordiques | Sault Ste. Marie Greyhounds (OHL) |
| 173 | Paul Jerrard (RW) | Canada | New York Rangers | Notre Dame Hounds (SJHL) |
| 174 | Tim Hoover (D) | Canada | Buffalo Sabres | Sault Ste. Marie Greyhounds (OHL) |
| 175 | Dave Cowan (LW) | United States | Washington Capitals | Washburn High School (USHS-MN) |
| 176 | Paul Pulis (RW) | United States | Minnesota North Stars | Hibbing High School (USHS-MN) |
| 177 | Kevin Vescio (D) | Canada | New York Islanders | North Bay Centennials (OHL) |
| 178 | Grant McKay (D) | Canada | Montreal Canadiens | University of Calgary (CIAU) |
| 179 | Brian Noonan (C) | United States | Chicago Black Hawks | Archbishop Williams High School (USHS-MA) |
| 180 | Dave Roach (G) | Canada | Edmonton Oilers | New Westminster Royals (BCJHL) |
| 181 | Robbie Nichols (LW) | Canada | Philadelphia Flyers | Kitchener Rangers (OHL) |
| 182 | Harri Laurila (D) | Finland | Boston Bruins | Lahti (Finland) |
^{Reference: "1983 NHL Entry Draft hockeydraftcentral.com". Archived from the original on February 19, 2009.}

=== Round ten ===
| # | Player | Nationality | NHL team | College/junior/club team |
|---|---|---|---|---|
| 183 | Alex Haidy (RW) | Canada | Pittsburgh Penguins | Sault Ste. Marie Greyhounds (OHL) |
| 184 | Greg Rolston (RW) | United States | Toronto Maple Leafs (from Hartford)^{1} | Powers High School (USHS-MI) |
| 185 | Alexander Chernykh (C) | Soviet Union | New Jersey Devils | Voskresensk (USSR) |
| 186 | Stu Grimson (LW) | Canada | Detroit Red Wings | Regina Pats (WHL) |
| 187 | Thomas Ahlen (D) | Sweden | Los Angeles Kings | Skellefteå AIK (Sweden) |
| 188 | Brian Ross (D) | Canada | Toronto Maple Leafs | Kitchener Rangers (OHL) |
| 189 | Kory Wright (RW) | United States | Winnipeg Jets | Dubuque Fighting Saints (USHL) |
| 190 | Roger Grillo (D) | United States | Vancouver Canucks | University of Maine (ECAC) |
| 191 | Tom Pratt (D) | United States | Calgary Flames | Kimball Union Academy (USHS-NH) |
| 192 | Scott Shaunessy (D) | United States | Quebec Nordiques | St. John's Prep (USHS-MA) |
| 193 | Reine Landgren (LW) | Sweden | Hartford Whalers (from the Rangers)^{2} | Sodertalje (Sweden) |
| 194 | Mark Ferner (D) | Canada | Buffalo Sabres | Kamloops Junior Oilers (WHL) |
| 195 | Yves Beaudoin (D) | Canada | Washington Capitals | Shawinigan Cataractes (QMJHL) |
| 196 | Milos Riha (LW) | Czechoslovakia | Minnesota North Stars | Vitkovice (Czechoslovakia) |
| 197 | Dave Shellington (LW) | Canada | New York Islanders | Cornwall Royals (OHL) |
| 198 | Thomas Rundqvist (LW) | Sweden | Montreal Canadiens | Karlstad (Sweden) |
| 199 | Dominik Hasek (G) | Czechoslovakia | Chicago Black Hawks | Pardubice (Czechoslovakia) |
| 200 | Warren Yadlowski (C) | Canada | Edmonton Oilers | Calgary Wranglers (WHL) |
| 201 | Bill McCormack (C) | United States | Philadelphia Flyers | Westminster School (USHS-CT) |
| 202 | Paul Fitzsimmons (D) | United States | Boston Bruins | Northeastern University (ECAC) |
^{Reference: "1983 NHL Entry Draft hockeydraftcentral.com". Archived from the original on February 19, 2009.}

1. The Hartford Whalers' tenth-round pick went to the Toronto Maple Leafs as the result of a trade on October 5, 1982 that sent Paul Marshall to Hartford in exchange for this pick.
2. The New York Rangers' tenth-round pick went to the Hartford Whalers as the result of a trade on February 2, 1982 that sent Rob McClanahan to the Rangers in exchange for this pick.

=== Round eleven ===
| # | Player | Nationality | NHL team | College/junior/club team |
|---|---|---|---|---|
| 203 | Garth Hildebrand (LW) | Canada | Pittsburgh Penguins | Calgary Wranglers (WHL) |
| 204 | Allan Acton (LW) | Canada | Hartford Whalers | Saskatoon Blazers (WHL) |
| 205 | Allan Stewart (LW) | Canada | New Jersey Devils | Prince Albert Raiders (WHL) |
| 206 | Jeff Frank (RW) | Canada / United States | Detroit Red Wings | Regina Pats (WHL) |
| 207 | Jan Blaha (RW) | Czechoslovakia | Los Angeles Kings | Ceske Budejovice (Czechoslovakia) |
| 208 | Mike Tomlak (C) | Canada | Toronto Maple Leafs | Cornwall Royals (OHL) |
| 209 | Eric Cormier (LW) | Canada | Winnipeg Jets | St. George's School (Canadian HS-QC) |
| 210 | Steve Kayser (D) | Canada | Vancouver Canucks | University of Vermont (ECAC) |
| 211 | Jaroslav Benak (D) | Czechoslovakia | Calgary Flames | Jihlava (Czechoslovakia) |
| 212 | Oldrich Valek (RW) | Czechoslovakia | Minnesota North Stars (from Quebec)^{1} | Jihlava (Czechoslovakia) |
| 213 | Bryan Walker (D) | Canada | New York Rangers | Portland Winter Hawks (WHL) |
| 214 | Uwe Krupp (D) | West Germany | Buffalo Sabres | Cologne (West Germany) |
| 215 | Alain Raymond (G) | Canada | Washington Capitals | Trois-Rivieres Draveurs (QMJHL) |
| 216 | Anders Huss (C) | Sweden | Washington Capitals (from Minnesota)^{2} | Gavle (Sweden) |
| 217 | John Bjorkman (C) | United States | New York Islanders | Warroad High School (USHS-MN) |
| 218 | Jeff Perpich (D) | United States | Montreal Canadiens | Hibbing High School (USHS-MN) |
| 219 | Steve Pepin (C) | Canada | Chicago Black Hawks | St. Jean Castors (QMJHL) |
| 220 | John Miner (D) | Canada | Edmonton Oilers | Regina Pats (WHL) |
| 221 | Brian Jopling (G) | United States | Philadelphia Flyers | Rensselaer Polytechnic Institute |
| 222 | Norm Foster (G) | Canada | Boston Bruins | Penticton Knights (BCJHL) |
^{Reference: "1983 NHL Entry Draft hockeydraftcentral.com". Archived from the original on February 19, 2009.}

1. The Quebec Nordiques' eleventh-round pick went to the Minnesota North Stars as the result of a trade on June 9, 1982 that sent Minnesota's 12th-rd pick in 1982 NHL entry draft to Quebec in exchange for this pick.
2. The Minnesota North Stars' eleventh-round pick went to the Washington Capitals as the result of a trade on August 4, 1982 that sent Rollie Boutin and Wes Jarvis to Minnesota in exchange for Robbie Moore and this pick.

=== Round twelve ===
| # | Player | Nationality | NHL team | College/junior/club team |
|---|---|---|---|---|
| 223 | Dave Goertz (D) | Canada | Pittsburgh Penguins | Regina Pats (WHL) |
| 224 | Darcy Kaminski (D) | Canada | Hartford Whalers | Lethbridge Broncos (WHL) |
| 225 | Alexei Kasatonov (D) | Soviet Union | New Jersey Devils | Moscow CSKA (USSR) |
| 226 | Chuck Chiatto (C) | United States | Detroit Red Wings | Cranbrook High School (USHS-MI) |
| 227 | Chad Johnson (C) | United States | Los Angeles Kings | Roseau High School (USHS-MN) |
| 228 | Ron Choules (LW) | Canada | Toronto Maple Leafs | Trois-Rivieres Draveurs (QMJHL) |
| 229 | Jamie Husgen (D) | United States | Winnipeg Jets | Des Moines Buccaneers (USHL) |
| 230 | Jay Mazur (RW) | Canada | Vancouver Canucks | Breck School (USHS-MN) |
| 231 | Sergei Makarov (RW) | Soviet Union | Calgary Flames | Moscow CSKA (USSR) |
| 232 | Bo Berglund (RW) | Sweden | Quebec Nordiques | Djurgardens IF (Sweden) |
| 233 | Ulf Nilsson (G) | Sweden | New York Rangers | Skelleftea (Sweden) |
| 234 | Marc Hamelin (G) | Canada | Buffalo Sabres | Shawinigan Cataractes (QMJHL) |
| 235 | Kermit Salfi (LW) | United States | Buffalo Sabres (from Washington)^{1} | Northwood School (USHS-NY) |
| 236 | Paul Roff (RW) | United States | Minnesota North Stars | Edina High School (USHS-MN) |
| 237 | Peter McGeough (D) | United States | New York Islanders | Bishop Hendricken High School (USHS-RI) |
| 238 | Jean-Guy Bergeron (D) | Canada | Montreal Canadiens | Shawinigan Cataractes (QMJHL) |
| 239 | Jindrich Kokrment (C) | Czechoslovakia | Quebec Nordiques (from Chicago)^{2} | Litvinov (Czechoslovakia) |
| 240 | Steven Woodburn (D) | Canada | Edmonton Oilers | Verdun Juniors (QMJHL) |
| 241 | Harold Duvall (LW) | United States | Philadelphia Flyers | Belmont Hill School (USHS-MA) |
| 242 | Greg Murphy (D) | United States | Boston Bruins | Trinity-Pawling High School (USHS-NY) |
^{Reference: "1983 NHL Entry Draft hockeydraftcentral.com". Archived from the original on February 19, 2009.}

1. The Washington Capitals' twelfth-round pick went to the Buffalo Sabres as the result of a trade on June 9, 1982 that sent Buffalo's 12th-rd pick in 1982 NHL entry draft to Washington in exchange for this pick.
2. The Chicago Black Hawks' twelfth-round pick went to the Quebec Nordiques as the result of a trade on June 8, 1983 that sent Quebec's 11th-rd pick in 1984 NHL entry draft to Chicago in exchange for this pick.

| = NHL All-Star team · | = NHL All-Star · | = NHL All-Star and NHL All-Star team · | = Hall of Famers |

== Draftees based on nationality ==
| Rank | Country | Amount |
|---|---|---|
| | North America | 208 |
| 1 | Canada | 150 |
| 2 | United States | 58 |
| | Europe | 34 |
| 3 | Sweden | 10 |
| 4 | Finland | 9 |
| 5 | Czechoslovakia | 9 |
| 6 | Soviet Union | 5 |
| 7 | West Germany | 1 |

== See also ==
- 1983–84 NHL season
- List of NHL players
